= List of films and television shows shot at Elstree Studios =

Films and television productions made at Elstree Studios

This is a list of films and TV productions made at Elstree Studios in Shenley Road, Borehamwood, England. Some dates represent production dates, rather than release dates.

== List ==
=== 1927 ===
Title	Type	Genre	Company	Director	Starring
Madame Pompadour	Silent film	Historical drama	BNP	Herbert Wilcox	Dorothy Gish, Antonio Moreno, Nelson Keys
Poppies of Flanders	Silent film	Drama	BIP	Arthur Maude	Jameson Thomas, Eve Gray, Malcolm Tod
The Ring	Silent film	Romance	BIP	Alfred Hitchcock	Carl Brisson, Lillian Hall-Davis, Ian Hunter
The Silver Lining	Silent film	Adventure	BIP	Thomas Bentley	Marie Ault, Patrick Aherne, Moore Marriott

=== 1928 ===
Title	Type	Genre	Company	Director	Starring
Adam's Apple	Silent film	Comedy	BIP	Tim Whelan	Monty Banks, Lena Halliday, Judy Kelly
Champagne	Silent film	Comedy	BIP	Alfred Hitchcock	Betty Balfour, Gordon Harker, Jean Bradin
Cocktails	Silent film	Comedy	BIP	Monty Banks	Harald Madsen, Enid Stamp-Taylor, Carl Schenstrøm
The Farmer's Wife	Silent film	Romantic comedy	BIP	Alfred Hitchcock	Jameson Thomas, Lillian Hall-Davis, Gordon Harker
The First Born	Silent film	Drama	Gainsborough	Miles Mander	Madeleine Carroll, Miles Mander, John Loder, Ella Atherton
God's Clay	Silent film	Drama	FNP	Graham Cutts	Anny Ondra, Trilby Clark, Franklyn Bellamy, Haddon Mason
A Knight in London	Silent film	Drama	Blattner Films	Lupu Pick	Lilian Harvey, Ivy Duke, Robin Irvine, Bernard Nedell
A Little Bit of Fluff	Silent film	Comedy	BIP	Wheeler Dryden	Syd Chaplin, Betty Balfour
Moulin Rouge	Silent film	Drama	BIP	Ewald André Dupont	Olga Chekhova, Eve Gray, Jean Bradin
Not Quite a Lady	Silent film	Comedy	BIP	Thomas Bentley	Mabel Poulton, Janet Alexander, Barbara Gott
Paradise	Silent film	Drama	BIP	Denison Clift	Betty Balfour, Joseph Striker, Alexander D'Arcy
Sir or Madam	Silent film	Comedy	Foremost Productions, Carl Boese-Film	Carl Boese	Margot Armand, Percy Marmont, Ossi Oswalda
Tesha	Silent film	Drama	BIP, Burlington Films	Victor Saville, Edwin Greenwood	María Corda, Jameson Thomas, Paul Cavanagh, Mickey Brantford
Tommy Atkins	Silent film	Drama	BIP	Norman Walker	Lillian Hall-Davis, Henry Victor, Walter Byron
Toni	Silent film	Thriller	BIP	Arthur Maude	Jack Buchanan, Dorothy Boyd, Forrester Harvey
Underground	Silent film	Drama	BIF	Anthony Asquith	Brian Aherne, Elissa Landi, Cyril McLaglen, Norah Baring
Weekend Wives	Film	Comedy	BIP	Harry Lachman	Monty Banks, Jameson Thomas, Estelle Brody
The White Sheik	Film	Adventure	BIP	Harley Knoles	Lillian Hall-Davis, Jameson Thomas, Warwick Ward
Widecombe Fair	Film	Comedy drama	BIP	Norman Walker	William Freshman, Marguerite Allan, Moore Marriott, Judd Green

=== 1929 ===
Title	Type	Genre	Company	Director	Starring
After the Verdict	Film	Drama	Tschechowa Film	Henrik Galeen	Olga Chekhova, Warwick Ward, Betty Carter, Malcolm Tod
Alpine Melodies	Short film	Musical	BIP	R.E. Jeffrey	Mary Frey-Bernharsgrutter, Ernst Frey-Bernharsgrutter
An Arabian Knight	Short film	Musical	BIP	R.E. Jeffrey	Paul England, Alma Vane
Atlantic	Film	Drama	BIP	Ewald André Dupont	Franklin Dyall, Madeleine Carroll
Atlantik	Film	Drama	BIP	Ewald André Dupont	Fritz Kortner, Elsa Wagner, Heinrich Schroth
Black and White	Short film	Musical	BIP	R.E. Jeffrey	Ellis Jackson, Jack Block (Jackson and Blake)
Blackmail	Film	Thriller drama	BIP	Alfred Hitchcock	Anny Ondra, John Longden, Cyril Ritchard
Chelsea Nights	Short film	Musical	BIP	R.E. Jeffrey	Carl Brisson, Mimi Crawford, Eugenie Prescott
Eileen of the Trees	Silent film	Drama	Pathé	Graham Cutts	Anny Ondra, William Freshman, Randle Ayrton, Gibb McLaughlin
Emerald of the East	Film	Adventure	BIP, British Pacific	Jean de Kuharski	Joshua Kean, Mary Odette, Lya Delvelez
The Feather	Film	Romantic drama	Strand	Leslie Hiscott	Jameson Thomas, Véra Flory, Randle Ayrton, Mary Clare
The Flying Scotsman	Part-talkie film	Drama	BIP	Castleton Knight	Moore Marriott, Pauline Johnson, Ray Milland, Alec Hurley
Hai-Tang	Part-talkie film	Drama	Richard Eichberg, Jean Kemm	BIP, Richard Eichberg-Film, Les Établissements Jacques Haïk	Anna May Wong, Marcel Vibert, Robert Ancelin
The Hate Ship	Film	Mystery		Norman Walker	Jameson Thomas, Jean Colin, Jack Raine
High Seas	Film	Adventure		Denison Clift	Lillian Rich, James Carew, John Stuart, Randle Ayrton, Winter Hall
The Inseparables	Silent film	Romance	Whitehall Films	Adelqui Migliar, John Stafford	Elissa Landi, Patrick Aherne, Annette Benson
The Informer	BIP	Part-talkie film	Drama	Arthur Robison	Lya De Putti, Lars Hanson, Warwick Ward, Carl Harbord
Jazztime	BIP	Short film	Musical	R.E. Jeffrey	Jack Payne, BBC Dance Orchestra
Kitty	Film	Drama	BIP, Burlington Films	Victor Saville	Estelle Brody, John Stuart
The Lady from the Sea	Film	Romance	BIP	Castleton Knight	Moore Marriott, Mona Goya, Ray Milland
Les deux mondes	Film	Drama	Les Films Marcel Vandal et Charles Delac	Ewald André Dupont	Max Maxudian, Henri Garat, Marie Glory
Lily of Killarney	Silent film	Drama	BIP	George Ridgwell	Cecil Landau, Barbara Gott, Dennis Wyndham
The Manxman	Silent film	Romance	BIP	Alfred Hitchcock	Carl Brisson, Malcolm Keen, Anny Ondra
Me and the Boys	Film	Musical	BIP	Victor Saville	Estelle Brody, Benny Goodman
Memories	Short film	Drama	BIP	R.E. Jeffrey	John Longden, Jack Raine, John Stuart, Jameson Thomas
Musical Medley	Short film	Musical	BIP	R.E. Jeffrey	Bobbie Anderson, Teddy Brown, Patricia Rossborough, The Charlot Girls
Musical Moments: An Interlude of Song and Dance	Short film	Musical	BIP	R.E. Jeffrey	Norman Hackforth, Eric Randolph, Harris Sisters, Alma Vane
Notes and Notions	Short film	Musical	BIP	R.E. Jeffrey	Gwen Farrar, Billy Mayerl
Odd Numbers	Short film	Musical	BIP	R.E. Jeffrey	Gwen Farrar, Billy Mayerl
An Old World Garden	Short film	Musical	BIP	R.E. Jeffrey	Paul England, Mimi Crawford
Piccadilly	Silent film	Drama	Wardour Films, Sono Art-World	Ewald André Dupont	Gilda Gray, Anna May Wong, Jameson Thomas
The Plaything	Film	Romance	BIP	Castleton Knight	Estelle Brody, Heather Thatcher, Nigel Barrie
Pot-Pourri	Short film	Musical	BIP	R.E. Jeffrey	Teddy Brown, Gladys Chalk, Margaret Donald
A Romance of Seville	Film	Drama	BIP	Norman Walker	Alexander D'Arcy, Marguerite Allan and Cecil Barry
Song-copation	Short film	Musical	BIP	R.E. Jeffrey	Bobbie Anderson, Patricia Rossborough
A Song or Two	Short film	Musical	BIP	R.E. Jeffrey	Norman Hackforth, Eric Randolph, Mavis Smith, Alma Vane
Splinters	Film	Musical	Gramophone, B&D	Jack Raymond	Sydney Howard, Nelson Keys, Carroll Gibbons
Those Who Love	Film	Drama	BIP	H. Manning Haynes	Adele Blanche, William Freshman, Carol Goodner
Under the Greenwood Tree	Film	Historical drama	BIP	Harry Lachman	Marguerite Allan, Nigel Barrie, John Batten
Up the Poll	Short film	Comedy	BIP	R.E. Jeffrey	Donald Calthrop
The Vagabond Queen	Film	Comedy	BIP	Géza von Bolváry	Betty Balfour, Glen Byam Shaw, Ernest Thesiger
The Woman He Scorned	Film	Drama	Charles Whittaker, Imperial Filmgesellschaft	Paul Czinner	Pola Negri, Warwick Ward, Hans Rehmann

=== 1930 ===
All Elstree Studios films in 1930 were produced by British International Pictures.

Title	Type	Genre	Director	Starring
Alf's Carpet	Film	Comedy	W. P. Kellino	Gerald Rawlinson, Gladys Hamer, Harald Madsen and Carl Schenstrøm
Almost a Honeymoon	Film	Comedy	Monty Banks	Clifford Mollison, Dodo Watts and Donald Calthrop
The American Prisoner	Film	Drama	Thomas Bentley	Carl Brisson, Madeleine Carroll, Cecil Barry
The Black Hand Gang	Film	Comedy	Monty Banks	Wee Georgie Wood, Viola Compton, Alfred Wood
Children of Chance	Film	Comedy crime	Alexander Esway	Elissa Landi, Mabel Poulton, John Stuart and John Longden
The Chinese Bungalow	Film	Drama	Arthur Barnes, J.B. Williams	Matheson Lang, Jill Esmond, Anna Neagle
Choral Cameos	Short film	Musical	R.E. Jeffrey	Glasgow Orpheus Choir
Claude Deputises	Short film	Comedy	R.E. Jeffrey	Billie Carlyle, Claude Dampier
Compromising Daphne	Film	Comedy	Thomas Bentley	Jean Colin, Phyllis Konstam, C. M. Hallard, Viola Compton
The Compulsory Husband	Film	Comedy	Monty Banks, Harry Lachman	Monty Banks, Lillian Manton, Clifford Heatherley, Gladys Frazin
The Copper	Film	Crime	Richard Eichberg	Hans Albers, Charlotte Susa, Margot Landa
An Elastic Affair	Short film	Comedy	Alfred Hitchcock	Cyril Butcher, Aileen Despard
Elstree Calling	Film	Musical	Adrian Brunel, Alfred Hitchcock	Tommy Handley, Helen Burnell, Donald Calthrop
A Feast of Harmony	Short film	Musical	R.E. Jeffrey	
The Flame of Love	Film	Drama	Richard Eichberg, Walter Summers	Anna May Wong, John Longden
French Leave	Film	Comedy	Jack Raymond	Madeleine Carroll, Sydney Howard, Arthur Chesney
Goodbye to All That	Short film	Musical	R.E. Jeffrey	Lois Obee, Victor Thornton
Harmony Heaven	Film	Musical	Thomas Bentley	Polly Ward, Stuart Hall, Trilby Clark
The Jolly Farmers	Short film	Musical	R.E. Jeffrey	Claude Fitzgerald, Edward Reach, Albert Wyndham
Juno and the Paycock	Film	Comedy	Alfred Hitchcock	Barry Fitzgerald, Maire O'Neill, Edward Chapman, Sara Allgood
Kiss Me Sergeant	Film	Comedy	Monty Banks	Leslie Fuller, Gladys Cruickshank, Gladys Frazin
Knowing Men	Film	Romantic comedy	Elinor Glyn	Carl Brisson, Elissa Landi, Helen Haye
Loose Ends	Film	Drama	Norman Walker	Edna Best, Owen Nares, Miles Mander
The Loves of Robert Burns	Film	Historical musical	Herbert Wilcox	Joseph Hislop, Dorothy Seacombe, Eve Gray
Menschen im Käfig	Film	Drama	Ewald André Dupont	Conrad Veidt, Fritz Kortner, Tala Birell
The Middle Watch	Film	Comedy	Norman Walker	Owen Nares, Jacqueline Logan, Jack Raine, Dodo Watts
Murder!	Film	Thriller	Alfred Hitchcock	Herbert Marshall, Norah Baring, Edward Chapman
Night Birds Richard Eichberg	Film	Thriller	Jack Raine, Muriel Angelus, Jameson Thomas	
The Nipper	Film	Musical	Louis Mercanton	Betty Balfour, John Stuart, Anne Grey
Not So Quiet on the Western Front	Comedy	Monty Banks	Leslie Fuller, Mona Goya, Wilfred Temple	
O.K. Chief	Comedy	Short film	Bernard Mainwaring	Walter Armitage, Frances Day
On Approval	Film	Comedy	Tom Walls	Tom Walls, Yvonne Arnaud, Winifred Shotter, Robertson Hare
The Price of Things	Film	Crime drama	Elinor Glyn	Elissa Landi, Stewart Rome
Raise the Roof	Film	Musical	Walter Summers	Betty Balfour, Maurice Evans, Jack Raine
Realities	Short film	Comedy	Bernard Mainwaring	Ian Harding, Laurence Ireland, Dodo Watts
Rookery Nook	Film	Farce	Tom Walls	Tom Walls, Ralph Lynn, Winifred Shotter, Mary Brough
The School for Scandal	Film	Historical comedy	Maurice Elvey	Basil Gill, Madeleine Carroll, Ian Fleming, Henry Hewitt
Song of Soho	Film	Musical	Harry Lachman	Carl Brisson, Edna Davies, Donald Calthrop
Suspense	Film	War	Walter Summers	Mickey Brantford, Cyril McLaglen, Jack Raine
Symphony in Two Flats	Film	Drama	Gareth Gundrey	Ivor Novello, Benita Hume, Jacqueline Logan
Tam O'Shanter	Short film	Drama	R.E. Jeffrey	
Tell Tales	Short film	Comedy	R.E. Jeffrey	Seymour Hicks
Tons of Money	Film	Comedy	Tom Walls	Ralph Lynn, Yvonne Arnaud, Mary Brough, Robertson Hare, Gordon James
Two Worlds	Film	War drama	Ewald André Dupont	Norah Baring, John Longden, Donald Calthrop
The W Plan	Film	Spy	Victor Saville	Brian Aherne, Madeleine Carroll, Gibb McLaughlin, Gordon Harker
A Warm Corner	Film	Comedy	Victor Saville	Leslie Henson, Heather Thatcher, Austin Melford
We Take Off Our Hats	Short film	Comedy	Harry Hughes	Donald Calthrop, Winifred Hall, Mark Lester, Frank Stanmore
Why Sailors Leave Home	Film	Comedy	Monty Banks	Leslie Fuller, Peter Bernard, Eve Gray
Wolves	Film	Crime	Albert de Courville	Charles Laughton, Dorothy Gish, Malcolm Keen
The Yellow Mask	Film	Musical crime	Harry Lachman	Lupino Lane, Dorothy Seacombe, Warwick Ward
Young Woodley	Film	Drama	Thomas Bentley	Madeleine Carroll, Frank Lawton, Sam Livesey, Gerald Rawlinson
Zwei Welten	Film	War drama	Ewald André Dupont	Helene Sieburg, Hermann Vallentin

=== 1931 ===
All Elstree Studios films in 1931 were produced by British International Pictures.

Title	Type	Genre	Director	Starring
Almost a Divorce	Film	Comedy	Jack Raymond, Arthur Varney	Nelson Keys, Sydney Howard, Margery Binner
Bill and Coo	Short film	Musical dramedy	J. O. C. Orton	Billy Merson, Herman Darewski, Hal Gordon
Canaries Sometimes Sing	Film	Romantic comedy	Tom Walls	Tom Walls, Cathleen Nesbitt, Athole Stewart, Yvonne Arnaud
Le cap perdu	Film	Drama	Ewald André Dupont	Harry Baur, Henri Bosc, Jean-Max
Cape Forlorn	Film	Drama	Ewald André Dupont	Fay Compton, Frank Harvey, Ian Hunter
Carnival	Film	Drama	Herbert Wilcox	Matheson Lang, Joseph Schildkraut, Kay Hammond, Chili Bouchier
The Chance of a Night Time	Film	Comedy	Herbert Wilcox	Ralph Lynn, Winifred Shotter, Kenneth Kove
Contraband Love	Film	Crime	Sidney Morgan	C. Aubrey Smith, Janice Adair, Haddon Mason
Creeping Shadows	Film	Crime	J. O. C. Orton	Franklin Dyall, Arthur Hardy, Margot Grahame
Cupboard Love	Short film	Comedy	Bernard Mainwaring	Maurice Evans, Marjorie Mars, Helena Pickard
Die Bräutigamswitwe	Film	Comedy	Richard Eichberg	Mártha Eggerth, Georg Alexander, Fritz Kampers
Doctor Josser K.C.	Film	Comedy	Norman Lee	Ernie Lotinga, Jack Hobbs, Molly Lamont
Dreyfus	Film		F.W. Kraemer, Milton Rosmer	Cedric Hardwicke, Abraham Sofaer, George Zucco, Arthur Hardy
Fascination	Film	Drama	Miles Mander	Madeleine Carroll, Carl Harbord, Dorothy Bartlam
The Flying Fool	Film	Comedy thriller	Walter Summers	Henry Kendall, Benita Hume, Wallace Geoffrey
The Girl in the Night	Film	Crime	Henry Edwards	Henry Edwards, Dorothy Boyd, Sam Livesey
Glamour	Film	Drama	Seymour Hicks, Harry Hughes	Seymour Hicks, Ellaline Terriss, Margot Grahame
Her Reputation	Film	Comedy	Sidney Morgan	Iris Hoey, Frank Cellier, Lillian Hall-Davis
Hobson's Choice	Film	Comedy drama	Thomas Bentley	James Harcourt, Viola Lyel, Frank Pettingell, Herbert Lomas
The House Opposite	Film	Crime	Walter Summers	Henry Kendall, Frank Stanmore, Celia Glyn
How He Lied to Her Husband	Short film	Comedy	Cecil Lewis	Edmund Gwenn, Vera Lennox, Robert Harris
Let's Love and Laugh	Film	Comedy	Richard Eichberg	Gene Gerrard, Muriel Angelus, Dennis Wyndham
The Love Habit	Film	Comedy	Harry Lachman	Seymour Hicks, Margot Grahame, Edmund Breon
The Love Race	Film	Comedy	Lupino Lane	Stanley Lupino, Jack Hobbs, Dorothy Boyd
The Man at Six	Film	Mystery	Harry Hughes	Anne Grey, Lester Matthews, Gerald Rawlinson
The Man from Chicago	Film	Crime	Walter Summers	Bernard Nedell, Dodo Watts, Joyce Kennedy, Austin Trevor
Many Waters	Film	Romance	Milton Rosmer	Lillian Hall-Davis, Arthur Margetson, Elizabeth Allan
Mischief	Film	Comedy	Jack Raymond	Ralph Lynn, Winifred Shotter, Jeanne Stuart
My Wife's Family	Film	Crime	Alexander Esway	Jacqueline Logan, Bernard Nedell, Gordon Harker
The Sport of Kings	Film	Comedy	Victor Saville	Leslie Henson, Hugh Wakefield, Gordon Harker
Old Soldiers Never Die	Film	Comedy	Monty Banks	Leslie Fuller, Molly Lamont, Alf Goddard
Out of the Blue	Film	Musical	Gene Gerrard	Gene Gerrard, Jessie Matthews, Kay Hammond
The Outsider	Film	Drama	Harry Lachman	Joan Barry, Harold Huth, Norman McKinnel
The Perfect Lady	Film	Comedy	Frederick J. Jackson	Moira Lynd, Henry Wilcoxon, Reginald Gardiner
Plunder	Film	Comedy	Tom Walls	Tom Walls, Ralph Lynn, Winifred Shotter, Robertson Hare
Poor Old Bill	Film	Comedy	Monty Banks	Leslie Fuller, Iris Ashley, Syd Courtenay
Potiphar's Wife	Film	Romance	Maurice Elvey	Nora Swinburne, Laurence Olivier, Guy Newall
Rich and Strange	Film	Romance	Alfred Hitchcock	Henry Kendall, Joan Barry, Percy Marmont, Betty Amann
The Shadow Between	Film	Romantic drama	Norman Walker	Godfrey Tearle, Kathleen O'Regan, Olga Lindo, Ann Casson
The Skin Game	Film	Drama	Alfred Hitchcock	Edmund Gwenn, Helen Haye, Jill Esmond, C. V. France
The Speckled Band	Film	Crime drama	Jack Raymond	Lyn Harding, Raymond Massey, Angela Baddeley, Nancy Price
Uneasy Virtue	Film	Comedy	Norman Walker	Fay Compton, Edmund Breon, Francis Lister, Donald Calthrop, Garry Marsh
Up for the Cup	Film	Comedy	Jack Raymond	Sydney Howard, Joan Wyndham, Stanley Kirk, Moore Marriott
What a Night!	Film	Comedy crime	Monty Banks	Leslie Fuller, Molly Lamont, Charles Paton
The Woman Between	Film	Drama	Miles Mander	Owen Nares, Adrianne Allen, David Hawthorne
The Written Law	Film	Drama	Reginald Fogwell	Madeleine Carroll, Percy Marmont, Henry Hewitt

=== 1932 ===
All Elstree Studios films in 1932 were produced by British International Pictures.

Title	Type	Genre	Director	Starring
After Office Hours	Film	Romantic drama	Thomas Bentley	Frank Lawton, Viola Lyel, Garry Marsh
Aren't We All?	Film	Comedy	Harry Lachman	Gertrude Lawrence, Hugh Wakefield, Owen Nares
Arms and the Man	Film	Romantic comedy	Cecil Lewis	Barry Jones, Anne Grey, Maurice Colbourne, Angela Baddeley
Bachelor's Baby	Film	Comedy	Harry Hughes	Ann Casson, William Freshman, Henry Wenman
Baroud	Film	Adventure	Rex Ingram, Alice Terry	Felipe Montes, Rosita Garcia, Pierre Batcheff
The Barton Mystery	Film	Crime	Henry Edwards	Ursula Jeans, Ellis Jeffreys, Lyn Harding
Betrayal	Film	Crime	Reginald Fogwell	Stewart Rome, Marjorie Hume, Leslie Perrins
Brother Alfred	Film	Comedy	Henry Edwards	Gene Gerrard, Molly Lamont, Elsie Randolph
Carmen	Film	Musical	Cecil Lewis	Marguerite Namara, Thomas F. Burke, Lance Fairfax
Come Into My Parlour	Film	Crime	John Longden	Renee Houston, Patrick Aherne, Robert Holmes
Diamond Cut Diamond	Film	Comedy crime	Maurice Elvey, Fred Niblo	Adolphe Menjoy, Claud Allister, Benita Hume
Down Our Street	Film		Harry Lachman	Hugh Williams, Nancy Price, Elizabeth Allan
Dual Control	Short Film		Walter Summers	Amy Johnson, Jim Mollison
Ebb Tide	Film	Drama	Arthur Rosson	Chili Bouchier, Joan Barry, George Barraud, Merle Oberon
Fires of Fate	Film	Adventure	Norman Walker	Lester Matthews, Kathleen O'Regan, Dorothy Bartlam
The Flag Lieutenant	Film	War	Henry Edwards	Henry Edwards, Anna Neagle, Joyce Bland, Peter Gawthorne
For the Love of Mike	Film	Musical comedy	Monty Banks	Bobby Howes, Constance Shotter, Arthur Riscoe
Goodnight, Vienna	Film	Musical	Herbert Wilcox	Jack Buchanan, Anna Neagle, Gina Malo
His Wife's Mother	Film	Comedy	Harry Hughes	Jerry Verno, Molly Lamont, Jack Hobbs
The Indiscretions of Eve	Film	Comedy	Cecil Lewis	Steffi Duna, Fred Conyngham, Lester Matthews
The Innocents of Chicago	Film	Comedy	Lupino Lane	Henry Kendall, Binnie Barnes, Margot Grahame
Josser in the Army	Film	War comedy	Norman Lee	Ernie Lotinga, Betty Norton, Jack Hobbs
Josser Joins the Navy	Film	Comedy	Norman Lee	Ernie Lotinga, Cyril McLaglen, Jack Hobbs
Josser on the River	Film	Comedy	Norman Lee	Ernie Lotinga, Molly Lamont, Charles Hickman
Keepers of Youth	Film	Drama	Thomas Bentley	Garry Marsh, Ann Todd, Robin Irvine
The Last Coupon	Film	Comedy	Frank Launder	Leslie Fuller, Mary Jerrold, Molly Lamont
Leap Year	Film	Comedy	Tom Walls	Tom Walls, Anne Grey, Edmund Breon, Ellis Jeffreys
Let Me Explain, Dear	Film	Comedy	Gene Gerrard, Frank Miller	Gene Gerrard, Viola Lyel, Claude Hulbert
Life Goes On	Film	Crime	Jack Raymond	Elsie Randolph, Betty Stockfeld, Warwick Ward
Lily Christine	Film	Drama	Paul L. Stein	Corinne Griffith, Colin Clive, Margaret Bannerman
Lord Camber's Ladies	Film	Drama	Benn W. Levy	Gerald du Maurier, Gertrude Lawrence, Benita Hume, Nigel Bruce
Love Lies	Film	Musical comedy	Lupino Lane	Stanley Lupino, Dorothy Boyd, Jack Hobbs
The Love Contract	Film	Musical	Herbert Selpin	Winifred Shotter, Owen Nares, Sunday Wilshin
Lucky Girl	Film	Musical comedy	Gene Gerrard, Frank Miller	Gene Gerrard, Molly Lamont, Gus McNaughton
A Lucky Sweep	Film	Comedy	A. V. Bramble	John Longden, Diana Beaumont
That Night in London	Film	Crime	Rowland V. Lee	Robert Donat, Pearl Argyle, Miles Mander, Roy Emerton
The Maid of the Mountains	Film	Musical	Lupino Lane	Nancy Brown, Harry Welchman
A Man of Mayfair	Film	Musical comedy	Louis Mercanton	Jack Buchanan, Joan Barry, Warwick Ward
The Mayor's Nest	Film	Comedy	Maclean Rogers	Sydney Howard, Claude Hulbert, Al Bowlly
Men Like These	Film	Drama	Walter Summers	John Batten, Sydney Seaward, Syd Crossley, James Enstone, Lesley Wareing
Mr. Bill the Conqueror	Film	Comedy	Norman Walker	Henry Kendall, Heather Angel, Nora Swineburn
Money for Nothing	Film	Comedy	Monty Banks	Seymour Hicks, Betty Stockfeld, Edmund Gwenn
Money Means Nothing	Film	Comedy	Herbert Wilcox	John Loder, Irene Richards, Miles Malleson
Money Talks	Film	Comedy	Norman Lee	Julian Rose, Jack Kid Berg, Judy Kelly
A Night Like This	Film	Comedy	Tom Walls	Tom Walls, Ralph Lynn, Winifred Shotter
Number Seventeen	Film	Comedy thriller	Alfred Hitchcock	John Stuart, Anne Grey, Leon M. Lion
Old Spanish Customers	Film	Comedy	Lupino Lane	Leslie Fuller, Binnie Barnes, Drusilla Wills
Say it with Music	Film	Musical	Jack Raymond	Jack Payne, Percy Marmont, Evelyn Roberts
Service for Ladies	Film	Comedy	Alexander Korda	Leslie Howard, George Grossmith Jr., Benita Hume, Elizabeth Allan
Sleepless Nights	Film	Musical comedy	Thomas Bentley	Stanley Lupino, Polly Walker, Gerald Rawlinson
Stamboul	Film	Drama	Dimitri Buchowetzki	Warwick Ward, Rosita Moreno, Margot Grahame, Garry Marsh
Strip! Strip! Hooray!!!	Short film	Comedy	Norman Lee	Ken Douglas, Betty Norton, Albert E. Raynor
Thark	Film	Farce	Tom Walls	Tom Walls, Ralph Lynn, Robertson Hare
These Charming People	Film	Drama	Louis Mercanton	Cyril Maude, Godfrey Tearle, Nora Swinburne
Tin Gods	Film	Drama	F.W. Kraemer	Frank Cellier, Dorothy Bartlam, Evan Thomas
Tonight's the Night	Film	Comedy	Monty Banks	Leslie Fuller, Amy Veness, Charles Farrell
Verdict of the Sea	Film	Adventure	Frank Miller, Sidney Northcote	John Stuart, Moira Lynd, Cyril McLaglen
Where Is This Lady?	Film	Musical	Victor Hanbury, Ladislao Vajda	Mártha Eggerth, Owen Nares, Wendy Barrie
Women Who Play	Film	Comedy	Arthur Rosson	Mary Newcomb, Benita Hume, George Barraud

=== 1933 ===
All Elstree Studios films in 1933 were produced by British International Pictures.

Title	Type	Genre	Director	Starring
Anne One Hundred	Film	Drama	Henry Edwards	Betty Stockfeld, Gyles Isham, Dennis Wyndham
Ask Beccles	Film	Comedy crime	Redd Davis	Garry Marsh, Lilian Oldland, Abraham Sofaer
The Blarney Stone	Film	Comedy	Tom Walls	Anne Grey, Robert Douglas, Zoe Palmer, Peter Gawthorne
Cash	Film	Comedy	Zoltan Korda	Edmund Gwenn, Wendy Barrie, Robert Donat
Counsel's Opinion	Film	Romantic comedy	Allan Dwan	Henry Kendall, Binnie Barnes
The Crime at Blossoms	Film	Crime	Maclean Rogers	Hugh Wakefield, Joyce Bland, Eileen Munro
Crime on the Hill	Film	Mystery	Bernard Vorhaus	Sally Blane, Nigel Playfair, Lewis Casson
Discord	Film	Drama	Henry Edwards	Owen Nares, Benita Hume, Harold Huth
Facing the Music	Film	Musical comedy	Harry Hughes	Stanley Lupino, José Collins, Nancy Burne
The Feather Bed: A Mrs. Feather Dilemma	Short film	Comedy	J. Bertram Fryer	Jeanne de Casalis, Gus McNaughton
For Love of You	Film	Musical comedy	Carmine Gallone	Arthur Riscoe, Naunton Wayne, Franco Foresta
General John Regan	Film	Comedy	Henry Edwards	Henry Edwards, Chrissie White, Ben Welden
Going Gay	Film	Musical	Carmine Gallone	Arthur Riscoe, Naunton Wayne, Magda Schneider
Happy	Film	Musical	Frederic Zelnik	Stanley Lupino, Dorothy Hyson, Laddie Cliff, Will Fyffe
Hawley's of High Street	Film	Comedy	Thomas Bentley	Leslie Fuller, Judy Kelly, Francis Lister, Moore Mariott
Heads We Go	Film	Comedy	Monty Banks	Constance Cummings, Frank Lawton, Binnie Barnes
I Was a Spy	Film	Thriller	Victor Saville	Madeleine Carroll, Herbert Marshall, Conrad Veidt
It's a King	Film	Comedy	Jack Raymond	Sydney Howard, Joan Maude, Cecil Humphreys
Just My Luck	Film	Comedy	Jack Raymond	Ralph Lynn, Winifred Shotter, Davy Burnaby, Robertson Hare
The King's Cup	Film	Comedy	Donald Macardle, Herbert Wilcox, Robert Cullen	Chili Bouchier, Harry Milton, William Kendall
Leave It to Me	Film	Comedy	Monty Banks	Gene Gerrard, Olive Borden, Molly Lamont
Letting in the Sunshine	Film	Comedy crime	Lupino Lane	Albert Burdon, Renee Gadd, Molly Lamont
The Little Damozel	Film	Romance	Herbert Wilcox	Anna Neagle, James Rennie, Benita Hume
Lord of the Manor	Film	Comedy	Henry Edwards	Betty Stockfeld, Frederick Kerr, Henry Wilcoxon
The Love Nest'	Film	Comedy	Thomas Bentley	Gene Gerrard, Camilla Horn, Nancy Burne
Maid Happy	Film	Musical	Mansfield Markham	Charlotte Ander, Johannes Riemann, Dennis Hoey
Men of Tomorrow	Film	Drama	Zoltan Korda, Leontine Sagan	Maurice Braddell, Joan Gardner, Emlyn Williams
Mixed Doubles	Film	Comedy	Sidney Morgan	Jeanne De Casalis, Frederick Lloyd, Cyril Raymond
Night of the Garter	Film	Comedy	Jack Raymond	Sydney Howard, Winifred Shotter, Elsie Randolph
No Funny Business	Film		Victor Hanbury, John Stafford	Laurence Olivier, Gertrude Lawrence, Jill Esmond
On Secret Service	Film	Thriller	Arthur B. Woods	Greta Nissen, Karl Ludwig Diehl, Don Alvarado, Austin Trevor
One Precious Year	Film	Drama	Henry Edwards	Anne Grey, Basil Rathbone, Owen Nares
The Pride of the Force	Film	Comedy	Norman Lee	Leslie Fuller, Patrick Aherne, Faith Bennett, Hal Gordon
The Private Life of Henry VIII	Film		Alexander Korda	Charles Laughton, Binnie Barnes, Robert Donat
Radio Parade	Film	Comedy	Richard Beville, Archie de Bear	Jeanne de Casalis, Florence Desmond
Red Wagon	Film	Drama	Paul L. Stein	Charles Bickford, Anthony Bushell, Greta Nissen
Send 'em Back Half Dead	Film	Comedy	Redd Davis	Nelson Keys, Polly Luce, Ben Welden
The Song You Gave Me	Film	Musical	Paul L. Stein	Bebe Daniels, Victor Varconi, Frederick Lloyd
A Southern Maid	Film	Musical	Harry Hughes	Bebe Daniels, Clifford Mollison, Hal Gordon
Strange Evidence	Film	Crime	Robert Milton	Leslie Banks, Carol Goodner, George Curzon
That's a Good Girl	Film	Comedy	Jack Buchanan	Jack Buchanan, Elsie Randolph, Dorothy Hyson
Their Night Out	Film	Comedy	Harry Hughes	Claude Hulbert, Renée Houston, Gus McNaughton
Trouble	Film	Comedy	Maclean Rogers	Sydney Howard, George Curzon, Dorothy Robinson
Purse Strings	Film		Henry Edwards	Chili Bouchier, Gyles Isham, Allan Jeayes
Summer Lightning	Film	Comedy	Maclean Rogers	Ralph Lynn, Winifred Shotter, Chili Bouchier
Timbuctoo	Film		Walter Summers, Arthur B. Woods	Henry Kendall, Margot Grahame
Up for the Derby	Film	Sports comedy	Maclean Rogers	Sydney Howard, Dorothy Bartlam, Tom Helmore
Up to the Neck	Film	Comedy	Jack Raymond	Ralph Lynn, Winifred Shotter, Francis Lister
Yes, Mr Brown	Film	Musical comedy	Herbert Wilcox	Jack Buchanan, Hartley Power, Elsie Randolph, Margot Grahame
You Made Me Love You	Film		Monty Banks	Stanley Lupino, Thelma Todd, John Loder

=== 1934 ===
All Elstree Studios films in 1934 were produced by British International Pictures.

Title	Type	Genre	Director	Starring
Badger's Green	Film		Adrian Brunel	Valerie Hobson, Bruce Lester, David Horne, Sebastian Smith
Blossom Time	Film	Musical drama	Paul L. Stein	Richard Tauber, Jane Baxter, Carl Esmond
Brides to Be	Film	Comedy	Reginald Denham	Betty Stockfeld, Constance Shotter, Ronald Ward
The Case for the Crown	Film	Crime	George A. Cooper	Miles Mander, Meriel Forbes, Whitmore Humphries
Dangerous Ground	Film	Mystery	Norman Walker	Malcolm Keen, Jack Raine, Joyce Kennedy
Doctor's Orders	Film	Comedy	Norman Lee	Leslie Fuller, John Mills, Marguerite Allan
Easy Money	Film	Comedy	Redd Davis	Lilian Oldland, Gerald Rawlinson, George Carney
Freedom of the Seas	Film	War comedy	Marcel Varnel	Clifford Mollison, Wendy Barrie, Zelma O'Neal
Get Your Man	Film	Comedy	George King	Dorothy Boyd, Sebastian Shaw, Clifford Heatherley
The Girl in the Flat	Film	Crime	Redd Davis	Stewart Rome, Belle Chrystall, Vera Bogetti, Noel Shannon
Girls, Please!	Film	Comedy	Jack Raymond	Sydney Howard, Jane Baxter, Meriel Forbes, Peter Gawthorne
Give Her a Ring	Film	Musical	Arthur B. Woods	Clifford Mollison, Wendy Barrie, Zelma O'Neal
Girls Will Be Boys	Film	Comedy	Marcel Varnel	Dolly Haas, Cyril Maude, Esmond Knight
I Spy	Film	Drama	Allan Dwan	Sally Eilers, Ben Lyon
It's a Cop	Film	Comedy	Maclean Rogers	Sydney Howard, Chili Bouchier, Garry Marsh
The King of Paris	Film	Drama	Jack Raymond	Cedric Hardwicke, Marie Glory, Ralph Richardson
The Lady Is Willing	Film	Comedy	Gilbert Miller	Leslie Howard
Lilies of the Field	Film	Romantic comedy	Norman Walker	Winifred Shotter, Ellis Jeffreys, Anthony Bushell, Claude Hulbert
Lost in the Legion	Film	Comedy	Fred Newmeyer	Leslie Fuller, Hal Gordon, Renée Houston
Love at Second Sight'	Film	Romantic comedy	Paul Merzbach	Marian Marsh, Anthony Bushell, Claude Hulbert
The Luck of a Sailor	Film	Romance	Robert Milton	Greta Nissen, David Manners, Clifford Mollison
Lucky Loser	Film	Comedy	Reginald Denham	Richard Dolman, Aileen Marson, Anna Lee
Master and Man	Film	Comedy	John Harlow	Wallace Lupino, Barry Lupino, Gus McNaughton
My Old Duchess	Film	Comedy	Lupino Lane	George Lacy, Betty Ann Davies, Dennis Hoey
My Song Goes Round the World	Film	Musical	Richard Oswald	Joseph Schmidt, John Loder, Charlotte Ander
Nell Gwynn	Film	Historical drama	Herbert Wilcox	Anna Neagle, Cedric Hardwicke, Jeanne de Casalis, Miles Malleson, Moore Marriott
The Old Curiosity Shop	Film	Drama	Thomas Bentley	Elaine Benson, Ben Webster, Hay Petrie
The Outcast	Film	Comedy crime	Norman Lee	Leslie Fuller, Mary Glynne, Hal Gordon
Over the Garden Wall	Film	Musical romantic comedy	John Daumery	Bobby Howes, Marian Marsh, Margaret Bannerman, Viola Lyel
A Political Party	Film		Norman Lee	Leslie Fuller, John Mills, Enid Stamp-Taylor, Viola Lyel
The Primrose Path	Film	Romance	Reginald Denham	Isobel Elsom, Whitmore Humphries, Max Adrian
The Private Life of Don Juan	Film	Dramedy	Alexander Korda	Douglas Fairbanks, Merle Oberon, Benita Hume
The Queen's Affair	Film	Musical	Herbert Wilcox	Anna Neagle, Fernand Gravey, Muriel Aked, Edward Chapman
Radio Parade of 1935	Film		Arthur B. Woods	Will Hay, Clifford Mollison, Helen Chandler
The Rise of Catherine the Great	Film	Historical	Paul Czinner	Elisabeth Bergner, Douglas Fairbanks Jr., Flora Robson
The Scarlet Pimpernel	Film	Adventure	Harold Young	Leslie Howard, Merle Oberon, Raymond Massey
The Scoop	Film	Crime	Maclean Rogers	Anne Grey, Tom Helmore, Wally Patch
The Scotland Yard Mystery	Film	Crime	Thomas Bentley	Gerald du Maurier, George Curzon, Grete Natzler, Belle Chrystall, Wally Patch
Seeing Is Believing	Film	Comedy crime	Redd Davis	William Hartnell, Gus McNaughton, Faith Bennett
Sorrell and Son	Film	Drama	Jack Raymond	H. B. Warner, Margot Grahame, Peter Penrose, Hugh Williams, Winifred Shotter
Spring in the Air	Film	Comedy	Victor Hanbury, Norman Lee	Edmund Gwenn, Zelma O'Neal, Theo Shall
Those Were the Days	Film	Comedy	Thomas Bentley	Will Hay, Iris Hoey, Angela Baddeley
The Warren Case	Film	Crime	Walter Summers	Richard Bird, Nancy Burne, Diana Napier
Wishes	Short film	Dramedy	W. P. Kellino	Wallace Lupino, Barry Lupino, Hal Gordon, Gus McNaughton

=== 1935 ===
All Elstree Studios films in 1935 were produced by British International Pictures.

Title	Genre	Director	Starring
Abdul the Damned	Drama	Karl Grune	Fritz Kortner, Nils Asther, John Stuart
Adventure Ltd.	Adventure	George King	Harry Milton, Pearl Argyle, Sebastian Shaw
Be Careful, Mr. Smith	Comedy	Max Mack	Bobbie Comber, Bertha Belmore, Cecil Ramage
Brewster's Millions	Musical comedy	Thornton Freeland	Jack Buchanan, Lili Damita
Checkmate	Crime	George Pearson	Maurice Evans, Felix Aylmer, Evelyn Foster
Come Out of the Pantry	Musical	Jack Raymond	Jack Buchanan, Fay Wray, James Carew, Fred Emney
Cross Currents	Comedy	Adrian Brunel	Ian Colin, Marjorie Hume, Evelyn Foster
Dandy Dick	Comedy	William Beaudine	Will Hay, Nancy Burne
Dance Band	Musical	Marcel Varnel	Charles "Buddy" Rogers, June Clyde, Steven Geray
Drake of England	Drama	Arthur B. Woods	Matheson Lang, Athene Seyler, Jane Baxter
Escape Me Never	Drama	Paul Czinner	Elisabeth Bergner, Hugh Sinclair, Griffith Jones
Flame in the Heather	Historical drama	Donovan Pedelty	Gwenllian Gill, Barry Clifton, Bruce Seton
Gentlemen's Agreement	Adventure	George Pearson	Frederick Peisley, Vivien Leigh
Heart's Desire	Musical drama	Paul L. Stein	Richard Tauber, Leonora Corbett, Kathleen Kelly, Diana Napier, Frank Vosper
Jubilee Window	Comedy	George Pearson	Sebastian Shaw, Ralph Truman, Olive Melville
Invitation to the Waltz	Historical musical	Paul Merzbach	Lilian Harvey, Wendy Toye, Carl Esmond
It's a Bet	Dramedy	Alexander Esway	Gene Gerrard, Helen Chandler, Judy Kelly
Key to Harmony	Drama	Norman Walker	Belle Chrystall, Fred Conyngham, Reginald Purdell, Olive Sloane
Lend Me Your Wife	Comedy	W. P. Kellino	Henry Kendall, Kathleen Kelly, Cyril Smith
I Give My Heart	Historical	Marcel Varnel	Gitta Alpar, Patrick Waddington, Owen Nares, Arthur Margetson
Lucky Days	Comedy	Reginald Denham	Chili Bouchier, Whitmore Humphries, Leslie Perrins
The Mad Hatters	Comedy	Ivar Campbell	Chili Bouchier, Sydney King, Evelyn Foster
McGlusky the Sea Rover	Comedy action	Walter Summers	Jack Doyle, Tamara Desni, Henry Mollison
Mimi	Romance	Paul L. Stein	Douglas Fairbanks Jr., Gertrude Lawrence, Diana Napier
Mister Cinders	Musical	Frederic Zelnik	Clifford Mollison, Zelma O'Neal
Music Hath Charms	Musical comedy	Thomas Bentley, Walter Summers, Arthur B. Woods, Alexander Esway	Henry Hall, Carol Goodner, Arthur Margetson, BBC Dance Orchestra
No Monkey Business	Comedy	Marcel Varnel	Gene Gerrard, June Clyde, Renée Houston, Richard Hearne
Once a Thief	Crime	George Pearson	John Stuart
Peg of Old Drury	Biopic	Herbert Wilcox	Anna Neagle, Cedric Hardwicke, Margaretta Scott
The Price of Wisdom	Drama	Reginald Denham	Mary Jerrold, Roger Livesey, Lilian Oldland
Royal Cavalcade	Drama	Thomas Bentley, Herbert Brenon, W. P. Kellino, Norman Lee, Walter Summers, Marcel Varnel	Marie Lohr, Hermione Baddeley, Owen Nares
Sanders of the River		Zoltán Korda	Leslie Banks, Paul Robeson
School for Stars	Romance	Donovan Pedelty	Fred Conyngham, Jean Gillie, Torin Thatcher
The Stoker	Comedy	Leslie Pearce	Leslie Fuller, Georgie Harris, Phyllis Clare
The Student's Romance	Musical	Otto Kanturek	Grete Natzler, Patric Knowles, Carol Goodner
Turn of the Tide	Drama	Norman Walker	John Garrick, Geraldine Fitzgerald, Wilfrid Lawson
Where's George?	Comedy	Jack Raymond	Sydney Howard, Mabel Constanduros, Frank Pettingell
While Parents Sleep	Comedy	Adrian Brunel	Jean Gillie, Enid Stamp Taylor, Romilly Lunge

=== 1936 ===
All Elstree Studios films in 1936 were produced by British International Pictures.

Title	Genre	Director	Starring
The Amateur Gentleman	Drama	Thornton Freeland	Douglas Fairbanks Jr., Elissa Landi, Gordon Harker, Margaret Lockwood
The Amazing Quest of Ernest Bliss	Romantic comedy	Alfred Zeisler	Cary Grant
As You Like It	Romantic comedy	Paul Czinner	Laurence Olivier, Elisabeth Bergner
Ball at Savoy	Operetta	Victor Hanbury	Conrad Nagel, Marta Labarr, Fred Conyngham, Aubrey Mather
The Belles of St. Clements	Drama	Ivar Campbell	Evelyn Foster, Meriel Forbes, Basil Langton
Captain Bill	Comedy	Ralph Ceder	Leslie Fuller, Judy Kelly, Hal Gordon
Chick	Comedy crime	Michael Hankinson	Sydney Howard, Betty Ann Davies, Fred Conyngham
Debt of Honour	Drama	Norman Walker	Leslie Banks, Will Fyffe, Geraldine Fitzgerald, Garry Marsh
Dusty Ermine	Crime	Bernard Vorhaus	Anthony Bushell, Jane Baxter, Ronald Squire
Everything Is Rhythm	Musical	Alfred J. Goulding	Harry Roy, Princess Pearl, Dorothy Boyd
Excuse My Glove	Sports comedy	Redd Davis	Len Harvey, Bobbie Comber
Fame	Comedy	Leslie S. Hiscott	Sydney Howard, Muriel Aked, Miki Hood
Gypsy Melody	Musical comedy	Edmond T. Gréville	Lupe Vélez, Alfred Rode, Jerry Verno, Raymond Lovell
House Broken	Comedy	Michael Hankinson	Louis Borel, Jack Lambert, Mary Lawson
I Live Again	Musical	Arthur Maude	Noah Beery, Bessie Love, John Garrick
The Improper Duchess		Harry Hughes	Yvonne Arnaud, Hugh Wakefield, Wilfrid Caithness
Limelight	Musical	Herbert Wilcox	Arthur Tracy, Anna Neagle, Jane Winton
Living Dangerously	Drama	Herbert Brenon	Otto Kruger, Leonora Corbett, Francis Lister
Love at Sea	Comedy	Adrian Brunel	Rosalyn Boulter, Carl Harbord, Aubrey Mallalieu
The Luck of the Irish		Donovan Pedelty	Richard Hayward, Kay Walsh
The Man Behind the Mask	Mystery	Michael Powell	Hugh Williams, Jane Baxter, Ronald Ward, Maurice Schwartz, George Merritt, Henry Oscar, Peter Gawthorne
The Man in the Mirror	Comedy	Maurice Elvey	Edward Everett Horton, Genevieve Tobin, Ursula Jeans
One Good Turn	Comedy	Alfred J. Goulding	Leslie Fuller, Georgie Harris, Hal Gordon
Pagliacci	Musical	Karl Grune	Richard Tauber, Steffi Duna, Diana Napier
Pay Box Adventure	Crime	W. P. Kellino	Syd Crossley, Marjorie Corbett, Roxie Russell
The Prisoner of Corbal	Historical drama	Karl Grune	Nils Asther, Hugh Sinclair, Hazel Terry
Ourselves Alone	Drama	Brian Desmond Hurst	John Lodge, John Loder, Antoinette Cellier
Radio Lover		Paul Capon, Austin Melford	Wylie Watson, Ann Penn, Betty Ann Davies
Royal Eagle		George A. Cooper	John Garrick, Nancy Burne, Felix Aylmer, Edmund Willard
The Secret Voice	Thriller	George Pearson	John Stuart, Diana Beaumont, John Kevan
Sensation	Crime	Brian Desmond Hurst	John Lodge, Diana Churchill, Francis Lister, Felix Aylmer
She Knew What She Wanted	Musical comedy	Thomas Bentley	Albert Burdon, Claude Dampier, Googie Withers
Someone at the Door		Herbert Brenon	Aileen Marson, Billy Milton, Noah Beery, John Irwin, Edward Chapman
Spy of Napoleon	Historical	Maurice Elvey	Richard Barthelmess, Dolly Haas, Frank Vosper, Henry Oscar, James Carew
A Star Fell from Heaven	Comedy	Paul Merzbach	Joseph Schmidt, Florine McKinney, Billy Milton
Strange Cargo	Crime	Lawrence Huntington	Kathleen Kelly, George Mozart, Moore Marriott
The Tenth Man	Drama	Brian Desmond Hurst	John Lodge, Antoinette Cellier, Athole Stewart
Things to Come	Sci-fi	William Cameron Menzies	Raymond Massey, Edward Chapman, Ralph Richardson, Margaretta Scott, Cedric Hardwicke, Maurice Braddell, Derrick De Marney, Ann Todd
This'll Make You Whistle	Musical comedy	Herbert Wilcox	Jack Buchanan, Elsie Randolph, William Kendall
Three Maxims	Drama	Herbert Wilcox	Anna Neagle, Tullio Carminati, Leslie Banks
Ticket of Leave	Crime	Michael Hankinson	Dorothy Boyd, John Clements, George Merritt
Tomorrow We Live	Drama	H. Manning Haynes	Godfrey Tearle, Haidee Wright, Renee Gadd
Two on a Doorstep	Comedy	Lawrence Huntington	Kay Hammond, Harold French, Anthony Hankey
Two's Company	Comedy	Tim Whelan	Ned Sparks, Gordon Harker, Mary Brian
Wednesday's Luck	Crime	George Pearson	Wilson Coleman, Susan Bligh, Patrick Barr, Moore Marriott
When Knights Were Bold	Musical comedy	Jack Raymond	Jack Buchanan, Fay Wray, Garry Marsh
A Woman Alone	Drama	Eugene Frenke	Anna Sten Henry Wilcoxon, Viola Keats, John Garrick

=== 1937 ===
Title	Genre	Company	Director	Starring
Aren't Men Beasts!	Comedy	BIP	Graham Cutts	Robertson Hare, Alfred Drayton, Billy Milton
Boys Will Be Girls	Comedy		Gilbert Pratt	Leslie Fuller, Nellie Wallace, Greta Gynt
Bulldog Drummond at Bay	Mystery	ABPC	Norman Lee	John Lodge, Dorothy Mackaill, Claud Allister
Clothes and the Woman	Romance		Albert de Courville	Rod La Rocque, Tucker McGuire, Constance Collier
Conquest		MGM	Clarence Brown	Greta Garbo, Charles Boyer, Reginald Owen, Alan Marshal
Cotton Queen	Comedy	Rock Studios	Bernard Vorhaus	Stanley Holloway, Will Fyffe, Mary Lawson, Helen Haye
Darby and Joan	Drama	Rock Studios	Syd Courtenay	Peggy Simpson, Ian Fleming, Tod Slaughter, Mickey Brantford
The Dominant Sex	Comedy	ABPC	Herbert Brenon	Phillips Holmes, Diana Churchill, Romney Brent
The Edge of the World	Drama	Joe Rock Productions	Michael Powell	John Laurie, Belle Chrystall, Eric Berry, Finlay Currie, Niall MacGinnis
Glamorous Night	Drama	ABPC	Brian Desmond Hurst	Mary Ellis, Otto Kruger, Victor Jory
Let's Make a Night of It	Musical comedy	ABPC	Graham Cutts	Charles "Buddy" Rogers, June Clyde, Claire Luce
London Melody	Musical	ABPC	Herbert Wilcox	Anna Neagle, Tullio Carminati, Robert Douglas
Millions	Comedy	ABPC	Leslie Hiscott	Gordon Harker, Richard Hearne, Frank Pettingell
The Minstrel Boy	Musical	ABPC	Sidney Morgan	Fred Conyngham, Chili Bouchier, Lucille Lisle
Over She Goes	Musical comedy	ABPC	Graham Cutts	Stanley Lupino, Claire Luce, Laddie Cliff, Gina Malo, Max Baer
Please Teacher	Comedy		Stafford Dickens	Bobby Howes, Vera Pearce, Rene Ray
The Reverse Be My Lot	Drama		Raymond Stross	Ian Fleming, Marjorie Corbett, Mickey Brantford
Rhythm Racketeer	Musical		James Seymour	Harry Roy, Princess Pearl, James Carew
Sing as You Swing	Musical		Redd Davis	Charles Clapham, Bill Dwyer, Claude Dampier
Spring Handicap			Herbert Brenon	Will Fyffe, Maire O'Neill, Billy Milton

=== 1938 ===
Title	Genre	Company	Director	Starring
Black Limelight	Crime	ABPC	Paul L. Stein	Joan Marion, Raymond Massey
Hold My Hand	Musical comedy	ABPC	Thornton Freeland	Stanley Lupino, Fred Emney, Barbara Blair
Housemaster	Dramedy	ABPC	Herbert Brenon	Otto Kruger, Diana Churchill, Phillips Holmes
Jane Steps Out	Comedy	ABPC	Paul L. Stein	Diana Churchill, Jean Muir, Peter Murray-Hill, Athene Seyler
Luck of the Navy	Comedy thriller	ABPC	Norman Lee	Geoffrey Toone, Judy Kelly, Clifford Evans
Marigold	Drama	ABPC	Thomas Bentley	Sophie Stewart, Patrick Barr, Phyllis Dare, Edward Chapman, Pamela Stanley
Oh Boy	Comedy	ABPC	Albert de Courville	Albert Burdon, Mary Lawson, Bernard Nedell
Premiere	Musical mystery	ABPC	Walter Summers	John Lodge, Judy Kelly, Joan Marion, Hugh Williams
Queer Cargo	Drama	ABPC	Harold D. Schuster	John Lodge, Judy Kelly, Kenneth Kent
Runaway Ladies	Romantic comedy		Jean de Limur	Betty Stockfeld, Roger Tréville, Claude Dauphin
The Singing Cop	Musical comedy		Arthur B. Woods	Keith Falkner, Chili Bouchier
A Sister to Assist 'Er	Comedy		George Dewhurst, Widgey R. Newman	Muriel George, Polly Emery, Charles Paton
Sidewalks of London	Dramedy	Mayflower Pictures	Tim Whelan	Vivien Leigh, Rex Harrison, Tyrone Guthrie
Stardust	Musical romantic comedy	William Rowland Productions	Melville W. Brown	Lupe Vélez, Ben Lyon, Wallace Ford, Jean Colin
Star of the Circus	Drama		Albert de Courville	Otto Kruger, Gertrude Michael, John Clements
The Terror	Crime	ABPC	Richard Bird	Wilfrid Lawson, Bernard Lee, Arthur Wontner, Linden Travers
Vessel of Wrath	Drama	Mayflower	Erich Pommer	Charles Laughton, Elsa Lanchester
Yellow Sands	Dramedy	ABPC	Herbert Brenon	Marie Tempest, Belle Chrystall, Wilfrid Lawson, Robert Newton
Yes, Madam?	Musical comedy	ABPC	Norman Lee	Bobby Howes, Diana Churchill, Wiley Watson

=== 1939 ===
Title	Genre	Company	Director	Starring
Black Eyes	Drama	ABPC	Herbert Brenon	Otto Kruger, Mary Maguire, Walter Rilla
The Gang's All Here	Comedy mystery	ABPC	Thornton Freeland	Jack Buchanan
Hell's Cargo	Adventure	ABPC	Harold Huth	Walter Rilla, Kim Peacock, Robert Newton
Jamaica Inn	Adventure thriller	Mayflower Pictures	Alfred Hitchcock	Charles Laughton, Maureen O'Hara, Leslie Banks, Robert Newton
Just Like a Woman	Comedy	ABPC	Paul L. Stein	Felix Aylmer, Jeanne de Casalis, Fred Emney
Lucky to Me	Musical comedy	ABPC	Thomas Bentley	Stanley Lupino, Phyllis Brooks, Barbara Blair
Murder in Soho	Crime	ABPC	Norman Lee	Jack La Rue, Sandra Storme, Googie Withers, Bernard Lee
The Outsider	Drama	ABPC	Paul L. Stein	George Sanders, Mary Maguire, Barbara Blair
Poison Pen	Drama	ABPC	Paul L. Stein	Flora Robson, Reginald Tate, Ann Todd
The Saint in London	Crime	ABPC	John Paddy Carstairs	George Sanders, Sally Gray
Secret Journey	Thriller		John Baxter	Basil Radford, Silvia St. Claire, Thorley Walters
She Couldn't Say No	Comedy		Graham Cutts	Tommy Trinder, Fred Emney, Googie Withers
Sons of the Sea	Drama		Maurice Elvey	Leslie Banks, Kay Walsh, Mackenzie Ward, Cecil Parker
Trunk Crime	Thriller		Roy Boulting	Manning Whiley, Barbara Everest, Michael Drake
What Would You Do, Chums?	Comedy		John Baxter	Syd Walker, Jean Gillie, Cyril Chamberlain

=== 1940 ===
Title	Genre	Company	Director	Starring
At the Villa Rose	Detective	ABPC	Walter Summers	Kenneth Kent, Judy Kelly
Crimes at the Dark House		ABPC	George King	Tod Slaughter, Sylvia Marriott, Hilary Eaves
Dead Man's Shoes	Drama	ABPC	Thomas Bentley	Leslie Banks, Joan Marion, Wilfrid Lawson
The Flying Squad	Crime	ABPC	Herbert Brenon	Sebastian Shaw, Phyllis Brooks, Jack Hawkins
The House of the Arrow	Mystery	RKO	Harold French	Kenneth Kent, Diana Churchill, Belle Chrystall, Peter Murray-Hill
Just William	Comedy	ABPC	Graham Cutts	Richard Lupino, Fred Emney, Basil Radford
Meet Maxwell Archer		ABPC	John Paddy Carstairs	John Loder, Leueen MacGrath, Athole Stewart
Old Mother Riley Joins Up	Comedy	British National	Maclean Rogers	Arthur Lucan, Kitty McShane, Martita Hunt

=== 1942 ===
Title	Type	Genre	Company	Director	Starring
White Cargo		MGM	Richard Thorpe	Hedy Lamarr, Walter Pidgeon	

=== 1945 ===
Title	Type	Genre	Company	Director	Starring
The Man from Morocco	Film	Action adventure	ABPC	Mutz Greenbaum	Anton Walbrook, Margaretta Scott, Mary Morris

=== 1946—1948 ===
Elstree was closed during this time, as the Royal Army Ordnance Corps used it as a depot during World War II.

=== 1949 ===
==== Film ====
Title	Genre	Company	Director	Starring
Conspirator	Film noir, suspense, espionage, thriller	MGM	Victor Saville	Robert Taylor, Elizabeth Taylor
Edward, My Son	Drama	MGM-British	George Cukor	Spencer Tracy, Deborah Kerr, Ian Hunter
The Hasty Heart	War drama	ABPC	Vincent Sherman	Ronald Reagan, Patricia Neal, Richard Todd
Landfall	War	ABPC	Ken Annakin	Michael Denison, Patricia Plunkett, Kathleen Harrison
Man on the Run	Film noir	ABPC	Lawrence Huntington	Derek Farr, Joan Hopkins, Edward Chapman, Kenneth More, Laurence Harvey

==== Television ====
Title	Genre	Company	Series	Episodes	Years	Main director/s	Starring
The New Adventures of Martin Kane	Crime drama	UA	1	39		Fred Burns	William Gargan, Lloyd Nolan, Lee Tracy, Mark Stevens, Walter Kinsella

=== 1950 ===
Title	Type	Genre	Company	Director	Starring
The Dancing Years	Film	Musical	ABPC	Harold French	Dennis Price, Gisèle Préville, Patricia Dainton
Guilt Is My Shadow	Film	Drama	ABPC	Roy Kellino	Elizabeth Sellars, Patrick Holt, Peter Reynolds
Portrait of Clare	Film	Drama	ABPC	Lance Comfort	Margaret Johnston, Richard Todd, Robin Bailey, Ronald Howard
Stage Fright	Film	Black comedy film noir	Transatlantic	Alfred Hitchcock	Jane Wyman, Marlene Dietrich, Michael Wilding, Richard Todd
The Woman with No Name	Film	Drama	Independent	Ladislao Vajda	Phyllis Calvert, Edward Underdown, Helen Cherry, Richard Burton

=== 1951 ===
==== Film ====
Title	Genre	Company	Director	Starring
Captain Horatio Hornblower	Naval swashbuckling war	Warner Bros.	Raoul Walsh	Gregory Peck, Virginia Mayo, Robert Beatty, Terence Morgan
The Franchise Affair	Thriller	ABPC	Lawrence Huntington	Michael Denison, Anthony Nicholls, Marjorie Fielding
Green Grow the Rushes	Comedy	Act Films Ltd	Derek N. Twist	Roger Livesey, Richard Burton, Honor Blackman
Happy Go Lovely	Musical comedy	Excelsior Films Ltd.	H. Bruce Humberstone	David Niven, Vera-Ellen, Cesar Romero
Laughter in Paradise	Comedy	ABPC	Mario Zampi	Alastair Sim, Fay Compton, George Cole, Guy Middleton
The Magic Box	Biographical drama	Festival Film Productions	John Boulting	Robert Donat, Margaret Johnston, Maria Schell, Robert Beatty, Margaret Rutherford
Young Wives' Tale	Comedy	ABPC	Henry Cass	Joan Greenwood, Nigel Patrick, Derek Farr, Guy Middleton

==== Television ====
Title	Genre	Company	Series	Episodes	Years	Main director/s	Starring
Schlitz Playhouse of Stars	Anthology	Meridian Productions, Revue	8	347	1951—1959	Roy Kellino	James Mason, Irene Dunne

=== 1952 ===
Title	Genre	Company	Director	Starring
24 Hours of a Woman's Life	Romantic drama	ABPC, Allied Artists	Victor Saville	Merle Oberon, Richard Todd
Angels One Five	War	Templar Productions	George More O'Ferrall	Jack Hawkins, Michael Denison, Dulcie Gray, John Gregson
Castle in the Air	Comedy	ABPC	Henry Cass	David Tomlinson, Helen Cherry, Margaret Rutherford
Elstree Story	Documentary	ABPC	Gilbert Gunn	Richard Todd, Monty Banks, Jack Buchanan
Father's Doing Fine	Comedy	Marble Arch	Henry Cass	Richard Attenborough, Heather Thatcher, Noel Purcell, Virginia McKenna
So Little Time	Romance drama	Mayflower Productions	Compton Bennett	Marius Goring, Maria Schell, Lucie Mannheim
Top Secret	Comedy	ABPC	Mario Zampi	George Cole, Oskar Homolka, Nadia Gray
Where's Charley?	Musical comedy	Warner Bros.	David Butler	Ray Bolger, Allyn Ann McLerie
The Woman's Angle	Drama	ABPC	Leslie Arliss	Edward Underdown, Cathy O'Donnell, Lois Maxwell, Claude Farell

=== 1953 ===
Title	Genre	Company	Director	Starring
The Good Beginning	Drama	ABPC	Gilbert Gunn	John Fraser, Eileen Moore, Peter Reynolds
The House of the Arrow	Mystery	ABPC	Michael Anderson	Oskar Homolka, Yvonne Furneaux, Robert Urquhart
Isn't Life Wonderful!	Comedy	ABPC	Harold French	Cecil Parker, Eileen Herlie, Donald Wolfit, Peter Asher
The Master of Ballantrae	Adventure	Warner Bros.	William Keighley	Errol Flynn, Roger Livesey
Rob Roy: The Highland Rogue	Adventure	Walt Disney	Harold French	Richard Todd, Glynis Johns, James Robertson Justice, Michael Gough, Finlay Currie, Geoffrey Keen
South of Algiers	Travel adventure	Mayflower Productions	Jack Lee	Van Heflin, Wanda Hendrix, Eric Portman
Valley of Song	Dramedy	ABPC	Gilbert Gunn	Mervyn Johns, Clifford Evans, Rachel Thomas
Will Any Gentleman...?	Comedy	ABPC	Michael Anderson	George Cole, Veronica Hurst, William Hartnell
The Yellow Balloon	Drama	ABPC, Allied Artists	J. Lee Thompson	Andrew Ray, Kenneth More, Kathleen Ryan, William Sylvester

=== 1954 ===
Title	Genre	Company	Director	Starring
Duel in the Jungle	Adventure	ABPC, Todon	George Marshall	Dana Andrews, Jeanne Crain, David Farrar
For Better, For Worse	Comedy	Kenwood Productions	J. Lee Thompson	Dirk Bogarde, Susan Stephen, Cecil Parker, Eileen Herlie, Athene Seyler
Happy Ever After	Comedy	ABPC	Mario Zampi	David Niven, Yvonne De Carlo, Barry Fitzgerald
Knave of Hearts	Dramedy, romance	Transcontinental Films	René Clément	Valerie Hobson, Gérard Philipe, Joan Greenwood, Margaret Johnston, Natasha Parry
Lilacs in the Spring	Musical	Everest Pictures	Herbert Wilcox	Errol Flynn, Anna Neagle, David Farrar, Kathleen Harrison
Trouble in the Glen	Comedy	Everest Pictures	Herbert Wilcox	Margaret Lockwood, Orson Welles, Forrest Tucker, Victor McLaglen
The Weak and the Wicked	Drama	Marble Arch	J. Lee Thompson	Glynis Johns, Diana Dors

=== 1955 ===
==== Film ====
Title	Genre	Company	Director	Starring
The Dam Busters	Epic war	ABPC	Michael Anderson	Richard Todd, Michael Redgrave
The Dark Avenger	Historical adventure	Allied Artists, 20th Century Fox	Henry Levin	Errol Flynn, Joanne Dru, Peter Finch, Yvonne Furneaux
The Eric Winstone Bandshow	Music	Hammer	Michael Carreras	Kenny Baker, Alma Cogan, Eric Winstone
King's Rhapsody	Musical	Everest Pictures	Herbert Wilcox	Errol Flynn, Anna Neagle, Patrice Wymore
Oh... Rosalinda!!	Musical comedy	ABPC, The Archers	Michael Powell, Emeric Pressburger	Michael Redgrave, Mel Ferrer, Anthony Quayle, Ludmilla Tchérina, Anton Walbrook

==== Television ====
Title	Genre	Company	Series	Episodes	Years	Main director/s	Starring
Dial 999	Crime	Towers of London Productions, Ziv	1	39	1958—1959	Bernard Knowles	Robert Beatty
ITV Television Playhouse	Anthology		9	387	1955—1967	Cyril Coke	Campbell Singer, Thomas Heathcote
Ivanhoe	Adventure	Screen Gems, Sydney Box Productions	1	39	1958—1959	Arthur Crabtree, Bernard Knowles	Roger Moore, Robert Brown
Sailor of Fortune	Adventure	Elstree Film Productions	2	26	1955—1958	John Guillermin, Michael McCarthy	Lorne Greene
Target	Horror anthology	Ziv	1	41	1958	Eddie Davis	Adolphe Menjou

=== 1956 ===
==== Film ====
Title	Genre	Company	Director	Starring
1984	Sci-fi	Holiday Film Productions Ltd.	Michael Anderson	Edmond O'Brien, Donald Pleasence, Jan Sterling, Michael Redgrave
Anastasia	Alternate history drama		Anatole Litvak	Ingrid Bergman, Yul Brynner, Helen Hayes
Beyond Mombasa	Adventure	Todon Productions, Hemisphere	George Marshall	Cornel Wilde, Donna Reed, Leo Genn
It's Great to Be Young	Musical comedy	Marble Arch	Cyril Frankel	John Mills, Cecil Parker
It's Never Too Late	Comedy	Park Lane Films	Michael McCarthy	Phyllis Calvert, Patrick Barr, Susan Stephen, Guy Rolfe
Moby Dick	Adventure	Moulin Productions	John Huston	Gregory Peck, Richard Basehart, Leo Genn, Orson Welles
My Wife's Family	Comedy	Forth Films	Gilbert Gunn	Ronald Shiner, Ted Ray, Greta Gynt, Robertson Hare
Now and Forever	Drama	Anglofilm	Mario Zampi	Janette Scott, Vernon Gray, Kay Walsh
The Silken Affair	Romantic comedy	Dragon Films	Roy Kellino	David Niven, Geneviève Page, Wilfrid Hyde-White, Joan Sims, Irene Handl, Ronald Squire
Tons of Trouble	Comedy	Shaftesbury Films	Leslie S. Hiscott	Richard Hearne, William Hartnell, Austin Trevor
Yield to the Night	Crime drama	ABPC	J. Lee Thompson	Diana Dors
You Can't Escape	Drama	Forth Films	Wilfred Eades	Noelle Middleton, Guy Rolfe, Robert Urquhart, Peter Reynolds

==== Television ====
Title	Genre	Company	Series	Episodes	Years	Main director/s	Starring
Armchair Theatre	Anthology	ABC, Thames	14	452	1956—1974	Philip Saville	Harry H. Corbett, Billie Whitelaw, Neil McCallum, Paul Whitsun-Jones
ITV Play of the Week	Anthology	Granada	13	610	1955—1974	Lionel Harris, Cyril Coke, John Llewellyn Moxey	Derek Francis, Alfred Burke, Arthur Hewlett, Esther Lawrence

=== 1957 ===
==== Film ====
Title	Genre	Company	Director	Starring
The Good Companions	Musical	ABPC	J. Lee Thompson	Eric Portman, Celia Johnson, Janette Scott, Joyce Grenfell
Interpol	Film noir crime	Warwick Films	John Gilling	Victor Mature. Anita Ekberg, Trevor Howard
Let's Be Happy	Musical	Marcel Hellman	Henry Levin	Vera-Ellen, Tony Martin, Robert Flemyng
Night of the Demon	Horror	Sabre Films	Jacques Tourneur	Dana Andrews, Peggy Cummins, Niall MacGinnis
No Time for Tears	Drama	ABPC	Cyril Frankel	Anna Neagle, George Baker, Sylvia Syms, Anthony Quayle
Sea Wife	Drama thriller	Alma Productions	Bob McNaught	Joan Collins, Richard Burton, Basil Sydney, Cy Grant
Small Hotel	Comedy	Welwyn Films Ltd	David MacDonald	Gordon Harker, Marie Lohr, Janet Munro
Tarzan and the Lost Safari	Action adventure	Sol Lesser, Solar Films	Bruce Humberstone	Gordon Scott, Robert Beatty, Yolande Donlan, Betta St. John
These Dangerous Years	Drama musical	Everest Pictures	Herbert Wilcox	George Baker, Frankie Vaughan, Carole Lesley, Thora Hird, Kenneth Cope, David Lodge, John Le Mesurier
The Traitor	Film noir drama	Fantur Films	Michael McCarthy	Donald Wolfit, Robert Bray, Jane Griffiths, Anton Diffring
Woman in a Dressing Gown	Drama	Godwin-Willis Productions	J. Lee Thompson	Yvonne Mitchell, Anthony Quayle, Sylvia Syms, Carole Lesley
Yangtse Incident: The Story of H.M.S. Amethyst	War	Wilcox-Neagle	Michael Anderson	Richard Todd, William Hartnell, Akim Tamiroff

==== Television ====
Title	Genre	Company	Series	Episodes	Years	Main director/s	Starring
Overseas Press Club - Exclusive!	Adventure anthology	Ardleigh Films, ABPC	1	13	1957	A. Edward Sutherland, David MacDonald	

=== 1958 ===
==== Film ====
Title	Genre	Company	Director	Starring
Chase a Crooked Shadow	Suspense	Associated Dragon Films, ABPC	Michael Anderson	Richard Todd, Anne Baxter, Herbert Lom
Girls at Sea	Comedy	ABPC	Gilbert Gunn	Guy Rolfe, Alan White, Anne Kimbell, Michael Hordern, Ronald Shiner
High Hell	Adventure	Princess Production Corporation	Burt Balaban	John Derek, Elaine Stewart, Patrick Allen, Al Mulock
Ice Cold in Alex	War	ABPC	J. Lee Thompson	John Mills, Sylvia Syms, Anthony Quayle, Harry Andrews
Indiscreet	Romantic comedy	Warner Bros.	Stanley Donen	Cary Grant, Ingrid Bergman
Intent to Kill	Film noir thriller	Zonic Productions	Jack Cardiff	Richard Todd, Betsy Drake, Herbert Lom
The Key	War	Open Road Films Ltd., Highwood Productions Inc.	Carol Reed	William Holden, Sophia Loren, Trevor Howard
The Lady Is a Square	Comedy musical	Wilcox Productions, Embassy, MGM	Herbert Wilcox	Anna Neagle, Frankie Vaughan, Janette Scott
A Lady Mislaid	Comedy	Welwyn Films Ltd	David MacDonald	Phyllis Calvert, Alan White, Thorley Walters
Law and Disorder	Crime comedy	Paul Soskin Productions, British Lion Films Ltd	Charles Crichton	Michael Redgrave, Robert Morley
The Moonraker	Swashbuckler	ABPC	David MacDonald	George Baker, Sylvia Syms, Marius Goring
The Naked Earth	Drama	Foray Films, Four Square	Vincent Sherman	Richard Todd, Juliette Gréco, John Kitzmiller, Finlay Currie, Laurence Naismith, Christopher Rhodes
She Didn't Say No!	Comedy	GW Films	Cyril Frankel	Eileen Herlie, Perlita Neilson, Niall MacGinnis
The Silent Enemy	Action	Romulus	William Fairchild	Laurence Harvey, Dawn Addams, John Clements, Michael Craig, Sid James
Trader Horn			Ronald Kinnoch	
The Two-Headed Spy	Spy thriller	Columbia Pictures, Sabre Films	Andre de Toth	Jack Hawkins, Gia Scala, Erik Schumann, Alexander Knox
Wonderful Things!	Comedy romance	Everest Pictures	Herbert Wilcox	Frankie Vaughan, Jeremy Spenser
The Young and the Guilty	Drama	Warwick Studios	Peter Cotes	Phyllis Calvert, Andrew Ray, Edward Chapman

==== Television ====
Title	Genre	Company	Series	Episodes	Years	Main director/s	Starring
The Veil	Horror/thriller anthology	Hal Roach Studios	1	12	1958	Herbert L. Strock, George Waggner	Boris Karloff

=== 1959 ===
==== Film ====
Title	Genre	Company	Director	Starring
Alive and Kicking	Comedy	Diador	Cyril Frankel	Sybil Thorndike, Kathleen Harrison, Estelle Winwood, Stanley Holloway
The Devil's Disciple	Historical comedy	Hecht-Hill-Lancaster, Brynapod	Guy Hamilton	Burt Lancaster, Kirk Douglas, Laurence Olivier
Follow That Horse!	Comedy	ABPC, Cavalcade Films	Alan Bromly	David Tomlinson, Cecil Parker, Richard Wattis, Dora Bryan, Mary Peach
Look Back in Anger	Drama	Orion, Woodfall Films, ABPC	Tony Richardson	Richard Burton, Claire Bloom, Mary Ure, Edith Evans
The Mummy	Horror	Hammer	Terence Fisher	Peter Cushing, Christopher Lee, Yvonne Furneaux
Naked Fury	Crime thriller]	Coenda Films	Charles Saunders	Reed De Rouen, Kenneth Cope, Leigh Madison
No Trees in the Street	Crime thriller	ABPC	J. Lee Thompson	Sylvia Syms, Herbert Lom, Stanley Holloway
Operation Bullshine	Comedy	ABPC	Gilbert Gunn	Donald Sinden, Barbara Murray, Carole Lesley
The Siege of Pinchgut	Thriller	ABPC	Harry Watt	Aldo Ray, Heather Sears
Tommy the Toreador	Musical comedy	Fanfare	John Paddy Carstairs	Tommy Steele, Janet Munro, Sid James, Bernard Cribbins

==== Television ====
Title	Genre	Company	Series	Episodes	Years	Main director/s	Starring
The Flying Doctor	Drama	ABPC, Gross-Krasne Productions	1	39	1959	David MacDonald	Richard Denning, Jill Adams, Alan White, Peter Madden
Fredric March Presents Tales from Dickens	Drama	Towers of London	1	14	1959—1961	Robert Lynn, Ross MacKenzie	Fredric March

=== 1960 ===
Title	Genre	Company	Director	Starring
Bottoms Up	Comedy	Transocean	Mario Zampi	Jimmy Edwards, Arthur Howard, Martita Hunt, Sydney Tafler, Mitch Mitchell
The Full Treatment	Thriller	Hammer	Val Guest	Claude Dauphin, Diane Cilento, Ronald Lewis
Hell Is a City	Crime thriller	Hammer	Val Guest	Stanley Baker, John Crawford
An Honourable Murder	Drama		Godfrey Grayson	Norman Wooland, Margaretta Scott, Lisa Daniely
Moment of Danger	Crime drama	Cavalcade Films	László Benedek	Trevor Howard, Dorothy Dandridge, Edmund Purdom
Sands of the Desert	Adventure comedy	ABPC	John Paddy Carstairs	Charlie Drake, Peter Arne, Sarah Branch, Raymond Huntley
School for Scoundrels	Comedy	ABPC, Guardsman Films	Robert Hamer	Ian Carmichael, Terry-Thomas, Janette Scott, Alastair Sim
The Skiers of Norway	Documentary	Columbia	Egil S. Woxholt	Tomm Hurstad, Nils Langard, Eli Tone Langsholt
The Sundowners	Comedy drama	Warner Bros.	Fred Zinnemann	Deborah Kerr, Robert Mitchum, Peter Ustinov
The Trials of Oscar Wilde	Historical drama	Warwick Films	Ken Hughes	Peter Finch, Yvonne Mitchell, James Mason, Nigel Patrick, Lionel Jeffries, John Fraser
The Two Faces of Dr. Jekyll	Horror	Hammer	Terence Fisher	Paul Massie, Dawn Addams, Christopher Lee, David Kossoff

=== 1961 ===
==== Film ====
Title	Genre	Company	Director	Starring
The Devil's Hands	Drama		Alonzo Deen Cole	Douglas Ives, Andrew Keir, Moira Lister
Don't Bother to Knock	Comedy	ABPC	Cyril Frankel	Richard Todd, Nicole Maurey, Elke Sommer, June Thorburn, Rik Battaglia, Judith Anderson
The Guns of Navarone	Epic adventure war	Highroad Productions	J. Lee Thompson	Gregory Peck, David Niven, Anthony Quinn
Hand in Hand	Drama	ABPC, Helen Winston Productions	Philip Leacock	Loretta Parry, Philip Needs
His and Hers	Comedy	Sabre Films	Brian Desmond Hurst	Terry-Thomas, Janette Scott, Wilfrid Hyde-White, Nicole Maurey
The Long and the Short and the Tall	War	ABPC	Leslie Norman	Richard Todd, Laurence Harvey, Richard Harris
The Naked Edge	Thriller	Baroda, Bentley Productions, Jason Films	Michael Anderson	Gary Cooper, Deborah Kerr
Petticoat Pirates	Comedy	ABPC	David MacDonald	Charlie Drake, Anne Heywood, Cecil Parker, John Turner
The Rebel	Comedy	ABPC	Robert Day	Tony Hancock, George Sanders, Paul Massie, Margit Saad
The Roman Spring of Mrs. Stone	Romance drama	Warner Bros., Seven Acts	José Quintero	Vivien Leigh, Warren Beatty, Lotte Lenya, Jill St. John, Coral Browne
A Story of David	Drama	Scoto, Mardeb, ABC	Bob McNaught	Jeff Chandler, Basil Sydney, Peter Arne
Taste of Fear	Thriller	Hammer	Seth Holt	Susan Strasberg, Ronald Lewis, Ann Todd, Christopher Lee, John Serret
The Young Ones	Musical	ABPC	Sidney J. Furie	Cliff Richard, Robert Morley, Carole Gray, The Shadows

==== Television ====
Title	Genre	Company	Series	Episodes	Years	Main director/s	Starring
Alcoa Premiere	Anthology	Avasta Productions	2	57	1961—1963	Alan Crosland Jr.	Fred Astaire
The Avengers	Action	ABC, ABPC	7	161	1961—1969	Don Leaver, Peter Hammond	Patrick Macnee
Sir Francis Drake	Adventure	ITC	1	26	1961—1962	David Greene, Terry Bishop, Clive Donner	Terence Morgan, Jean Kent

=== 1962 ===
==== Film ====
Title	Genre	Company	Director	Starring
Billy Budd	Historical drama-adventure	Anglo Allied, Harvest Films, Nikhanj Films	Peter Ustinov	Terence Stamp, Robert Ryan, Peter Ustinov, Melvyn Douglas
The Boys	Courtroom drama	Atlas, Galaworldfilm Productions	Sidney J. Furie	Richard Todd, Robert Morley, Felix Aylmer
Dr. Crippen	Biography	Torchlight Productions	Robert Lynn	Donald Pleasence, Coral Browne, Samantha Eggar
Go to Blazes	Comedy	ABPC	Michael Truman	Dave King, Robert Morley, Daniel Massey, Dennis Price
Guns of Darkness	Drama	ABPC, Cavalcade Films	Anthony Asquith	David Niven, Leslie Caron, James Robertson Justice, David Opatoshu
Jigsaw	Crime drama	Figaro	Val Guest	Jack Warner, Ronald Lewis, Yolande Donlan, Michael Goodliffe, John Le Mesurier
Lolita	Psychological dramedy	Seven Arts, AA Productions, Anya Pictures, Transworld Pictures	Stanley Kubrick	Shelley Winters, Peter Sellers, Sue Lyon
Mrs. Gibbons' Boys	Comedy	Byron	Max Varnel	Kathleen Harrison, Lionel Jeffires, Diana Dors
Night of the Eagle	Horror	Independent Artists	Sidney Hayers	Peter Wyngarde, Janet Blair, Margaret Johnston, Anthony Nicholls, Colin Gordon
Operation Snatch	Comedy	Keep Films, Lion International	Robert Day	Terry-Thomas, George Sanders, Lionel Jeffries, Jocelyn Lane
The Pot Carriers	Comedy drama	ABPC	Peter Graham Scott	Ronald Fraser, Paul Massie, Carole Lesley
We Joined the Navy	Comedy	Dial, ABPC	Wendy Toye	Kenneth More, Lloyd Nolan, Joan O'Brien, Derek Fowlds, Graham Crowden, Esma Cannon, and John Le Mesurier

==== Television ====
Title	Genre	Company	Series	Episodes	Years	Main director/s	Starring
The Saint	Mystery spy thriller	Bamore, ITC, New World Productions	6	118	1961—1969	Leslie Norman	Roger Moore, Ivor Dean

=== 1963 ===
==== Films ====
Title	Genre	Company	Director	Starring
The Cracksman	Comedy	ABPC	Peter Graham Scott	Charlie Drake, Nyree Dawn Porter, George Sanders, Dennis Price
Espionage	Anthology	ATV, ITC, NBC	David Greene	
The Punch and Judy Man	Comedy	ABPC	Jeremy Summers	Tony Hancock, Sylvia Syms, Ronald Fraser, Barbara Murray
The Scarlet Blade	Adventure	ABPC, Hammer	John Gilling	Lionel Jeffries, Oliver Reed, Jack Hedley, June Thorburn
The Servant	Drama	Springbok Productions	Joseph Losey	Dirk Bogarde, Sarah Miles, James Fox, Wendy Craig
Sparrows Can't Sing	Kitchen sink	Carthage Films	Joan Littlewood	James Booth, Barbara Windsor, Roy Kinnear, Avis Bunnage, Brian Murphy, Yootha Joyce
Summer Holiday	Musical	ABPC	Peter Yates	Cliff Richard, Lauri Peters, David Kossoff, Ron Moody, The Shadows
Tamahine	Comedy	ABPC, Seven Arts	Philip Leacock	Nancy Kwan, Dennis Price, John Fraser
West 11	Crime	ABPC, Dial	Michael Winner	Alfred Lynch, Kathleen Breck, Eric Portman, Diana Dors, Kathleen Harrison
What a Crazy World	Musical	Michael Carreras Productions	Michael Carreras	Joe Brown, Susan Maughan
The World Ten Times Over	Drama	ABPC, Cyclops	Wolf Rilla	Sylvia Syms, Edward Judd, June Ritchie, William Hartnell

==== Television ====
Title	Genre	Company	Series	Episodes	Years	Main director/s	Starring
The Human Jungle	Drama	Independent Artists	2	26	1963—1965	Roy Ward Baker	Herbert Lom, Michael Johnson, Sally Smith, Mary Yeomans

=== 1964 ===
==== Film ====
Title	Genre	Company	Director	Starring
The Bargee	Comedy	ABPC, Galton-Simpson	Duncan Wood	Harry H. Corbett, Hugh Griffith, Eric Sykes, Ronnie Barker
Boy with a Flute	Drama	Grand National Pictures	Montgomery Tully	Jeremy Hawk, Freda Jackson, Dorothy Winters
Crooks in Cloisters	Comedy	ABPC	Jeremy Summers	Ronald Fraser, Barbara Windsor, Grégoire Aslan, Bernard Cribbins, Melvyn Hayes, Wilfrid Brambell
The Curse of the Mummy's Tomb	Horror	Hammer, Swallow Productions	Michael Carreras	Terence Morgan, Fred Clark, Ronald Howard, Jeanne Roland
French Dressing	Comedy	Kenwood Productions	Ken Russell	James Booth, Roy Kinnear, Marisa Mell
The Gorgon	Horror	Hammer	Terence Fisher	Christopher Lee, Peter Cushing, Richard Pasco
Man in the Middle	War	Talbot Productions	Guy Hamilton	Robert Mitchum, France Nuyen, Barry Sullivan
The Masque of the Red Death	Horror	Alta Vista Productions	Roger Corman	Vincent Price, Hazel Court, Jane Asher
Nothing But the Best	Comedy	Domino Productions	Clive Donner	Alan Bates, Denholm Elliott
Rattle of a Simple Man	Dramedy	Sydney Box Productions	Muriel Box	Diane Cilento, Harry H. Corbett, Michael Medwin, Thora Hird
The Third Secret	Psychological mystery thriller	Hubris Productions	Charles Crichton	Stephen Boyd, Jack Hawkins, Richard Attenborough, Diane Cilento, Pamela Franklin, Paul Rogers, Alan Webb
Wonderful Life	Musical	Ivy Productions	Sidney J. Furie	Cliff Richard, Walter Slezak, Susan Hampshire

==== Television ====
Title	Genre	Company	Series	Episodes	Years	Main director/s	Starring
Gideon's Way	Crime	ITC, New World Productions	1	26	1964—1966	Leslie Norman, Cyril Frankel	John Gregson, Alexander Davion, Daphne Anderson

=== 1965 ===
==== Film ====
Title	Genre	Company	Director	Starring
The Battle of the Villa Fiorita	Drama	Warner Bros.	Delmer Daves	Maureen O'Hara, Rossano Brazzi
The Brigand of Kandahar	Adventure	ABPC, Hammer	John Gilling	Ronald Lewis, Oliver Reed, Duncan Lamont
Fanatic	Horror thriller	Hammer	Silvio Narizzano	Tallulah Bankhead, Stefanie Powers, Donald Sutherland
The Nanny	Suspense	ABPC, Hammer, Seven Arts	Seth Holt	Bette Davis, William Dix, Wendy Craig, Jill Bennett
She	Adventure	Hammer	Robert Day	Ursula Andress, Peter Cushing, Bernard Cribbins, John Richardson, Rosenda Monteros, Christopher Lee

=== 1966 ===
==== Film ====
Title	Genre	Company	Director	Starring
One Million Years B.C.	Adventure	Hammer	Don Chaffey	Raquel Welch, John Richardson, Percy Herbert, Robert Brown, Martine Beswick
Stop the World, I Want to Get Off	Musical	Warner Bros.	Philip Saville	Tony Tanner, Millicent Martin, Leila Croft, Valerie Croft

==== Television ====
Title	Genre	Company	Series	Episodes	Years	Main director/s	Starring
The Baron	Crime	ITC	1	30	1966—1967	John Llewellyn Moxey	Steve Forrest, Sue Lloyd

=== 1967 ===
Title	Genre	Company	Director	Starring
The Double Man	Spy	Albion Films	Franklin J. Schaffner	Yul Brynner, Britt Ekland, Clive Revill, Anton Diffring
The Fearless Vampire Killers	Comedy horror	Cadre Films, Filmways	Roman Polanski	Jack MacGowran, Roman Polanski, Sharon Tate, Alfie Bass, Ferdy Mayne
Mister Ten Per Cent	Comedy	ABPC	Peter Graham Scott	Charlie Drake, Derek Nimmo, Wanda Ventham, John Le Mesurier
Slave Girls	Fantasy adventure	Hammer, Seven Arts	Michael Carreras	Martine Beswick, Michael Latimer, Carol White, Steven Berkoff
Theatre of Death	Horror	Pennea Productions Ltd.	Samuel Gallu	Christopher Lee, Julian Glover, Lelia Goldoni

=== 1968 ===
==== Film ====
Title	Genre	Company	Director	Starring
The Anniversary	Black comedy	Hammer, Seven Arts	Roy Ward Baker	Bette Davis, Sheila Hancock
The Lost Continent	Adventure	Hammer, Seven Arts	Michael Carreras	Eric Porter, Hildegard Knef, Suzanna Leigh, Tony Beckley, James Cossins
The Devil Rides Out	Horror	Hammer, Seven Arts	Terence Fisher	Christopher Lee, Charles Gray, Niké Arrighi, Leon Greene
Hammerhead	Eurospy thriller	Irving Allen Productions	David Miller	Vince Edwards, Judy Geeson, Peter Vaughan
Secret Ceremony	Thriller	World Film Services	Joseph Losey	Elizabeth Taylor, Mia Farrow, Robert Mitchum
The Vengeance of She	Fantasy	Hammer, Seven Arts	Cliff Owen	John Richardson, Olinka Berova, Edward Judd, André Morell, Colin Blakely

==== Television ====
Title	Genre	Company	Series	Episodes	Years	Main director/s	Starring
The Champions	Espionage thriller sci-fi	ITC	1	30	1968—1969	Cyril Frankel	Stuart Damon, Alexandra Bastedo, William Gaunt, Anthony Nicholls

=== 1969 ===
==== Film ====
Title	Genre	Company	Director	Starring
Crossplot	Neo noir crime	Bamore, Tribune Productions Inc.	Alvin Rakoff	Roger Moore, Claudie Lange, Alexis Kanner
Frankenstein Must Be Destroyed	Horror	Hammer	Terence Fisher	Peter Cushing, Freddie Jones, Veronica Carlson, Simon Ward
Lock Up Your Daughters	Comedy	Domino Films	Peter Coe	Christopher Plummer, Susannah York, Glynis Johns
Moon Zero Two	Sci-fi	Hammer	Roy Ward Baker	James Olson, Catherine Schell, Warren Mitchell, Adrienne Corri

==== Television ====
Title	Genre	Company	Series	Episodes	Years	Main director/s	Starring
Department S	Spy-fi adventure	ITC	1	28	1969—1970	Cyril Frankel	Peter Wyngarde, Joel Fabiani, Rosemary Nicols, Dennis Alaba Peters
Randall and Hopkirk (Deceased)	Crime	Scoton, ITC	1	26	1969—1970	Jeremy Summers, Ray Austin, Cyril Frankel	Mike Pratt, Kenneth Cope, Annette Andre

=== 1970 ===
==== Film ====
Title	Genre	Company	Director	Starring
The Adventurers	Adventure drama	Embassy	Lewis Gilbert	Bekim Fehmiu, Candice Bergen, Charles Aznavour, Olivia de Havilland, Fernando Rey, Ernest Borgnine, Alan Badel, Leigh Taylor-Young
And Soon the Darkness	Thriller	ABPC, EMI-Elstree	Robert Fuest	Pamela Franklin, Michele Dotrice, Sandor Elès
The Breaking of Bumbo	Comedy	EMI, Timon Films	Andrew Sinclair	Richard Warwick, Joanna Lumley
Crescendo	Horror psychological thriller	Hammer	Alan Gibson	Stefanie Powers, James Olson, Margaretta Scott, Jane Lapotaire, Joss Ackland
Hoffman	Comedy	ABPC, Longstone Films	Alvin Rakoff	Peter Sellers, Sinéad Cusack, Ruth Dunning, Jeremy Bulloch
The Horror of Frankenstein	Horror	Hammer	Jimmy Sangster	Ralph Bates, Kate O'Mara, Veronica Carlson, David Prowse
The Man Who Haunted Himself	Psychological thriller	EMI, ABPC	Basil Dearden	Roger Moore, Hildegarde Neil
Mister Jerico	Comedy	ITC	Sidney Hayers	Patrick Macnee, Connie Stevens, Herbert Lom, Marty Allen
The Railway Children	Drama	EMI-Elstree	Lionel Jeffries	Dinah Sheridan, Jenny Agutter, Sally Thomsett, Bernard Cribbins
Scars of Dracula	Horror	Hammer	Roy Ward Baker	Christopher Lee, Dennis Waterman, Jenny Hanley, Patrick Troughton, Michael Gwynn
Some Will, Some Won't	Comedy	ABPC, Transocean	Duncan Wood	Michael Hordern, Ronnie Corbett, Dennis Price, Leslie Phillips, Arthur Lowe
Taste the Blood of Dracula	Horror	Hammer	Peter Sasdy	Christopher Lee, Linda Hayden, Geoffrey Keen, Gwen Watford
The Vampire Lovers	Gothic horror	Hammer	Roy Ward Baker	Ingrid Pitt, George Cole, Kate O'Mara, Peter Cushing, Dawn Addams

==== Television ====
Title	Genre	Company	Series	Episodes	Years	Main director/s	Starring
Here Come the Double Deckers	Comedy	20th Century Fox, David Gerber Productions	1	17	1970—1971	Harry Booth	Michael Audreson, Gillian Bailey, Peter Firth, Brinsley Forde, Douglas Simmonds, Bruce Clark, Debbie Russ

=== 1971 ===
==== Film ====
Title	Genre	Company	Director	Starring
The Abominable Dr. Phibes	Dark comedy horror	Amicus	Robert Fuest	Vincent Price, Joseph Cotten, Peter Jeffrey, Virginia North
Blood from the Mummy's Tomb	Horror	Hammer	Seth Holt	Valerie Leon, Andrew Keir, Mark Edwards, James Villiers, Hugh Burden, Aubrey Morris
The Boy Friend	Musical comedy	Russfix	Ken Russell	Twiggy, Christopher Gable, Tommy Tune, Max Adrian
Dr. Jekyll and Sister Hyde	Horror	Hammer	Roy Ward Baker	Ralph Bates, Martine Beswick
Dulcima	Drama	EMI	Frank Nesbitt	Carol White, John Mills
Get Carter	Crime	MGM-British Studios	Mike Hodges	Michael Caine, Ian Hendry, John Osborne, Britt Ekland
The Go-Between	Romance	EMI	Joseph Losey	Julie Christie, Alan Bates, Margaret Leighton, Michael Redgrave, Dominic Guard
Lust for a Vampire	Horror	Hammer	Jimmy Sangster	Ralph Bates, Barbara Jefford, Suzanna Leigh, Michael Johnson, Yutte Stensgaard
Mr. Forbush and the Penguins	Adventure	EMI, PGL Productions	Alfred Viola, Arne Sucksdorff, Roy Boulting	John Hurt, Hayley Mills
On the Buses	Comedy	Hammer, EMI-Elstree	Harry Booth	Reg Varney, Doris Hare
Percy	Comedy	Welbeck Films	Ralph Thomas	Hywel Bennett, Denholm Elliott, Elke Sommer, Britt Ekland, Cyd Hayman
The Raging Moon	Romantic drama	EMI-Elstree	Bryan Forbes	Malcolm MacDowell, Nanette Newman, Georgia Brown, Barry Jackson
The Tales of Beatrix Potter	Ballet	GW Films, EMI-Elstree	Reginald Mills	Frederick Ashton, Alexander Grant, Michael Coleman, Wayne Sleep, Lesley Collier
Up Pompeii	Sex comedy	Anglo-EMI, ALF	Bob Kellett	Frankie Howerd, Michael Hordern
Up the Chastity Belt	Comedy	EMI, Anglo-EMI	Bob Kellett	Terry Glinwood, Ned Sherrin
Villain	Gangster	Anglo-EMI	Michael Tuchner	Richard Burton, Ian McShane, Nigel Davenport, Donald Sinden, Fiona Lewis

=== 1972 ===
==== Film ====
Title	Genre	Company	Director	Starring
The Alf Garnett Saga	Comedy	ALF	Bob Kellett	Warren Mitchell, Dandy Nichols, Adrienne Posta
Demons of the Mind	Horror	Anglo-EMI, Frank Godwin Productions, Hammer	Peter Sykes	Gillian Hills, Robert Hardy, Patrick Magee, Michael Hordern, Shane Briant
Dr. Phibes Rises Again	Horror-dark comedy	AIP	Robert Fuest	Vincent Price, Robert Quarry
Dracula A.D. 1972	Horror	Hammer	Alan Gibson	Christopher Lee, Peter Cushing, Stephanie Beacham, Christopher Neame, Michael Coles
Endless Night	Horror-mystery	British Lion Films Ltd, EMI, National Film Trustee Company	Sidney Gilliat	Hayley Mills, Hywel Bennett, Britt Ekland, Per Oscarsson, George Sanders
Fear in the Night	Psychological horror	Hammer	Jimmy Sangster	Judy Geeson, Joan Collins, Peter Cushing, Ralph Bates
For the Love of Ada	Comedy	Tigon	Ronnie Baxter	Irene Handl, Wilfred Pickles, Barbara Mitchell, Jack Smethurst
Henry VIII and His Six Wives	Historical	BBC	Waris Hussein	Keith Michell, Donald Pleasence, Charlotte Rampling, Jane Asher, Lynne Frederick
I Am a Dancer	Ballet	Anglo-EMI, Demetriou Production	Pierre Jourdan	Rudolf Nureyev, Margot Fonteyn
Made	Drama	International C-Productions	John Mackenzie	Carol White, Roy Harper
Mutiny on the Buses	Comedy	Hammer	Harry Booth	Reg Varney, Anna Karen, Michael Robbins, Doris Hare
Neither the Sea Nor the Sand	Horror	LMG Film Productions Ptd., Portland Film Corp., Tigon	Fred Burnley	Susan Hampshire, Frank Finlay
Our Miss Fred	Comedy	Anglo-EMI	Bob Kellett	Danny La Rue, Alfred Marks, Lance Percival
Rentadick	Comedy	David Paradine, Rank Org, Virgin Films	Jim Clark	James Booth, Richard Briers, Julie Ege, Ronald Fraser, Donald Sinden
Straight on Till Morning	Thriller	Hammer	Peter Collinson	Rita Tushingham, Shane Briant, James Bolam, Katya Wyeth, John Clive
Up the Front	Comedy	Anglo-EMI	Bob Kellett	Frankie Howerd, Bill Fraser, Hermione Baddeley

==== Television ====
Title	Genre	Company	Series	Episodes	Years	Main director/s	Starring
The Protectors	Action thriller	Group Three	2	52	1972—1974	Jeremy Summers	Robert Vaughn, Nyree Dawn Porter, Tony Anholt

=== 1973 ===
==== Film ====
Title	Genre	Company	Director	Starring
Adolf Hitler: My Part in His Downfall	Comedy	ALF, Norcon	Norman Cohen	Jim Dale, Arthur Lowe, Bill Maynard, Tony Selby
Baxter!	Drama	Anglo-EMI, Group W, Hanna-Barbera, Performing Arts	Lionel Jeffries	Patricia Neal, Britt Ekland, Lynn Carlin, Jean-Pierre Cassel, Scott Jacoby
The Best Pair of Legs in the Business	Dramedy	Sunny Productions	Christopher Hodson	Reg Varney, Diana Coupland, Lee Montague
The Cobblers of Umbridge	Comedy		Ned Sherrin, Ian Wilson	Joan Sims, Roy Kinnear, John Fortune, Lance Percival
Digby, the Biggest Dog in the World	Fantasy-adventure comedy	Walter Shenson Films	Joseph McGrath	Jim Dale, Angela Douglas, Spike Milligan
A Doll's House	Drama	Les Films de la Boétie, World Film Services	Joseph Losey	Jane Fonda, Edward Fox, Trevor Howard
Father, Dear Father	Comedy	Sedgemoor-M.M. Films	William G. Stewart	Patrick Cargill, Natasha Pyne, Ann Holloway, Noel Dyson, Joyce Carey, Richard O'Sullivan
The Final Programme	Fantasy sci-fi thriller	Goodtimes, Gladiole Films	Robert Fuest	Jon Finch, Jenny Runacre, Hugh Griffith, Patrick Magee
Holiday on the Buses	Comedy	Hammer	Bryan Izzard	Reg Varney, Anna Karen, Doris Hare, Michael Robbins, Bob Grant, Stephen Lewis, Adam Rhodes
The Legend of Hell House	Horror	Academy Pictures Corp.	John Hough	Pamela Franklin, Roddy McDowall, Clive Revill, Gayle Hunnicutt
Love Thy Neighbour	Comedy	Hammer	John Robins	Jack Smethurst, Rudolph Walker, Kate Williams, Nina Baden-Semper
Man at the Top	Drama	Hammer, Dufton Films	Mike Vardy	Kenneth Haigh, Nanette Newman, Harry Andrews
The National Health	Comedy	Virgin Films	Jack Gold	Lynn Redgrave, Colin Blakely, Eleanor Bron, Donald Sinden, Jim Dale
Night Watch	Suspense-thriller	Brut Productions, Nightwatch Films	Brian G. Hutton	Elizabeth Taylor, Laurence Harvey, Billie Whitelaw
Not Now, Darling	Comedy	LMG Film Productions Ltd., Sedgemoor Productions, Now Now Films	Ray Cooney, David Croft	Leslie Phillips, Derren Nesbitt, Julie Ege, Ray Cooney, Barbara Windsor
The Satanic Rites of Dracula	Horror	Hammer	Alan Gibson	Christopher Lee, Peter Cushing, Michael Coles, William Franklyn, Freddie Jones, Joanna Lumley
Take Me High	Musical	The Brumburger Company, Balladeer Ltd.	David Askey	Cliff Richard, Deborah Watling, Hugh Griffith, George Cole
Voices	Horror	Hemdale, Warden	Kevin Billington	David Hemmings, Gayle Hunnicutt, Lynn Farleigh

=== 1974 ===
Title	Genre	Company	Director	Starring
Captain Kronos – Vampire Hunter	Action horror	Hammer	Brian Clemens	Horst Janson, John Carson, Caroline Munro, John Cater
Confessions of a Window Cleaner	Sex comedy	Columbia Pictures	Val Guest	Robin Askwith, Antony Booth, Linda Hayden, Sheila White, Dandy Nichols, Bill Maynard
The Dove (1974 film)	Biographical		Charles Jarrott	Joseph Bottoms, Deborah Raffin
Frankenstein and the Monster from Hell	Horror	Hammer	Terence Fisher	Peter Cushing, Shane Briant, David Prowse, Madeline Smith, John Stratton, Patrick Troughton
Great Expectations	Drama	Transcontinental Film Productions, ITC	Joseph Hardy	Michael York, Sarah Miles
The Little Prince	Musical	Stanley Donen Films	Stanley Donen	Steven Warner, Richard Kiley, Bob Fosse, Gene Wilder, Donna McKechnie, Joss Ackland, Victor Spinetti
Man About the House	Comedy	EMI	John Robins	Richard O'Sullivan, Paula Wilcox, Sally Thomsett, Yootha Joyce, Brian Murphy
Murder on the Orient Express	Mystery	G.W. Films Ltd.	Sidney Lumet	Lauren Bacall, Ingrid Bergman, Sean Connery, John Gielgud, Vanessa Redgrave, Michael York, Jacqueline Bisset, Anthony Perkins, Wendy Hiller
Percy's Progress	Comedy	Welbeck Films Ltd.	Ralph Thomas	Leigh Lawson, Elke Sommer, Judy Geeson, Denholm Elliott, Adrienne Posta, Julie Ege, Vincent Price
Swallows and Amazons	Adventure	Theatre Projects Film Productions Ltd.	Claude Whatham	Virginia McKenna, Ronald Fraser
Vampira	Comedy horror	World Film Services	Clive Donner	David Niven, Teresa Graves

=== 1975 ===
Title	Genre	Company	Director	Starring
Alfie Darling	Dramedy	Signal Pictures	Ken Hughes	Alan Price, Jill Townsend, Joan Collins, Sheila White, Paul Copley
Confessions of a Pop Performer	Sex comedy	Columbia Pictures	Norman Cohen	Robin Askwith, Anthony Booth
Galileo	Biography	Cinévision Ltée, AFT, The Ely Landau Organization Inc.	Joseph Losey	Chaim Topol, Georgia Brown, Edward Fox, John Gielgud, Margaret Leighton
Hedda	Drama	RSC	Peter Eyre	Glenda Jackson, Patrick Stewart
In Celebration	Drama	AFT	Lindsay Anderson	Alan Bates, Bill Owen, Brian Cox, James Bolam, Constance Chapman
The Maids	Drama	Cine Films Inc., Cinévision Ltée, Mantis Films	Christopher Miles	Glenda Jackson, Susannah York, Vivien Merchant
Spanish Fly	Comedy	Winkle Productions, Quadrant Films, Izaro Films	Bob Kellett	Leslie Phillips, Terry-Thomas, Graham Armitage, Sue Lloyd

=== 1976 ===
Title	Genre	Company	Director	Starring
Aces High	Action	Les Productions, S. Benjamin Fisz Productions	Jack Gold	Malcolm McDowell, Peter Firth, Christopher Plummer, Simon Ward
Confessions of a Driving Instructor	Sex comedy		Norman Cohen	Robin Askwith, Anthony Booth
Keep It Up Downstairs	Sex comedy	Pyramid Films	Robert Young	Diana Dors, Jack Wild, William Rushton
The Likely Lads	Comedy	Anglo-EMI	Michael Tuchner	Rodney Bewes, James Bolam, Brigit Forsyth
Not Now, Comrade	Comedy	Not Now Films	Ray Cooney, Harold Snoad	Leslie Phillips, Windsor Davies, Don Estelle, Ian Lavender
To the Devil a Daughter	Horror	Hammer, Terra Film	Peter Sykes	Richard Widmark, Christopher Lee, Honor Blackman, Nastassja Kinski, Denholm Elliott
Voyage of the Damned	War drama	ITC	Stuart Rosenberg	Faye Dunaway, Oskar Werner, Lee Grant, Max von Sydow, James Mason, Malcolm McDowell

=== 1977 ===
Title	Genre	Company	Director	Starring
Are You Being Served?	Comedy	Anglo-EMI	Bob Kellett	Mollie Sugden, John Inman, Frank Thornton, Trevor Bannister, Arthur Brough, Wendy Richard, Nicholas Smith
Confessions from a Holiday Camp	Sex comedy	Columbia Pictures	Norman Cohen	Robin Askwith, Anthony Booth, Bill Maynard, Doris Hare, Sheila White
Julia	Historical drama	20th Century Fox	Fred Zinnemann	Jane Fonda, Vanessa Redgrave, Jason Robards, Hal Holbrook, Rosemary Murphy, Maximillian Schell, Meryl Streep
The Making of Star Wars		20th Century Fox, Lucasfilm	Robert Guenette	
Spectre	Horror	Norway Productions, 20th Century Fox	Clive Donner	Robert Culp, Gig Young, John Hurt
Stand Up, Virgin Soldiers	Comedy	Maidenhead Films, Warner Bros.	Norman Cohen	Robin Askwith, Nigel Davenport
Star Wars	Space-opera	Lucasfilm	George Lucas	Mark Hamill, Harrison Ford, Carrie Fisher, Peter Cushing, Alec Guinness
Valentino	Biography	Chartoff-Winkler	Ken Russell	Rudolf Nureyev, Leslie Caron, Michelle Phillips, Carol Kane

=== 1978 ===
==== Film ====
Title	Genre	Company	Director	Starring
Amahl and the Night Visitors	Musical		Arvin Brown	Robert Sapolsky, Giorgio Tozzi, Willard White, Nico Castel, Teresa Stratas
The Boys from Brazil	Sci-fi thriller	ITC, Producer Circle	Franklin J. Schaffner	Gregory Peck, Laurence Olivier
The Greek Tycoon	Drama	ABKCO	J. Lee Thompson	Anthony Quinn, Jacqueline Bisset
Rosie Dixon – Night Nurse	Comedy	Columbia Pictures	Justin Cartwright	Beryl Reid, John Le Mesurier, Arthur Askey, Debbie Ash
Stevie	Biography	First Artists, Bowden Productions, Grand Metropolitan	Robert Enders	Glenda Jackson, Trevor Howard, Mona Washbourne, Alec McCowen

==== Television ====
Title	Genre	Company	Series	Episodes	Years	Main director/s	Starring
Return of the Saint	Action-adventure	ITC	1	24	1978—1979	Leslie Norman, Peter Sasdy	Ian Ogilvy

=== 1979 ===
==== Film ====
Title	Genre	Company	Director	Starring
Hanover Street	War romance	Hanover Street Productions	Peter Hyams	Harrison Ford, Lesley-Anne Down, Christopher Plummer
Lost and Found	Comedy	Gordon Film Production	Melvin Frank	George Segal, Glenda Jackson
Murder by Decree	Mystery thriller	CFDC, Famous Players, Highlight	Bob Clark	Christopher Plummer, James Mason
Quadrophenia	Drama	The Who Films Ltd	Franc Roddam	Phil Daniels, Leslie Ash, Sting
S.O.S. Titanic	Drama disaster	EMI	William Hale	David Janssen, Cloris Leachman, Susan Saint James, David Warner, Ian Holm, Helen Mirren, Harry Andrews, Beverly Ross

==== Television ====
Title	Genre	Company	Series	Episodes	Years	Main director/s	Starring
A Man Called Intrepid	Adventure	Astral, Lorimar	1	3	1979	Peter Carter	David Niven, Michael York, Barbara Hershey

=== 1980 ===
==== Film ====
Title	Genre	Company	Director	Starring
The Empire Strikes Back	Space opera	Lucasfilm	Irvin Kershner	Mark Hamill, Harrison Ford, Carrie Fisher
Flash Gordon	Space opera	Starling Productions, Famous Films	Mike Hodges	Sam J. Jones, Melody Anderson, Ornella Muti, Max von Sydow, Chaim Topol
George and Mildred	Comedy	Chips Productions, Cinema Arts International Production	Peter Frazer Jones	Yootha Joyce, Brian Murphy, Stratford Johns, Norman Eshley, Sheila Fearn, Kenneth Cope, David Barry
Never Never Land	Drama	Mimo Productions, Kimbond, Thames	Paul Annett	Petula Clark, Cathleen Nesbitt, John Castle, Anne Seymour
Rude Boy	Rockumentary		Jack Hazan, David Mingay	
The Shining	Psychological horror	Producer Circle Co., Peregrine, Hawk	Stanley Kubrick	Jack Nicholson, Shelley Duvall, Scatman Crothers, Danny Lloyd

==== Television ====
Title	Genre	Company	Series	Episodes	Years	Main director/s	Starring
Shillingbury Tales	Dramedy	Inner Circle Films, Val Guest Productions, ATV	1	7	1980—1981	Val Guest	Robin Nedwell, Diane Keen, Jack Douglas

=== 1981 ===
Title	Genre	Company	Director	Starring
Death in Venice	Drama	RM Associates, London Cultural Trust Productions, Faber & Faber	Tony Palmer	Robert Gard, John Shirley-Quirk, James Bowman, Vincent Redmon
The Great Muppet Caper	Musical comedy	ITC, Henson Associates	Jim Henson	Jim Henson, Frank Oz, Dave Goelz
Green Ice	Adventure	ITC	Ernest Day	Ryan O'Neal, Omar Sharif, Anne Archer
The Monster Club	Horror	Chips Productions, Sword or Sorcery	Roy Ward Baker	Vincent Price, Donald Pleasence, John Carradine, Stuart Whitman
Lady Chatterley's Lover	Drama romance	Cine Artist Film GmbH, Cine-Source, Cannon	Just Jaeckin	Sylvia Kristel, Nicholas Clay
Omen III: The Final Conflict	Horror	Mace Neufeld Productions	Graham Baker	Sam Neill, Lisa Harrow, Rossano Brazzi
Raiders of the Lost Ark	Action-adventure	Lucasfilm	Steven Spielberg	Harrison Ford, Karen Allen, Paul Freeman
Venom	Horror	Morison Film Group, Venom Productions Ltd.	Piers Haggard	Klaus Kinski, Oliver Reed, Nicol Williamson, Sarah Miles

=== 1982 ===
Title	Genre	Company	Director	Starring
The Dark Crystal	Dark fantasy	ITC, Henson Associates	Jim Henson, Frank Oz	Stephen Garlick, Lisa Maxwell, Billie Whitelaw, Percy Edwards, Barry Dennen
Oliver Twist	Crime drama	Claridge Productions, Grafton Productions, Norman Rosemont Productions, Trident	Clive Donner	George C. Scott, Tim Curry, Cherie Lunghi, Richard Charles
The Boys in Blue	Comedy	Apollo, MAM Ltd.	Val Guest	Tommy Cannon, Bobby Ball, Suzanne Danielle, Roy Kinnear

=== 1983 ===
Title	Genre	Company	Director	Starring
Monty Python's The Meaning of Life	Musical comedy	Celandine Films, The Monty Python Partnership	Terry Jones	Graham Chapman, John Cleese, Terry Gilliam, Eric Idle, Terry Jones, Michael Palin
Never Say Never Again	Spy	Taliafilm	Irvin Kershner	Sean Connery, Klaus Maria Brandauer, Max von Sydow, Barbara Carrera, Kim Basinger
Star Wars: Episode VI - Return of the Jedi	Space opera	Lucasfilm	Richard Marquand	Mark Hamill, Harrison Ford, Carrie Fisher

==== Television ====
Title	Genre	Company	Series	Episodes	Years	Main director/s	Starring
Reilly, Ace of Spies	Crime	Euston, Thames	1	12	1983	Martin Campbell, Jim Goddard	Sam Neill, Michael Bryant, Norman Rodway

=== 1984 ===
==== Film ====
Title	Genre	Company	Director	Starring
Cal	Drama	Goldcrest	Pat O'Connor	John Lynch, Helen Mirren
Give My Regards to Broad Street'	Musical	MPL	Peter Webb	Paul McCartney, Bryan Brown, Ringo Starr
Greystoke: The Legend of Tarzan, Lord of the Apes	Adventure	Warner Bros., Edgar Rice Burroughs, Inc., WEA Records	Hugh Hudson	Ralph Richardson, Ian Holm, James Fox, Christopher Lambert, Andie MacDowell
Indiana Jones and the Temple of Doom	Action-adventure	Lucasfilm	Steven Spielberg	Harrison Ford, Kate Capshaw, Amrish Puri, Roshan Seth, Philip Stone, Ke Huy Quan
Kim	Adventure	London Films	John Davies	Peter O'Toole, Bryan Brown, John Rhys-Davies, Nadira, Julian Glover, Jalal Agha, Raj Kapoor, Ravi Sheth
Plenty	Drama	Pressman Corp, RKO	Fred Schepisi	Meryl Streep, Charles Dance, Tracey Ullman, John Gielgud, Sting, Ian McKellen, Sam Neill
The Razor's Edge	Drama	Columbia Pictures, Colgems Productions Ltd., Marcucci-Cohen-Benn Production	John Byrum	Bill Murray, Theresa Russell, Catherine Hicks, Denholm Elliott, Brian Doyle-Murray, James Keach

==== Television ====
Title	Genre	Company	Series	Episodes	Years	Main director/s	Starring
Lace	Drama	Lorimar	1	2	1984	William Hale	Bess Armstrong, Brooke Adams, Arielle Dombasle, Phoebe Cates

=== 1985 ===
==== Film ====
Title	Genre	Company	Director	Starring
Dreamchild	Drama	Thorn-EMI	Gavin Millar	Coral Browne, Ian Holm, Peter Gallagher, Nicola Cowper, Amelia Shankley
Exploits at West Poley	Drama	CFTF	Diarmuid Lawrence	Anthony Bate, Brenda Fricker, Charlie Condou, Jonathan Jackson
Legend	Epic dark fantasy adventure	Embassy	Ridley Scott	Tom Cruise, Mia Sara, Tim Curry
Life Force	Sci-fi horror	Cannon	Tobe Hooper	Steve Railsback, Peter Firth, Frank Finlay, Mathilda May
Return to Oz	Fantasy	Walt Disney Pictures, Silver Screen	Walter Murch	Nicol Williamson, Jean Marsh, Piper Laurie, Fairuza Balk
White Nights	Musical	Delphi IV Productions	Taylor Hackford	Mikhail Baryshnikov, Gregory Hines, Helen Mirren, Isabella Rossellini
Young Sherlock Holmes	Mystery adventure	Amblin	Barry Levinson	Nicholas Rowe, Alan Cox, Anthony Higgins, Sophie Ward

==== Television ====
Title	Genre	Company	Series	Episodes	Years	Main director/s	Starring
EastEnders	Soap opera	BBC	2	8,006	1986—present	John Greening, Michael Owen Morris	Adam Woodyatt, Steve McFadden

=== 1986 ===
==== Film ====
Title	Genre	Company	Director	Starring
Duet for One	Drama	Golan-Globus	Andrei Konchalovsky	Julie Andrews, Alan Bates, Max von Sydow
Half Moon Street	Erotic thriller	RKO, Pressman Corp, Geoff Reeve Enterprises	Bob Swaim	Sigourney Weaver, Michael Caine
Labyrinth	Musical fantasy	Henson Associates, Lucasfilm	Jim Henson	David Bowie, Jennifer Connelly
Haunted Honeymoon	Comedy horror	Orion	Gene Wilder	Gene Wilder, Gilda Radner, Dom DeLuise, Jonathan Pryce, Paul L. Smith
Rawhead Rex	Fantasy slasher		George Pavlou	David Dukes, Kelly Piper, Niall Tóibín, Cora Venus Lunny, Donal McCann
Whoops Apocalypse	Comedy	ITC, Picture Partnership	Tom Bussmann	Loretta Swit, Herbert Lom, Peter Cook

==== Television ====
Title	Genre	Company	Series	Episodes	Years	Main director/s	Starring
Worlds Beyond (The Eye of Yemanja)	Horror	Brent Walker	1	13	1986—1988	John Cooper	

=== 1987 ===
==== Film ====
Title	Genre	Company	Director	Starring
Empire of the Sun	Coming-of-age war	Amblin, Warner Bros.	Steve Spielberg	Christian Bale, John Malkovich, Miranda Richardson, Nigel Havers
The Fourth Protocol	Spy	Fourth Protocol	John Mackenzie	Michael Caine, Pierce Brosnan, Ned Beatty, Ian Richardson, Joanna Cassidy
The Last Emperor	Epic biographical drama	Hemdale, Recorded Picture	Bernardo Bertolucci	John Lone, Peter O'Toole, Joan Chen, Ruocheng Ying, Victor Wong, Dennis Dun, Vivian Wu, Lisa Lu, Ryuichi Sakamoto
Nuts	Drama	Barwood Films	Martin Ritt	Barbra Streisand, Richard Dreyfuss, Maureen Stapleton, Eli Wallach
Superman IV: The Quest for Peace	Superhero	Cannon, Golan-Globus	Sidney J. Furie	Christopher Reeve, Gene Hackman, Jackie Cooper Marc McClure, Jon Cryer, Sam Wanamaker, Jim Broadbent, Mariel Hemingway, Margot Kidder
Three Kinds of Heat	Action	Cannon	Leslie Stevens	Robert Ginty, Victoria Barrett, Shakti Chen, Jeannie Brown, Leslie Clark, Malcolm Connell

==== Television ====
Title	Genre	Company	Series	Episodes	Years	Main director/s	Starring
Inspector Morse	Detective Drama	Zenith, Central, Carlton	8	33	1987—2000	John Madden, Peter Hammond, Herbert Wise, Adrian Shergold	John Thaw, Kevin Whately
Rude Health	Comedy	Channel 4	2	14	1987—1988	David MacMahon	Paul Mari, John Wells, John Bett

=== 1988 ===
==== Film ====
Title	Genre	Company	Director	Starring
Just Ask for Diamond	Comedy crime	British Screen Productions, CFTF, Coverstop Films	Stephen Bayly	Colin Dale, Saeed Jaffrey, Dursley McLinden
The Lair of the White Worm	Horror	White Lair	Ken Russell	Amanda Donohoe, Hugh Grant, Catherine Oxenberg, Peter Capaldi, Sammi Davis, Stratford Johns
Madame Sousatzka	Drama	Odeon	John Schlesinger	Shirley MacLaine, Peggy Ashcroft, Shabana Azmi, Twiggy, Leigh Lawson, Geoffrey Bayldon, Navin Chowdhury
Salome's Last Dance	Biographic dramedy	Jolly Russell Productions	Ken Russell	Glenda Jackson, Stratford Johns, Nickolas Grace, Douglas Hodge, Imogen Claire, Imogen Millais-Scott
Who Framed Roger Rabbit	Comedy mystery	Touchstone, Amblin, Silver Screen	Robert Zemeckis, Richard Williams	Bob Hoskins, Christopher Lloyd, Charles Fleischer, Stubby Kaye, Joanna Cassidy
Willow	Dark fantasy drama	Lucasfilm, Imagine, MGM	Ron Howard	Warwick Davis, Val Kilmer, Joanne Whalley, Billy Barty, Jean Marsh

==== Television ====
Title	Genre	Company	Series	Episodes	Years	Main director/s	Starring
Silent Whisper	Anthology	Lorimar			1988	Jonathan R. Betuel	David Beecroft, Richard Lawson, Claudette Nevins, Kate Vernon
Piece of Cake	War drama	LWT, Holmes Associates	1	6	1988	Ian Toynton	Tom Burlinson, Neil Dudgeon, Boyd Gaines, Nathaniel Parker, David Horovitch, Richard Hope
Wizbit series 3	Children's	Cannon	3	19	1988	David Rose, Phil Bishop	Gary Martin, Paul Daniels

=== 1989 ===
==== Film ====
Title	Genre	Company	Director	Starring
The Cook, the Thief, His Wife & Her Lover	Crime drama	Allarts, Elsevier-Vendex	Peter Greenaway	Richard Bohringer, Michael Gambon, Helen Mirren, Alan Howard
Elstree Britain's Hollywood	Documentary	BBC	Michael Denison, Bryan Forbes, Bryan Langley	
Indiana Jones and the Last Crusade	Action-adventure	Lucasfilm	Steven Spielberg	Harrison Ford, Denholm Elliott, Alison Doody, John Rhys-Davies, Julian Glover, Sean Connery
Tree of Hands	Psychological drama	Granada, British Screen Productions, Greenpoint Films	Giles Foster	Helen Shaver, Lauren Bacall Malcolm Stoddard, Peter Firth

==== Television ====
Title	Genre	Company	Series	Episodes	Years	Main director/s	Starring
Behaving Badly	Drama	Channel 4	1	4	1989	David Tucker	Judi Dench, Ronald Pickup

=== 1990 ===
==== Film ====
Title	Genre	Company	Director	Starring
A Ghost in Monte Carlo	Drama	Gainsborough, The Grade Company, Turner	John Hough	Sarah Miles, Oliver Reed, Christopher Plummer, Samantha Eggar
Othello			Trevor Nunn	Ian McKellen, Willard White, Imogen Stubbs, Zoë Wanamaker

=== 1991 ===
==== Film ====
Title	Genre	Company	Director	Starring
Duel of Hearts	Romance	Gainsborough	John Hough	Alison Doody Michael York, Geraldine Chaplin, Benedict Taylor

==== Television ====
Title	Genre	Company	Series	Episodes	Years	Main director/s	Starring
For the Greater Good	Drama	BBC	1	3	1991	Danny Boyle	Martin Shaw, Roy Dotrice, Nicholas Jones, Nicholas Woodeson

=== 1992 ===
==== Film ====
Title	Genre	Company	Director	Starring
Emily Brontë's Wuthering Heights	Historical drama	Paramount	Peter Kosminsky	Juliette Binoche, Ralph Fiennes, Janet McTeer

=== 1994 ===
==== Film ====
Title	Genre	Company	Director	Starring
Flesh and Blood: The Hammer Heritage of Horror	Documentary	Hammer, Bosustow Media Group, Heidelberg Films	Ted Newsom	Peter Cushing, Christopher Lee

==== Television ====
Title	Genre	Company	Series	Episodes	Years	Main director/s	Starring
Fun Song Factory	Children's	Tell-Tale, Abbey, Entertainment Rights			1998—2006	Will Brenton	Dave Benson Phillips, Katy Stephens
The Ink Thief	Children's	Tyne Tees	1	7	1994	Tony White	Richard O'Brien, Toyah Willcox

=== 1995 ===
==== Television ====
Title	Genre	Company	Series	Episodes	Years	Main director/s	Starring
Bliss	Abbey Films Productions, Carlton	1	5	1995—1997	Marc Evans	Simon Shepherd, Sian Webber	
Kavanagh QC	Crime drama	Carlton				Charles Beeson	John Thaw, Oliver Ford Davies, Nicholas Jones, Cliff Parisi

=== 1997 ===
==== Film ====
Title	Genre	Company	Director	Starring
Bathtime	Comedy		Russell Michaels	Alan Cumming, Julie Walters
The Borrowers	Fantasy comedy	Working Title	Peter Hewitt	John Goodman, Jim Broadbent, Celia Imrie, Mark Williams, Hugh Laurie, Bradley Pierce
Jane Eyre			Robert Young	Samantha Morton, Ciarán Hinds, Gemma Jones, Rupert Penry-Jones
Silent Whisper	Drama	United Pictures	Steven Rouse	Salliya, Anneka Svenska
The Man Who Knew Too Little	Spy comedy	Regency, Polar Productions, Taurus Film	Jon Amiel	Bill Murray, Peter Gallagher, Joanne Whalley
Tomorrow Never Dies	Spy	Eon, UA	Roger Spottiswoode	Pierce Brosnan, Jonathan Pryce, Michelle Yeoh, Teri Hatcher, Joe Don Baker, Judi Dench

==== Television ====
Title	Genre	Company	Series	Episodes	Years	Main director/s	Starring
The History of Tom Jones: a Foundling	Adventure dramedy	A+E, BBC				Metin Hüseyin	Max Beesley, Brian Blessed, Samantha Morton

=== 1998 ===
==== Film ====
Title	Genre	Company	Director	Starring
The Art of Touch	Ballet		Ross MacGibbon	Siobhan Davies Dance Co.
Peggy Su!			Frances-Anne Solomon	Jonathan Arun, Jacqueline Chan, Daphne Cheung
Saving Private Ryan	Epic war	DreamWorks, Paramount, Amblin, Mutual	Steven Spielberg	Tom Hanks, Edward Burns, Matt Damon, Tom Sizemore
Witchcraft X: Mistress of the Craft	Horror		Elisar Cabrera	Stephanie Beaton, Wendy Cooper, Eileen Daly

==== Television ====
Title	Genre	Company	Series	Episodes	Years	Main director/s	Starring
Big Woman	Drama	Bandung Productions, Channel 4	1	4	1998	Renny Rye	Anastasia Hille, Daniela Nardini, Fidelis Morgan, Annabelle Apsion, Kelle Spry, Jayne Ashbourne
Close Relations	Drama	BBC	1	5	1998	Michael Whyte	Keith Barron, Sheila Hancock, Amanda Redman, Kelly Hunter
Coming Home	Drama	YTV, Portsman Entertainment Group, Tele München Fernseh Produktionsgesellschaft				Giles Foster	Joanna Lumley, Peter O'Toole, Emily Mortimer
Imogen's Face	Drama	TYRO Productions	1	3	1998	David Wheatley	Lia Williams, Samantha Womack
Playing the Field	Drama	BBC, Tiger Aspect	5	32	1998—2002	Dermot Boyd	Ralph Ineson, Jo McInnes, Melanie Hill, Lorraine Ashbourne
Who Wants to Be a Millionaire?	Game show	Celador, Carlton, 2waytraffic, Victory	36	164	1998–2014, 2018—present		Chris Tarrant, Jeremy Clarkson

=== 1999 ===
==== Film ====
Title	Genre	Company	Director	Starring
The Colour of Justice	Drama	Nicolas Kent	Michael Culver, James Woolley, Jenny Jules, Jeremy Clyde	
David Copperfield	Drama	BBC, WGBH	Simon Curtis, Daniel Radcliffe, Ciarán McMenamin, Maggie Smith, Pauline Quirke, Alun Armstrong	
Decreit		BBC		
Gaelforce Dance				
Miss Julie	Drama	UA	Mike Figgis	Saffron Burrows, Peter Mullan
Nancherrow	Drama	Heue Tonfilm, Tele München Fernseh Produktionsgesellschaft, Portman Productions	Simon Langton	Joanna Lumley, Tristan Gemmill, Robert Hardy, Lynda Baron
Virtual Sexuality	Sci-fi drama	The Noel Gay Motion Picture Company	Nick Hurran	Laura Fraser, Rupert Penry-Jones, Luke de Lacey, Kieran O'Brien

==== Television ====
Title	Genre	Company	Series	Episodes	Years	Main director/s	Starring
Big Bad World	Drama	Carlton	3	16	1999—2001	Udayan Prasad	Ardal O'Hanlon, Beth Goddard
Kid in the Corner	Drama	Target Television	1	3	1999	Bille Eltringham	Rosie Rowell
Oliver Twist	Drama	Diplomat Films, HTV, United	1	4	1999	Renny Rye	Annette Crosbie, Marc Warren, Michael Kitchen, Lindsay Duncan, Julie Walters, David Ross
Robot Wars	Robot combat competition		12	177	1998–2004, 2016—2018	Muche Madhovi, Stephen Stewart, Nikki Parsons	Jonathan Pearce, Noel Sharkey, Craig Charles
Smack the Pony	Sketch comedy	TalkBack	4	31	1999—2003	Dominic Brigstocke	Fiona Allen, Doon Mackichan, Sally Phillips, Sarah Alexander, Darren Boyd
Small Potatoes	Sitcom	Hat Trick	2	13	1999—2001	Paul Duane	Tommy Tiernan, Sanjeev Bhaskar, Omid Djalili
Tweenies	Children's	Tell-Tale, BBC	7	502	1999—2003	Kay Benbow, Kathryne Wolfe, Helen Sheppard	Colleen Daley, Justin Fletcher, Bob Golding
The Vice	Police drama	Carlton, Touchpaper Television	5	28	1999—2003	Roger Gartland	Caroline Catz, David Harewood, Ken Stott
Wives and Daughters	Drama	BBC, Dune Films, WGBH	1	4	1999	Nicholas Renton	Francesca Annis, Justine Waddell, Bill Paterson, Keeley Hawes, Deborah Findlay, Barbara Flynn

=== 2000 ===
==== Film ====
Title	Genre	Company	Director	Starring
Gangster No. 1	Crime Drama	Film4, Pagoda Film and Television Corp., Road Movies, British Screen Productions, BSkyB, Filmboard Berlin-Brandenburg, NFH Productions, Little Bird	Paul McGuigan	Malcolm MacDowell, David Thewlis, Saffron Burrows
Saving Grace	Comedy		Nigel Cole	Brenda Blethyn, Craig Ferguson
Sorted	Thriller	Excell Film Agentur, Jovy Junior Enterprises	Alexander Jovy	Matthew Rhys, Sienna Guillory, Fay Masterson, Tim Curry

==== Television ====
Title	Genre	Company	Series	Episodes	Years	Main director/s	Starring
Big Brother	Reality game show	Bazal, Brighter, Channel 4	19	1,120	2000—2018	Marc Butler, Graham Proud, Alex Scott, Hayley MacFarlane	Marcus Bentley, Davina McCall
Hearts and Bones	Drama	Meridian, United	2	13	2000—2001	Tom Shankland	Dervla Kirwan, Damian Lewis, Andrew Scarborough, Sarah Parish, Amanda Holden, Hugo Speer, Rose Keegan
Madame Bovary	Drama	WGBH	1	2	2000	Tim Fywell	Frances O'Connor, Greg Wise, Hugh Dancy
The People Versus	Game show	Celador	2	125	2000—2002		Kirsty Young, Kaye Adams
The Strangerers	Sci-fi dramedy	Absolutely Television, Taken for Granted Productions Ltd.	1	9	2000	Liddy Oldroyd, Nick Wood	Mark Williams, Jack Docherty, Sarah Alexander
Tough Love	Crime drama	Granada				David Drury, Andy Wilson	Ray Winstone, Adrian Dunbar, David Hayman

=== 2001 ===
==== Film ====
Title	Genre	Company	Director	Starring
Enigma	Espionage thriller	Jagged, Broadway	Michael Apted	Dougray Scott, Kate Winslet, Jeremy Northam, Saffron Burrows, Tom Hollander
New Year's Day	Dramedy		Suri Krishnamma	Andrew Lee Potts, Bobby Barry, Jacqueline Bisset, Anastasia Hille, Michael Kitchen, Sue Johnston, Ralph Brown, Marianne Jean-Baptiste

==== Television ====
Title	Genre	Company	Series	Episodes	Years	Main director/s	Starring
Anybody's Nightmare	Crime drama	Carlton	1	1	2001	Tristram Powell	Patricia Routledge, Georgina Sutcliffe, Thomas Arnold, Jean Ainslie, David Calder, Malcolm Sinclair, William Armstrong, Nicola Redmond
Britain's Brainiest Kid	Game show	Celador			2001—2002		Carol Vorderman, Tess Daly
The Hoobs	Children's	Henson Associates, Decode	5	250	2001—2003	Simon Spencer	Don Austen, John Eccleston, Brian Herring, Julie Westwood, Gillie Robic, Mark Jefferis, Brian Herring
Jack and the Beanstalk: The Real Story		Hallmark, Henson Associates	1	2	2001	Brian Henson	Matthew Modine, Mia Sara, Jon Voight, Vanessa Redgrave
My Uncle Silas	Dramedy	Excelsior, WGBH, YTV	2	9	2001—2003	Tom Clegg, Philip Saville	Albert Finney, Sue Johnston, Joe Prospero
Two Thousand Acres of Sky	Drama	Zenith	3	22	2001—2003	Dermot Boyd	Michelle Collins, Paul Kaye
Under Pressure	Game show	Endemol					Ruth England, Daley Thompson, Russ Williams
Victoria & Albert	Historical	A+E, BBC, Own2feet Productions	1	2	2001	John Erman	Victoria Hamilton, Jonathan Firth
The Way We Live Now	Drama	BBC, WGBH, Deep Indigo	1	4	2001	David Yates	David Suchet, Matthew Macfadyen, Shirley Henderson, Cillian Murphy

=== 2002 ===
==== Film ====
Title	Genre	Company	Director	Starring
Aka Albert Walker	Thriller	Atlantis, BBC, CTV	Harry Hook	John Gordon Sinclair, Alan Scarfe, Sarah Manninen, Lesley Dunlop
Daddy's Girl	Drama	Meridian	Bill Eagles	Martin Kemp, Stephanie Leonidas
Paradise Heights	Drama	BBC	David Innes Edwards, Ashley Pearce, Paul Harrison, Rob Evans	Neil Morrissey, Charles Dale, Ralf Little, David Troughton
The Importance of Being Earnest	Romantic comedy-drama	Ealing, UKFC, Fragile Films, Newmarket	Oliver Parker	Rupert Everett, Colin Firth, Frances O'Connor, Reese Witherspoon, Judi Dench, Tom Wilkinson, Anne Massey, Edward Fox
The Final Curtain	Drama	DNA, Young Crossbow Productions	Patrick Harkins	Peter O'Toole
Nicholas Nickleby	Period dramedy	Hart-Sharp Entertainment, Potboiler Productions, UA	Douglas McGrath	Charlie Hunnam, Nathan Lane, Jim Broadbent, Christopher Plummer, Jamie Bell, Anne Hathaway, Romola Garai, Alan Cumming, Timothy Spall
Star Wars: Episode II – Attack of the Clones	Space-opera	Lucasfilm	George Lucas	Ewan McGregor, Natalie Portman, Hayden Christensen, Ian McDiarmid, Samuel L. Jackson, Christopher Lee, Anthony Daniels, Kenny Baker, Frank Oz

==== Television ====
Title	Genre	Company	Series	Episodes	Years	Main director/s	Starring
All About Me	Sitcom	Celador, Razor Television	3	22	2002—2004	Nick Wood	Jasper Carrott, Nina Wadia
Big Brother / Celebrity Big Brother	Reality game show	Bazal, Endemol, Remarkable, Initial, Channel 4, Channel 5	22		2002—2018	Ben Hardy, Marc Butler	Davina McCall, Marcus Bentley, Brian Dowling, Emma Willis
Big Brother's Little Brother	Reality game show	Endemol, Remarkable, Initial, Channel 4	9		2002—2010	Liz Clare, Alex Rudzinski, Kate Douglas-Walker	Dermot O'Leary, George Lamb
Boo!	Children's animated	Tell-Tale	2				
Crime and Punishment	Crime drama	BBC	1	2	2002	Julian Jarrold	John Simm, Ian McDiarmid, Shaun Dingwall, Geraldine James, Kate Ashfield, Laura Belmont, Mark Benton, Katrin Cartlidge
Messiah 2: Vengeance is Mine	Drama	BBC Northern Ireland, Vengeance Films				David Richards	Frances Grey, Gillian Taylforth, Emily Joyce, Dani Biernat

=== 2003 ===
==== Film ====
Title	Genre	Company	Director	Starring
Ashes & Sand	Drama	Matador Pictures, Open Road Films	Bob Blagden	Nick Moran, Lara Belmont, Beccy Armory, Sarah French-Ellis, Jessica Harris
From Hollywood to Borehamwood	Documentary		Caius Julyan	Jamie Russell, Richard Attenborough, Tim Bevan, Peter Capaldi, Ben Kingsley, Christopher Lee
The Gathering	Thriller, horror	Granada, Isle of Man Film Commission, Samuelson Productions	Brian Gilbert	Christina Ricci
Lloyd & Hill	Crime drama	Carlton	Phillippa Langdale	Phillip Glenister, Michelle Collins, Shaun Dingwall, John Light
Margery & Gladys	Drama	Carlton	Geoffrey Sax	Penelope Keith, June Brown
Shanghai Knights	Action comedy	Touchstone, Spyglass Entertainment, Birnbaum/Barber Productions, Jackie Chan Films Limited, All Knight Productions Inc.	David Dobkin	Jackie Chan, Owen Wilson, Fann Wong, Donnie Yen, Aidan Gillen

==== Television ====
Title	Genre	Company	Series	Episodes	Years	Main director/s	Starring
Brainiac: Science Abuse	Entertainment documentary		6	58	2003—2008	Peter Eyre	Richard Hammond, Jon Tickle, Charlotte Hudson, Thalia Zucchi
Coming Up	Anthology	Ideal World Productions, Touchpaper Television	11	79	2003—2013		
Keen Eddie	Action dramedy	Frequency Films, Simon West Productions, The Littlefield Company, Paramount	1	13	2003	Simon West	Mark Valley, Sienna Miller, Julian Rhind-Tutt, Colin Salmon
The Lost Prince	Drama	Talkback	1	2	2003	Stephen Poliakoff	Matthew James Thomas, Miranda Richardson, Tom Hollander, Bill Nighy
Peep Show	Sitcom	Objective	9	54	2003—2015	Jeremy Wooding, Tristram Shapeero, Becky Martin	David Mitchell, Robert Webb

=== 2004 ===
==== Film ====
Title	Genre	Company	Director	Starring
Agent Cody Banks 2: Destination London	Action comedy	Splendid Pictures, Maverick, Dylan Sellers Productions, MGM	Kevin Allen	Frankie Muniz, Anthony Anderson, Hannah Spearritt
Closer	Romantic drama	Columbia Pictures	Mike Nichols	Julia Roberts, Jude Law, Natalie Portman, Clive Owen
Sky Captain and the World of Tomorrow	Sci-fi adventure	Filmauro, Brooklyn Films, Natural Nylon	Kerry Conran	Gwyneth Paltrow, Jude Law, Giovanni Ribisi, Michael Gambon, Bai Ling, Omid Djalili, Angelina Jolie
Troy	Historical war	Warner Bros., Helena Productions, Latina Pictures, Radiant, Plan B, Nimar Studios	Wolfgang Petersen	Brad Pitt, Eric Bana, Orlando Bloom, Diane Kruger, Brian Cox, Sean Bean, Brendan Gleeson, Peter O'Toole
Vanity Fair	Historical drama	Granada	Mira Nair	Reese Witherspoon, Eileen Atkins, Jim Broadbent, Gabriel Byrne, Romola Garai, Bob Hoskins, Rhys Ifans, James Purefoy, Jonathan Rhys Meyers

==== Television ====
Title	Genre	Company	Series	Episodes	Years	Main director/s	Starring
Big Brother's Big Mouth	Reality game show	Endemol, Brighter, E4	8	80	2004—2010	James Longman, Dave Skinner	Russell Brand
Casualty@Holby City	Medicine	BBC	1	6	2004—2005	Eamon O'Sullivan	Ian Bleasdale, Martina Laird
Family Business	Drama	Tiger Aspect	1	6	2004	Sarah Harding, Tom Shankland	Jamie Foreman, Elizabeth Berrington, Michael Tucek, Meg Wynn Owen, Trevor Peacock, Abbie Nichols, Claire Rushbrook

=== 2005 ===
==== Film ====
Title	Genre	Company	Director	Starring
Class of '76	Drama	Zenith	Ashley Pearce	Robert Carlyle, Daniel Mays, Claire Skinner, Robert Glenister, Sean Gallagher, Tony Haygarth, Anton Lesser
Colour Me Kubrick	Dramedy	Canal+, Isle of Man Film, Colour Me K Limited, First Choice Films, TPS Star	Brian W. Cook	John Malkovich
Derailed	Crime thriller	Miramax Films	Mikael Håfström	Clive Owen, Jennifer Aniston, Vincent Cassel, David Morrissey, RZA, Xzibit
Generation Jedi	Documentary	Murfia Productions, BBC	Paul Connolly	Dermot O'Leary
The Hitchhiker's Guide to the Galaxy	Sci-fi comedy	Touchstone, Spyglass Entertainment, Hammer & Tongs Productions, Everyman Pictures	Garth Jennings	Martin Freeman, Sam Rockwell, Mos Def, Zooey Deschanel, Bill Nighy, Alan Rickman, Anna Chancellor, John Malkovich
Peace & Quiet	Comedy	FAC TV	Nick Reed	Annabelle Apsion, Simon Day, Lawrence Finlay, Sorcha Mellor-Reed
Proof	Drama	Miramax, Endgame Entertainment, Hart Sharp	John Madden	Gwyneth Paltrow, Anthony Hopkins, Jake Gyllenhaal, Hope Davis
Star Wars: Episode III – Revenge of the Sith	Space-opera	Lucasfilm	George Lucas	Ewan McGregor, Natalie Portman Hayden Christensen, Ian McDiarmid, Samuel L. Jackson, Christopher Lee, Anthony Daniels, Kenny Baker, Frank Oz

==== Television ====
Title	Genre	Company	Series	Episodes	Years	Main director/s	Starring
Bleak House	Crime drama	BBC, WGBH, Deep Indigo	1	15	2005	Justin Chadwick, Susanna White	Anna Maxwell Martin, Denis Lawson, Carey Mulligan
Celebrity Wrestling	Reality show	Granada	1	8	2006		Roddy Piper, Kate Thornton
Mock the Week	Topical satirical panel	Angst Productions	20	228	2005—present	Geraldine Dowd	Dara Ó Briain, Hugh Dennis

=== 2006 ===
==== Film ====
Title	Genre	Company	Director	Starring
Amazing Grace	Biographical drama	FourBoys, Walden, Bristol Bay, Ingenious	Michael Apted	Ioan Gruffudd, Romola Garai, Ciaran Hinds, Rufus Sewell
Breaking and Entering	Romantic crime drama	TWC, Miramax, Mirage	Anthony Minghella	Jude Law, Juliette Binoche, Robin Wright
Flyboys	Drama	Ingenious, EE, Skydance, MGM	Tony Bill	James Franco, Martin Henderson, David Ellison, Jennifer Decker, Jean Reno
Miss Potter	Biographical drama	Phoenix, UKFC, BBC, Grosvenor Park Media, Isle of Man	Chris Noonan	Renée Zellweger, Lloyd Owen, Ewan McGregor, Bill Paterson, Emily Watson
Notes on a Scandal	Psychological thriller-drama	Searchlight, DNA, UKFC	Richard Eyre	Judi Dench, Cate Blanchett
Sixty Six	Biographical dramedy	Working Title, StudioCanal, WT2, Ingenious	Paul Weiland	Gregg Sulkin, Helena Bonham Carter, Eddie Marsan, Stephen Rea

==== Television ====
Title	Genre	Company	Series	Episodes	Years	Main director/s	Starring
Dancing on Ice	Competition	ITV	13	210	2006—present	Sam Buckley	Phillip Schofield, Jayne Torvill, Christopher Dean, Jason Gardiner, Karen Barber
Doodle Do	Children's				2006—2010	Helen Darrington	Chris Corcoran, Jishnu Raghavan, Yvonne Stone, Adam Carter, Don Austen, Mark Mander
Genie in the House	Sitcom	Moi j'aime la television S.A, Helion Pictures	4	78	2006—2010	Phil Ox, Steven Bawol	Wayne Morris, Katie Sheridan, Vicky Longley, Jordan Metcalfe, Angus Kennedy, Victoria Gay
Jim Jam and Sunny	Children's	Wish Films, Entertainment Rights	1	45	2006—2008	Michael Towner	Emily Dormer, Simon Feilder, Ashley Slater, Cecily Fay, Bob Golding, Justin Fletcher
Morning Glory	Breakfast show	Channel 4	1	16	2006		Dermot O'Leary
The Slammer	Children's talent show	BBC	6	83	2006—2014	Jeanette Goulbourn, John Payne	Ted Robbins, Ian Kirkby
Tsunami: The Aftermath	Disaster drama	HBO	1	2	2006	Bharat Nalluri	Tim Roth, Chiwetel Ejiofor, Sophie Okonedo, Hugh Bonneville, Samrit Machielsen, Toni Collette

=== 2007 ===
==== Film ====
Title	Genre	Company	Director	Starring
1408	Psychological horror	Dimension, dB	Mikael Håfström	John Cusack, Samuel L. Jackson, Mary McCormack, Tony Shalhoub
A Class Apart	Drama	BBC, Paloma Productions	Nick Hurran	Jessie Wallace, Nathaniel Parker
Hot Fuzz	Buddy cop action comedy	StudioCanal, Working Title, Big Talk	Edgar Wright	Simon Pegg, Nick Frost, Jim Broadbent

==== Television ====
Title	Genre	Company	Series	Episodes	Years	Main director/s	Starring
Bunnytown	Children's	Spiffy, Baker Coogan Productions	1	26	2007—2008	David Rudman	Andrew Buckley, Polly Frame, Ed Gaughan
Secret Diary of a Call Girl	Drama	Tiger Aspect, Silver Apples Media, Artist Rights Group	4	32	2007—2011	Yann Demange, Susan Tully	Billie Piper, Iddo Goldberg, Cherie Lunghi, Ashley Madekwe
Trapped!	Children's game show	BBC	4	52	James Morgan	Simon Greenall, Eve Karpf, Faith Brown, Olly Pike	
Jackanory Junior	Children's	BBC			2007–2008		Amanda Abington, Holly Aird, Martin Clunes

=== 2008 ===
Title	Genre	Company	Director	Starring
Alien Love Triangle	Comedy sci-fi	Figment Films	Danny Boyle	Kenneth Branagh, Alice Connor, Courteney Cox, Heather Graham
Dustbin Baby	Drama	Kindle	Juliet May	Dakota Blue Richards, Juliet Stevenson, David Haig
In Your Dreams	Romantic comedy	Magnet Films	Gary Sinyor	Dexter Fletcher, Elize du Toit
Is Anybody There?	Drama	Heydey, BBC, Big Beach, Odyssey	John Crowley	Michael Caine, David Morrissey, Anne-Marie Duff, Bill Milner
Made of Honour	Romantic comedy	Columbia, Original, Relativity	Paul Weiland	Patrick Dempsey, Michelle Monaghan, Sydney Pollack
My Zinc Bed	Drama	BBC, HBO	David Hare	Paddy Considine, Jonathan Pryce, Uma Thurman
The Other Boleyn Girl	Historical romantic drama	Columbia Pictures, Relativity, BBC, Focus, Scott Rudin, Ruby	Justin Chadwick	Natalie Portman, Scarlett Johansson, Eric Bana, Kristin Scott Thomas, Mark Rylance, David Morrissey
A Number	Drama	BBC, HBO, Rainmark Films	James MacDonald	Rhys Ifans, Tom Wilkinson
Shifty	Crime thriller	Between the Eyes, Film London Microwave	Eran Creevy	Riz Ahmed, Daniel Mays, Jason Flemyng, Nitin Ganatra, Francesca Annis
Son of Rambow	Comedy	Celluloid Dreams, Hammer & Tongs, ZDF, Arte, Soficinéma	Garth Jennings	Bill Milner, Will Poulter, Jules Sitruk, Jessica Hynes, Neil Dudgeon, Anna Wing, Ed Westwick, Eric Sykes
Wild Child	Teen comedy	StudioCanal, Relativity, Working Title	Nick Moore	Emma Roberts, Alex Pettyfer, Georgia King, Natasha Richardson

=== 2009 ===
==== Film ====
Title	Genre	Company	Director	Starring
44 Inch Chest	Dramedy	Anonymous	Malcolm Venville	Ray Winstone, Ian McShane, Tom Wilkinson, Stephen Dillane, Joanne Whalley
Amy	Drama	Paul Burton Films	Paul Burton	Michelene-Philippe Heine, Emma Fletcher, Perdita Lawton, Freya Saddler
Bright Star	Biographical fiction romantic drama	BBC, Screen Australia, UKFC, Screen NSW, Pathé	Jane Campion	Ben Whishaw, Abbie Cornish, Paul Schneider, Kerry Fox, Thomas Brodie-Sangster
Exam	Psychological thriller	Bedlam, Hazeldine Films	Stuart Hazeldine	Colin Salmon, Chris Carey, Jimi Mistry, Luke Mably, Gemma Chan, Chukwudi Iwuji, John Lloyd Fillingham, Pollyanna McIntosh, Adar Beck, Nathalie Cox
Harry Brown	Vigilante action-thriller	Marv Partners, UKFC, HanWay, Prescience, Framestore	Daniel Barber	Michael Caine, Emily Mortimer, Jack O'Connell, Liam Cunningham
Waiting for Gorgo	Comedy	Cinemagine, Union Roth Capital	Benjamin Craig	Geoffrey Davies, Kelly Eastwood, Nicholas Amer

==== Television ====
Title	Genre	Company	Series	Episodes	Years	Main director/s	Starring
Gigglebiz	Children's	BBC	5	114	2009—present	Jack Jameson, Geoff Coward	Justin Fletcher
Girl Number 9	Thriller		1	3	2009	James Moran, Dan Turner	Gareth David-Lloyd, Joe Absolom, Tracy-Ann Oberman
Let's Sing and Dance for Sport Relief	Reality	Whizz Kid Entertainment	6	25	2009—2017		Steve Jones, Claudia Winkleman, Alex Jones, Mel Giedroyc, Sue Perkins
Little Howard's Big Question	Children's		3	39	2009—2011	Bruce Webb, Dermot Canterbury	Howard Read
Murderland	Crime drama	Touchpaper Scotland	1	3	2009	Catherine Morshead	Bel Powley, Robbie Coltrane, Amanda Hale
Pointless	Quiz show	Brighter, Remarkable			2009—present	Richard van't Riet, Will Clough, Julian Smith	Alexander Armstrong, Richard Osman

=== 2010 ===
==== Film ====
Title	Genre	Company	Director	Starring
20:01	Drama	BBC, Originfilms	Richard Platt	Jamie Baughan, Tim Bentinck, Michael Burgess, Thor Guichard, Barbara Marten
Bonded by Blood	Crime drama	Gateway, Prime Focus	Sacha Bennett	Tamer Hassan, Vincent Regan, Adam Deacon
Devil's Playground	Horror	Black & Blue Films, HMR Films, Widescreen, Intandem	Mark McQueen	Danny Dyer, Craig Fairbrass, MyAnna Buring, Jamie Murray
Dragon Soccer	Action	Factory Publishing	Howard Webster	Joey Ansah, Chloé Bruce, Brendan Carr
Incorporated	Drama		Nick White	Luke Harris, Adrian Annis, Max Berendt, Sal Bolton
Kick-Ass	Black comedy superhero	Marv Films, Plan B	Matthew Vaughn	Aaron Johnson, Christopher Mintz-Plasse, Chloë Grace Moretz, Mark Strong, Nicolas Cage
The King's Speech	Historical drama	UKFC, Momentum, Aegis Film Fund, Molinare, London, FilmNation, See-Saw, Bedlam	Tom Hooper	Colin Firth, Geoffrey Rush, Helena Bonham Carter, Guy Pearce
Le Fear	Comedy	AJC Production, JCP, New Breed Productions	Jason Croot	Kyri Saphiris, Spencer Austin, Lucinda Rhodes-Flaherty
Resentment	Drama	Greensleeves Films, Paul Burton Films	Paul Burton	Vicki Michelle, Louise Michelle, Emma Fletcher
Reuniting the Rubins	Dramedy	Balagan Productions, Factor Films	Yoav Factor	Timothy Spall, Rhona Mitra, James Callis
Sus	Drama	Thin Film Productions, Mensch Films, 3rd Eye Films	Robert Heath	Ralph Brown, Clint Dyer, Rafe Spall
Yoghurt	Comedy romance	Cupsogue Pictures, Scruffy Bear Pictures	Darren S. Cook	Hayley Emma Otway, Tom Toal

==== Television ====
Title	Genre	Company	Series	Episodes	Years	Main director/s	Starring
Ant & Dec's Push the Button	Game show	Gallowgate Productions	2	14	2010—2011		Declan Donnelly, Anthony McPartlin
Dancing on Wheels	Reality competition	BBC, Tiger Aspect	1	6	2010		James Jordan, Ola Jordan, Ace Adepitan
Grandma's House	Sitcom	Tiger Aspect	2	12	2010—2012	Christine Gernon	Simon Amstell, Linda Bassett, Rebecca Front, Samantha Spiro, James Smith, Jamal Hadjkura
A League of Their Own	Comedy panel game	CPL Productions 16		202	2010—present	Richard van't Riet	Andrew Flintoff, Jamie Redknapp, James Corden
Little Crackers	Dramedy	Blue Door Adventures, Phil Mcintyre Television, Sprout, Tiger Aspect, Silver River, Renegade Pictures, Glassbox Productions, Avalon, Can Communicate			2010—2012		Stephen Fry, Catherine Tate, Chris O'Dowd, Kathy Burke, Victoria Wood, Bill Bailey
Mad About the House	Reality						

=== 2011 ===
==== Film ====
Title	Genre	Company	Director	Starring
Harry Potter and the Deathly Hallows – Part 2	Fantasy	Warner Bros., Heyday	David Yates	Daniel Radcliffe, Rupert Grint, Emma Watson
Hotel Caledonia	Horror comedy			Jemima Rooper, Kris Marshall, James Cosmo, Leslie Phillips, Emily Booth
Love's Kitchen	Romantic comedy	Just Nuts Films, Trifle Films	James Hacking	Dougray Scott, Claire Forlani, Simon Callow, Gordon Ramsey
Loyalty	Crime		James Sharpe	David Lyddon, James Sharpe
Michael Bublé: Home for Christmas	Music special	ITV		Michael Bublé
Page Eight	Political thriller	Carnival, Runaway Fridge, BBC, Heyday	David Hare	Bill Nighy, Rachel Weisz, Michael Gambon, Ralph Fiennes, Judy Davis
Sherlock Holmes: A Game of Shadows	Period mystery action	Warner Bros., VRP, Silver, Wigram	Guy Ritchie	Robert Downey Jr., Jude Law, Noomi Rapace, Stephen Fry, Jared Harris, Rachel McAdams
Stormhouse	Horror	Scanner-Rhodes Productions	Dan Turner	Grant Masters, Katie Flynn
The Veteran	Action	DMK Productions, Insight	Matthew Hope	Toby Kebbell, Brian Cox, Tony Curran, Adi Bielski
Will	Sports drama	Strangelove Films, Galatafilm	Ellen Perry	Damian Lewis, Jane March, Bob Hoskins, Kristian Kiehling
X-Men: First Class	Superhero	Marvel, Donners, Bad Hat Harry, Dune, Ingenious	Matthew Vaughn	James McAvoy, Michael Fassbender, Rose Byrne, Jennifer Lawrence, January Jones, Oliver Platt, Kevin Bacon

==== Television ====
Title	Genre	Company	Series	Episodes	Years	Main director/s	Starring
Episodes	Sitcom	Hat Trick, Crane/Klarik Productions, Showtime	5	41	2011—2017	Iain B. MacDonald	Matt LeBlanc, Stephen Mangan, Tamsin Greig
Friday Download	Children's	Saltbeef Productions	9	104	2011—2015	Tim Van Someren	Molly Rainford, Anaïs Gallagher, Harvey Cantwell, Akai Osei, Leondre Devries, Charlie Lenehan
Horrible Histories: Gory Games	Game show	BBC	5	66	2011—2018	Dominic Brigstocke	Dave Lamb, Scott Brooker
Loveland	Dating game show	Sky1	0	0	n/a		Cilla Black
Red or Black?	Game show	Syco, ITV	2	14	2011—2012	Yemisi Brookes, Craig Pickles	Ant & Dec

=== 2012 ===
==== Film ====
Title	Genre	Company	Director	Starring
Booked Out	Dramedy	BON Productions, Balagan Productions, Salani Films	Bryan O'Neil	Mirren Burke, Rollo Weeks, Claire Garvey, Sylvia Syms
Comes a Bright Day	Thriller drama	Ipso Facto, Cinema Six, Smudge Films	Simon Aboud	Craig Roberts, Imogen Poots, Timothy Spall, Kevin McKidd
Hyde Park on Hudson	Historical dramedy	Daybreak, Film4, Free Range	Roger Michell	Bill Murray, Olivia Colman, Laura Linney
Red Tails	War	Lucasfilm	Anthony Hemingway	Terrence Howard, Cuba Gooding Jr.
The Wedding Video	Comedy	Squirrel Films, Timeless Films	Nigel Cole	Rufus Hound, Lucy Punch, Robert Webb

==== Television ====
Title	Genre	Company	Series	Episodes	Years	Main director/s	Starring
The Exit List	Game show	Gogglebox, Victory	1	7	2012	Mark Gentile, Richard van't Riet	Matt Allwright
The Last Leg	Comedy, sketch	Open Mike	20	235	2012	Tommy Forbes	Adam Hills, Josh Widdicombe, Alex Brooker
The Ministry of Curious Stuff		CBBC	1	13	2012—2012	Jeanette Goulbourn	Vic Reeves, Dan Renton Skinner, Beth Rylance, Tyger Drew-Honey
Very Important People	Sketch	Running Bare Pictures	1	6	2012	James de Frond	Morgana Robinson, Terry Mynott, Francine Lewis, Liam Hourican
The Voice UK	Singing competition	Talpa, Wall to Wall			2012—2014	Storm Keating, Michael Fraser, Tony Testa	will.i.am, Tom Jones

=== 2013 ===
==== Film ====
Title	Genre	Company	Director	Starring
All Stars	Dance	Square One, UFA, Vertigo	Ben Gregor	Theo Stevenson, Akai Osei-Mansfield, Ashley Jensen
Hummingbird	Action drama	IM, Shoebox Films, Shine	Steven Knight	Jason Statham, Agata Buzek
Jack the Giant Slayer	Fantasy adventure	New Line, Legendary, Original, Big Kid, Bad Hat Harry	Bryan Singer	Nicholas Hoult, Eleanor Tomlinson, Stanley Tucci, Ian McShane, Bill Nighy, Ewan McGregor
The Last Days on Mars	Sci-fi horror	BFI, IFB, Qwerty, Fantastic, Focus	Ruairí Robinson	Liev Schreiber, Elias Koteas, Romola Garai, Goran Kostić, Johnny Harris, Tom Cullen, Yusra Warsama, Olivia Williams
Little Favour	Action thriller	SunnyMarch	Patrick Viktor Monroe	Benedict Cumberbatch, Colin Salmon, Nick Moran
The Look of Love	Biopic	Film4, Baby Cow, Revolution, Anton, Lipsync Productions	Michael Winterbottom	Steve Coogan, Imogen Poots, Anna Friel, Tamsin Egerton
Mrs. Impossible				
Under the Skin	Sci-fi	BFI, Film4	Jonathan Glazer	Scarlett Johansson
Uwantme2killhim?	Drama-thriller	Andrew Douglas Company, Anonymous, Bad Hat Harry	Andrew Douglas	Jamie Blackley, Toby Regbo, Joanne Froggatt
World War Z	Zombie apocalyptic horror	Skydance, Hemisphere Media Capital, GK, Plan B, 2DUX²	Marc Forster	Brad Pitt, Mireille Enos, James Badge Dale, Matthew Fox
The World's End	Sci-fi comedy	Relativity, StudioCanal, Working Title, Big Talk, Dentsu	Edgar Wright	Simon Pegg, Nick Frost, Paddy Considine, Martin Freeman, Eddie Marsan, Rosamund Pike

==== Television ====
Title	Genre	Company	Series	Episodes	Years	Main director/s	Starring
The Big Fat Quiz of the '80s	Game show	Hot Sauce				Mick Thomas	Jimmy Carr
Fake Reaction	Comedy panel game show	STV Studios	2	18	2013—2014	Ian Lorimer	Ellie Taylor, Joe Swash
Father Figure	Sitcom	BBC	1	6	2013	Nick Wood	Jason Byrne, Karen Taylor, Pauline McLynn, Dermot Crowley, Michael Smiley
My Mad Fat Diary	Teen dramedy	Tiger Aspect	3	16	2013—2015	Alex Winckler	Sharon Rooney, Claire Rushbrook, Dan Cohen, Ian Hart, Jodie Comer, Nico Mirallegro
Strictly Come Dancing	Reality Dance Competition	BBC Studios	19	452	2004—present	Nikki Parsons	Alan Dedicoat, Craig Revel Horwood, Tess Daly, Claudia Winkleman, Bruno Tonioli
Sweat the Small Stuff	Comedy panel	Talkback	4	31	2013—2015		Nick Grimshaw, Melvin Odoom, Rochelle Humes
Yonderland	Sitcom	Working Title	3	25	2013—2016	Steve Connelly, David Sant	Martha Howe-Douglas, Mathew Baynton, Jim Howick, Simon Farnaby
Your Face Sounds Familiar	Talent show	Initial	1	6	2013	Nick Harris, Julian Smith	Alesha Dixon, Paddy McGuinness, Emma Bunton, Julian Clary

=== 2014 ===
==== Film ====
Title	Genre	Company	Director	Starring
Cuban Fury	Romantic comedy	Big Talk, BFI, Film4	James Griffiths	Nick Frost, Rashida Jones, Chris O'Dowd, Ian McShane
The Hooligan Factory	Hooliganism spoof	Altitude	Nick Nevern	Nick Nevern, Jason Maza, Tom Burke, Ray Fearon
Paddington	Live-action animated comedy	Heyday, StudioCanal, TF1	Paul King	Hugh Bonneville, Ben Whishaw, Sally Hawkins, Julia Walters, Jim Broadbent, Peter Capaldi, Nicole Kidman
Pudsey the Dog: The Movie	Family comedy	Syco, Infinite Wisdom Studios, Vertigo, Roar Films	Nick Moore	David Walliams, Jessica Hynes, John Sessions, Olivia Colman
From Borehamwood to Hollywood: The Rise and Fall and Rise of Elstree	Documentary	The Curators!	Howard Berry	Barbara Windsor, Paul Welsh, Roger Moore, Steven Spielberg, Christiane Kubrick

==== Television ====
Title	Genre	Company	Series	Episodes	Years	Main director/s	Starring
Celebrity Juice	Comedy panel game show	Talkback, Talkback Thames			2014—present	Toby Baker	Leigh Francis, Holly Willoughby, Fearne Cotton
The Chase	Quiz show	Potato			2014—present	Stuart McDonald	Bradley Walsh, Shaun Wallace, Mark Labbett, Anne Hegerty
Grantchester	Detective drama	Kudos, Masterpiece	6	39	2014—present	Rob Evans	Robson Green, Tessa Peake-Jones
House of Fools	Comedy	Pett, BBC	2	13	2014—2015	Nick Wood	Bob Mortimer, Vic Reeves, Daniel Simonsen, Morgana Robinson, Matt Berry, Dan Skinner, Reece Shearsmith, Ellie White
Never Mind the Buzzcocks	Comedy panel	Talkback, Talkback Thames	29	281	2014—present	Paul Wheeler	Noel Fielding
Room 101	Comedy	Hat Trick			Ian Lorimer	Frank Skinner	
The Singer Takes It All	Game show	Initial, Remarkable	1	4	2014		Alan Carr
Tumble	Competition		1	6	2014	Phil Heyes	Nadia Comăneci, Louis Smith, Craig Heap, Sebastien Stella
Two Tribes	Game show	Remarkable	3	90	2014—2015	Nigel Saunders	Richard Osman
Virtually Famous	Comedy panel game show	Hungry Bear, Talkback	4	36	2014—2017	Toby Baker	Seann Walsh, Kevin McHale, Chris Stark

=== 2015 ===
==== Film ====
Title	Genre	Company	Director	Starring
The Danish Girl	Biographical romantic drama	Working Title, Artemis Productions, Amber, Revision Pictures, Senator Global Productions, Pretty Pictures	Tom Hooper	Eddie Redmayne, Alicia Vikander, Ben Whishaw, Sebastian Koch
Man Up	Romantic Comedy	Anton Capital, BBC, Big Talk Productions	Ben Palmer	Lake Bell, Simon Pegg
Suffragette	Historical drama	Film4, BFI, Ingenious, Ciné+, Canal+, Ruby, Pathé	Sarah Gavron	Carey Mulligan, Helena Bonham Carter, Brendan Gleeson, Anne-Marie Duff, Ben Whishaw, Meryl Streep

==== Television ====
Title	Genre	Company	Series	Episodes	Years	Main director/s	Starring
The Edge	Game show	BBC Scotland	2	50	2015	Richard van't Riet	Gabby Logan
Humans	Sci-fi	Kudos, AMC	3	24	2015—2018	Lewis Arnold	Katherine Parkinson, Gemma Chan, Lucy Carless, Tom Goodman-Hill, Colin Morgan, Theo Stevenson
The Keith Lemon Sketch Show	Sketch	Talkback	2	12	2015—2016	Jamie Deeks, Dan Johnston, Paul Taylor	Ross Lee, Leigh Francis, Paddy McGuinness
London Spy	Drama	Working Title, BBC, NBCU, BBCA	1	5	2015	Jakob Verbruggen	Ben Whishaw, Jim Broadbent, Edward Holcroft, Samantha Spiro

=== 2016 ===
==== Film ====
Title	Genre	Company	Director	Starring
Allied	War thriller	Huahua Media, GK, ImageMovers	Robert Zemeckis	Brad Pitt, Marion Cotillard
Catherine Tate		Tiger Aspect		Catherine Tate
Grimsby	Action comedy	Columbia, LStar, Village Roadshow, Four by Two, Big Talk, Working Title	Louis Leterrier	Sascha Baron Cohen, Mark Strong, Rebel Wilson, Penélope Cruz, Isla Fisher, Gabourey Sidibe

==== Television ====
Title	Genre	Company	Series	Episodes	Years	Main director/s	Starring
Cash Trapped	Game show	Possessed	3	65	2016—2019	Tim Verrinder	Bradley Walsh
The Crown	Historical Drama	Left Bank, SPT	6	60	2016— 2023	Benjamin Caron, Philip Martin	Claire Foy, Olivia Colman, Imelda Staunton, Matt Smith, Tobias Menzies, Jonathan Pryce, Lesley Manville, Elizabeth Debicki, Dominic West
This Time Next Year	Reality	Twofour	3	18	2016—2019		Davina McCall
Unspun with Matt Forde	Political satire	Avalon	4	27	2016—2018	Peter Orton	Matt Forde

=== 2017 ===
==== Film ====
Title	Genre	Company	Director	Starring
King Arthur: Legend of the Sword	Fantasy action adventure	Warner Bros., Weed Road, Safehouse, Ritchie/Wigram Productions, Village Roadshow	Guy Ritchie	Charlie Hunnam, Àstrid Bergès-Frisbey, Djimon Hounsou, Aidan Gillen, Eric Bana

==== Television ====
Title	Genre	Company	Series	Episodes	Years	Main director/s	Starring
Bigheads	Game show	Primal Media	1	6	2017	Richard van't Riet, Ben Wilson, Lucy Youngman	Jason Manford, Kriss Akabusi, Jenny Powell
CelebAbility	Comedy game show	Potato	5	36	2017—present	Mick Thomas	Iain Stirling, Marek Larwood
The Keith & Paddy Picture Show	Comedy parody	Talkback	2	11	2017—2018	Dan Johnston, Jamie Deeks	Keith Lemon, Paddy McGuinness
Let It Shine	Music competition	BBC	1	10	2017	Simon Staffurth	Gary Barlow, Mel Giedroyc, Martin Kemp, Dannii Minogue, Graham Norton
Love Island: Aftersun	Reality	ITV	5	34	2017—2019	Ben Hardy	Caroline Flack
Not Going Out series 8	Sitcom	Avalon, Arlo			2017	Alex Hardcastle, Nick Wood	Lee Mack, Sally Bretton
The Voice Kids	Competition	ITV, Talpa, Lifted	4	32	2017—present		Danny Jones, Pixie Lott, will.i.am, Emma Willis

=== 2018 ===
==== Film ====
Title	Genre	Company	Director	Starring
Outlaw King	Historical action drama	Sigma Films, Anonymous	David Mackenzie	Chris Pine, Aaron Taylor-Johnson, Florence Pugh, Billy Howle
Peterloo	Historical drama	Film4, BFI, Thin Man	Mike Leigh	Rory Kinnear, Maxine Peake, Pearce Quigley

==== Television ====
Title	Genre	Company	Series	Episodes	Years	Main director/s	Starring
Don't Hate the Playaz	Comedy game show	Monkey Kingdom Productions, ITV	3	21	2018—2020	Chris Howe, Toby Baker	Jordan Stephens, Maya Jama, Lady Leshurr, Shortee Blitz
Jon Richardson: Ultimate Worrier	Comedy panel	Talkback	2	18	2018—2019	Toby Baker	Jon Richardson
The Little Drummer Girl	Drama	BBC, AMC, The Ink Factory, 127 Wall Productions	1	6	2018	Park Chan-wook	Michael Shannon, Alexander Skarsgård, Florence Pugh, Michael Moshonov

=== 2019 ===
==== Film ====
Title	Genre	Company	Director	Starring
The Aeronauts	Semi-biographical adventure	Mandeville, FilmNation	Tom Harper	Eddie Redmayne, Felicity Jones, Himesh Patel, Tom Courtenay

==== Television ====
Title	Genre	Company	Series	Episodes	Years	Main director/s	Starring
Harry Hill's Clubnite	Comedy	Nit Productions, Channel 4	1	6	2019	Geraldine Dowd	Harry Hill

=== 2020 ===
Title	Genre	Company	Series	Episodes	Years	Main director/s	Starring
Beat the Chasers	Game show	Potato, ITV	4	24	2020—present	Mick Thomas	Bradley Walsh, Anne Hegerty, Mark Labbett, Jenny Ryan, Shaun Wallace
The Fantastical Factory of Curious Craft	Competition	Humble Pie Productions, Studio Ramsay, Channel 4	1	6	2020		Keith Lemon, Anna Richardson
Strictly Come Dancing: It Takes Two	Spinoff to Strictly Come Dancing	BBC Studios	21	1102	2020, 2022-2023		Fleur East, Janette Manrara, Joanne Clifton

== See also ==
- Lists of productions shot at the other Elstree studios:
  - List of films and television shows shot at Clarendon Road Studios
  - Gate Studios § Films shot at the studios
  - British and Dominions Imperial Studios § Films shot at Imperial Studios
  - List of films shot at MGM-British Studios, Elstree
  - New Elstree Studios § List of films shot at New Elstree Studios

== Bibliography ==
- Warren, Patricia (1983). Elstree: The British Hollywood. Publisher: Columbus Books, London, ISBN 978-0-86287-446-9.
