= List of South African animated television series =

This is the list of animated television series produced in South Africa.

| Series | Network | Production company | Original run | Refs |
|---|---|---|---|---|
| Jungle Beat | SABC 3 SABC 2 | Sunrise Productions | 2003–present | |
| The Magic Cellar | SABC 2 | Morula Pictures | 2006–2007 | |
| Jozi Zoo | e.tv | Mike Scott Animation | 2003–2004 | |
| URBO: The Adventures of Pax Afrika | SABC 3 | Octagon CSI | 2006–2009 | |
| Supa Strikas | SABC 1 Disney Channel Asia | Strika Entertainment; Animasia Studio | 2008–2015 | |
| Bun&Bunee | SABC 3 | Luma Animation | 2009–2011 | |
| Florrie's Dragons | Disney Junior | Wish Films, Clockwork Zoo, and Studio 100 Animation | 2010–2011 | |
| The Adventures of Noko Mashaba | Soweto TV; Ekhuruleni TV; YouTube | Rams Comics (pty) Ltd. | 2013 | |
| Systraat | SABC 3 on YouTube | Stemmburg Television | 2015 | |
| Silly Seasons | eToonz | N/A | 2015 | |
| Jabu's Jungle | SABC 1 | Gulli Africa | 2017 | |
| Moosebox | Nicktoons and YouTube | Mike Scott Animation and Nickelodeon Animation Studio | 2019 | |
| Mike And Rob | Cartoon Network | Cartoon Network Studios and African Animation Network | 2019 | |
| Munki And Trunk | Nicktoons | Sunrise Productions | 2019 | |
| Kiff | Disney Channel | Walt Disney Animation Television and Titmouse, Inc. | 2023–present | |
| Kiya & the Kimoja Heroes | Disney Junior; Disney+ | Triggerfish Animation Studios, Entertainment One, Frogbox, and TeamTO | 2023–2024 | |
