= BB3B =

- Created by: Will Brenton; Iain Lauchlan; Mike Gordon
- Written by: Dean Woolley; Mark Daydy; Mark Huckerby; Nick Ostler
- Directed by: Chris Fenna
- Starring: Teresa Gallagher; Eve Karpf; Stefan Ashton Frank; Justin Fletcher; Gary Martin; Ashley Slater; Colleen Daley; Regina Reagan; Eric Meyers; Jennifer Wiltsie
- Theme music composer: Bis
- Opening theme: What Are We Gonna Do Now?
- Composers: Andre Jacquemin; Dave Howman; Bis (montage song)
- Country of origin: United Kingdom
- No. of episodes: 13 episodes

Production
- Executive producer: Nikki Chaplin
- Producers: Teresa Read; Will Brenton; Iain Lauchlan
- Editor: Stephen Charles
- Running time: 20 minutes
- Production companies: Tell-Tale Productions; Entertainment Rights PLC; Siriol Productions (Animation)

Original release
- Network: CBBC
- Release: 2004 – 2005

BB3B is a British animated series produced by Tell-Tale Productions in 2004. The entire series consists of thirteen episodes of twenty minutes each. It was shown on CBBC in the UK and ABC Kids in Australia. It first aired in 2004-05.

The series was created by Iain Lauchlan and Will Brenton, who also created and produced Tweenies, Boo!, Fun Song Factory and Jim Jam and Sunny, while the series' characters were designed by children's book illustrator Mike Gordon.

== Plot ==
The series centres on the life of twin children, a brother and sister, Lucy and Louie, and their fears about their new baby brother, Billy Bob. BB3B actually stands for Billy Bob 3rd Baby. The plot generally involves a circumstance where the twins suspect their brother as usual of being an extraterrestrial, and they go on a wild adventure trying to prove it and stop him from launching an invasion.

The twins are babysat by Chubba, a teenage boy with a fondness for pizza. Chubba often goes along with the idea of an alien brother, sometimes very seriously, and at one point he cracks and tells the parents of the twins' plans to build a time machine. The show is set in the fictional American city of Sunnyfield, which is shown as having a central urban area and outer suburban area, the latter being the home of the family portrayed. The twins' grandmother lives in a trailer in the house's front garden.

== Details ==
Each episode begins with the local postman attempting to deliver a piece of mail to the family mailbox. This ends in him being disfigured or attacked somehow by some strange force within the box – for instance, being turned into a fish. He reappears sometimes later in the episode. The first time he appears is followed by the opening credits.

The series is set in the United States, where, according to the show's theme song, the children's grandmother moved from Rochdale, a town in Greater Manchester. She has affections for the man who lives across the street, Mr. Wienburger, and there is a running gag in that his face is never visible; the viewer seeing either just a silhouette or the back of his head.

The Sprogs are baby-like aliens who emit green foul smelling gas. The series never features a real invasion, though it does go across the threshold of science fiction from reality when the postman appears during the episode and at the end the Sprogs always appear to be coming towards the Earth, however, generally, the theories of the twins are disproved.

The song played by Bis is played again during the end credits rather than the opening theme.

== Characters ==
Louie & Lucy

Louie and Lucy are the two eldest children in the Jenkins family and are twins. The twins seem to be about five or six years old and have a fascination with science fiction and fighting aliens. Throughout the show, the twins are seen playing games which, to them, are fighting to defend Earth, but in fact, are not and are really playing like how any child would. They make it their mission throughout the show to try to defeat the evil Sprog aliens who are trying to take over Earth; the Sprog in question being their little brother. When not wearing a costume or going to bed, Lucy wears a yellow shirt with some sort of science fiction planet with spikes coming out of it and a short pink skirt. Louie wears a blue shirt with a picture of a Saturn-like planet with rings around it and blue jeans. They both have brown curly hair. They are voiced by Teresa Gallagher and Colleen Daley.

Billy Bob

Billy Bob is Louie and Lucy's baby brother. Billy Bob is a normal baby, but in Louie and Lucy's eyes they see him as a mind-controlling Sprog alien whose means are to enslave Earth. Billy Bob is simply known as The Sprog or BB3B to the kids, and is called Billy Bob mostly by their mum, but she sometimes also calls him BB3B. Billy Bob is always seen wearing a striped green shirt and nappy.

Jazz & Simon (parents)

Jazz and Simon are Lucy, Louie and Billy Bob's parents, and are often seen tired most of the time, due to having to run around keeping track of three young children and keeping them out of trouble. Jazz does not appear to have a job but is very creative; she is said to be the glue that holds the family together. Simon is an architect whose plans never seem very practical nor work. The kids think that their parents are now zombies controlled by Billy Bob because of their slow mobility due to tiredness. Jazz wears a green long sleeve turtle neck jumper and a purple polka-dot skirt and Simon wears a striped red shirt with brown pants. They are voiced by Regina Reagan and Gary Martin.

Nana

Nana is Simon's mother who lives in a trailer in the front yard of the Jenkins' house. As explained in the lyrics of the show's theme song, she moved from Rochdale, England to America. She makes a point of driving her Mini on the left hand side of the road akin to the British. She is a relatively large woman who has an apparent love for Mr. Wienburger and has gone to extreme measures to get to him. She also has a western set of clothes and loves country music. Voiced by Colleen Daley.

Mr. Wienburger

Mr. Wienburger lives across the road from the Jenkins and is a mysterious man whose face we never see. He appears to have an important job, as most people seem to know him. He is afraid of Nana and constantly hides from her.

Chubba

Chubba is the teenage babysitter of the Jenkins kids. He is about 15 years old, and calls virtually everyone "Dude". His interests are watching science fiction shows and movies (anything on the television for that matter), eating pizza, watching old B movies, listening to punk music and hanging out with the kids. Chubba is a laid-back kind of person and acts strange after long periods of time without TV. He gives the kids information on whatever they ask even if he has no clue. His real name is George, as mentioned in the episode, "BB Phone Home", where he gets a job at NASA. He is voiced by Justin Fletcher.

== Bis ==
The theme song of the series was performed by Scottish rock band Bis. Members Steven Clark (Sci-fi Steven), John Clark (John Disco), and Amanda MacKinnon (Manda Rin), along with their fictional drummer, appear at some point in all except the first episode performing a song relating to the episode's plot (which would be heard again during the closing credits).

They turned up to sing in a variety of strange places during the series' run: On the roof of a toy store; on the back of a truck travelling along the street; on the roof of the Jenkins' home; and even underwater in a large tank at the local aquarium. However, Bis played no part whatsoever in the storylines; they never interacted with the show's characters, and the characters never seemed to see and/or hear them either. Bis was also best known for writing, composing and performing the closing credits theme song to Cartoon Network's The Powerpuff Girls. The songs from the show were later included in their album, "Music for Animations".
