= Tweenies =

British children's television show

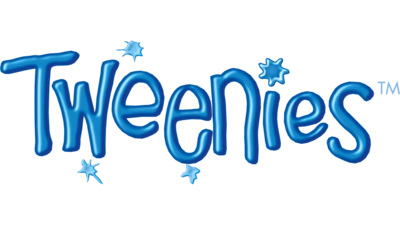
- Created by: Will Brenton; Iain Lauchlan
- Developed by: Tell-Tale Productions
- Starring: Justin Fletcher; Bob Golding; Sally Preisig; Emma Weaver; Colleen Daley; Sinead Rushe; Simon Grover
- Music by: Liz Kitchen; Graham Pike; Barrie Bignold
- Opening theme: "Tweenies Theme (Are you ready to play?)"
- Ending theme: "Tweenies Theme (Are You Ready to Play?)" (instrumental, short version)
- Country of origin: United Kingdom
- Original language: English
- No. of series: 6
- No. of episodes: 390 (list of episodes)

Production
- Executive producers: Judy Whitfield; Clare Elstow
- Producers: Kay Benbow; Tony Reed; Robin Carr; Iain Lauchlan; Will Brenton; Karl Woolley
- Camera setup: Davy Johnson
- Running time: 18–20 minutes
- Production companies: Tell-Tale Productions; BBC Worldwide

Original release
- Network: BBC One
- Release: 6 September 1999 – 24 April 2002

Tweenies is a British live action puppet children's television series created by Will Brenton and Iain Lauchlan, and produced by Tell-Tale Productions for the BBC. The programme was focused on four preschool-aged characters, known as the "Tweenies"; Jake, Fizz, Milo & Bella, whilst playing, singing, dancing and learning in a fictional playgroup in England. They are cared for by two adult Tweenies; Judy & Max and his dog; Doodles, and later another dog, Izzles who belongs to Judy.

Tweenies first premiered on 6 September 1999 on the BBC's children's block and consisted of a total of 390 episodes, with the final production airing in April 2002. Repeated episodes of the series aired on CBeebies from 2002 to 2016. In 2000, the show won a British Academy Television Award for Best Pre-school Live Action Series, and singles featuring exclusive songs spent several weeks in the charts during the early 2000s.

Tweenies also released music in the early 2000s and achieved five top 20 singles on the UK singles chart.

== Overview and history ==
The idea for the programme came from Will Brenton and Iain Lauchlan, a pair with a track record of being involved in children's programming for the BBC. Together they set up Tell-Tale Productions at Elstree Studios in Borehamwood, Hertfordshire, in 1994. Lauchlan was a presenter on Play School, Fingermouse, and Playdays, meeting Brenton, a director, writer and also presenter, during the latter. Together they started producing two of the Playdays strands before forming Tell-Tale Productions (later rebranded as Wish Films). They also created Fun Song Factory, Boo!, BB3B, and Jim Jam and Sunny.

Tweenies is a production of Tell-Tale Productions. Animation for the show was produced by A Productions, an animation studio based in Bristol, England, with Ealing Animation providing some animation in a few early episodes. Computer animation for the series was provided by Clockwork Digital, with Ben Mars animating Mungo, the computer creature who appears in some later episodes.

Episodes consist of a mixture of story, song, and creative activity. Music plays an important part in the programme and children are encouraged to join in with songs and actions.

The programme is set in a nursery in England attended by four puppet characters called The Tweenies: Jake, Fizz, Milo and Bella. They are in the care of two adult helpers, Max and Judy, and their dog, Doodles, later joined by another dog, Izzles.

There was also meant to be a character called Syd/Sid, however he was axed by the BBC before production, leaving the four other Tweenies.

The show includes a "Tweenie Clock", with five circular lights arranged in a pentagonal shape with the lights denoting "News Time" (Circle Time in the US) – Orange, "Messy Time" – Blue, "Song Time" – Yellow, "Telly Time" (Video Time in the US) – Green and "Story Time" – Red. "Surprise Time" is a special time determined when all five lights glow. A button at the centre of the clock (Purple) is pressed to select the activity that will be undertaken next.

It was formerly shown and repeated on CBeebies, from 11 February 2002 until 1 April 2016. Like several other CBeebies programmes, a live stage version of the show has toured in the UK. The final tour, Top of the Tots, toured the UK during 2009 for the series' 10th anniversary. In addition, the tour also played several shows in Hong Kong in late September and early October 2009. The Tweenies were also regulars on the annual CBeebies Live tours around the British Isles. Between 2003 and 2005, there was also a Tweenies theme park, at Alton Towers in the Cred Street section aimed at younger children, which replaced the Barney & Friends section and was then replaced by a Bob the Builder section. In 2000, Tweenies won two awards: Best Pre-School Educational Program and Best Live Action Pre-School Programme.

The original prototypes for the Tweenies characters were designed by Sally Preisig of Mimics Productions; they were later re-scaled into two sizes for the characters shown in the series. In addition, Preisig also designed the character costumes and was co-constructor/developer for the Tweenies' full-size puppets. The costume fabric comes from the UK and was imported and dyed into their present colours; it is about the same thickness as fleece jumpers. Neal Scanlan Studios made the animatronic Tweenie heads.

== Characters ==
=== Main ===
- Milo (operated by C.H. Beck 1999–2000, Matthew Lyons/Kate Ryan 2000–04; voiced by Bob Golding) – A four-year-old purple-skinned boy with black hair. The loudmouth of the Tweenies, he is energetic and loves telling jokes and playing pranks. Sometimes his impulsiveness and hyperactivity may result in him upsetting the other Tweenies, but he is ultimately friendly and good-hearted. He is quick to argue with Bella due to their loud, clashing personalities. He often adds the suffix "-a-rooney" to words. He loves football and magic. His favourite colour is blue. His best friend is Jake.
- Fizz (operated by Jenny Hutchinson 1999–2000, Angela Reynolds 2000, Francesca Anderson 2001–04; voiced by Colleen Daley) – A four-year-old yellow-skinned girl with reddish brown beaded hair. She is usually mild-mannered and laidback but can become stroppy when she doesn't get her way. Fizz is somewhat introverted; when something upsets her, she often retreats to the playhouse for peace. She loves dancing (especially ballet), painting, singing and playing with dolls. Her favourite colour is pink. Her best friend is Bella.
- Bella (operated by Tamsin Heatley, Emma Quintin, Esther Collins; voiced by Sally Preisig 1999–2000, Emma Weaver 2000–04) – A five-year-old blue-skinned girl with blonde hair and a red hair bow. As the oldest and tallest of the Tweenies, Bella has a sense of superiority over her younger friends. She projects a bossy and boisterous attitude and likes to take the role of leadership in the Tweenies' games. Sometimes, she causes things to go wrong with her arrogance – for instance, in the episode 'It Wasn't Me', Bella accidentally breaks one of the strings from Max's marionette puppet despite everyone having been told not to play with it as it was "special", and she hides it in Doodles' bed and tries to blame him. Despite this, she always apologises for her wrongdoings eventually. Although Bella comes across as domineering, she has a caring heart and likes to help the younger Tweenies. She loves acting, dressing up, fairies and reading. Her favourite colour is red. Her best friend is Fizz.
- Jake (operated by Samantha Dodd 1999–2004; voiced by Justin Fletcher) – A three-year-old orange-skinned boy with a yellow mohawk. Being the youngest of the Tweenies, he sometimes feels left out and excluded from the other Tweenies' games when he is not big enough to join in. He is the kindest of the Tweenies and has a close bond with Doodles, often turning to him for comfort or advice when unhappy. He is also very sensitive and is prone to tears when frustrated. He will sometimes get words mixed up. He loves playing pretend, using his imagination, and dressing up, especially as his superhero alter-ego, Dotman. His favourite colour is green. His best friend is Milo.

=== Supporting ===
- Doodles (operated by Alan Riley and John Tobias; voiced by Justin Fletcher) – A red-and-yellow male dog. Doodles is very friendly, relaxed and calm. His favourite colour is yellow. His voice is based on that of Scooby-Doo. He loves going for walks with Max and can often be seen looking out for Jake.
- Max (operated by Simon Grover/Matthew Lyons (some episodes); voiced by Bob Golding) – A pink-skinned man who is one of the two managers of the playgroup of the Tweenies. He speaks with a Yorkshire accent. He loves animals, trains, fixing different things around the playgroup, and exploring the outside world. He is the oldest member of the group.
- Judy (operated by Simon Grover/Sinead Rushe (outside); voiced by Sinead Rushe) – A green-skinned woman who is the other of the playgroup managers. She speaks with a Northern Irish accent; in the episode "Wedding Party", she returns to her native Ireland to attend a wedding. She loves reading, gardening, being creative and giving good advice to the Tweenies.
- Izzles (operated by Fiona Watkins; voiced by Colleen Daley) – A purple-and-white female dog, who was first introduced in 2001. Unlike Doodles, she is a puppy and therefore much younger and very energetic. Her favourite colour is purple. At first, her antics were not to the Tweenies' liking, more so Jake but she later calms down and settles in. The girls often like to dress her up in fancy accessories. She is also a companion for Doodles. She was originally going to be called Squiggles until it was realised that someone already had the rights to that name and that small children find it hard to say 'SQU'.

== Episodes ==
Series	Episodes	Originally released	
Series	Episodes	First released	Last released
1	85	6 September 1999	31 December 1999
2	45	31 January 2000	31 March 2000
3	30	24 July 2000	1 September 2000
4	40	9 October 2000	1 December 2000
5	60 + Special	18 December 2000	9 April 2001
6	130	24 September 2001	24 April 2002

The Tweenies aired its first episode Tweenie Band on 6 September 1999 on its original programme block CBBC and last aired on 24 April 2002 with What Makes Summer? on its former channel CBeebies. In total, there are 390 episodes. There have been special episodes, such as a series of Be Safe with the Tweenies and expanded forty-minute episodes.

Episode 252, Favourite Songs (first aired in March 2001) was withdrawn from further airing in January 2013, after the BBC received 216 complaints about a scene within the episode, themed as a parody of an episode of Top of the Pops where Max appears dressed as disgraced host Jimmy Savile, and even uses some of his catchphrases. The episode aired three months after claims of sexual abuse committed by Savile came to light. The BBC removed Tweenies from the CBeebies schedule altogether for four months. The episodes then came back to the schedule from June 2013 until April 2016.

== Worldwide success ==
From the show's debut in 1999, the series enjoyed international success in France, Spain, Italy, Canada, Singapore and Australia.

In the U.S., Tweenies originally aired on Nickelodeon's Nick Jr. block from 7 April to 25 September 2003. It was repeated on Noggin from 2003 to 2005.

== Discography ==
=== Albums ===
Title	Entered chart (UK)	Peak position (UK)	Weeks on chart (UK)
Friends Forever	25 November 2000	56	6
The Christmas Album	1 December 2001	34	6
Everybody Dance	23 November 2002	83	1
Greatest Hits (double CD)	—	—	—

=== Singles ===
Title	Entered chart (UK)	Peak position (UK)	Weeks on chart (UK)	Sent to CBeebies Album
"No. 1"	11 November 2000	5	24	Yes
"Best Friends Forever"	31 March 2001	12	11	Yes
"Do the Lollipop"	4 August 2001	17	8	No
"I Believe in Christmas"	15 December 2001	9	6	No
"Have Fun, Go Mad"	14 September 2002	20	8	Yes

== Live shows ==
The Tweenies have had huge success in live performances from when they first premiered to the mid-2000s.

=== Television ===
In November 2000, the Tweenies appeared on a few episodes of the show Top of the Pops, performing their single No. 1.

In December 2000, the Tweenies starred in their dedicated special of the series which featured more of their singles like Do The Lollipop and Have Fun Go Mad!. This episode was later released on VHS and DVD as Music is Pop-a-Rooney! in July 2002, with new wrap-around segments recorded in the Playgroup.

=== Arena tours ===
Beginning in 2001, the first Tweenies Live! show went on tour around arenas around the United Kingdom, produced by Tell-Tale Productions and BBC Worldwide, the show featured the Tweenies singing their favourite songs. A live recording of this tour from the London Arena was released on VHS in July 2001. A follow-up show – Tweenies Live! 2: The Fab-a-Rooney Tour, toured from February–July 2002 and featured the live debut of Izzles.

In December 2001, a follow-up show titled Tweenies Live! The Christmas Present was presented at the Royal Albert Hall for the Christmas period and was later given a wide arena tour from December 2003 to January 2004, where Izzles joined the cast. A recording of the 2001 version was released on VHS in November 2002 and was later released on DVD in November 2006 as part of the Tweenies: The Ultimate Christmas Collection DVD compilation.

The fourth tour – No Sleep 'til Bedtime, toured the UK from March to May 2005. This tour was notable for featuring covers of licensed tracks sung by the Tweenies.

The fifth tour – The Enchanted Toyshop toured the UK in the Spring and Summer of 2007. It was the first Tweenies live tour to be solely produced by BBC Worldwide and the first to be shown in theatres instead of arenas.

The most recent tour – Top of the Tots, toured the UK in Early 2009 to celebrate the show's 10th Anniversary.

=== Alton Towers ===
From 2003 to 2005, the Cred Street Theatre was renamed The Tweenies Theatre where the characters spent three seasons performing live shows daily. There was also a Tweenies themed playground area.

== Merchandise ==
=== DVDs and videos ===
A variety of Tweenies episodes were released on VHS and DVD from 1999 up to 2008, featuring themed compilations and special episodes. These were released by BBC Video (latterly through BBC Children's DVD). Some notable releases include Ready to Play with the Tweenies (1999), Animal Friends (2000), Colours Are Magic (2001), It's Messy Time (2002), Night-Time Magic (2003), Jungle Adventure (2004), Fizz (2005), The Ultimate Christmas Collection (2006), Practical Jokes And Other Stories (2007) and Messy Time Magic (2008).

Many of the home releases were dubbed into other languages and released abroad. In addition, several of the Tweenies videos were produced in special versions for retailers with additional footage (for example, the "Party Games, Laughs & Giggles" video distributed at Marks & Spencer stores carried two additional segments, adding ten minutes to the video's running time). Many of the above videos were also released on DVD under different names. In 2010, iTunes released a Best of Tweenies Volume 1 which consisted of the first six episodes of the first series. All of the Tweenies music releases were made available in retailers via cassette and CD.

=== Additional products ===
From the show's debut in 1999 to 2008, a range of Tweenies storybooks were published, primarily based on aired episodes. Additional merchandise included soft toys, playsets, collectible figures, bedding, board games, puzzles, clothing, talking toys and yearly hardback annuals released between 2001 and 2006. Several computer and video games were also produced, including Tweenies: Doodles' Bones for Game Boy Color and Tweenies: Game Time for PlayStation, along with many other related products.

=== Game Time ===
Tweenies: Game Time

Reception

Review score
Publication	Score
PlayStation: The Official Magazine	1/10

Tweenies: Game Time (also known as Play With The Tweenies) is an educational kids video game released in Europe on 30 March 2001 for PlayStation, published by BBC Multimedia. It takes the form of a minigame collection. The player controls Milo, Jake, Fizz and Bella through a series of 4 scenarios inspired by the show, one for each character.

The game was developed by Intelligent Games. The direction of the game was partially based on research by BBC Worldwide of children who watched the Television show, which found that "singing and dancing are major factors in the success of the show". according to a BBC article from before the game launched.

== Awards and nominations ==
Year	Nominated works	Award	Category	Result	Lost to
2000	Tweenies	BAFTA Children's Awards	"Best Pre-School Live Action"	Won	—N/a
2002	Tweenies	BAFTA Children's Awards	"Best Pre-School Live Action"	Nominated	Teletubbies
