= Boo! (TV series) =

British children's television series

- Created by: Will Brenton; Iain Lauchlan; Rebecca Elgar (characters)
- Directed by: Mark Taylor
- Voices of: Ashley Slater; Sharon D. Clarke; Justin Fletcher; Kate Harbour
- Opening theme: "Where's Boo? (Can You Find Boo?)"
- Ending theme: "Where's Boo? (Can You Find Boo?)"
- Country of origin: United Kingdom
- Original language: English
- No. of series: 2
- No. of episodes: 104 (alongside a double-length Christmas special)

Production
- Producer: Teresa Reed
- Running time: 11 minutes 22 minutes (Log Cabin/Santa's House)
- Production company: Tell-Tale Productions (Note: Animation outsourced to A Productions.)

Original release
- Network: CBeebies
- Release: 4 June 2003 – 29 December 2006

Boo! is a British pre-school 3D-animated children's television series created by Will Brenton and Iain Lauchlan, and produced through their company Tell-Tale Productions for CBeebies with Universal Pictures handling co-funding and worldwide television distribution, home video and consumer product rights. The series aired for a total of 104 episodes and one Christmas special; it was nominated for the British Academy Children's Award for Pre-School Animation in 2003.

== Synopsis ==
The series centres on the titular character, Boo, who plays a game entitled "Boo!", which is similar to Hide-and-seek. He plays with his friends in a variety of settings and locations. The commentary is performed by adult male and female narrators and a crowd of children.

During the game, three key objects and Boo's friends are located. After Boo is found three times, the children go over the key objects that were found. Boo and his friends come together, then a song is sung, usually about matching characters or objects to their shapes or colours. Following the song, Boo's friends notice he's hiding again and the episode ends.

The visual style of Boo! is very distinctive, using 3D computer-generated imagery with rounded shapes and cel shading. The music and songs are generally in an early-1970s funk or R&B style.

== Characters ==
- Boo – a pear/aubergine-shaped patchwork creature with orange spiky hair. His feet are red with white spots on them. The main goal of the programme is to find Boo in his various hiding places. Half-way through each episode, Boo magically adopts attributes of his surroundings (e.g. becomes "Penguin Boo" in the Antarctic or "Pumpkin Boo" on Halloween). Boo cannot talk, although he communicates by whistling at the beginning of each episode.
- Laughing Duck (voiced by Kate Harbour) – a yellow duck, who laughs when "found". She has a red-orange bill that matches her legs and has abilities to fly and swim. In some episodes, she meets some people who happen to be employees. In the hospital, she has been found sad because her laugh is lost, but it is regained when Boo tickles her flipper and made her laugh.
- Sleeping Bear (voiced by Justin Fletcher) a brown bear who is usually asleep, yawning or stretching when "found". His blanket is red with a print of white hearts on it. The catchphrase associated with him is "Shhh... Tippy-toe, tippy-toe." In some episodes, he finds a spot to sleep around anything that is cozy. In the police station, he was lost in the park until his friends had found him sleeping and sitting on the swing set.
- Growling Tiger (voiced by Justin Fletcher) - a friendly tiger with fluffy white ears. Despite his name, he says "Roar!" (not "Growl!") when "found". His associated catchphrase is "It's Growling Tiger! Run away! Run away!"

Other characters, both human and animal vary from one episode to another. The people who have speaking roles in this show are the artists, Chatty Hairdresser, Helpful Nurse, Caring Doctor, Helpful Teacher (an ice skater), Helpful Waitress, Happy Customers (one man and one woman), Busy Chef, the woman on high stilts, the ringmaster, Careful Grownup, Smiling Santa, Graceful Teacher (a ballet dancer), Friendly Police Officers, Strong Lumberjack, Gentle Vet, Show Singers, Shouting Stallholder and Cheering Dad. The Blue Squawking Parakeet (actually a cockatoo with a red crest) appears in a birdcage (being taken home by a customer) in the episode 'Veterinarian'.

== Episodes ==
=== Series 1 (2003-2004) ===
- 1. Rockpool (Show Us A Shape) - 4 June 2003

(Waving Sea Anemone, Stretching Starfish, and Creeping Crab)

- 2. Supermarket (The Counting Song) - 11 June 2003

(Waving Girl, Smiling Lady, and Checkout Man)

- 3. Pond (Show Us A Shape) - 18 June 2003

(Jumping Frog, Amazing Pond Skater, and Hovering Dragonflies)

- 4. Art Gallery (We're Looking for a Colour) - 25 June 2003

(Smiling Portrait, Pretty Finger-Painting, and Swirly Painting)

- 5. Desert (Show Us A Shape) - 2 July 2003

(Chewing Camel, Skipping Rat, and Lazy Lizard)

- 6. Harbour (The Counting Song) - 9 July 2003

(Chugging Fishing Boat, Speedy Speedboat, and Slow Rowing Boat)

- 7. Bedroom (Show Us A Shape) - 16 July 2003

(Sausage Dog, Cozy Cat, and Comfy Bunny Slippers)

- 8. Prehistoric Land (We're Looking for a Colour) - 23 July 2003

(Stamping Diplodocus, Flapping Pterodactyl, and Scuttling Scutellosaurus)

- 9. Theatre (Do the Same as Me) - 30 July 2003

(Musical Orchestra, Tapping Dancers and Show Singers)

- 10. African River (Show Us A Shape) - 6 August 2003

(Flying Flamingo, Snapping Crocodile, and Yawning Hippo)

- 11. Cave (Do the Same as Me) - 13 August 2003

(Crawling Toad, Scuttling Spider, and Flapping Bat)

- 12. Coral Reef (Show Us A Shape) - 20 August 2003

(Hiding Clownfish, Wobbling Jellyfish, and Gliding Lionfish)

- 13. Train Station (The Counting Song) - 27 August 2003

(Talking Ticket Seller, Clever Train Driver, and Waving Guard)

- 14. Canadian River (Odd One Out) - 4 September 2003

(Gnawing Beaver, Fishing Bear, and Bending Heron)

- 15. Indian Jungle (Do the Same as Me) - 11 September 2003

(Bathing Elephant, Swaying Cobra, and Prowling Tiger)

- 16. Café (The Counting Song) - 18 September 2003

(Busy Chef, Friendly Waitress, and Happy Customer)

- 17. Deep Blue Sea (Show Us A Shape) - 25 September 2003

(Leaping Dolphin, Speedy Shark, and Flapping Manta Ray)

- 18. Castle (The Counting Song) - 1 October 2003

(Brave Knight, Busy Servant, and Dancing Queen)

- 19. African Waterhole (Show Us A Shape) - 7 October 2003

(Tall Giraffe, Stripy Zebra, and Enormous Elephant)

- 20. Kitchen (The Counting Song) - 14 October 2003

(Handy Oven Glove, Chilly Fridge, and Drying Tea Towel)

- 21. Arctic (The Counting Song) - 21 October 2003

(Big Polar Bear, Wrinkly Walrus, and Furry Arctic Fox)

- 22. Fun Fair (Do the Same as Me) - 28 October 2003

(Turning Teacup, Bumping Bumper Car, and Golden Horse)

- 23. Space (Odd One Out) - 4 November 2003

(Gigantic Planet, Twinkling Star, and Smiling Moon)

- 24. Garden (Show Us A Shape) - 11 November 2003

(Scampering Squirrel, Wriggling Worm, and Fluttering Butterflies)

- 25. Hospital (Odd One Out) - 18 November 2003

(Poorly Patient, Helpful Nurse, and Caring Doctor)

- 26. Woods at Night (Show Us A Shape) - 25 November 2003

(Fluttering Moth, Snuffling Badger, and Hooting Owl)

- 27. Library (The Counting Song) - 5 February 2004

(Noisy Book, Pop-Up Book, and Talking Book)

- 28. Canadian Mountain (Odd One Out) - 12 February 2004

(Creeping Cougar, Munching Moose, and Climbing Bighorn Sheep)

- 29. Australian Bush (Show Us A Shape) - 19 February 2004

(Laughing Kookaburra, Climbing Koala, and Jumping Kangaroo)

- 30. Swimming Pool (Odd One Out) - 26 February 2004

(Floating Crocodile, Spouting Whale, and Sliding Snake)

- 31. Forest Floor (Do the Same as Me) - 5 March 2004

(Hurrying Centipede, Slimy Slug, and Flying Ladybird)

- 32. Circus (Odd One Out) - 12 March 2004

(Balancing Ballerina, Amazing Acrobat, and Juggling Clown)

- 33. Swamp (Odd One Out) - 19 March 2004

(Hiding Turtle, Smiling Crocodile, and Climbing Raccoon)

- 34. Fun House (Show Us A Shape) - 26 March 2004

(Disappearing Armchair, Laughing Picture, and Funny Ghost)

- 35. Playgroup (Odd One Out) - 2 April 2004

(Happy Girl, Busy Playleader, and Helpful Dad)

- 36. Antarctic (The Counting Song) - 9 April 2004

(Sliding Penguin, Enormous Whale, and Swimming Seal)

- 37. Ski Resort (Odd One Out) - 16 April 2004

(Careful Skier, Jumping Skier, and Racing Skier)

- 38. Jungle (Everybody Do This Sound) - 23 April 2004

(Chattering Monkey, Hissing Snake, and Squawking Parakeets)

- 39. Farm (Everybody Do This Sound) - 30 April 2004

(Mooing Cow, Baaing Sheep, and Clucking Chicken)

- 40. Bathroom (Odd One Out) - 13 May 2004

(Careful Grownup, Soapy Sponge, and Brushing Toothbrush)

- 41. Park (Do the Same as Me)- 20 May 2004

(Hopping Sparrow, Waddling Duck, and Strutting Pigeon)

- 42. Zoo (Everybody Do This Sound) - 27 May 2004

(Trumpeting Elephant, Chattering Chimp, and Roaring Lion)

- 43. English Riverbank (The Counting Song) - 4 June 2004

(Plopping Water Vole, Sliding Otter, Gliding Swans)

- 44. American Ranch (Everybody Do This Sound) - 11 June 2004

(Neighing Horse, Mooing Cow, and Lassoing Cowboy)

- 45. Bamboo Forest (We're Looking for a Colour) - 18 June 2004

(Golden Monkey, Red Panda, and Giant Panda)

- 46. American Prairie (Everybody Do This Sound) - 25 June 2004

(Grunting Bison, Rattling Rattlesnake, and Barking Prairie Dog)

- 47. Junior Gym (We're Looking for a Colour) - 2 July 2004

(Climbing Girl, Jumping Boy, and Crawling Baby)

- 48. Meadow (Do the Same as Me) - 9 July 2004

(Buzzing Bumblebee, Twitching Mouse, and Hopping Grasshopper)

- 49. Tropical Island (We're Looking for a Colour) - 16 July 2004

(Laughing Hornbill, Swinging Orangutan, and Emerald Lizard)

- 50. City at Night (Everybody Do This Sound) - 23 July 2004

(Hungry Fox, Spiky Hedgehog, and Cool Cat)

- 51. Pirate Ship (Do the Same as Me) - 30 July 2004

(Busy Pirates, Bossy Captain, and Talking Parrot)

- 52. City Farm (We're Looking for a Colour) - 6 August 2004

(Hungry Goat, Gentle Pony, and Hopping Rabbit)

=== Christmas Special (2004) ===
- Log Cabin/Santa's House (We're Looking for a Colour, Twinkle, Twinkle Little Star & The Counting Song) - 2004 (Double-Length Episode)

(Twinkling Tree, Pretty Present, Hanging Stocking, Gentle Reindeer, Busy Elves, and Smiling Santa)

=== Series 2 (2005-2006) ===
- 53. Fire Station (The Counting Song) - 28 February 2005

(Brave Firefighter, Noisy Fire Engine, and Long Ladder)

- 54. Dentist (Odd One Out) - 7 March 2005

(Waiting Girl, Friendly Dentist, and Special Chair)

- 55. The Pyramids (We're Looking for a Colour) - 14 March 2005
- 56. Athletics Track (What's Missing) - 21 March 2005

(Jumping Jumper, Throwing Disc Thrower, and Running Runners)

- 57. Airfield (What's Missing) - 28 March 2005

(Flying Plane, Hovering Helicopter and Clever Pilot)

- 58. Kite Festival (Snap) - 4 April 2005

(Bird Kite, Fish Kite and Dragon Kite)

- 59. Ballet Class (Snap) - 11 April 2005

(Graceful Teacher, Ballet Dancer, and Jolly Pianist)

- 60. Veterinarian (The Counting Song) - 18 April 2005

(Hopping Rabbits, Dotty Dog, and Gentle Vet)

- 61. Car Factory (We're Looking For a Colour) - 25 April 2005

(Cheerful Checker, Fast Fitter, and Spraying Robots)

- 62. Pottery (Odd One Out) - 2 May 2005

(Turning Wheel, Jolly Potter, and Stripy Pot)

- 63. Carpenter's Workshop (What's Missing) - 9 May 2005

(Careful Carpenter, Scratching Saw, and Tapping Hammer)

- 64. Sports Day (Can You Guess?) - 16 May 2005

(Balancing Boy, Whistling Teacher, and Cheerful Dad)

- 65. Cheese Market (Snap) - 23 May 2005

(Yellow Cheese, Cheese Porter, and Long Barrow)

- 66. Tennis Court (Can You Guess?) - 30 May 2005

(Tennis Player, Tennis Racquet and Tennis Coach)

- 67. Post Office (Odd One Out) - 6 June 2005

(Cheerful Postie, Silver Sack, and Picture Postcard)

- 68. Diwali Party (The Counting Song) - 13 June 2005

(Beautiful Rangoli Pattern, Twinkling Divas, and Dancing Shadow Puppet)

- 69. Fishing Dock (Odd One Out) - 20 June 2005

(Hardworking Fisherman, Screeching Seagulls, and Bobbing Boat)

- 70. Fancy Dress Shop (We're Looking for a Colour) - 27 June 2005

(Laughing Customer, Silly Assistant, and Fancy Dressmaker)

- 71. Garden Centre (We're Looking for a Colour) - 4 July 2005

(Digging Gardener, Gigantic Goldfish, and Nodding Gnome)

- 72. Police Station (Snap) - 11 July 2005

(Friendly Police Officer, Shiny Police Car, and Noisy Police Radio)

- 73. Pop Concert (The Counting Song) - 18 July 2005

(Cool Guitarist, Dazzling Drummer, and Jazzy Keyboard Player)

- 74. Chinese Garden (The Counting Song) - 25 July 2005

(Dipping Crane, Fantastic Fish, and Mandarin Duck)

- 75. Tea Plantation (What's Missing) - 3 August 2005

(Tea Plants, Tea Picker and Tea Taster)

- 76. Basketball Court (Snap) - 10 August 2005

(Bouncing Ball, High Hoop, and Leaping Player)

- 77. Hairdressers (We're Looking for a Colour) - 17 August 2005

(Wriggling Boy, Chatting Hairdresser, and Busy Assistant)

- 78. Ice Rink (Odd One Out) - 24 August 2005

(Graceful Skater, Wobbly Beginner, and Helpful Teacher)

- 79. Bus Station (What's Missing) - 16 February 2006
- 80. Chicken Farm (Can You Guess?) - 23 February 2006

(Clucking Hen, Cheeping Chicks, Crowing Cockerel)

- 81. Street Market (We're Looking for a Colour) - 2 March 2006

(Funny Juggler, Shouting Stallholder, and Strumming Street Entertainer)

- 82. Bakery (Snap) - 9 March 2006

(Stretchy Dough, Crusty Loaf, and Busy Baker)

- 83. Building Site (We're Looking for a Colour) - 16 March 2006

(Orange Digger, Expert Builder, and Perfect Painter)

- 84. Baseball Ground (What's Missing) - 23 March 2006

(Crouching Catcher, Swinging Batter, and Posing Pitcher)

- 85. Birthday Party (We're Looking for a Colour) - 30 March 2006

(Giggling Guest, Birthday Boy, and Clever Magician)

- 86. Football Match (What's Missing) - 6 April 2006

(Fast Footballer, Whistling Referee, and Jumping Goalie)

- 87. Surfer Beach (Odd One Out) - 13 April 2006
- 88. Race Track (The Counting Song) - 20 April 2006

(Quick Mechanic, Chequered Flag, and Racing Driver)

- 89. Roman Villa (The Counting Song) - 27 April 2006

(Beautiful Mosaic, Marble Statue, and Pretty Pots)

- 90. Orange Grove (What's Missing) - 16 May 2006
- 91. Venetian Canal (What's Missing) - 23 May 2006
- 92. Children's Play (Can You Guess?) - 30 May 2006

(Silly Simon, Sweet Daisy, and Happy Jack)

- 93. Crazy Golf Course (Odd One Out) - 6 June 2006

(Steep Steps, Zigzag Clown, and Helter Skelter)

- 94. Timber Forest (Snap) - 13 June 2006

(Tall Tree, Strong Lumberjack, and Careful Forrester)

- 95. Lei Day (Can You Guess?) - 20 June 2006

(Beautiful Lei Queen, Ukulele Player, and Hula Dancer)

- 96. House Being Decorated (Snap) - 27 June 2006

(Curly Wallpaper, Big Paste Brush, and Expert Decorator)

- 97. Seaside (The Counting Song) - 3 July 2006

(Bouncy Beach Ball, Shiny Shells, and Slippery Seaweed)

- 98. Halloween (Can You Guess?) - 30 October 2006

(Smiley Pumpkin Lantern, Giggling Ghost, and Rolling Robot)

- 99. Campsite (Can You Guess?) 10 July 2006

(Happy Camper, Campervan, and Tiny Tent)

- 100. Film Set (What's Missing) - 7 September 2006

(Smart Actor, Helpful Director, and Camera Operator)

- 101. Snowy Garden (Can You Guess?) - 8 December 2006

(Red Robin, Rolling Snowball, and Smiling Snowman)

- 102. Rain Forest Canopy (We're Looking for a Colour) - 23 December 2006

(Blue Bird of Paradise, Yellow Bird of Paradise, and Red Bird of Paradise)

- 103. Galapagos Islands (Snap) - 25 December 2006

(Giant Tortoise, Still Sea Iguana, and Dancing Booby Bird)

- 104. Chinese New Year (We're Looking for a Colour) - 29 December 2006

== Development, Songs and Broadcast ==
=== Development ===
The show was created by Will Brenton and Iain Lauchlan, who have created and produced Fun Song Factory, BB3B, and Jim Jam and Sunny in addition to Tweenies. Brenton also designed the characters.

On July 26, 2002, the BBC picked up the UK broadcasting rights to Boo! for a broadcast in September 2003. On September 1, it was announced that Universal Pictures had acquired worldwide distribution, home video and consumer product rights to the series in exchange for providing co-funding.

On May 22, 2003, the show was announced to premiere on June 4 on the CBeebies on BBC Two block.

On April 7, 2004, Boo! was renewed for a second series.

=== Broadcast ===
"Boo!" could be seen in the United Kingdom on CBeebies (formerly on CBeebies on BBC Two), reruns from 2007-2012 in the United States on the digital channel Qubo (with two episodes in a half-hour format), Discovery Kids in Latin America, Australia's ABC, and TVOKids in Canada, alongside Hop! in Israel, and Baraem in Qatar.

=== Songs ===
"Where’s Boo? (Can You Find Boo?)" "Show Us a Shape" "The Counting Song" "We’re Looking for a Colour" "Do the Same As Me" "Odd One Out" "Everybody Do This Sound" "What’s Missing?" "Snap!" "Can You Guess?" and "Twinkle, Twinkle Little Star"

== Home media ==
VHS, DVD and VCD releases of the series were handled by Universal Pictures Video in all regions.

Name	Episodes	Release date	Special Features	Extra information
Faraway Places	"Australian Bush" "Jungle" "Desert" "Prehistoric Land" "Coral Reef" "African River"	May 24, 2004 (United Kingdom); Late-2004 (Australia); September 6, 2005 (France); December 7, 2005 (Sweden); 2006 (Turkey)	Disc 1 "Mix'n Match" game "Do The Same As Me" song "Space" (Bonus episode); Disc 2 "Bamboo Forest" (Bonus episode) "American Prairie" (Bonus episode) "Indian Jungle" (Bonus episode)	(Note: Known as Boo! Volume 1 in Brazil, Boo! Lugares Lejanos in Mexico, Boo! Découvre le Monde in France, Bu! På Upptäcksfärd in Sweden, and Boo! Haydi Saklanalım in Turkey.)Non-UK releases do not have the second tape/disc. The Nordic and VCD releases have no special features.
Country Adventures	"Meadow" "Pond" "Canadian River" "Forest Floor" "Mountain"; Cave"	March 14, 2005 (United Kingdom); 2005 (Australia); 2006 (Turkey)	"Mix'n Match" game "We’re Looking for a Colour" song "Castle" (Bonus episode)	(Note: Known as Boo! Volume 2 in Brazil, and Boo! Haydi Boo`yu Bulalım in Turkey.)The Turkish VCD release has no bonus features.
Merry Christmas	"Christmas Special" "Antarctic" "Ski Resort" "Arctic" "City at Night"	2005 (Asian territories)	"Mix'n Match" game "The Counting Song" song "Snowy Garden" (Bonus episode)	Was originally planned for an October 11, 2004 release in the United Kingdom, but was not released. Only released in Asian territories on VCD.
