= Animation industry in South Africa =

The Animation Industry in South Africa encompasses traditional 2D animation, 3D animation and visual effects for feature films.

== History ==
In 1915, Harold M. Shaw first created his first animated film called An Artist's Dream. It tells a tale about a protagonist who is an artist whose drawings come to life. The film is a blend of animation and live action, which experiments with early 20th-century film techniques. Winsor McCay animation style was a big influence behind this project. In 1917, for additional animated shorts, The Adventures of Ranger Focus, Don’t You Believe, Crooks and Christmas, and The Adventures of Ben Cockles were released. Each of these shorts were directed by Norman H. Lee.

== Awards and festivals ==
Awards and conventions for the South African animation industry include:

- The Durban International Film Festival for Best South African Feature Film
- South African Film and Television Awards for Best Animation
- Cape Town International Animation Festival
- Africa Movie Academy Award for Best Animation
- Anima Mundi for Best Children's Feature
- Gold Panda Award for Best Foreign Animation
- Zanzibar International Film Festival for best animation
- South African Film and Television Awards for Best music composition for a feature film
- Gold Panda Award for Grand Prize
- Annecy Animation Festival for Best Animation
- My Better World Award for Kids: Factual & Entertainment category [International Emmy Award]
- The Snail and the Whale for best special production [International Animated film Association]

== Industry ==
South Africa's animation industry consists of 29 production companies with its major studios including Triggerfish Studios, Clockwork Zoo Animation, Morula Pictures (South Africa's largest Black-led animation studio), and Sunrise Productions. South Africa's animation sector consists of private companies using animation techniques for advertising, websites, architecture, etc. South Africa's animation studios don't have the funding for traditional animation, their market was too small to make it viable. This market still has a skills deficit and little to no government funding. However South African animators have won multiple international awards in animation character creation and visual effects.

== Market ==
Cape Town, Port Elizabeth, Plettenberg Bay, Johannesburg and Durban have several major animation studios in the country. Department of Trade and Industry (DTI) values its animation sector at R464 million in the film industry and box office, WESGRO values it in the international market at the cost of R365 million in a cinematic budget, Visit website. The Media, Information and Communication Technologies Sector Education and Training Authority (MICT SETA) encourages skills for young animators to boost South Africa's Socio-economic sector, also the small companies. The largest producer and exporter of animation is the Western world. It produces and exports animation for an estimate of US$145.4 million per year, and South Africa can produce for US$13,0 million per year due to its straining economy and lack of resources.

== List of South African animated films ==
One of the first animated films released in 1916 was An Artist's Dream, many of its films being released in South Africa.

== List of South African animated television and online series ==
Post-apartheid, like animated television shows and online series, have allowed Black artist help define a new national identity. This includes early 2000's tv series URBO: The Adventures of Pax Africa (2006-2009) and The Adventures of Noko Mashaba.

== See also ==
- Animation industry
