= Entertainment Rights =

Defunct British multinational mass media and entertainment conglomerate

Entertainment Rights PLC
- Formerly: Sleepy Kids PLC (1989–1998); SKD Media PLC (1998–1999)
- Type: Public
- Industry: Television production Global media company
- Genre: Entertainment; Children's programming
- Founded: 11 July 1989; 37 years ago
- Founder: Martin Powell; Vivien Schrager-Powell
- Defunct: 8 May 2009; 17 years ago 30 December 2010; 15 years ago (company dissolved)
- Fate: Administration; Acquired by Boomerang Media and folded into Classic Media
- Successor: DreamWorks Classics (DreamWorks Animation)
- Headquarters: London, United Kingdom
- Area served: Worldwide
- Products: Children's television series; Children's films
- Services: Distribution; Licensing
- Number of employees: 188+
- Divisions: Right Entertainment; Right Records; Tell-Tale Productions
- Subsidiaries: Classic Media

Entertainment Rights PLC (formerly known as Sleepy Kids PLC and SKD Media PLC) was a British multinational mass media and entertainment conglomerate that specialised in television shows and cartoons, children's media, films, and distribution. In May 2009, the company was acquired by Boomerang Media and merged into its own subsidiary Classic Media.

== History ==
=== Early history ===
"Sleepy Kids" was founded by Martin and Vivien Schrager-Powell in 1989. It was created in order to produce Midnight Patrol: Adventures in the Dream Zone (Potsworth and Co. in the United Kingdom), a children's animated series. Schrager-Powell's business partner was U.S. animation studio Hanna-Barbera. Within months of its founding, Sleepy Kids became a public company. It produced Dr. Zitbag's Transylvania Pet Shop and Budgie the Little Helicopter.

In December 1998, the company merged with The Richard Digance Card Company, Clipper Films and Ridgeway Films, and after these mergers, the company was renamed SKD Media PLC.

In 1999, the company acquired Cardiff-based animation studio Siriol Productions, best known for producing SuperTed. In July, SKD purchased the Southampton-based Boom! Boom!, the property owners of the Basil Brush character.

=== Rebranding and expansion as Entertainment Rights ===
In October 1999, SKD Media announced that they would acquire fellow independent business Carrington Productions International. One month later in November of that same year following SKD Media's acquisition of Carrington Productions International, SKD announced to change their name to Entertainment Rights.

Under their new name, Entertainment Rights continued their expansion. Their first acquisition after the name change came in April, with the worldwide pre-sale rights to the then-upcoming GMTV series Cubeez. In August, the company signed a co-production deal with Disney-owned Buena Vista Home Entertainment for their Magical Mystical Merlin series, later renamed Merlin the Magical Puppy, where BVHE would distribute the series on home media worldwide except in the U.S. and Japan.

In February 2001, the company acquired all international TV and home video rights to Barbie in the Nutcracker from the American toy company Mattel, which was set for a Winter 2001 release. In March 2001, Entertainment Rights announced it had purchased United Kingdom-based children's distribution company Link Entertainment, which also included its licensing subsidiary Link Licensing (who previously partnered with American toy company Mattel on the Barbie licence for the UK) with Link Entertainment co-founder and managing director Claire Derry will join Entertainment Rights's board of directors. Another purchase came in November of that year, when Entertainment Rights acquired privately held stop-motion animation studio Woodland Animations, best known for producing Postman Pat, along with Gran, Bertha and Charlie Chalk. The acquisition of stop-motion animation studio Woodland Animations gained Entertainment Rights the distribution rights to Woodland's productions worldwide alongside the production of an upcoming revival of Postman Pat.

Following the success of Barbie in the Nutcracker, Entertainment Rights had expanded its partnership with American toy company Mattel when the two agreed to a worldwide deal to distribute the second movie - Barbie as Rapunzel, in April 2002, excluding the U.S.

In March 2004 after Entertainment Rights failed to acquire Chorion, Entertainment Rights expanded its programming library by announcing it had brought the in-house programming library of American animation studio Filmation from Hallmark Entertainment. The acquisition of the library of American animation studio Filmation had gained Entertainment Rights worldwide distribution to all of Filmation's productions such as He-Man and The Lone Ranger.

On 13 September 2004, Entertainment Rights announced they had acquired independent live-action & animation company Tell-Tale Productions. The acquisition had expanded Entertainment Rights' programming catalogue and boosted its home entertainment & distribution operations, distributing Tell-Tale's productions internationally such as BB3B with Tell-Tale Productions' co-founders Iain Lachlan and Will Brenton alongside Tell-Tale managing directors Karl Woolley and Helen Cadwallader joining Entertainment Rights to head it's in-house creative division.

By the end of 2004, Entertainment Rights employed 95 people. In the 2005 financial year, Entertainment Rights' revenue was £12.4 million. The company bid for Chorion but the offer was rejected.

In 2005, Siriol Productions came under new management. The company was renamed "Calon". Most of the rights to completed productions were kept by Entertainment Rights. In October 2005, the company expanded their Barbie licensed deal with Mattel to include three more movies. It was further extended again in September 2006. On 31 October 2005, they purchased a majority interest in the Rupert Bear character from the Daily Express.

=== Purchase of Classic Media and Losses (2007-2009) ===
On 14 December 2006, Entertainment Rights announced that they would purchase the U.S.-based licensing company Classic Media for US$210 million (£106.9 million). The deal would bring Classic Media's own IPs, including the Bullwinkle Studios joint-venture with Jay Ward Productions (Rocky & Bullwinkle, George of the Jungle), the Harvey Comics library (Casper the Friendly Ghost), Lassie, the pre-1974 Rankin/Bass Productions library (including Rudolph the Red-Nosed Reindeer and Frosty the Snowman) and Big Idea Productions' (VeggieTales) to the Entertainment Rights portfolio. The deal also included a stake in the joint-venture children's block/network Qubo. The deal was closed on 11 January 2007 and Classic Media became a wholly owned subsidiary.

Before the deal was completed, both companies announced North American home video distribution and production agreements with Genius Products.

On 22 January 2007, the company purchased the Where's Wally? franchise.

In December 2008, the company appointed Deborah Dugan, former president of Disney Publishing Worldwide, as its CEO in North America. There had been financial instability within the company.

By January 2009, the company had dismissed one third of its employees. The company's market value decreased from £267 million in March 2007 to £5.5 million. By February 2009, six companies had requested to purchase Entertainment Rights. Also in February 2009, Entertainment Rights was fined £245,000 by the Financial Services Authority for failing to inform shareholders of "a potential $14 million earnings hit in a timely manner".

=== Administration, new ownership and later history (2009) ===
On 1 April 2009, Entertainment Rights went into voluntary administration. That same day, Boomerang Media announced it had acquired all of Entertainment Rights' subsidiaries including Entertainment Rights itself, Big Idea and Classic Media.

On 11 May 2009, Boomerang Media announced that the former British and U.S. subsidiaries of Entertainment Rights would operate as a unified business under the name "Classic Media", while Big Idea would operate under its own name. Boomerang Media was created by former owners of Classic Media until it was sold to Entertainment Rights in 2006.

The Entertainment Rights PLC company was dissolved on 30 December 2010.

In 2012, Classic Media was acquired by DreamWorks Animation. DreamWorks Animation was then acquired by NBCUniversal in 2016, thus Universal Pictures gaining the rights to most of Entertainment Rights' catalogue of works.

== Programme library ==
=== Original programmes ===
- Potsworth & Co. (1989-1990, as Sleepy Kids, co-produced with Hanna-Barbera and BBC)
- Dr. Zitbag's Transylvania Pet Shop (as Sleepy Kids, co-produced with Fairwater Films, PMMP Productions and Watch It!)
- Budgie the Little Helicopter (as Sleepy Kids, co-produced with HTV and Fred Wolf Films)
- Meeow! (as SKD Media PLC, co-produced with STV, Comataidh Craolaidh Gaidhlig and Siriol Productions)
- Cubeez (2000-2001, co-produced with Cubeez Ltd. and Optical Image Broadcast for GMTV)
- Merlin the Magical Puppy (2002, produced by The Little Entertainment Company)
- The Basil Brush Show (2002–2007; produced by The Foundation)
- Postman Pat (Revival series and Special Delivery Service, 2003–2008, produced by Cosgrove Hall Films)
  - Postman Pat and the Greendale Rocket
  - Postman Pat's Magic Christmas
  - Postman Pat Clowns Around
  - Postman Pat and the Pirate Treasure
  - Postman Pat's Great Big Party
- Little Red Tractor (2004-2005, Series 1-2 only, produced by The Little Entertainment Company)
- Fun Song Factory (Revival series, 2004, produced by Tell-Tale Productions)
- Boo! (2005-2006, Series 2 only, produced by Tell-Tale Productions, co-funded and distributed by Universal Pictures)
- BB3B (2005, produced by Tell-Tale Productions)
- Rupert Bear, Follow the Magic... (2006-2008, produced by Cosgrove Hall Films)

=== Archive programmes ===
==== Banksia Productions ====
- The Curiosity Show
- Hot Science
- Kids Down Under
- The Music Shop

==== Carrington Productions International ====
- Discworld (co-produced with Channel 4, Cosgrove Hall Films, Egmont Imagination and ITEL)
- Lavender Castle (1999-2000, co-produced with Cosgrove Hall Films)

==== Filmation ====
- For a full list of shows, films, shorts and specials, see List of works produced by Filmation.

==== Hibbert Ralph Entertainment ====
- The First Snow of Winter (co-produced with Link Entertainment and BBC)
- The Forgotten Toys (both the TV series and the special; co-produced with United Productions, Meridian Broadcasting and Link Entertainment)
- The Second Star to the Left: A Christmas Tale (co-produced with BBC)

==== Link Entertainment ====
- Animal Antics
- Barney (co-produced with Barney Entertainments Ltd)
- Bill the Minder (produced by Bevanfield Films)
- Bug Alert
- Chatterhappy Ponies
- Christopher Crocodile (co-produced with Mixpix and BBC)
- Deep Sea Dick
- Fairy Tales (produced by Bevanfield Films)
- Ethelbert the Tiger (co-produced with Millimages)
- Eye of the Storm (produced by Childsplay Productions and Meridian Broadcasting)
- Grabbit the Rabbit
- Hamilton Mattress
- Jack and Marcel
- Rudyard Kipling's Just So Stories (produced by Bevanfield Films)
- Monster TV (co-produced with BBC)
- The Morph Files (co-produced with Aardman Animations)
- Orm and Cheep
- Pirates (produced by Childsplay Productions and BBC)
- Preston Pig (co-produced with Varga London)
- Siyabonga
- Tales of a Wise King
- The Slow Norris (co-produced with HTV)
- The Spooks of Bottle Bay (co-produced with Fugitive/Playboard Puppets and Carlton Television)
- The Treacle People (co-produced with Fire Mountain Productions)
- Teddybears (co-produced with United Productions)
- There's A Viking in My Bed (co-produced with BBC)
- Tiny (co-produced with Martin Gates Productions)
- Jane Speakman's Tiny Tales

==== Martin Gates Productions ====
- Molly's Gang

==== Maddocks Animation ====
- Caribou Kitchen
- The Family-Ness
- Jimbo and the Jet Set
- Penny Crayon

==== Siriol Productions Ltd. ====
- The Blobs
- Hilltop Hospital
- Romuald the Reindeer

==== Queensgate Productions ====
- Stoppit and Tidyup (co-produced with CMTB Animation)
- The Trap Door (co-produced with CMTB Animation)

==== Carrington Productions International ====
- The Snow Queen
- The Snow Queen's Revenge
- Friendly Monsters
- Jack and the Beanstalk
- The Ugly Duckling

==== Trumptonshire ====
- Camberwick Green (co-produced with BBC)
- Chigley (co-produced with BBC)
- Trumpton (co-produced with BBC)

==== Tube Studios ====
- Inuk (co-produced with Canadian Television Fund, CBC, Shaw Broadcast Television Fund, Télé-Québec and APTN)

==== Woodland Animations ====
- For a full list of shows and details, see Woodland Animations.

=== Distribution rights ===
==== Transformers ====
- Transformers: Armada (co-produced with Hasbro, Takara Tomy, Æon, Dangun Pictures, Hangzhou Feilong Animation Ltd, M.S.J. Musashino-Seisakujo, Paramount Domestic Television and SD Entertainment)
- Transformers: Energon (co-produced with Hasbro, Takara Tomy, We've Inc, ACTAS, Inc., A-CAT, Studio Galapagos and TV Tokyo)
- Transformers: Cybertron (co-produced with Hasbro, Takara Tomy, We've Inc, TV Aichi, GONZO, Sun Woo Entertainment and Voice Box Productions)
- Transformers: Animated (co-produced with Hasbro, Takara Tomy, The Answer Studio, MOOK DLE, Studio 4 °C and Cartoon Network Studios)

==== Miscellaneous ====
- The Story of Tracy Beaker (2002–2005; produced by the BBC)
- Short Cuts (2002-2003; produced by Burberry Productions)
- Custer's Last Stand-up (produced by BBC and RTÉ)
- Dr Otter (produced by Red Balloon Productions)
- My Parents Are Aliens (1999-2006; produced by Yorkshire Television and ITV)
- Finley the Fire Engine (produced by RHI Entertainment and Kickstart Productions)
- Inuk (produced by Tube Studios)
- Katie and Orbie (2001-2002; produced with Amberwood Entertainment)
- Finger Tips (2001-2004; produced with The Foundation)
- The New Adventures of He-Man (produced with Jetlag Productions)
- Titch (1998-1999, 2005, produced by Hutchins Film Company and Yorkshire Television)

== Right Entertainment ==
Right Entertainment
- Type: Division
- Industry: Home video
- Founded: July 2001; 25 years ago
- Defunct: May 2009; 17 years ago
- Fate: Folded and rebranded under the Classic Media name
- Successor: Classic Media
- Products: Home video
- Parent: Entertainment Rights

Right Entertainment was a home video company that released Entertainment Rights' properties on VHS and DVD in the United Kingdom, alongside some acquisitions from third-party companies.

Entertainment Rights formed Right Entertainment at the beginning of July 2001 and signed a $500,000 advance UK/Ireland distribution deal with Universal Pictures (UK) Ltd to distribute their releases. Right's release schedule would start off with VHS releases of Barbie in the Nutcracker and existing ER property Cubeez in 2001, followed up with Clifford the Big Red Dog and Casper the Friendly Ghost releases, and DVD release of Barbie following up in 2002. The company also announced an international home video expansion for their properties, beginning with Universal obtaining non-UK/Ireland home video rights to Barbie in the Nutcracker, but ruled out if Universal would distribute other properties outside the UK as well.

Right Entertainment's first title - Barbie in the Nutcracker, was released on VHS on 29 October 2001 to a huge commercial success, which went on to sell 100,000 units within its first week of release. By April 2002, after which the movie was released on DVD as well, 700,000 copies were sold across both formats. This deal later led to home video and TV rights being secured for the sequel - Barbie as Rapunzel.

Another secured success with Right was the release of the first Merlin the Magical Puppy video in March 2002, which entered into the top ten children's video charts. Right secured home video and DVD rights to the CITV arts and crafts series Finger Tips in June 2002 after ER acquired worldwide distribution rights. This was followed up with UK home video rights to Clifford the Big Red Dog the following month as ER already held consumer product rights to the franchise itself.

Around the same time, Right would take over releasing Postman Pat titles (as a result of Entertainment Rights purchasing Woodland Animations a year prior).

In April 2004, Right secured UK home video and DVD rights to Clifford's Puppy Days.

In September 2008, Right secured the UK DVD rights to Frankenstein's Cat.

Right Entertainment's last two titles - Barbie: Thumbelina and Postman Pat Special Delivery Service: To the Rescue!, were released on DVD on 16 March 2009.

Following the folding of Entertainment Rights into Classic Media, Right Entertainment was also folded under the de-facto Classic Media name, although the copyright was now changed to read "Classic Media Distribution Ltd." on DVD cases. The company continued with its UK home video deal with Universal Pictures (UK) Ltd.
