= Wish Films =

UK animation and live-action studio

- Company type: Subsidiary
- Industry: Animation; Films and television
- Genre: Family entertainment
- Foundation: 1994 (As Tell-Tale Productions); 2006 (As Wish Films)
- Products: Fun Song Factory; Tweenies; Boo!; BB3B; Jim Jam and Sunny; Wibbly Pig
- Founder or creator: Will Brenton; Iain Lauchlan
- Heads: Will Brenton; Iain Lauchlan
- Parent owner: DreamWorks Classics (2013-present)
- Steward owner: DreamWorks Animation (2013-present)
- Contractors: DreamWorks Classics; BBC Studios; CITV; Gullane Entertainment; HIT Entertainment; Studio 100; Clockwork Zoo
- Replaced: Tell Tale Productions
- Distributor: Universal Pictures (via DreamWorks Classics, except for Tweenies)

Wish Films is an animation and live-action studio, established by Will Brenton and Iain Lauchlan in 2006. It is the successor to Tell-Tale Productions, which was formed in 1994, first producing live shows, and later went on to produce TV shows.

Most of Wish's catalogue when it was known as Tell-Tale Productions is currently owned by NBCUniversal (via DreamWorks Animation), with the exception of Tweenies, which is owned by BBC Studios. The rights to Boo! have been owned by NBCUniversal since 2003, followed by the most of their shows in 2016.

== History ==
=== As Tell-Tale Productions ===
On 14 September 2001, Tell-Tale signed a deal with Gullane Entertainment for the production on two new shows, Ella, and Sprogs, with the latter company distributing the series.

On 26 July 2002, the BBC picked up the UK broadcasting rights to Boo! for broadcast in September 2003. On September 1 that year, it was announced that Universal Pictures had acquired worldwide distribution rights to the series.

On 18 September 2002, Tell-Tale announced the production of a hybrid 2D/3D series titled WARP. On the same day, it was confirmed that the distribution rights to Ella and Sprogs reverted to Tell-Tale after the deal with Gullane fell through due to HIT Entertainment's acquisition of Gullane, alongside the production on two 60-minute direct-to-video Tweenies specials.

On 1 February 2003, the company signed a property management deal with LMI for Sprogs, alongside a deal with BBC Music to allow music production for the series, which would air in early 2004.

On 27 January 2004, Carlton International acquired distribution rights to Sprogs. The company purchased the home video rights in all regions except for the US and French-speaking territories, and worldwide TV rights excluding the UK, the US, and French and German-speaking territories. It was also confirmed that CBBC had acquired the UK broadcast rights to the series for a late 2004 broadcast date.

On 13 September 2004, Entertainment Rights announced they would acquire Tell-Tale for £3.1 million. The buyout would include the rights to Sprogs, which had, by then been renamed BB3B (previously handled by Carlton) and would be broadcast on CBBC in late 2005, alongside the rights to a new reboot of Fun Song Factory to air on CITV. The Tweenies property was retained by BBC Worldwide although Entertainment Rights would gain royalty income for the property, alongside rights to a planned feature-length film adaptation of the series. The purchase was completed on 1 October 2004.

On 20 December 2005, ITV acquired the broadcast rights to Jim Jam and Sunny for broadcast on the then-new CITV Channel, and that production would start in 2006, being the largest broadcast deal made by ITV for a children's series.

=== Wish Films ===
In 2006, Will Brenton and Iain Lauchlan reformed Tell-Tale Productions as Wish Films. The company took over production of Jim Jam and Sunny, which premiered on CITV later that year.

In 2008, Wish produced their first international co-production, a TV adaptation of Wibbly Pig, based on the children's book of the same name by Mick Inkpen, with Canadian-based 9 Story Entertainment, with the latter holding distribution rights in the Americas, and BBC Worldwide holding distribution rights in all other regions.

On 6 May 2010, CBeebies commissioned a new show from Wish to air on the channel's summer schedule called Mighty-Mites, presented by Sarah-Jane Honeywell.

Other shows produced by Wish around these time frames include Florrie's Dragons, a co-production with Studio 100 and Clockwork Zoo, and Melody, a co-production with LAAH Entertainment.

== Filmography ==
=== Television series ===
Title	Year(s)	Broadcaster(s)	Notes
Fun Song Factory	1994	Direct-to-Video	Co-production with Abbey Broadcast Communications
Fun Song Factory 2	1996	Direct-to-Video	Co-production with Abbey Broadcast Communications
Party Time at the Fun Song Factory	1996	Direct-to-Video	Co-production with Abbey Broadcast Communications
The Fun Song Factory at Old MacDonald's Farm	1996	Direct-to-Video	Co-production with Abbey Broadcast Communications
Christmas at the Fun Song Factory	1996	Direct-to-Video	Co-production with Abbey Broadcast Communications
Fun Song Factory – Fun and Games	1997	Direct-to-Video	Co-production with Abbey Broadcast Communications
Fun Song Factory – Nursery Rhyme Land	1997	Direct-to-Video	Co-production with Abbey Broadcast Communications
Fun Song Factory	1998–2004	GMTV/CITV	Co-production with Abbey Broadcast Communications (season 1) and Entertainment Rights (season 2)
Tweenies	1999–2002	BBC One; BBC Two; CBeebies	Co-production with the BBC
Wow! That's What I Call Nursery Rhymes	1999	Direct-to-Video	Co-production with Abbey Broadcast Communications
Wow! That's What I Call Christmas	2000	Direct-to-Video	Co-production with Abbey Broadcast Communications
Boo!	2003–06	CBeebies	Co-production with Universal Pictures Visual Programming
WARP	2003	N/A	TV pilot
Sprogs	2003	N/A	TV pilot
Jim Jam	2003	N/A	TV pilot
Tweenies - Night-Time Magic	2003	Direct-to-Video	Co-production with BBC Worldwide
Tweenies - Jungle Adventure	2004	Direct-to-Video	Co-production with BBC Worldwide
BB3B	2004	CBBC	Co-production with Entertainment Rights
Jim Jam and Sunny	2006–08	CITV Channel	First production as Wish Films; Co-production with Entertainment Rights
Wibbly Pig	2009–10	CBeebies; TVO (Canada)	Co-production with 9 Story Entertainment
Mighty Mites	2010	CBeebies	
Florrie's Dragons	2010–11	Playhouse Disney	co-production with Studio 100 and Clockwork Zoo
Melody	2013–15	CBeebies	Co-production with LAAH Entertainment and BBC Music (Series 2)

=== Live theatrical shows ===
Title	Touring Year(s)	Notes
Tweenies Live!	2001 (United Kingdom); 2002 (Australia)	Co-produced with DC Entertainment and BBC Worldwide
Tweenies Live! - The Christmas Present	2001-2002, 2003-2004	Co-produced with DC Entertainment and BBC Worldwide
Tweenies Live! 2 - The Fab-a-Rooney Tour	2002	Co-produced with DC Entertainment and BBC Worldwide
Thomas & Friends: The Big Live Tour	2002-2003	Co-produced with DC Entertainment and HIT Entertainment
Thomas & Friends: The All Aboard! Live Tour	2004	Co-produced with DC Entertainment and HIT Entertainment; The 2005 Japanese run was produced by Fuji Television, while the 2006 run was produced by IVE Limited and Trend & Culture
Tweenies Live! - No Sleep 'til Bedtime	2005	Co-produced with DC Entertainment and BBC Worldwide; All future Tweenies Live! shows were solely produced by BBC Worldwide
CBeebies Live!	2005	Co-produced with BBC Worldwide; All future CBeebies Live! shows were solely produced by BBC Worldwide
