= Cubeez =

British animated television series

- Genre: 3D animation
- Directed by: Dave Osborne
- Country of origin: United Kingdom
- No. of series: 2
- No. of episodes: 104

Production
- Executive producers: David Clement; Neil Jones
- Producers: Tony Palk; Sarah Greene; Vo Fletcher
- Running time: 11 minutes, 23 minutes or 18 minutes
- Production companies: Cubeez Ltd; Optical Image Broadcast; Cubeedobeedo Ltd; Starsound B.V.

Original release
- Network: ITV (GMTV Kids)
- Release: 23 July 2000 – 30 March 2001

Cubeez is a British animated preschool education television series that was broadcast between July 2000 and March 2001 on GMTV's Kids. It is aimed at pre-school children aged 2–5. The four box-like characters, Bozz, Doody, Dink and Tizzy are accompanied on their adventures by a talking paintbrush (voiced by Marc Silk) and a variety of other characters.

The show was animated using Discreet 3ds Max. Each episode has a strong educational element and features live-action footage of children.

== Characters ==
=== Cubeez ===
- Bozz (voiced by Keith Wickham) – A pink male cubee who is the leader of the four.
- Doody (voiced by Tara Newley) – An orange female cubee who wears round red glasses.
- Dink (voiced by Mike Walling) – A blue male cubee.
- Tizzy (voiced by Jan Haydn Rowles) – A yellow female cubee.

=== Friends ===
- Learning Wall (voiced by Bob Golding (season 1), Gabriella Lewis (season 2)
- Boingles (voiced by Bob Golding)
- Wiggywams (voiced by Bob Golding)
- Eyesanozes (voiced by Bob Golding)
- Artist the Paintbrush (voiced by Bob Golding)
- Tok Tok (voiced by Bob Golding)
- Bobby Bingle Boingle
- Aunt Boingle
- Pecking Circle Pecker
- Peebo

== Episodes ==
1. A Musical Day
2. Music
3. Telling Stories
4. Busy Bears and Boingles
5. Growing
6. Transport and Speed
7. Weather
8. Colours and Patterns
9. Shapes
10. Counting
11. Fast and Slow
12. Up and Over
13. High and Low
14. Emotions
15. One to Five
16. Helping Hands
17. Caring for the Environment
18. Transport
19. Sight and Sound
20. Sports Day
21. Eyes and Noses
22. Home Sweet Home
23. Hop, Skip and Jump
24. A Windy Day
25. Happy Birthday Dink
26. Fixing Things
27. Round and About
28. Lollipops and Flowers
29. Animals
30. Lost and Found
31. Pairs
32. Lollypops
33. Cylla
34. Circles and Squares
35. Bobby Bingle Boingle
36. The Eyesanozes
37. Music Box
38. Flowers
39. The Skeeta Race
40. Night And Day
41. Storytime
42. Over And Under
43. Spots And Stripes
44. Mending and Making
45. Shapes and Sizes
46. Party Time
47. Ice Cubeez
48. Over and Out
49. Slow or Fast
50. Everything Has a Pattern
51. Fun with Friends
52. Three, Two, One
53. Moves
54. Ups and Downs
55. Colours
56. Sounds Like
57. Changing Colours
58. Doc Bozz
59. Rise and Shine
60. See, Hear, Feel
61. Go Round
62. Five
63. Storytime (season 2)
64. Seasons and Flowers
65. Fairplay
66. Loud and Quiet
67. Once Upon a Time
68. Surprise Surprise
69. Dance Dance Dance
70. Unknown Easter Special?
71. Unknown Christmas Special?

== VHS/DVDs ==
In the United Kingdom, Right Entertainment and Universal Pictures Video released the series on VHS and DVD, using the half-hour version of the programme and containing three episodes each.

The first VHS volume, titled "Colours and Shapes", was released on 27 May 2002, and contains the episodes "Colours and Patterns", "Shapes" and "Counting". The second VHS volume – "Musical Storytime", was released on 14 August 2002, and contains the episodes "Music", "Telling Stories" and "Busy Bears and Boingles". They were released on DVD on 10 May and 16 August 2004, respectively.

The third VHS/DVD volume, titled Up & Over, was released on 7 February 2005, and contains the episodes "Fast and Slow", "Up and Over" and "High and Low". The final volume, released only on DVD, titled "Growing", was released on 2 May 2005 and contains the episodes "Growing", "Transport and Speed" and "Weather".
