= Sid Owen =

English actor and TV presenter (born 1972)

- Born: David John Sutton; 12 January 1972 (age 54); London, England
- Occupations: Actor; television presenter; singer
- Years active: 1983–present
- Partner(s): Carty Hubbard (1999–2003); Polly Parsons (2006–2012)
- Children: 1

Sid Owen (born David John Sutton; 12 January 1972) is an English actor, television presenter and former singer from London, who played Ricky Butcher in the BBC soap opera EastEnders (1988–2000, 2002–2004, 2008–2012, 2022–2023). He also appeared in the tenth series of Strictly Come Dancing and made a cameo performance in the British cult show How Clean is Your House in 2005.

== Career ==
Prior to his role in EastEnders, he had a role in the film Revolution in 1985, in which he appeared alongside Al Pacino and Donald Sutherland. In 1988, he was cast in the BBC soap opera EastEnders as Ricky Butcher, son of character Frank Butcher. His character's relationships with Sam Mitchell (Danniella Westbrook) and Bianca Jackson (Patsy Palmer) became popular in the 1990s. He appeared regularly on the show until April 2000 when he decided to leave the show and tried his hand at pop music releasing his cover version of Michael Jackson's 1972 song, "We've Got a Good Thing Going" on Mushroom Records. The song reached No. 14 in the UK Singles Chart in June 2000. A follow-up single was recorded but never released. He had earlier released a 1995 Children in Need single with Patsy Palmer, "You Better Believe It". That track reached No. 60 in the UK chart.

He returned to EastEnders in 2002, first appearing in a spin-off episode Ricky and Bianca which aired in May 2002 which saw his character reunite with his ex-wife Bianca. He returned to the show as a regular later in the year and was axed in 2004 due to lack of storylines. Returning to television work, Owen appeared on an episode of Lily Savage's Blankety Blank in 2001, and took part in the fifth series of I'm a Celebrity, Get Me Out of Here! in 2005, where he carried out the first bushtucker trial with David Dickinson. He finished third in the series. He also took part in a celebrity boxing match with Ben Fogle, for Sport Relief, which Fogle ultimately won. Owen also starred in ITV1's prison drama Bad Girls in 2006, during the shows eighth and final series. His character fell for prisoner Janine Nebeski, played by his ex-EastEnders co-star, Nicola Stapleton. Owen appeared in The Bill on 6 November 2007.

On 30 October 2007, it was confirmed that Owen would make his return to EastEnders in 2008. This news came 24 hours after the announcement that Patsy Palmer, his on-screen wife, was also returning to the show. In February 2011 he announced that he was taking a break from the show. Of his decision Owen said, "I will be taking a break from EastEnders so that I can dedicate more time to Drop 4 Drop, a charity to help alleviate the global water crisis in the developing world. Ricky will definitely be returning to Walford at some point next year." He appeared in Snow White and the Seven Dwarfs from December 2007 to January 2008 at The Beck Theatre, Hayes, Middlesex as Prince Charming. He also presented series 8 of To Buy or Not to Buy with Melinda Messenger. In January 2012, Owen once again left EastEnders after four years back in the role. He returned for a few weeks in June 2012, before leaving again to run a restaurant in France

On 10 September 2012, it was announced that Owen would be a contestant for the tenth series of Strictly Come Dancing. He was partnered with Ola Jordan. He and Jordan were the third couple to be eliminated, losing out in the dance-off against Colin Salmon.

Owen took part in the 2016 series of The Jump on Channel 4. In 2016, Owen signed a contract with the BBC and opined that he should return to EastEnders to "finish the storyline or go back for a length of time." In August 2022, it was confirmed that he would reprise his role as Ricky for a brief stint.

Owen participated in 2023 in the Channel 4 reality simulation of jail life Banged Up, saying that "he's the first member of his family not to go to jail for real, so he's keen to see what it's like."

== Personal life ==
Owen has four brothers, his father David was an alcoholic who left home when he was six years old; his mother, Joan, died from pancreatic cancer when he was eight. He then attended Anna Scher Theatre school. Owen's favourite hobby is football, playing in many celebrity matches in the process and is an Arsenal supporter. In 2000 to 2003, he was engaged to Carty Hubbard. In October 2006, he began a relationship with Genie in the House actress, Polly Parsons. In April 2012, Owen told the Sunday Mirror that they were still good friends but not together any more and that he was single. Owen had a daughter in 2022.

== Filmography ==
Year	Title	Role	Notes
1983	Jury	Barry Thompson	1 episode
1984	Weekend Playhouse	Patrick	1 episode
1984	Bottle Boys	Boy	1 episode
1987	William Tell	Orphan Child	1 episode
1988–2000, 2002–2004, 2008–2012, 2022–2023	EastEnders	Ricky Butcher	Series regular
1985	Revolution	Young Ned	Film
2000	Cat Burglar	Tom	Film
2004	Sport Relief	Himself	Contestant
2005	I'm a Celebrity, Get Me Out of Here!	Himself	Contestant
2006	Bad Girls	Donny Kimber	Main role
2007	The Bill	Trevor Jones	4 episodes
2008	To Buy or Not to Buy	Himself	Presenter
2010–2011	EastEnders: E20	Ricky Butcher	4 episodes
2012	The Real Hustle	Himself	1 episode
2012	Strictly Come Dancing	Himself	Contestant
2016	The Jump	Himself	Contestant
2023	Banged Up	Himself	Reality show

== Discography ==
Year	Single	UK Singles Chart
1995	"Better Believe It (Children in Need)"; Sid Owen and Patsy Palmer	60
2000	"Good Thing Going"; Sid Owen featuring Chukki Starr	14
