= Will Brenton =

British director, producer, and writer

- Occupations: Writer, producer, director
- Notable work: Fun Song Factory

William Brenton is an English writer, producer and director who has worked in many areas of television and theatre, primarily through his companies Tell-Tale productions and Wish Films, both of which he founded with Iain Lauchlan. Together they gained six BAFTA nominations, as well as many other awards for their work together. They won a 2000 BAFTA, Best Pre-School Live Action.

They first met as presenters on the BBC children's programme Playdays, where they presented the Tent Stop together. From there they went on the write and appear in the pantomimes at the Belgrade Theatre in Coventry, from 1991 up to 2000. These pantomimes are still performed all over the UK today by Imagine Theatre. During that time they created and produced many of the UK's favourite TV shows for children, including The Tweenies, Fun Song Factory, Boo! and BB3B. Later, as Wish Films, they also created Jim Jam and Sunny for ITV.

Brenton also directed Coronation Street and Emmerdale in the 1990s, and in 2010 he co-wrote and directed the very successful Doctor Who live tour, The Monsters Are Coming starring Nigel Planer, a sixteen-piece rock band playing the music of Murray Gold and playing in arenas all over the UK.

Will has also written children's books, his first titles Claude and Elephant White being released in 2011–2012, published by Egmont and Templar respectively.

More recently, Brenton has continued writing and directing shows for the Arena circuit, including CBeebies - Stars, Justin and Friends and CBeebies - The Big Band as well as writing and directing live shows for The Hairy Bikers and directing David Hasselhoff in Peter Pan at the Manchester Opera House.

In 2015, Will Brenton wrote and directed the next Basil Brush Live show and the next Justin and Friends - Mr Tumble's Circus arena tour.

He has also developed and produced Melody, a show for CBeebies about a partially-sighted girl and the stories she imagines when listening to classical music. A second series was produced in the Autumn of 2014.

Lauchlan left Wish Films in 2009, and Will ran the company with Helen Cadwallader. They went on to produce a TV adaptation of Mick Inkpen's Wibbly Pig books (nominated for a Gemini in Canada) and 64 Zoo Lane creator An Vrombaut's Dear Dragon books, which have aired on Disney Junior UK as Florrie's Dragons.
