= Melody (TV series) =

- Genre: Children's television series
- Created by: Luke Howard
- Directed by: Luke Howard
- Starring: Angharad Rhodes; Laura Bacon
- Country of origin: United Kingdom
- Original language: English
- No. of series: 2

Production
- Executive producers: Michael Towner (CBeebies); Katy Jones (BBC Learning)
- Producers: Will Brenton; Luke Howard
- Running time: 7 minutes
- Production companies: LAAH Entertainment; BBC Music; Wish Films

Original release
- Release: 2 December 2013 – 24 July 2015

Melody is a British preschool mixed-media music television series created by Luke Howard, and produced by Wish Films and LAAH Entertainment for the BBC. Designed with disabled children in mind, it features a little girl with a visual impairment as the main character. Melody is also available on BBC iPlayer for over a year.

Melody was developed with help from the RNIB Pears Centre in Coventry, which supports children with sight problems and additional needs. While helping to create the programme, the Pears Centre conducted research into animation and soundtracks that are easier for blind and partially sighted people to follow.

== Premise ==
Melody introduces pre-school children to classical music through the main character's imagined stories, and specially created animations that are more enjoyable for visually impaired viewers.

In each episode Melody undertakes an everyday activity with her mother. The fun she has, or the frustrations or difficulties she experiences, prompts her to want to listen to a piece of music. Her mother suggests a piece and gives Melody some headphones and an MP3 player to listen to it. Through animation, we are taken on an adventure through Melody's imagination as she listens to the music.

== Cast and characters ==
- Angharad Rhodes as Melody – A girl with an incredible imagination, who is partially sighted. Melody is played by 10-year-old partially sighted actress Angharad Rhodes, who was cast after being spotted at UCAN ("Unique Creative Arts Network"), a specialist theatre company in Cardiff for children with vision problems.
- Laura Bacon as Melody's mother - Who plays with her and presents her with music to listen to.
- Fudge as himself – Melody's bright orange and white stuffed toy cat.

== Production ==
The animation for the show was produced by six different studios:

- King Bee Animation
- Keyframe Studios
- Finger Industries
- Tentacle Media
- Sea Monster
- Factory Transmedia

The characters were designed by art director Keith Robinson who also oversaw the overall look of the series. He also designed the logo and branding for the show. Lizzie Dyson designed the backgrounds.

One of the show's producers, Will Brenton, explains that Melody's sight difficulties are never mentioned directly. "We often see her using her white cane, or placing her hand on top of her mum's whilst they cut something," he says. "It is never about what Melody can't do or needs help with, but always about what she can do and the methods she uses to do as much as most children."

== Broadcast ==
The first series of 20 programmes was broadcast on CBeebies, in the United Kingdom, in December 2013 and January 2014, with a two-week break after the tenth programme. These episodes are also audio-described; an additional vocal narrative track fills gaps in the dialogue with helpful information for those who can't see what's happening on screen.

A second series of 20 programmes started being broadcast in March 2015.

== Episodes ==
=== Series 1 ===
No.	Title	Composer	Piece	Original release date
1	"Let's Race"	Sergei Prokofiev	Romeo and Juliet, Dance of the Knights	2 December 2013
Melody imagines two dinosaurs having a race. One is fast and the other is slow.
2	"Muddy Melody"	Aaron Copland	Fanfare for the Common Man	3 December 2013
Melody imagines she is a jungle explorer who has found a baby elephant playing in the mud.
3	"Red Riding Hood"	Camille Saint-Saëns	Danse Macabre	4 December 2013
Melody imagines the story of Little Red Riding Hood when she hears some dramatic music.
4	"Fast Little Train"	Sergei Prokofiev	Finale: Molto vivace, fourth movement, from Symphony No. 1	5 December 2013
Melody imagines a story about a little train who wants to make his journey go faster.
5	"Promises"	Ralph Vaughan Williams	Fantasia on a Theme by Thomas Tallis	6 December 2013
Melody imagines a princess in a castle who breaks her promise to a frog.
6	"The Lost Bee"	Nikolai Rimsky-Korsakov	Flight of the Bumblebee from Act 3, The Tale of Tsar Saltan	9 December 2013
Melody listens to Flight of the Bumblebee by Rimsky-Korsakov and goes on a bee adventure.
7	"Melody and the Snowman"	Pyotr Ilyich Tchaikovsky	Sugar Plum Fairy and her Cavalier, from The Nutcracker	10 December 2013
Melody imagines a story of a lonely snowman and a little girl.
8	"Best Friends"	Gustav Holst	Jupiter, from The Planets	11 December 2013
Melody listens to Jupiter by Holst and imagines the story of friends who are separated.
9	"The Elves and the Shoemaker"	John Adams	Short Ride in a Fast Machine	12 December 2013
Melody listens to Short Ride In a Fast Machine composed by John Adams.
10	"Butterfly Ball"	Luigi Boccherini	Minuet, third movement from String Quintet in E	13 December 2013
Melody imagines that she and Fudge are playing chase through a field of flowers.
11	"Ugly Duckling"	Pyotr Ilyich Tchaikovsky	Scène: Moderato, Lake in the Moonlight, the opening to Act II of Swan Lake	30 December 2013
Melody hears some music from Swan Lake and imagines the story of the ugly duckling.
12	"Coat of Leaves"	Antonio Vivaldi	Allegro, third movement, from The Four Seasons, Concerto No. 3 in F major (Autumn)	31 December 2013
Melody listens to The Four Seasons - Autumn by Vivaldi, and imagines the seasons changing.
13	"Flying High"	Ralph Vaughan Williams	The Lark Ascending	1 January 2014
Melody listens to The Lark Ascending and imagines a world of birds flying high.
14	"Selfish Shellfish"	Camille Saint-Saëns	Aquarium, from Le carnaval des animaux (Carnival of the Animals)	2 January 2014
Melody listens to watery music and imagines a story about a selfish shellfish.
15	"Tiptoe Troll"	Edvard Grieg	In the Hall of the Mountain King, from Peer Gynt, Suite No.1	3 January 2014
Melody imagines a story about trolls stealing treasure – including the king's crown.
16	"Unlikely Partners"	Edward Elgar	Adagio, first movement, from Cello Concerto in E minor	6 January 2014
Melody imagines a story a dancing hippo and mouse.
17	"A Royal Stink"	George Frideric Handel	Ouverture, first movement, from Music for the Royal Fireworks Suite	7 January 2014
Melody asks for royal music, and Mum finds Music for the Royal Fireworks, by Handel.
18	"When the Cat's Away"	Johann Strauss the Younger	Annen Polka	8 January 2014
Melody accidentally leaves Fudge at Grandma's house.
19	"Boat Ballet"	Erik Satie	Gymnopédie: 1. Lent et douloureux	9 January 2014
Melody imagines a beautiful boat ballet with dancing swans when she goes to the park.
20	"The White Whale"	Edward Elgar	Nimrod, from Enigma Variations	10 January 2014
Melody listens to Nimrod by Edward Elgar and imagines some graceful dancing whales.

=== Series 2 ===
No.	Title	Composer	Piece	Original release date
1	"Owl"	Ludwig van Beethoven	Moonlight Sonata	16 March 2015
2	"Gingerbread Man"	Mikis Theodorakis	Zorba's Dance	17 March 2015
3	"The Fox and the Chicken"	Dmitri Shostakovich	III. Foxtrot from Jazz Suite No.1	18 March 2015
4	"Wooden Horse"	Jacques Offenbach	Infernal Galop	19 March 2015
5	"Emperor's New Clothes"	George Frideric Handel	The Arrival of the Queen of Sheba	20 March 2015
6	"Friendly Shadows"	Benjamin Britten	II. Playful Pizzicato from Simple Symphony	23 March 2015
7	"Clever Magpie"	Gioachino Rossini	The Thieving Magpie Overture	24 March 2015
8	"Princess and the Pea"	Dmitri Shostakovich	Tahiti Trot	25 March 2015
9	"Balloon Ride"	Johann Sebastian Bach	Air on the G String	26 March 2015
10	"Imagination"	Camille Saint-Saëns	Le cygne (The Swan) from The Carnival of the Animals	27 March 2015
11	"Noisy Elephant"	Wolfgang Amadeus Mozart	IV. Rondo from Horn Concerto No. 4 in E-flat major	13 July 2015
12	"Firebird"	Igor Stravinsky	The Firebird	14 July 2015
13	"Up the Hill"	Modest Mussorgsky	Night on Bald Mountain	15 July 2015
14	"Storm"	Benjamin Britten	'Storm' Interlude from 'Peter Grimes'	16 July 2015
15	"Rocket Trip"	Gustav Holst	Mars, the Bringer of War from The Planets	17 July 2015
16	"Who's at the Door"	Ludwig van Beethoven	I. Allegro con brio from Symphony No. 5	20 July 2015
17	"Music Box"	Claude Debussy	Clair de Lune from Suite bergamasque	21 July 2015
18	"Little Blue Butterfly"	George Gershwin	Rhapsody in Blue	22 July 2015
19	"New Bell"	John Philip Sousa	The Liberty Bell	23 July 2015
20	"Tallest Towers"	Johann Sebastian Bach	Toccata and Fugue in D Minor	24 July 2015

== Reception ==
Reaction from the partially sighted community has been "very exciting" according to Brenton. "They can really connect with an aspirational, capable character overcoming the same or similar obstacles."

On the CBeebies Grownups blog, one parent writes: "I find it difficult to find TV programmes for my visually impaired son that are easily accessible. I love the idea of having a young girl starring that is visually impaired, these sort of programmes are great in helping children that have additional needs feel less isolated."
