= Katy Stephens =

British actress (born 1970)

- Occupations: Actor, presenter
- Years active: 1990-present
- Known for: The Fun Song Factory

Katy Stephens is an English actress and former children's presenter. She has appeared in leading roles with Shakespeare's Globe and the Royal Shakespeare Company with whom she is an Associate Artist. She played Nicky in London's Burning, and was a co-presenter on The Fun Song Factory in the 1990s.

== Theatre ==
Stephens’ work with the Royal Shakespeare Company includes Rosalind in As You Like It, Tamora in Titus Andronicus, Cleopatra in Antony and Cleopatra, Regan in King Lear, Petruchio in Taming of the Shrew, Sarah in Mark Ravenhill's Candide, Katy in Silence, a co-production with Filter Theatre, and Joan of Arc/Margaret of Anjou in Sir Michael Boyd's Histories Cycle. Work for Shakespeare's Globe includes Clytemnestra in The Oresteia, Calpurnia in Julius Caesar and Iras in Antony and Cleopatra for The Complete Walk films.

Other appearances include:

- Agrippa in Antony and Cleopatra for the National Theatre and NT Live
- Cominius in Coriolanus for Sheffield Crucible Theatre
- Mrs. Arbuthnot in A Woman of No Importance Classic Spring Theatre
- Lady Macbeth in Othello for Bristol Tobacco Factory Theatres
- Beatrice in A View from the Bridge for Bristol Tobacco Factory Theatres.
- Titania in Midsummer Night's Dream for Bath Theatre Royal.
- Myrtle Logue in The King's Speech for Birmingham Repertory Theatre.
- Woman in Mine for Shared Experience
- Kate in Calixto Bieito's Forests
- Extensive seasons at the Belgrade Theatre Coventry
- Core company member of Colchester Mercury Theatre

Stephens trained at The Royal Welsh College of Music and Drama and the National Youth Theatre.

== Ego Performance Company ==
Stephens is a board member for Ego Performance Company, a charity working with performers of all ages and abilities in Coventry.

== Television ==
- Ellington (1994)
- London's Burning (1996–1998)
- Orna A short drama, played Mona (2015)

== Film ==
- Touch (1990)
- Relative Values (1999)
- Prick Thy Neighbour (2014)

== TV presenting ==
- Fun Song Factory (1997–1998)
- WOW! - That's What I Call Nursery Rhymes (1999)
- WOW! - That's What I Call Christmas (1999)
