= Abbey Home Media =

Home media distributor

Abbey Home Media Group Limited
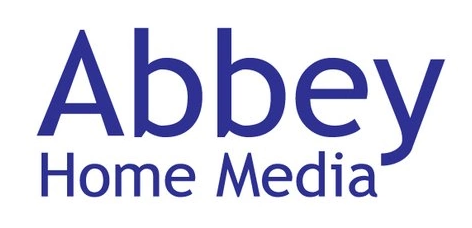
- Type: Private limited company
- Genre: DVD and video distributor
- Predecessor: MSD Video; Collins Video; Tempo Video; Abbey Home Entertainment Group Limited; Just Entertainment
- Founded: March 4, 2002; 24 years ago
- Founder: Ian Miles; Anne Miles
- Defunct: December 13, 2022; 3 years ago
- Fate: Dissolved
- Headquarters: London, UK
- Products: DVDs
- Divisions: Abbey Kids
- Subsidiaries: Baby Bright Media Limited; Tolly Music Limited; Abbey Broadcast Communications PLC; Petalcraft Demonstrations Limited; Ashgarden Limited
- Website: Archived website

Abbey Home Media was a British home media distributor that released content aimed at children. It was founded in March 2002, as the successor company to Abbey Home Entertainment (AHE), which was acquired by the Just Group in 2000.

Abbey Home Media released content from outside production companies, and also produced its own franchises, which included Bump the Elephant, Fun Song Factory, Wide-Eye and Baby Bright.

== History and predecessors ==
=== Abbey Home Entertainment ===
Abbey Home Media's predecessor was Abbey Home Entertainment Group Limited (AHE), founded in 1989 by husband and wife Ian and Anne Miles. AHE acquired the Tempo Video brand name from W.M. Collins Video in 1990 and introduced several sub-labels:

- Tempo Kids Club – Used for re-releases of older Tempo Video releases which had been distributed by their previous owners, MSD Video and Collins Video.
- Tempo Pre-School – Used for releases aimed at very young children. The success of its releases made AHE the only home video distributor in the UK whose releases were approved and endorsed by the Pre-School Learning Alliance. The label remained after the Just Entertainment buyout (as a pre-school brand within Just) and was used in the Abbey Home Media era, before it was retired in favour of the regular Abbey Home Media brand in the mid-2000s.
- Abbey Fitness – Used for fitness releases.
- Abbey Freetime – Used for documentary releases.
- Abbey Music – Used for music and concert releases.

A subsidiary called Abbey Broadcast Communications produced original content for AHE on both VHS and audio cassette. This division became dormant in the early 2000s.

In 1995, PolyGram Filmed Entertainment acquired a 75% majority stake in the company. In 1998, because PolyGram was being purchased by Seagram (the then-parent company of Universal Pictures), the company was in talks to sell the stake back to Ian and Anne Miles and letting AHE trade independently again. In exchange, PolyGram Video would take over releasing Fun Song Factory videos.

In early 2000, AHE was acquired by Just Group PLC. Abbey's 'Tempo Pre-school' sub-label was retained for pre-school products, while 'at school' video and audio products were released under the Just Entertainment label. Abbey itself retained its special focus on the 'pre-school' and 'at school' age groups.

=== Just Group PLC ===
Just Group PLC was a British holding company that focused on incorporating the creation and development of character concepts, ownership of intellectual property rights, and international licensing and distribution of character and corporate brand merchandise. The company had its shares listed on the Alternative Investment Market (AIM) of the London Stock Exchange and was based in the town of Bakewell, Derbyshire, England, with additional offices in London, New York, Hong Kong and Melbourne.

The company operated many subsidiaries:

- Just Licensing – Licence holders for Just Group's properties.
- IPP – Focused on licensed merchandise and based in the company's Hong Kong offices.
- Monster Innovations Group (MIG) – Owned 50% of the "In my Pocket" trademark, which was acquired by Just in 1995.
- Wembley Sportsmaster Limited – Acquired by Just in 1998; it owned the "Wembley" football brand.

In the late 1990s, the company expanded into the entertainment industry and started producing animated television series. Its first series, Jellabies (also known as Jellikins in several countries, including the UK), proved sufficiently successful for CITV to commission a second series, which aired in 2000. The company expanded into the toy and print industries by forming Jusco Toys and acquiring book publisher Burghley Publishing, later renamed Just Publishing. Just also signed a deal with Warner Bros. Consumer Products to produce products based on their properties and renew an existing magazine publishing deal.

In 1999, Just Group acquired Pinky & Perky for £500,000, with the intention of producing a new television series and expanding into the North American market. The company later signed a deal with Carlton Television subsidiary Planet 24 in July 2001 to create a stage show and comedy series aimed at an adult audience and titled Pinky & Perky in Sex 'n' Drugs 'n' Bacon Roll.

In 1999, the company acquired Abbey Home Entertainment for $2.1 million, with the aim of focusing on the pre-school market. By the end of the year, the company had three shows in development: Wiki's World, set for an autumn 2000 release; One Big Happy Family, set for release in 2001 as a co-production with Jellabies producer Optical Image; and Butt-Ugly Martians, a co-production with Mike Young Productions and DCDC, set for a September 2000 release. With the purchase, Just expanded into home video in the United Kingdom and began releasing Abbey's content under their own brand, retaining the Tempo Pre-School sub-label for pre-school content.

In September 2000, Just fully acquired Optical Image for £1.5 million. In December, Just Group acquired MediaKey plc for £7.2 million.

In April 2001, it was confirmed that the company had failed to file accounts for the year. In August that year, the company laid off their CEO Wilf Shorrocks and commercial director Paula Shorrock and issued a shock profit warning. In the same month, the company showcased new projects at MIPCOM, including Wide-Eye, which was pre-sold to the BBC for release in autumn 2002, and several television specials. On October 16, Just closed their head office in Bakewell with the loss of 38 jobs, and was in talks on the sale of some non-core operations. The company also signed a deal with Universal Studios and subsidiary PolyGram Television to help manage Butt-Ugly Martians and allowing Universal to gain exclusive movie, home video (excluding Germany and the United Kingdom) and theme park rights to the property, as well as funding to produce more episodes. In November, the company's shares were suspended, due to lower-than-expected revenue from Butt-Ugly Martians and the failed purchase of MediaKey.

Just Group filed for administration on 9 January 2002 and the shares were delisted from Aim. On 12 June 2002, it was announced that format distributor Target was in talks to acquire and merge with the Just Group. However, nothing came from this after the initial announcement, with the JustAction Group instead putting together a company voluntary arrangement, which allowed the Just Group to exit administration in August 2002, rebranding as Newscreen Media Group PLC. The rescue plan eventually collapsed and Newscreen Media Group filed for administration again in 2004. The company soon folded, with its assets being shared between its management and newly formed business Think Entertainment PLC. The ownership of Jellikins and Butt-Ugly Martians is currently held by the Indian-based YoBoHo New Media Pvt. Ltd., the owners of the HooplaKidz YouTube media network.

=== Tempo Video ===
Another predecessor of Abbey Home Media was Tempo Video, which was originally launched by video distributor MSD Video in 1987 as a children's video label. After two years, MSD transitioned the distribution of Tempo to Collins Video and then transitioned the label to Abbey Home Entertainment in 1990, a year after the company was founded. Tempo Video was the mainstream video label for Abbey Home Entertainment and continued to be used until 2000, when the label was discontinued by AHE's new owner, Just Group.

The Tempo label was also used within Abbey-distributed audio cassettes, under labels including Tempo Audio, Tempo Twins, Tempo Reed and Tempo Children's Classics.

==== Tempo DIC Video ====
Tempo DIC Video was a joint venture with animation company DIC Entertainment. The label released DIC programmes on VHS.

=== Abbey Home Media ===
After Just Group filed for administration in 2002, Ian Miles formed a new company under the Abbey name called Abbey Home Media on 4 March 2002, re-acquiring former assets once owned by AHE. Abbey Home Media retained the Tempo Pre-School brand that Just Group kept during their ownership of the Abbey brands and would later introduce the Tempo and Tempo TV Classics (previously Tempo Classics) brands. During the 2010s, products were released under the regular Abbey Home Media brand name.

By 2016, distribution rights to much of Abbey's original catalogue were held by Hoho Entertainment.

In March 2017, the company signed a deal with DHX Media to release DVDs of Bob the Builder and Fireman Sam.

On 4 May 2020, it was confirmed that Anne Miles, the co-founder of Abbey, had died on 22 April, of the same year (her husband, Ian, died prior to his wife's death). A short while afterwards, the company's website was shut down and their Facebook page confirmed that the company had ceased operations due to "uncertain circumstances". Despite this, the company was still listed as "active" on Companies House until 13 December 2022 when Abbey was officially dissolved.

== Content ==
=== Television shows ===
Title	Year(s)	Network	Co-production with	Notes
Bump the Elephant	1990-1994	BBC1 (Children's BBC)	Bump Enterprises Ltd. Videal Produktions-GmbH	Series 2
Teddy Trucks	1994	BBC1 (Children's BBC)		
Enid Blyton's Enchanted Lands	1997-1998	BBC One (CBBC)	Cosgrove Hall Films; PolyGram Visual Programming	Under PolyGram
Fun Song Factory	1998	ITV (GMTV)	Tell-Tale Productions	Continuation of the 1994-1997 direct-to-video series
MacDonald's Farm	2000-2001	ITV (GMTV)	Jo Pullen Programming Ltd.	Under Just Entertainment
Wide-Eye	2003	CBeebies	King Rollo Films	

=== Television Specials ===
Title	Year(s)	Network	Co-production with	Notes
Lost In The Snow	2001	ITV (CITV)	Honeycomb Animation; Carlton Television	Under Just Entertainment

=== Direct-to-video programs ===
Title	Year(s)	Co-production with	Notes
Postman Pat's ABC Story	1990	Woodland Animations	
Postman Pat's 123 Story	1990	Woodland Animations	
Tell Me A Story: Volume 1	1990	N/A	
Tell Me A Story: Volume 2	1990	N/A	
Spot's Alphabet	1990	Salspot Ltd.	
Spot's Busy Year	1990	Salspot Ltd.	
Spot Learns to Count	1990	Salspot Ltd.	
Spot Tells the Time	1990	Salspot Ltd.	
The Enormous Crocodile	1990	N/A	Based on the Roald Dahl book of the same name
Revolting Rhymes	1990	N/A	Based on the Roald Dahl book of the same name
Dirty Beasts	1990	N/A	Based on the Roald Dahl book of the same name
The Magic Finger	1990	N/A	Based on the Roald Dahl book of the same name
A Golden Treasury of Nursery Rhymes	1991	N/A	
One, Two, Buckle My Shoe and Other Favourite Rhymes	1991	N/A	
Anytime Tales - Not Now, Bernard and Other Stories by David McKee	1991	King Rollo Films	
Anytime Tales - I Want a Cat and Other Stories by Tony Ross	1991	King Rollo Films	
One, Two, Buckle My Shoe And Other Favourite Rhymes	1992	Living Doll	Known as The Wheels on the Bus on DVD
Mr Men in the Great Alphabet Hunt	1992	Mister Films Ltd.	
A Day Full of Songs	1993	Music Box	
Paddington's Alphabet Treasure Hunt	1993	Living Doll	
Spot Looks at Colours	1994	King Rollo Films	
Spot Looks at Shapes	1994	King Rollo Films	
Spot Looks at Opposites	1994	King Rollo Films	
Spot's First Words	1994	King Rollo Films	
A Day Full of Fun	1994	Music Box	
First Fun with French	1994	Osbourne Publishing	
First Fun with Spanish	1994	Osbourne Publishing	
Read Along with Postman Pat	1994	Woodland Animations	Contains two stories: "Postman Pat's Sleepy Days" and "Postman Pat's Three Wishes"
Fun Song Factory	1994	Tell-Tale Productions	
A Day Full of Surprises and Songs	1995	Music Box	
A Day Full of Animals and Songs	1995	Music Box	
Fun Song Factory 2	1996	Tell-Tale Productions	
The Wonderful World of Nursery Rhymes	1996	Jo Pullen Productions Limited	
Party Time at the Fun Song Factory	1996	Tell-Tale Productions	
The Happy Birthday Video	1996	King Rollo Films	Under PolyGram
Bedtime Stories	1996	King Rollo Films	Under PolyGram
The Fun Song Factory at Old MacDonald's Farm	1996	Tell-Tale Productions	
Christmas at the Fun Song Factory	1996	Tell-Tale Productions	
Fun Song Factory: Fun and Games	1997	Tell-Tale Productions	
Fun Song Factory: Nursery Rhyme Land	1997	Tell-Tale Productions	
Wow! That's What I Call Nursery Rhymes	1999	Tell-Tale Productions	
Baby Bright	2000	Jo Pullen Programming	Under Just Entertainment
Wow! That's What I Call Christmas	2000	Tell-Tale Productions	Under Just Entertainment
Baby Bright 2	2001	N/A	Under Just Entertainment
A Day With Baby Bright	2006	Jo Pullen Programming	
Baby Bright and the Farm	2006	Jo Pullen Programming	

=== Other ===
- Butt-Ugly Martians
- SuperTed (now owned by Splash Entertainment)
