= Polly Parsons =

English television presenter (born 1984)

- Born: 15 February 1984 (age 42); Bristol, England
- Education: Elmhurst School for Dance
- Occupations: Television presenter actress glamour model
- Years active: 2004–present
- Television: Fun Song Factory; Genie in the House; The Real Hustle
- Spouse: Thomas Vermaelen (m. 2017)
- Partner: Sid Owen (2006–2012)
- Children: 2

Polly Parsons (born 15 February 1984) is an English television presenter.

== Early life ==
Parsons was born in Bristol, and attended Sacred Heart Convent Primary School and later Redland High School for Girls. She then gained A-Levels in Art, Drama and Dance and a Diploma in Performing Arts at Elmhurst School for Dance, Camberley.

== Career ==
Parsons co-presented Fun Song Factory as Paige with Laura Hamilton. She also appeared as Princess Sapphire in Genie in the House, Toonattik, and played Crystal in Disastrous for Nickelodeon. Later, she starred in Don't Get Screwed for BBC Three, and as Becky in Meet the Parents on E4. She was a presenter on BBC Three's The Real Hustle in 2012.

== Personal life ==
Parsons dated EastEnders actor Sid Owen for six years; the couple were engaged from 2009 to 2012. The year she and Owen parted, she began a relationship with footballer Thomas Vermaelen, with whom she has two sons. The couple married in June 2017.
