= Florrie's Dragons =

- Created by: An Vrombaut
- Written by: An Vrombaut
- Directed by: Sean Rogers
- Creative director: An Vrombaut
- Opening theme: "Wake Up Florrie's Dragons"
- Ending theme: "Wake Up Florrie's Dragons" (Instrumental)
- Countries of origin: United Kingdom; France; South Africa
- Original language: English
- No. of series: 1
- No. of episodes: 52

Production
- Executive producers: Helen Cadwallader; Sean Rogers
- Producers: Karina Stanford-Smith; Matthew Brown
- Running time: 8-9 minutes
- Production companies: Wish Films; Clockwork Zoo; Studio 100

Original release
- Network: Playhouse Disney
- Release: 7 September 2010 – 20 March 2011

Related
- 64 Zoo Lane

Florrie's Dragons (/floʊriː/) is a children's animated television series that was produced by Wish Films, Clockwork Zoo and Belgian entertainment production group Studio 100 and animated by Clockwork Zoo in South Africa. The series is based on a children's book named Dear Dragon. The series was created by An Vrombaut, the creator known from 64 Zoo Lane, which the series is related to. The series mainly aired on Disney Junior UK.

== Premise ==
The story of Princess Florrie, and her five dragons, help to solve a problem, and have ideas for and enchantment and modern creativity.

== Characters ==
- Princess Florrie (voiced by Lara Wollington) – The main character of the series. She is a little princess who lives in the castle. She has brown hair with freckles and fair skin, and wears a golden crown and a magenta dress surrounded by a yellow border with a pair of magenta shoes.
- Paprika (voiced by Felicity Duncan Smith) – The chef, who loves to bake things and even bakes for events.
- Ferdinand (voiced by Steve Edwin) - A king who loves to be in charge of the castle. He even makes a list for events.
- Casimir (voiced by John Vernon) - A wizard who loves to do magic and can make anything from the cauldron.
- Rattle – A tiny knight robot who makes rattling sounds every time he moves.

=== Dragons ===
- Dear Dragon (voiced by John Vernon) – Princess Florrie's sidekick and best friend. He can blow bubbles.
- Toot-Toot (voiced by John Vernon) – A dragon who can play a trumpet with his nose.
- Splish-Splash (voiced by Sara Powell) – A dragon who likes water and can make "pretty waves".
- Pom & Pom (voiced by Candida Gubbins) – The twin and cheerleader dragons.
- Zoom-Zoom (voiced by Steve Edwin) – A dragon who can fly super fast.

== Episodes ==
No.	Title	Written by	Original release date
1	"Whizzy Busy Bubbles"	Will Brenton	7 September 2010
Florrie and Dear Dragon have a long list of chores to do, but they find out a way to speed things up.
2	"The Water Ballet"	An Vrombaut	8 September 2010
The whole castle is delighted when Splish-Splash performs her very own enchanting ballet.
3	"A Dragon for Rattle"	Gillian Corderoy	9 September 2010
Rattle wants his own dragon. Each one tries to impress him but which will he choose?
4	"Sky Drawing"	Will Brenton	10 September 2010
Zoom-Zoom is jealous of Dear Dragon's bubble blowing abilities and challenges him to a picture drawing competition.
5	"Trouble in the Maze"	Will Brenton	12 September 2010
Florrie flings her bubble mix over the hedge and into a maze. Her friends try to find it, but they all get lost.
6	"The Grand Picnic"	Gillian Corderoy	13 September 2010
Florrie and Dear Dragon have made all the food for the Grand Picnic. However, the sandwiches are whisked away in a crowd of Dear Dragon's bubbles.
7	"Ferdinand's Grand Design"	Gillian Corderoy	14 September 2010
Ferdinand must cut a special hedge for Paprika, but he has run out of ideas. Florrie and Dear Dragon try to help him but accidentally breaks the hedge.
8	"Tickly Bubbles"	Will Brenton	15 September 2010
Florrie cheers up Dear Dragon by tickling him, giving him the idea of cheering everyone else up by tickling them with his bubbles. This soon becomes a problem when no one can finish their jobs.
9	"Can't Skate, Won't Skate"	Gillian Corderoy	20 September 2010
Florrie and The Poms are practising how to skate when Pom 1 accidentally crashes, causing her not to want to skate again.
10	"Toot-Toot's Surprise Band"	Will Brenton	25 September 2010
Toot-Toot creates a band out of the nature around him. Florrie and Dear Dragon join in but create too much noise for Ferdinand, who does not think music can be found everywhere.
11	"Queen for a Day"	Lauren Beukes	1 October 2010
Florrie pretends to be queen for the day and bosses her friends around, hurting their feelings.
12	"Hide and Seek"	Sam Wilson	5 October 2010
Florrie plays hide and seek with all her friends and finds them by following certain clues. But Rattle seems hard to find.
13	"Oopsy Bubbles"	Lauren Beukes	10 October 2010
Florrie and Dear Dragon accidentally break a special chandelier during the day of the Grand Ball.
14	"Bubbles Everywhere"	An Vrombaut	15 October 2010
Florrie and Dear Dragon play with some of Casimir's old junk, causing bubbles to fly all over the castle.
15	"Hat in the Sky"	An Vrombaut	18 October 2010
Florrie and Dear Dragon agree to help Paprika with the washing, but a strong wind causes Paprika's hat to fly away.
16	"The Soup Melon"	Sam Wilson	20 October 2010
Paprika plans to make some delicious soup from a melon, but Florrie and Dear Dragon accidentally break it after using it as a net in a tennis game.
17	"Hiccups"	Will Brenton	25 October 2010
Dear Dragon gets hiccups after swallowing one of his own bubbles. Things get worse when the bubbles spread, causing everyone else to catch the hiccups.
18	"Get Well Toot-Toot"	Gillian Corderoy	1 November 2010
Toot-Toot has got the Dragoon Droop, so Paprika confines him to the kitchen, even though he doesn't want to be kept inside. Florrie and Dear Dragon try to cure him by making some Dragon Droop Soup.
19	"Trumpet Bubbles"	An Vrombaut	5 November 2010
Toot-Toot tries to teach Florrie how to play the trumpet, but Florrie thinks she can't play any instruments.
20	"Bath Time, Dear Dragon"	Gillian Corderoy	10 November 2010
Florrie tries to persuade Dear Dragon to take a bath, so he can join the others in the Spring Fair.
21	"A Very Cherry Mystery"	Sam Wilson	15 November 2010
Florrie and Dear Dragon try to find out who is stealing all the cherries from the tree.
22	"Rattle-less Rattle"	Unknown	20 November 2010
Ferdinand and Florrie oil Rattle when his squeaks become too loud. This makes him no longer able to be heard, until Casimir has an idea.
23	"The Hot Air Balloon"	Sam Wilson	25 November 2010
Ferdinand creates a Hot Air Balloon from some cloth found in Casimir's room.
24	"Explorers"	Sam Wilson	30 November 2010
Florrie and Dear Dragon follow Casimir on an expedition to gather some jam from a raspberry jam volcano.
25	"The Pet Snoozle"	Gillian Corderoy	TBA
Florrie wants a pet and learns how to take care of them after a Snoozle comes into the castle after a leaf-collecting expedition.
26	"Swish-Splash"	Lauren Beukes	TBA
Florrie and Dear Dragon invite Splish-Splash to a game of bowls in the ballroom and try to help her after she slips on the sparkly clean floor.
27	"The Frog Dragon"	Lauren Beukes	TBA
Dear Dragon has a cold and Florrie asks Casimir to cure him. However, Casimir gets confused, turning Dear Dragon into a frog.
28	"Ferdinand Who?"	Sam Wilson	TBA
Ferdinand slips and bangs his head during some spoon-sorting and can't remember anything. Florrie and Dear Dragon try to find a special thing to help get his memory back.
29	"Treasure Hunt"	Lauren Beukes	TBA
Florrie gets a present delivered, but it is only a small piece of paper. She works out that it is a clue to some treasure and goes on a treasure hunt.
30	"The Pom Pom Club"	TBA	TBA
The Poms form their own club but won't let Florrie and Dear Dragon join. This makes Florrie and Dear Dragon form the Bubble Club.
31	"Lockweeds"	Lauren Beukes	TBA
Florrie goes flying with Zoom-Zoom to avoid picking Lockweeds with Ferdinand.
32	"The Bad Beard Day"	Lauren Beukes	TBA
Florrie offers to give Casimir a beard cut, but accidentally cuts too much off after Toot-Toot's music makes her sleepy.
33	"That's Not Florrie"	Sam Wilson	TBA
Paprika bans a sick Florrie from flying with Zoom-Zoom. She gets the idea to swap places with Dear Dragon after hearing about Little Red Riding Hood.
34	"A Home for Dear Dragon"	Gillian Corderoy	TBA
Dear Dragon is feeling sad, as all the dragons besides him have a hill they live in. He decides to try and live with the other dragons, making Florrie very sad.
35	"Zoom-Zoom's Control Roon"	Sam Wilson	TBA
Zoom-Zoom asks Florrie and Dear Dragon to run his control room. Everything goes well until some juice gets into Zoom-Zoom's eyes.
36	"The Thingymajiggy Box"	TBA	TBA
Casimir's room is full of surprises. Florrie tries to play with one of them, a small box that houses many big things inside of it.
37	"Singing Daisies"	Lauren Beukes	TBA
Every seven years, fireflies are wooed by the song of the singing daisies, in order for them to be pollinated. Toot-Toot tries to make the daisies sing one of his songs instead.
38	"Snoozeless in the Snoozlewood"	Lauren Beukes	10 January 2011
Dear Dragon's trumpet bubbles wake up the sleeping Snoozles. Florrie and her friends try different ways to put them to sleep, until Toot-Toot helps them find a solution.
39	"The Dragon Egg"	TBA	TBA
Florrie finds a huge egg-shaped stone, which she thinks is a dragon egg that is waiting to hatch.
40	"A Rainy Day"	Gillian Corderoy	TBA
Casimir goes out, leaving his spell book behind. Florrie tries to get rid of some rain clouds with a spell, causing trouble afterwards.
41	"Dance Dance Dance"	Lauren Beukes	TBA
Rattle learns a special dance for the Grand Ball. Dear Dragon wants to learn it too, but can't seem to get his feet to dance right. That is until Florrie comes up with a plan.
42	"Float Day"	Lauren Beukes	TBA
Florrie wants to fly like Zoom-Zoom and tries to, using a spell from Casimir's book. The spell causes the castle and its inhabitants to float, which seems fun at first, but Florrie doesn't know how to get her friends down.
43	"Raspberry Jam Volcano"	Sam Wilson	TBA
Dear Dragon eats all the cherry jam and there are no more cherries to make more with. Casimir, Florrie and Dear Dragon go to the raspberry jam volcano to get more jam, but when they get there, the jam has set.
44	"Florrie the Hero"	Sam Wilson	TBA
Florrie reads a book about various heroes and decides that she wants to be a superhero. But no matter how much she tries, her friends don't want her assistance.
45	"The Bubble Necklace"	TBA	TBA
Florrie borrows Splish-Splash's favorite pearl necklace to play dress-up with but breaks the elastic holding the necklace together breaks. Dear Dragon tries to help Florrie find the pearls.
46	"Florrie's Portrait"	Sam Wilson	TBA
Ferdinand must paint Florrie's portrait, but Florrie won't sit still and wants to play with bubbles.
47	"Disco Bubbles"	TBA	TBA
The Poms are having a disco at their place and Dear Dragon wants to join in. Dear Dragon gets sent away after playing the wrong music, but Florrie gets an idea to help Dear Dragon be part of the disco.
48	"Silly Sports Day"	TBA	TBA
The castle has a day to play some silly sports, which everyone likes. Zoom-Zoom tries to win every event, but when he doesn't, he spoils everyone's fun by making it rain.
49	"The Harpsicouch"	Lauren Beukes	TBA
Once a year, Toot-Toot tunes his magical instruments. But the Harpsicouch is proving tricky, causing chaos around the castle. Florrie has to be the one to tame it.
50	"The Grown-ups' Day Off"	TBA	TBA
Florrie decides that the grown-ups are too tired and need a day off, making her and the dragons look after the castle.
51	"Roll Up! Roll Up!"	TBA	TBA
Ferdinand has run out of ideas for some evening entertainment. Florrie and Dear Dragon go around the castle asking their friends for ideas.
52	"The Winter Ball"	TBA	TBA
The Winter Ball is one of the most magical times of year in the castle, with its sparkling tree and gift socks. But this year, the ball might be a disaster.

== Broadcast ==
The series was broadcast on Disney Junior in the United Kingdom, and returned on ITVBe's LittleBe Between 3 September 2018 and 29 August 2021, MiniMini+ in Poland, and KIKA in Germany. The series was dubbed in the Irish language (Gaeilge) by Dublin-based studios Macalla Teoranta for TG4, and is called Dragain Florrie in Irish. A Bangla dubbed version of the series was aired on Duronto TV in Bangladesh.
