= URBO: The Adventures of Pax Afrika =

- Genre: Science fiction
- Created by: Sean Rogers
- Starring: Anelisa Phewa; Nick Pauling; Precious Kofi; Mike Westcott; Cokey Falkow; Nicola Jackman; Siphokazi January
- Country of origin: South Africa
- No. of episodes: 104

Production
- Running time: 26 minutes
- Production companies: Emylarmatystudios; StoryBots Studios

Original release
- Network: SABC3; Emylarmatystudios TV
- Release: 28 October 2006

URBO: The Adventures of Pax Afrika is a South African science fiction animated television series created by the animation department of Octagon CSI, which later became Clockwork Zoo. It started airing in October 2006, and ran until November 2009. It chronicles the adventures of a gang of teenagers who live in a futuristic Cape Town, renamed iKapa City, the last known city on the planet, as they fight the evil industrialist overlord Maximilian Malice.

Pax Afrika, the son of the missing explorer Zingela Afrika, discovers that he has ancestral powers that allow him to see flashes of the future. Together with his friends, emo mechanic T-Man, hacker girl Keitu, and Una, Malice's rebellious daughter, Pax plans to find his father and save the city from Malice Industries. But his fate is also tied to the mysterious, hidden city of URBO - an environmental El Dorado located somewhere in the ruins of Africa.

The show's head writer was science fiction novelist Lauren Beukes.

SABC3 began airing the first 52-part series on 28 October 2006.

== Heroes ==
- Pax Afrika - A rebellious teenager who discovers that he has been granted magical powers by his ancestors. They include the power to control light and the weather, the ability to see the future, and lightning-fast reflexes.
- T-Man - Pax's best friend, an emo mechanic. He is an incredible coward with a dry wit.
- Keitu Anderson - A genius hacker girl with an inexplicable crush on T-Man.
- Una Malice - Maximilian Malice's rebellious daughter, who has been spoiled, but is a skilled hover-biker who can hold her own against Pax.
- Teeter - Pax's mischievous little sister, who has an X-ray eye and is obsessed with the TV show "Frothy The Bear".

== Villains ==
- Maximilian Malice - A former vacuum-cleaner salesman who stumbled upon the technology that made him the richest, most powerful person in the city.
- Clemence 2-X4b - Malice's bumbling side-kick and robotics expert. He was abandoned in a factory full of robot arms and raised as one of their own, and now finds it hard to deal with real people.
- Tumi Nyoka - Pax's nemesis, a psychopathic bully who quickly became head of Malice's army.
- Senyaka - One of Pax's ancestors, who grants Pax the power of mind control and manipulation. He is shunned by Pax's other ancestors in the spirit realm.
- The Happiness Enforcers - Malice's robot army. Most of them are addicted to the robot soap-opera The Newly Manufactured And The Restless

== Other Recurring Characters ==
- Frothy the Bear - A children's TV entertainer, reminiscent of Barney the Dinosaur. He teaches children the importance of buying products from the Malice Corporation.
- Mushu - Pax's mentor, who teaches him how to use his magical powers.
- Ma Afrika - Pax and Teeter's long-suffering mother.
- House - The home-management AI, MaliceSoft House 4.01 Beta. A bossy computer program that looks after Pax's house.
- Zakes Turbo - An egocentric, half-witted hoverbike champion with the best hair in the city.
- Chatta Kumalo - A vain, ultra-fashionable bionic reporter with a unicycle wheel instead of legs.
- Leon and Deon - T-Man's interchangeable twin brothers, who are mechanics.
- Stacy - Keitu's fashion-crazed sister.
