= Clockwork Zoo =

South African animation studio

Clockwork Zoo (PTY) Ltd.
- Logo used from 2010 to 2011
- Formerly: Octagon CSI
- Type: Private
- Industry: Animation; Live action
- Founded: 2005
- Defunct: 2011
- Fate: Closed
- Headquarters: Cape Town, South Africa
- Products: Television shows
- Website: clockworkzoo.com (archived 2011-08-24)

Clockwork Zoo (formerly Octagon CSI, styled as CLOCKWORK ZOO) was a South African animation studio that was active from 2005 until its closure in 2011.

After creating the local action-adventure teen show URBO: The Adventures of Pax Afrika, the company produced the animation for several international television series, including the fifth season of Caillou co-produced with Loogaroo Animation Studio, and the Cookie Jar Group, Mr. Baby for Xilam, and the Playhouse Disney series Florrie's Dragons, co-produced by Wish Films.

== History ==
=== 2005-2010: Early career ===
Clockwork Zoo was Africa's largest animation studio and home to several of South Africa's most prolific storytellers and content creators. Starting in 2005 with URBO: The Adventures of Pax Afrika, the young animation division quickly grew to 30 people, producing 104 half-hour episodes. After a move from local to more international work and a change from Flash to Toon Boom as preferred medium, the studio worked on Mr. Baby (Xilam, France), Happy Valley (Dinamo, Wales) and storyboards for Wibbly Pig (Wish Films, UK).

=== 2010-2011: Later career ===
In 2010, Clockwork Zoo co-produced 26 half-hour episodes for the 5th season of Caillou with Cookie Jar Entertainment (Canada), and Loogaroo Animation Studio (Canada) significantly raising the bar on previous seasons. The Caillou franchise has sold in every continent and made $40 million in sales so far.

In 2010, the company co-produced Florrie's Dragons with Wish Films (UK) for initial broadcast on the Disney Channel UK. The 52 x 10 min series about a princess and her 6 pet dragons has gained a great deal of attention, and Playhouse Disney were "thrilled" with the result. Clockwork Zoo provided development, design, script, storyboard, build, background, animatics, layout, animation and HD video post on Florrie's Dragons.

The company closed in 2011 and many of the employees formed Sea Monster Entertainment.

== Awards ==
The company won the prestigious 2010 Cape Film Commission Imbongi trophies in both Training & Development and Animation.
