= Wibbly Pig =

Picture book series by Mick Inkpen

Wibbly Pig is the title character of a series of picture books for young children, written and illustrated by English author and illustrator Mick Inkpen. The series is known for its simple storytelling, everyday themes, and digestibility for preschool audiences. It has also received recognition through children's reading lists and positive critical attention.

The series are generally published as "board books", books with thick cardboard pages which are easier for very young children to turn and also more durable and easier to clean than normal books. Some of the Wibbly Pig books also have activity features such as flaps which can be lifted to reveal additional art. Wibbly Pig is often accompanied by his favourite toys Pigley, Flop and Dimple. He carries a bunch of his friends he calls the "Fligley Imple".

== Author ==
Mick Inkpen is a British author and illustrator of children's books. His work often focuses on early childhood experiences and simple narrative styles, featuring short, clear sentences. Over the course of his career, he has received several honors, including the British Book Award and the Children's Book Award. Born on December 22, 1952, In Romford, Inkpen began his career as a graphic designer after finishing school. During that time, he met Nick Butterworth, who later became his longtime collaborator. Together, they went on to create many children's books. Inkpen's books are aimed at young readers and include the Wibbly Pig series, which is designed to be accessible and engaging for preschool-aged children.

== Book titles ==
- If I Had a Pig (1988)
- Wibbly Pig Can Make a Tent (1995)
- Wibbly Pig Is Happy (1995)
- Wibbly Pig Opens His Presents (1995)
- Everyone Hide from Wibbly Pig (1997)
- In Wibbly's Garden (1999)
- Wibbly Pig Likes Bananas (2000)
- Is It Bedtime Yet Wibbly Pig? (2004)
- Tickly Christmas Wibbly Pig! (2009)
- Wibbly Pig Likes Playing (2010)
- Wibbly Pig Likes Presents (2010)
- Wibbly Pig Likes to Have Fun (2010)
- Wibbly Pig Likes Dancing (2010)
- Wibbly Pig's Silly Big Bear (2010)
- Wibbly Pig Likes Pictures (2010)
- What Shall We Call Wibbly's Puppy? (2011)
- Oh No Wibbly Pig, Not a Rabbit! (2012)
- Don't Lose Pigley, Wibbly Pig! (2012)
- Wibbly Pig Has 10 Balloons (2014)
- Wibbly Pig Picks a Pet (2014)
- Wibbly Pig and the Tooky (2015)
- Wibbly Pig at the Zoo (2018)

== Themes/format ==
The Wibbly Pig books focus on everyday childhood experiences such as play, routines, and emotions, making them relatable for young children. Mick Inkpen's use of repetition and illustrations helps emphasize these moments, making daily activities easier for children to understand. The combination of the simple structure and familiar situations are intended to support early literacy development and engagement with reading.

== Reception ==
The Wibbly Pig series has received generally positive reviews from children's literature publications. A School Library Journal review described the books as appealing to very young readers and reflecting familiar childhood routines and experiences, such as getting dressed, bath time, and going to bed. Kirkus Reviews also evaluated titles in the series, contributing to its visibility in children's publishing and reinforcing its recognition among reviewers. Overall, the series has been noted for its simplicity and suitability for early readers.

== Television series ==
Wibbly Pig
- Based on: Wibbly Pig series by Mick Inkpen
- Directed by: Jez Hall
- Voices of: Liam Tully; Zoe Fraser; Heather Bambrick; Jacob Ewaniuk; Nathan Henry; Duncan Innes; Mark Ramsay
- Composers: Dave Howman; André Jacquemin; Paul Kissaun; Ashley Slater; Daisy Emily Warne
- Countries of origin: United Kingdom; Canada
- Original language: English

Production
- Executive producers: Steven Jarosz; Iain Lauchlan; Natalie Osborne; Kay Benbow
- Producers: Will Brenton; Helen Cadwallader; Vince Commisso
- Editor: Stephen Charles
- Production companies: Wish Films; 9 Story Entertainment

Original release
- Network: CBeebies
- Release: 7 September 2009 – 15 March 2010

Wibbly Pig is a fantasy animated children's television series by Wish Films and 9 Story Entertainment. The TV series was broadcast on CBeebies weekdays at 3:30pm (except Wednesdays) from Monday, 7 September 2009. The series premiered on PBS Kids Sprout with the new season of The Good Night Show, on August 27, 2012 in the United States, and it featured the characters redubbed with Canadian voice actors. It aired on Qubo from January 1, 2018 to February 26, 2021, with the original British voice cast instead of the Canadian one. In Canada, the series aired on TVOKids and Knowledge Kids.

Wibbly Pig is voiced by Liam Tully in Canada and by Macaulay Keeper in the UK, while Zoe Fraser is the voice of the narrator. Spotty Pig, Twin Pig 1, and Twin Pig 2 are voiced by Jacob Ewaniuk. Also, in the UK, most adult voices are by Yvette-Rosette Duncan, while others are provided by Teresa Gallegher.

A Welsh language version, titled 'Wibli Sochyn y Mochyn' was broadcast on S4C.

=== Audience ===
The series is designed for preschool and early primary-aged children and uses simple language and repetition to support reading development. The books are structured to be visually engaging and easy to follow, making them accessible to early readers.

=== Awards and recognition ===
The Wibbly Pig series was included on the 2005 Children's Choices list, which highlights books popular with young readers. This recognition indicates that the series was well received by its target audience and had strong appeal among children.
