= Jim Jam and Sunny =

- Genre: Children's television series Musical comedy
- Created by: Will Brenton; Iain Lauchlan
- Starring: Justin Fletcher; Emma Weaver; Esther Rose Collins; Adrian Edmeades; Cecily Fay; Emily Dormer; Iestyn Evans; Simon Feilder; Bob Golding; Matthew Lyons; Ashley Slater; Maxwell Laird; Morna Macpherson; Ellen Thomas
- Opening theme: "Jim Jam And Sunny Theme"
- Ending theme: "The Goodbye Song"
- Country of origin: United Kingdom
- Original language: English
- No. of episodes: 130 (260 segments)

Production
- Executive producers: For Entertainment Rights; Jane Smith; Mike Heap
- Producers: Alison Ray; Will Brenton (series); Iain Lauchlan (series)
- Running time: 11 minutes 22 minutes
- Production company: Wish Films

Original release
- Network: CITV Channel
- Release: 20 November 2006 – 27 June 2008

Jim Jam and Sunny is a British children's television programme that aired on the CITV channel. It was first aired on November 20, 2006 and ended on June 27, 2008.

== Premise ==
Jim Jam is 3, and his older sister Sunny is 5. Whenever they enter their magical room, the toys come to life, and they have many adventures together.

== Characters ==
=== Main characters ===
- Jim Jam: A 3-year-old boy. He has orange skin, blue hair and wears clothes with a moon motif. He is fascinated by everyday objects; he shares a strong bond with Nobby, and enjoys exploring and having fun.
- Sunny: Jim Jam's older sister, who is 5 years old. She has violet hair and yellow skin and wears clothes decorated with a sun motif. She is very protective of her little brother, Jim Jam; her favourite toy is Gigi, and enjoys painting and reading.

==== The toys ====
- Nobby: an energetic blue stuffed monkey with flowers on him, always looking for fun, dancing and singing.
- Mouth: A teal-and-red plush of a creature of an unknown species that resembles a cross between a frog and a jellyfish who's the smallest toy in the group and also the grumpy one, but definitely the loudest. He teaches his friends about the value of laughter.
- Gigi: a pink stuffed horse with white stars who's a graceful, considerate, and reliable friend to the group.
- Bot: a red toy robot with a built-in computer. He is keen to teach his friends new facts, and sometimes, he has silly ideas.
- Slim: an orange-and-yellow stuffed giraffe. Despite being a very loveable toy, he's always bumping into things, and he's also a great big scaredy cat.

== Episodes ==
No. in series	Title	Written by	Original release date
1	"Tiger"	Unknown	20 November 2006
Jim Jam believes that something that's orange with black stripes in the washing basket is a tiger.
2	"Dancing"	Kara Miller	21 November 2006
When Jim Jam and Nobby begin dancing, everyone else does too, but Slim is apprehensive about the idea.
3	"Dressing Up"	Kara Miller	22 November 2006
Sunny, as a princess, tells the story of how Cowboy Jim Jam helps stop a naughty pirate (Slim) and help out the Queen (Gigi) and an elf (Nobby).
4	"Truck"	Unknown	23 November 2006
Sunny isn't happy that Jim Jam and Nobby are messing up her shops with their toy trucks.
5	"Bed"	Unknown	24 November 2006
Jim Jam doesn't want to go to sleep, and finds it boring. Sunny and the toys show him that sleeping can take you anywhere.
