= Fun Song Factory =

- Logo for the 2004 series
- Genre: Children's television
- Created by: Will Brenton; Iain Lauchlan
- Presented by: Dave Benson Phillips; Iain Lauchlan; Sarah Davison; Michelle Durler; Katy Stephens; Alex Lovell; Justin Fletcher; Karl Woolley; Laura Hamilton; Chris Till; Aston Merrygold; Polly Parsons; Kerry Newell
- Voices of: Nick Mercer; Iain Lauchlan; Sally Preisig; Justin Fletcher; Jane H. Pickworth
- Country of origin: United Kingdom
- No. of episodes: 7 (DTV series); 24 (GMTV series); 52 (CITV series)

Production
- Producer: Tell-Tale Productions
- Running time: 50 mins (DTV series); 20 mins (GMTV Series); 10 mins (CITV Series)
- Production companies: Tell-Tale Productions; Abbey Broadcast Communications (Original DTV Videos and 1998 TV series); Entertainment Rights (2004 series)

Original release
- Network: ITV (CITV); ITV2 (CITV/GMTV)
- Release: 30 May 1998 – September 2004

Fun Song Factory is a British pre-school children's television and video series. It was originally created in 1994 by Will Brenton and Iain Lauchlan, who at the time were part of the Playdays production team. The series was produced through their studio Tell-Tale Productions and was originally released as a direct-to-video series through Abbey Home Entertainment (and later PolyGram Video)'s "Tempo-Pre-School" imprint.

== Format ==
The series centers around a factory where music is created. In the show, live presenters alongside children come inside and sing a number of nursery rhymes and other classic children's songs, which vary across each episode.

== Versions ==
=== Live shows ===
The show began as a series of direct-to-video features which were recorded in front of a live audience, similar to Scotland's The Singing Kettle series.

The first Fun Song Factory was released on 1 December 1994, and was released as part of a series of original straight-to-video content commissioned by Abbey Home Entertainment's Abbey Broadcast Communications subsidiary. It was filmed at the Polka Theatre in Wimbledon, presented by Iain Lauchlan, Sarah Davison and Dave Benson Phillips, a team of children known as the "Factory Workers", and costumed character versions of Postman Pat, Rupert Bear, SuperTed and Dusty the Dinosaur (an original character created by AHE) making special guest appearances.

Following the commercial success of the feature, Abbey commissioned Tell-Tale to produce a second feature, recorded at the Chickenshed Theatre in North London. Released on 5 January 1996, Fun Song Factory 2 was presented by Iain, Dave and Michelle Durler, with a new selection of factory workers, and Postman Pat, Rupert Bear and SuperTed returning as special guests.

Following the success of the second tape and the purchase of a stake in Abbey by PolyGram, several additional commissions were made. Party Time at the Fun Song Factory, released on 26 July 1996, began a transition to a standard format, featuring a permanent factory set, and a cast of original characters being added – A fully-costumed dog character named Ozzy Octave (voiced by Nick Mercer), the foreman of the Fun Song Factory, and the puppets Fred Fixer (voiced by Iain Lauchlan), Talking paint pots and Sally Cat (voiced by Sally Preisig). Iain, Sarah and Dave reprised their roles as presenters once again, and this would continue through to The Fun Song Factory at Old MacDonald's Farm (28 September 1996), Christmas at the Fun Song Factory (30 November 1996), Fun Song Factory – Fun and Games (24 September 1997), which featured Katy Stephens instead of Sarah Davison and special guest stars Postman Pat, SuperTed and Bump the Elephant, and Fun Song Factory – Nursery Rhyme Land (5 November 1997), featuring a special guest appearance from SuperTed.

All seven DTV volumes were reissued between 2001 and 2003 by Universal Pictures (UK) Ltd.

=== GMTV series (1998) ===
After the original 7 videos sold a combined total of 750,000 copies in the UK, GMTV commissioned a television series in 1998, consisting of twenty-three episodes. Dave Benson Phillips now became the main presenter, and appeared in every episode. Other presenters rotated from a selection of four – Katy Stephens, who previously appeared on Fun Song Factory: Fun and Games, Karl Woolley, a producer for Tell-Tale Productions who had also presented Playdays, Justin Fletcher, who made his television debut role in the series, and Alex Lovell, who also made her television debut.

Nick Mercer reprises his role as Ozzy Octave and also performed Old MacDonald in the episode "Farm Animals" (whom Lauchlan previously appeared as in The Fun Song Factory at Old MacDonald's Farm), Lauchlan would reprise the role of Fred and Preisig would reprise the role of Sally, The paint pots would also return. A new character, a talking factory hooter named Hooter (voiced by Lauchlan) was introduced.

The GMTV series was nominated for a BAFTA in 1998.

==== Episodes ====
No.	Title	Directed by	Written by	Original release date
1	"Birthdays"	Robin Carr	Iain Lauchlan and Will Brenton	30 May 1998
Ozzy helps hold a birthday party for Fred. Presenters: Dave Benson Phillips, Katy Stephens & Justin Fletcher; Guest: Karl Woolley Children: Alice Connor, Jade Jeffries, Mikayla Jones, Jamie Meyer & Mirren McLeod
2	"Sounds"	Robin Carr	Iain Lauchlan and Will Brenton	6 June 1998
Hooter is making all sorts of random sounds. Presenters: Dave Benson Phillips, Alex Lovell & Justin Fletcher Children: Dayle Hodge, Elizabeth Roberts, Mirren McLeod, William Stokes & Alex Pooley
3	"Big and Small"	Will Brenton	Iain Lauchlan and Will Brenton	13 June 1998
The children make large and small friends with each other with help from Ozzy and help Sally overcome her fear of mice. Presenters: Dave Benson Phillips & Katy Stephens Children: Kizzi Carnegie, Myles Anderson, Jenny Cachero, Alice Connor & Jade Chaston
4	"Farm Animals"	Will Brenton	Iain Lauchlan and Will Brenton	20 June 1998
Old MacDonald visits the factory. Presenters: Dave Benson Phillips, Alex Lovell & Nick Mercer Children: Isabella Cheevers, Jamie Meyer, Mikayla Jones, Amber Charles & Francesca Baldwin
5	"Numbers"	Robin Carr	Iain Lauchlan and Will Brenton	27 June 1998
The children and the presenters sing all sorts of counting songs. Presenters: Dave Benson Phillips, Justin Fletcher & Alex Lovell Children: Kizzi Carnegie, Myles Anderson, Jenny Cachero, Alice Connor & Jade Chaston
6	"Please and Thank You"	Will Brenton	Iain Lauchlan and Will Brenton	4 July 1998
Everybody is being polite and caring on Good Manners Day. Presenters: Dave Benson Phillips & Justin Fletcher Children: Isabella Cheevers, Jamie Meyer, Mikayla Jones, Amber Charles & Francesca Baldwin
7	"Picnic Time"	Will Brenton	Iain Lauchlan and Will Brenton	11 July 1998
Will the weather dampen Ozzy's surprise for the children? Presenters: Dave Benson Phillips & Katy Stephens Children: Dayle Hodge, Mirren McLeod, William Stokes, Marlee Whitlock, Amber Charles & Elizabeth Roberts
8	"Helping"	Will Brenton	Iain Lauchlan and Will Brenton	18 July 1998
Ozzy is extra busy today, so he asks everybody to help him out at the Factory. Presenters: Dave Benson Phillips, Katy Stephens & Karl Woolley Children: Isabella Cheevers, Jamie Meyer, Mikayla Jones, Amber Charles & Francesca Baldwin
9	"Heads, Shoulders, Knees and Toes"	Will Brenton	Iain Lauchlan and Will Brenton	25 July 1998
The crew show off what our bodies can do. Presenters: Dave Benson Phillips, Katy Stephens & Justin Fletcher Children: Kizzi Carnegie, Jamie Meyer, Sapphire Elia, Myles Anderson, Jenny Cachero & Caroline Ward
10	"Colours"	Will Brenton	Iain Lauchlan and Will Brenton	1 August 1998
Ozzy and the crew show off the wonderful colours of the rainbow. Presenters: Dave Benson Phillips, Katy Stephens & Justin Fletcher Children: Dayle Hodge, Elizabeth Roberts, Mirren McLeod, William Stokes & Alex Pooley
11	"Collywobbles"	Will Brenton	Iain Lauchlan and Will Brenton	8 August 1998
Strange sounds are coming through the factory and Dave wonders if it's the "Collywobbles" to blame. Presenters: Dave Benson Phillips & Karl Woolley Children: Kizzi Carnegie, Jamie Meyer, Sapphire Elia, Myles Anderson, Jenny Cachero & Caroline Ward
12	"Hide and Seek"	Will Brenton	Iain Lauchlan and Will Brenton	15 August 1998
Everyone is playing Hide and Seek which leads to Mirren getting lost. Plus, there are quite a few surprises in store! Presenters: Dave Benson Phillips, Katy Stephens & Karl Woolley Children: Dayle Hodge, Mirren McLeod, William Stokes, Marlee Whitlock, Amber Charles & Elizabeth Roberts
13	"Making Friends"	Will Brenton	Iain Lauchlan and Will Brenton	22 August 1998
Everybody shows ways on how to become a good friend. Presenters: Dave Benson Phillips, Katy Stephens & Justin Fletcher Children: Kizzi Carnegie, Jamie Meyer, Sapphire Elia, Myles Anderson, Jenny Cachero & Caroline Ward
14	"Senses"	Will Brenton	Iain Lauchlan and Will Brenton	29 August 1998
The crew shows different ways on how to use their senses. Presenters: Dave Benson Phillips, Katy Stephens & Karl Woolley Children: Kizzi Carnegie, Myles Anderson, Jenny Cachero, Alice Connor & Jade Chaston
15	"Music"	Robin Carr	Iain Lauchlan and Will Brenton	5 September 1998
As usual, the crew show off the different kinds of music that can be played in the factory. Presenters: Dave Benson Phillips, Katy Stephens & Justin Fletcher Children: Alice Connor, Jade Jeffries, Mikayla Jones, Jamie Meyer & Mirren McLeod
16	"Creepy Crawlies"	Robin Carr	Iain Lauchlan and Will Brenton	12 September 1998
Creepy Crawlies are all throughout the factory today! Presenters: Dave Benson Phillips & Alex Lovell Children: Myles Anderson, Jenny Cachero, Jade Chaston, Isabella Cheevers & Elizabeth Roberts
17	"Wild Animals"	Robin Carr	Iain Lauchlan and Will Brenton	19 September 1998
Professor Plimsoll and Arnold the Orangutan visit the factory, and it goes a bit wild with them! Presenters: Dave Benson Phillips, Katy Stephens & Justin Fletcher Children: Kizzi Carnegie, Yasmin Hickson, Dayle Hodge, William Stokes & Caroline Ward
18	"Times of the Day"	Robin Carr	Iain Lauchlan and Will Brenton	26 September 1998
The crew learn how to tell the time. Presenters: Dave Benson Phillips, Alex Lovell & Justin Fletcher; Children: Myles Anderson, Jenny Cachero, Jade Chaston, Isabella Cheevers & Elizabeth Roberts Note: Katy Stephens is credited instead of Alex Lovell in the credits.
19	"Transport"	Will Brenton	Iain Lauchlan and Will Brenton	3 October 1998
Everybody travels through various modes of transport. Presenters: Dave Benson Phillips & Alex Lovell Children: Kizzi Carnegie, Myles Anderson, Jenny Cachero, Alice Connor & Jade Chaston
20	"Water"	Robin Carr	Iain Lauchlan and Will Brenton	10 October 1998
Ozzy shows the crew how amazing water can be. Presenters: Dave Benson Phillips & Alex Lovell Children: Alice Connor, Jade Jeffries, Mikayla Jones, Jamie Meyer & Mirren McLeod
21	"Seasons"	Will Brenton	Iain Lauchlan and Will Brenton	17 October 1998
The crew learn about the four seasons in a year. Presenters: Dave Benson Phillips, Justin Fletcher & Katy Stephens Children: Dayle Hodge, Mirren McLeod, William Stokes, Marlee Whitlock, Amber Charles & Elizabeth Roberts
22	"Letters and Words"	Robin Carr	Iain Lauchlan and Will Brenton	24 October 1998
The crew learn about the letters of the alphabet. Presenters: Dave Benson Phillips & Katy Stephens Children: Kizzi Carnegie, Yasmin Hickson, Dayle Hodge, William Stokes & Caroline Ward
23	"People Who Help"	Robin Carr	Iain Lauchlan and Will Brenton	31 October 1998
The kinds of humans who help us visit the factory. Presenters: Dave Benson Phillips, Alex Lovell & Karl Woolley Children: Myles Anderson, Jenny Cachero, Jade Chaston, Isabella Cheevers & Elizabeth Roberts
24	"Shapetastic"	Robin Carr	Iain Lauchlan and Will Brenton	1998
Ozzy and the gang learn all about shapes. Presenters: Dave Benson Phillips, Alex Lovell & Karl Woolley Children: Dayle Hodge, Elizabeth Roberts, Mirren McLeod, William Stokes & Alex Pooley

=== CITV series (2004) ===
In 2004, CITV commissioned Tell-Tale Productions to create a rebooted version of the series, consisting of 52 10-minute episodes. Following Tell-Tale's purchase by Entertainment Rights in September 2004, the rebooted series went under the ER umberella.

The 2004 series was formatted similarly to other children's music shows like Hi-5, where in addition to the show's action songs, every episode featured a pop song. The 2004 series also ditched using presenters, instead using a cast of characters with acting names who appeared in every episode: Melody (Laura Hamilton), OJ and Cookie (Chris Till and Aston Merrygold, the latter being later part of the boyband JLS), Paige (Polly Parsons) and Cal (Kerry Newell).

Ozzy Octave and the paint pots were the only characters who returned for the 2004 series, with Ozzy now voiced by Justin Fletcher. A new character was also introduced, Ozzy's nephew named Harry (voiced by Jane H. Pickworth).

==== Episodes ====
1. Jungle in the Jumble
2. Number 10
3. Important People
4. Noise
5. Scared
6. Friends
7. Teddy Day
8. Bed Time
9. Energy
10. Under the Sea
11. Happy
12. Colours
13. Rain
14. One
15. In the Garden
16. Strange People
17. Boats
18. Under
19. In the Town
20. Christmas
21. Birds
22. Soft
23. Hands
24. Mice
25. Favourite Songs
26. Kings and Queens
27. How Do You Feel?
28. Songs to Please Cal
29. Songs to Please OJ
30. Songs to Please Cookie
31. Songs to Please Melody
32. Songs to Please Paige
33. Transport
34. In the Sky
35. Hot
36. Favourite Food
37. Words
38. Tiny Creatures
39. Blue
40. Snow
41. Sad
42. Spiders
43. In the Countryside
44. Yellow
45. Things That Grow
46. Cats and Dogs
47. Up and Down
48. Two
49. Sailors
50. Fun Song Farm
51. Five
52. Easter

==== Live show ====
In 2006, a live show produced by Imagine Theatre (under license from Entertainment Rights) featuring the cast toured theatres across the United Kingdom. The show featured brand new songs that were not heard in the TV series. A series of shows performed at Butlins holiday parks in June 2008 featured Dave Benson Phillips and Emma Quintin as presenters.

==== DVD releases ====
In the United Kingdom, a double-VHS/DVD release of the series, titled "Favourite Songs"/"Farm" was released by Universal Pictures (UK) Ltd (through Right Entertainment) in August 2005. Containing twelve episode altogether.

In Singapore, HVN Entertainment released thirteen 4-episode DVD and VCD volumes of the series that made up the entire series. The volumes were titled "In the Countryside", "Songs to Please", "In the Town", "Things That Grow", "Transport", "Birds", "Sailors", "Words", "Kings & Queens", "Energy", "Important People", "In the Garden" and "Friends".

==== Album ====
In 2006, an album containing several action songs from the show was released by Demon Music Group under their "Little Demon" imprint and Right Records, titled "Songsational".

=== Magical Musical Market ===
In 2019 creator and original presenter Iain Lauchlan produced a new series titled "Magical Musical Market" for his production company "Checky Chimps TV". The show is designed to fit a similar format as Fun Song Factory itself but instead is set in a market. Lauchlan presents each episode along with two children. The children visit a different stall and meet its owner (played by Lauchlan) and then sing a song related to an item being sold. At the beginning of each episode Lauchlan and the children must sing a song in order for the market to open. Many of the songs featured were carried over from Fun Song. Episodes were also broadcast on its official YouTube channel.
