= John Loder (actor) =

British actor (1898–1988)

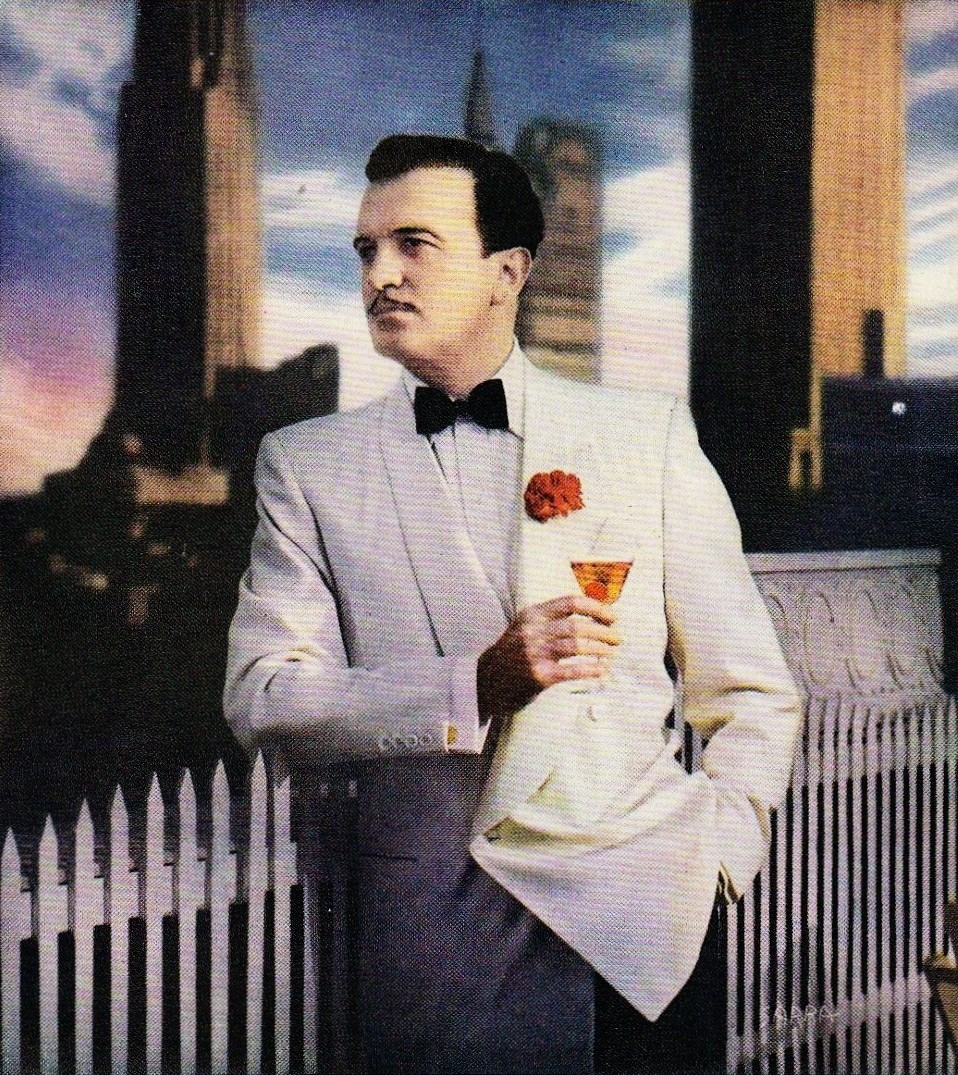
- Loder in 1949
- Born: William John Muir Lowe; 3 January 1898; London, England
- Died: 26 December 1988 (aged 90); London, England
- Occupation: Actor
- Years active: 1925–1971
- Spouses: Sophie Kabel (m. 1925; div. 19??); Micheline Cheirel (m. 1936; div. 1941) Hedy Lamarr (m. 1943; div. 1947) Evelyn Auff Mordt (m. 1949; div. 1955) Alba Julia Lagomarsino (m. 1958; div. 1972)
- Children: 5
- Father: William Lowe
- Relatives: Hilary Tindall (daughter-in-law)

John Loder (born William John Muir Lowe; 3 January 1898 – 26 December 1988) was established as a British film actor in Germany and Britain, before migrating to the United States in 1928 for work in the new talkies. He worked in Hollywood for two periods, becoming an American citizen in 1947. After living also in Argentina, he became a naturalized Argentine citizen in 1959.

== Biography ==
=== Early life ===
Loder was born in 1898 in Knightsbridge, London. His father was W.H.M. Lowe, a career British Army officer who achieved the rank of general. Patrick Pearse, the leader of the 1916 Easter Rising in Dublin, Ireland, surrendered to him. Both were present at the surrender.

=== World War I ===
Loder followed his father into the British Army, being commissioned into the 15th Hussars as a second lieutenant on 17 March 1915, during the First World War.

He was taken prisoner by the Germans on 21 March 1918 at the village of Roisel and transported to Le Cateau gaol and then by train to the first of several prisoner-of-war camps, Rastatt, in Baden, Germany.

=== Germany ===
Leaving the cavalry, Loder went into business with a German friend, Walter Becker, establishing a pickle factory in Potsdam. Later he began to develop an interest in acting. He appeared at the British Theatre Guild in Berlin and enjoyed success in productions of The Last of Mrs Cheyney, which had opened in London in 1925, and Loyalties.

He began appearing in bit parts in a few German films produced at the Tempelhof Film Studios including Dancing Mad (1925). He had a good part in Madame Wants No Children (1926), directed by Alexander Korda before going on to appear in numerous films in the next two years: The Last Waltz, The White Spider, The Great Unknown, all in 1927; and Alraune, Fair Game, When the Mother and the Daughter, Casanova's Legacy, The Sinner, and Adam and Eve, all released in 1928.

=== British films ===
Loder left Germany to return briefly to the United Kingdom. He had a support role in The First Born (1928), playing Madeleine Carroll's love interest. That year he sailed to the United States on the SS Île de France, bound for Hollywood to try his luck in the new medium of "talkies".

=== First period in Hollywood ===
Loder was signed by Paramount Studios. He appeared in The Case of Lena Smith (1929) directed by European Josef Von Sternberg. He made The Doctor's Secret (1929), Paramount's first talking picture, playing Ruth Chatterton's leading man. He appeared opposite Jack Holt in a Western, Sunset Pass (1929). But his very English persona in these roles did not win over viewers in the United States.

He also appeared in Black Waters (1929), the first British talkie, which was made in the US by producer Herbert Wilcox, and The Unholy Night (1929) at MGM. Loder made some for Pathe: Her Private Affair (1929), The Racketeer (1929), and Rich People (1930).

Alexander Korda had also moved to Hollywood and cast Loder in Lilies of the Field (1930). This was produced by Warners studio, which also used Loder in The Second Floor Mystery (1930), Sweethearts and Wives (1930), The Man Hunter (1930) (a Rin Tin Tin film), and One Night at Susie's (1931). He went to Fox studios for Seas Beneath (1931) directed by John Ford. That year he also appeared in a film for Hal Roach at MGM, On the Loose (1931).

=== Return to Britain ===
Loder returned to Britain. He starred in a comedy for Herbert Wilcox, Money Means Nothing (1932), and was reunited with Korda in Wedding Rehearsal (1933).

Loder pursued Merle Oberon in The Battle (1933) and had the star role in Money for Speed (1933) opposite Ida Lupino. He was in You Made Me Love You (1933), and that year had a small part in Korda's hugely successful The Private Life of Henry VIII (1933), playing the love interest of Elsa Lanchester's Anne of Cleeves.

Loder had lead roles in low-budget, quota quickies such as Paris Plane (1933) and Rolling in Money (1934) as well as the romantic male lead in the Gracie Fields vehicle, Love, Life and Laughter (1934).

Loder specialised in leading man parts in Warn London (1934); Java Head (1934) with Anna May Wong; Sing As We Go (1934) with Fields again, and a big hit; My Song Goes Round the World (1934); Lorna Doone (1934), as John Ridd; and 18 Minutes (1935).

He was top billed in The Silent Passenger (1935) and It Happened in Paris (1935) and supported in the Mozart biopic, Whom the Gods Love (1936). Loder was reunited with Gracie Fields in Queen of Hearts (1936) and starred in an IRA drama, Ourselves Alone (1936). He had a part in Guilty Melody (1936) and supported Boris Karloff in The Man Who Changed His Mind (1936).

Loder played the heroic investigator in Alfred Hitchcock's Sabotage (1936), replacing Robert Donat before taking on the role of Sir Henry Curtis, the male romantic interest in the 1937 original film version of King Solomon's Mines, romancing Anna Lee.

He was the romantic interest for Margaret Lockwood in Doctor Syn (1937), supporting George Arliss. He and Anna Lee were reunited in Non-Stop New York (1937), and he took on Erich von Stroheim in Under Secret Orders (1937).

Loder and Lockwood were paired again in Owd Bob (1938), before he went to France to appear in Katia (1938) with Danielle Darrieux, in which he played Alexander II of Russia.

He returned to Britain and starred in thrillers Anything to Declare? (1939), The Silent Battle (1939) with Rex Harrison, and Murder Will Out (1939). He had the title role in Meet Maxwell Archer (1940).

=== Return to Hollywood ===
After Britain entered the Second World War, Loder returned to the United States. He coasted into a career in B movie roles, usually playing upper-crust characters. He also played one role onstage on Broadway, in 1947's For Love or Money opposite June Lockhart.

He was in Adventure in Diamonds (1940) and Diamond Frontier (1940). At 20th Century Fox he made Tin Pan Alley (1940), Scotland Yard (1941), and How Green Was My Valley (1941), in which he played a brother of Roddy McDowall's character.

He also worked in such war films as Confirm or Deny (1941), One Night in Lisbon (1941), and Eagle Squadron (1941).

=== Warner Bros. ===
In Now, Voyager (1942), he played a wealthy widower engaged to Bette Davis's character. That was made by Warners who used Loder in Gentleman Jim (1942) as Errol Flynn's love rival. Warners gave him a then-rare lead in a B move, The Gorilla Man (1943), The Mysterious Doctor (1943), Murder on the Waterfront (1943), and Adventure in Iraq (1943).

He was back with Bette Davis in Old Acquaintance (1943) and supported Humphrey Bogart in Passage to Marseille (1944).

In the early 1940s, Loder was host of Silver Theater, a dramatic anthology on CBS radio. He also starred in the programme's 11 June 1944 episode.

=== Freelance ===
Loder freelanced as an actor. He had support roles in The Hairy Ape (1944), and Abroad with Two Yanks (1944), then had a lead part in some B films: The Brighton Strangler (1945), Jealousy (1945), A Game of Death (1945) (a remake of The Most Dangerous Game), and The Wife of Monte Cristo (1946).

He supported in an A film, One More Tomorrow (1946) and appeared opposite then-wife Hedy Lamarr in Dishonored Lady (1947). Loder then appeared in a minor Broadway hit in For Love or Money (1947–48). Around this time he began to focus increasingly on business as opposed to acting.

=== Later career ===
Loder's later film appearances included British films The Story of Esther Costello (1957), Small Hotel (1957), and Gideon's Day (1958). His last film was The Firechasers (1971).

== Personal life, marriages and children ==
Loder was married five times; two of his wives were actresses.

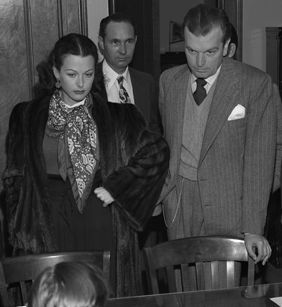
Hedy Lamarr and Loder in 1946

- He first married Sophie Kabel, in Berlin. They were not yet married when their son, Robin, was born. The boy followed his father to Eton and served in the Grenadier Guards. He later became a theatrical and literary agent, and was married three times. Robin Lowe married to British actress Hilary Tindall (1938–1992). She played Ann Hammond in the 1970s BBC TV series The Brothers.
- Secondly, French star Micheline Cheirel (married 1936–41) who later married Paul Meurisse). Micheline and Loder had one daughter together, Danielle.
- Thirdly, Austrian-American actress Hedy Lamarr in the United States (married 1943–47). He and Lamarr had two children together: Denise (b.1945) and Anthony Loder (1947-2023). Loder also adopted Lamarr's son from her previous marriage, James Lamarr Loder (b.1939). Throughout her life, Lamarr claimed that her first son, James, was not biologically related to her; he was adopted during her marriage to Gene Markey. However, years later, her son found documentation that he was the out-of-wedlock son of Lamarr and Loder. A later DNA test proved him not to be biologically related to either.
- Fourthly, Evelyn Carolan (divorced 1955)
- Fifthly, Alba Julia Lagomarsino from Argentina, said to be an heiress, in 1958. After their marriage, he lived on her 25,000-acre cattle ranch and spent much time at the Jockey Club in Buenos Aires. After they divorced in 1972, Loder returned to London. He resided for some years in a house opposite Harrods department store.

In 1932 Loder was named in the divorce proceedings of Wanda Holden and Charles Baillie-Hamilton, a former MP.

== Later years ==
In 1947, as Loder had become an American citizen, in 1959, he became a naturalised citizen of the United Kingdom. Given his varied residencies, he had been considered of "uncertain nationality" by that time.

He published his autobiography, Hollywood Hussar, in 1977. Loder's general health deteriorated in his eighties, and he was admitted in 1982 to the Distressed Gentlefolks Aid Association's Nursing Home in Vicarage Gate, Kensington. He went weekly by taxi to his London club, 'Bucks', in Mayfair, for luncheon. He died in London, aged 90, in 1988.

== In popular culture ==
Loder is the focus of the play The Private View: Fairytales of Ireland 1916–2016, written by Trevor White and directed by Gerard Stembridge. The play was staged by The Little Museum of Dublin as part of the Dublin Theatre Festival in October 2015, and was performed at the American Irish Historical Society in November of the same year.

== Filmography ==
- Dancing Mad (1925) as Dance extra (uncredited)
- Madame Wants No Children (1926) as Dancer (uncredited)
- The Last Waltz (1927)
- The White Spider (1927) as Lord Gray
- The Great Unknown (1927) as Dr. Ralf Hallam
- Alraune (1928) as Der Vicomte
- Fair Game (1928) as Oberleutnant von Rohnstedt
- When the Mother and the Daughter (1928)
- Casanova's Legacy (1928)
- The Sinner (1928) as Armand
- The First Born (1928) as Lord David Harborough
- Adam and Eve (1928)
- The Case of Lena Smith (1929) (uncredited)
- The Doctor's Secret (1929) as Hugh Paton
- Sunset Pass (1929) as Ashleigh Preston
- Black Waters (1929) as Charles
- The Unholy Night (1929) as Capt. Dorchester
- Her Private Affair (1929) as Carl Weild
- Love, Live and Laugh (1929) as Dr. Price
- The Racketeer (1929) as Jack Oakhurst
- Rich People (1929) as Captain Danforth
- Lilies of the Field (1930) as Walter Harker
- The Second Floor Mystery (1930) as Fraser-Freer's Younger Brother
- The Man Hunter (1930) as George Castle
- Sweethearts and Wives (1930) as Sam Worthington
- One Night at Susie's (1930) as Hayes
- Are You There? (1930) as Bit Role (uncredited)
- Seas Beneath (1931) as Franz Shiller
- On the Loose (1931, short) as Mr. Loder
- Money Means Nothing (1932) as Earl Egbert
- Wedding Rehearsal (1932) as John Hopkins aka Bimbo
- La bataille (1933) as Herbert Fergan
- Money for Speed (1933) as Mitch
- You Made Me Love You (1933) as Harry Berne
- The Private Life of Henry VIII (1933) as Peynell
- Paris Plane (1933)
- Rolling in Money (1934) as Lord Gawthorpe
- Love, Life and Laughter (1934) as Prince Charles
- Thunder in the East (1934) as Fergan
- Warn London (1934) as Inspector Yorke / Barraclough
- Java Head (1934) as Gerrit Ammidon
- Sing As We Go (1934) as Hugh Phillips
- My Song Goes Round the World (1934) as Rico
- Lorna Doone (1934) as John Ridd
- 18 Minutes (1935) as Trelawney
- The Silent Passenger (1935) as John Ryder
- It Happened in Paris (1935) as Paul
- Whom the Gods Love (1936) as Prince Lobkowitz
- Queen of Hearts (1936) as Derek Cooper
- Ourselves Alone (1936) as Captain Wiltshire
- Guilty Melody (1936) as Richard Carter
- The Man Who Changed His Mind (1936) as Dick Haslewood
- Sabotage (1936) as Sergeant Ted Spencer
- King Solomon's Mines (1937) as Sir Henry Curtis
- Doctor Syn (1937) as Denis Cobtree
- Non-Stop New York (1937) as Inspector Jim Grant
- Under Secret Orders (1937) as Lt. Peter Carr
- Owd Bob (1938) as David Moore
- Katia (1938) as Le tsar Alexandre II
- Peace on the Rhine (1938) as Émile Scheffer
- Anything to Declare? (1938) as Capt. Rufus Grant
- The Silent Battle (1939) as Bordier
- Murder Will Out (1939) as Dr. Paul Raymond
- Threats (1940) as Dick Stone
- Meet Maxwell Archer (1940) as Maxwell Archer
- Adventure in Diamonds (1940) as Michael Barclay
- Diamond Frontier (1940) as Dr. Charles Clayton
- Tin Pan Alley (1940) as Reggie Carstair
- Scotland Yard (1941) as Sir John Lasher
- One Night in Lisbon (1941) as Cmdr. Peter Walmsley
- How Green Was My Valley (1941) as Ianto
- Confirm or Deny (1941) as Captain Lionel Channing
- Eagle Squadron (1942) as Paddy Carson
- Now, Voyager (1942) as Elliot Livingston
- Gentleman Jim (1942) as Carlton De Witt
- The Gorilla Man (1943) as Captain Craig Killian
- The Mysterious Doctor (1943) as Sir Henry Leland
- Murder on the Waterfront (1943) as Lt. Cmdr. Holbrook
- Adventure in Iraq (1943) as George Torrence
- Old Acquaintance (1943) as Preston Drake
- Passage to Marseille (1944) as Manning
- The Hairy Ape (1944) as Tony Lazar
- Abroad with Two Yanks (1944) as Aussie Sgt. Cyril North
- The Brighton Strangler (1945) as Reginald Parker / Edward Grey
- Jealousy (1945) as Dr. David Brent
- A Game of Death (1945) as Don Rainsford
- Woman Who Came Back (1945) as Dr. Matt Adams
- The Fighting Guardsman (1946) as Sir John Tanley
- The Wife of Monte Cristo (1946) as De Villefort, Prefect of Police
- One More Tomorrow (1946) as Owen Arthur
- Dishonored Lady (1947) as Felix Courtland
- The Story of Esther Costello (1957) as Paul Marchant
- Small Hotel (1957) as Mr. Finch
- Woman and the Hunter (1957) as Mitchell Gifford
- Gideon's Day (1958) as The Duke
- The Secret Man (1959) as Maj. Anderson
- Allá donde el viento brama (1963)
- The Firechasers (1971) as Routledge (final film role)
