= Heads We Go =

1933 film

- Directed by: Monty Banks
- Written by: Victor Kendall; Fred Thompson
- Produced by: John Maxwell
- Starring: Constance Cummings; Frank Lawton; Binnie Barnes
- Cinematography: Jack E. Cox
- Edited by: Bert Bates
- Production company: British International Pictures
- Distributed by: Wardour Films
- Release date: July 1933
- Running time: 86 minutes
- Country: United Kingdom
- Language: English

Heads We Go (U.S. title: The Charming Deceiver) is a 1933 British comedy film directed by Monty Banks and starring Constance Cummings, Frank Lawton and Binnie Barnes. It was produced at Elstree Studios by British International Pictures.

The film's sets were designed by Duncan Sutherland.

== Plot ==
Finding herself mistaken for Hollywood star Dorothy Kay, impoverished model Betty Smith poses as Kay in a foolhardy scheme concocted by newspaper heir Toby Tyrrell.

== Cast ==
- Constance Cummings as Betty Smith / Dorothy Kay
- Frank Lawton as Toby Tyrrell
- Binnie Barnes as Lil Pickering
- Gus McNaughton as Otis Dove
- Iris Ashley as Singer
- Claude Hulbert as Reggie Fish Face Coke
- Emilio Colombo as Orchestra Leader
- Fred Duprez as George Anderson
- Toni Edgar-Bruce as Lady Abercrombie
- Dino Galvani
- Peter Godfrey as Fancourt
- Ellen Pollock as Madame
- Michael Anthony as Minor Role
- Monty Banks as Chauffeur
- Victor Rietti as Hotel Manager
- Robert Rietty as Fattorino the Page Boy
- Michael Wilding as Minor Role

== Reception ==
Allmovie dismissed the film as a "tired quota quickie" but British Pictures called the film a "brisk romantic comedy of misunderstandings. The supporting cast do well, but this is Constance Cummings' film all the way. She's effortlessly glamorous and watchable."

== Bibliography ==
- Low, Rachael. Filmmaking in 1930s Britain. George Allen & Unwin, 1985.
- Wood, Linda. British Films, 1927-1939. British Film Institute, 1986.
