= Trevor White =

Trevor White may refer to:

- Trevor White (actor) (born 1970), Canadian actor
- Trevor White (writer), Irish journalist
- Trevor White (musician) (born 1947), British born musician, part of Sounds Incorporated and solo artist
- Trevor White (skier) (born 1984), Canadian alpine skier
- Trevor White (producer) (born 1985), American film producer
