= You Made Me Love You =

You Made Me Love You may refer to:

- "You Made Me Love You (I Didn't Want to Do It)", a 1913 song, written by James V. Monaco, with lyrics by Joseph McCarthy
- You Made Me Love You (film), a 1933 musical film
- "You Made Me Love You", a song by R. Kelly from Chocolate Factory, 2003
