= Edward, My Son (play) =

1947 play written by Noel Langley and Robert Morley

Programme cover original production

Edward, My Son is a British play written by Noel Langley and Robert Morley. Its original West End run lasted for 782 performance between 30 May 1947 and 23 April 1949, initially at His Majesty's Theatre and then at the Lyric Theatre. The play portrays the moral decline of a business tycoon, Sir Arnold Holt, who has worked his way up from humble beginnings. Holt's efforts for social advancement are driven by his desire to provide the best for his only son, Edward of the title, who never actually appears.

The original cast included Morley himself as Arnold Holt alongside Peggy Ashcroft, Leueen MacGrath and Richard Caldicot. John Clements later took over the lead role from Morley. In 1948 it transferred to Broadway, lasting for 260 performances at the Martin Beck Theatre. The play was selected as one of the best plays of 1948-1949, with an excerpted version published in "The Burns Mantle Best Plays of 1948-1949."

== Original cast ==
- Arnold Holt - Robert Morley
- Evelyn Holt - Peggy Ashcroft
- Dr. "Larry" Parker - John Robinson
- Harry Soames - Richard Caldicot
- Dr. Waxman - James Cairncross
- Cunningham - Waldo Sturrey
- Ellerby - Norman Pitt
- Hanray - D.A. Clarke-Smith
- Eileen Perry - Leueen MacGrath
- Mr. Prothero - John Allen
- Montague Burton - James Cairncross
- Summers - Waldo Sturrey
- Phyllis Maxwell - Elspet Gray
- Betty Fowler - Patricia Hicks

== Film adaptation ==
In 1949 the play was adapted into a film Edward, My Son directed by George Cukor and starring Spencer Tracy as Holt and Deborah Kerr as his wife. The film was produced by Metro-Goldwyn-Mayer British Studios, and shot at Elstree Studios and on location in London.

== Bibliography ==
- Wearing, J.P. The London Stage 1940-1949: A Calendar of Productions, Performers, and Personnel. Rowman & Littlefield, 2014.
