= Confirm or Deny =

1941 film by Archie Mayo, Fritz Lang

- Theatrical poster
- Directed by: Archie Mayo; Fritz Lang (uncredited)
- Written by: Jo Swerling
- Story by: Samuel Fuller; Henry Wales
- Produced by: Len Hammond
- Starring: Don Ameche; Joan Bennett; Roddy McDowall; John Loder
- Cinematography: Leon Shamroy
- Edited by: Robert Bischoff
- Music by: David Buttolph
- Production company: 20th Century Fox
- Distributed by: 20th Century Fox
- Release date: December 12, 1941
- Running time: 74 minutes
- Country: United States
- Language: English

Confirm or Deny is a 1941 war drama film directed by Archie Mayo and starring Don Ameche, Joan Bennett and Roddy McDowall. It was produced and distributed by Hollywood studio 20th Century Fox. The screenplay was written by Jo Swerling, based on a story by Samuel Fuller and Henry Wales. An uncredited Fritz Lang worked on the film as director.

== Plot ==
In September 1940, American war correspondent "Mitch" Mitchell is stationed in London, working for Consolidated Press of America, which represents 1000 newspapers. Mitch is anxiously waiting for news of the expected German invasion of Britain from a reporter on the Continent (the United States being neutral at the time), determined to scoop his competition. He manages to rent Sir Titus Scott's wire from Penzance in Cornwall for a week to save forty minutes (for an exorbitant amount, much to the dismay of his boss, H. Cyrus Stuyvesant). The information is to come by coded radio and homing pigeon messages. Twelve-year-old Albert Perkins and the elderly Mr. Bindle watch for the pigeons.

During one of the many nighttime air raids against London, Mitch meets Jennifer Carson, a teletype operator at the Ministry of Information. They seek shelter in the Tube and become acquainted. The Consolidated offices (and all the teletype machines) are destroyed in the raid, but Mitch obtains the services of Jennifer and a teletype machine from Duffield, a Ministry of Information official. He then talks Mr Hobbs, the Regency Hotel's managing director, into letting Consolidated Press use the hotel's wine cellar for its new headquarters.

A bomb plunges into the cellar, but fails to explode, so everyone assumes it is a dud. Later, however, Jeff, a blind Consolidated employee, realizes it is live and notifies Mitch, just as Mitch finally receives the pigeon message he has been waiting for. Mitch evacuates the place, but Jennifer suspects he is merely trying to bypass the censor, Captain Lionel Channing, so she refuses to leave. Another bomb closes the entrance, trapping them in the cellar.

Mitch has Jennifer use the teletype to begin sending his big scoop: Hitler has gone to Calais, indicating the invasion is imminent. When Jennifer realizes he is sending uncensored information, she tries to persuade him to stop. They engage in a struggle before he locks her up. Then, Albert telephones with more pigeon-delivered vital information, but in the middle of the call, he is killed by the aerial attack. Mitch is devastated. Instead of transmitting his news, Mitch describes Albert's death. Jennifer is touched, and when the rescue team frees them, Mitch and Jennifer leave the wine cellar together.

== Cast ==
- Don Ameche as Mitch [Mitchell]
- Joan Bennett as Jennifer Carson
- Roddy McDowall as Albert Perkins
- John Loder as Captain [Lionel] Channing
- Raymond Walburn as H. Cyrus Stuyvesant
- Arthur Shields as Jeff
- Eric Blore as Mr. Hobbs
- Helene Whitney as Dorothy (as Helene Reynolds)
- Claud Allister as William (scenes deleted, according to IMDb, but in ending credits)
- Roseanne Murray as M.I. Girl
- Stuart Robertson as Johnny Dunne
- Queenie Leonard as Daisy
- Jean Prescott as Elizabeth Harding
- Billy Bevan as Mr. Bindle
- Lumsden Hare as Sir Titus Scott
- Dennis Hoey as Duffield
- Leonard Carey as Floorman

According to The New York Times, Alan Napier played Updyke, but he is not listed in the ending credits and IMDb reports his scenes were deleted.

== Reception ==
The New York Times review described the film as "another of those somewhat incredible yet moderately exciting melodramas which employs a strikingly realistic background of exploding bombs and crumbling buildings for no other purpose save to provide topical dressing for a routine romantic excursion." The reviewer did, however, like the work of Ameche ("breezy performance"), Bennett ("a splendid blackout find"), McDowell ("a sincere and touching portrait of youth in war") and Shields ("a telling characterization of a blind telegraph operator").

== Bibliography ==
- Kellow, Brian. The Bennetts: An Acting Family. University Press of Kentucky, 2004.
- McGilligan, Patrick. Fritz Lang: The Nature of the Beast. University of Minnesota Press, 2013.
