= Black Waters =

1929 film by Marshall Neilan

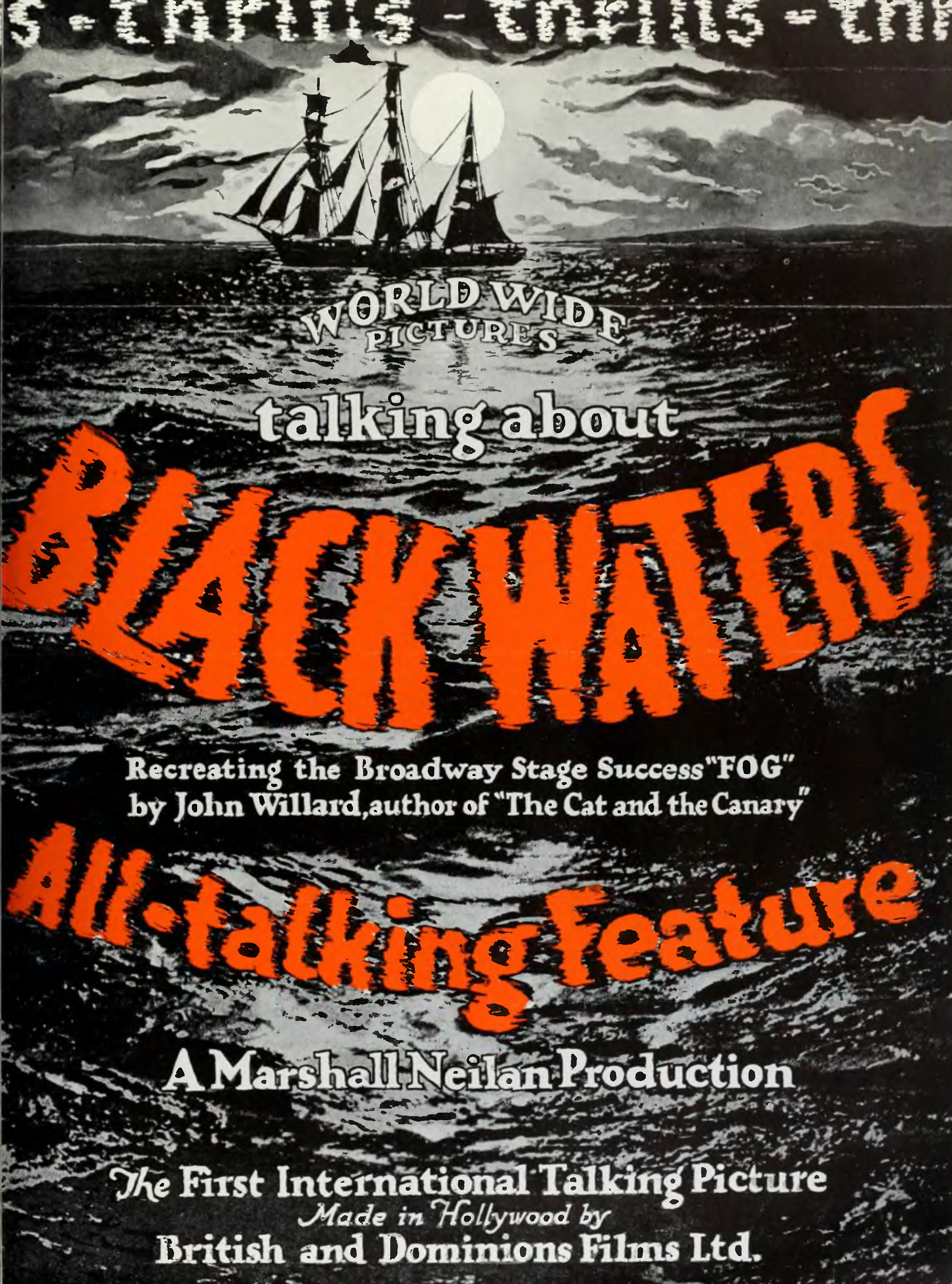
- Directed by: Marshall Neilan
- Written by: John Willard
- Based on: Fog (a play by John Willard)
- Produced by: Herbert Wilcox
- Starring: John Loder; James Kirkwood; Noble Johnson
- Cinematography: David Kesson
- Distributed by: British & Dominions Film Corporation; Sono Art-World Wide Pictures
- Release date: 1929
- Running time: 79 minutes
- Countries: United Kingdom; United States
- Languages: Sound (All-Talking); English
- Budget: £45,000

Black Waters is a 1929 British/American horror all-talking sound film produced by Herbert Wilcox and directed by Marshall Neilan. It was the first British-produced talking picture ever shown in England, but it was actually made in Hollywood since that is where the needed sound equipment was at that time. The American film company Sono Art-World Wide Pictures collaborated with British & Dominions Film Corporation to produce the sound film. They recorded the soundtrack using the RCA Photophone sound system. Wilcox sent Neilan to the U.S. to film the picture there, using a mostly American cast and crew. (Alfred Hitchcock's Blackmail (1929) is often said to be the first British talking picture, but it was actually released after Black Waters.)

Wilcox went on to star American actors in many of his later British films as well, to make them more appealing to British filmgoers, a practice that Hammer Films did away with after 1957.

Black Waters was written by American John Willard, based on his play Fog. Willard was the writer of the successful play The Cat and the Canary (1922), which was filmed several times and ripped off by a number of other filmmakers, and he was trying to repeat his success with this film, only replacing the "old dark house" setting with that of an "old dark houseboat". The cast featured Hollywood actor Noble Johnson (of King Kong fame).

Black Waters is today considered a lost film.

== Plot ==
A weird night watchman lures a group of people onto a rundown old yacht at a San Francisco pier at midnight. Once the boat sets sail, the passengers are murdered off one by one, until only two of them (Charles and Eunice) remain, along with a kindly old reverend who turns out to actually be the murderer, a crazy ship's captain named Tiger Larabee who disguises himself as a reverend to pull off a succession of murders.

== Cast ==
- John Loder as Charles, the hero
- Mary Brian as Eunice, the heroine
- James Kirkwood as the reverend Eph Kelly
- Frank Reicher as Randall
- Robert Ames as Darcy
- Noble Johnson as Jeelo
- Hallam Cooley as Chester
- Lloyd Hamilton as Temple
- Ben Hendricks Sr. as Olaf

== Production ==
Herbert Wilcox produced the film after visiting Hollywood to see the development of sound. He rented a soundproofed studio from Charles and Al Christie in Hollywood for five days at £1,000 a day. Wilcox claimed it was the fifth talking picture ever made. He later obtained a license from Western Electric to equip the first sound studio in Europe. Photoplay magazine noted that the film had a titular theme song, but it is not known to survive today.

== Reception ==
Wilcox struggled to get the film exhibited in England, as only a few British cinemas were equipped to handle sound pictures. Historian Chris Howarth stated "The film was long thought to have received scant attention upon its initial release, though some modern film critics who have studied the original reviews suggest that it might have been more inventive than originally assumed....".

== See also ==
- List of early sound feature films (1926–1929)

== Sources ==
- Wilcox, Herbert; "Twenty Five Thousand Sunsets" (1967)
