= Paris Plane =

- Directed by: John Paddy Carstairs
- Written by: Charles Bennett
- Produced by: Ivar Campbell
- Starring: John Loder; Molly Lamont; Allan Jeayes
- Production company: Sound City Films
- Distributed by: MGM
- Release date: September 1933
- Running time: 52 minutes
- Country: United Kingdom
- Language: English

Paris Plane is a 1933 British crime film directed by John Paddy Carstairs and starring John Loder, Molly Lamont and Allan Jeayes. It was made at Shepperton Studios as a quota quickie.

== Plot ==
A Scotland Yard detective pursues a murderer aboard a Paris bound Hercules plane. The murderer is disguised, making every passenger a suspect.

== Cast ==
- John Loder
- Molly Lamont
- Allan Jeayes
- Barry Livesey
- Julie Suedo
- Edwin Ellis
- James Harcourt
- Eileen Munro

== Critical reception ==
TV Guide gave the film two out of five stars, calling it "A claustrophobic thriller...A fairly interesting crime film that exploits its low budget successfully by containing the action in one enclosed area."

== Bibliography ==
- Low, Rachael. Filmmaking in 1930s Britain. George Allen & Unwin, 1985.
- Wood, Linda. British Films, 1927-1939. British Film Institute, 1986.
