= Syd Crossley =

English actor (1885–1960)

- Born: 18 November 1885; London, England, UK
- Died: 1 November 1960 (aged 74); Troon, Cornwall, England, UK
- Occupation: Actor
- Years active: 1925–1942

Syd Crossley (18 November 1885 – 1 November 1960) was an English stage and film actor. Born in London in 1885, Crossley began his career as a music hall comedian. He appeared in more than 110 films, often cast as a butler, between 1925 and 1942, with some of his most memorable early performances in Hal Roach shorts opposite Stan Laurel, Charley Chase, and Mabel Normand. He died in Troon, Cornwall.

== Partial filmography ==
- Dr. Pyckle and Mr. Pryde (1925)
- North Star (1925)
- The Unknown Soldier (1926)
- The Golden Web (1926)
- Jewels of Desire (1927)
- Romantic Rogue (1927)
- Play Safe (1927)
- One Hour Married (1927)
- The Blood Ship (1927)
- The Circus Kid (1928)
- Into No Man's Land (1928)
- Fangs of the Wild (1928)
- A Perfect Gentleman (1928)
- The Hate Ship (1929)
- Atlantic (1929)
- Atlantik (1929)
- The Younger Generation (1929)
- The Fatal Warning (1929)
- The Middle Watch (1930)
- Just for a Song (1930)
- Never Trouble Trouble (1931)
- The Professional Guest (1931)
- The Flying Fool (1931)
- For the Love of Mike (1932)
- Tonight's the Night (1932)
- The Mayor's Nest (1932)
- Here's George (1932)
- High Society (1932)
- The Umbrella (1933)
- The Bermondsey Kid (1933)
- You Made Me Love You (1933)
- The King's Cup (1933)
- Letting in the Sunshine (1933)
- Leave It to Me(1933)
- Over the Garden Wall (1934)
- Give Her a Ring (1934)
- The Night Club Queen (1934)
- Those Were the Days (1934)
- Dandy Dick (1935)
- Jimmy Boy (1935)
- The Deputy Drummer (1935)
- It's a Bet (1935)
- Honeymoon for Three (1935)
- The Man in the Mirror (1936)
- Public Nuisance No. 1 (1936)
- Two's Company (1936)
- Full Speed Ahead (1936)
- Cheer Up (1936)
- The Man Behind the Mask (1936)
- Pay Box Adventure (1936)
- Keep Your Seats, Please (1936)
- The Limping Man (1936)
- Queen of Hearts (1936)
- Old Mother Riley (1937)
- There Was a Young Man (1937)
- Rhythm Racketeer (1937)
- Young and Innocent (1937)
- Feather Your Nest (1937)
- Boys Will Be Girls (1937)
- Penny Paradise (1938)
- Sweet Devil (1938)
- We're Going to Be Rich (1938)
- Save a Little Sunshine (1938)
- Come On George! (1939)
- Meet Maxwell Archer (1940)
- Old Mother Riley's Circus (1941)
- Let the People Sing (1942)
