= Edward, My Son =

1949 film by George Cukor

- Original poster
- Directed by: George Cukor
- Screenplay by: Donald Ogden Stewart
- Based on: Edward, My Son; 1947 play by Noel Langley; Robert Morley
- Produced by: Edwin H. Knopf
- Starring: Spencer Tracy; Deborah Kerr; Ian Hunter
- Cinematography: Freddie Young
- Edited by: Raymond Poulton
- Music by: John Wooldridge
- Production company: MGM-British
- Distributed by: Metro-Goldwyn-Mayer
- Release dates: March 1, 1949 (UK); June 2, 1949 (US)
- Running time: 112 minutes
- Country: United Kingdom
- Language: English
- Budget: $2.4 million
- Box office: $2.1 million

Edward, My Son is a 1949 British drama film directed by George Cukor for MGM-British Studios that stars Spencer Tracy and Deborah Kerr. The screenplay by Donald Ogden Stewart is based on the 1947 play of the same title by Noel Langley and Robert Morley. The title character is never seen in the movie and montages of celebratory cakes show the passage of time.

== Plot ==
Canadian Arnold Boult and his wife Evelyn are celebrating the first birthday of their son Edward (who is never seen in the film) with their friend, physician Larry Woodhope, in their London home shortly after World War I. Arnold is about to embark upon a new career in finance with Harry Simpkin, who has been released from prison after serving time on fraud charges.

Five years later, Edward is diagnosed with a serious illness requiring a costly operation abroad. With his retail credit business doing poorly, Boult decides to burn down the building in order to finance the surgery with the insurance money. His partner, Simpkin, goes along with the plan despite reservations about the scheme.

As the years pass, Boult evolves into a wealthy, titled financier who will do anything to protect his son. When Edward is threatened with expulsion from his prep school, Lord Boult assumes its mortgage. Time passes, and Evelyn confides in Larry her concern that Edward drinks too much and appears to have no sense of morality. Larry strongly suggests that something be done to control Edward, but Lord Boult feels the young man can do no wrong.

Having served another sentence for fraud, Harry Simpkin comes to Boult and asks for a job. When Boult puts him off, he commits suicide by leaping from the roof of his former partner's office building. When the police investigate, Boult's secretary, Eileen Perrin, lies that Harry did not come to the office that day. She and Boult become lovers.

A year later, during a tryst in Eileen's apartment, the two discover they are being observed by a detective working for Evelyn's attorney. Anxious to avoid scandal, Boult breaks up with Eileen, who later dies from an overdose of pills. Boult departs for Switzerland to see his wife and Edward. Evelyn threatens to expose Boult to Edward so that their son will see his father's true nature. In return Boult promises he will destroy Doctor Woodhope, who loves her, unless she remains silent. Evelyn acquiesces.

As the years pass, she becomes increasingly unhappy and begins to drink heavily. Edward also has become an alcoholic and is engaged to socialite Phyllis Mayden, although young Betty Foxley, who is pregnant with Edward's child, believes he will marry her. Boult informs Betty of Edward's engagement and seems ready to pay her off or provide her with an abortion, but she rejects his overtures and proudly proclaims that she can take care of herself.

Edward, serving as a Royal Air Force pilot during World War II, crashes his plane while stunting and is killed along with his crew. Lord Boult, now a widower, has discovered that Larry delivered Betty's child. Boult beseeches Larry to tell him its whereabouts. Certain that Boult will have just as corrupting an influence upon the child's life as he'd had upon Edward's, Larry refuses, leaving his obsessed old friend determined to do whatever is necessary to find his grandchild. Boult's quest is temporarily interrupted when he is imprisoned for having burned down his business decades earlier, but after his release he declares his intent to resume the search.

== Cast ==
- Spencer Tracy as Arnold Boult
- Deborah Kerr as Evelyn Boult
- Ian Hunter as Larry Woodhope
- Mervyn Johns as Harry Sempkin
- Leueen MacGrath as Eileen Perrin
- Felix Aylmer as Mr. Hanray
- Walter Fitzgerald as Mr. Kedner
- Tilsa Page as Betty Foxley
- Ernest Jay as Walter Prothin
- Colin Gordon as Ellerby
- Harriette Johns as Phyllis Mayden

== Production ==
In the play, the title character is never seen, and director George Cukor opted to do the same in the film adaptation. The screenplay closely adhered to the original script, the only major change being Arnold Boult's conversion from British to Canadian so Spencer Tracy would not have to struggle with an accent. Tracy initially resisted playing such an unsympathetic character but later told Cukor: "It's rather disconcerting to me to find out how easily I play a heel."

Cukor originally wanted his close friend and Tracy's lover Katharine Hepburn for the role of Eileen, but the couple were sensitive about working together too frequently. Cukor also feared casting a major star in the relatively small role would throw the picture off balance and draw attention away from leading lady Deborah Kerr.

Leueen MacGrath ended up as Eileen, reprising a role she had played on stage.

== Reception ==
=== Box-office ===
According to MGM records, the film earned $1,267,000 in the US and Canada and $875,000 overseas resulting in a loss to the studio of $1,159,000. Variety listed the film as a box office disappointment.

=== Critical reception ===
Bosley Crowther of The New York Times observed: "Shallow, perhaps, as a study of the accumulation of power, this drama is nonetheless gripping in its expose of the intimate life of a man in his ruthless rise from poverty to fabulous position and wealth . . . And not only is the story intriguing in its details, but some of the people in it are consistently interesting . . . However, it must be acknowledged that Mr. Tracy . . . fails to give clear definition or consistency to this ruthless man . . . as Mr. Tracy plays him, he is a really decent sort who sells his soul for the sake of his beloved son and whose defection seems to haunt him for the rest of his life. His moments of hard and ruthless dealing, in which his eyes narrow coldly and his jaw sets, are heavily interlarded with gay and smiling gobs of Tracy charm. There is nothing sardonic about him. He is even dull as a personality . . . Say this, however, for the film folks: they haven't put Edward on the screen. That major restraint is most welcome."

=== Awards and nominations ===
Deborah Kerr was nominated for the Academy Award for Best Actress and the Golden Globe Award for Best Actress – Motion Picture Drama but lost both to Olivia de Havilland in The Heiress.

== See also ==
- List of British films of 1949
