= William Lowe (British Army officer) =

British Army general (1861–1944)

Major-General William Lowe CB
- Born: William Henry Muir Lowe; 20 October 1861; North-Western Provinces, British India
- Died: 7 February 1944 (aged 82); London, England
- Spouse: Frances Broster de Salvo (m. 1895; died 1942)
- Children: 2, including John Loder
- Military career
- Allegiance: United Kingdom
- Branch: British Army
- Service years: 1881–1907; 1914–1919
- Rank: Major-General
- Unit: 7th Dragoon Guards
- Commands: 3rd Reserve Cavalry Brigade
- Conflicts: 1882 Anglo-Egyptian War; Third Anglo-Burmese War; Second Boer War; First World War; Easter Rising
- Awards: Companion of the Order of the Bath; Mentioned in Despatches

Major-General William Henry Muir Lowe CB (20 October 1861 – 7 February 1944) was a British Army officer who commanded the British forces in Dublin during the Easter Rising of 1916 and received the surrender of the Irish republican forces.

== Early life and career ==
Lowe was born in North-Western Provinces, India, to William Henry Lowe of the Indian Civil Service, and Caroline Charlotte Muir. He was educated at the Royal Military College, Sandhurst, and commissioned in the 7th Dragoon Guards as a lieutenant on 22 October 1881. The following year he saw action in the Egyptian Campaign, where the 7th Dragoon Guards were part of the 1st Cavalry Brigade led by General Sir Baker Russell. Lowe was involved in the fighting at Kassassin, the Battle of Tel el-Kebir and the march on Cairo. He received the Egypt Medal and the Khedive's Star, a medal presented by Khedive Tawfiq to all officers and men engaged in the campaign.

In 1886, Lowe went to Burma from India, where the 7th Dragoon Guards were stationed, as a special service officer to the Upper Burma Task Force during the guerrilla phase of the Third Anglo-Burmese War. Remaining in Burma until 1887, he received the India General Service Medal with two clasps. He was promoted to the rank of captain on 9 March 1887 and major on 2 March 1892.

== Second Boer War ==
On 19 September 1899, he was promoted to lieutenant-colonel and assumed command of the 7th Dragoon Guards. The regiment embarked the SS Armenian in Southampton on 8 February 1900, and departed for service in South Africa, with Lowe in command of the men on the ship. From 1900 to 1902, he led the regiment in the Second Boer War, being present at the capture of Pretoria and the Battle of Diamond Hill, and was promoted brevet colonel in November 1900. Lord Kitchener's despatch of 8 August 1901 related how "at midnight on the 30th July Colonel Lowe, 7th Dragoon Guards, successfully surprised a farmhouse, from which he took 11 armed prisoners with rifles, bandoliers and horses." Lowe was twice more Mentioned in Despatches: in Lord Roberts' Recommendations, 2 April 1901 and in Lord Kitchener's Final Despatch, 23 June 1902. He received both the Queen's and King's South Africa Medal.

Following the end of the war in June 1902 he returned home on the SS Galeka which arrived in Southampton in October 1902. He left the 7th Dragoon Guards in March 1903 to become assistant quartermaster general of the II Corps (Southern Command), being promoted to full colonel. In May 1905, he went to the Northern Command as colonel in charge of cavalry records and staff officer for the Imperial Yeomanry. He was made a Companion of the Order of the Bath in 1906. He went on half-pay in March 1907 and retired a year later.

== Easter Rising ==
On the outbreak of the First World War in 1914, Lowe rejoined the army as inspector of cavalry, and was appointed as a brigade commander with the temporary rank of brigadier general in April 1915. He was commander of the 3rd Reserve Cavalry Brigade, stationed at the Curragh Camp in Ireland, at the outbreak of the Easter Rising on Monday, 24 April 1916. On being informed of the Rising by phone, he ordered the brigade to Dublin by train. Arriving himself at Kingsbridge railway station in the early hours of Tuesday morning, Lowe assumed command of British forces in Dublin and set about securing the line between the station, Dublin Castle and Trinity College, thus dividing the rebel positions north and south of the river. It was Lowe who ordered the shelling of the unoccupied Liberty Hall with Royal Artillery field guns in Trinity College, and who ordered the Sherwood Foresters to continue advancing on Mount Street Bridge with a high cost in casualties. On Saturday, 29 April, after being approached by Nurse Elizabeth O'Farrell, he agreed to negotiate with the leaders only if they would surrender unconditionally, and at 2.30 pm that day, accompanied by Nurse O'Farrell, Patrick Pearse surrendered to Lowe. He was awarded the honorary rank of major general in January 1917.

== Personal life ==
Lowe married, in 1895, Frances Broster Johnson (née de Salvo; 1857–1942), the widow of Captain Robert Harry Johnson of the 64th Foot Regiment and daughter of Emma Broster, an Englishwoman and Francesco de Salvo, of Palermo, Sicily. Together they had a son and a daughter. Their son, John, was a British Army officer who, with his father, took part in suppressing the Rising and accepting the surrender of Pearse. John Lowe fought at Gallipoli and the Somme. He later became a Hollywood actor under the screen name John Loder. General Lowe died in London on 7 February 1944, aged 82. Neither an otherwise comprehensive obituary in The Times nor an entry in Who Was Who 1941–1950 made reference to his role in the Easter Rising.
