= Sunset Pass (1929 film) =

1929 film

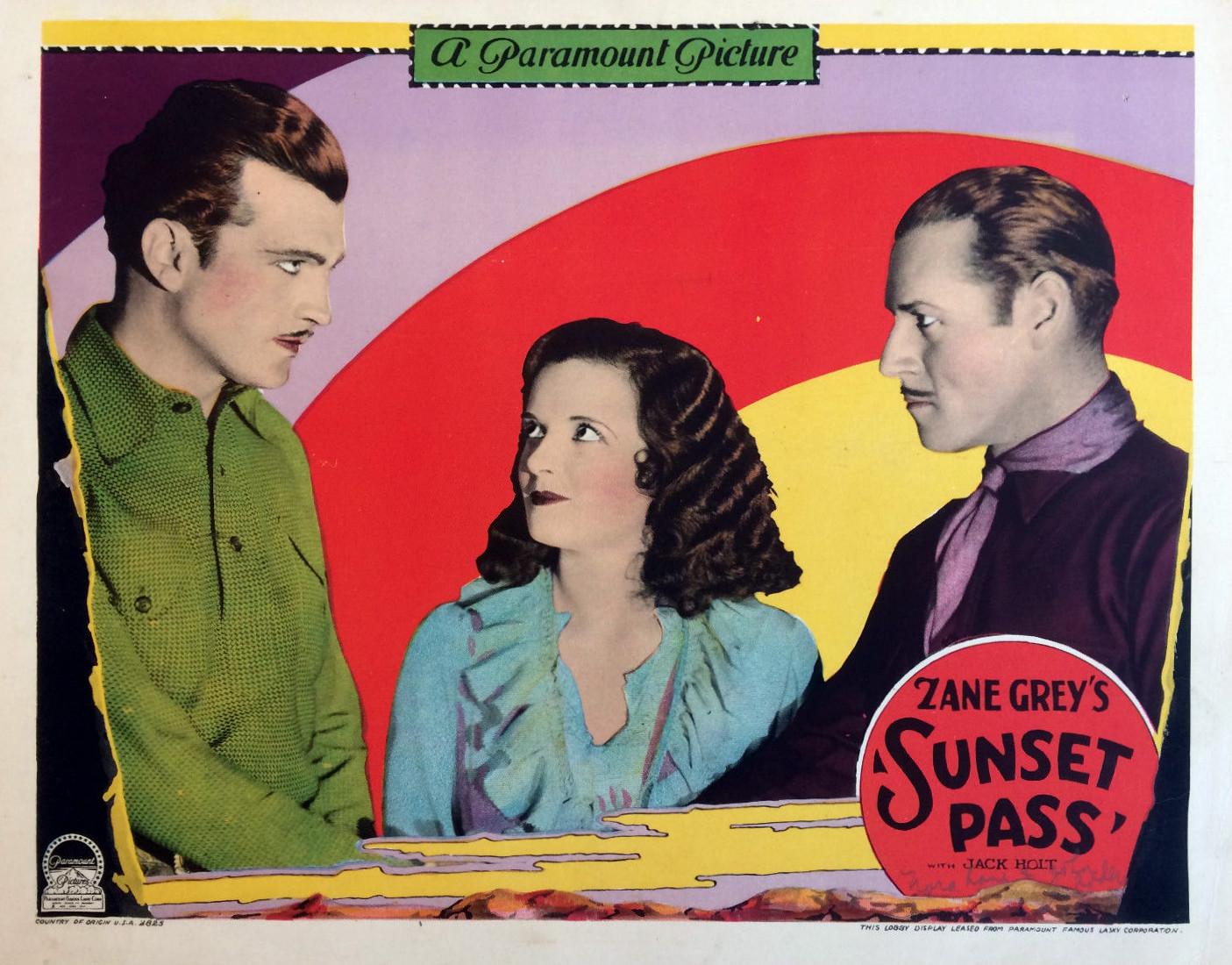
- Lobby card
- Directed by: Otto Brower
- Screenplay by: Ray Harris; J. Walter Ruben
- Based on: Sunset Pass by Zane Grey
- Produced by: Paramount Famous Lasky Corp.
- Starring: Jack Holt, Nora Lane and John Loder
- Cinematography: Roy Clark
- Edited by: Jane Loring
- Distributed by: Paramount Pictures
- Release date: 1929
- Running time: 6 reels
- Country: United States
- Languages: Silent; English intertitles

Sunset Pass is a lost 1929 American silent Western film directed by Otto Brower. It stars Jack Holt, Nora Lane, and John Loder.

== Cast ==
- Jack Holt as Jack Rock
- Nora Lane sa Leatrice Preston
- John Loder as Ashleigh Preston
- Christian J. Frank as Chuck
- Gilbert Holmes as Shorty (credited as Pee Wee Holmes)
- Chester Conklin as Windy
- Pat Harmon as Clink Peeples
- Alfred Allen as Amos Dabb
- Guy Oliver as Clark
- Dannie Mac Grant (uncredited)
- James Pier Mason (uncredited)
