= Diamond Frontier =

1940 film by Harold D. Schuster

- Directed by: Harold D. Schuster
- Written by: Edmund L. Hartmann; Stanley Rubin
- Produced by: Marshall Grant
- Starring: Victor McLaglen; John Loder; Anne Nagel
- Cinematography: Milton R. Krasner
- Edited by: W. Donn Hayes
- Music by: Hans J. Salter
- Production company: Universal Pictures
- Distributed by: Universal Pictures
- Release date: October 1, 1940
- Running time: 73 minutes
- Country: United States
- Language: English

Diamond Frontier is a 1940 American adventure film directed by Harold D. Schuster and starring Victor McLaglen, John Loder and Anne Nagel. It was based on the story A Modern Monte Cristo by Stanley Rubin and Edmund L. Hartmann. The film's sets were designed by the art director Jack Otterson.

== Plot ==
A man tries to enforce the law in a rowdy South African diamond-mining town.

== Principal cast ==
- Victor McLaglen as Terrence Regan
- John Loder as Doctor Charles Clayton
- Anne Nagel as Jeanne Krueger
- Cecil Kellaway as Noah
- Philip Dorn as Jan Stafford De Winter
- Francis Ford as Derek Bluje
- Lionel Belmore as Piet Bloem
- Evelyn Selbie as Julia Bloem
- Hugh Sothern as Travers
- Ferris Taylor as Paul Willem
- J. Anthony Hughes as Matt Campbell
