= We're Going to Be Rich =

- Publicity brochure
- Directed by: Monty Banks
- Written by: Sam Hellman; Rohama Siegel; James Edward Grant
- Produced by: Samuel G. Engel
- Starring: Gracie Fields; Victor McLaglen; Brian Donlevy
- Cinematography: Mutz Greenbaum
- Music by: Bretton Byrd
- Production company: Twentieth Century Fox
- Distributed by: Twentieth Century Fox
- Release date: 3 July 1938
- Running time: 78 minutes
- Country: United Kingdom
- Language: English
- Budget: £307,441

We're Going to Be Rich is a 1938 British historical musical comedy film directed by Monty Banks and starring Gracie Fields, Victor McLaglen and Brian Donlevy.

== Plot ==
During the 1880s Kit Dobson, an English music hall singer performing in Australia, has scraped together enough money to buy a passage home to Britain with plans to settle down. However, unknown to her, her unreliable boyfriend has used most of the money to buy a gold mine in South Africa. They arrive in Gold Rush Johannesburg only to find that they have been swindled. The only option left for them is for Kit to seek a job singing in a saloon run by an American known as Yankee Gordon.

== Cast ==
- Gracie Fields as Kit Dobson
- Victor McLaglen as Dobbie
- Brian Donlevy as Yankee Gordon
- Coral Browne as Pearl
- Ted Smith as Tim
- Gus McNaughton as Broderick
- Charles Carson as Keeler
- Syd Crossley as Jake
- Hal Gordon as Charlie
- Robert Nainby as Judge
- Charles Harrison as Rat Face
- Tom Payne as Kinch
- Don McCorkindale as Killer
- Joe Mott as Manager
- Alex Davies as Kimberley Kid

== Production ==
The film was the first made following Fields switch from Ealing Studios to 20th Century Fox. It was shot at Denham Studios. It was made with a budget of $500,000.

== Bibliography ==
- Low, Rachael. Filmmaking in 1930s Britain. George Allen & Unwin, 1985.
- Wood, Linda. British Films, 1927-1939. British Film Institute, 1986.
