= Jane Loring =

American film editor and producer

- Born: June 6, 1890; Denver, Colorado, USA
- Died: March 15, 1983 (aged 92); Los Angeles, California, USA
- Occupation(s): Film editor, producer, actress, assistant director
- Relatives: Hope Loring

Jane Loring (1890–1983) was an American film editor and producer active during the 1920s through the 1940s. She was related to screenwriter Hope Loring.

== Biography ==
Little is known about Loring's early life, although she later told journalists she broke away from her parents when she was just 13. Born in Denver, Loring decided when she was 16 that she wanted to become a director.

She was also an accomplished violinist, and it was this talent that took her to New York City. While in NYC, she performed in an orchestra and also took on stage roles. She'd later appear as an actress in a number of silent films. After that, she secured a position as a stenographer for Al Kaufman; she then moved onto a script-girl position.

Before joining Famous Players–Lasky's editing staff in 1926, she edited movie trailers. In the early 1930s, she moved to RKO, where she edited films and worked as Pandro S. Berman's right-hand woman, sometimes working as an assistant director. She was good friends with Katharine Hepburn and edited many of Hepburn's films.

== Selected filmography ==
- A Woman Rebels (1936)
- Mary of Scotland (1936)
- Sylvia Scarlett (1935)
- Alice Adams (1935)
- Thirty Day Princess (1934)
- Good Dame (1934)
- White Woman (1933)
- Three Cornered Moon (1933)
- Her Bodyguard (1933)
- The Crime of the Century (1933)
- Madame Butterfly (1932)
- Merrily We Go to Hell (1932)
- Working Girls (1931)
- The Gang Buster (1931)
- Along Came Youth (1930)
- Anybody's Woman (1930)
- The Light of Western Stars (1930)
- Pointed Heels (1929)
- The Saturday Night Kid (1929)
- Fast Company (1929)
- Sunset Pass (1929)
- Avalanche (1929)
- The Water Hole (1928)
- Gentlemen Prefer Blondes (1928)
