= Play Safe (1927 film) =

1927 film by Joseph Henabery

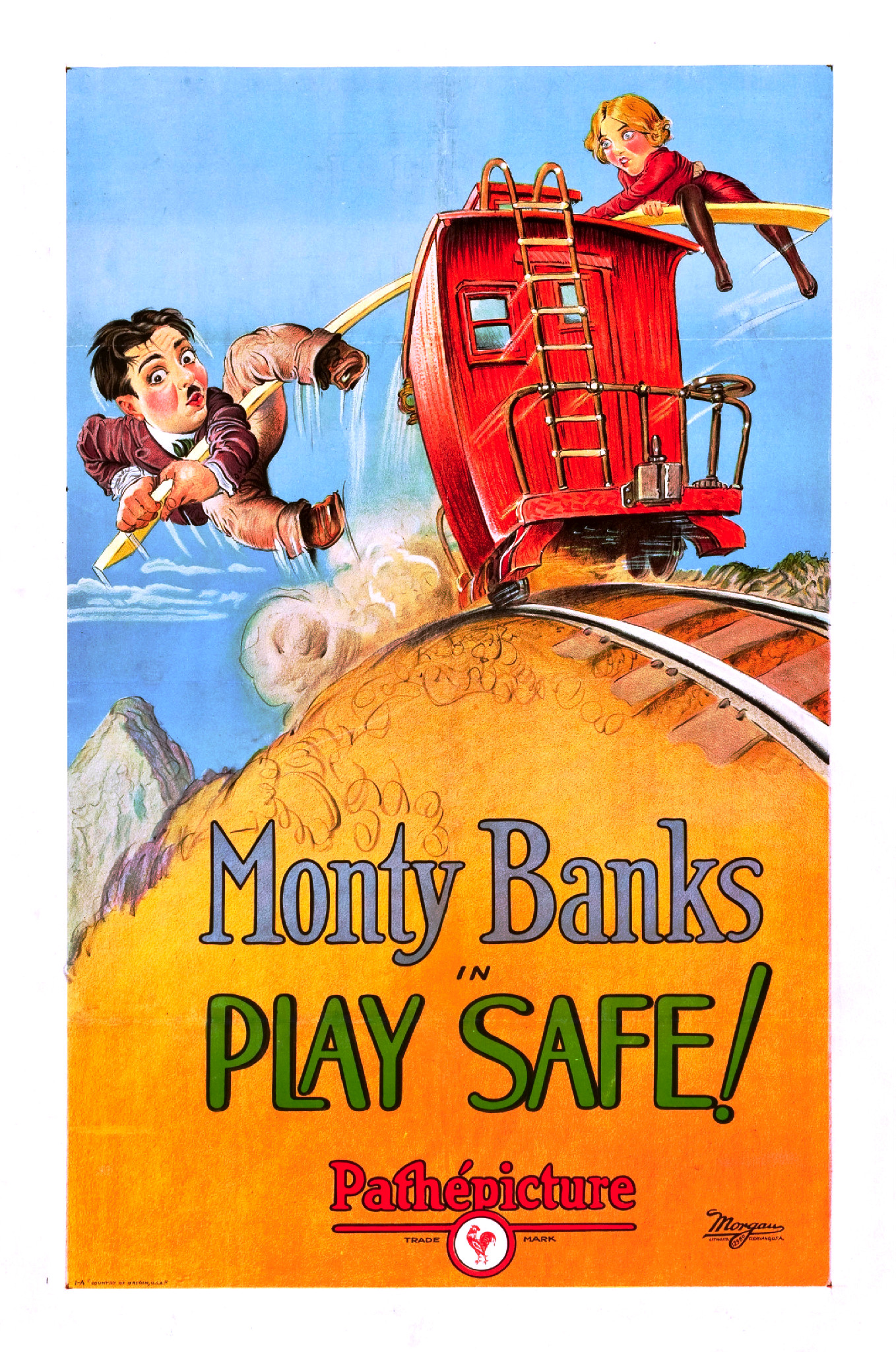
- Film poster
- Directed by: Joseph Henabery
- Written by: Charles Horan; Henry Sweet
- Produced by: Monty Banks; Howard Estabrook
- Starring: Monty Banks; Virginia Lee Corbin
- Cinematography: Blake Wagner
- Production company: Monty Banks Productions
- Distributed by: Pathé Exchange
- Release date: January 10, 1927
- Running time: 50 minutes (5 reels)
- Country: United States
- Language: Silent (English intertitles)

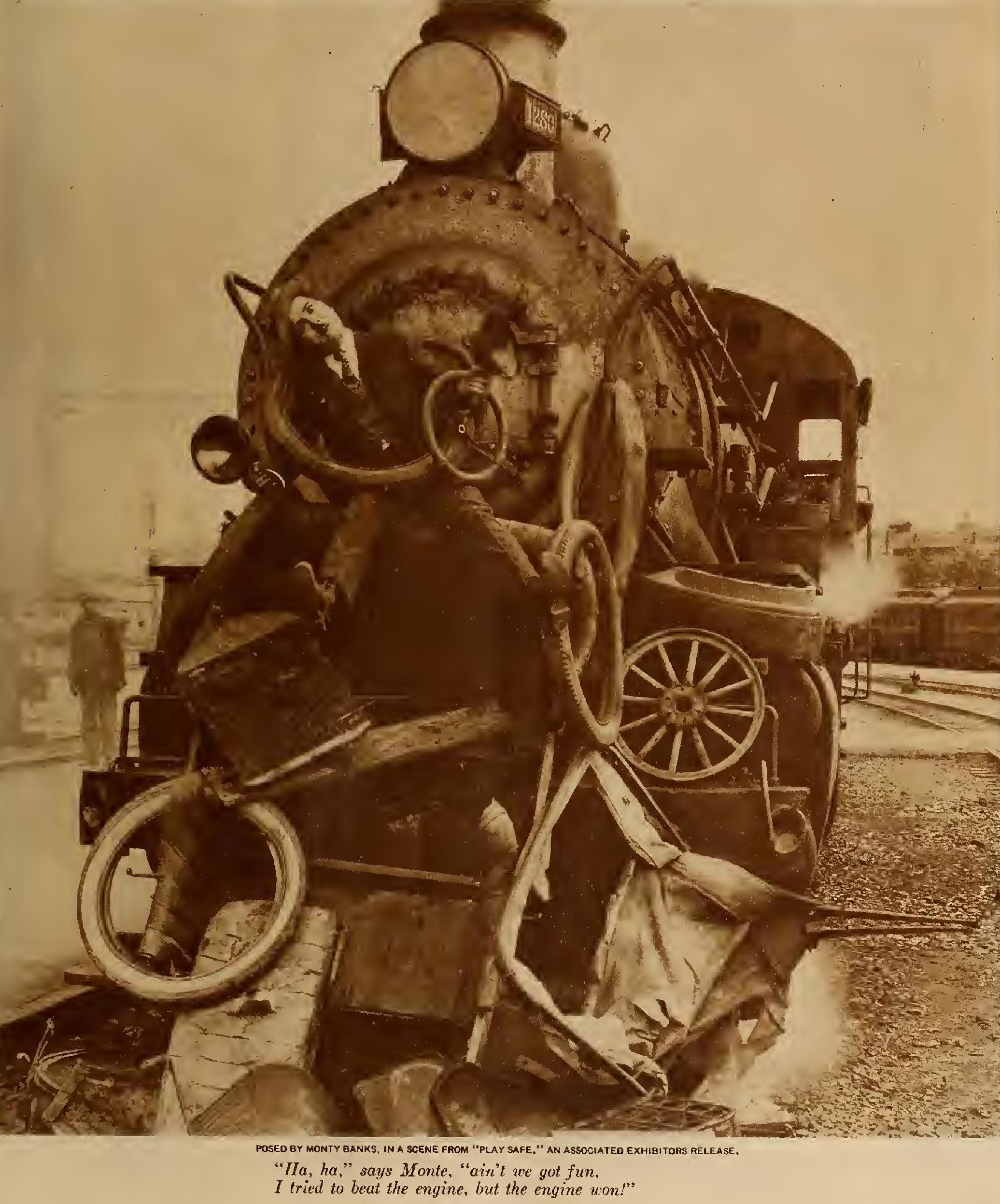
Monty Banks poses in a scene for a Play Safe ad in Film Fun, 1926

Play Safe is a 1927 American silent comedy film directed by Joseph Henabery and starring Monty Banks. An abridged two-reel version was shown in the United States as Chasing Choo Choos.

== Plot ==
A gang of bad guys menace a man's girlfriend. She hides in a freight car and a misstep sends the otherwise-empty train out of the station with the lever pushed to full speed. As the train gains speed, the captive's boyfriend must transfer to the runaway train from a car racing alongside, repel the pursuing gang, get his girl out of the boxcar, and somehow get the two of them to safety. An oncoming locomotive, a water tower, a steep grade, a frayed rope and a broken plank between cars complicate the hero's task.

== Cast ==
- Monty Banks as Monty
- Virginia Lee Corbin as Virginia Craig
- Charles Hill Mailes as Silas Scott
- Charles K. Gerrard as Scott's son
- Bud Jamison as Big Bill
- Max Asher
- Fatty Alexander
- Rosa Gore
- Syd Crossley

== Preservation status ==
Prints in 35mm and 16mm exist.
