= Victor Rietti =

Italian actor and director (1888–1963)

- Born: Vittorio Rietti; 29 February 1888; Ferrara, Italy
- Died: 3 December 1963 (aged 75); London, England, U.K.
- Education: Royal Conservatory of Brussels
- Occupations: Actor, director, playwright
- Years active: 1933–1963
- Spouse: Rachel Rosenay (1920–1963) (his death) (2 children)
- Children: Ronald Rietti; Robert Rietti

Victor Rietti (29 February 1888 – 3 December 1963) was an Italian-born actor and director who emigrated to the United Kingdom.

He became known through his work in television, especially through the many live television productions of the Italian play To Live in Peace during the 1950s. He was knighted by the Italian government.

== Biography ==
Born in Ferrara, Italy, in 1888 to a wealthy family, Vittorio Rietti was the eleventh of the twelve children of Samuele and Lucia Rietti. At the age of 13, he was discovered by the tragedian actor Tommaso Salvini while partaking in a charity performance. Salvini encouraged the boy to make the stage his career and it was under Salvini that he studied acting.

Rietti made his stage debut playing in Shakespeare at Bologna. At age 19, he had the distinction of being juvenile lead to Eleonora Duse in her company.

However, his parents, who wanted him to develop his musical talents, had him resume his studies and Vittorio studied violin at the Royal Conservatory of Brussels. Studying together with him in Brussels was his cousin, Vittorio Rieti (later a Broadway composer).

He formed his own band, the Rietti String Players, with considerable success.

He served in the Italian Army during the First World War. After World War I, Rietti resumed his stage career.

In 1921, he founded Drama Players Theater (later called Teatro Italiano and still later, International Theater) which he ran for forty years, producing popular Italian plays of the time. He would personally translate and adapt these plays into English and play the lead. He often cast his young son, Bobby Rietti (known as Robert Rietti as an adult), in these plays.

As a sideline, he taught acting; among his pupils were Ida Lupino, June Duprez and his son, Bobby. His other son, Ronald Rietti, later became a film director and producer.

Rietti's first motion picture was released in 1933, for which he was credited as Victor Rietti. He would appear in around thirty-six motion pictures, including a role as Beppo in Sinfonia Fatale (1946), the first American motion picture to be shot entirely in Italy. He made a cameo appearance in Come Fly with Me (1963) which would be his last film. He also broadcast in some forty-three radio plays.

=== Stardom ===
Rietti had a major success in the live-television production of To Live in Peace (1951), playing the lead role, the lovable priest Don Geronimo Bonaparte, uncle of Napoleon – a part he previously played on the stage in one of his own productions. He had personally translated the Italian play by Giovacchino Forzano and adapted it for television. The television play won critical acclaim being voted best play of 1951. Rietti himself was given the critics' Oscar for best television actor of 1951 for his performance.

Due to popular demand, To Live in Peace was re-staged for television in early 1952 by the BBC, in 1956 by RAI, and again in 1957 by the BBC. In addition, it was broadcast for radio in 1953 and 1956, with Rietti repeating his performance in all six productions, and his son, Robert, playing the part of Maso.

In addition, NBC's Kraft Television Theatre anthology series televised a special color broadcast of To Live in Peace in 1953 – the first of only two color broadcasts Kraft Television Theatre did in its eleven-year run. CBC Television televised it in 1957.

Rietti's television success with To Live in Peace led to his touring internationally with the play for Ralph Reader.

Samuel French bought the book rights to the play, and published it in 1952. Producer Sydney Box planned a motion picture of the play starring Rietti which never evolved.

Eleven additional radio productions of the play were broadcast around the world. Rietti's overnight success led to his surprise appearance on the televised gala special Life Begins at Sixty and established him as a lead actor in television.

He had the title role in The Wanderer (1952) and as Professor Toti in Against the Stream (1959), both lead roles of Italian plays he had translated and adapted for television.

For American television, he guest starred with his son, Robert Rietty, in The Jack Benny Program (1957) – in which he played two roles – and Harry's Girls (1963), both directed by his friend Ralph Levy. He guest starred on The Bob Hope Show in 1954.

=== Later life ===
On 23 July 1959, Rietti and his son, Robert, were knighted with the title of cavaliere by the Italian government for their contribution to Italian culture, in particular, for translating and adapting a great many Italian plays into English.

=== Death and legacy ===
When Rietti was thirty-five years old, he was given six months to live by his doctors due to a heart condition. On 3 December 1963, some forty years later, he suffered a fatal heart attack.

His life story was dramatized in the BBC radio play Papa Rietti.

== Partial filmography ==
- Bitter Sweet (1933)
- Heads We Go (1933) as Hotel Manager (uncredited)
- The Song You Gave Me (1933) as Nightclub Manager (uncredited)
- Jew Süss (1934) as Rabbi (uncredited)
- Oh, Daddy! (1935) as Hotel Manager
- Escape Me Never (1935) as Italian Grocer (uncredited)
- Jimmy Boy (1935)
- Man of the Moment (1935) as Hotel Manager (uncredited)
- The Ghost Goes West (1935) as Scientist (uncredited)
- Two Hearts in Harmony (1935) as Calvazzi
- Jack of All Trades (1936) as Head Waiter (uncredited)
- Where There's a Will (1936) as Maitre D (uncredited)
- Juggernaut (1936) as Doctor Bousquet
- Dusty Ermine (1936) as Luggage Snatcher (uncredited)
- Show Flat (1936)
- Shipmates o' Mine (1936) as Photographer (uncredited)
- London Melody (1937) as Joseph Domingo (uncredited)
- Who's Your Lady Friend? (1937)
- Take It from Me (1937) as Sailor (uncredited)
- The Divorce of Lady X (1938) as Monsieur Bianco - Hotel Manager (uncredited)
- The Viper (1938)
- 21 Days (1940) as Antonio (uncredited)
- Room for Two (1940) as Gaston
- Thunder Rock (1942) as Doctor (uncredited)
- The Peterville Diamond (1943) as Board Member (uncredited)
- Yellow Canary (1943) as Georgem, Night Club Manager (uncredited)
- Hotel Reserve (1944) as Restaurant Owner (uncredited)
- Give Us the Moon (1944) as Maître d (uncredited)
- Fatal Symphony (1947) as Beppo
- A Man About the House (1947) as Porter at train station (uncredited)
- The Glass Mountain (1949) (uncredited)
- Mr. H.C. Andersen (1950) as King Frederick
- Little World of Don Camillo (1952) as Bishop (voice)
- The Story of Esther Costello (1957) as Signor Gatti
- The Naked Truth (1957) as Doctor
- The Story of Joseph and His Brethren (1960) as Baker
- Village of Daughters (1962) as Luigi
- Come Fly with Me (1963) as Old Passenger (uncredited)

== Sources ==
- To Live in Peace – A Play in Three Acts by Victor Rietti (London: Samuel French Limited, 1952)
- A Forehead Pressed against a Window by Robert Rietti (New York, 2009)
