= Man of the Moment (1935 film) =

- Directed by: Monty Banks
- Written by: Guy Bolton; Roland Pertwee; A. R. Rawlinson
- Based on: "Water Nymph" by Yves Mirande
- Produced by: Irving Asher
- Starring: Douglas Fairbanks Jr.; Laura La Plante; Margaret Lockwood; Claude Hulbert
- Cinematography: Basil Emmott; Leslie Rowson
- Edited by: Bert Bates
- Production company: First National Pictures
- Distributed by: Warner Bros. Pictures
- Release date: September 1935
- Running time: 82 minutes
- Country: United Kingdom
- Language: English

Man of the Moment (also known as Water Nymph) is a 1935 British comedy film directed by Monty Banks and starring Douglas Fairbanks Jr., Laura La Plante and Margaret Lockwood. It was written by Guy Bolton, Roland Pertwee and A. R. Rawlinson, and was made at Teddington Studios by the British subsidiary of Warner Brothers. The film's art direction was by Peter Proud.

It was the first film to be shown on BBC Television, on 12 September 1938.

== Plot ==
Office worker Mary Briany finds out she is being demoted by the boss she secretly loves in order to make room for his girlfriend. She tries to commit suicide by jumping into the river. Tony Woodward is driving by and rescues her, much to her annoyance.

He takes her back to his mansion, but he and his butler Godfrey have great difficulty getting her to behave. Meanwhile, Tony is to be married the next day to childish heiress Vera Barton. She reveals to Tony's friend Lord Rufus Paul that she plans to change Tony's lifestyle completely - no more smoking or drinking. Her millionaire father promises his nearly penniless future son-in-law 5000 pounds to pay for a partnership in a company.

Later, Mary crashes Tony's bachelor party, dressed as a man in his younger brother's clothes. The next day, Vera and her father find Tony, Mary, and his friends passed out on the floor. As a result, Vera breaks off the wedding.

With only £300 and deeply in debt, Tony proposes a suicide pact to Mary. They will fly to Monte Carlo to try to win a fortune at the casino. If they lose, they will kill themselves. The first day does not go well. They are ready to jump off a cliff when a gentleman finds them and gives them £20 they did not know they had won. On their second chance, they split up to gamble. Tony loses, but Mary has an incredible lucky streak and wins a large amount of money.

Meanwhile, Vera decides she wants to marry Tony after all. Rufus brings news about Tony's whereabouts, and they go to Monte Carlo. Vera embraces Tony before Mary can tell him the good news. Heartbroken, Mary climbs out on the hotel ledge, but Tony finds her and tells her he loves her. (Annoyed at being jilted, Vera decides that she wants to marry a man that no other woman would desire; she picks Rufus.)

== Cast ==
- Douglas Fairbanks Jr. as Tony Woodward
- Laura La Plante as Mary Briany
- Claude Hulbert as Lord Rufus Paul
- Margaret Lockwood as Vera Barton
- Peter Gawthorne as Mr. Barton
- Donald Calthrop as Godfrey
- Morland Graham as Mr. Rumcorn
- Eve Gray as Miss Madden
- Margaret Yarde as landlady
- Wyndham Goldie as Jason Randall
- Patrick Ludlow as roulette player
- Martita Hunt as roulette player
- Tony Hankey as party guest
- Monty Banks as doctor
- Hal Gordon as Police Sergeant
- Charles Hawtrey as Tom
- Victor Rietti as hotel manager
- John Singer as small boy

== Production ==
The film was one of a number that Douglas Fairbanks Jr. made in England. It was produced by Irving Asher of Warner Brothers, who had a brief to make 20 films year under the British quota system. Asher had helped finance some films Fairbanks Jr. produced in England for his own company; in return for the loan, Fairbanks Jr. agreed to appear in the next film Asher produced, which turned out to be Man of the Moment. His co-star, Laura La Plante, was married to Asher. The films failed and Fairbanks was broke. Fairbanks later wrote:

Professionally, Man of the Moment was not at all what I should have done in that period. But Irving hoped that with my name and Laura's, a good supporting cast and direction by an ex-Hollywood comedian whimsically named Monty Banks, Warners would overlook the picture's quota category and release it in the States and Canada. Although they never did, I had the best time imaginable making the movie.

== Release ==
The film was released in the UK on 24 February 1936. It was not released in the United States.

== Reception ==
The Daily Film Renter wrote: "In the main role Laura La Plante thoroughly lets herself go, indulging to excellent effect her quaint aptitude for making herself look ridiculous without sacrificing her charm; her bubbling performance is a firm axis on which the gay story revolves. Fairbanks, Junior, plays up to her with verve and enthusiasm, the latter quality marking the portrayals of an effective all-round supporting cast, which includes Claude Hulbert at his idiotic best, Margaret Lockwood, Peter Gawthorne and Donald Calthrop, with Moreland Graham making a big impression as a screen recruit in the early sequences. In a momentary appearance, Monty Banks – whose direction renders cach piquant situation in italics as it were – shamelessly acts the stars right out of the picture."

Picturegoer wrote: "The light treatment of the plot does much to conceal its basic novelettish character, and there are some clever twists and natural dialogue. Claude Hulbert is quite amusing in one of his usual asinine roles, but Margaret Lockwood is weak as Vera. The support generally is sound and the technical qualities of the production are exceedingly good."

Picture Show wrote: "Douglas Fairbanks, Jun as the much-worried Tony, plays the part cleverly, and is strongly supported by Laura La Plante as Mary. Claude Hulbert as Rufus proves most amusing. Margaret Lockwood, as the tearful Vera, appears to have been miscast, but does quite well in a role which does not suit her. Settings and photography are most effective. Excellent light entertainment."
