= Anything to Declare? =

1938 British film by Redd Davis

- Directed by: Redd Davis
- Written by: Hayter Preston
- Starring: John Loder; Noel Madison; Belle Chrystall
- Production company: Rembrandt Film Productions
- Distributed by: Butcher's Film Service (UK)
- Release date: December 1938
- Running time: 76 minutes
- Country: United Kingdom
- Language: English
- Budget: £18,428

Anything to Declare? is a 1938 British crime thriller film directed by Redd Davis and starring John Loder, Noel Madison and Belle Chrystall. It was written by Hayter Preston and shot at Nettlefold Studios in Walton-on-Thames.

== Plot ==
A new gas formula that can be used as a deadly weapon invented by a pioneering British scientist draws the interest of a shadowy peace movement, which masks a more sinister intent.

== Cast ==
- John Loder as Captain Rufus Grant
- Noel Madison as Doctor Heinz Klee
- Belle Chrystall as Nora Grayson
- Leonora Corbett as Helaine Frank
- Davina Craig as Polly
- Jerry Verno as Hugo Guppy
- Eliot Makeham as Professor Grayson
- Alexander Sarner as Mr Vander
- Melville Crawford as Pete Voss
- Nigel Barrie as Colonel Lockwood
- Carl Melene as Monsieur Bruckner

== Reception ==
The Monthly Film Bulletin wrote: "Highly topical thriller. ... Noel Madison gives strength to the plot by his forceful and unscrupulous Dr. Klee, John Loder is somewhat too leisured and gentlemanly as Grant, and Belle Chrystall becomes submerged in a mere 'pretty daughter' part. But the film is very up to date in interest and there are many interesting and humorous scenes."

Kine Weekly wrote: "Espionage melodrama, deftly manufactured from a thrilling, hard-hitting formula. Romance and villainy are, of course, the principal ingredients, and these are paraded in suspenseful, exciting sequence. Topicality is an artful aid to effective presentation. The characterisations, particularly that contributed by Noel Madison, as villain, is [sic] good, and so are the production qualities. First-rate popular booking."

Picturegoer wrote: "There is plenty of punch in this cut-to-pattern spy melodrama ... Continuity is a little ragged at times, and generally the development tends to be ingenious. Nevertheless, the fanatic's attempts to gain possession of an anti-gas formula from a famous scientist, have popular thrills and there is a touch of the spectacular in a gas demonstration and an attempt on the scientist's life. Noel Madison is very good as Klee and John Loder sound as a Secret Service Agent. Belle Chrystall is an attractive heroine."

Picture Show wrote: "Although the well-worn theme of the Secret Service man who foils the attempts of a gang of spies to secure a secret formula is used as the basis of this melodrama, the inclusion of A.R.P. demonstrations gives it a dash of novelty. It is competently directed and acted."
