= Murder Will Out (1939 film) =

- Frederick Burtwell, Crystal Parzik and Jack Hawkins
- Directed by: Roy William Neill
- Written by: Austin Melford; Brock Williams; Derek Twist
- Story by: Roy William Neill
- Produced by: Roy William Neill
- Starring: John Loder; Jane Baxter; Jack Hawkins
- Production company: Warner Bros. First National Productions
- Distributed by: Warner Bros.
- Release date: August 1939
- Running time: 66 minutes
- Country: United Kingdom
- Language: English
- Budget: £17,319
- Box office: £13,349

Murder Will Out is a 1939 British comedy crime film directed by Roy William Neill, starring John Loder, Jane Baxter and Jack Hawkins. It was written by Austin Melford, Brock Williams and Derek Twist and released by Warner Brothers.

== Preservation status ==
The British Film Institute has classed Murder Will Out as a lost film, included in its "75 Most Wanted" list of missing British feature films. The BFI National Archive holds a collection of stills but no film or video materials.

== Plot ==
Jade collector Paul Raymond is given a piece by his friend Peter Stamp, who tells Raymond that attempts have previously been made to steal it. Later, Raymond and his wife Pamela see Stamp lying in the street, but his body disappears before they can reach it. Raymond's friend Morgan brings in an investigator named Campbell to assist, but both are later found in the same way as Stamp. When Pamela receives a note threatening to murder Raymond unless a ransom is paid, she agrees. The criminals – revealed to be Stamp, Morgan and Campbell – retrieve he money but while fleeing, their plane crashes.

== Cast ==
- John Loder as Dr. Paul Raymond
- Jane Baxter as Pamela Raymond
- Jack Hawkins as Stamp
- Hartley Power as Campbell
- Peter Croft as Nigel
- Frederick Burtwell as Morgan
- William Hartnell as Dick
- Ian McLean as Inspector

== Critical reception ==
The Monthly Film Bulletin wrote: "The atmosphere of mystery is well built up in the opening sequences, which are distinctly intriguing. There is no lack of incident throughout, but they become less gripping and the climax is abrupt and unimpressive. There is little scope for acting. John Loder and Jane Baxter make attractive leads, and Billy Hartnell is amusing as a cockney butler with a passion for canaries. The varied settings in China and London, including a now not-so-novel black-out, are effective."

Kine Weekly wrote: "Amusing and entertaining comedy mystery drama which is woven around a gang of ingenious blackmailers who attempt to extort money on the strength of bogus murders. The story itself is utterly incredible, but it is directed and acted with sufficient skill to keep one on the qui vive all the time. ... Although the drama is utterly impossible, and borders on the ridiculous, it is so well acted by a cast of competent and well-known players, and so skilfully directed, that it leads one up the garden before one is conscious of the incredibilities."

The Daily Film Renter wrote: "Plot trifle complicated, liberally garnished with dialogue, but usual red herring clues introduced, and climax should baffle all but observant patrons. Acceptable specimen of type for the populars."

TV Guide wrote: "Could have been a good film had more effort been placed in developing the plot; as it is, it's almost impossible to figure out what is going on."
