= The Mysterious Doctor =

1943 film by Benjamin Stoloff

- Theatrical release poster
- Directed by: Benjamin Stoloff
- Written by: Richard Weil
- Produced by: William Jacobs
- Starring: John Loder; Eleanor Parker; Bruce Lester; Lester Matthews; Forrester Harvey
- Cinematography: Henry Sharp
- Edited by: Clarence Kolster
- Music by: Howard Jackson; William Lava; Hans Sommer
- Production company: Warner Bros. Pictures
- Distributed by: Warner Bros. Pictures
- Release date: March 3, 1943
- Running time: 57 minutes
- Country: United States
- Language: English

The Mysterious Doctor is a 1943 American horror film directed by Benjamin Stoloff and written by Richard Weil. The film stars John Loder, Eleanor Parker, Bruce Lester, Lester Matthews and Forrester Harvey. The film was released by Warner Bros. Pictures on March 3, 1943.

== Plot ==
In a Cornish village during World War II, a German Nazi uses the disguise of a headless ghost to strike fear into the local tin mine workers.

Posing as a man the British Army has rejected for active duty, a mining engineer, Dr. Frederick Holmes, takes a week-long walking trip through Cornwall. The first time that we see Dr. Holmes, he is tramping about the foggy moors after dark and catches a ride with a peddler to Morgan's Head. He wants to know why local miners refuse to work a tin mine that could yield a valuable asset to the English war effort. Holmes learns that the villagers are not working the mine because they fear the ghost of a headless man who haunts the moors and the mine.

Eventually, the engineer exposes the ghost as a hoax. As it turns out, the village benefactor, Sir Harry Leland, has been masquerading as the headless ghost. Sir Harry explains that he is the offspring of German nobility who settled in England in the days of King George to supervise other Germans in the tin mines of Cornwall. He has turned the superstitious fears of the villagers against them to keep the mine out of operation. Sir Harry shoots a simple-minded villager who rushes him. He attacks Holmes, they struggle, and Sir Harry falls onto his knife and dies.

== Cast ==
- John Loder as Sir Henry Leland
- Eleanor Parker as Letty Carstairs
- Bruce Lester as Lt. Christopher 'Kit' Hilton
- Lester Matthews as Dr. Frederick Holmes
- Forrester Harvey as Hugh Penhryn
- Matt Willis as Bart Redmond

== Production and release ==
The film working title was The Mystery Doctor The Mysterious Doctor was released on 6 March 1943.

== Reception ==
The film critic Leonard Maltin awarded The Mystery Doctor two and a half out of four stars, commending the film's location shooting, but called the film's cast "adequate". On his website Fantastic Movie Musings and Ramblings, Dave Sindelar criticized the film's unconvincing special effects, obvious story twists, and the fact that the title character vanishes from the film after the first 20 minutes. Dennis Schwartz of Ozus' World Movie Reviews awarded the film a grade B−, commending the film's acting, and atmosphere, writing, "It's capably executed and gets off to a chilling beginning, but the tale is too far-fetched to be totally believed and soon falls back into being a routine small town crime drama." Richard Gilliam from Allmovie gave the film a negative review, writing, "Neither as atmospheric as the latter nor as clever as the former, the story marches through its 57 minutes with little deviation from formula." The Terror Trap awarded it 2.5 out of 4 stars, calling it "a sleepy, unpretentious 1940s ghost horror"
