= Hot Sands =

1924 film

- Directed by: Monty Banks; Herman C. Raymaker
- Produced by: Monty Banks; Harry Asher; Samuel V. Grand; Grand-Asher Films
- Starring: Monty Banks
- Distributed by: Grand-Asher Distributing
- Release date: February 29, 1924
- Running time: 2 reels
- Country: USA
- Language: Silent..English titles

Hot Sands is a 1924 silent film comedy short produced, directed by and starring Monty Banks. Herman C. Raymaker shares directing credit with Banks. It is preserved in the Library of Congress collection It can be found on some video and dvd outlets.

== Cast ==
- Monty Banks
- William Blaisdell as Detective Dick Harris
- James T. Kelley as Mr. Leffingwell, Banker
