= Robert Rietti =

English actor and director (1923–2015)

Robert Rietti OMRI
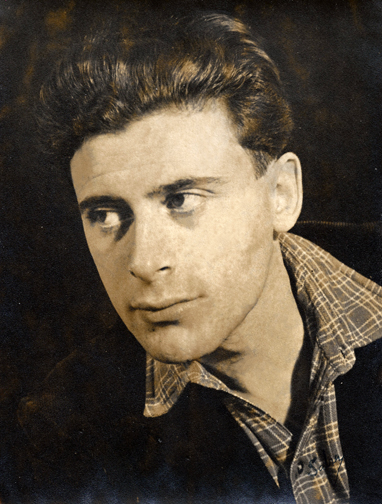
- Born: Lucio Herbert Rietti; 8 February 1923; Westminster, London, England
- Died: 3 April 2015 (aged 92); London, England
- Other names: Bobby Rietti; Robert Rietty
- Occupations: Actor; director; playwright; dubbing director
- Years active: 1933–2015
- Father: Victor Rietti

Robert Rietti, OMRI (born Lucio Herbert Rietti, sometimes Rietty; 8 February 1923 – 3 April 2015) was an English actor, translator, playwright, and dubbing director. With over 200 credits to his name, he had a highly prolific career in the British, American, and Italian entertainment industries. He was particularly prominent in post-production dubbing both foreign and domestic, often overseeing the English-language dubbing of foreign actors' dialogue. He is known for his dubbing work in the James Bond film series, Waterloo, the 1972 adaptation of Treasure Island, and Avalanche Express.

== Early life ==
Born in 1923, Rietti was the younger of two sons of Italian-Jewish actor Victor Rietti and Rachel Rosenay. In 1932, at the age of nine, he joined his father's company Teatro Italiano, making his stage debut in Mysterious Currents. His father (under whom Ida Lupino and June Duprez had studied acting) developed his son's acting career under the name Bobby Rietti. He made his motion picture debut as Fattorino in Monty Banks' comedy Heads We Go (1933). He soon caught the eye of David O. Selznick, who offered him an extended film contract. Despite letting down Alfred Hitchcock, who handpicked him to play the lead in Sabotage (1936), he made 17 motion pictures during the 1930s, remaining a popular child actor throughout that decade. They would later work together in Hitchcock's film Frenzy.

Rietti was also active on the stage. At the age of twelve he played Jonathan opposite Elisabeth Bergner in James Barrie's last play, The Boy David (1936), which dramatised the Biblical story of King Saul and the young David. Altogether, in his boyhood years he acted in eighteen films and over one hundred and twenty plays.

=== Second World War ===
His successful career on the stage and in motion pictures was interrupted by the outbreak of the Second World War. Rietti and his brother, being Italian, were interned at Ascot internment camp. He later joined the Rifle Brigade, but accepted the army's request for him to head "Stars in Battledress", a group of young actors, which included the young Peter Ustinov and Terry-Thomas, who toured England, and were flown throughout liberated Europe, to entertain Allied troops. In 1945, he was invited by John Gielgud to join his production of Hamlet for troops in the Far East. After the war, he returned to work in the theatre, films, radio, and the latest medium, early television.

== Career ==
=== Radio ===
In radio, he teamed up with Orson Welles in the radio series The Third Man (1951), and then again on the popular series The Black Museum (1952), which was broadcast to the US Armed Forces. This was to be the beginning of many collaborations between Rietti and Orson Welles, who remained close friends. He was also a regular on the radio series Horatio Hornblower (1952) with Michael Redgrave, The Scarlet Pimpernel (1952), Theatre Royal (1954) with Sir Laurence Olivier, and the classic Sherlock Holmes (1954) with John Gielgud and Ralph Richardson.

=== Television ===
His frequent work in television and many guest appearances made him a familiar face in the 1950s and 1960s. He is credited with 164 television appearances. He guest starred together with his father in The Jack Benny Program (1957) and in Harry's Girls (1960), which were both directed by his friend Ralph Levy, director of The Burns and Allen Show. They also performed together in three versions of his father's television success To Live in Peace and his father's television play Against the Stream (1959). In 1958, George Sanders presented Candle for the Madonna, an original television play Robert had written, in which Robert also played the lead.

Rietti (center) accepting the Honorary Doctorate of the Arts at the University of Florida in 2012

=== Films ===
Among the earliest of his film appearances were with Leslie Howard in The Scarlet Pimpernel and with Douglas Fairbanks in The Private Life of Don Juan (both 1934). Of his 83 film appearances throughout his career, he is best remembered for contribution to the original James Bond pictures: besides Sean Connery, he was the only actor who appeared in both Thunderball (1965) and the re-make Never Say Never Again (1983). Other popular films he appeared in include The Italian Job (1969), Sunday Bloody Sunday (1971), The Omen (1976), as well as a cameo in Hannibal (2001). He played Robert Grant in Hell Is Empty (1967) for his brother, the producer Ronald Rietti.

=== Dubbing ===
With the growing popularity of epic international films in the 1950s, Rietti gained a reputation for his work in dubbing. He began his involvement in Paris, during an actor's strike in Britain, and would eventually be hired for both performing and directing jobs. He was also responsible for bringing in the French rythmo-band system into the United Kingdom. Rietti directed ADR in more than 700 films and received international recognition as the foremost director in this field. He was nominated in Hollywood for the Golden Reel Award (a technical Oscar) for his ADR direction of the English version of Once Upon a Time in America (1984), in which he directed Robert De Niro's post syncing.

His own voice was used to re-voice Gregory Peck's German dialogue in The Guns of Navarone (1961); and Orson Welles' in Treasure Island (1972). His voice was used in eight of the James Bond films; his best known work in the series was replacing the voice of Adolfo Celi in Thunderball (1965) and Tetsurō Tamba in You Only Live Twice (1967). In the last ten films of Jack Hawkins, who had lost his voice to throat cancer, Hawkins was dubbed by Rietti.

=== Playwright ===
Rietti was also a prolific playwright who translated and adapted many Italian plays (notably those of Luigi Pirandello), from his native Italian into English. He also wrote several original plays which were produced on the stage, for television, and for radio. He founded and served as executive editor for 18 years of Gambit, a theatre quarterly which published international plays, including many of his own. In recognition of their contribution to the arts, he was knighted together with his father, Victor Rietti, by the Italian government in 1959. Rietti's title Cavaliere was upgraded in 1988 to Cavaliere Ufficiale.

In 1957, Rietti played Satan in the York Mystery Plays; one of these performances was attended by the Queen.

== Later life and death ==
In 2012, he received an Honorary Doctorate from the University of Florida for his lifetime achievements and contribution to the Arts. The year also marked an 80-year milestone for the then 89-year-old actor. Rietti remained active in his last years. He lectured to film students at film academies and universities, published an anthology of Italian Plays and was an active member of BAFTA.

Rietti died on 3 April 2015 in London, England, aged 92.

He is the father of Rabbi Jonathan Rietti, an educator and prominent speaker on Orthodox Judaism, most prominently for the international organisation Gateways.

== Selected filmography ==
- I Spy (1934)
- Girls Will Be Boys (1934)
- The Scarlet Pimpernel (1934)
- The Private Life of Don Juan (1934)
- In Town Tonight (1935)
- Emil and the Detectives (1935)
- Children of the Fog (1935)
- Runaway Ladies (1938)
- Call of the Blood (1949)
- Prelude to Fame (1950)
- The Black Rider (1954)
- They Who Dare (1954)
- Stock Car (1955)
- Mr. Arkadin (1955)
- Checkpoint (1956)
- The Truth About Women (1957)
- Tank Force (1958)
- Bluebeard's Ten Honeymoons (1960)
- Conspiracy of Hearts (1960)
- Sink the Bismarck (1960)
- The Story of Joseph and His Brethren (1961)
- Middle Course (1961)
- Time to Remember (1962)
- On the Beat (1962)
- The Scarlet Blade (1963)
- The Bible: In the Beginning... (1966) as Abraham's Steward
- The Italian Job (1969) as Turin Police Chief
- On Her Majesty's Secret Service (1969) as Casino Baccarat Official
- Sunday Bloody Sunday (1971)
- The Hiding Place (1975) as Willem ten Boom
- The Omen (1976) as Monk
- No Longer Alone (1976) as Joan's father
- Never Say Never Again (1983) as Italian Minister #1
- Madame Sousatzka (1988) as Leo Milev
- The March (1990) as Leo Borelli
- 30 Door Key (1991)
- Sherlock Holmes and the Leading Lady (1991, TV Movie) as Franz Hoffman
- The Sea Change (1998) as Luigi
- Hilary and Jackie (1998) as Italian Flunky
- Hannibal (2001) as Sogliato

== Voice-over filmography ==
=== As performer ===
Year	Title	Role	Ref.
1954	Ali Baba and the Forty Thieves	Ali Baba (Fernandel)	
1955	Land of the Pharaohs	Hamar (Alexis Minotis)	
1957	The Passionate Stranger	Carlo/Mario (Carlo Giustini)	
1957	Don Quixote	Carrasco (Georgy Vitsin)	
1960	The Savage Innocents	First Trooper (Peter O'Toole)	
1961	Taxi for Tobruk	Samuel Goldmann (Charles Aznavour)	
1962	Dr. No	John Strangways (Timothy Moxon) Police Superintendent Duff (William Foster-Davis)	
1962	The Devil and the Ten Commandments	Monsignor Trousselier (Lucien Baroux)	
1965	Thunderball	Emilio Largo (Adolfo Celi)	
1965	The Secret of My Success	President Esteda (Lionel Jeffries)	
1967	You Only Live Twice	Tiger Tanaka (Tetsurō Tamba)	
1967	The Prisoner	Number Two (8 episodes)	
1968	Barbarella	Professor Ping (Marcel Marceau)	
1969	The Red Tent	Finn Malmgren (Eduard Martsevich)	
1970	Waterloo	Thomas Picton (Jack Hawkins)	
1971	Nicholas and Alexandra	Count Fredericks (Jack Hawkins)	
1972	Treasure Island	Long John Silver (Orson Welles)	
1973	Hitler: The Last Ten Days	General Krebs (Adolfo Celi)	
1974	QB VII	Justice Gilroy (Jack Hawkins)	Part Three
1974	And Then There Were None	André Salvé (Adolfo Celi)	
1975	A Genius, Two Partners and a Dupe	Major Cabot (Patrick McGoohan)	
1976	Space: 1999	Luke Ferro (Orso Maria Guerrini) Sphere	
1976	The Water Margin	Voices	Episode 8 "A Man's Only Happiness"
1977	Cross of Iron	German officer	
1977	Gulliver's Travels	Voices	
1979	Avalanche Express	Gen. Marenkov (Robert Shaw)	
1982	Mozart	Wolfgang Amadeus Mozart (Christoph Bantzer)	4 episodes
1985	Anna Pavlova	Victor Dandré (James Fox)	
2001	Doctor Who: Death Comes to Time	Bedloe	

=== As director ===
Year	Title	Ref.
1966	Misunderstood	
1968–1970	Hector's House	
1969	The Red Tent	
1969	The Sorrow and the Pity	
1970	The Bird with the Crystal Plumage	
1972	I Love You Rosa	
1974	The Night Porter	
1976	The Tenant	
1976	The Memory of Justice	
1977	Jesus of Nazareth	
1981	Gregory's Girl	
1983	The Pinchcliffe Grand Prix	
1984	Once Upon a Time in America	
1985	Anna Pavlova	
1985	Christopher Columbus	
1987	Opera	
