= Noel Langley =

South African & American novelist, playwright, screenwriter and director (1911–1980)

- Born: 25 December 1911; Durban, KwaZulu-Natal, South Africa
- Died: 4 November 1980 (aged 68); Desert Hot Springs, California, United States
- Occupations: novelist; playwright; screenwriter; director
- Years active: 1935–1980

Noel Langley (25 December 1911 – 4 November 1980) was a South African-born (later naturalised American) novelist, playwright, screenwriter and director. He wrote the screenplay which formed the basis for the 1939 film The Wizard of Oz and is one of the three credited screenwriters for the film. His finished script for the film was revised by Florence Ryerson and Edgar Allan Woolf, the other credited screenwriters. Langley objected to their changes and lamented the final cut upon first seeing it, but later revised his opinion. He attempted to write a sequel based on The Marvelous Land of Oz using many of the concepts he had added to its predecessor, but this was never released.

== Life and career ==
Born on Christmas Day in Durban, South Africa, Langley was the son of Durban High School headmaster Aubrey Samuel Langley and Dora Agnes Allison. Noel Langley attended his father's school (Durban High School- KwaZulu-Natal, South Africa) until 1930. Langley's relationship with his headmaster father was a strained one as he did not meet his father's expectations. His father, Aubrey Samuel 'Madevu' (the isiZulu word for mustache), was a sensitive artist, strict disciplinarian and rugby football enthusiast, and valued boys who were physically active. He rejected his son, who was artistically inclined and physically weak (he was barred from sport and cadet drill by his doctor, Dr. George Campbell). Their relationship was so poor that Langley bragged to Jack Cope (a fellow Natalian, poet and novelist) after his father's death that he had helped kill his father by sending him money for drink.

He then studied at the University of Natal, from which he graduated with a BA in 1934. While at University, he began writing plays. His play Queer Cargo was produced by the Durban Repertory Theatre in 1932. Sailing for England, post-graduation, he by chance met a cousin of Charles Wyndham, the founder of London's Wyndham's Theatre. Queer Cargo was subsequently produced at Wyndham's Theatre where it ran for seven months. Langley wrote other plays for the West End stage in this period, which included For Ever and Farm of Three Echoes. His first big success came in 1935 with the publication of his first novel, Cage Me a Peacock, a satire set in ancient Rome. This was followed by another novel, There's a Porpoise Close Behind Us, and a children's book, The Land of Green Ginger, in 1936. Langley began writing for films in the 1930s, helping to write the British films King of the Damned and Secret of Stamboul. Langley then left London for Hollywood, having accepted a seven-year contract as a screenwriter for MGM.

At MGM, his first credited film was Maytime, a musical based on the 1917 operetta. In part due to the success of his own children's book The Land of Green Ginger, he was one of the screenwriters chosen for the job of adapting L. Frank Baum's children's novel The Wonderful Wizard of Oz for film. In 11 days, he provided a 43-page adaptation. Changes he introduced to the story are the inclusion of the actors playing the Tin Man, the Scarecrow, and the Lion characters as farmworkers in the sepia tone Kansas sequences as well as changing the color of Dorothy's shoes from silver to ruby. Langley also introduced Miss Almira Gulch, the Wicked Witch's Kansas counterpart. He then wrote a final draft. However, unbeknownst to him, MGM hired Florence Ryerson and Edgar Allan Woolf to do rewrites. However, producer Arthur Freed was displeased with their work and turned the script back over to Langley. Langley disliked their changes and removed many of them. He felt that their version was "so cutesy and oozy that I could have vomited." The final film was released in August 1939. Langley was dismayed by the result. He said, "I saw it in a cinema on Hollywood Boulevard at noon and I sat and cried like a bloody child." However, he amended his opinion when he saw the film for a second time in England during its 1949 re-release: "I thought, 'It's not a bad picture. Not a bad picture, you know'."

After World War II, during which he served in the Royal Canadian Navy, Langley worked on many British films. He also co-wrote the hit West End play Edward, My Son with Robert Morley. His film credits include the film noir They Made Me a Fugitive (1947), the remake of Tom Brown's Schooldays (1951), the Alastair Sim Scrooge (1951), The Pickwick Papers (1952), Ivanhoe (1952) and the Technicolor The Prisoner of Zenda (1952). (His contribution to Zenda, however, was limited; according to the American Film Institute, the 1952 film followed the shooting script of the 1937 film version, with only "slight variations" being added to the 1952 screenplay by Langley.) In June 1956, Langley was hired by Bryna Productions to re-write The Vikings for Kirk Douglas, but his script was not used.

In 1964, Langley made a series of tapes for New York radio station WBAI, reading The Tale of the Land of Green Ginger in its entirety. He subsequently edited it down to fit on an LP, which was issued by the listener-sponsored station and offered as a fund-raising premium. Langley continued to write novels and plays throughout his life. He also wrote short stories for the Saturday Evening Post and other magazines.

== Personal life ==
In 1937, Langley married Naomi Mary Legate (1913–1998) in Los Angeles, California. They had been a couple since his days in South Africa. The couple had five children but divorced in California in 1954. Noel Langley obtained custody of the children. Langley married actress Pamela Deeming in 1959. In 1961, Langley became a naturalised US citizen. In his later years, Langley worked part-time in drug rehabilitation. He died in 1980 in Desert Hot Springs, California, United States.

== Selected filmography ==
- King of the Damned (1935)
- Secret of Stamboul (1936)
- Maytime (1937)
- Marie Antoinette (1938)
- Queer Cargo (1938, based on his play)
- Listen, Darling (1938)
- The Wizard of Oz (1939)
- Babes in Arms (1939)
- Northwest Passage (1940)
- Florian (1940)
- Unexpected Uncle (1941)
- They Made Me a Fugitive (1947)
- The Vicious Circle (1948)
- Edward, My Son (1949, based on his play)
- Cardboard Cavalier (1949)
- Adam and Evelyne (1949)
- Trio (1950)
- Her Favourite Husband (1950)
- Honeymoon Deferred (1951)
- Scrooge (1951)
- Tom Brown's Schooldays (1951)
- Ivanhoe (1952)
- Father's Doing Fine (1952, based on his play)
- The Prisoner of Zenda (1952)
- The Pickwick Papers (1952)
- Our Girl Friday (1953)
- Knights of the Round Table (1953)
- Svengali (1954)
- The Vagabond King (1956)
- The Search for Bridey Murphy (1956)
- Snow White and the Three Stooges (1961)
- Pete's Dragon (1957–58 spec script; realized 1975 by Malcolm Marmorstein)

== Partial bibliography ==
- Cage Me a Peacock, Arthur Barker, 1935. A humorous historical novel set in Rome at the end of the Tarquin era. Became the basis for a musical in 1948.
- There's a Porpoise Close Behind Us, Arthur Barker, 1936. A comic drama about English theatre life.
- Three Plays, Arthur Barker, 1936. Farm of Three Echoes, For Ever, and Friendly Relations.
- The Land of Green Ginger, Arthur Barker, 1937. A book for children, concerning Abu Ali, the son of Aladdin.

- The Land of Green Ginger was rewritten for a new edition in 1966 and again in about 1975. In 1965, New York radio station WBAI recorded and broadcast Langley reading this story. A shortened version was issued on LP and offered as a fund-raising incentive.

- So Unlike The English, William Morrow, 1937.
- The Wizard of Oz, 1939, screenplay with Florence Ryerson and Edgar Allan Woolf.
- Hocus Pocus, Methuen, 1941. A humorous tale set in Hollywood.
- The Music of the Heart, Arthur Barker, 1946. A novel with a circus background.
- The Cabbage Patch, Arthur Barker, 1947. A comic drama about twenty-four hours in the life of Daisy, Lady Buckering.
- The True and Pathetic History of Desbarollda, The Waltzing Mouse, Lindsay Drummond, 1947. A children's book, illustrated by Edward Ardizzone.
- Nymph in Clover, Arthur Barker, 1948. The Lysistrata debacle retold.
- There's a Horse in My Tree, with Hazel Pynegar, Arthur Barker, 1948. A humorous book.
- Little Lambs Eat Ivy, Samuel French, 1950. A Light Comedy in Three Acts – produced 1948.
- Edward, My Son; A Play in Three Acts, with Robert Morley, French, 1948.
- Somebody's Rocking My Dreamboat, with Hazel Pynegar, Arthur Barker, 1949. A World War II novel about a group of women fleeing from England on a tramp steamer.
- The Inconstant Moon, Arthur Barker, 1949. The story of Dante and Beatrice.
- Tales of Mystery and Revenge, Arthur Barker, 1950.
- Scrooge, 1951, screenplay adaptation of A Christmas Carol.
- Cuckoo in the Dell, with Hazel Pynegar, Arthur Barker, 1951. A tale of a young Norman knight and moral idealism.
- The Rift in the Lute, also known as The Innocent at Large, Arthur Barker, 1952. An innocent boy finds a colourful, exotic world of "gay sinners" in ancient China.
- Where Did Everybody Go?, Arthur Barker, 1960. A story of a playwright.
- Snow White and the Three Stooges, 1961, screenplay with Elwood Ullman.
- An Elegance of Rebels, a play in three acts, Arthur Barker, 1960.
- The Loner, Triton Books, 1967.
- Edgar Cayce on Reincarnation, Hawthorn Books, 1968.
- A Dream of Dragonflies, Macmillan, 1971.
- The Return, Kessinger Publishing, 2005. A collection of Saturday Evening Post short stories.
- Desbarollda, the Waltzing Mouse, Durrant Publishing, 2006. A new edition.
