= Leueen MacGrath =

English actress and playwright (1914–1992)

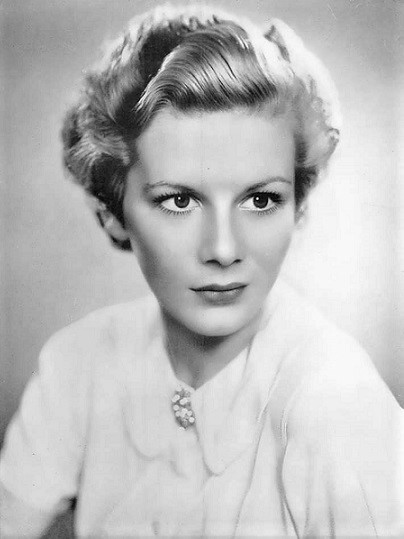
- Born: 3 July 1914; London, England
- Died: 27 March 1992 (aged 77); London, England
- Education: Royal Academy of Dramatic Art
- Occupations: Actress, playwright
- Years active: 1936–1974
- Spouses: Christopher Burn (m. 19??-??) Desmond Davis (19??-??); George S. Kaufman (m. 1949; div. 1957) Stephen Goodyear (19??-??): Stephen Quinto (19??-??)

Leueen MacGrath (3 July 1914 – 27 March 1992) was an English actress and playwright and the second wife of George S. Kaufman, from 1949 until their divorce in 1957.

== Early years ==
Born in London, England, MacGrath was a graduate of the Royal Academy of Dramatic Art.

== Career ==
MacGrath (pronounced mac-GRAW) began her acting career with a small role in the 1936 British film Whom the Gods Love, a biopic about Mozart and his wife Constanze. She followed this with Pygmalion and a series of B-movies, including All Hands, Meet Maxwell Archer, and The Saint's Vacation.

MacGrath made her Broadway debut in 1948 in the play Edward, My Son (1948); she reprised her role (which she also had in the play's London production) in the film adaptation the following year. During this time she began a relationship with playwright and director George S. Kaufman. They married on 26 May 1949. Kaufman directed her in Jean Giraudoux's The Enchanted at the Lyceum, which closed after 45 performances. In 1951 she collaborated with Kaufman and Heywood Hale Broun on the writing of The Small Hours, which closed after 20 performances. The following year she and her husband scripted the even less successful play about reincarnation, Fancy Meeting You Again in which she starred with a young Walter Matthau and which ran for only 8 performances. The couple finally achieved a hit in 1955 with Silk Stockings, the Cole Porter musical for which they co-wrote the book with Abe Burrows. She returned to acting for Giraudoux's Tiger at the Gates and The Potting Shed.

Having settled in the United States following her marriage to Kaufman, MacGrath appeared in a number of American anthology television series popular in the 1950s, including The Philco Television Playhouse, Studio One, Lux Video Theatre, The United States Steel Hour, The Alcoa Hour, and Hallmark Hall of Fame.

== Personal life ==
MacGrath married Kaufman on 26 May 1949, at Kaufman's home in Bucks County, Pennsylvania. They collaborated on several scripts and productions together. They divorced in 1957 and McGrath returned to the United Kingdom. In 1958 she returned to New York to help tend Kaufman after his second stroke, but declined to remarry him. Subsequently, she resumed her career in the United States.

She was married five times. In addition to Kaufman, her husbands were Christopher Burn, Desmond Davis, Stephen Goodyear, and Stephen Quinto.

== Death ==
On 27 March 1992, MacGrath died of complications from a stroke at her home in London at the age of 77. She was survived by a sister and a stepdaughter.

== Filmography ==
Year	Title	Role	Notes
1936	Whom the Gods Love	Josefa Weber	
1938	Pygmalion	Clara	
1940	Meet Maxwell Archer	Sarah	
1941	The Saint's Vacation	Valerie	
1949	Edward, My Son	Eileen Perrin	
1955	Three Cases of Murder	Woman in the House	(segment "In the Picture")
