= 18 Minutes =

1935 film by Monty Banks

- Original trade ad
- Directed by: Monty Banks
- Screenplay by: Fred Thompson
- Story by: Gregory Ratoff
- Produced by: Gregory Ratoff
- Starring: Gregory Ratoff; John Loder; Benita Hume
- Cinematography: Jack Cox; Geoffrey Faithfull
- Edited by: Emile de Ruelle
- Music by: Alexis Arkhangelsky
- Production company: Walton Studios
- Distributed by: Pathé Pictures Ltd. (UK)
- Release date: 8 April 1935 (London)
- Running time: 88 minutes
- Country: United Kingdom
- Language: English

18 Minutes (also known as Eighteen Minutes and This Woman Is Mine) is a 1935 British drama film directed by Monty Banks and starring Gregory Ratoff, John Loder and Benita Hume. It was written by Fred Thompson based on a story by Ratoff, andshot at Walton Studios near London.

== Plot ==
Synopsis based on the shortened version, titled The King of the Circus.

Lion tamer Nikita learns that another lion tamer named Marco has been killed by the lioness Caprice. Nikita buys Caprice for the notoriety. Marco's daughter Lida does not want to go to an orphanage, so he takes her back with him to Paris. When he goes to do his act, he tells Lida that it lasts exactly 18 minutes. He tours the world, traveling to London, Rome in 1927, Berlin in 1929, Buenos Aires in 1931, Vienna in 1933 and back to Paris in 1935.

However, "Papa" Korn, the impresario of the Cirque D'Hiver, the Paris circus that stars Nikita, has signed a rival act, the young magician Trelawney. Nikita tells Korn that there is only one headliner, him. When Trelawney tries to become better acquainted with the now-adult Lida, Nikita punches him in the face. Afterward, dreading the thought of losing her, he asks Lida to marry him. He takes her shock for acceptance, though she does not want him for a husband. Nevertheless, they get married, and she hides her true feelings.

At the reception, Nikita becomes furious when Trelawney shows up. After Korn takes Nikita away for a talk, Trelawney dances with Lida. When he tells her she must be happy being in love, she runs away. He follows and finds her crying. She makes him promise not to tell anyone.

Returning from another world tour, Nikita is angered to find that Trelawney is now the headliner of the Cirque D'Hiver and has been assigned his dressing room. Korn informs Nikita that the public has tired of his act, so Nikita tells Korn he will do a dangerous stunt that has never been performed before. He will go into the cage with Caprice with his hands handcuffed behind his back. After many attempts, he perfects his act.

Meanwhile, Trelawney tells Lida he loves her. When he kisses her, she does not object, though she runs away afterward. Pietro, Nikita's longtime assistant, discovers the truth and, in a desperate attempt to stop Nikita from debuting the stunt, informs his master that Lida is with Trelawney in his dressing room. Nikita breaks into the dressing room and fights with Trelawney. When the men are separated, Lida confesses she loves Trelawney. Broken, Nikita returns to the ring, but after he handcuffs himself, he turns his back to Caprice. The lioness pounces on him.

== Cast ==
- Gregory Ratoff as Nikita
- John Loder as Trelawney
- Benita Hume as Lady Phyllis Pilcott
- Katharine Sergava as Lida
- Richard Bennett as Korn
- Hugh Wakefield as Lord Pilcott
- Paul Graetz as Pietro
- Rosamund Barnes as Lida as a child
- Carl Harbord as Jacques
- Margaret Yarde as Marie
- Hal Gordon as Osso

== Critical reception ==
The Monthly Film Bulletin wrote: "This is Gregory Ratoff's play; he wrote the story, and his role as lion-tamer dominates the play; it is strong, elemental, even grim, with the snarl of lions as a sort of undertone, the circus oddities, generosities, and rivalries as orchestration, and the blind urge to mastery as tragic lief-motif. With no false note of sentiment, or psychology, no irrelevant shot, no deficiency of casting, of acting, photography, or music – the play grips from beginning to end – a masterly production of screen drama. But it is not a play for children, nor for those whose nerves are not tuned up to facing the grimmer side of life's workings."

Variety wrote: "This is one of the best pictures ever made in England, It is atmospheric, exciting and absorbingly interesting throughout. It is a good story, well told, splendidly played and well directed. ... Gregory Ratoff gives a fine performance as the domineering lion-tamer. John Loder has an unsympathetic role in the part of Treawney and the young wife is effectively played by Katherine Sergava. One of the outstanding hits is that of Rosamund Barnes, who plays the orphan child before she grows up. An intelligently conceived and played part of the circus proprietor is contributed by Richard Bennett."

TV Guide rated the film three out of five stars, describing it as an "Interesting drama, way above average for British films of the time."
