= The Tale of the Land of Green Ginger =

1937 children's book by Noel Langley

Land of Green Ginger
- First edition
- Author: Noel Langley
- Language: English
- Genre: Children's Literature, Satire
- Publisher: Arthur Barker Limited
- Publication date: 1937
- Publication place: United States
- Media type: Print (Hardback, 1 volume)

The Tale of the Land of Green Ginger is a 1937 book for children by Noel Langley. (Later editions shortened the title to The Land of Green Ginger.) The book was originally illustrated by the author. In 1966, it was re-illustrated with Edward Ardizzone's now classic illustrations. It tells the story of Abu Ali, the son of Aladdin (who is now emperor of China). Abu Ali's first words are "Button-nosed tortoise", which immediately mark him out as fated to perform an important task when he grows up. On reaching maturity, Abu Ali duly sets out on his quest (the hero's journey), has various adventures, and struggles to do good whilst foiling the schemes of the Wicked Princes, Rubdub Ben Thud and Tintac Ping Foo.

The book was adapted for television on Shirley Temple's Storybook.

The book is one of the first by a modern writer to tell the story of what happens in the world of a fairy tale after "they all lived happily ever after", and is particularly highly regarded for its amusing word-play.

The book was a big enough success that it encouraged MGM to hire Langley to adapt another children's book, The Wonderful Wizard of Oz, for the 1939 film.

The story was read by Kenneth Williams for the BBC's Jackanory in December 1968.

The story inspired a track by The Orb for their 2004 album Bicycles & Tricycles.
