= Meet Maxwell Archer =

- Original British trade ad
- Directed by: John Paddy Carstairs
- Written by: Katherine Strueby
- Based on: the novel Archer Plus Twenty by Hugh Clevely
- Produced by: William Sistrom
- Starring: John Loder
- Cinematography: Claude Friese-Greene
- Edited by: Alan Jaggs
- Music by: W.L. Trytel (uncredited)
- Production company: RKO Radio British Productions
- Distributed by: RKO Radio Pictures (UK)
- Release date: 17 February 1940 (UK)
- Running time: 73 minutes
- Country: United Kingdom
- Language: English
- Budget: £18,226

Meet Maxwell Archer is a 1940 British comedy mystery film directed by John Paddy Carstairs and starring John Loder, Leueen MacGrath and Athole Stewart. It was written by Katherine Strueby based on the 1938 novel Archer Plus 20 by Hugh Clevely. It was released in the U.S. in 1942 as Maxwell Archer, Detective.

== Plot summary ==
Maxwell Archer, a private detective, attempts to clear a young man wrongly accused of murder.

== Cast ==
- John Loder as Maxwell Archer
- Leueen MacGrath as Sarah
- Athole Stewart as Superintendent Gordon
- Marta Labarr as Nina
- George Merritt as Inspector Cornell
- Ronald Adam as Nicolides
- Peter Hobbes as George Gull Jr.
- Ralph Roberts as George Gull Sr.
- Syd Crossley as Perkins
- Barbara Everest as Miss Duke

== Critical reception ==
The Monthly Film Bulletin wrote: "This acceptable mixture of espionage and crime is put over in the popular manner with comedy and romance. The opening is rather jerky, but once the problem is posed the pace is swift, and suspense and interest are maintained to the exciting climax. The cast acts well together. John Loder makes an upstanding typical sleuth of the Raffles brand, and Leucen MacGrath appears to have acting ability as well as good looks. The technical presentation is good."

Kine Weekly wrote: "The opening sequences are a little sketchy, but the air is quickly cleared once the exciting plot gets into its stride. From the half-way mark onwards the film is responsible for romance, laughter and thrills in plenty. Its rattling good entertainment is aided and abetted by eager teamwork and impeccable technical presentation, Maxwell Archer is entitled to take his place with the Saint, Raffles and other immortals of comedy crime fiction."

Picturegoer wrote: "The opening sequences are a trifle sketchy, but once the story gets under way it is seldom dull, while the thrills are helped out by ample comedy relief and pleasant romance. Leueen MacGrath reveals an interesting personality as well as acting ability as Sarah and Ronald Adam, Syd Crossley and Peter Halliwell stand out among the other cast members."

TV Guide wrote, "Oh where is Sherlock Holmes when you need him? Poorly made with a dopey script that gives the actors little room to breathe, let alone act."

In British Sound Films: The Studio Years 1928–1959 David Quinlan rated the film as "average", writing: "Unsubtle but swift paced thriller."
