= Monty Banks =

Italian comedian and director (1897–1950)

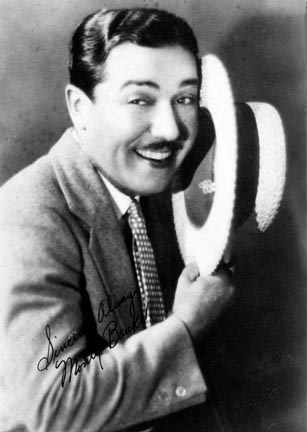
- Born: Mario Bianchi; 18 July 1897; Cesena, Kingdom of Italy
- Died: 7 January 1950 (aged 52); Arona, Piedmont, Italy
- Occupations: Comedian; actor; director; producer
- Years active: 1916–1945
- Spouses: Gladys Frazin (m. 1929; div. 1932) Gracie Fields (m. 1940)

Montague (Monty) Banks (born Mario Bianchi; 18 July 1897 – 7 January 1950) was a 20th century Italian-born American comedian, film actor, director and producer who achieved success in the US and UK.

== Early life, family and education ==
Banks was born Mario Bianchi in Cesena, Italy. In 1914, he emigrated to the US. After moving to England to expand his career in film direction and production, the events of the second World War would bring Banks back to the United States later in life.

== Career ==
He initially performed on the New York stage. By 1918, he was an actor in Hollywood with the Arbuckle Company, performing in over 35 silent short comedies by the early 1920s, and then, starring in feature-length action comedy-thrillers as Play Safe (1927). (A large excerpt from this movie is included in Robert Youngson's compilation film Days of Thrills and Laughter (1961) and the car-to-train transfer stunt explained in the 1980 documentary series Hollywood).

Like Harold Lloyd, the comedy-thrillers he produced were popular but became increasingly risky. Banks was seriously injured after being roped to the back of a car and dragged down a cliff face.

With the arrival of sound films, Banks's strong Italian accent forced him to phase out his acting career in favor of working as a gagman and director. Credited as Montague Banks, he directed Laurel and Hardy in their film Great Guns.

By the 1930s, he had relocated to the UK where he produced and directed "quota quickies" for the comedy team of Leslie Fuller and Syd Courtenay, and later the breakthrough films of George Formby and Gracie Fields. After Warner Bros. purchased Teddington Studios outright in 1934, he directed (and occasionally acted in) various comedies and crime stories intended for UK release only, featuring actors such as Douglas Fairbanks Jr., Edmund Gwenn and Margaret Lockwood.

Banks subsequently became an associate producer at 20th Century Fox.

== Honors and awards ==
In his hometown Cesena, the foundation Aula Didattica Monty Banks was created in his honor. It is "an initiative promoted by the municipality, the course is open to all and provides the opportunity to create videos".

French comic artist Louis Forton created a 1925-1927 celebrity comic, Ploum, of which the title character was physically modelled after Monty Banks.

== Personal life ==
Banks held dual Italian and American citizenship. He was married to American actress Gladys Frazin. The marriage resulted in divorce on 29 April 1932 as a result of her abusive behaviour. She subsequently committed suicide in March 1939.

Banks met British singer and actress Gracie Fields in 1935, subsequently directing her in four of her films, and they married in March 1940. As an Italian national, he would have been classified as an 'enemy alien' in Britain during World War II. Consequently, he and Fields left the UK for Canada initially, and then the neutral United States in order to prevent his internment. Italian American internment also came into place in the US during 1941 and 1942, affecting thousands of Italians, but this was eventually relaxed.

He died, reportedly in the arms of Fields, while traveling on the Orient Express train just outside Arona, Italy, of a heart attack, aged 52.

== Selected filmography ==
=== Actor ===
- A Scrap of Paper (1918)
- The Sheriff (1918)
- Camping Out (1919)
- Love (1919)
- Too Much Johnson (1919)
- Hot Sands (1924)
- Racing Luck (1924)
- Atta Boy (1926)
- Horse Shoes (1927)
- Flying Luck (1927)
- Play Safe (1927); a reduced, two-reel version showing only the train chase was released the same year as Chasing Choo Choos
- Adam's Apple (1928)
- A Perfect Gentleman (1928)
- Weekend Wives (1928)
- Atlantic (1929)
- You Made Me Love You (1933)
- Heads We Go (1933)
- The Girl in Possession (1934)
- Falling in Love (1935)
- So You Won't Talk (1935)
- Blood and Sand (1941)
- A Bell for Adano (1945)

=== Director ===
- Hot Sands (1924)
- Cocktails (1928)
- Why Sailors Leave Home (1930)
- The Black Hand Gang (1930)
- The Compulsory Husband (1930)
- Almost a Honeymoon (1930)
- What a Night! (1931)
- Old Soldiers Never Die (1931)
- The Wife's Family (1931)
- Poor Old Bill (1931)
- Not So Quiet on the Western Front (1932)
- Love and Luck (1932)
- Kiss Me Sergeant (1932)
- Money for Nothing (1932)
- For the Love of Mike (1932)
- Tonight's the Night (1932)
- Leave It to Me (1933)
- You Made Me Love You (1933)
- Heads We Go (1933)
- Your Smile (1934)
- Father and Son (1934)
- The Church Mouse (1934)
- Man of the Moment (1935)
- Falling in Love (1935) (also acted)
- Hello, Sweetheart (1935)
- 18 Minutes (1935)
- No Limit (1935)
- Keep Your Seats, Please (1936)
- Queen of Hearts (1936)
- We're Going to Be Rich (1938)
- Keep Smiling (1938)
- Shipyard Sally (1939)
- Great Guns (1941)
