= Little Museum of Dublin =

Local history museum in Ireland

- Músaem Beag Bhaile Átha Cliath
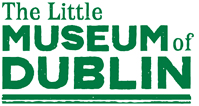

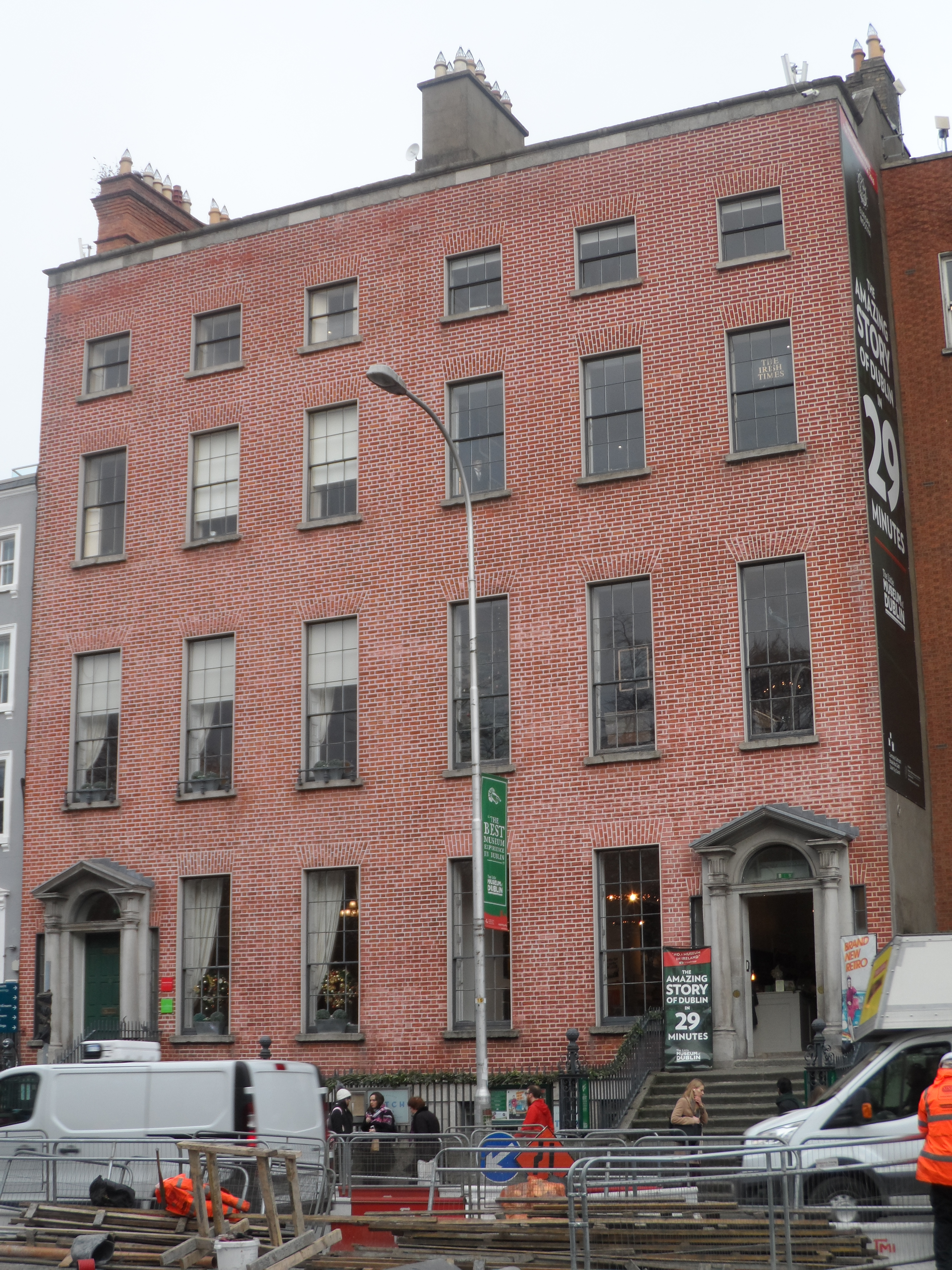
- Museum building at 15 St Stephen's Green in Dublin

- Location within Central Dublin
- Established: October 2011
- Location: 15 St Stephen's Green, Dublin, Ireland
- Coordinates: 53.3395°N 6.2582°W
- Type: Local history museum, urban museum
- Founder: Trevor White
- Director: Trevor White
- Public transit access: St. Stephen's Green (Luas Green Line)
- Website: littlemuseum.ie

The Little Museum of Dublin is a local history museum situated at St Stephen's Green, Dublin, Ireland. The museum, which is located in an 18th-century Georgian townhouse owned by Dublin City Council, aims to present the "social and cultural history of Dublin through everyday items donated by members of the public".

== History ==
The Little Museum, the "brainchild" of director Trevor White, was formed in April 2011 and officially opened its doors to the public in October of the same year. The Little Museum is a registered charity. Its patrons include Dublin City Council, the Department of Culture, Heritage and the Gaeltacht, the Matheson Foundation, and The Ireland Funds.

An Irish Times article of May 2013 listed the Little Museum as the "best museum experience in Dublin". In 2014, TripAdvisor awarded the museum with a Certificate of Excellence for the third year in a row. In February 2014 the museum won a "David Manley Emerging Entrepreneur Award" in the Arts category. As of 2026, it was ranked #1 on TripAdvisor's "things to do in Dublin".

The museum was temporarily closed in April 2024, for major maintenance and improvement works, and a selection from its exhibits was established at a "pop-up" location on Pembroke Street for a period. The museum reopened fully on St Stephen's Green in June 2025, after the investment of over 4 million euro.

== Collection and operation ==
As a local history museum for the city of Dublin, the Little Museum chronicles the history of the city in the 20th century and provides visitors with information on life in Dublin during that time period. The museum has a collection of over 6,000 artefacts that have largely been donated or loaned directly from the people of Dublin. The collection includes a stained glass panel of St. Brendan, dated to c. 1920, which is attributed to Irish artist Harry Clarke. The small panel was rescued from a skip by Peter Pearson, and some pieces are missing. In 2014, the museum purchased an archive of work by artist and poet Christy Brown. As of 19 March 2014, the Little Museum and the National Library of Ireland were the joint owners of a collection that includes private letters and previously unseen sketches, paintings, and poems. The collection was sold by Bonhams in London for nearly 45,000 euro.

The museum has three floors of exhibition space in the Georgian townhouse and one floor for office space. Visits are by guided tour only. Exhibitions in the museum include displays covering the 1916 Rising, U.S. President John F. Kennedy's visit to Dublin, and many other events in Irish political and social history. In 2014 the museum opened an exhibit on the rock band U2. The museum also hosts the Tara's Palace doll house. There is a small staff along with a team of guides.

== Other programmes ==
In June 2011, the Little Museum launched an initiative called "City of a Thousand Welcomes". The goal of this initiative was to show the "warmth of local Dubliners" to visitors to the city, by connecting first-time visitors to Dublin with hospitable locals. Over 1,000 such local "ambassadors" were sought to advise visitors on "underestimated" attractions in Dublin, and included historians, teachers, writers and other ordinary city residents. The program, a "civic initiative", aimed to connect first-time visitors to Dublin with a local ambassador who would welcome them by taking them out for a cup of tea or a pint. As of 2021, as part of the response to the COVID-19 pandemic in Ireland, this initiative was not active.

The museum also offers "I Love Dublin" classes for school children ages 6–17.

== Gallery ==
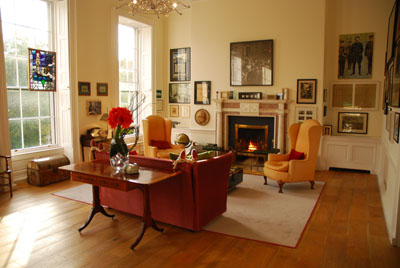
Front Room of the museum

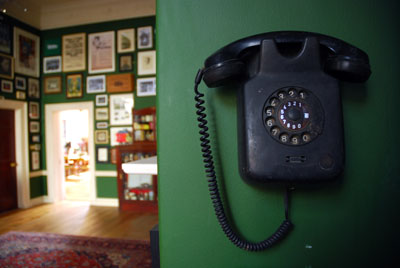
Telephone display in the Treasury Room

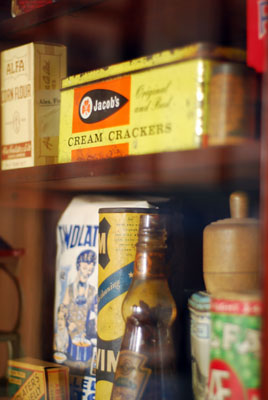
Groceries display in Treasury Room

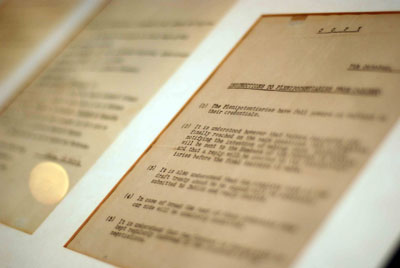
Rare decree of plenipotentiaries signed by Eamon De Valera under the heading Anglo Irish treaty

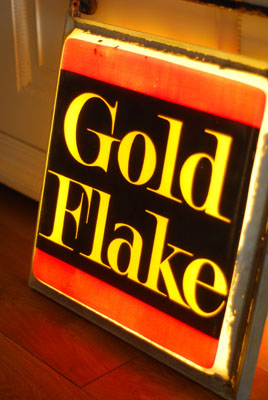
Gold flake lightbox

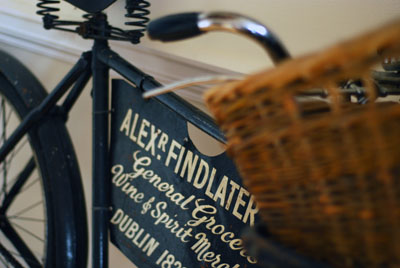
Messenger bike
