= You Made Me Love You (film) =

1933 film by Monty Banks

- Directed by: Monty Banks
- Screenplay by: Frank Launder
- Story by: Stanley Lupino
- Based on: The Taming of the Shrew by William Shakespeare
- Produced by: John Maxwell
- Starring: Stanley Lupino; Thelma Todd; John Loder
- Cinematography: John J. Cox
- Edited by: A.S. Bates
- Music by: Noel Gay; Stanley Lupino; Clifford Grey
- Production company: British International Pictures
- Distributed by: Wardour Films
- Release date: 3 August 1933 (London)
- Running time: 74 minutes
- Country: United Kingdom
- Language: English

You Made Me Love You is a 1933 British comedy film directed by Monty Banks and starring Stanley Lupino, Thelma Todd and John Loder. The plot is a modern reworking of William Shakespeare's The Taming of the Shrew.

== Cast ==
- Stanley Lupino as Tom Daly
- Thelma Todd as Pamela Berne
- John Loder as Harry Berne
- Gerald Rawlinson as Jerry
- James Carew as Oliver Berne
- Charles Mortimer as Mr Daly
- Hugh E. Wright as Father
- Charlotte Parry as Mother
- Arthur Rigby as Brother
- Syd Crossley as Bleak
- Monty Banks as Taxi Driver
