= Trevor White (writer) =

Irish food critic, publisher, writer and museum director

- Born: Dublin, Ireland
- Education: Trinity College Dublin
- Occupations: Writer; publisher; food critic; museum director

Trevor White is an Irish writer, publisher, food critic and museum director. Born in Dublin, he worked as an editor at Food & Wine and launched The Dubliner magazine in 2001. White published the magazine for eight years before selling it to another publisher in November 2008. In 2011 he created the civic initiative "City of a Thousand Welcomes" and the Little Museum of Dublin.

== Personal life ==
He is married to Susan Jane Murray, a nutritional cook who writes a regular column for The Sunday Independent and has often featured on Tom Dunne's show on Newstalk radio.

White's family were involved in the hospitality industry with his father, Peter White, owning White's on the Green restaurant on St Stephen's Green. Later Shanahan's restaurant operated from the same premises.

White is of Ashkenazi Jewish descent on his father's side.

== Career ==
=== The Dubliner 100 Best Restaurants ===
White also published The Dubliner 100 Best Restaurants Guide, and it became the best-selling restaurant guide in Ireland. In 2008 restaurant critic Ernie Whalley wrote, "It would be more correct to call the much-hyped annual 'Dublin's 30 Good and 70 Very Average Restaurants'.

=== Little Museum of Dublin ===
In 2011, White opened a non-profit museum of Dublin on St Stephen's Green. The Little Museum of Dublin tells the story of Dublin in a collection created at least partly by public donation and focusing on the 20th century. In 2019, the Little Museum won the TripAdvisor Travellers Choice Award for the second time.

=== City of a Thousand Welcomes ===
In 2011, the Little Museum launched a civic initiative called City of a Thousand Welcomes. It is a greeting service that sees volunteer Dubliners welcome visitors to the city by bringing them out for an informal chat over a free cup of tea or a pint. It was hoped that the initiative would attract 1000 volunteers to sign up as Dublin Ambassadors within three months. The Irish Times reported that the target was reached within 24 hours.

In July 2011, The Boston Globe reported that "one of the goals of the project… is to stamp out… cynicism and encourage Dubliners to embrace their history of connecting with others by welcoming them."

=== Other works ===
White is the author of Kitchen Con (2006), a social history of restaurant criticism, and The Dubliner Diaries (2010), an account of his time as a magazine publisher.

In 2017, Alfie: The Life and Times of Alfie Byrne, was published by Penguin Ireland. Reviewing the book, Taoiseach Leo Varadkar wrote, "Trevor White brings Alfie Byrne vividly to life in the pages of his elegant new biography." Broadcaster Joe Duffy called it "the definitive biography of the definitive Dubliner."

White has written several works for the stage. In September 2015, his debut play, The Private View: Fairytales of Ireland 1916–2016, was described by The Sunday Independent as "the most talked-about debut of the year."

For the 2019 Dublin Theatre Festival, White co-wrote a play, You Can Leave at Any Time, about the life of Mary Merritt, who spent 14 years in High Park Magdalene laundry. In the Sunday Times, critic Fiona Charleton called it "a profoundly affecting experience that illustrates past horrors with dignity."
