= List of British films of 1931 =

British films of 1931

A list of British films released in 1931. By this point the British film industry had completed the conversion from silent to sound films. Prominent British production companies included British International Pictures and Gainsborough Pictures. The requirements of the 1927 Film Act led a number of American companies to produce or distribute films in Britain, including a growing number of quota quickies.

== A-L ==
Title	Director	Cast	Genre	Notes
77 Park Lane	Albert de Courville	Dennis Neilson-Terry, Betty Stockfeld, Malcolm Keen	Crime	
Alibi	Leslie S. Hiscott	Austin Trevor, Elizabeth Allan, Franklin Dyall	Drama	
Almost a Divorce	Jack Raymond, Arthur Varney	Margery Binner, Sydney Howard, Kay Hammond	Comedy	
The Beggar Student	Victor Hanbury, John Harvel	Margaret Halstan, Frederick Lloyd, Jerry Verno	Musical	
The Bells	Oscar Werndorff, Harcourt Templeman	Donald Calthrop, Jane Welsh, Edward Sinclair	Drama	
Bill's Legacy	Harry Revier	Leslie Fuller, Mary Clare, Syd Courtenay	Comedy	
Black Coffee	Leslie S. Hiscott	Austin Trevor, Elizabeth Allan, Richard Cooper	Crime	
Bracelets	Sewell Collins	Bert Coote, Joyce Kennedy, Stella Arbenina	Drama	
Brown Sugar	Leslie S. Hiscott	Constance Carpenter, Francis Lister, Chili Bouchier	Drama	
Cape Forlorn	E. A. Dupont	Fay Compton, Frank Harvey, Ian Hunter, Donald Calthrop	Drama	
Captivation	John Harvel	Betty Stockfeld, Conway Tearle, Violet Vanbrugh	Romantic comedy	
Carmen	Cecil Lewis	Marguerite Namara, Lester Matthews, Mary Clare	Musical	
Carnival	Herbert Wilcox	Matheson Lang, Chili Bouchier, Joseph Schildkraut, Kay Hammond	Drama	
The Chance of a Night Time	Herbert Wilcox, Ralph Lynn	Ralph Lynn, Winifred Shotter, Sunday Wilshin	Comedy	
Chin Chin Chinaman	Guy Newall	Leon M. Lion, Elizabeth Allan, George Curzon	Romantic drama	
City of Song	Carmine Gallone	Jan Kiepura, Betty Stockfeld, Heather Angel	Musical	
Contraband Love	Sidney Morgan	C. Aubrey Smith, Haddon Mason, Rosalinde Fuller	Romantic drama	
Creeping Shadows	John Orton	Franklin Dyall, Margot Grahame, Jeanne Stuart	Crime	
Dance Pretty Lady	Anthony Asquith	Ann Casson, Carl Harbord, Moore Marriott	Drama	
Dangerous Seas	Edward Dryhurst	Julie Suedo, Gerald Rawlinson, Wallace Bosco	Drama	
Deadlock	George King	Stewart Rome, Marjorie Hume, Esmond Knight	Thriller	
Dr. Josser K.C.	Norman Lee	Ernie Lotinga, Molly Lamont, Binnie Barnes	Comedy	
Down River	Peter Godfrey	Charles Laughton, Jane Baxter, Harold Huth	Crime	
Dreyfus	Milton Rosmer	Cedric Hardwicke, George Merritt, Garry Marsh	Drama	
East Lynne on the Western Front	George Pearson	Herbert Mundin, Alf Goddard, Mark Daly	Comedy	
The Eternal Feminine	Arthur Varney	Terence De Marney, Guy Newall, Jill Esmond	Romantic comedy	
Fascination	Miles Mander	Madeleine Carroll, Carl Harbord, Kay Hammond	Drama	
The Flying Fool	Walter Summers	Henry Kendall, Benita Hume, Wallace Geoffrey	Thriller	
A Gentleman of Paris	Sinclair Hill	Arthur Wontner, Vanda Gréville, Hugh Williams	Crime	
The Ghost Train	Walter Forde	Jack Hulbert, Cicely Courtneidge, Ann Todd	Comedy/mystery	Adapted from Arnold Ridley's The Ghost Train
The Girl in the Night	Henry Edwards	Henry Edwards, Dorothy Boyd, Sam Livesey	Crime	
Glamour	Seymour Hicks, Harry Hughes	Seymour Hicks, Ellaline Terriss, Margot Grahame	Romantic drama	
The Great Gay Road	Sinclair Hill	Stewart Rome, Frank Stanmore, Pat Paterson	Drama	
Guilt	Reginald Fogwell	James Carew, Anne Grey, Harold Huth	Romance	
The Happy Ending	Millard Webb	Benita Hume, George Barraud, Anne Grey	Drama	
Her Reputation	Sidney Morgan	Iris Hoey, Frank Cellier, Lillian Hall-Davis	Comedy drama	
Hindle Wakes	Victor Saville	Belle Chrystall, John Stuart, Norman McKinnel	Drama	
Hobson's Choice	Thomas Bentley	James Harcourt, Viola Lyel, Frank Pettingell	Comedy	
The House of Unrest	Leslie Howard Gordon	Dorothy Boyd, Malcolm Keen, Leslie Perrins	Thriller	
The House Opposite	Walter Summers	Henry Kendall, Frank Stanmore, Arthur Macrae	Crime	
In a Lotus Garden	Fred Paul	H. Agar Lyons, Roy Galloway, Jocelyn Yeo	Musical comedy	
Inquest	G. B. Samuelson	Campbell Gullan, Mary Glynne, Sidney Morgan	Crime	
Jealousy	G.B. Samuelson	Lilian Oldland, Malcolm Keen, Harold French	Drama	
Let's Love and Laugh	Richard Eichberg	Gene Gerrard, Muriel Angelus, Frank Stanmore	Comedy	
The Love Habit	Harry Lachman	Seymour Hicks, Margot Grahame, Edmund Breon	Comedy	
Love Lies	Lupino Lane	Stanley Lupino, Dorothy Boyd, Binnie Barnes	Comedy	
The Love Race	Lupino Lane	Stanley Lupino, Jack Hobbs, Dorothy Boyd	Comedy	
The Loves of Ariane	Paul Czinner	Elisabeth Bergner, Percy Marmont, Warwick Ward	Drama	
The Lyons Mail	Arthur Maude	John Martin Harvey, Norah Baring Ben Webster	Mystery	

== M-Z ==
Title	Director	Cast	Genre	Notes
Madame Guillotine	Reginald Fogwell	Madeleine Carroll, Brian Aherne, Henry Hewitt	Historical romance	
The Man at Six	Harry Hughes	Anne Grey, Lester Matthews, Gerald Rawlinson	Crime	
The Man They Couldn't Arrest	T. Hayes Hunter	Hugh Wakefield, Gordon Harker, Garry Marsh	Crime	
Many Waters	Milton Rosmer	Lillian Hall-Davis, Arthur Margetson, Elizabeth Allan	Romance	
Mary	Alfred Hitchcock	Alfred Abel, Olga Chekhova, Paul Graetz	Mystery	The German-language version of Hitchcock's Murder!
Michael and Mary	Victor Saville	Herbert Marshall, Edna Best, Elizabeth Allan	Drama	
Mischief	Jack Raymond	Ralph Lynn, Winifred Shotter, Jeanne Stuart	Comedy	
Never Trouble Trouble	Lupino Lane	Lupino Lane, Renee Clama, Jack Hobbs	Comedy	
A Night in Montmartre	Leslie S. Hiscott	Hugh Williams, Heather Angel, Austin Trevor	Mystery	
No Lady	Lupino Lane	Lupino Lane, Sari Maritza, Renee Clama	Comedy	
The Officers' Mess	Manning Haynes	Richard Cooper, Elsa Lanchester, Harold French	Comedy	
The Old Man	H. Manning Haynes	Maisie Gay, Anne Grey, Lester Matthews	Mystery	
Old Soldiers Never Die	Monty Banks	Leslie Fuller, Molly Lamont, Alf Goddard	Comedy	
Other People's Sins	Sinclair Hill	Horace Hodges, Anne Grey, Stewart Rome	Crime	
The Other Woman	G.B. Samuelson	Isobel Elsom, David Hawthorne, Eva Moore	Drama	
Out of the Blue	Gene Gerrard	Gene Gerrard, Jessie Matthews, Kay Hammond	Comedy	
The Outsider	Harry Lachman	Joan Barry, Norman McKinnel, Harold Huth	Drama	
P.C. Josser	Milton Rosmer	Ernie Lotinga, Robert Douglas, Garry Marsh	Comedy	
The Perfect Lady	Milton Rosmer	Moira Lynd, Henry Wilcoxon, Reginald Gardiner	Comedy	
Plunder	Tom Walls	Ralph Lynn, Winifred Shotter, Robertson Hare	Comedy	
Poor Old Bill	Monty Banks	Leslie Fuller, Iris Ashley, Syd Courtenay	Comedy	
Potiphar's Wife	Maurice Elvey	Nora Swinburne, Laurence Olivier, Norman McKinnel	Drama	
Rich and Strange	Alfred Hitchcock	Henry Kendall, Joan Barry, Percy Marmont	Comedy	
The Ringer	Walter Forde	Patrick Curwen, Esmond Knight, Carol Goodner	Crime	
Romany Love	Fred Paul	Esmond Knight, Roy Travers, Florence McHugh	Musical	
The Rosary	Guy Newall	Margot Grahame, Elizabeth Allan, Leslie Perrins	Drama	
Rynox	Michael Powell	Stewart Rome, John Longden, Dorothy Boyd	Crime	
A Safe Affair	Herbert Wynne	Franklin Dyall, Connie Emerald, Douglas Jefferies	Crime	
Sally in Our Alley	Maurice Elvey	Gracie Fields, Ian Hunter, Florence Desmond	Drama	
The Shadow Between	Norman Walker	Godfrey Tearle, Kathleen O'Regan, Ann Casson	Romance/drama	
Shadows	Alexander Esway	Jacqueline Logan, Bernard Nedell, Gordon Harker	Crime	
The Skin Game	Alfred Hitchcock	Edmund Gwenn, Helen Haye, Jill Esmond	Drama	
The Sleeping Cardinal	Leslie S. Hiscott	Arthur Wontner, Ian Fleming, Jane Welsh	Mystery drama	
The Speckled Band	Jack Raymond	Raymond Massey, Lyn Harding, Angela Baddeley	Mystery drama	
Splinters in the Navy	Walter Forde	Sydney Howard, Alf Goddard, Helena Pickard	Comedy	
The Sport of Kings	Victor Saville	Leslie Henson, Hugh Wakefield, Gordon Harker	Comedy	
Stranglehold	Henry Edwards	Isobel Elsom, Garry Marsh, Derrick De Marney	Drama	
Strictly Business	Jacqueline Logan	Betty Amann, Carl Harbord, Molly Lamont	Comedy	
The Stronger Sex	Gareth Gundrey	Colin Clive, Adrianne Allen, Gordon Harker	Drama	
Sunshine Susie	Victor Saville	Renate Müller, Jack Hulbert, Owen Nares	Comedy	
Tell England	Anthony Asquith	Fay Compton, Carl Harbord, Dennis Hoey	World War I drama	
Third Time Lucky	Walter Forde	Bobby Howes, Dorothy Boyd, Gordon Harker	Comedy	
Tilly of Bloomsbury	Jack Raymond	Sydney Howard, Phyllis Konstam, Edward Chapman	Comedy	
To Oblige a Lady	H. Manning Haynes	Maisie Gay, Warwick Ward, Lilian Oldland	Comedy	
Two Crowded Hours	Michael Powell	John Longden, Jane Welsh, Jerry Verno	Drama	
Uneasy Virtue	Norman Walker	Fay Compton, Edmund Breon, Margot Grahame	Comedy	
Up for the Cup	Jack Raymond	Sydney Howard, Joan Wyndham, Sam Livesey	Comedy	
What a Night!	Monty Banks	Leslie Fuller, Molly Lamont, Charles Paton	Comedy	
The Wickham Mystery	G.B. Samuelson	Eve Gray, John Longden, Lester Matthews	Mystery	
The Wife's Family	Monty Banks	Gene Gerrard, Muriel Angelus, Molly Lamont	Comedy	
The Woman Between	Miles Mander	Owen Nares, Adrianne Allen, David Hawthorne	Romance	
The Written Law	Reginald Fogwell	Madeleine Carroll, Percy Marmont, Henry Hewitt	Drama	

== Short films ==
Title	Director	Cast	Genre	Notes
Aroma of the South Seas	W. P. Kellino	Reginald Gardiner, Wyn Richmond, Wallace Lupino	Comedy	
Bill and Coo	John Orton	Billy Merson, Herman Darewski, Hal Gordon	Comedy	
Bull Rushes	W. P. Kellino	Reginald Gardiner, Dorrie Deane, Wallace Lupino	Comedy	
Harry Lauder Songs	George Pearson		Short	
Hot Heir	W. P. Kellino	Charles Austin, Bobbie Comber	Comedy	
How He Lied to Her Husband	Cecil Lewis	Edmund Gwenn, Vera Lennox	Short	
Immediate Possession	Arthur Varney-Serrao	Herbert Mundin, Dorothy Bartlam	Comedy	
M'Blimey	J. Elder Wills	Bernard Ansell, Kenneth Kove	Short	
Morita	Fred Paul	Daphne Lennard, Jean Romaine	Musical Short	
My Old China	W. P. Kellino	Reginald Gardiner, Clifford Heatherley, Constance Carpenter, Gibb McLaughlin	Comedy	
The Other Mrs. Phipps	Julius Hagen	Sydney Fairbrother, Richard Cooper, Jane Welsh	Comedy short	
Rodney Steps In	Guy Newall	Richard Cooper, Elizabeth Allan	Comedy	
Stepping Stones	Geoffrey Benstead	Jade Hales, George Bellamy	Musical	
Who Killed Doc Robin?	W. P. Kellino	Clifford Heatherley, Dorrie Deane	Comedy	
The Wrong Mr. Perkins	Arthur Varney	Herbert Mundin, Sonia Bellamy	Comedy	

== See also ==
- 1931 in British music
- 1931 in British television
- 1931 in film
- 1931 in the United Kingdom
