= 1931 in British music =

This is a summary of 1931 in music in the United Kingdom.

== Events ==
- 24 January – Mary Garden makes her last appearance with the Chicago Civic Opera company. She retires to her native Scotland.
- 22–28 July – The ninth annual ISCM Festival of Contemporary Music takes place in London and Oxford, with concerts of orchestral, choral, and chamber music.
- 22 August – Anton Webern’s Passacaglia Op. 1 receives its first performance in England at the Proms, by the BBC Symphony Orchestra, conductor Henry Wood.
- date unknown – Gustav Holst appears as an extra in a crowd scene in the film The Bells.

== Popular music ==
- "Close Your Eyes", by D. Carter and H. M. Tennent
- "Lady Of Spain"; music by Tolchard Evans, lyrics by Erell Reaves
- "Mad Dogs and Englishmen", by Noël Coward
- "My Girl's Pussy", by Harry Roy and his Bat Club Boys

== Classical music: new works ==
- Havergal Brian – Symphony No. 2 in E minor
- Frank Bridge – Phantasm, for piano and orchestra
- Benjamin Britten –
  - Christ's Nativity, Christmas Suite, for SATB choir
  - Plymouth Town, ballet, for orchestra
  - String Quartet in D
- Arnold Cooke – Passacaglia, Scherzo, and Finale, for flute, oboe, clarinet, bassoon, and string quartet
- Frederick Delius –
  - Fantastic Dance, for orchestra
  - Irmelin Prelude, for orchestra
- George Dyson – The Canterbury Pilgrims (Geoffrey Chaucer), for soprano, tenor, baritone, choir, and orchestra
- Edward Elgar – Soliloquy, for oboe and orchestra
- Gerald Finzi – To Joy, for voice and piano, op. 13
- Patrick Hadley – Symphonic Ballad: The Trees So High
- Gustav Holst – Twelve Welsh Folk Songs, for choir, H183
- Herbert Howells –
  - "A Maid Peerless", for SSAA choir and orchestra
  - Severn, for SATB choir
- Gordon Jacob – Passacaglia on a Well-Known Theme, for orchestra
- Elizabeth Maconchy –
  - A Hymn to Christ, A Hymn to God the Father, for double choir
  - The Leaden Echo and the Golden Echo, for choir and orchestra
- Cyril Scott –
  - Concerto, for cello and orchestra
  - Trio No. 1, for violin, viola, and cello
  - Trio No. 2, for violin, viola, and cello
- Herbert Sumsion – Piano Trio
- Michael Tippett – Symphonic Movement, for orchestra
- Ralph Vaughan Williams –
  - Job: A Masque for Dancing (ballet)
  - Piano Concerto in C major
- William Walton – Belshazzar's Feast (oratorio)

== Opera ==
- Thomas Frederick Dunhill – Tantivy Towers, words by A. P. Herbert

== Film and Incidental music ==
- John D. H. Greenwood – Alibi

== Musical theatre ==
- 8 January – Folly To Be Wise (revue) opens at the Piccadilly Theatre, starring Cicely Courtneidge.
- 13 October – Noël Coward's Cavalcade opens at the Theatre Royal, Drury Lane, where it runs for 405 performances.
- 23 December – Hold My Hand (Music: Noel Gay Lyrics: Desmond Carter Book: Stanley Lupino) opens at the Gaiety Theatre, Starring Jessie Matthews, Sonnie Hale and Stanley Lupino.

== Musical films ==
- A Man of Mayfair, starring Jack Buchanan
- Sally in Our Alley, starring Gracie Fields
- Sunshine Susie, starring Renate Müller and Jack Hulbert

== Births ==
- 6 January – David Whitaker, composer, songwriter, arranger and conductor (died 2012)
- 29 January – Leslie Bricusse, composer, lyricist and playwright (died 2021)
- 5 March – Anthony Hedges, composer (died 2019)
- 25 March – Humphrey Burton, television music and arts presenter
- 30 June – James Loughran, orchestral conductor (died 2024)
- 29 April – Lonnie Donegan, skiffle musician (died 2002)
- 4 July – Duncan Lamont, saxophonist, composer and bandleader (died 1919)
- 5 July – Aloysius Gordon, British-based Jamaican jazz pianist, singer (died 2017)
- 28 August – John Shirley-Quirk, operatic bass-baritone (died 2014)
- 12 September – Tommy Moore, drummer (died 1981)
- 24 September – Anthony Newley, songwriter, actor and singer (died 1999)
- 4 October – Anna Reynolds, operatic mezzo-soprano (died 2014)
- 4 November – Clinton Ford, singer (died 2009)

== Deaths ==
- 8 May – Bertha Lewis, singer and actress with the D'Oyly Carte Opera Company, 43 (car accident)
- 18 June – Fanny Holland, singer and actress, 83
- 22 August – Joseph Tabrar, songwriter, 73
- 19 November – Frederic Cliffe, composer, 74
- 23 November – Leonora Braham, operatic soprano and actress, 78

== See also ==
- 1931 in British television
- 1931 in the United Kingdom
- List of British films of 1931
