= Wilfrid Hyde-White =

British actor (1903–1991)

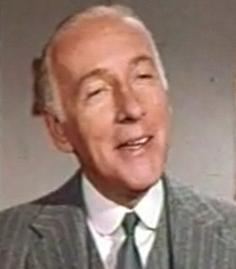
- Hyde-White in Ada (1961)
- Born: Wilfrid Hyde White; 12 May 1903; Bourton-on-the-Water, Gloucestershire, England
- Died: 6 May 1991 (aged 87); Woodland Hills, California, United States
- Resting place: Water Cemetery, Bourton-on-the-Water, Gloucestershire, England
- Occupations: Actor, singer
- Years active: 1934–1983
- Spouses: Blanche Glynne (m. 1927; died 1946) Ethel Drew (m. 1957)
- Children: 3; including Alex

Wilfrid Hyde-White (né Hyde White; 12 May 1903 – 6 May 1991) was an English actor. Described by Philip French as a "classic British film archetype", Hyde-White often portrayed droll and urbane upper-class characters. He had an extensive stage and screen career in both the United Kingdom and the United States, and portrayed over 160 film and television roles between 1935 and 1987. He was twice nominated for a Tony Award for Best Actor in a Play, in 1957 for The Reluctant Debutante and in 1973 for The Jockey Club Stakes.

== Early life ==
Wilfrid Hyde White was born in Bourton-on-the-Water in Gloucestershire, England in 1903 to the Rev. William Edward White, canon of Gloucester Cathedral, and his wife, Ethel Adelaide (née Drought). He was the nephew of actor J. Fisher White. He attended Marlborough College and the Royal Academy of Dramatic Art, of which he said, "I learned two things at RADA – I can't act and it doesn't matter."

== Career ==
Hyde-White made his stage debut in the farcical play Tons of Money on the Isle of Wight in 1922 and appeared in the West End for the first time three years later in the play Beggar on Horseback. He then gained steady work on the stage in a series of comedies produced at the Aldwych Theatre in London. He joined a tour of South Africa in 1932 before making his film debut in Josser on the Farm (1934) where he was credited as "Wilfrid Hyde White" (without the hyphen). He also appeared in some earlier films as plain "Hyde White". He later added the hyphen, as well as his first name.

Following a supporting role in The Third Man (1949), he became a fixture in British films of the 1950s. His other films of this period include Carry On Nurse (1959) and the Danny Kaye film On the Double (1961). Two-Way Stretch (1960) displays a more roguish side than some of the characters he played in this period. He continued to act on the stage and played opposite Laurence Olivier and Vivien Leigh in the repertory performance of Caesar and Cleopatra and Antony and Cleopatra in 1951. He also appeared on Broadway and was nominated for a Tony Award in 1956 for his role in The Reluctant Debutante. His first Hollywood appearance came alongside Marilyn Monroe in the film Let's Make Love (1960), followed by other films, including his best-known screen role as Col. Hugh Pickering in My Fair Lady (1964).

Between 1962 and 1965, Hyde-White starred in the BBC radio comedy The Men from the Ministry. In the 1970s and 1980s, he featured on the Battlestar Galactica pilot episode "Saga of a Star World" and The Associates. He was a series regular on the revamped second season of Buck Rogers in the 25th Century as Doctor Goodfellow. He continued to appear on Broadway, and earned a second Tony nomination for his performance in The Jockey Club Stakes.

He appeared in two episodes of the mystery series Columbo, starring Peter Falk as the rumpled detective. Although the first, "Dagger of the Mind" (1972), was set in Britain and concerned Columbo paying a visit to Scotland Yard, Hyde-White's UK tax problems meant that he was unable to take part in location filming in the UK. His scenes as a butler were therefore filmed in California. His second appearance on Columbo was in the episode "Last Salute to the Commodore" in 1976.

== Personal life ==
On 17 December 1927, Hyde-White married Blanche Hope Aitken, a Glamorgan-born British actress known professionally as Blanche Glynne (1893–1946). The couple had one son. Glynne died in 1946, aged 53. Hyde-White married actress Ethel Drew in 1957. He and Drew remained married until his death in 1991. The couple had two children, including actor Alex Hyde-White.

Hyde-White had a long reputation as a bon viveur, gambled heavily and spent money recklessly. In 1979, he was declared bankrupt by the Inland Revenue.

Hyde-White died from heart failure on 6 May 1991 at the age of 87, at the Motion Picture Country Home in Woodland Hills, Los Angeles, California, having lived in the United States for 25 years as a tax exile.

== Filmography ==
=== Complete films ===
- Josser on the Farm (1934) as Brooks
- Smith's Wives (1935) (uncredited)
- Night Mail (1935) (uncredited)
- Alibi Inn (1935) as Husband
- Admirals All (1935) as Mr. Stallybrass
- Murder by Rope (1936) as Alastair Dane
- Rembrandt (1936) as Civil Guardsman (uncredited)
- The Scarab Murder Case (1936) as Philo Vance
- Spring Handicap (1937) as Hawkins (uncredited)
- Elephant Boy (1937) as Commissioner
- Bulldog Drummond at Bay (1937) as Conrad (uncredited)
- Change for a Sovereign (1937) as Charles
- Murder in the Family (1938) as Purvitt – Estate Agent (uncredited)
- The Claydon Treasure Mystery (1938) as Holmes (uncredited)
- Meet Mr. Penny (1938) as Mr. Wilson
- I've Got a Horse (1938) as Police Constable
- Keep Smiling (1938) as Assistant Hotel Clerk (uncredited)
- The Outsider (1939) as Patient (uncredited)
- The Lion Has Wings (1939) as Waiter (uncredited)
- Over the Moon (1939) as Dwight – Sanitarium Spokesman (uncredited)
- The Lambeth Walk (1939) as Lord Battersby
- Poison Pen (1939) as Postman
- The Briggs Family (1940) as Man with Moustache at Party (uncredited)
- Turned Out Nice Again (1941) as Removal Man (uncredited)
- Lady from Lisbon (1942) as Ganier
- Asking for Trouble (1942) as Pettifer
- The Demi-Paradise (1943) as Nightclub Waiter (uncredited)
- Night Boat to Dublin (1946) as Taxi Driver
- Wanted for Murder (1946) as Guide in Madame Tussaud's
- Appointment with Crime (1946) as Cleaner
- While the Sun Shines (1947) as Male Receptionist
- Meet Me at Dawn (1947) as Garin – News Editor
- The Ghosts of Berkeley Square (1947) as Staff Captain
- My Brother Jonathan (1948) as Mr. Gaige
- The Winslow Boy (1948) as Wilkinson (uncredited)
- Bond Street (1948) as Jeweller
- My Brother's Keeper (1948) as Harding
- Quartet (1948) as 2nd Clubman (segment "The Colonel's Lady")
- The Passionate Friends (1949) as Lawyer
- The Forbidden Street (1949) as Mr. Culver
- That Dangerous Age (1949) as Mr. Potts
- The Bad Lord Byron (1949) as Mr. Hopton
- Adam and Evelyne (1949) as Col. Bradley
- Helter Skelter (1949) as Dr. B. Jekyll / Mr. Hyde
- Conspirator (1949) as Lord Pennistone
- The Third Man (1949) as Crabbin
- The Man on the Eiffel Tower (1949) as Professor Grollet
- Golden Salamander (1950) as Agno
- The Angel with the Trumpet (1950) as Simmerl
- Last Holiday (1950) as Chalfont
- Trio (1950) as Mr. Gray (segment "Mr. Know-All")
- The Mudlark (1950) as Tucker (uncredited)
- Highly Dangerous (1950) as Mr. Luke – British consul
- Midnight Episode (1950) as Mr. Knight
- Blackmailed (1951) as Lord Dearsley
- Mr Drake's Duck (1951) as Mr. May
- The Browning Version (1951) as Dr. Frobisher
- No Highway in the Sky (1951) as Fisher, Inspector of Accidents (uncredited)
- Outcast of the Islands (1951) as Vinck
- Mr. Denning Drives North (1952) as Woods
- The Card (1952) as Lord at Liverpool Boat Harbour (uncredited)
- Top Secret (1952) as Sir Hubert Wells
- The Story of Gilbert and Sullivan (1953) as Mr. Marston
- Four Sided Triangle (1953) as Government Minister (segment "Priceless Pocket")
- The Million Pound Note (1954) as Roderick Montpelier
- The Rainbow Jacket (1954) as Lord Stoneleigh
- Duel in the Jungle (1954) as Pitt
- Betrayed (1954) as Gen. Charles Larraby
- To Dorothy a Son (1954) as Mr. Starke
- See How They Run (1955) as Brig. Buskin
- John and Julie (1955) as Sir James
- The Adventures of Quentin Durward (1955) as Master Oliver
- The March Hare (1956) as Col. Keene
- My Teenage Daughter (1956) as Sir Joseph
- The Silken Affair (1956) as Sir Horace Hogg
- Tarzan and the Lost Safari (1957) as 'Doodles' Fletcher
- That Woman Opposite (1957) as Sir Maurice Lawes
- The Vicious Circle (1957) as Maj. Harrington, aka Robert Brady
- The Truth About Women (1957) as Sir George Tavistock
- Up the Creek (1958) as Adm. Foley
- Wonderful Things! (1958) as Sir Bertram
- The Lady Is a Square (1959) as Charles
- Carry On Nurse (1959) as The Colonel
- Life in Emergency Ward 10 (1959) as Professor Bourne-Evans
- North West Frontier (1959) as Bridie
- Libel (1959) as Hubert Foxley
- Two-Way Stretch (1960) as Soapy Stevens
- Let's Make Love (1960) as George Welch
- His and Hers (1961) as Charles Dunton
- On the Double (1961) as Colonel Somerset
- Ada (1961) as Sylvester Marin
- On the Fiddle (1961) as Trowbridge
- Crooks Anonymous (1962) as Laurence Montague
- In Search of the Castaways (1962) as Lord Glenarvan
- Aliki My Love (1963) as Richard Caraway
- My Fair Lady (1964) as Colonel Hugh Pickering
- John Goldfarb, Please Come Home! (1965) as Mustafa Guz
- You Must Be Joking! (1965) as Gen. Lockwood
- Ten Little Indians (1965) as Judge Cannon
- The Liquidator (1965) as Chief
- Our Man in Marrakesh (1966) as Arthur Fairbrother
- The Sandwich Man (1966) as Lord Uffingham
- Chamber of Horrors (1966) as Harold Blount
- The Million Eyes of Sumuru (1967) as Colonel Baisbrook
- P.J. (1968) as Billings-Browne
- The Magic Christian (1969) as Captain Reginald K. Klaus
- Gaily, Gaily (1969) as The Governor
- Skullduggery (1970) as Eaton
- Fragment of Fear (1970) as Mr. Copsey
- The Cherry Picker (1974) as Dobson
- No Longer Alone (1976) as Lord Home
- The Cat and the Canary (1979) as Cyrus West
- King Solomon's Treasure (1979) as Oldest Club Member
- A Touch of the Sun (1979) as M-1
- Xanadu (1980) as Male Heavenly Voice (voice)
- In God We Tru$t (1980) as Abbot Thelonious
- Oh, God! Book II (1980) as Judge Thomas Miller
- Tarzan, the Ape Man (1981) as Club Member (voice)
- The Toy (1982) as Barkley
- Fanny Hill (1983) as Mr. John Barville

=== Partial television credits ===
- Laburnum Grove (BBC, 1947) as Bernard Baxley
- A Month in the Country (BBC, 1947) as Bolshintsov
- Affairs of State (BBC, 1952)
- The Reluctant Debutante (BBC, 1955) as Jimmy Broadbent
- The Twilight Zone: "Passage on the Lady Anne" (1963) as Tobias "Toby" McKenzie
- Lucy in London (1966) as Madame Tussauds Guide
- Mission: Impossible: "Echo of Yesterday" (1967)
- Daniel Boone: "Who Will They Hang From The Yardarm If Willy Gets Away" (1968)
- The Sunshine Patriot (TV movie, 1968) as Morris Vanders
- Fear No Evil (TV movie, 1969) as Harry Snowden
- Run a Crooked Mile (TV movie, 1969) as Dr. Ralph Sawyer
- It Takes a Thief: "To Lure a Man" (1969)
- Ritual of Evil (TV movie, 1970) as Harry Snowden
- Columbo: "Dagger of the Mind" (1972)
- A Brand New Life (TV movie, 1973) as Mr. Berger
- Columbo: "Last Salute to the Commodore" (1976)
- The Great Houdini (TV Movie, 1976) as Supt. Melville
- Battlestar Galactica (TV, 1978) as Sire Anton
- Battlestar Galactica (1978)
- The Associates (1979)
- The Rebels (TV movie, 1979) as Gen. Howe
- Vegas (TV episode, 1979) as Prof. Tolan
- Laverne and Shirley (TV episode, 1980) as Colonel Kalaback
- Scout's Honor (TV movie, 1980) as Uncle Toby "Nuncle" Bartlett
- Dick Turpin (1981) as Governor Sir Basil Appleyard
- Buck Rogers in the 25th Century (1981) as Dr. Goodfellow
- Father Damien: The Leper Priest (TV movie, 1980) as Bishop Maigret
- The Letter (TV movie, 1982) as Judge

== Theatre ==
Hyde-White appeared in numerous plays, such as The Jockey Club Stakes, at first in London's West End in 1970, starring alongside Viviane Ventura, then on Broadway in 1973; he was nominated for a Tony award for "Best Actor in a Play" for the Broadway run.
