= String Quartet in D major =

String Quartet in D major may refer to:

- No. 4 of the String Quartets, Op. 20 (Haydn)
- No. 6 of the String Quartets, Op. 33 (Haydn)
- No. 6 of the String Quartets, Op. 50 (Haydn)
- No. 5 of the String Quartets, Op. 64 (Haydn)
- No. 5 of the String Quartets, Op. 76 (Haydn)
- String Quartet No. 2 (Mozart)
- String Quartet No. 20 (Mozart)
- String Quartet No. 21 (Mozart)
- String Quartet No. 3 (Beethoven)
- String Quartet No. 6 (Schubert)
- String Quartet No. 7 (Schubert)
- String Quartet No. 3 (Mendelssohn)
- String Quartet (Franck)
- String Quartet No. 2 (Borodin)
- String Quartet No. 1 (Tchaikovsky)
- String Quartet No. 3 (Dvořák)
- String Quartet No. 4 (Piston)
- String Quartet No. 4 (Shostakovich)
- String Quartet in D major (Britten) (1931)
- String Quartet No. 1 (Britten)
