= 1931 in British television =

This is a list of British television related events in 1931.

== Events ==
- 3 June – First television outside broadcast of a sporting event: Baird televises the Epsom Derby horse race.

== Births ==
- 10 January – Peter Barnes, playwright and screenwriter (died 2004)
- 2 February – Les Dawson, comedian (died 1993)
- 15 February – Claire Bloom, actress
- 18 February – Ned Sherrin, producer (died 2007)
- 28 February – Peter Alliss, professional golfer, television commentator and golf course designer (died 2020)
- 25 March – Humphrey Burton, music and arts presenter (died 2025)
- 7 April – Lynne Perrie, actress (died 2006)
- 8 April – Beryl Vertue, producer and media executive (died 2022)
- 14 April – Kenneth Cope, actor (died 2024)
- 7 June
  - Michael Bakewell, producer (died 2023)
  - Virginia McKenna, actress
- 22 June – Colin Crompton, stand-up comedian (died 1985)
- 2 July – Frank Williams, comic actor (died 2022)
- 25 August – Bryan Mosley, actor (died 1999)
- 8 September – Jack Rosenthal, screenwriter and playwright (died 2004)
- 22 September – Fay Weldon, screenwriter, playwright and novelist (died 2023)
- 23 October – Diana Dors, actress (died 1984)

== See also ==
- 1931 in British music
- 1931 in the United Kingdom
- List of British films of 1931
