= 1931 in the United Kingdom =

Events from the year 1931 in the United Kingdom.

== Incumbents ==
- Monarch – George V
- Prime Minister – Ramsay MacDonald (Labour until 24 August, Coalition starting 24 August)

== Events ==
- 6 January – Sadler's Wells Theatre opens in London.
- 9 January – Ulster Canal abandoned.
- 26 January – Winston Churchill resigns from Stanley Baldwin's shadow cabinet after disagreeing with the policy of conciliation with Indian nationalism.
- 29 January – for the fourth time in nine years, there is a fatal underground explosion at Haig Pit, Whitehaven, in the Cumberland Coalfield, killing 27 people.
- 4 February – RAF Blackburn Iris III seaplane S 238 crashes in Plymouth Sound after a senior officer takes control from the pilot and fails to make a safe landing, resulting in multiple fatalities. One of the first to the rescue is T. E. Lawrence, stationed locally at this time.
- 1 March – Oswald Mosley forms the New Party, having resigned from the Labour Party a day earlier.
- 19 March – Westminster St George's by-election results in the victory of the Conservative candidate Duff Cooper. The by-election has been treated virtually as a referendum on the leadership of the Conservative leader Stanley Baldwin, and Duff Cooper's victory ends the campaign by the press barons Lord Beaverbrook and Viscount Rothermere to oust Baldwin.
- 14 April – the Highway Code first issued.
- 26 April – census in England, Wales and Scotland.
- 1 May – National Trust for Scotland established and acquires its first property, Crookston Castle.
- 5 May – the Vic-Wells Ballet, later to become The Royal Ballet, debuts in London.
- 15 May – shoppers in London escape with their lives when a chemical factory in Bayswater explodes.
- 23 May – Whipsnade Zoo is opened in Bedfordshire by the Zoological Society of London.
- June – publication of Report of the Committee on Finance and Industry (the 'Macmillan Committee') on the relationship between the banking and financial system and British trade and industry, largely written by John Maynard Keynes.
- 7 June – the Dogger Bank earthquake is felt across Britain.
- 9 June – submarine HMS Poseidon sinks after collision with a Chinese freighter off Weihai, China. Twenty lives are lost but a few submariners become the first to surface using the Davis Submerged Escape Apparatus.
- 12 June
  - The Christian Marxist Hewlett Johnson is installed as Dean of Canterbury, being transferred from Manchester.
  - Cricketer Charlie Parker equals J. T. Hearne's record for the earliest date to reach 100 wickets.
- July – new Royal Corinthian Yacht Club clubhouse at Burnham-on-Crouch in Essex, a pioneering British example of International Style designed by Joseph Emberton, is opened.
- 31 July – the May Report of the Committee on National Expenditure recommends extensive cuts in government spending. This produces a political crisis as many members of the Labour Party government object to the proposals.
- 11 August – a run on the pound leads to a political and economic crisis in Britain, part of the European banking crisis of 1931.
- 24 August – Labour Government of Ramsay MacDonald resigns and is replaced by a National Government of people drawn from all parties also under MacDonald, as suggested by King George V earlier in the year.
- 5 September – John Thomson, goalkeeper of Celtic, dies in hospital after fracturing his skull in a collision with Rangers forward Sam English in the 'Old Firm' League derby at Ibrox Park.
- 6 September – Chancellor of the Exchequer Philip Snowden announces salary cuts for all government employees and reductions to unemployment benefit.
- 7 September – second Round Table Conference on the constitutional future of India opens in London. Mahatma Gandhi represents the Indian National Congress and on the weekend of 26 September visits the Lancashire cotton town of Darwen.
- 13 September – Schneider Trophy seaplane race flown at Calshot Spit. For the third successive time the British team (sponsored by Lady Houston) wins with Flt. Lt. John Boothman flying the course in Supermarine S.6B serial S1595 designed by R. J. Mitchell with Rolls-Royce R engines at a world record speed of 340.09 mph (547.31 km/h). On 29 September Flt Lt. George Stainforth in S.6B serial S1596 breaks the 400 mph air speed record barrier at 407.5 mph (655.67 km/h).
- 15 September – Invergordon Mutiny: Strikes in the Royal Navy as a result of pay cuts.
- 20 September – pound sterling comes off the gold standard.
- Autumn – means test introduced for those in receipt of unemployment insurance for more than six months.
- 15 October – MI5 ceases to be a section of the War Office, being officially renamed the Security Service, and takes over the counter-subversion section (SSI) from Scotland Yard's Special Branch.
- 17 October – Leeds Bradford International Airport is opened as Leeds and Bradford Municipal Aerodrome.
- 27 October – general election results in victory for the National Government in the country's greatest ever electoral landslide. Ramsay MacDonald remains Prime Minister. This election is held on a Tuesday: all subsequent ones will be held on Thursdays.
- 12 November – Abbey Road Studios in London are opened by Sir Edward Elgar.
- 20 November – an underground firedamp explosion at Bentley Colliery in the South Yorkshire Coalfield kills 45.
- 21 November – the infamous Red-and-White Party, given by Arthur Jeffress in Maud Allan's Regent's Park town house in London, marks the end of the "Bright young things" subculture in Britain.
- 11 December – Parliament enacts the Statute of Westminster, which establishes a status of legislative equality between the self-governing dominions of the Commonwealth of Australia, Canada, the Irish Free State, Newfoundland, the Dominion of New Zealand and the Union of South Africa.
- 12 December – Great Depression: work on construction of "Hull Number 534", the future ocean liner RMS Queen Mary, at John Brown & Company's shipyard on Clydebank is suspended for more than two years.
- 27 December – the statue of Eros returns to London's Piccadilly Circus after a nine-year absence.

== Publications ==
- Arthur Bryant's biography King Charles the Second.
- Herbert Butterfield's study The Whig Interpretation of History.
- Agatha Christie's novel The Sittaford Mystery.
- A. J. Cronin's first novel Hatter's Castle.
- Frances Iles' novel Malice Aforethought.
- Anthony Powell's novel Afternoon Men.
- Vita Sackville-West's novel All Passion Spent.
- Dorothy L. Sayers' Lord Peter Wimsey novel The Five Red Herrings.
- Virginia Woolf's novel The Waves.
- Second edition of the hymnal Songs of Praise, including Eleanor Farjeon's Morning Has Broken.

== Births ==
- 1 January – Mona Hammond, Jamaican-born British actress (died 2022)
- 2 January – Robin Marlar, cricket player and journalist (died 2022)
- 6 January – P. J. Kavanagh, writer and broadcaster (died 2015)
- 10 January – Peter Barnes, playwright and screenwriter (died 2004)
- 13 January
  - Ian Hendry, English actor (died 1984)
  - Chris Wiggins, English-born Canadian actor (died 2017 in Canada)
- 19 January – Patsy Rowlands, actress (died 2005)
- 20 January – Harry Ewing, Baron Ewing of Kirkford, politician (died 2007)
- 22 January – Claire Rayner, journalist and broadcaster (died 2010)
- 26 January
  - Patricia Greene, actress (died 2026)
  - Alfred Lynch, actor (died 2003)
- 27 January
  - John Hopkins, screenwriter (died 1998)
  - Nigel Vinson, Baron Vinson, businessman
- 29 January – Leslie Bricusse, English-born film and stage composer and lyricist (died 2021)
- 2 February – Les Dawson, comedian (died 1993)
- 6 February – Fred Trueman, cricketer (died 2006)
- 14 February – Jonathan Adams, actor (died 2005)
- 15 February – Claire Bloom, actress
- 17 February – Fay Godwin, photographer (died 2005)
- 18 February – Ned Sherrin, broadcaster and entertainer (died 2007)
- 23 February – Robin Wood, film critic (died 2009)
- 24 February – Brian Close, cricketer (died 2015)
- 26 February – Ally MacLeod, football manager (died 2004)
- 28 February – Peter Alliss, golfer and commentator (died 2020)
- 3 March – Mike Chaney, editor, broadcasting executive and journalist (died 2024)
- 6 March – Jimmy Stewart, racing driver (died 2008)
- 11 March – Allan Ganley, jazz musician (died 2008)
- 13 March – Michael Podro, art historian (died 2008)
- 14 March – Frank Sando, long-distance runner (died 2012)
- 19 March – Alan Newton, track cyclist (died 2023)
- 22 March – Leslie Thomas, Welsh novelist (died 2014)
- 25 March
  - Humphrey Burton, television music and arts presenter (died 2025)
  - Erik Smith, record producer (born in Germany; died 2004)
- 29 March
  - Anthony Benjamin, painter, sculptor and printmaker (died 2002)
  - Norman Tebbit, politician (died 2025)
- 6 April – Brian Jackson, actor (died 2022)
- 7 April – Geoff Elliott, decathlete and pole vaulter (died 2014)
- 8 April – Beryl Vertue, television producer (died 2022)
- 9 April – Ken Wilmshurst, triple jumper (died 1992)
- 11 April – Lewis Jones, rugby player (died 2024)
- 14 April – Vic Wilson, racing driver (died 2001)
- 20 April
  - Michael Allenby, 3rd Viscount Allenby, English lieutenant and politician (died 2014)
  - John Eccles, 2nd Viscount Eccles, English businessman and politician
- 25 April – David Shepherd, artist and conservationist (died 2017)
- 29 April – Lonnie Donegan, musician (died 2002)
- 4 May – Thomas Stuttaford, British doctor, politician (died 2018)
- 10 May – Michael Mustill, Baron Mustill, English lawyer and judge (died 2015)
- 11 May – Angus McBride, illustrator (died 2007)
- 16 May – Peter Levi, poet, Jesuit priest and scholar (died 2000)
- 18 May – Bruce Halford, racing driver (died 2001)
- 21 May – Desmond Wilcox, journalist and television producer (died 2000)
- 25 May – John Littlewood, chess player (died 2009)
- 7 June
  - Virginia McKenna, actress
  - Malcolm Morley, painter (died 2018)
- 11 June – Ray Wood, footballer (died 2002)
- 14 June – Kenneth Cope, actor (died 2024)
- 20 June – Richard Southwood, biologist (died 2005)
- 24 June
  - George Petchey, footballer (died 2019)
  - John Shearman, art historian (died 2003)
- 26 June
  - Alan Bailey, senior civil servant (died 2023)
  - Colin Wilson, writer (died 2013)
- 29 June – Brian Hutton, Baron Hutton, Lord Chief Justice of Northern Ireland and British Lord of Appeal in Ordinary (died 2020)
- 30 June
  - Allan Jay, foil and épée fencer (died 2023)
  - James Loughran, conductor (died 2024)
- 2 July
  - Johnnie Mortimer, comedy scriptwriter (died 1992)
  - Frank Williams, actor (died 2022)
- 3 July
  - Angus Campbell-Gray, 22nd Lord Gray, Scottish peer (died 2003)
  - Mick Cullen, footballer
  - Dickie Dowsett, footballer (died 2020)
- 4 July – Peter Richardson, cricketer (died 2017)
- 6 July – Gordon Barker, cricketer and footballer (died 2006)
- 7 July – Alex South, footballer
- 9 July – Laurence O'Keeffe, diplomat (died 2003)
- 13 July
  - Jim Cairney, footballer (died 2018)
  - James Cellan Jones, television and film director (died 2019)
- 14 July – Robert Stephens, actor (died 1995)
- 15 July – Brian Sewell, art critic (died 2015)
- 16 July – Fergus Gordon Kerr, Scottish Roman Catholic priest of the English Dominican Province
- 17 July – Ted Cullinan, architect (died 2019)
- 20 July – Tony Marsh, racing driver (died 2009)
- 22 July – Charles Huxtable, Army officer (died 2018)
- 5 August – Billy Bingham, Northern Irish footballer and manager (died 2022)
- 8 August – Roger Penrose, mathematical physicist, recipient of the Nobel Prize in Physics
- 10 August – L. J. K. Setright, motoring journalist (died 2005)
- 21 August – Barry Foster, actor (died 2002)
- 23 August – Richard Vincent, Baron Vincent of Coleshill, British military officer, life peer (died 2018)
- 26 August – Geoffrey Dickens, Conservative politician (died 1995)
- 28 August – John Shirley-Quirk, bass-baritone (died 2014)
- 29 August – Evelyn de Rothschild, English banker and businessman (died 2022)
- 30 August – Ifor James, horn player (died 2004)
- 31 August – Bernard Bennett, snooker player (died 2002)
- 1 September – Cecil Parkinson, Conservative politician (died 2016)
- 8 September
  - Susan Bradshaw, pianist (died 2005)
  - Jack Rosenthal, playwright (died 2004)
- 12 September – Ian Holm, actor (died 2020)
- 13 September - Brian Dobson, archaeologist (died 2012)
- 22 September
  - Fay Weldon, playwright and author (died 2023)
  - George Younger, 4th Viscount Younger of Leckie, Scottish politician (died 2003)
- 24 September – Elizabeth Blackadder, painter (died 2021)
- 25 September – Peter Woodthorpe, actor (died 2004)
- 27 September – Malcolm Caldwell, academic and writer (died 1978)
- 4 October – Terence Conran, designer and businessman (died 2020)
- 8 October – Bill Brown, football goalkeeper (died 2004)
- 9 October – Tony Booth, actor (died 2017)
- 19 October – John le Carré, novelist (died 2020)
- 22 October – Jim Parks, cricketer (died 2022)
- 23 October – Diana Dors, actress (died 1984)
- 25 October – Jimmy McIlroy, footballer (died 2018)
- 27 October – David Bryant, bowls player (died 2020)
- 30 October – David M. Wilson, art historian and museum curator
- 4 November – Clinton Ford, singer (died 2009)
- 5 November – Diane Pearson, book editor and novelist (died 2017)
- 10 November – Don Henderson, actor (died 1997)
- 11 November – Roy Sandstrom, track and field sprinter (died 2019)
- 13 November – Jean Rook, journalist (died 1991)
- 14 November – Jennifer Jayne, actress (died 2006)
- 21 November – Stanley Kalms, Baron Kalms, businessman and life peer (died 2025)
- 27 November – Geoffrey Jones, film director (died 2005)
- 28 November – John Anderson (died 2024)
- 29 November – Geoffrey Moorhouse, journalist and writer (died 2009)
- 7 December – Maurice Agis, sculptor (died 2009)
- 18 December – Alison Plowden, historian (born in India; died 2007)
- 21 December – Margaret M. McGowan, historian (died 2022)
- 27 December – John Charles, footballer (died 2004)
- 30 December – John Houghton, climate scientist (died 2020)

== Deaths ==
- 4 January – Louise, Princess Royal (born 1867)
- 22 January – Alfred Maudslay, colonial diplomat, explorer and archaeologist (born 1850)
- 11 February – Sir Charles Parsons, inventor (born 1854)
- 5 March – Arthur Tooth, Anglican clergyman prosecuted for Ritualist practices in the 1870s (born 1839)
- 17 March – James Stewart, Scottish politician (born 1863)
- 27 March
  - Arnold Bennett, novelist (born 1867)
  - Margaret McMillan, pioneer of nursery education (born 1860 in the United States)
- 6 April – William Lionel Wyllie, marine painter (born 1851)
- 16 April – St. George Littledale, traveller and big game hunter (born 1851)
- 30 April – Sammy Woods, cricketer (born 1867)
- 26 May – Kate Marsden, medical missionary (born 1859)
- 27 May – Agnata Butler, classical scholar (born 1867)
- 13 June – Jesse Boot, 1st Baron Trent, businessman (born 1850)
- 18 August John Sherwood-Kelly, soldier, recipient of the Victoria Cross (born 1880 in South Africa)
- 22 August – Joseph Tabrar, songwriter (born 1857)
- 5 September – John Thomson, footballer (born 1909)
- 2 October – Sir Thomas Lipton, retailer and yachtsman (born 1850)
- 14 November – Sir William Peyton, army general (born 1866)
- 20 November – Julius Drewe, businessman, retailer and entrepreneur (born 1856)
- 31 December – Lancelot Speed, illustrator and silent film director (born 1860)

== See also ==
- List of British films of 1931
