= Another Part of the Forest (film) =

1948 film by Michael Gordon

- Publicity still with, from left to right, Dona Drake, Dan Duryea, Ann Blyth, Fredric March, Florence Eldridge, Edmond O'Brien, and John Dall
- Directed by: Michael Gordon
- Screenplay by: Vladimir Pozner
- Based on: Another Part of the Forest; 1946 play by Lillian Hellman
- Produced by: Jerry Bresler
- Starring: Fredric March; Florence Eldridge; Dan Duryea; Edmond O'Brien
- Cinematography: Hal Mohr
- Edited by: Milton Carruth
- Music by: Daniele Amfitheatrof
- Production company: Universal-International
- Distributed by: Universal-International
- Release date: May 18, 1948
- Running time: 107 minutes
- Country: United States
- Language: English
- Budget: $1.3 million
- Box office: $800,000 (est) (domestic)

Another Part of the Forest is a 1948 American drama film starring Fredric March. Directed by Michael Gordon, its screenplay was adapted by Vladimir Pozner from the 1946 Lillian Hellman play of the same name, a prequel to her 1939 drama The Little Foxes

== Plot ==
The Hubbard family of Bowden, Alabama, is led by its ruthless patriarach, the evil, wealthy, duplicitous Marcus. Fifteen years have passed since he made his fortune as a profiteer during the Civil War. His long-suffering wife Lavinia is riddled by Marcus' cold cruelty with physical and mental ailments, patiently waiting for the opportunity to help others and atone for the family crimes through a hospital he promises to build but never will.

Marcus raised himself from poverty in the Piney Woods, toiling at menial labor while teaching himself Greek, Latin, and the Classics. Sharpening his business skills to a deadly point he exploited his poverty-wrought neighbors, making a fortune in salt they desperately needed and collaborating with the North in the slaughter of their sons in an ambush.

He is equaled in ruthlessness only by his cold, calculating, hard-hearted eldest son Benjamin, short-leashed by his father and driven to topple him. Younger son Oscar is a spineless weasel, desperately pursuing cheap, covetous, can-can dancer Laurette Sincee, who merely plays him for what she can get, and resorting to the Klan to vanquish a romantic rival. Regina is the Hubbards' scheming viper of a daughter, who will use anyone for anything and leaves scandal in her wake Benjamin seeks to blackmail her with. Still, she remains always one treacherous twist ahead of him.

Convinced she can manipulate her father into bankrolling a more glamorous life in Chicago, she seeks to escape her outcast family with the socially superior former Confederate officer John Bagtry on her arm. John cares less that the Bagtry family plantation totters near bankruptcy; he is set on a command in Brazil that will restore his life's purpose. Blindly trusting Benjamin, his sister Birdie arranges to pledge everything the Bagtrys own against a loan that will assuredly end in forfeiture – with Benjamin skimming 40% off the top to speculate in stocks in a bid to strengthen his hand against his father.

Everything unravels all at once: John spurns Regina, Marcus discovers Benjamin's duplicity and cancels the loan, and Laurette leaves for New Orleans without her lickspittle Oscar, who crawls about searching for the $1,000 his father had promised him to leave in an envelope on a table.

When Benjamin finally twists his mother's desperate pleas for her hospital into revealing that his father was a collaborator with the Yankees and conspired with them in the massacre of the townsfolks' sons he has all he needs not merely to wrest everything from Marcus but leave the man broken and humiliated. Shifting with the sea change, Oscar and Regina swing round to Benjamin, who offers only strings that will turn them into his marionettes. They jump at the chance. Seeing this, Lavinia declares she despises all her children, and intends to find her personal sanctuary from the family hell alone in the Piney Woods.

== Cast ==
- Fredric March as Marcus Hubbard
- Florence Eldridge as Lavinia Hubbard
- Dan Duryea as Oscar Hubbard
- Edmond O'Brien as Benjamin "Ben" Hubbard
- Ann Blyth as Regina Hubbard
- John Dall as John Bagtry
- Betsy Blair as Birdie Bagtry
- Dona Drake as Laurette Sincee
- Fritz Leiber as Colonel Isham
- Whit Bissell as Jugger
- Don Beddoe as Penniman
- Wilton Graff as Sam Taylor
- Virginia Farmer as Clara Bagtry
- Libby Taylor as Coralee
- Smoki Whitfield as Jake
- Rex Lease as Josh (uncredited)

== Critical reception ==
Thomas M. Pryor of The New York Times called the film "a compelling entertainment" and added "Vladimir Pozner has preserved the spirit of the play in his screen treatment and Michael Gordon's direction gives a fluency to scenes which might easily have become static due to the profuseness of the dialogue."

Time stated "Under Michael Gordon's direction it is a nearly perfect example of how to film a play. There is hardly a shot which does not set up visual tension against the lashing, steel-spring dialogue; there is not a single performance which is short of adequate; the work of Miss Eldridge, Mr. O'Brien and Betsey Blair, as a shaky-minded neighbor, is much more."

TV Guide stated "This utterly depressing film is salvaged through intense performances that rivet the viewer, along with the literate, acerbic script."

Filmink said the movie "has its fans".

== Awards and nominations ==
Screenwriter Vladimir Pozner was nominated for two Writers Guild of America Awards, for Best Written American Drama and the Robert Meltzer Award for the Screenplay Dealing Most Ably with Problems of the American Scene.
