= Libby Taylor =

Black Hollywood actress

- Born: Elizabeth A. Taylor; April 20, 1902; Chicago, Illinois, USA
- Died: August 23, 1961 (aged 59); Los Angeles, California, USA

Libby Taylor (April 20, 1902 – August 23, 1961) was an African American character actress of the stage and screen who was active in Hollywood from the 1930s through the 1950s.

== Biography ==
In 1933, while working as a struggling actress in Harlem, she accepted Mae West's offer to become West's personal maid. West in turn helped Taylor get roles in Hollywood films. This arrangement lasted for several years. When Taylor had a stroke in 1955, she told reporters that contrary to the headlines, West had not been helping her financially.

== Selected filmography ==
- Bright Road (1953)
- Two Tickets to Broadway (1951)
- Al Jennings of Oklahoma (1951)
- You're My Everything (1949)
- Another Part of the Forest (1948)
- The Foxes of Harrow (1947)
- The Perfect Marriage (1946)
- Cinderella Jones (1946)
- My Gal Sal (1942)
- Flight from Destiny (1941)
- Blonde Inspiration (1941)
- Santa Fe Trail (1941)
- The Howards of Virginia (1940)
- The Great McGinty (1940)
- Babes in Arms (1939)
- Secrets of an Actress (1938)
- Smashing the Rackets (1938)
- Woman Against Woman (1938)
- The Buccaneer (1938)
- The Good Old Soak (1937)
- Three Smart Girls (1936)
- Libeled Lady (1936)
- Lucky Corrigan (1936)
- Stage Struck (1936)
- Diamond Jim (1935)
- Every Night at Eight (1935)
- Shanghai (1935)
- Black Sheep (1935)
- Star of Midnight (1935)
- Transient Lady (1935)
- Sweet Music (1935)
- Ruggles of Red Gap (1935)
- Society Doctor (1935)
- I'm No Angel (1933)
- Ann Carver's Profession (1933)
- The Cabin in the Cotton (1932)
