= Josser on the Farm =

1934 film by T. Hayes Hunter

- Trade ad in The Daily Film Renter (2 November 1934)
- Directed by: T. Hayes Hunter
- Screenplay by: Con West
- Starring: Ernie Lotinga; Betty Astell; Hope Davy
- Cinematography: Alex Bryce
- Production company: Fox-British Pictures
- Release date: 1 April 1934
- Running time: 63 minutes
- Country: United Kingdom
- Language: English

Josser on the Farm is a 1934 British comedy film directed by T. Hayes Hunter and starring Ernie Lotinga, Betty Astell and Garry Marsh. It was written by Con West, and was part of the series of Josser films featuring Lotinga. It marked of screen debut of Wilfrid Hyde-White.

== Preservation status ==
The British Film Institute National Archive holds a collection of stills but no film or video materials.

== Plot ==
Farmhand Jimmy Josser overhears a scheme cooked up by a crook named Granby to seize control of the farm where Josser works. Josser swindles money out of Granby and uses the cash to buy a partnership in the farm for himself. Then, he goes head-to-head with Granby in a local election and wins, becoming both a councillor and a magistrate. In his new judicial role, he presides over the local court and dismisses charges against the patrons of a nightclub owned by his girlfriend, Betty. They had been rounded up after Granby secretly spiked the temperance cocktail with alcohol, causing chaos in the club.

== Cast ==
- Ernie Lotinga as Jimmy Josser
- Betty Astell as Betty
- Garry Marsh as Granby
- Muriel Aked as Mrs Savage
- Wilfrid Hyde-White as Brooks
- John Gattrell as Dennis
- Hope Davy as June
- Edwin Ellis as Spud
- H. F. Maltby as Luke

== Reception ==
Kine Weekly wrote: "Broad comedy extravaganza, the story of which is so planned as to provide ample scope for the star's robust character-drawing. The humour is not designed for the better-class audience, but it has a hearty music-hall tang which should spell laughter with the masses. There is useful team work to back up Lotinga's fooling, and the presentation is compact. Attractive comedy bet for industrial audiences on the star's wide following."

The Daily Film Renter wrote: "Production values are crude, the picture relying solely on the personality of the star, Slapstick and hoary old chestnuts are the humorous mainsprings, Lotinga being allowed a free hand."

Picturegoer wrote: "Ernie Lotinga puts over his music-hall character and provides a one-man show with somewhat crude, if robust, humour of the slapstick order. Adequately produced, it will appeal to admirers of the popular stage comedian more particularly."
