= Dangerous Ground (1934 film) =

1934 British film by Norman Walker

- DVD cover
- Directed by: Norman Walker
- Written by: Dion Titheradge; Dorothy Rowan
- Starring: Malcolm Keen; Jack Raine; Joyce Kennedy; Martin Lewis
- Cinematography: Cyril Bristow
- Edited by: David Lean
- Music by: Rex Burrows
- Production company: Paramount-British
- Distributed by: Paramount
- Release date: May 1934
- Running time: 68 minutes
- Country: United Kingdom
- Language: English

Dangerous Ground is a 1934 British mystery film directed by Norman Walker and starring Malcolm Keen, Jack Raine and Joyce Kennedy. It was written by Dion Titheradge and Dorothy Rowan. The film was a quota quickie, produced by Paramount's British subsidiary at British and Dominions Elstree Studios in Hertfordshire. The film's editor was David Lean.

== Synopsis ==
Two insurance detectives work with the police to identify and bring down a crime kingpin. After one is murdered, his partner and his daughter decide to solve the case themselves.

== Cast ==
- Malcolm Keen as Mark Lyndon
- Jack Raine as Philip Tarry
- Joyce Kennedy as Claire Breedon
- Martin Lewis as John Breedon
- Kathleen Kelly as Joan Breedon
- Gordon Begg as Holford
- Henry B. Longhurst as Inspector Hurley

== Reception ==
Kine Weekly wrote: "This crime drama has quite a sound plot, but its salient points are blunted by the unimaginative direction. The treatment is so casual, in the majority of cases, so deliberate, that suspense and thrills seldom accompany the development. Lack of essential slickness turns what might have been good situations into ordinary and obvious ones. Malcolm Keen has a forceful presence and a fine speaking voice, but fails to conceal completely the villainy of Lyndon. ... The story displays sound invention, and the unmasking of the murderer is a particularly neat piece of work, but full effect is lost through the producer's inability to time the situations accurately."

The Daily Film Renter wrote: "The leisurely direction, although providing a fair quota of suspense values, does not seem to have made the most of the material available, and there are one or two rather slow patches."

Picturegoer wrote: "A murder mystery, indifferently handled, and so slowly and unimaginatively treated that there is little thrill or suspense value. Malcolm Keen makes rather too obvious a villain, but the rest of the cast is quite good."

Picture Show wrote: "The story is by no means unique, but the witty dialogue is responsible for the measure of success attained. Jack Raine as the detective is rather unconvincing but extremely immaculate. Malcolm Keen as Lyndon gives a good performance. Gordon Begg as the butler does well."
