= Josser on the River =

1932 film

- Directed by: Norman Lee
- Written by: Leslie Arliss; Norman Lee
- Produced by: Norman Lee
- Starring: Ernie Lotinga; Molly Lamont; Charles Hickman
- Production company: British International Pictures
- Distributed by: Wardour Films
- Release date: 19 August 1932
- Running time: 75 minutes
- Country: United Kingdom
- Language: English

Josser on the River is a 1932 British comedy film directed by Norman Lee and starring Ernie Lotinga, Molly Lamont and Charles Hickman. It was written by Leslie Arliss and Lee.

== Preservation status ==
The British Film Institute National Archive holds a script but no film or video materials.

== Plot ==
Jimmy Josser and his partner Hank are seaside photographers who come into possession of some compromising photographs of a young married couple, Eddie and Julia, taken while they were holidaying separately. Jimmy and Hank turn up at the newleyweds' houseboat with the intention of blackmailing them. Eddie, unable to find the money to meet their demands, convinces Jimmy and Hank to pose as servants, when his wealthy but puritanical uncle visits.

== Cast ==
- Ernie Lotinga as Jimmy Josser
- Molly Lamont as Julia Kaye
- Charles Hickman as Eddie Kaye
- Reginald Gardiner as Donald
- Wallace Lupino as Uncle Abel
- Joan Wyndham as little lady
- Arty Ash as Hank

== Reception ==
Kine Weekly wrote: "Broad farcical comedy, the latest recruit from the 'Josser' stable, runs true to form, but the quality of the entertainment is somewhat marred by unnecessary vulgarity. ... Ernie Lotinga's methods are crude, but he puts plenty of energy into his performance and knows how to score with an old gag, and circumvent the censor when it comes to delivering a broad innuendo."

Film Weekly wrote: "A typical Josser picture, full of broad farcical comedy and hearty gags. Some of the humour is of the near-the-knuckle variety, but Ernie Lotinga works hard in the title role and his antics should amuse those who liked his previous pictures."

Picturegoer wrote: "Vulgarity mars this broad slap-stick farce ... It is all very forced with broad jokes, female impersonation and an attempt at a little love interest."
