= The Man from Chicago =

1930 film directed by Walter Summers

- Theatrical release poster
- Directed by: Walter Summers
- Written by: Walter C. Mycroft; Walter Summers
- Based on: play by Reginald Simpson
- Produced by: John Maxwell
- Starring: Bernard Nedell; Dodo Watts; Joyce Kennedy
- Cinematography: Walter J. Harvey; James Wilson
- Edited by: Leslie Norman
- Production company: British International Pictures
- Distributed by: Wardour Films
- Release date: 22 October 1930
- Running time: 88 minutes
- Country: United Kingdom
- Language: English

The Man from Chicago is a 1930 British crime film directed by Walter Summers and starring Bernard Nedell, Dodo Watts, Joyce Kennedy and Austin Trevor. It was written by Walter C. Mycroft and Summers from a play by Reginald Simpson. It was produced at Elstree Studios by British International Pictures.

== Synopsis ==
The screenplay concerns an American gangster who moves to Britain and begins to take on the British criminal underworld.

== Cast ==
- Bernard Nedell as Nick Dugan
- Dodo Watts as Cherry Henderson
- Joyce Kennedy as Irma Russell
- Morris Harvey as Rossi
- Albert Whelan as Sgt. Mostyn
- Austin Trevor as Inspector Drew
- Billy Milton as Barry Larwood
- O. B. Clarence as John Larwood
- Dennis Hoey as Jimmy Donovan
- Ben Welden as Ted

== Reception ==
Film Weekly wrote: "Here is a happy instance of Britain poaching successfully on Holywopd's preserves. It has most of the movement and snap of American -crook films, and, in addition, a little extra polish and smoothness of detail that is due to Walter Summers' enterprising direction and Bernard Nedell's fine acting."

Kine Weekly wrote: "An excellent crook drama, skilfully adapted from the play, which has the slickness and easy movement of the American drama of this character, while retaining English characterisation and atmosphere. Bernard Nedell makes a superb villain, and contributes in no small measure to the success of the entertainment. Direction and supporting characterisation are good."

The New York Times wrote: "The Man From Chicago ... is certainly superior to the average British product. Yet its central figure conforms to a screen convention in gangsters which has long since been outmoded on this side of the water, and the result is an artificiality which hurts the entire production."

Variety wrote: "In characteristic British fashion the script writer and director cast logic to the wind. This disregard of all fan intelligence in an ungainly effort to reach for what the Britishers think must be box office features among many reasons for overseas product getting such a cold return here. ... Painful detail over inconsequentials is another trait again manifest in this British release. Repetition of conversation and antiquated dialog interspersed with such Quixotic emphasis as 'You swine,' etc mingle with lengthy footage devoted to a couple of mechanics ambling about a garage."
