= Luella A. Varney Serrao =

American sculptor

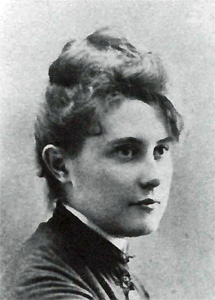
- Luella Varney as a young sculptor in Rome
- Born: Luella A. Varney; August 11, 1863; Angola, New York
- Died: December 26, 1948 (aged 85); Poughkeepsie, New York
- Known for: Sculpture
- Spouse: Teodoro Serrao (m. 1893; died 1907)
- Children: Arthur Varney

Luella A. Varney Serrao (August 11, 1863 – December 26, 1948) was an American sculptor. She was known for her portraits of notable Americans.

== Biography ==
Serrao née Varney was born on August 11, 1863, in Angola, New York. She moved to Cleveland as a young girl, where she studied at the Cleveland School of Art. After high school she moved to Rome, Italy where she earned a degree from the University of Rome. In Rome she met the lawyer Teodoro Serrao whom she married there on February 12, 1893. They lived in Rome. Upon his death in 1907 she returned to Cleveland.

Serrao created portraits of Susan B. Anthony, William Howard Brett, Mary Baker Eddy, Julia Ward Howe, Theodore Roosevelt, Mark Twain and Henry Mower Rice.

She exhibited her work at the Pennsylvania Academy of the Fine Arts and the Art Institute of Chicago.

Serrao exhibited her work at the Palace of Fine Arts and The Woman's Building at the 1893 World's Columbian Exposition in Chicago, Illinois.

Her work An Archbishop of Odessa can be found in the Roman Catholic Church in Odessa, Russia.

She died in 1948, aged 85.

The movie director Arthur Varney was her son.

== Gallery ==
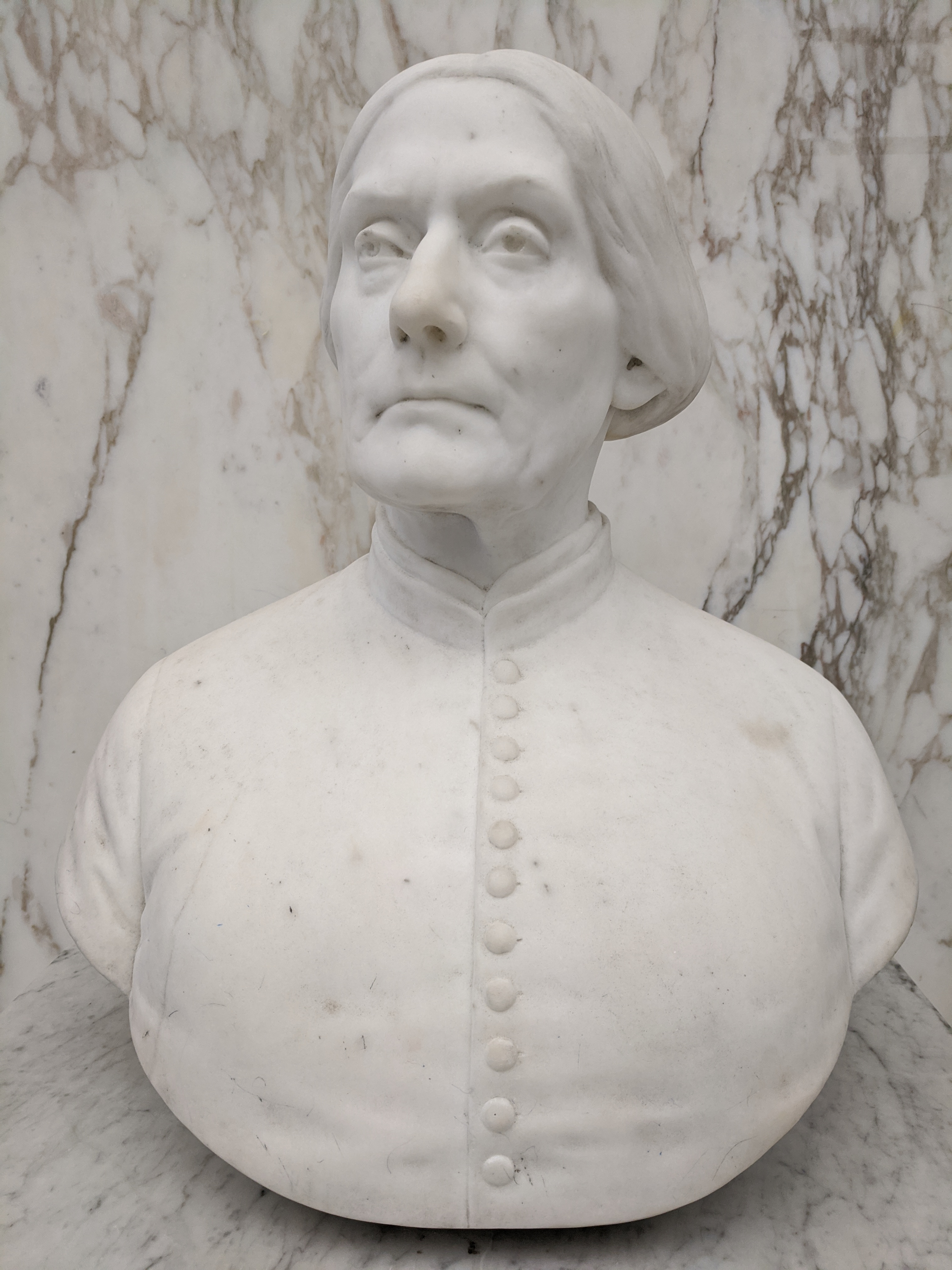
Susan B. Anthony, c. 1884

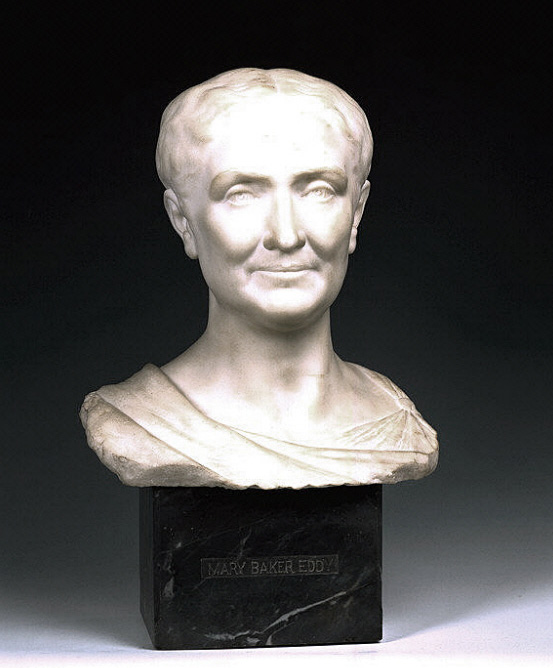
Mary Baker Eddy, c. 1889

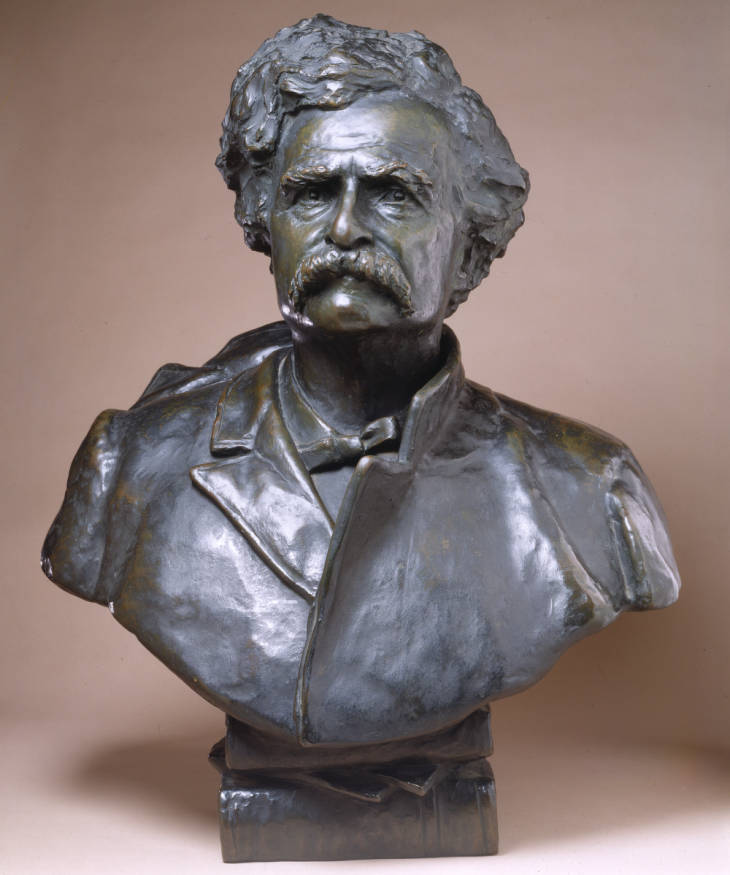
Mark Twain, c. 1892

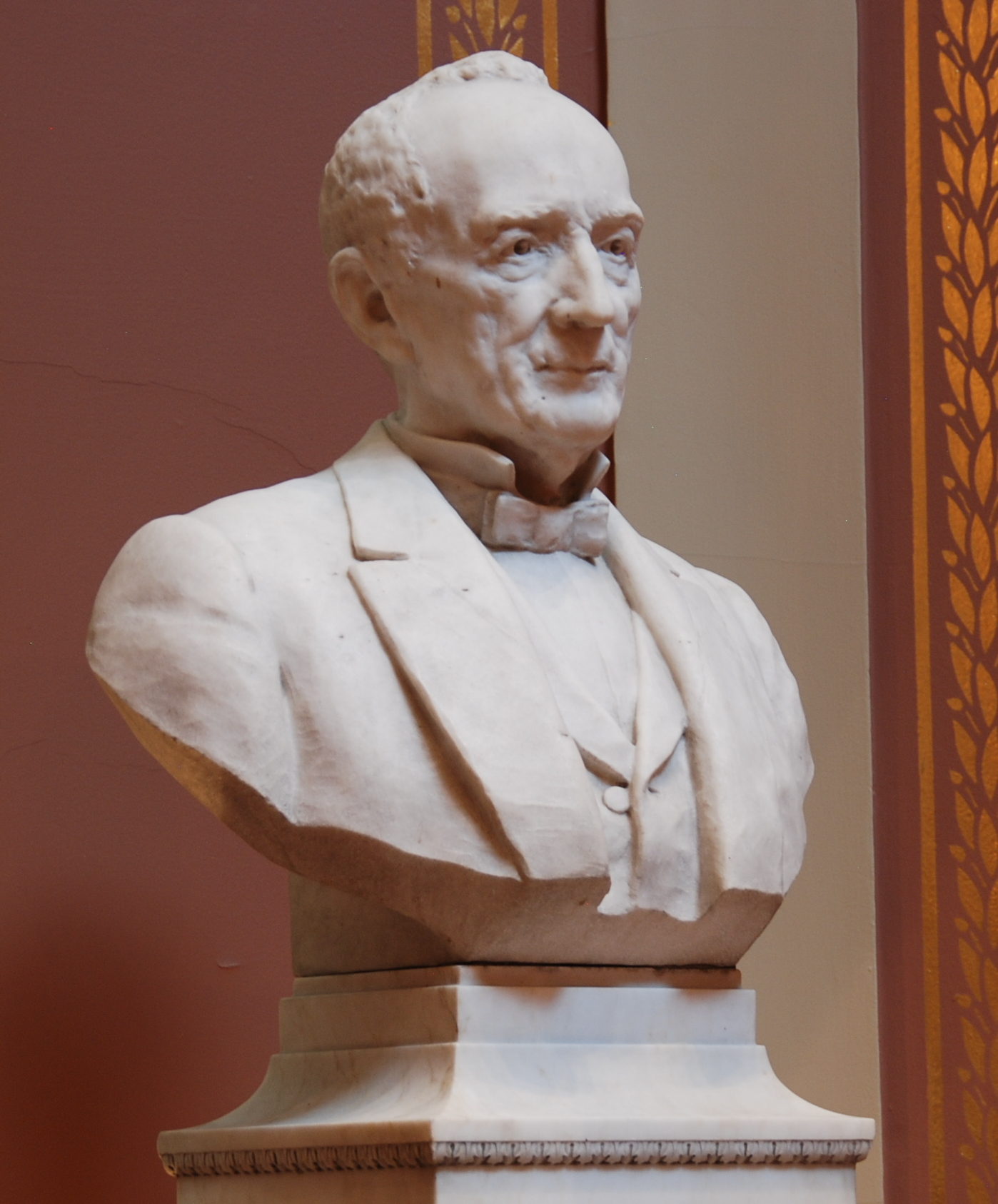
Henry Rice, c. 1910

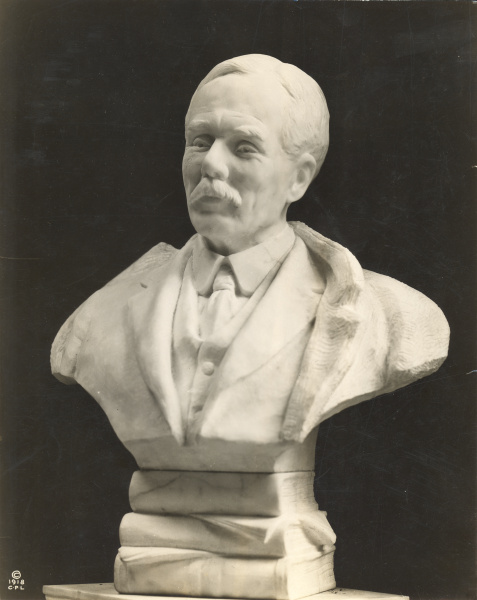
William Howard Brett, c. 1918
