= Lucky Corrigan =

- Directed by: Lewis D. Collins
- Written by: Philip Conway
- Produced by: Kenneth J. Bishop
- Starring: William Gargan; Molly Lamont; James McGrath
- Cinematography: William Beckway; Harry Forbes
- Edited by: William Austin
- Production company: Central Films
- Distributed by: Columbia Pictures
- Release date: September 1936
- Running time: 66 minutes
- Countries: Canada; United States
- Language: English

Lucky Corrigan or Fury and the Woman is a 1936 American-Canadian drama film directed by Lewis D. Collins and starring William Gargan, Molly Lamont and James McGrath.

It was later screened at the 1984 Festival of Festivals as part of Front & Centre, a special retrospective program of artistically and culturally significant films from throughout the history of Canadian cinema.

== Cast ==
- William Gargan as Bruce Corrigan
- Molly Lamont as June McCrae
- James McGrath as Kinky Kinkaid
- Reginald Hincks as Engineer
- J.P. McGowan as Anderson
- Libby Taylor as Sarah
- Henry Hastings as Ling
- Ernie Impett as Bart
- Arthur Kerr as Lester
- Bob Rideout as Red
- David Clyde as McCrae

== Bibliography ==
- Mike Gasher. Hollywood North: The Feature Film Industry in British Columbia. UBC Press, 2002.
