= Robert Coote =

English actor (1909–1982)

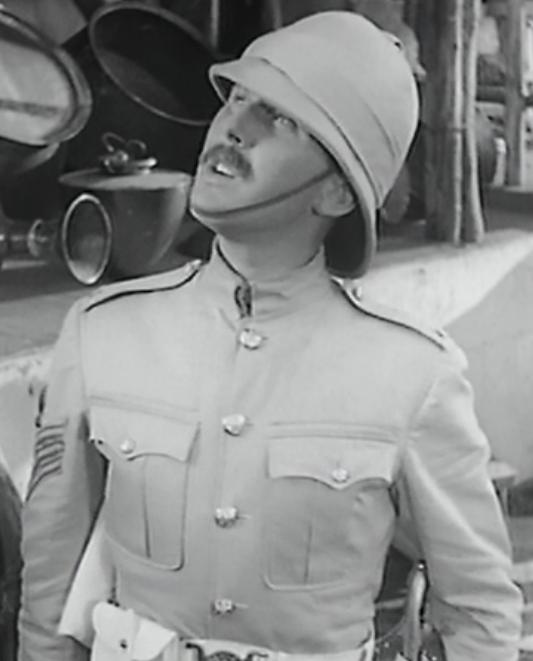
- Coote in the trailer for Gunga Din (1939).
- Born: 4 February 1909; London, England
- Died: 26 November 1982 (aged 73); New York City, New York, U.S.
- Education: Hurstpierpoint College
- Occupation: Actor
- Years active: 1931–1981
- Father: Bert Coote
- Military career
- Allegiance: Canada
- Branch: Royal Canadian Air Force
- Service years: 1940-1946
- Rank: Squadron leader

Robert Coote (4 February 1909 – 26 November 1982) was an English screen and stage actor. He played aristocrats or British military types in many Hollywood films, and originated the role of Colonel Pickering in the long-running original Broadway production of My Fair Lady, earning a Tony Award nomination for Best Featured Actor in a Musical.

== Early life ==
Coote was born in London, the son of vaudevillian and playwright Bert Coote. He was educated at Hurstpierpoint College in Sussex, but left at age 16 to join a touring repertory company, performing performing in Britain, South Africa, and Australia. He made his West End debut in 1931.

== Career ==
Coote worked on the London stage and appeared in minor roles in British films, appearing in the 1936 Australian film Rangle River. He arrived in Hollywood in the late 1930s, beginning with 1937's The Thirteenth Chair. He played a succession of pompous British types in supporting roles, including a brief but memorable turn as Sgt. Bertie Higginbotham in Gunga Din (1939).

His acting career was interrupted by his service as a squadron leader in the Royal Canadian Air Force during World War II. During his service, he organized entertainment shows at CFB Rockcliffe. He played Bob Trubshawe in Powell and Pressburger's A Matter of Life and Death (1946), chosen for the first-ever Royal Film Performance on 1 November 1946, before he returned to Hollywood, where his films included The Ghost and Mrs. Muir (1947), Forever Amber (1947), The Three Musketeers (1948), and Orson Welles' Othello (1951).

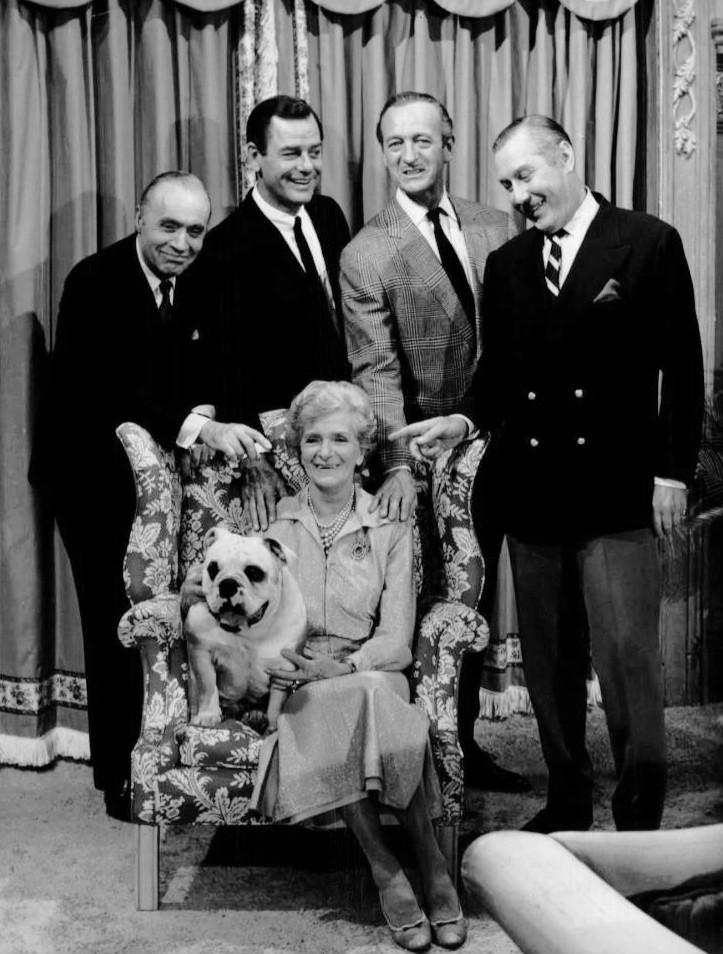
The cast of The Rogues (1964) television series with Charles Boyer, Gig Young, David Niven, Robert Coote and Gladys Cooper

In 1956, Coote created the role of Colonel Pickering in the original Broadway production of My Fair Lady (1956–62), which he reprised in the musical's 1976–77 Broadway revival. He was nominated for a Tony Award for Best Featured Actor in a Musical in 1957 for his performance. He also originated the role of King Pellinore in the Broadway production of Camelot (1960–63).

He was nominated for an Emmy Award for his performance as Timmy St. Clair in the NBC TV series The Rogues (1964–65). In 1966, Coote appeared with Jackie Gleason and Art Carney in an episode of The Honeymooners entitled "The Honeymooners in England", broadcast on CBS-TV from Miami.

In 1973, in his last feature film performance, Coote portrayed one of the critics dispatched by Vincent Price in Theatre of Blood.

Coote guest-starred in an episode of the 1979 NBC television anthology series $weepstake$. His final role was on television, playing orchid nurse Theodore Horstmann in the 1981 NBC-TV series Nero Wolfe, starring William Conrad in the title role. In most film and TV adaptations of Nero Wolfe mysteries, before and since, Horstmann has been a very minor character, but Coote's Horstmann got considerable screen time in the series.

== Personal life ==
Coote was a close friend of fellow actor David Niven, sharing a house with Niven for a time in the late 1930s and living in a flat over Niven's garage for several years after the Second World War.

=== Death ===
Coote died in his sleep at the New York Athletic Club in November 1982, at the age of 73.

== Partial filmography ==
- Sally in Our Alley (1931) as Waiter At Party (uncredited)
- Loyalties (1933) as Robert
- Radio Parade of 1935 (1934) as Executive
- Rangle River (1936) as Reggie Mannister, Flight-Lieutenant
- The Thirteenth Chair (1937) as Stanby
- The Sheik Steps Out (1937) as Lord Eustace Byington
- A Yank at Oxford (1938) as Wavertree
- Blond Cheat (1938) as Gilbert Potts
- The Girl Downstairs (1938) as Karl, Paul's Butler
- Mr. Moto's Last Warning (1939) as Rollo Venables
- Gunga Din (1939) as Sgt. Bertie Higginbotham
- The House of Fear (1939) as Robert Morton
- Bad Lands (1939) as Eaton
- Nurse Edith Cavell (1939) as Bungey
- Vigil in the Night (1940) as Dr. Caley
- You Can't Fool Your Wife (1940) as 'Batty' Battincourt
- Commandos Strike at Dawn (1942) as Robert Bowen
- Forever and a Day (1943) as Blind Officer
- A Matter of Life and Death (1946) as Bob Trubshawe
- Cloak and Dagger (1946) as Cronin (uncredited)
- The Ghost and Mrs. Muir (1947) as Mr. Coombe
- Lured (1947) as Detective
- The Exile (1947) as Dick Pinner
- Forever Amber (1947) as Sir Thomas Dudley
- Berlin Express (1948) as Sterling
- The Three Musketeers (1948) as Aramis
- The Red Danube (1949) as Brigadier C.M.V. Catlock
- The Elusive Pimpernel (1950) as Sir Andrew ffloulkes
- Soldiers Three (1951) as Maj. Mercer
- The Lavender Hill Mob (1951) as Waiter in Restaurant (uncredited)
- The Desert Fox: The Story of Rommel (1951) as British Medical Officer (uncredited)
- Othello (1951) as Roderigo
- Scaramouche (1952) as Gaston Binet
- The Merry Widow (1952) as Marquis De Crillon
- The Prisoner of Zenda (1952) as Fritz von Tarlenheim
- The Constant Husband (1955) as Friends and Relations: The Best Man
- The Swan (1956) as Capt. Wunderlich
- Merry Andrew (1958) as Dudley Larabee
- The Horse's Mouth (1958) as Sir William Beeder
- The League of Gentlemen (1960) as Bunny Warren
- The V.I.P.s (1963) as John Coburn
- The Rogues (1964–1965, TV Series) as Timmy St. Clair
- The Golden Head (1964) as Braithwaite
- A Man Could Get Killed (1966) as Hatton / Jones
- The Swinger (1966) as Sir Hubert Charles
- The Cool Ones (1967) as Stanley Krumley
- The Whitehall Worrier (1967, TV series) as Rt. Hon. Mervyn Pugh
- Prudence and the Pill (1968) as Henry Hardcastle
- Kenner (1969) as Henderson
- Up the Front (1972) as General Burke
- Theatre of Blood (1973) as Oliver Larding
- Institute for Revenge (1979, TV Movie) as Wellington
- Nero Wolfe (1981, TV Series) as Theodore Horstmann (final appearance)

== Partial stage credits ==
- Our Peg (1919–20)
- Frederica (1930–31)
- Wild Violets (1932–33) - Algernon Rutherford
- Mother of Pearl (1933–34)
- The Love of Four Colonels (1953) - Colonel Desmond De S. Rinder-Sparrow
- Someone Waiting (1953–54) - John Nedlow
- Dear Charles (1954–55) - Sir Michael Anstruther
- My Fair Lady (1956–57) - Colonel Pickering
- My Fair Lady (1958) - Colonel Pickering
- Camelot (1960–63) - Pellinore
- A Talent to Amuse (1969)
- The Magistrate (1969–70) - Colonel Luckyn
- The Jockey Club Stakes (1970–71) - Colonel Sir Robert Richardson
- The Jockey Club Stakes (1973) - Colonel Sir Robert Richardson
- Birds of Paradise (1973) - Major Farmer
- Birds of Paradise (1974–75) - Major Farmer
- My Fair Lady (1976–77) - Colonel Pickering
- Bedroom Farce (1979) - Ernest

== Awards and nominations ==
| Award | Year | Category | Work | Result |
|---|---|---|---|---|
| Tony Award | 1957 | Best Featured Actor in a Musical | My Fair Lady | Nominated |
