= Alibi Inn =

1935 British film by Walter Tennyson

- Directed by: Walter Tennyson
- Written by: Muriel Box; Sydney Box
- Produced by: Walter Tennyson
- Starring: Molly Lamont; Ben Welden; Olive Sloane
- Production company: Central Film Productions
- Distributed by: Metro-Goldwyn-Mayer
- Release date: 28 November 1935
- Running time: 53 minutes
- Country: United Kingdom
- Language: English

Alibi Inn is a 1935 British crime drama film directed by Walter Tennyson and starring Molly Lamont, Ben Welden and Olive Sloane. It was produced as a quota quickie for distribution by Metro-Goldwyn-Mayer.

== Synopsis ==
A young inventor is wrongfully accused of killing a night watchmen committed by a gang during a jewel robbery.

== Cast ==
- Molly Lamont as Mary Talbot
- Frederick Bradshaw as Jack Lawton
- Ben Welden as Saunders
- Gladys Jennings as Anne
- Olive Sloane as Oueenie
- Brian Buchel as Masters
- Wilfrid Hyde-White as Husband

== Bibliography ==
- Chibnall, Steve. Quota Quickies: The Birth of the British 'B' Film. British Film Institute, 2007.
- Low, Rachael. Filmmaking in 1930s Britain. George Allen & Unwin, 1985.
- Wood, Linda. British Films, 1927-1939. British Film Institute, 1986.
