= Josser in the Army =

1932 film

- Feature on the film from Picture Show (25 February 1933)
- Directed by: Norman Lee
- Written by: Frank Launder; Herbert Sargent; Con West
- Produced by: John Maxwell
- Starring: Ernie Lotinga; Betty Norton; Jack Hobbs
- Production company: British International Pictures
- Distributed by: Wardour Films
- Release date: 11 October 1932
- Running time: 82 minutes
- Country: United Kingdom
- Language: English

Josser in the Army is a 1932 British war comedy film directed by Norman Lee and starring Ernie Lotinga, Betty Norton, Jack Hobbs. It was written by Frank Launder, Herbert Sargent and

, and was part of the Josser series of films featuring Lotinga. It was made at Elstree Studios by British International Pictures.

== Synopsis ==
Following the outbreak of the First World War in 1914, factory foreman Jimmy Josser joins the regiment of his employer. While serving on the western front he manages to thwart a plan by German secret agents.

== Cast ==
- Ernie Lotinga as Jimmy Josser
- Betty Norton as Joan
- Jack Hobbs as Paul Langdon
- Hal Gordon as Parker
- Jack Frost as Ginger
- Arnold Bell as Becker
- Harold Wilkinson as Seeley

== Reception ==
Film Weekly wrote: "Serious criticism is negatived by the frankly 'popular' nature of the whole affair. The story is mainly an excuse for the introduction of hearty 'gags', and serves its purpose by placing Josser in a variety of farcical situations."

Kine Weekly wrote: "Norman Lee has exploited the star's particular brand of humour well. It is all very broad, rather obvious, and unoriginal, but there is no doubt that he succeeds in getting a full quota of laughs from the way he has handled the material at his command."

Picturegoer wrote: "Wartime comedies have been played to death, and this one is not redeemed by originality."

Picture Show wrote: "Very broad comedy which is near the knuckle at times, but acted with plenty of gusto."
