= Three Sisters of the Moors =

- Directed by: John Larkin
- Written by: Tom Bridges; George Root Jr.
- Starring: Cedric Hardwicke; Molly Lamont; Lynne Roberts
- Cinematography: Virgil Miller
- Production company: Twentieth Century Fox
- Distributed by: Twentieth Century Fox
- Release date: September 8, 1944
- Running time: 20 minutes
- Country: United States
- Language: English

Three Sisters of the Moors is a 1944 American short historical film directed by John Larkin and starring Cedric Hardwicke, Molly Lamont and Lynne Roberts. It portrays the life of the Brontë sisters. The film was released by 20th Century Fox as part of the promotional campaign by the studio for the large-budget Jane Eyre costume drama.

== Cast ==
- Cedric Hardwicke as Reverend Brontë
- Molly Lamont as Charlotte Brontë
- Lynne Roberts as Emily Brontë
- Heather Angel as Anne Brontë
- Grayce Hampton as Martha
- Lydia Bilbrook as Mrs. Gaskell
- Colin Campbell as Clerk
- Marga Ann Deighton as Townswoman
- Leslie Denison as Dickens
- Elspeth Dudgeon as Townswoman
- Alan Edmiston as Reader
- Arthur Gould-Porter as Thackery
- Denis Green as Mr. Smith
- Thomas Louden as Bookseller
- Ottola Nesmith as Townswoman
- Tom Stevenson as Mr. Winton

== Bibliography ==
- Quinlan, David. Quinlan's Film Stars. Batsford, 2000.
