= Bracelets (film) =

1931 British film by Sewell Collins

- Opening titles
- Directed by: Sewell Collins
- Written by: Sewell Collins (play and screenplay)
- Produced by: L'Estrange Fawcett
- Starring: Bert Coote; Joyce Kennedy; Harold Huth
- Cinematography: Percy Strong
- Production company: Gaumont British Picture Corporation
- Distributed by: Gaumont British Distributors
- Release date: February 1931
- Running time: 50 minutes
- Country: United Kingdom
- Language: English

Bracelets is a 1931 British crime film directed by Sewell Collins and starring Bert Coote, Joyce Kennedy and Harold Huth. It was written by Collins from his stage play.

== Plot ==
Jeweller Edwin Hobbett is targeted by confidence tricksters pretending to be connected with the exiled Russian Royal Family. He manages to turn the tables on them, and, after collecting the reward for their arrest, uses the money to buy silver bracelets for his wife to celebrate their wedding anniversary.

== Cast ==
- Bert Coote as Edwin Hobbett
- Joyce Kennedy as Annie Moran
- D. A. Clarke-Smith as Joe le Sage
- Margaret Emden as Mrs. Hobbett
- Frederick Leister as Slim Symes
- Stella Arbenina as Countess Soumbatoff
- Harold Huth as Maurice Dupont
- George Merritt as director

== Production ==
The film was made as a second feature by the Gaumont British Picture Corporation and filmed at the Lime Grove Studios in Shepherd's Bush with sets designed by the art director Andrew Mazzei.

== Reception ==
Film Weekly wrote: "Bert Coote stumbles magnificently through the story as a jeweller. He is just muddle-headed enough and, like the true comedian he is, never forgets to be pathetic, even when he is being humorous."

Kine Weekly wrote: "The well-known stage comedian, Bert Coote, scores a big success in this, his first starring role. It is an amusing crook comedy, well characterised and well directed."

The Daily Film Renter wrote: "Bert Coote's well-known dreaminess-cum-hesitant-muddle-headedness-cum-gaucherie, which he has popularised in his music-hall sketches, is brought to the screen in this new Gaumont-British production. He is starred in a story which enables him to do all those things that audiences expect him to do – and the result is a comedy film which, though on the quiet side, will make a distinctly favourable impression."
