= Arthur Varney =

American screenwriter and film director (1893–1960)

- Born: Amerigo Serrao; 1893; Italy
- Died: November 22, 1960 (aged 66–67); New Jersey, United States
- Other name: Grover Lee
- Occupations: Director, Producer, Writer
- Years active: 1927-1947 (film)

Arthur Varney was an Italian-born American screenwriter and film director. Born as Amerigo Serrao in 1893 to the sculptor Luella A. Varney Serrao and her husband Teodoro Serrao, he emigrated to the United States and became a naturalized citizen. In the 1930s he found work on the British film industry as Arthur Varney, and occasionally also used the credit of Grover Lee. He died in 1960.

== Selected filmography ==
=== Director ===
- Winds of the Pampas (1927)
- The Road to Fortune (1930)
- The Wrong Mr. Perkins (1931)
- The Eternal Feminine (1931)
- Almost a Divorce (1931)
- Get That Venus (1933)

== Bibliography ==
- Koszarski, Richard. Hollywood on the Hudson: Film and Television in New York from Griffith to Sarnoff. Rutgers University Press, 2008.
