= Joyce Kennedy =

British actress (1898–1943)

- Born: 1 July 1898; London, England, United Kingdom
- Died: 12 March 1943 (aged 44); London, England, United Kingdom
- Occupations: Film actress Stage actress
- Years active: 1930 - 1939 (film)

Joyce Kennedy (1898–1943) was a British stage and film actress. During the 1930s she appeared in a number of British films playing a mixture of leading and supporting roles.

== Selected filmography ==
Year	Title	Role	Notes
1930	The Man from Chicago	Irma Russell	
1931	Bracelets	Annie Moran	
1932	Say It with Music	Mrs. Weston	
1934	The Return of Bulldog Drummond	Irma Peterson	
1934	Dangerous Ground	Claire Breedon	
1935	The Black Mask	Lady McTavish	
1936	Seven Sinners	Elizabeth Wentworth	
1936	Twelve Good Men	Lady Thora	
1936	Hail and Farewell	Mrs. Harvey	
1937	Big Fella	Mrs. Oliphant	

== Bibliography ==
- Fearnow, Mark. The American Stage and the Great Depression: A Cultural History of the Grotesque. Cambridge University Press, 1997.
- Sutton, David R. A chorus of raspberries: British film comedy 1929-1939. University of Exeter Press, 2000.
