= Ernie Lotinga =

British actor and comedian (1876–1951)

- Born: Ernest Lotinga; 19 March 1875; Sunderland, County Durham, England
- Died: 29 October 1951 (aged 76); Hammersmith, London, England
- Occupations: Comedian, film actor
- Years active: 1890s–c.1950

Ernest Lotinga (19 March 1875 – 28 October 1951) was a British comedian and film actor. Lotinga became known for the Josser character whom he portrayed in a series of comedy films during the 1930s.

== Biography ==
Lotinga was born in Sunderland into a middle class Jewish family of partly Danish origin. His father was a respected community leader who part-financed the local synagogue. Ernest left school early and moved to London, where he worked as a baker's assistant and was able to watch music hall performances by Dan Leno and others. He began his stage career by performing Leno's sketches, under the stage name Dan Roe (or Roy), and by the late 1890s developed a strong reputation in his own right as a comedic talent. He joined a touring comedy troupe, the Six Brothers Luck, who also included Shaun Glenville, and in 1901 Lotinga married another popular music hall entertainer, the male impersonator Hetty King.

In 1909, after a poorly-received tour of the United States with the Six Brothers Luck, Lotinga left the troupe, and developed his own act as the character Jimmy Josser, an "irreverent everyman". "Josser" was a slang term for a simpleton. He maintained the Josser character in theatre tours over subsequent decades. For several years he toured widely with Hetty King, including visits to entertain troops in France during the First World War, but King's infidelity with the American singer and songwriter Jack Norworth led to the pair's much-publicised divorce in 1917. Lotinga remarried in 1918, to actress Kathleen Barbor.

Lotinga was a popular success. In 1924, he took a leading role in the farce Khaki, which made fun of army officers and judges, taunted by Lotinga's character. The Lord Chamberlain's Office described the show as "a farrago of idiocy, vulgarity and sham sentiment", and Lotinga was obliged to rewrite the script. After seeing him perform on stage in 1927, T. S. Eliot wrote to Virginia Woolf that Lotinga was "magnificent... the greatest living British histrionic artist, in the purest tradition of British obscenity." He was also portrayed, in character, in the final panel of the sculptural frieze by Gilbert Baynes, Drama Through The Ages, on the Saville Theatre in Shaftesbury Avenue.

In 1928, Lotinga moved into sound films, at first making a series of shorts for DeForest Phonofilms, and then, from 1931, making feature films. These included Doctor Josser K.C. (1931), Josser in the Army (1932), Josser's Detective Agency (1935), and Love Up the Pole (1936), the last of which featured striptease performer Phyllis Dixey, who later toured with Lotinga. The films were again disparaging of authority and were censored by the Lord Chamberlain's Office, but their bawdy, knockabout humour was popular with the public. Lotinga also featured in broadcasts on BBC radio from the mid-1930s.

During the Second World War, he toured and entertained as part of ENSA. Although his style of humour and wordplay became increasingly unfashionable during the 1940s, he continued to perform in theatres as the Josser character.

He died in Hammersmith, London in 1951, aged 76.

== Selected filmography ==
- Doing His Duty (1928) short film featuring Lotinga as Jimmy Josser, made in the Phonofilm sound-on-film system by British Sound Film Corporation
- Spirits (1928), short film made in Phonofilm, directed by Hugh Croise
- The Raw Recruit (1928), short film made in Phonofilm, directed by Hugh Croise
- The Orderly Room (1928), short film made in Phonofilm, directed by Hugh Croise
- Acci-Dental Treatment (1929), short film made in Phonofilm, directed by Thomas Bentley
- P.C. Josser (1931)
- Dr. Josser K.C. (1931)
- Josser on the River (1932)
- Josser in the Army (1932)
- Josser Joins the Navy (1932)
- Josser on the Farm (1934)
- Josser's Detective Agency (1935)
- Smith's Wives (1935)
- Love Up the Pole (1936)

== Bibliography ==
- Sutton, David R. A chorus of raspberries: British film comedy 1929-1939. University of Exeter Press, 2000.
