= Dickie Dowsett =

English footballer (1931–2020)

Personal information
- Full name: Gilbert James Dowsett
- Date of birth: 3 July 1931
- Place of birth: Widford, Essex, England
- Date of death: 19 April 2020 (aged 88)
- Height: 5 ft 8 in (1.73 m)
- Position: Inside forward

Youth career
- Chelmsford City

Senior career*
Years	Team	Apps	(Gls)
19??–1952	Sudbury Town		
1952–1955	Tottenham Hotspur	1	(1)
1955–1956	Southend United	20	(4)
1956–1957	Southampton	2	(0)
1957–1962	Bournemouth & Boscombe Athletic	169	(79)
1962–1965	Crystal Palace	54	(22)
1965–1968	Weymouth	168	(36)
- * Club domestic league appearances and goals

Gilbert James "Dickie" Dowsett (3 July 1931 – 19 April 2020) was an English professional footballer who played for Sudbury Town, Tottenham Hotspur, Southend United, Southampton, Bournemouth & Boscombe Athletic, Crystal Palace and Weymouth.

== Playing career ==
Born in Widford, Essex, Dowsett began his career in the youth section of Chelmsford City, then non-League club Sudbury Town before joining Tottenham Hotspur in May 1952. The inside forward scored a goal in his one senior appearance against Aston Villa on 21 August 1954.

Dowsett transferred to Southend United in May 1955, where he netted four times in 20 matches in the 1955–56 season. Whilst at the Roots Hall club, he was spotted by Frank Dudley, who recommended him to his former colleague Ted Bates, who was now manager at Southampton. He joined Southampton in July 1956 and featured in two league matches and one in the FA Cup but was unable to stake a claim for a regular place in the first team.

Dowsett signed for Bournemouth & Boscombe Athletic in June 1957, for a fee of £100. At Dean Court, Dowsett was converted from a winger into an inside forward with great success. In the five years with Bournemouth, he was the club's top scorer in three seasons. Described as "determined, fast and useful in the air", the free scoring player found the net on 79 occasions in 169 matches. Bournemouth's current club badge features the highly regarded player's profile.

In November 1962, he joined Crystal Palace for a fee of £3500; at the Selhurst Park club, he notched up a further 22 goals in 54 league appearances. In June 1965, Dowsett went on to play for Weymouth of the Southern League, where he ended his competitive career. In his first season at Weymouth, he helped the club take the Southern League Championship for the second successive season.

== Post–football career ==
After retiring from playing, Dowsett returned to Dean Court where he became Bournemouth's commercial manager, holding the post from June 1968 until March 1983.

Dowsett was a member of the Dorset Cricket Society and recalled his football experiences in an after dinner speech he made to members in March 2010.

Dowsett died on 19 April 2020. He had been suffering from dementia.

Dowsett's silhouette is used on the present day AFC Bournemouth club badge.

== Honours ==
Weymouth

- Southern League championship: 1965–66
