= Bert Coote =

British actor (1867–1938)

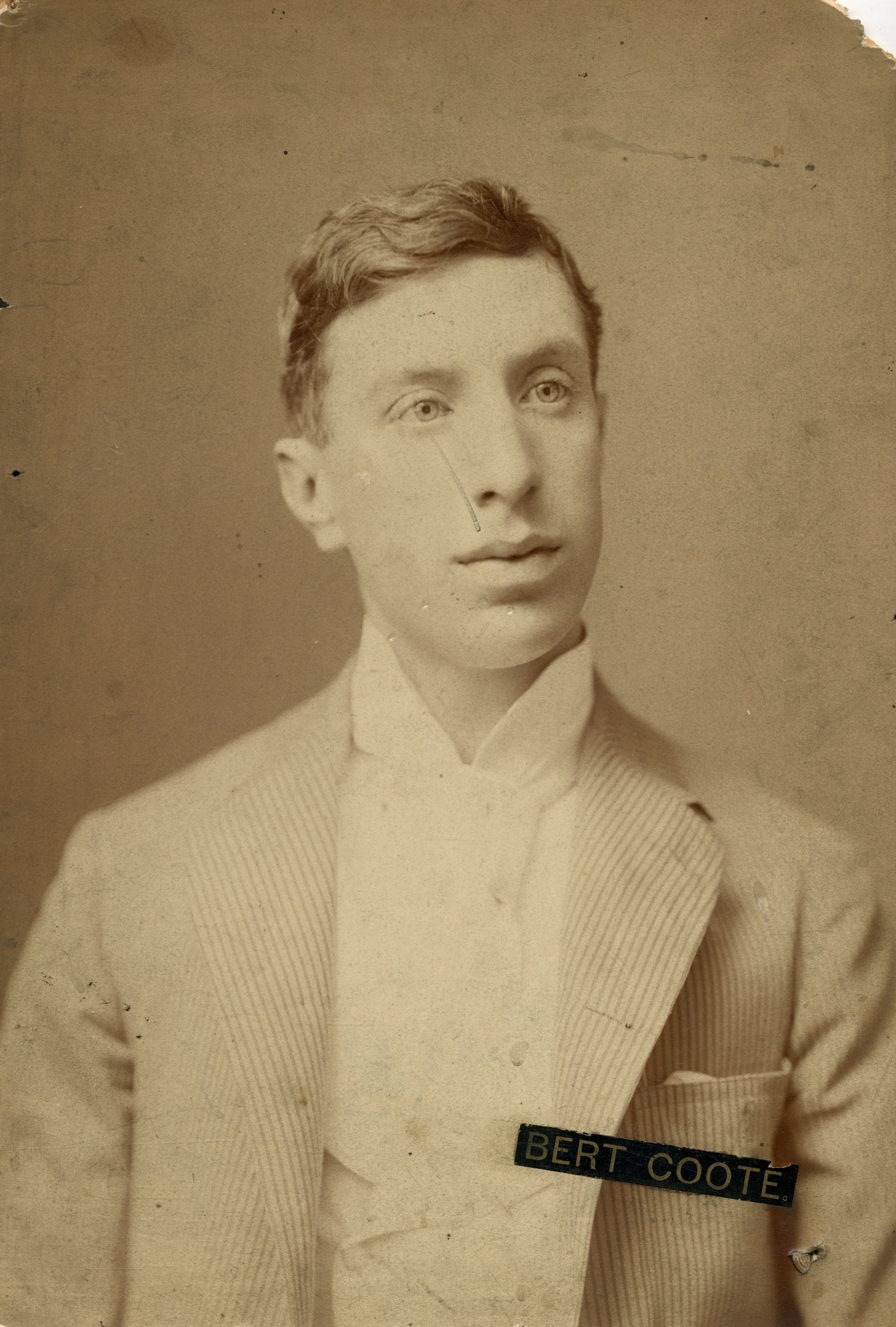
- Born: 1867; London, England, United Kingdom
- Died: 1 September 1938 (aged 70–71); London, England, United Kingdom
- Occupation: Actor
- Years active: 1930–1934 (film)
- Children: Robert Coote

Bert Coote (1867–1938) was a British comedian, vaudeville and music hall entertainer, dramatist, actor, and theatre producer. As a writer and comedian he was best known for creating and starring in several short comedic sketches and one act plays which he performed in British music halls and in American vaudeville from the 1880s into the early twentieth century. These included The New Boy, The Battle Scarred Hero, A Supper for Two (with the actress Marie Pavey), and A Lamb on Wall Street; the latter of which was his most famous and successful work. In his later life he worked as a producer on the West End in London; notably producing Frederick Bowyer's The Windmill Man at the Victoria Palace Theatre. He also appeared in several films, including the lead role in the 1931 crime film Bracelets.

He is the father of the actor Robert Coote.

== Filmography ==
- Greek Street (1930)
- Such Is the Law (1930)
- Bracelets (1931)
- Two Hearts in Waltz Time (1934)

== Bibliography ==
- Low, Rachael. Filmmaking in 1930s Britain. George Allen & Unwin, 1985.
- Parker, John. Who's who in the Theatre. Pitman, 1972.
