= Dr. Josser K.C. =

1931 film by Norman Lee

- Trade advertisement
- Directed by: Norman Lee
- Written by: Norman Lee; Ernie Lotinga
- Produced by: Norman Lee
- Starring: Ernie Lotinga; Jack Hobbs; Molly Lamont
- Production company: British International Pictures
- Distributed by: Wardour Films
- Release date: 4 November 1931
- Running time: 71 minutes
- Country: United Kingdom
- Language: English

Dr. Josser K.C. (also known as Doctor Josser K.C.) is a 1931 British comedy film directed by Norman Lee and starring Ernie Lotinga, Jack Hobbs and Molly Lamont. It was written by Lee and Lotinga. Made at Elstree Studios it was one of the Josser series of comedies featuring Lotinga.

== Plot ==
Escaped crook Jimmy Josser witnesses Dick O'Neill buying a set of compromising letters from Suzette, a French woman. Josser forces his way into O'Neill’s home and demands hush money. Because Dick purchased the letters to protect a friend, he is afraid of his wife finding out; however, unable to pay the blackmail, he has no choice but to let Josser stay in the house. Josser then adopts a false identity, posing as a Scottish doctor who was already expected as a houseguest. Suzette shows up at the house demanding yet more money from O'Neill. Josser and an accomplice masquerade as lawyers. They stage a mock trial, ultimately "convicting" Suzette of being married to one of them and committing bigamy with the other. Through this bizarre charade, the O'Neills' marriage is saved, and the two crooks walk away with a reward.

== Cast ==
- Ernie Lotinga as Jimmy Josser
- Jack Hobbs as Dick O'Neill
- Molly Lamont as Betty O'Neill
- Joan Wyndham as Suzette
- Binnie Barnes as Rosa Wopp
- Harold Wilkinson as Golightly
- Arnold Bell as Dick Morris

== Reception ==
Film Weekly wrote: "Those who like their humour quiet and subtle will-not find much to their liking, but others – and there are many others – who delight in rushabout buffoonery, will discover a lot to amuse them in Lotinga's robust humour and crazy antics."

Kine Weekly wrote: "Humour is of the music-hall type, quite well put over, and if not very original should serve to keep popular audiences thoroughly amused. ... Norman Lee has directed the star effectively, and provided him with suitable backgrounds without recalling the music-hall stage. The plot is not particularly good ... something more hilarious and utterly absurd would have been more suited to Lotinga's buffconery, which, however, gets over without help from the story."

The Daily Film Renter wrote: "Material popular for many years in the form of music-hall sketches, presented here with all the advantages of extended staging possible in the studio. Extravaganza plus, it has the time honoured gags, the high spirits, and usual horseplay, and, like the music-hall material it resembles, should make money in nine towns out of ten."

Picturegoer wrote: "The story is far-fetched and does not matter much, since it is obviously intended only to serve as a background for Lotinga's fooling as an escaped crook, a Scottish doctor, and a barrister."
