= Plymouth Town =

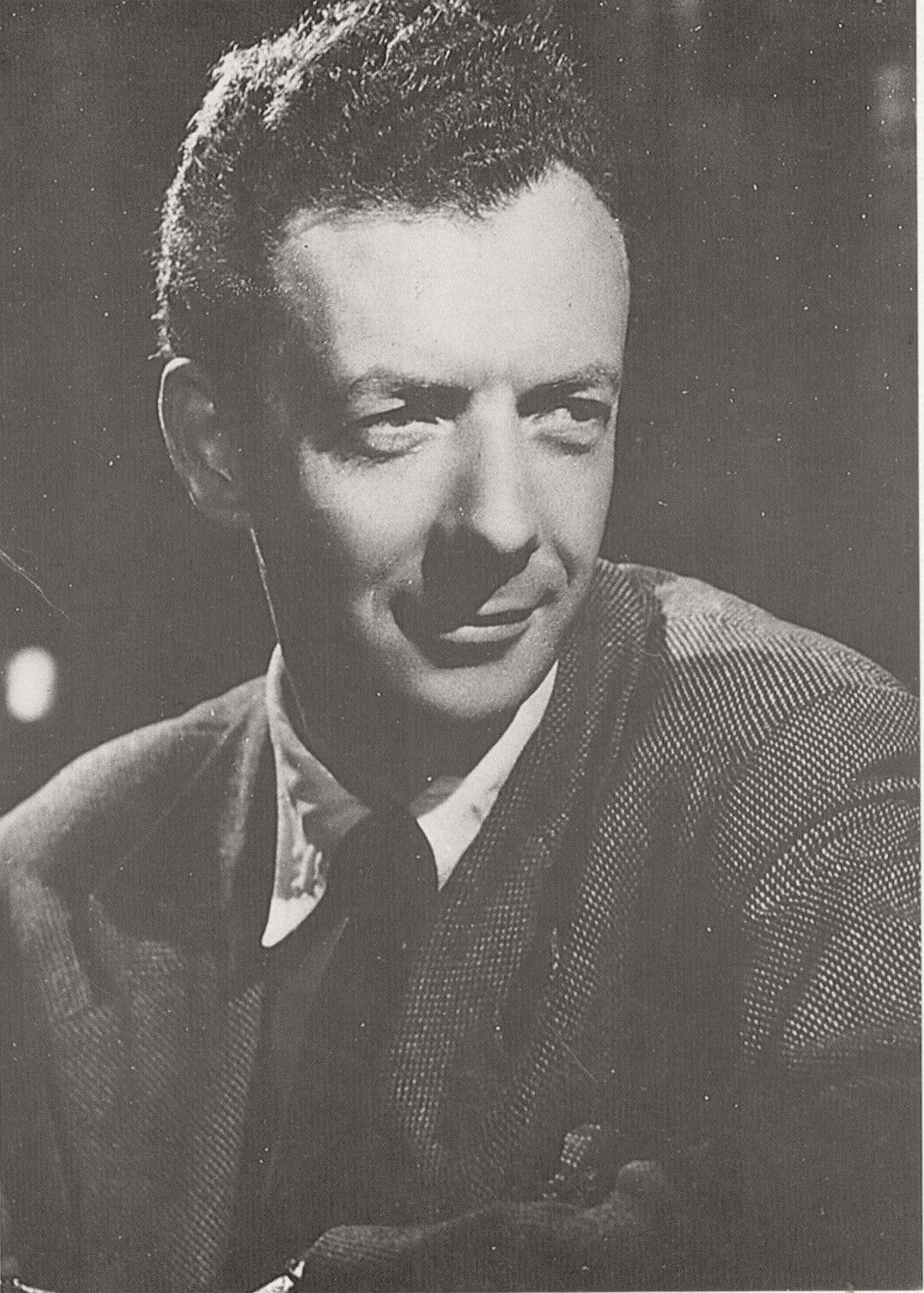
Benjamin Britten in the 1940s

Plymouth Town is a ballet composed by Benjamin Britten in 1931. A typical performance lasts about 25 minutes. It was written between the 12 and 28 August and completed on 22 November 1931, shortly after Britten's first year as a student at the Royal College of Music.

Britten's score is based on the sea shanty "A Roving". The folklorist Violet Alford devised the plot of the ballet. Paul Kildea describes the plot as a "quayside morality tale". The plot of the ballet concerns a sailor led astray by a 'bad girl' who was a "mistress of her trade" as described in "A Roving"; she robs the sailor after the two embark on a pub crawl. The plot was later echoed in Britten's opera Albert Herring.

Plymouth Town was never performed in Britten's lifetime. He sent the score without success to the Camargo Society, a prominent promoter of British ballet. Britten's biographer David Matthews notes the influence of Gustav Mahler on the orchestration of the ballet, a note on the score instructs the horns and clarinets to play "bells up"; an indication that would have only been seen by Britten on the scores of Mahler's symphonies.

John Bridcut describes the piece as a "fascinating harbinger of the mature Britten" with "moments of wit and poignancy, all delivered with an angular energy".

It was first performed at the Royal College of Music, London on 25 January 2004, conducted by Britten specialist, Michael Rosewell. The sole recording of Plymouth Town was made by the BBC Symphony Orchestra in 2005. The ballet was staged for the first time on 1 July 2013 by Chethams's School of Music under conductor Jeremy Pike with dancers from The Hammond Dance School with choreography by Jane Elliot at the Opera Theatre of the Royal Northern College of Music in Manchester.
