= Gordon Barker =

English footballer

Personal information
- Born: 6 July 1931
- Died: 10 February 2006 (aged 74)
- Batting: Right-handed
- Bowling: Right-arm medium

Career statistics
Competition	First-class	List A
Matches	451	56
Runs scored	22,288	1,436
Batting average	29.21	30.55
100s/50s	30/116	0/8
Top score	181*	87*
Balls bowled	439	66
Wickets	5	0
Bowling average	40.00	–
5 wickets in innings	0	–
10 wickets in match	0	–
Best bowling	2/34	–
Catches/stumpings	236/–	14/–
- Source: CricketArchive, 12 April 2023

Gordon Barker
Senior career*
Years	Team	Apps	(Gls)
- Bishop Auckland
1954–1959	Southend United	57	(9)
- Chelmsford City
- * Club domestic league appearances and goals

Gordon Barker (6 July 1931 – 10 February 2006) was an English first-class cricketer who played for Essex. Born in Yorkshire, Barker was a right-handed opening batsman and made his Essex debut in 1954 against the touring Canadians, scoring a century.

Barker passed 1,000 runs in a season every year from 1955 to 1967 with a best of 1,741 runs in 1960. He finished his career with 21,893 runs for Essex.

== Football career ==
Barker also played professional football, and made 57 league appearances for Southend United between 1954 and 1959.
