= Molly Lamont =

British actress (1910–2001)

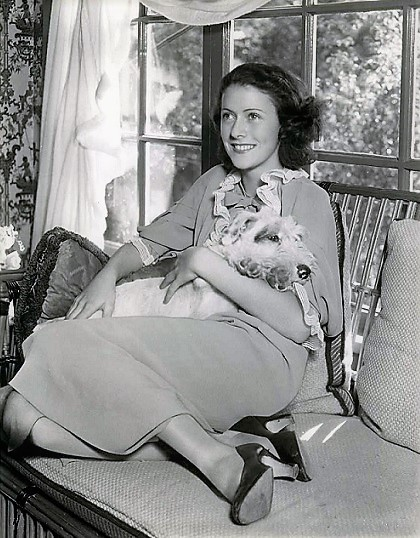
- Lamont in 1935
- Born: 22 May 1910; Boksburg, Transvaal, South Africa
- Died: 7 July 2001 (aged 91); Brentwood, Los Angeles, California, U.S.
- Occupation: Actress
- Years active: 1930–1951
- Spouse: Edward Bellande (m. 1938–1976) (his death)

Molly Lamont (22 May 1910 – 7 July 2001) was a South African-British film actress.

== Life and career ==
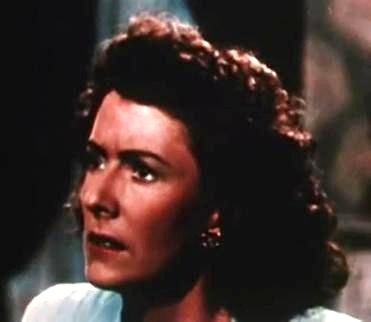
Molly Lamont in Scared to Death (1947)

Margorie Edith Lamont was born in Boksburg, Transvaal, South Africa. She was active in sports as a young woman. She moved to England after winning a beauty contest in her teens. As part of the contest, she was offered a film test by British International Pictures. She began her career in British films in 1930 and for several years played small, often uncredited roles. Her roles began to improve by the mid-1930s, whilst resident in London. She later moved to Hollywood where she got a contract under RKO, played roles such as Cary Grant's fiancée in The Awful Truth (1937). Her other appearances include such popular films as The White Cliffs of Dover and Mr. Skeffington (both 1944). Lamont retired from acting in 1951 with more than fifty films to her credit.

She married aviation pioneer Edward Antoine Bellande, on April 1, 1937. They remained married until his death in 1976. As Mrs. Bellande she remained active in local theatre companies. She died on 7 July 2001 in Brentwood, Los Angeles, aged 91.

== Filmography ==
- The Black Hand Gang (1930) (uncredited)
- Uneasy Virtue (1931) as Ada
- Old Soldiers Never Die (1931) as Ada
- The Wife's Family (1931) as Sally
- Doctor Josser K.C. (1931) (uncredited)
- Strictly Business (1931) as Maureen
- What a Night! (1931) as Nora Livingstone
- Shadows (1931) as Jill Dexter
- The Strangler (1932) as Frances Marsden
- The House Opposite (1932) as Doris
- Brother Alfred (1932) as Stella
- Lucky Girl (1932) as Lady Moira
- The Last Coupon (1932) as Betty Carter
- Josser on the River (1932) as Julia Kaye
- His Wife's Mother (1932) as Cynthia
- Lord Camber's Ladies (1932) as Actress
- Leave It to Me (1933) as Eve Halliday
- Paris Plane (1933)
- Letting in the Sunshine (1933) as Lady Anne
- White Ensign (1934) as Consul's Daughter
- No Escape (1934) as Helen Arnold
- Irish Hearts (1934) as Nurse Otway
- The Third Clue (1934) as Rosemary Clayton
- Murder at Monte Carlo (1935) as Margaret Becker
- Handle with Care (1935) as Patricia
- Oh, What a Night (1935) as Pat
- Rolling Home (1935) as Ann
- Jalna (1935) as Pheasant Vaughn Whiteoaks
- Alibi Inn (1935) as Mary Talbot
- Another Face (1935) as Mary McCall
- Muss 'em Up (1936) as Nancy Harding, Paul's Daughter
- Mary of Scotland (1936) as Mary Livingstone
- Fury and the Woman (1936) as June McCrae
- A Woman Rebels (1936) as Young Girl with Sick Baby (uncredited)
- The Jungle Princess (1936) as Ava
- A Doctor's Diary (1937) as Mrs. Fielding
- The Awful Truth (1937) as Barbara Vance
- Somewhere I'll Find You (1942) as Nurse Winifred (uncredited)
- The Moon and Sixpence (1942) as Mrs. Amy Strickland (uncredited)
- A Gentle Gangster (1943) as Ann Hallit
- Thumbs Up (1943) as Welfare Supervisor
- Follow the Boys (1944) as Miss Hartford (secretary) (uncredited)
- The White Cliffs of Dover (1944) as Helen Hampton (uncredited)
- Mr. Skeffington (1944) as Miss Norris (uncredited)
- Minstrel Man (1944) as Caroline (Mother)
- Youth Runs Wild (1944) as Mrs. Webster (uncredited)
- Three Sisters of the Moors (1944, Short) as Charlotte Brontë
- The Suspect (1944) as Edith Simmons
- Devil Bat's Daughter (1946) as Ellen Masters Morris
- So Goes My Love (1946) as Cousin Garnet Allison
- The Dark Corner (1946) as Lucy Wilding (uncredited)
- Scared to Death (1947) as Laura Van Ee
- Ivy (1947) as Bella Crail
- Christmas Eve (1947) as Harriet Rhodes
- South Sea Sinner (1950) as Kay Williams
- The First Legion (1951) as Mrs. Nora Gilmartin (final film role)

== Bibliography ==
- Quinlan, David (1996). Quinlan's Film Stars. Batsford Books. ISBN 0-7134-7751-2.
- Dix-Peek, Ross (12 May 2008). "Hollywood's South African-born actors of the 1930s and 1940s". Live Journal.
