= The Eternal Feminine (1931 film) =

1931 film

- Theatrical release poster
- Directed by: Arthur Varney
- Written by: Arthur Varney; Brock Williams; Hugh Broadbridge
- Produced by: Arthur Varney
- Starring: Guy Newall; Doria March; Jill Esmond
- Cinematography: Doria March
- Production company: Starcraft
- Distributed by: Paramount Pictures
- Release date: February 1931
- Running time: 82 minutes
- Country: United Kingdom
- Language: English

The Eternal Feminine is a 1931 British drama film directed by Arthur Varney and starring Guy Newall, Doria March and Jill Esmond. It was written by Varney, Brock Williams and Hugh Broadbridge, and made at Twickenham Studios. Its title refers to the psychological archetype of the eternal feminine.

== Cast ==
- Guy Newall as Sir Charles Winthrop
- Doria March as Yvonne de la Roche
- Jill Esmond as Claire Lee
- Garry Marsh as Arthur Williams
- Terence de Marney as Michael Winthrop
- Madge Snell as Lady Winthrop
- Arthur Varney as Al Peters

== Reception ==
Kine Weekly wrote: "Individual characterisation is good, particularly on the part of the male players, and an appropriate atmosphere prevails, but the emotional appeal is slight. ... Guy Newall acts with consummate ease and makes a likeable Charles, Terrance de Marney is good in the difficult emotional role of Michael, while Arthur Varney draws an amusing character-study as an American theatrical producer. Jill Esmond is rather stagey as Claire, and Doria March's performannce as Yvonne is nothing short of a caricature. Arthur Varney, who wrote the story, played a part and directed the picture, has tried to do too much, with the result that the picture has no powerful dramatic sequence. There are too many loose ends, which lead nowhere and only succeed in confusing the main issue. A general sharpening-up, however, could result in the picture becoming a safe attraction for unsophisticated patrons."

Picture Show wrote: "Capably directed and acted."
