= Margery Binner =

British actress (1908–1948)

- 1939 Spotlight photo
- Born: 3 September 1908; Teddington, United Kingdom
- Died: 16 March 1948 (aged 39)
- Occupation: Actress
- Years active: 1931-1935 (film)

Margery Binner (3 September 1908 – 16 March 1948) was a British stage and film actress.

== Selected filmography ==
- Almost a Divorce (1931)
- A Honeymoon Adventure (1931)
- The Officers' Mess (1931)
- Love on the Spot (1932)
- The Good Companions (1933)

== Bibliography ==
- Wearing, J. P. The London Stage 1920-1929: A Calendar of Productions, Performers, and Personnel. Rowman & Littlefield, 2014.
