= Almost a Divorce =

1931 British film by Jack Raymond and Arthur Varney

- Trade show poster
- Directed by: Jack Raymond; Arthur Varney
- Written by: Arthur Varney; Brock Williams
- Produced by: Herbert Wilcox
- Starring: Nelson Keys; Sydney Howard; Margery Binner
- Cinematography: Henry Harris
- Production company: British and Dominions
- Distributed by: Woolf and Freedman
- Release date: 21 August 1931
- Running time: 75 minutes
- Country: United Kingdom
- Language: English

Almost a Divorce is a 1931 British comedy film directed by Jack Raymond and Arthur Varney and starring Nelson Keys, Sydney Howard and Margery Binner. It was written by Varney and Brock Williams, and made at British and Dominion's Elstree Studios.

The film led to a copyright infringement action which was dismissed.

== Cast ==
- Nelson Keys as Richard Leighton
- Sydney Howard as Mackintosh
- Margery Binner as Angela Leighton
- Eva Moore as Aunt Isobel
- Kay Hammond as Maisie
- Kenneth Kove as detective
- Annette Benson
- Paddy Browne
- Annie Esmond
- Peter Penrose as boy

== Reception ==
Kine Weekly wrote: "This domestic comedy has its bright moments, but it is much too long for the subject matter. The co-stars put in good work, but not even their sterling efforts can relieve the picture of unfortunate touches of boredom. ... Sydney Howard gives another one of his inimitable studies as the inebriated Mackintosh, and does all that is possible to keep the entertainment bright. Nelson Keys makes a good foil as the harassed Richard, and Kay Hammond draws an amusing type as Maisie, while Kenneth Kove is delightfully dumb as the house detective."

Film Weekly wrote: "It says much for the ability of Sydney Howard and Nelson Keys that they can still make us chuckle quite a lot, in spite of the superabundant verbiage and the flat production which retard the progress of Almost a Divorce."
