= The Wrong Mr. Perkins =

1931 film

- Directed by: Arthur Varney
- Edited by: Charles Saunders
- Release date: 1931
- Country: United Kingdom
- Language: English

The Wrong Mr. Perkins is a 1931 British short comedy film directed by Arthur Varney and starring Herbert Mundin, John Stuart and Frederick Volpe. The screenplay concerns an impoverished man, Jimmy Perkins, who is mistaken by a banker for a wealthy man with a similar name.

== Cast ==
- Herbert Mundin - Jimmy Perkins
- John Stuart - Larry Byrne
- Frederick Volpe - Sir Trevor Petersham
- Percy Walsh - Mr Mellows

== Bibliography ==
- Shafer, Stephen C. British popular films, 1929-1939: The Cinema of Reassurance. Routledge, 1997.
