= Smith's Wives =

1935 film by Manning Haynes

- Tyrell Davis and Ernie Lotinga in the film
- Directed by: Manning Haynes
- Screenplay by: Con West
- Based on: play Facing the Music by James Darnley
- Starring: Ernie Lotinga; Beryl De Querton; Tyrell Davis
- Cinematography: Alex Bryce
- Production company: Fox-British Pictures
- Release date: 12 August 1935
- Running time: 62 minutes
- Country: United Kingdom
- Language: English

Smith's Wives is a 1935 British comedy film directed by H. Manning Haynes and starring Ernie Lotinga, Beryl de Querton and Tyrell Davis. It was written by Con West based on the 1905 play Facing the Music by James Darnley. It was Lotinga's only film in which he didn't play his trademark character Jimmy Josser.

== Preservation status ==
The British Film Institute National Archive holds a collection of stills but no film or video materials.

== Plot ==
A farcical situation occurs when a vicar and a bookmaker with the same surname are mistaken for each other.

== Cast ==
- Ernie Lotinga as Jimmy Smith
- Beryl de Querton as Norah Smith
- Tyrell Davis as Dick Desmond
- Richard Ritchie as Reverend James Smith
- Kay Walsh as Mabel Smith
- Jean Gillie as Anne
- Vashti Taylor as Dierdre Fotheringay

== Reception ==
The Daily Film Renter wrote: "Involved nature of plot, which is at times difficult to follow, is offset by many amusing incidents and typical fooling by Ernie Lotinga, whose performance is highlight. Capable support, ingeniously timed gags, and smart settings make up supporting feature with mass appeal and additional attraction of star's name. Ernie Lotinga carries this film along by his vigorous comedy, and infects the rest of the cast with the same spirit of fun."

Picturegoer wrote: "Ernie Lotinga indulges in broad comicalities in this conventional farce which, slow in getting off the mark, brightens up under Manning Haynes' competent direction and provides popular entertainment of an artless order."

Picture Show wrote: "Ernie Lotinga as James Smith, bookie, gives a lively and amusing performance, and Tyrrell Davis as Dick Desmond gives a good supporting performance, Beryl de Querton as the outraged wife of the bookie is good, while Kay Walsh is amusing as the wife of the curate. Amusing light entertainment."
