= P.C. Josser =

1931 film

- Directed by: Milton Rosmer
- Written by: Ernie Lotinga (play); Herbert Sargent; Con West
- Produced by: Michael Balcon
- Starring: Ernie Lotinga; Robert Douglas; Garry Marsh
- Cinematography: William Shenton; Horace Wheddon
- Production company: Gainsborough Pictures
- Distributed by: Woolf & Freedman
- Release date: January 1931
- Running time: 71 minutes
- Country: United Kingdom
- Language: English

P.C. Josser (also known as Josser, P.C.) is a 1931 British comedy film directed by Milton Rosmer and starring Ernie Lotinga, Robert Douglas and Garry Marsh. It was written by Herbert Sargent and Con West based on Lotinga's 1926 stage play The Police Force, and made by Gainsborough Pictures at the Islington Studios in London. The film was re-released in 1945.

== Plot ==
After being discharged from the force after an unsuccessful police operation, P.C. Jimmy Josser is hired by Violet Newsome to protect her horse being nobbled before a fixture.

== Cast ==
- Ernie Lotinga as Jimmy Josser
- Jack Frost as Nobby
- Maisie Darrell as Violet Newsome
- Robert Douglas as Dick Summers
- Garry Marsh as Carson
- Max Avieson as Travers

== Reception ==
Kine Weekly wrote: "It some quarters there have been complaints about the stereotyped American broad humour that is so widespread. Here is a picture which is essentially British in this respect, and is in effect the old music-hall fun transferred to the screen. One can foresee it having a very hilarious welcome. It is excellently put over, with effective use of the camera; in no way does the film resemble a photographed music-hall sketch. ... Ernie Lotinga, as we learnt from his short features, comes over excellently on the screen. His broad humour tells every time, and his only difficulty is the timing of gags to avoid their being lost in the general laughter. Garry Marsh makes a very good villain of melodrama, and both Maisie Darrell and Robert Douglas are effective as the lovers."

Film Weekly wrote: "The plot is wildly nonsensical, with a good deal of horseplay and quite a number of heavy 'gags,' such as a man slippng on a banana skin. For those who like their films broad."

The Daily Film Renter wrote: "One of Britain's most popular comedians, Ernie Lotinga, in what should be one of the year's most popular comedies. There is a great public for farce of the Josser description, and with the director, Milton Rosmer, getting an added kick out of a familiar turf extravaganza, one can confidently anticipate crowded houses and shrieks of continuous laughter wherever this is shown."

The Monthly Film Bulletin wrote of the 1945 re-release: "The situations and dialogue of this 1930 production savour strongly of the music-hall, and though Ernie Lotinga works hard in the role of Josser the film is slow-moving and rather dated."

== See also ==
- List of films about horses
- List of films about horse racing
