= String Quartet in D major (Britten) =

String Quartet
- by Benjamin Britten
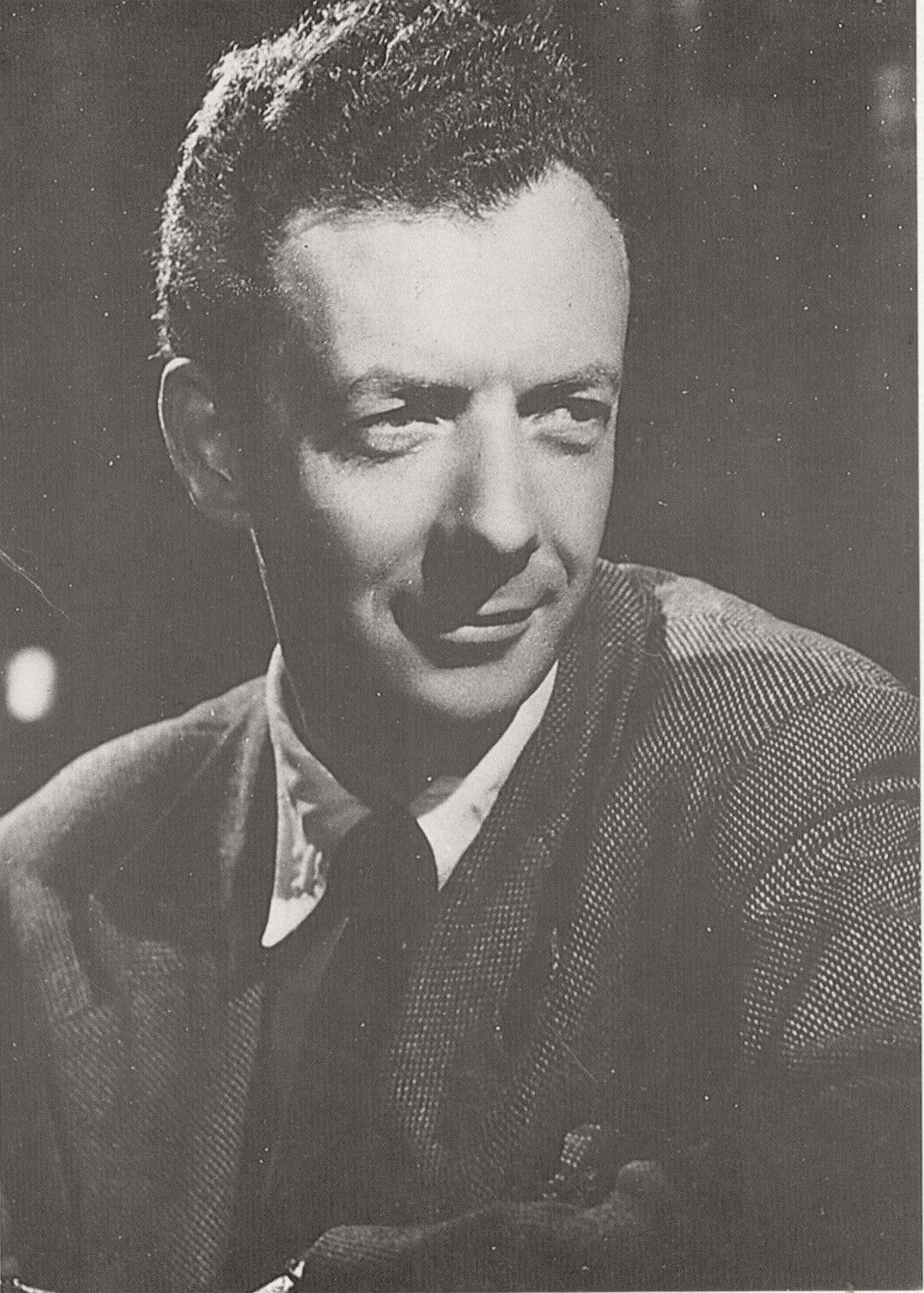
- Benjamin Britten in the 1940s
- Key: D major
- Composed: 1931
- Published: 1974
- Movements: Three

String Quartet in D major (with neither an official number or an opus number) by English composer Benjamin Britten was written in 1931. He revised it during his final illness, and it was first published in 1974.

== History ==
The quartet was completed during Britten's second year of study at the Royal College of Music. Britten showed the score to his mentor Frank Bridge, who called its counterpoint "too vocal". John Ireland, his official teacher, disagreed. It was played through privately by the Stratton Quartet in 1932. Britten was "v. pleased" with the result, "it sounds more or less as I intended it".

In 1974, the composer revised it for publication, at the urging of Donald Mitchell. The revisions seem to have been fairly small.

== Structure and analysis ==
The quartet is in three movements:

1. Allegro maestoso
2. Lento ed espressivo
3. Allegro giocoso

A complete performance takes about 19 minutes.

Musicologist Peter Evans considered it an immediate background to, and to strongly foreshadow, Britten's Sinfonietta, which was published in 1932 as his Op. 1.

== Recordings ==
- 1986 – Endellion Quartet
- 1991 – Britten Quartet, Collins Classics 11152
- 1998 – Sorrel Quartet, Chandos CHAN 9664
- 2010 – Emperor Quartet, BIS 1540
