= Side Streets (1933 film) =

- Directed by: Ivar Campbell
- Written by: Philip Godfrey
- Produced by: Norman Loudon
- Starring: Jane Wood; Diana Beaumont; Arnold Riches
- Music by: Colin Wark
- Production company: Sound City Films
- Distributed by: Metro-Goldwyn-Mayer
- Release date: March 1933
- Running time: 46 minutes
- Country: United Kingdom
- Language: English

Side Streets is a 1933 British drama film directed by Ivar Campbell. It was made as a quota quickie at Shepperton Studios. The screenplay concerns a retired boxer who saves his fiancée's mother from her blackmailing husband.

== Cast ==
- Jane Wood as Mrs. Brown
- Diana Beaumont as Nancy Brown
- Arnold Riches as Ted Swan
- Paul Neville as Mr. Brown
- Harry Terry (as unidentified character)
- Gunner Moir (as unidentified character)

== Bibliography ==
- Wood, Linda. British Films, 1927–1939. British Film Institute, 1986.
