= The Golden Cage (1933 film) =

1933 film directed by Ivar Campbell

- Theatrical release poster
- Directed by: Ivar Campbell
- Written by: D.B. Wyndham-Lewis; Pamela Frankau
- Based on: story by Lady Troubridge
- Produced by: Norman Loudon
- Starring: Anne Grey; Anthony Kimmins; Frank Cellier
- Music by: Colin Wark
- Production company: Sound City Films
- Distributed by: Metro-Goldwyn-Mayer
- Release date: March 1933
- Running time: 62 minutes
- Country: United Kingdom
- Language: English

The Golden Cage is a 1933 British drama film directed by Ivar Campbell and starring Anne Grey, Anthony Kimmins and Frank Cellier. It was written by D.B. Wyndham-Lewis and Pamela Frankau based on a story by Lady Troubridge. The film was made at Shepperton Studios as a quota quickie for distribution by MGM.

== Plot ==
A woman marries a wealthy man but is still secretly in love with a much poorer man.

== Cast ==
- Anne Grey as Venetia Doxford
- Anthony Kimmins as Paul Mortimer
- Frank Cellier as Julian Sande
- Mackenzie Ward as Claude Barrington

== Reception ==
Kine Weekly wrote: "A story of hotel life, in which the characters are unworthy of serious attention. ..The theme is artificial, and it falls to Anne Grey to relieve the tedium. Situations have been carried to length and, with a thinly veiled gramophone advertisement, require cutting. A few ambitious directorial efforts jar, and an unnecessary tour of the hotel leads to a moderate climax. Reproduction of the musical accompaniment is occasionally poor, but the fair dialogue gets over well. ... Well-furnished hotel interiors are clearly photographed, but a few badly focussed shots and a jarring, swinging shot need attention."

The Daily Film Renter wrote: "Well-mounted flashes of hotel life, with strong vein of human interest. Comedy episodes slightly prolonged, but do not interfere with development of theme. Brilliant debut of Anthony Kimmins in leading role. Smooth direction."
