= Eyes of Fate =

1933 film

- Directed by: Ivar Campbell
- Written by: Holloway Horn
- Produced by: Norman Loudon
- Starring: Allan Jeayes; Valerie Hobson; Terence De Marney
- Music by: Colin Wark
- Production company: Sound City Films
- Distributed by: Universal Pictures
- Release date: December 1933
- Running time: 67 minutes
- Country: United Kingdom
- Language: English

Eyes of Fate is a 1933 British sports fantasy film directed by Ivar Campbell and starring Allan Jeayes, Valerie Hobson and Terence De Marney. It is a quota quickie, made at Shepperton Studios. It is also known by the alternative title of All the Winners.

A bookmaker seems to have struck it lucky when he comes across a newspaper containing the next day's horse racing results, but the paper also contains some more unsettling news.

== Cast ==
- Allan Jeayes as Knocker
- Valerie Hobson as Rene
- Terence De Marney as Edgar
- Faith Bennett as Betty
- Nellie Bowman as Mrs. Knocker
- O. B. Clarence as Mr. Oliver
- Tony Halfpenny as George
- Edwin Ellis as Jefferson
- Edmund Cozens
- John Herring
- David Niven as Man at Race Course
- Hugh Rene

== See also ==
- List of films about horses
- List of films about horse racing

== Bibliography ==
- Wood, Linda. British Films, 1927–1939. British Film Institute, 1986.
