= Radio Pirates =

1935 film directed by Ivar Campbell

- Directed by: Ivar Campbell
- Written by: Donovan Pedelty
- Produced by: Norman Loudon
- Starring: Leslie French; Mary Lawson; Enid Stamp-Taylor
- Music by: Donovan Pedelty
- Production company: Sound City Films
- Distributed by: Associated Producers & Distributors
- Release date: March 1935
- Running time: 89 minutes
- Country: United Kingdom
- Language: English

Radio Pirates, also known as Big Ben Calling, is a 1935 British musical film directed by Ivar Campbell and starring Leslie French, Mary Lawson and Enid Stamp-Taylor. It was written by Donovan Pedelty, with music and lyrics by Mark Lubbock, and made at Shepperton Studios.

== Plot ==
To save themselves from financial ruin, the owner of a radio shop and his friends start a pirate radio station. The police pursue them and they end up in the tower of Big Ben.

== Cast ==
- Leslie French as Leslie
- Mary Lawson as Mary
- Willie Jenkins as Billy Brooks
- Enid Stamp-Taylor
- Hughie Green
- Kenneth Kove
- Roy Fox and his band as themselves
- Teddy Brown
- Edgar Driver (uncredited)
- Frederick Lloyd (uncredited)
- John Turnbull (uncredited)
- Fanny Wright (uncredited)
- Sally Gray (uncredited)

== Reception ==
Kine Weekly wrote: "Happy, friendly radio musical romance, a trifle loose in construction but admirably presented and richer in ideas and ingenuity than many of its successful predecessors."

Picturegoer wrote: "Net a very well constructed story, but one which has some ingenuity of idea, bright gags, and good 'turns' ... Hughie Green gives some exceedingly clever imitations, and both Roy Fox and his Band and Teddy Brown are in excellent form. Farcical situations are well nandled and cabaret settings lavish."
