= Colonel Blood (film) =

1934 British film by W. P. Lipscomb

- Directed by: W. P. Lipscomb
- Written by: W. P. Lipscomb
- Produced by: Norman Loudon
- Starring: Frank Cellier; Anne Grey; Mary Lawson; Allan Jeayes; Arthur Chesney
- Cinematography: George Stretton
- Music by: Colin Wark; Charles Cowlrick
- Production company: Sound City Films
- Distributed by: Metro-Goldwyn-Mayer
- Release date: January 1934
- Running time: 98 minutes
- Country: United Kingdom
- Language: English

Colonel Blood is a 1934 British historical adventure film written and directed by W. P. Lipscomb and starring Frank Cellier, Anne Grey and Mary Lawson.

== Plot ==
The plot is based on a dramatised account of the exploits of the historical renegade, Thomas Blood, in the Seventeenth Century and his attempted theft of the English Crown Jewels.

== Production ==
The film was shot on location at Shepperton Studios near London. The film's sets were designed by the art directors John Bryan and Laurence Irving, while costumes were designed by Elizabeth Haffenden. It was shot on 35mm black and white film in an aspect ratio of 1.37:1. It was produced by Norman Loudon for Sound City Film, Shepperton Studio's in-house sound production company.

== Cast ==
- Frank Cellier as Col. Blood
- Anne Grey as Lady Castlemaine
- Mary Lawson as Susie
- Allan Jeayes as Charles II
- Hay Petrie as Mr. Edwards
- Hilda Trevelyan as Mrs. Edwards
- Arthur Chesney as Samuel Pepys
- Stella Arbenina as Mrs. Pepys
- Desmond Jeans as Parrot
- Robert Nainby as Desborough
- Arthur Goullet as Tim
- Percy Standing as Duke of Ormonde
- Ena Grossmith as Jane
- Gabriel Toyne as Ossory
- Peggy Evans as Nancy
- E. Vivian Reynolds as Arlington
- Tarva Penna as Chiffinch

== Bibliography ==
- Klossner, Michael. The Europe of 1500-1815 on Film and Television: A Worldwide Filmography of Over 2550 Works, 1895 Through 2000. McFarland & Company, 2002.
- Low, Rachael. Filmmaking in 1930s Britain. George Allen & Unwin, 1985.
- Scott, Ian. From Pinewood to Hollywood: British Filmmakers in American Cinema, 1910-1969. Palgrave MacMillan, 2010.
- Wood, Linda. British Films, 1927-1939. British Film Institute, 1986.
