= Youthful Folly =

- Directed by: Miles Mander
- Written by: Heinrich Fraenkel
- Based on: The Expensive Halo; 1931 play by Josephine Tey
- Produced by: Norman Loudon
- Starring: Irene Vanbrugh; Jane Carr; Mary Lawson; Arthur Chesney
- Production company: Sound City Films
- Distributed by: Columbia Pictures
- Release date: December 1934
- Running time: 74 minutes
- Country: United Kingdom
- Language: English

Youthful Folly is a 1934 British drama film directed by Miles Mander and starring Irene Vanbrugh, Jane Carr and Mary Lawson. It was written by Heinrich Fraenkel based on the 1931 playThe Expensive Halo by Josephine Tey, and was a quota quickie made at Shepperton Studios for release by Columbia Pictures. It portrays the love lives of the son of daughter of an aristocratic lady.

It is also known by the alternative title Intermezzo.

== Cast ==
- Irene Vanbrugh as Lady Wilmington
- Jane Carr as Ursula Wilmington
- Mary Lawson as Susan Grierson
- Grey Blake as Larry Wilmington
- Arthur Chesney as Lord Wilmington
- Eric Maturin as Tim Gierson
- Fanny Wright as Mrs. Grierson
- Betty Ann Davies
- Merle Tottenham
- Belle Chrystall
- Kenneth Kove

== Reception ==
Kine Weekly wrote: "This picture sets out to prove that Belgravia and Balham won't mix, but it fails to illustrate its argument convincingly, and neglects to provide even passable entertainment. The acting, with few exceptions, is weak, and the direction is destitute of imagination. The film is all talk and feeble talk at that. A poor quota proposition. ... Jane Carr is good as Ursula, she deserves a better break, for she is both intelligent and attractive. The same cannot be said for the supporting players. Grey Blake looks like an overgrown school boy, and reveals lack of experience as Garry, and Mary lawson is uninteresting as Sara. Irene Vanbrugh and Arthur Chesney are also in the cast, but these two fine players are wasted. This film, which is nothing but a tedious vocal commentary on life in the suburbs and society, goes a long way round to explore the obvious. Few of the characters interest, and none invites the slightest sympathy."

The Daily Film Renter wrote: "Banal dialogue, familiar situations, uninspired direction, and uninteresting backgrounds make this a dull affair, most of the entertainment being forthcoming from the performance of Irene Vanbrugh as Ursula's feather-brained mother, Lady Wilmington. Jane Carr does her best with the incredible role of Ursula, but never manages to make it convincing, while Mary Lawson is similarly handicapped by the part of Sara. Grey Blake has the thankless task of infusing life into the violinist hero."
