= By-pass to Happiness =

1934 film directed by Anthony Kimmins

- Maurice Evans and Tamara Desni in a publicity still for the film (Picturegoer, 28 July 1934)
- Directed by: Anthony Kimmins
- Written by: Anthony Kimmins
- Produced by: Ivar Campbell
- Starring: Tamara Desni; Maurice Evans; Kay Hammond
- Cinematography: Hone Glendinning
- Music by: Colin Wark
- Production company: Sound City Films
- Distributed by: Fox Film
- Release date: 30 July 1934
- Running time: 74 minutes
- Country: United Kingdom
- Language: English

By-pass to Happiness (also known as By Pass to Happiness) is a 1934 British romantic comedy film directed and written by Anthony Kimmins and starring Tamara Desni, Maurice Evans and Kay Hammond. It was shot at Shepperton Studios near London and distributed by Fox Film.

== Plot ==
Ex-airman Robin Fancour and his mechanic Wallop invest all their savings in a run-down old garage, in the hope that a nearby proposed by-pass road will bring them customers. Robin falls for Society girl Tamara, but is frustrated by his lowly position and lack of cash. Then his luck changes. He unexpectedly inherits a valuable statue, which he sells to plough the money into the garage, the by-pass is built, and Tamara agrees to marry him.

== Cast ==
- Tamara Desni as Tamara
- Maurice Evans as Robin Fancour
- Kay Hammond as Dinah
- Mark Daly as Wallop
- Eliot Makeham as Miller
- Nellie Bowman as Jane
- John Teed as Stephen
- Billy Holland as Jim

== Reception ==
Kine Weekly wrote: "Romantic comedy up to date in theme and presentation, but thin in story values. Fancy and fact do not blend too satisfactorily, and the development is protracted. Still, the film's simple humour and pretty sentiment are dispensed with an ingenuousness which makes for harmless entertainment. ... Tamara Desni is very weak as the heroine. Her acting is lifeless, and her speech does not record clearly. Maurice Evans, however, is good as Robin, and Mark Daly contributes an amusing character study as Wallop."

The Daily Film Renter wrote: "Anthony Kimmins wrote and directed this acceptable story of romance among the petrol cans. He has evolved a show which fulfils most of the requirements, far-fetched and otherwise, of standard romance, and the result is neat in its essential places, even if, sometimes, the development is a trifle slow."
