= Rolling Home (1935 film) =

- Trade show advertisement
- Directed by: Ralph Ince
- Written by: Marriott Edgar; Will Fyffe; Frank Launder
- Produced by: Norman Loudon
- Starring: Will Fyffe; Molly Lamont; Ralph Ince
- Cinematography: Hone Glendinning; George Stretton
- Edited by: Rose Gardener
- Music by: Colin Wark
- Production company: Sound City Films
- Distributed by: Associated Producers and Distributors
- Release date: 9 December 1935
- Running time: 68 minutes
- Country: United Kingdom
- Language: English

Rolling Home is a 1935 British comedy film directed by Ralph Ince and starring Will Fyffe, Ince and Molly Lamont. It was written by Frank Launder from a story by Marriott Edgar and Fyffe and was made at Shepperton Studios.

== Plot ==
MacGregor and his chum Wally stow away on a luxury yacht. They discover that the first mate is trying to smuggle his crooked brother into England, and manage to thwart the situation.

== Cast ==
- Will Fyffe as John McGregor
- Ralph Ince as Wally
- Molly Lamont as Ann
- Ruth Maitland as Mrs. Murray
- Jock McKay as Jock
- Margaret Moffat as Mrs. McGregor
- James Raglan as Captain Pengelly
- Harold Saxon-Snell as Callaghan

== Reception ==
The Monthly Film Bulletin wrote: "The story is a poor one, and its presentation is sadly lacking in continuity. The attempts to portray a Scottish village and convey local colour are ludicrous. There is little regard for the need for correct detail, and the producers have committed several crude blunders. The supporting cast is poor, and in a mediocre piece of screenwork Will Fyffe is the one redeeming feature."

The Daily Film Renter wrote: "Amusing blend of Scottish comedy and nautical melodrama, with cannibal island dream interlude which will please many audiences. Appeal is built around the bibulous personality of Will Fyffe, who is outstanding. Plot contains steady flow of laughs, some thrills and two or amusing surprise twists. Typical Fyffe songs interpolated, but never long enough to retard action. Support is adequate, and facile direction ensures maintenance of interest."

Kine Weekly wrote: "Admirers of the popular Scots comedian will find that Will Fyffe is thoroughly at home on the screen and that his portrayal of a convivial sailor is convincing and thoroughly satisfying. It is his characterisation that th picture relies on; the story itself is a mixed effort.
