= The Wishbone =

- Directed by: Arthur Maude
- Written by: N.W. Baring-Pemberton; William Townend (story)
- Produced by: Ivar Campbell
- Starring: Nellie Wallace; Davy Burnaby; A. Bromley Davenport
- Music by: Colin Wark
- Production company: Sound City Films
- Distributed by: MGM
- Release date: March 1933
- Running time: 78 minutes
- Country: United Kingdom
- Language: English

The Wishbone is a 1933 British comedy film directed by Arthur Maude and starring Nellie Wallace, Davy Burnaby and A. Bromley Davenport. It was written by N.W. Baring-Pemberton and William Townend. It was made at Shepperton Studios as a quota quickie for release by MGM.

== Preservation status ==
The British Film Institute National Archive holds a collection of stills but no film or video materials.

== Premise ==
After she inherits fifty pounds, an old lady decides to spend it on a spree.

== Cast ==
- Nellie Wallace as Mrs Beasley
- Davy Burnaby as Peters
- A. Bromley Davenport as Harry Stammer
- Jane Wood as Mrs. Stammer
- Renée Macready as Grace Elliott
- Geoffrey King as Fred Elliott
- Fred Schwartz as jeweler
- Hugh Lethbridge as Lord Westland

== Reception ==
Film Weekly wrote: "Nellie Wallace makes her debut in a film which is suitaably eccentric but hardly worthy her undoubted abilities. Fun for her music-hall admirers is not toowell mixed with sentiment and romance, and the result is very mild entertainment. Given a better 'vehicle,' this might have been a notable first attempt for one of the most popular British comediennes, but, unfortunately, the story is feeble and not at all well told. ...The comedy, notably maintained by the star and supported by Davy Burnaby and Bromley Davenport, is entertaining in places. The attempts at drama, on the other hand, are not merely poor but actually interfere with the film's main purpose."

Kine Weekly wrote: "Comedy Drama with a simple, fragmentary story designed to exploit the versatility of the star, who not only introduces her popular songs, dances and patter, but finds time to ramble in the by-ways of tender emotionalism. The star, however, is ill-served by the matter and the producer, and receives little serious help from the supporting players."s
