= Lest We Forget (1934 film) =

1934 film directed by John Baxter

- Trade advertisement from The Daily Film Renter (21 November 1934)
- Directed by: John Baxter
- Written by: Herbert Ayres
- Produced by: Norman Loudon
- Starring: Stewart Rome; George Carney; Esmond Knight
- Cinematography: George Stretton
- Music by: Colin Wark
- Production company: Sound City Films
- Distributed by: Metro-Goldwyn-Mayer
- Release date: August 1934
- Running time: 60 minutes
- Country: United Kingdom
- Language: English

Lest We Forget is a 1934 British drama film directed by John Baxter and starring Stewart Rome, George Carney and Esmond Knight. It was written by Herbert Ayers, and was made as a quota quickie at Shepperton Studios.

== Preservation status ==
The British Film Institute National Archive holds a collection of stills but no film or video materials.

== Plot ==
Captain Rayner, along with his comrades Jock, Pat, and Taffy, survive a shared shellhole during the war and vow to reunite fifteen years later. When the date arrives, Jock and Taffy visit Rayner’s magnificent estate, while the late Pat is represented by his son. At the reunion party, a romance blossoms between Pat's son and Rayner’s daughter Sylvia. The evening concludes with a surprising revelation: Rayner is actually as hard-up as his former subordinates and borrowed the mansion to maintain his prestigious image and keep his promise to the group.

== Cast ==
- Stewart Rome as Captain Rayner
- George Carney as Sergeant Jock
- Esmond Knight as Pat Doyle Jr.
- Ann Yates as Sylvia Rayner
- Roddy Hughes as Taffy
- Tony Quinn as Pat Doyle
- Wilson Coleman as butler

== Reception ==
Kine Weekly wrote: "Patriotic drama, a simple essay in comradeship and loyalty, approached from the popular angle. ... Stewart Rome is a trifle heavy-handed as Rayner, but probably lives up to the conception of an officer and a gentleman, George Carney and Roddy Hughes are both good as Jock and Taffy respectively, but Esmond Knight and Anne Yates fail to make much of the love interest."

The Daily Film Renter wrote: "Naive little story of group of wartime comrades who keep pledge to meet again after fifteen years. Unpretentious in dramatic or acting values, picture is imbued with simple sentiment and humour and is just an unpretending quota effort with a certain 'old soldier' appeal which should suit as second feature in modest provincial halls."
