= Designing Women (1934 film) =

1934 British film by Ivar Campbell

- Tyrell Davis, Stewart Rome and Kathleen Kelly in the film
- Directed by: Ivar Campbell
- Written by: N.W. Baring-Pemberton; George Robinson
- Produced by: Norman Loudon
- Starring: Stewart Rome; Valerie Taylor; Tyrell Davis
- Production company: Sound City
- Distributed by: Metro-Goldwyn-Mayer
- Release date: March 1934
- Running time: 71 minutes
- Country: United Kingdom
- Language: English

Designing Women (also known as House of Cards) is a 1934 British drama film directed by Ivar Campbell and starring Stewart Rome, Valerie Taylor and Tyrell Davis. It was written by N.W. Baring-Pemberton and George Robinson, and shot at Shepperton Studios.

== Plot ==
After Diana marries Alan Dent, an ex-officer who then drinks himself to death, she resolves to secure her financial independence. Primed with insider information, she purchases a plot of land at a bargain price and launches a house agency under the slogan "Houses for women, designed by women." Together with her business partner Molly, Diana fights to establish the venture and ultimately makes a fortune. When Molly decides to marry, Diana buys out her share of the firm to run the business alone. Her life changes when Travers, an old admirer, is injured in a smash-and-grab raid. Abandoning a lucrative contract, Diana rushes to his hospital bedside. Realising where her heart truly lies, she decides to abandon her hard-won career in exchange for love.

== Cast ==
- Stewart Rome as Travers
- Valerie Taylor as Diana Dent
- Tyrell Davis as Hildebrand Way
- D. A. Clarke-Smith as Bowsfield
- Cyril Gardiner as Alan Dent
- Kathleen Kelly as Molly
- Edgar Driver as Green

== Reception ==
The Daily Film Renter wrote: "Taken all round, it is an ingenuous affair. Settings are artistically devised, while photography and presentation are quite good. Direction is adequate, Valerie Taylor plays Diana, achieving a fair amount of conviction, Kathleen Kelly making a likeable Molly. Stewart Rome is inclined to overdo his role of Travers. Tyrell Davis, as a milksop architect who marries Molly, supplies amusing comedy support."

Kine Weekly wrote: "Story of love versus a career, which has quite a good idea behind it, but treated in too leisurely a fashion and none too convincingly developed. Acting values are only moderate, but technical work is sound. It should prove useful for quota purposes and provide moderate general entertainment."

Picturegoer wrote: "[Valerie Taylor] appears rather stilted and artificial, although at times she enlists sympathy and you can feel her enthusiasm for complete emancipation. Stewart Rome has few opportunities as the man for whom she sacrifices her career, but he is sincere and natural. ... Kathleen Kelly is attractive asa young girl who joins the elder woman in her housing plans, but later deserts her for a lover. This latter role is played in an irritatingly 'silly ass' manner by Trrell Davis. The plot unfolds very slowy and there is not a great deal of dramatic force in the depiction of the heroine's unhappy married life; the sequences which depict her life as a successful building contractor, however, are more interesting and contain humour with a strongly human vein in it."
