= How's Chances? (1934 film) =

1934 British film by Anthony Kimmins

The Diplomatic Lover
- U.S. theatrical release poster
- Directed by: Anthony Kimmins
- Written by: Curt J. Braun (play); Bobby E. Lüthge (play); Ivar Campbell; Harry Graham
- Produced by: Norman Loudon
- Starring: Harold French; Tamara Desni; Davy Burnaby
- Music by: Hans May
- Production company: Sound City Films
- Distributed by: Fox Film Company
- Release date: 17 September 1934
- Running time: 73 minutes
- Country: United Kingdom
- Language: English

How's Chances? (re-released in re-edited form in 1938 as Diplomatic Lover / The Bedroom Diplomat) is a 1934 British musical romance film directed by Anthony Kimmins and starring Harold French, Tamara Desni and Davy Burnaby. It was written by Ivar Campbell and Harry Graham, adapted from the 1932 play Der Frauendiplomat by Curt J. Braun and Bobby E. Lüthge. The film was made at Shepperton Studios as a quota quickie for release by Fox Film.

== Preservation status ==
The British Film Institute National Archive holds the original 1934 release, but not the 1938 re-issue.

== Plot ==
A young ambitious British diplomat goes to take up his post in an embassy abroad.

== Cast ==
- Harold French as Nottingham
- Tamara Desni as Helen
- Davy Burnaby as Michelo
- Morton Selten as Sir Charles
- Reginald Gardiner as Dersingham
- Carol Rees as Dolores
- Peggy Novak as Olga
- Percy Walsh as Castellano
- Andreas Malandrinos as Machulla Ahab

== Reception ==
=== Original 1934 release ===
The Daily Film Renter wrote: "Brightly presented, embellished with occasional songs, and excellently photographed, film holds interest throughout, although more might have been made of theme. Song numbers are catchy, the best of them being well rendered by Tamara Desni. "

=== 1938 re-release ===
The Monthly Film Bulletin wrote: "The film is slow in places, but the photography is good, and there are some novel and amusing incidents. The acting is good on the whole."

== See also ==
- The Ladies Diplomat (1932)
