= Reunion (1932 film) =

1932 film directed by Ivar Campbell

- Stewart Rome in the film
- Directed by: Ivar Campbell
- Screenplay by: Herbert Ayres; Reginald Hargreaves
- Produced by: Norman Loudon
- Starring: Stewart Rome; Anthony Holles; Robert Dudley
- Production company: Sound City
- Release date: 1932
- Running time: 60 minutes
- Country: United Kingdom
- Language: English

Reunion is a 1932 British drama film directed by Ivar Campbell and starring Stewart Rome, Anthony Holles and Fred Schwartz. It was written by Herbert Ayres and Reginald Hargreaves, and was a quota quickie made at Shepperton Studios for release by the American studio MGM.

== Premise ==
After twelve years of a hopeless struggle to make his chicken farm profitable, Major Tancred is invited as the guest of honour to a reunion dinner hosted by men from his old regiment. To attend, he has to redeem his dress suit from pawn, leaving him with just £1 in his pocket after buying a one-way ticket. At the conclusion of the dinner, the padre calls for a collection to help an ex-corporal, and the major parts with his last pound. On his long walk home, he finds comfort and encouragement by recalling the final words of his own speech, given in response to a toast: "A man is never deserted until he deserts himself."

== Cast ==
- Stewart Rome as Major Tancred
- Anthony Holles as Padre
- Fred Schwartz as pawnbroker
- Robert Dudley as Sgt. Dudley
- Eric Pavitt as the little boy
- George Bishop as the Jews harp player
- Kit Keen as the bones player
- Bob Wilkins as the tin whistle player
- Harry Blue
- Noel Dainton
- Bernard Dudley
- Roddy Hughes
- Terry Irvine
- John Lalette
- Randolph McLeod
- Leonard Morris
- Robert Newton
- James Prior
- Philip Ritti
- James Stadden
- Gerald Steyn
- Harry Terry
- Colin Wark
- Freddie Watts

== Reception ==
Film Weekly wrote: "There is no more material in this than a sketch or a one-act play. There is none of the normal ingredients of appeal (love interest, for instance, is nil) and the whole thing is never convincing enough to be really moving."

Kine Weekly wrote: "A touching human drama based on a real-life story – published in John Bull – of a war-time major who spends his last penny in attending a reunion dinner. Atmosphere, acting and production are all praiseworthy. ... Stewart Rome gives a sensitive and natural performance as the major, and will readily win sympathy. ... Ivar Campbell is to be congratulated on a simple and sincere treatment of a story which might easily have more than one countrpart in real life."

Picturegoer wrote: "It has the imprint of sincerity and truth, holding a mirror to a generation whose misfortunes are now glossed over by other interests, their sacrifices forgotten. Stewart Rome's performance is excellent, while all the varying types that go to make up a regimental unit are splendidly presented by a wholly competent male cast."

Picture Show wrote: "A moving film ... There is practically no story to speak of, but it is treated with dignity and restraint."
