= Presdales School =

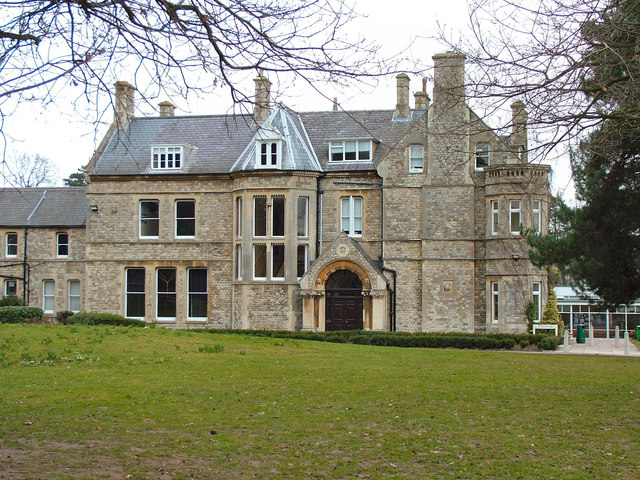
- Presdales School in 2006

Location
- Hoe Lane; Ware, Hertfordshire, SG12 9NX; England; 51°48′11″N 0°01′51″W

Information
- Type: Academy
- Motto: Achievement For All
- Established: 1906
- Department for Education URN: 137985 Tables
- Ofsted: Reports
- Headmaster: M Warren
- Gender: Girls
- Age: 11 to 19
- Enrolment: 1065
- Former name: Ware Grammar School for Girls
- Website: http://www.presdales.herts.sch.uk

Presdales School is a girls' secondary school with academy status, located in Ware, Hertfordshire in the East of England. The school also operates a coeducational sixth form. The current headmaster is M Warren, who took the post in 2016.

== History ==
It was founded as Ware Grammar School for girls in 1906 at nearby Amwell House, and moved to its present site of Presdales House in 1964. It became a comprehensive in 1975.

It was awarded specialist college status three times by the Secretary of State for Education and Skills, namely as: a Language College, in 1995; an English and Music College, in 2003; and as a Mathematics & Computing College, in 2009. The school converted to academy status in April 2012.

Presdales made the news in December 2020 when its plan to switch to remote learning for the last week of the autumn term was thwarted by Schools Minister, Nick Gibb, who threatened to use legal powers to make the school stay open. The intention had been to keep staff and students isolated and safe from the ongoing coronavirus pandemic ahead of Christmas.

== Notable former pupils ==
- Kacey Ainsworth, actress who played Little Mo Mitchell from 2000-06 in EastEnders
- Nicola Fibbens, Olympic swimmer, who competed in the 1984 Summer Olympics
- Hannah Fry, mathematician and broadcaster
- Bianca Gascoigne, British glamour model and television personality
- Grace Harvey, British Paralympic swimmer who won gold in the 2024 Paris Paralympic Games in SB5 100m Breaststroke

=== Ware Grammar School for Girls ===
- Tessa Blackstone, Baroness Blackstone
- Ann Dummett (née Chesney), Director from 1984-87 of the Runnymede Trust
- Kim Wilde, singer and DJ
