= Les Autelets =

Geological formation

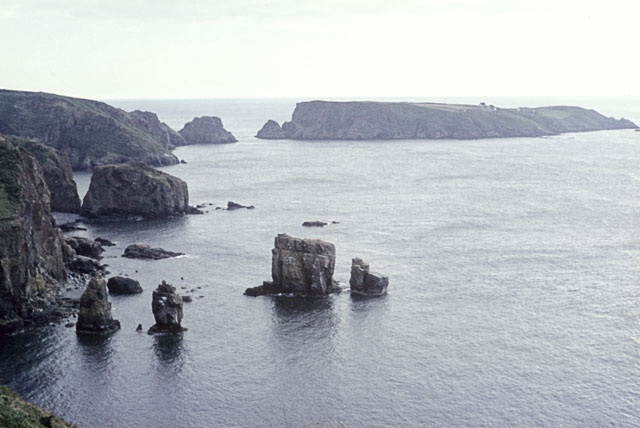
- Les Autelets stacks seen from the cliffs of Port du Moulin with Brecqhou in the background

Highest point
- Coordinates: 49°26′27″N 02°22′09″W

Naming
- English translation: The Altars
- Language of name: French

Geography
- Location: Sark, Channel Islands
- Country: Bailiwick of Guernsey

Geology
- Formed by: Coastal erosion
- Orogeny: Cadomian Orogeny
- Rock age: Precambrian (c. 600 Ma)
- Mountain type: Sea stack
- Rock type(s): Gneiss and Granite

Les Autelets (Old Norman: "The Altars") are a series of four sea stacks located on the north-western coast of Sark in the Channel Islands. The quartet of stacks have played a significant role in 19th-century maritime literature and art.

Les Autelets are known for their association with the French author Victor Hugo, who visited Sark during his exile on Guernsey. The stacks served as the inspiration for the twin Douvres in his 1866 novel Les Travailleurs de la Mer (Toilers of the Sea).

== Formation and geology ==
Les Autelets are composed of igneous rocks that form the Armorican Massif. The bedrock consists of biotite gneiss and granitic gneiss, some of the oldest rocks in the Channel Islands, which date back 2 billion years to the Paleoproterozoic era.

To form the stacks in their current state, waves gradually eroded along the joints and bedding planes to create caves. These eventually eroded right through to create arches, which subsequently collapsed to form Les Autelets.

== History ==
The stacks were first recorded in the 6th-century by a monastic community founded by Saint Magloire. It is thought that the monks viewed the rocks as natural altars, or that a hermitage was once on the opposite headland with a direct view of the stacks, and hence they named the stacks "The Altars". Early geological studies by John MacCulloch in 1811 began documenting Sark's coastline, and by the late 1800s the stacks began to appear in popular travelogues like Round the Coast (1895).

== In popular culture ==
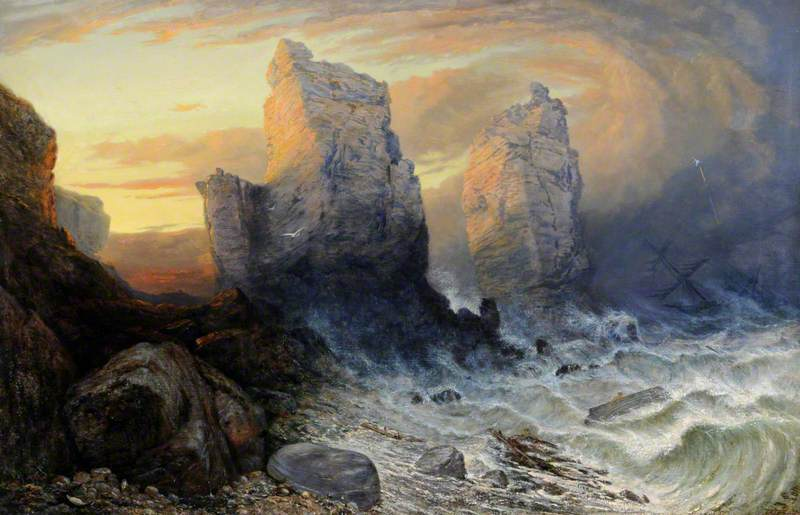
Les Autelets stacks as portrayed by Frederick Tuttley Lott.

During Victor Hugo's exile on Guernsey (1855–1870) Hugo commonly visited Sark. In his 1866 novel Les Travailleurs de la Mer (Toilers of the Sea) Hugo modelled the "twin Douvres" rocks after Les Autelets. A nearby cave now called Hugo's Cave is also cited as the place Hugo witnessed a large octopus pursue his son Charles in 1857. This inspired the battle between the protagonist Gilliatt and a giant octopus in the novel.

The stacks have been featured in many works of art; Notably, Charles Temple Dix portrayed the stacks in his 1867 oil painting Les Autelets, Sark and Frederick Tulley Lott portrayed the stacks in his painting of the same name. Additionally, artists Henry Bowser Wimbush and William Arthur Toplis have featured the stacks in their art; the latter remained on Sark for 60 years as he was captivated by the island's coastline.

== Gallery ==
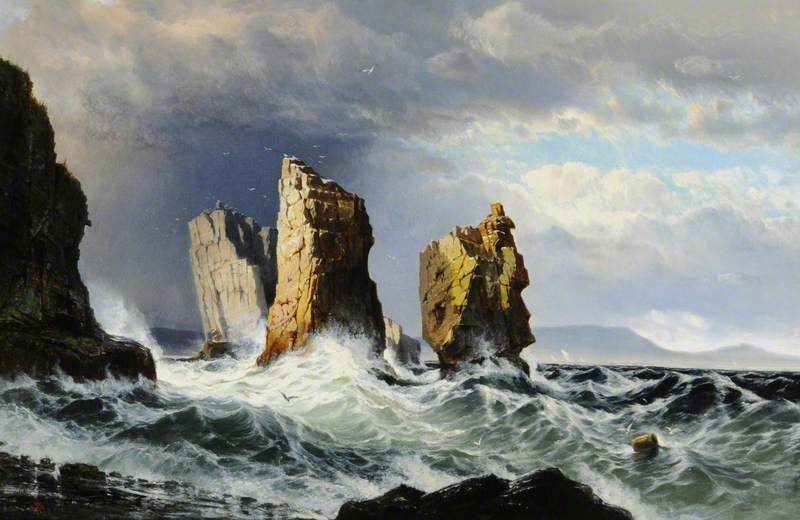
Les Autelets as portrayed by Charles Temple Dix, 1867

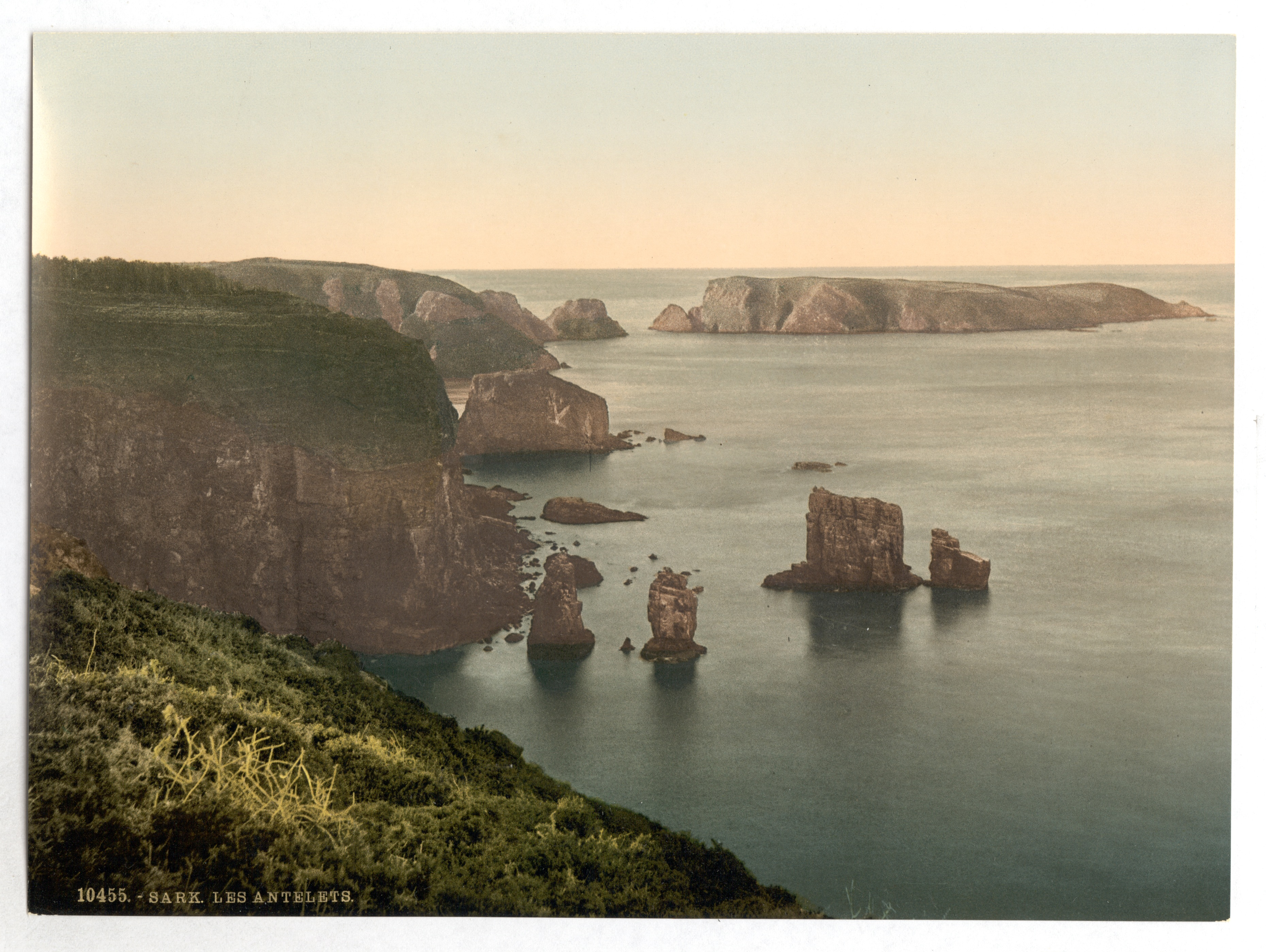
The stacks with Brecqhou in the background.

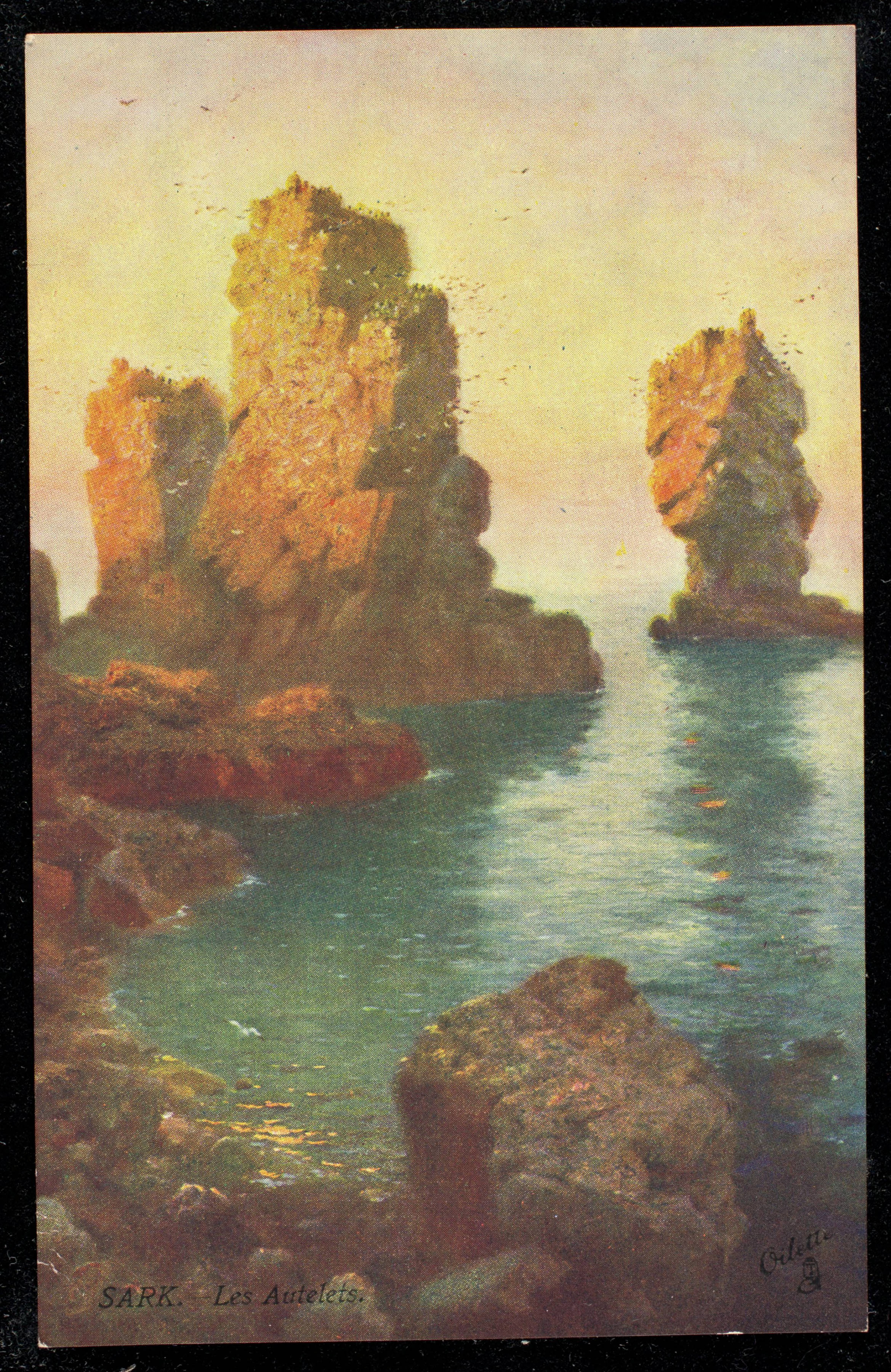
The stacks portrayed by an unknown artist, 1903

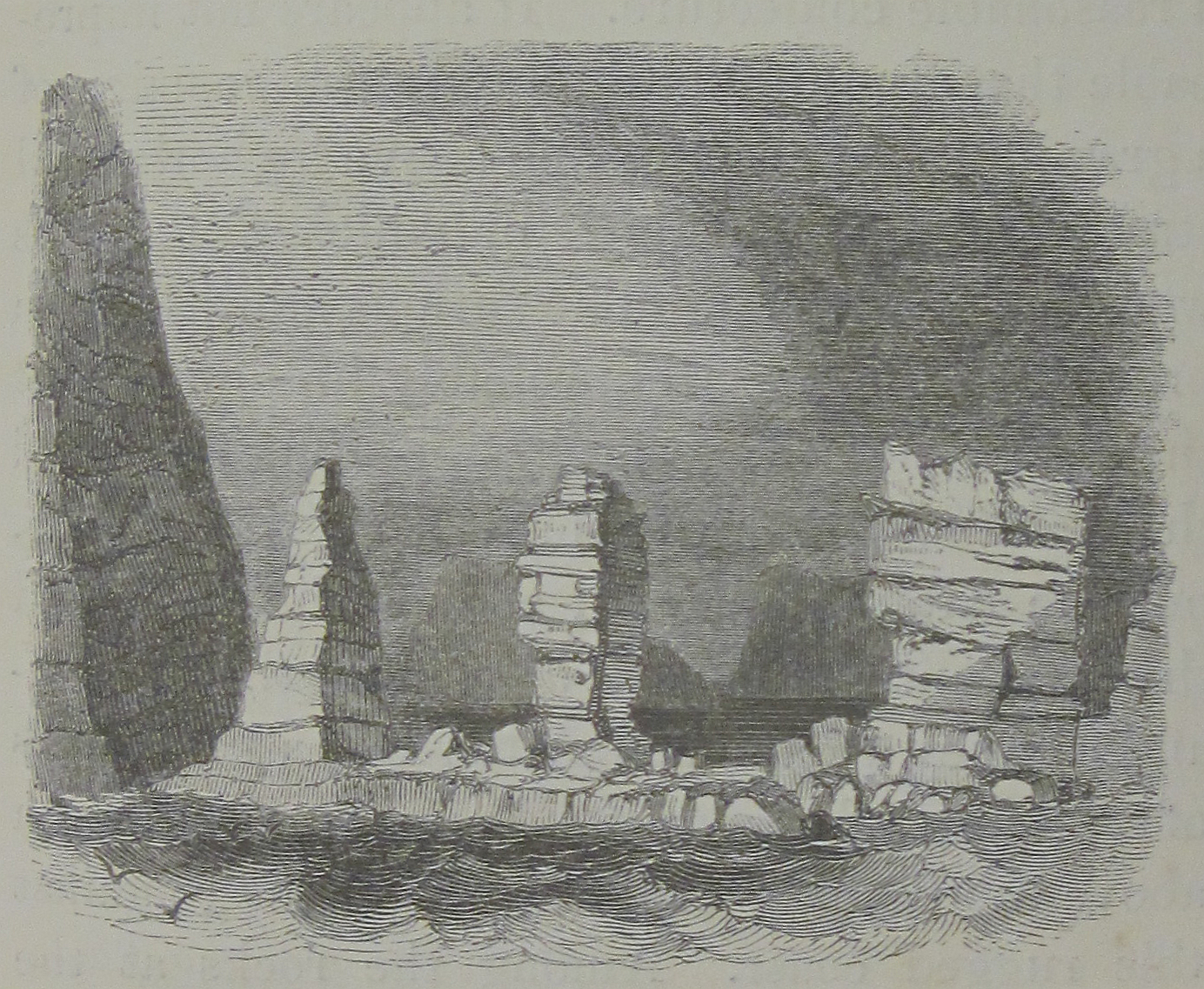
Les Autelets portrayed by naturalist Jean Louis Armand, c.1860

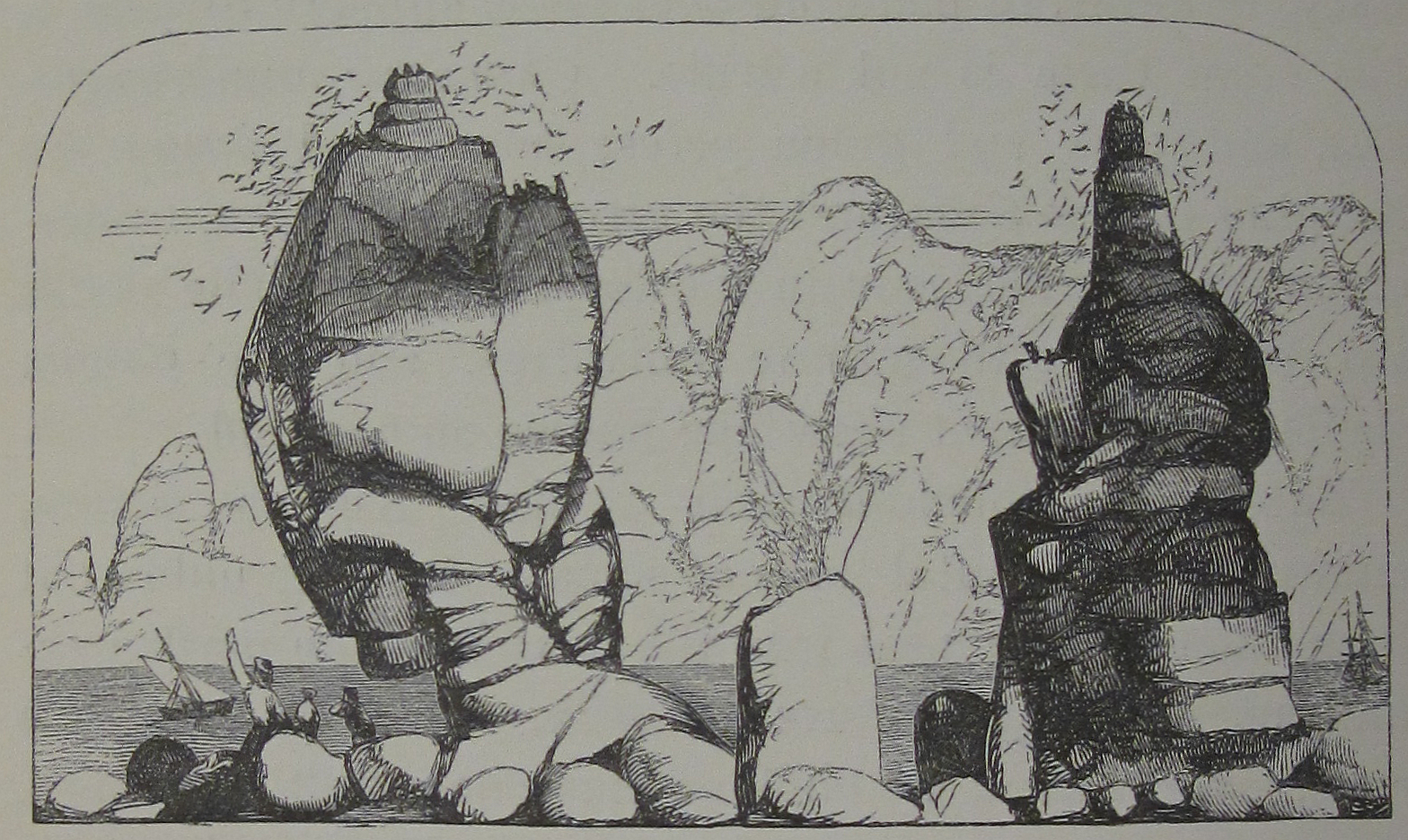
''The Islets of the Channel'', 1858, Walter Cooper Dendy, portraying Les Autelets.
