= John Wood (actor, born 1909) =

Australian actor (1909–1965)

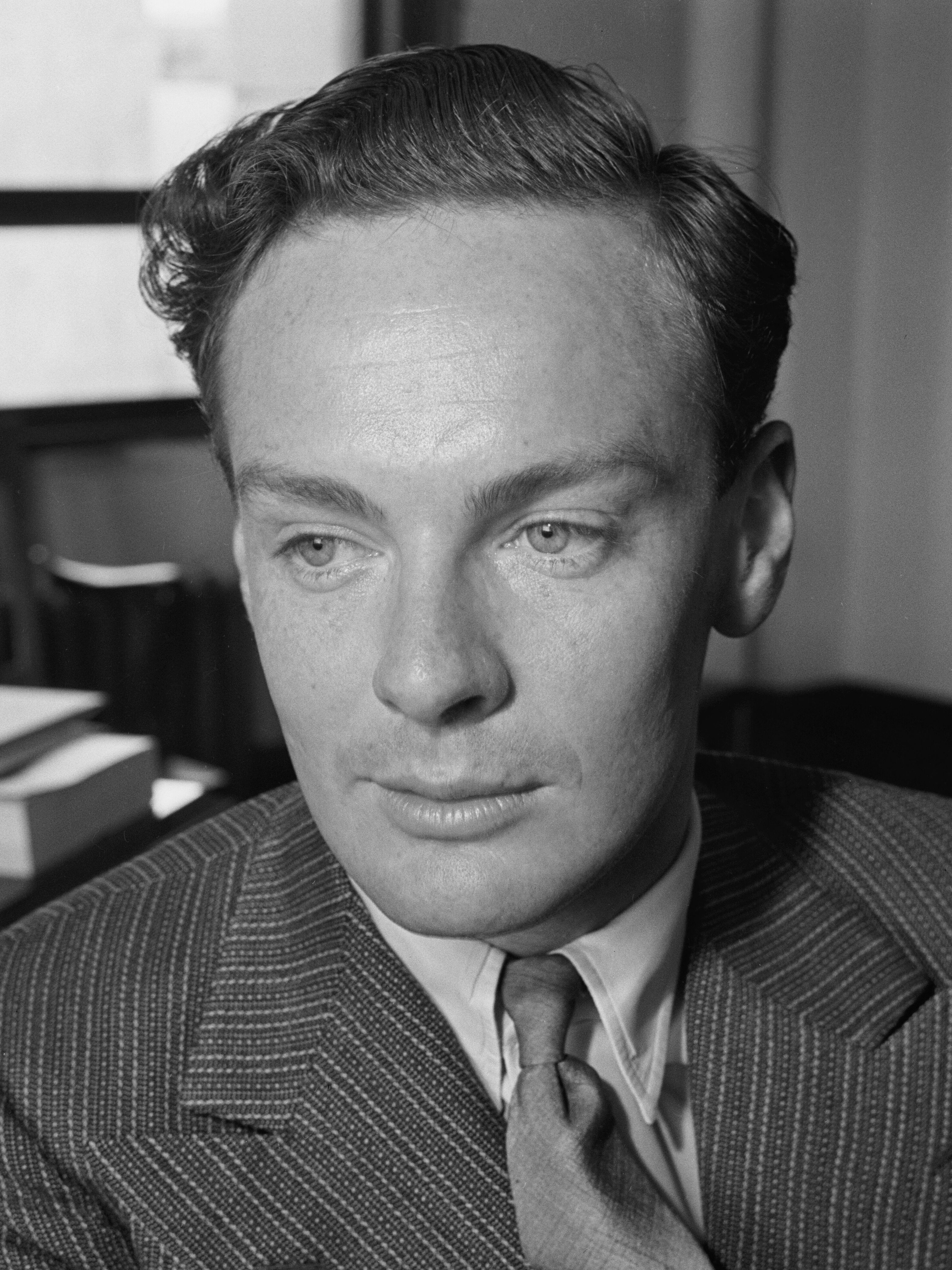
- Wood in 1935
- Born: 11 November 1909; Forbes, New South Wales, Australia
- Died: 1 March 1965 (aged 55); Kirribilli, New South Wales, Australia
- Years active: 1928–1950s

John Wood (11 November 1909 – 1 March 1965) was an Australian who acted on the stage and briefly became a film star in Hollywood and Britain in the late 1930s.

== Early acting career ==
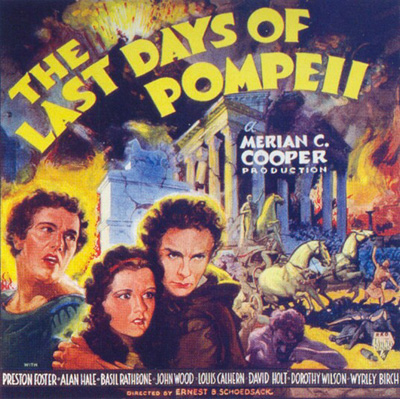
Preston Foster, Dorothy Wilson and John Wood featured prominently in advertising for The Last Days of Pompeii

Wood was born in Forbes, New South Wales and attended Sydney Church of England Grammar School. After briefly venturing into operating a banana plantation he turned to acting. He performed on stage for the J. C. Williamson Company in Australia between 1929 and 1933, earning good reviews as a "talented juvenile" and handsome young actor "with promise."

== Stage and screen work in London and Hollywood ==
By early 1934 he had established himself in London, cast soon after arrival in the lead role of Lord Fancourt Babberley in a 1933 revival of Charley's Aunt at the Gaiety Theatre

He appeared in supporting roles in several British B films before being offered a key role as Flavius in the 1935 Hollywood movie The Last Days of Pompeii. He also appeared with Bette Davis in the radio play Just Suppose, a fantasy drama about an English king marrying an American woman.

He returned to England in 1936. Two busy years of stage and film work followed, including Over She Goes (1937) in which he sang and danced with co-stars Stanley Lupino and Laddie Cliff. John Wood's last two British films were for the Associated British Picture Corporation, made with fellow Australian actor, Mary Maguire.

== Return to Australia ==
For reasons unknown, he returned to Australia in 1939. He claimed that in film, he had "never really had a role I liked – they have all been light juvenile parts." Despite this, he said he preferred screen work to the stage. "Somehow the screen work is not quite so monotonous," he said. Wood also commented on the attitude of British studios to an Australian accent. "There are two schools of thought about Australian actors in London. The first dislikes the Australian accent, and the second ... is eager to employ them. At Elstree, for instance, Australians are exceedingly popular, the producers considering that they have more punch. Stanley Lupino is also a great supporter for Australians, and employs them whenever possible." War had been declared whilst he was en route back to Australia, and for a short time he returned to the stage. He also developed a reputation for recounting amusing film industry anecdotes.

While he had been in Hollywood his engagement to Australian stage actress Mary MacGregor was announced. Wood and MacGregor had performed together in Australia on stage for J.C. Williamson. The marriage did not proceed but Wood performed again with MacGregor during 1940.

== POW performer ==
In November 1940, Wood joined the Australian Army and was posted to 8th Division as a signalman. His unit arrived in Singapore in early 1941, and like most members of the 8th Division, he entered captivity following the Malayan campaign in February 1942.

While in captivity, Wood took a leading role in providing entertainment for allied Prisoners of War. Official Australian war artist and fellow POW Murray Griffin painted Wood's portrait and sketched performances and players. Russell Braddon another POW, described Wood as "the greatest source of stage anecdotes and comic songs that Changi knew." According to another POW, Wood also dressed up effectively for performances as a woman. "He is the goods, and sure gives the boys ideas," claimed Hedley Hatch.

== Post-war career ==
After his repatriation in 1945, Wood returned to the Australian stage and was active in the Minerva Theatre Players. He married British actress Phil Buchanan in Melbourne in July 1946 and performed in The Hasty Heart and While the Sun Shines for occupying forces in Japan in 1947. By 1949 he had returned to London, and was performing on the stage and radio, several productions having Australian themes. By 1956, his old battalion newsletter reported he was suffering health problems and living quietly in a village in Spain. He died in Australia in 1965.

== Filmography ==
- Full Circle (1935)
- The Girl in the Crowd (1935)
- The Case of Gabriel Perry (1935)
- The Last Days of Pompeii (1935)
- To Catch a Thief (1936)
- Over She Goes (1937)
- Housemaster (1938)
- Oh Boy! (1938)
- Hold My Hand (1938)
- Luck of the Navy (1938)
- Black Eyes (1939)
- An Englishman's Home (1940)
- Stolen Face (1952)
