= Chick (1936 film) =

1936 British film by Michael Hankinson

- Betty Ann Davies, Sydney Howard and Mae Bacon in the film
- Directed by: Michael Hankinson
- Written by: Edgar Wallace (novel); Daniel Wheddon; D. B. Wyndham-Lewis; Gerard Fairlie; Cyril Gardner; Irving Leroy
- Produced by: Jack Raymond
- Starring: Sydney Howard; Betty Ann Davies; Fred Conyngham; Cecil Humphreys
- Cinematography: Francis Carver
- Edited by: John E. Morris
- Music by: Percival Mackey
- Production company: British & Dominions Film Corporation
- Distributed by: United Artists
- Release date: September 1936
- Running time: 72 minutes
- Country: United Kingdom
- Language: English

Chick is a 1936 British comedy crime film directed by Michael Hankinson and starring Sydney Howard, Betty Ann Davies and Fred Conyngham. It was written by Daniel Wheddon, D. B. Wyndham-Lewis, Gerard Fairlie, Cyril Gardner and Irving Leroy, based on the 1923 novel of the same title by Edgar Wallace, which had previously been made into a 1928 silent film. The film was made at Elstree Studios. The hall porter at an Oxbridge College inherits an Earldom and enjoys a series of adventures.

== Plot ==
Chick Beane is University porter who inherits an Earldom. He is pounced upon by a gang of villains running a fraudulent financial oil scheme, thinking his honest face and title would be useful as Chairman of their crooked business's board. The crooks are foiled when they try to escape with their takings, and it turns out that their land, while barren of oil, has valuable mineral waters. It also turns out that Beane is not entitled to an Earldom after all, and he retreats to run a pub financed by the now legitimate company.

== Cast ==
- Sydney Howard as Chick Beane
- Betty Ann Davies as Peggy
- Fred Conyngham as Sir Anthony Monsard
- Cecil Humphreys as Sturgis
- Mae Bacon as Gert
- Wallace Geoffrey as Latimer
- Aubrey Mather as the Dean
- Arthur Chesney as Lord Frensham
- Edmund D'Alby as Rennie
- Robert Nainby as Mr Beane
- Merle Tottenham as maid
- Aubrey Fitzgerald as Banks
- Fred Rains as warden
- Eric Micklewood as undergraduate
- Joe Monkhouse as Mason
- Richard Morris as clerk
- Aubrey Pollock as lawyer

== Reception ==
The Daily Film Renter wrote: "Slender narrative lacks originality, general effect being somewhat feeble and far-fetched, while Howard is forced to rely for laughs on exploitation of familiar eccentricities. ... Offering purely for star fans."

Picture Show wrote: "The pace is slow and the supporting cast have little to do."
