= Falling in Love (1935 film) =

- Directed by: Monty Banks
- Written by: John Paddy Carstairs; Alan Hyman; Lee Loeb; Miles Malleson; Fred Thompson
- Produced by: Howard Welsch
- Starring: Charles Farrell; Mary Lawson; Gregory Ratoff
- Cinematography: Basil Emmott
- Production company: Vogue Film Productions
- Distributed by: Pathé Pictures
- Release date: 4 September 1934
- Running time: 74 minutes
- Country: United Kingdom
- Language: English

Falling in Love is a 1935 British comedy film directed by Monty Banks and starring Charles Farrell, Mary Lawson, Diana Napier and Gregory Ratoff. The film was shot at Walton Studios. It was released in the United States the following year under the alternative title Trouble Ahead.

== Plot ==
The manager of an American film star struggles to cope with her behaviour.

== Cast ==
- Charles Farrell as Howard Elliott
- Mary Lawson as Ann Brent
- Gregory Ratoff as Oscar Marks
- H. F. Maltby as Cummins
- Diana Napier as Gertie
- Cathleen Nesbitt as Mother
- Patrick Aherne as Dick Turner
- Margot Grahame as June Desmond
- Sally Stewart as Winnie
- Monty Banks as Film Director
- Marion Harris as Cafe Singer
- Pat Fitzpatrick as Jackie
- Carroll Gibbons and His Orchestra as Themselves
- Eliot Makeham as Caretaker
- Miles Malleson as Minor Role
- Wally Patch as Boatman

== Bibliography ==
- Low, Rachael. Filmmaking in 1930s Britain. George Allen & Unwin, 1985.
- Wood, Linda. British Films, 1927-1939. British Film Institute, 1986.
