= Toilers of the Sea (1939 film) =

1939 British film

- Mary Lawson and Ian Colin in the film
- Directed by: Ted Fox; Selwyn Jepson
- Written by: Selwyn Jepson
- Based on: Toilers of the Sea by Victor Hugo
- Produced by: L.C. Beaumont
- Starring: Mary Lawson; Cyril McLaglen; Andrews Engelmann
- Cinematography: D.P. Cooper
- Production company: Beaumont Film Productions
- Distributed by: Columbia Pictures
- Release date: 1939
- Running time: 83 minutes
- Country: United Kingdom
- Language: English

Toilers of the Sea is a 1939 British historical drama film directed by Ted Fox and Selwyn Jepson and starring Mary Lawson, Cyril McLaglen and Andrews Engelmann. It was written by Jepson adapted from the 1866 novel of the same title by Victor Hugo. It was made at Wembley Studios.

== Preservation status ==
The British Film Institute National Archive holds no stills or ephemera, and no film or video materials.

== Plot ==
Guernsey shipbuilder Lethierry launches the Durante, his first steamship. But disaster strikes: first, his partner absconds with his fortune, and then the new captain, Clubin, intentionally wrecks the ship to steal the recovered money, only to perish when, during fog, he hits rocks. In a move to save his business, Lethierry promises his daughter’s hand in marriage to anyone who can salvage the ship’s engine. Gilliatt, a master seaman who is in love with the girl, completes the heroic task against all odds. However, he realises that her heart belongs to another man. In a selfless act, Gilliatt claims he no longer loves her and steps aside, even arranging for her to marry the man she truly loves.

== Cast ==
- Mary Lawson as Deruchette
- Cyril McLaglen as Gilliatt
- Andrews Engelmann as Captain Clubin
- Wilson Coleman as Lethierry
- Ian Colin as Peter Caudray
- William Dewhurst as Landois
- Walter Sondes as Rataine

== Reception ==
The Monthly Film Bulletin wrote: "A fine story, but quite spoilt by poor production and mediocre acting. The wreck is quite unconvincing, but there is some good sea photography."

Kine Weekly wrote: "It is too drawn out and discursive to hold the attention to any considerable extent, but should prove useful for quota purposes. Seascapes and camera work are very good... Only intensely strong characterisation could have made this story wholly successful, and in this case, it is on the weak side. Development, too, tends to be scrappy, and scenes are too often over-prolonged for their dramatic strength."

The Daily Film Renter wrote: "For uncritical patrons. Victor Hugo's famous classic could have been made into a big screen spectacle, but this version is terribly naive, the acting leaves much to be desired, and story presentation old-fashioned and patchy."
