= Sam Small Leaves Town =

1937 film

- Trade advertisement
- Directed by: Alfred J. Goulding
- Produced by: Maurice J. Wilson
- Starring: Stanley Holloway; June Clyde; Fred Conyngham
- Music by: Percival Mackey
- Production company: British Screen Service
- Distributed by: British Screen Service
- Release date: November 1937
- Running time: 79 minutes
- Country: United Kingdom
- Language: English

Sam Small Leaves Town (also known as It's Sam Small Again), is a 1937 British comedy film directed by Alfred J. Goulding and starring Stanley Holloway, June Clyde and Fred Conyngham.

It was made at Highbury Studios in London and released as a quota quickie by the independent British Screen Service. Location shooting took place in Skegness in Lincolnshire.

== Plot ==
Well-known actor Richard Manning challenges his newspaper magnate friend Robert Harrison that he can vanish for a week, unable to be tracked down by Harrison's staff. Manning bribes Sam Small, a man about to take a job at a holiday camp, and, donning a disguise, takes his place. Two of the guests at the camp are Sally Elton and Harrison's reporter Jimmy Trent, who fall in love. Manning gets friendly with the couple, and when Jimmy is sacked for being more interested in Sally than his work, Manning makes sure that Jimmy gets the credit for his "capture".

== Cast ==
- Stanley Holloway as Richard Manning
- June Clyde as Sally Elton
- Fred Conyngham as Jimmy West
- Harry Tate as camper
- Johnnie Schofield as Sam Small
- James Craven as Steve Watt
- Robert English as Robert Harrison

== Reception ==
The Monthly Film Bulletin wrote: "The film opens very slowly so that it is difficult to understand what it is all about. The best parts are in the gay sunny atmosphere of the holiday camp with singing, cycling, swimming and love-making. It has amusing moments but is not funny enough to be good throughout."

Kine Weekly wrote: "Cheery high-spirited romantic comedy, played against holiday camp backgrounds of showmanlike variety. The plot provides a sound vehicle for Stanley Holloway, without making too great a demand on the intelligence, and the star seizes each and every opportunity. Support is adequate, and so is the direction.
