= Julius Lenzberg =

German-American composer

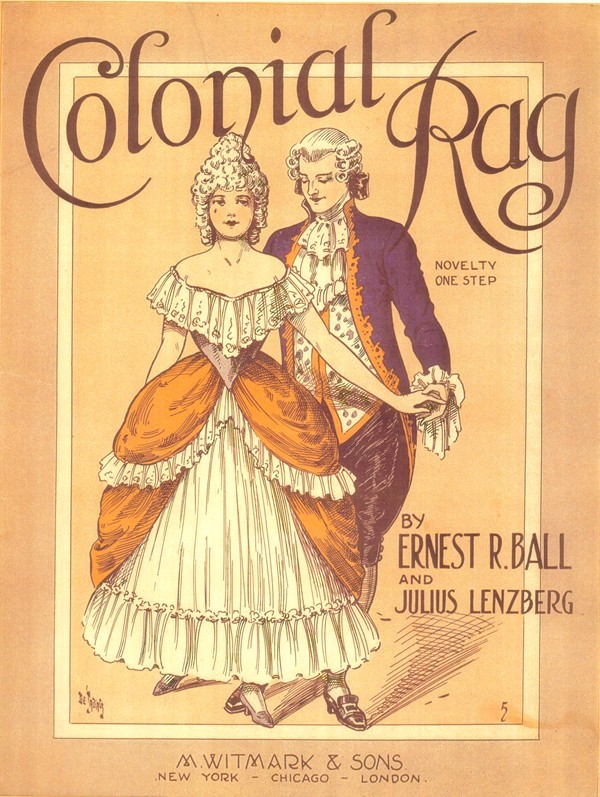
Sheet music cover dated 1914

Hungarian Rag (3:40)
Performed by New York Military Band

Julius Lenzberg (January 3, 1878 to April 24, 1956) was an American composer of ragtime and jazz of German descent. He recorded a substantial number of jazz pieces with orchestra between 1919 and 1922, in addition to ragtime music such as his popular Hungarian Rag of 1913.

== Early life in Baltimore ==
Lenzberg was the youngest child of German (Prussian) immigrants Henry and Julia Lenzberg, and he had many brothers and sisters. His father worked as a cigar packer in Baltimore.

Jules, as he often called himself, worked at the Weber and Fields Vaudeville Club in Baltimore until it closed in November 1897, so the young Lenzberg then played violin and piano elsewhere. By 1900, he had published two marches, and was living with his parents and several siblings. His newly formed "orchestra of soloists" performed in October, 1900 at the Al Reeve's Music Hall in New York. In 1903, Jules married German-born Ella Lenzberg, and they moved permanently to New York City so he could pursue his music career.

== Music career in New York ==
Lenzberg first led an ensemble at New York's Circle Theatre on Broadway near Columbus Circle. The Circle had a troubled existence in its early years, however, switching from legitimate theatre to vaudeville and then to burlesque, and Lenzberg soon was appointed musical director of the nearby Colonial Theatre (New York City) when it became a vaudeville house in May 1905. In the summers, when the Colonial and most New York theatres went dark because of the heat, Lenzberg played in ensembles on Long Island and Long Branch, New Jersey. By 1910 the Lenzbergs had moved to Queens, New York where they remained for the rest of their lives, and the move to Queens marked the beginning of his greatest period of productivity as a composer. The Hungarian Rag was his only huge seller, but his other compositions, though not as successful, still made him a comfortable income. Meanwhile, he continued to be a successful leader of his orchestra at the Colonial Theatre.

He often adapted familiar classical tunes to ragtime, as he did with his Hungarian Rag and Operatic Rag, inspiring others to "rag" famous tunes, though not always as successfully as Lenzberg. His Hungarian Rag was based upon the Hungarian Rhapsodies by Liszt. Lenzberg's Haunting Rag may be his most original work. Among Lenzberg's collaborators was the singer and songwriter Ernest Ball.

Lenzberg was in a group called the "Harmonists" who performed in vaudeville, and he was also musical director for the first "George White's Scandals" revue in 1919 on Broadway. During that period, he was also conductor at B. F. Keith's Riverside Theatre at Broadway and 96th Street (the Keith chain was managed by E. F. Albee at that time, as Keith had died in 1914), where he often led the orchestra with his violin; the Riverside alternated vaudeville programs with film screenings, and the music was always of a popular nature. He and the Riverside Orchestra recorded dance tunes, mostly for Edison Records and for the Pathé label. A news report from 1920 describes an interesting incident there:

Julius Lenzberg, leader of the orchestra at the Riverside Theatre, New York, recently featured during the intermission 'Tired of Me,' the new Irving Berlin, Inc., number. Mr. Lenzberg is something of a violin soloist himself, and put over the number so well that he was compelled to play the chorus twice. 'It is the first time I ever heard an audience demand an encore during intermission,' declared Mr. Lenzberg.

His work at the Riverside Theatre remained popular for years, and some important musicians worked with him. A photograph of the orchestra featured in Edison catalogs and publicity show a young Teddy Brown playing xylophone, and he is featured on the orchestra's Diamond Disc of George Gershwin's "Swanee". Lenzberg stopped recording in 1922, but he continued making appearances throughout the decade on radio and occasionally leading the pit orchestra at the Palace Theater, which was the most desired vaudeville booking in the country and the prize theatre in the Keith-Albee chain.

Lenzberg was the musical director for the 1931 musical Nikki starring Fay Wray in the title role, and Archie Leach as Cary Lockwood (Leach borrowed his character's first name and became Cary Grant). In 1932, Lenzberg became assistant director of the Roxy Theater Symphony Orchestra run by composer Hugo Riesenfeld. He later moved into management, working for a theatrical management and property broker, but returned to the orchestra pit of the Palace Theater on August 10, 1948, for a star-studded gala broadcast on live television. He died at age 78 in 1956.

== List of compositions ==
- 1894 Clifton - Schottische
- 1894: Bell's Academy - March
- 1898 Gallant Commodore
- 1899: Good Night (Good Night) - March
- 1902: The Reindeer
- 1904 My Own Among the Pines Plantation Home
- 1904: I'll Be Happy When I'm Thinking of You [with CE Smith]
- 1907 Little Diamond - Schottische
- 1907 Little Pearl - Waltz
- 1907: Little Ruby - March
- 1907 Little Emerald - Polka
- 1907 Little Onyx - Gavotte
- 1907 Little Sapphire - Reverie
- 1911: Haunting Rag
- 1911: That Rag Madrid
- 1913: Hungarian Rag
- 1913: March of the Nations
- 1913: Some Baby
- 1914: Operatic Rag
- 1914: Colonial Rag - Novelty One Step [Ernest R. Ball]
- 1915 Merry Whirl
- 1915 Cup Hunters
- 1916: Waltz Inspiration
- 1917: Rag-a-Minor
- 1919 Moonlight on the Nile [Gus Kahn & Bud G. DeSylva]
- 1919: Razzle Dazzle
- 1923: American Ideal - March
