= A Lucky Sweep =

1932 film

- Directed by: A. V. Bramble
- Produced by: Harry Rowson
- Starring: John Longden; Diana Beaumont
- Production company: Harry Rowson Productions
- Distributed by: Producers Distributing Corporation
- Release date: 22 March 1932
- Running time: 58 minutes
- Country: United Kingdom
- Language: English

A Lucky Sweep is a 1932 British comedy film directed by A. V. Bramble and starring John Longden, Diana Beaumont and A. G. Poulton. It was made at Elstree Studios as a quota quickie.

== Cast ==
- John Longden as Bill Higgins
- Diana Beaumont as Polly
- A. G. Poulton as Joshua
- Marie Wright as Martha
- Sybil Jane as Miss Grey
- Elsie Prince as Secretary
- Elsie Moore

== Bibliography ==
- Chibnall, Steve. Quota Quickies: The Birth of the British 'B' Film. British Film Institute, 2007.
- Low, Rachael. Filmmaking in 1930s Britain. George Allen & Unwin, 1985.
- Wood, Linda. British Films, 1927-1939. British Film Institute, 1986.
