= To Catch a Thief (1936 film) =

- Directed by: Maclean Rogers
- Screenplay by: H.F. Maltby; Kathleen Butler
- Based on: play by Margaret McDonell and Gordon McDonell,
- Starring: John Garrick; Mary Lawson; H. F. Maltby
- Release date: 1936
- Country: United Kingdom
- Language: English

To Catch a Thief is a 1936 British comedy film directed by Maclean Rogers and starring John Garrick, Mary Lawson and H. F. Maltby. It was written by Maltby and Kathleen Butler based on the play by Margaret McDonell and Gordon McDonell. It was made as a quota quickie.

== Preservation status ==
The British Film Institute National Archive holds a collection of stills but no film or video materials.

== Plot ==
Hoping to sell his invention of a car anti-theft device to car magnate Sir Herbert Condine, young inventor John borrows a vehicle from an absent friend's garage to install his prototype and get Sir Herbert's attention. When John and his girlfriend Anne inadvertently stumble upon a ring of burglars using the garage as a hideout, they use the anti-theft device to trap and capture the criminals. Having seen its worth, an impressed Sir Herbert invests in the device.

== Cast ==
- John Garrick as John
- Mary Lawson as Anne
- H. F. Maltby as Sir Herbert Condine
- John Wood as Bill Lowther
- Vincent Holman as Galloway
- Gordon McLeod as detective
- Eliot Makeham as secretary
- Max Adrian as salesman

== Reception ==
The Monthly Film Bulletin wrote: "The plot is rather weak. ... H. F. Maltby walks off with the acting honours as the irritable Sir Herbert Condine, but the rest of the cast are good."

The Daily Film Renter wrote: "Developed with overplus of unoriginal dislogue, subject culminates in ludicrous climax. ... H. F. Maltby scores in characteristically irascible study, but remainder of cast fail to infuse conviction into poor material. ... It is impossible to arouse much enthusiasm for this effort, which rambles along to the tune of stilted dialogue, some of which, presumably, is meant to be amusing, although that desirable result cannot always be said to be achieved."

Picture Show wrote: "There is little to entertain anyone in this story of a penniless young inventor who has invented a device to foil thieves, and his adventures in selling it. The direction is weak, and the players have no chance to do anything with their characters or the feeble dialogue."

The Hollywood Reporter wrote: "Slow, tedious and stupid production gets nowhere at all. At a long chance its alleged comedy might register with the nit-witted giggle section of ultra-uncritical audiences. H.F. Maltby is best of an undistinguished cast, clicking on the pompous humors of a Napoleonic magnate."
