= Colin Wark =

British composer (1896–1939)

- Born: 1896; London, England
- Died: 1939 (aged 42–43); United Kingdom
- Occupation: Film composer

Colin Wark (1896 – 1939) was a British composer of film scores, theatre music and light music, born in Ealing, West London and educated at Berkhamsted School. Many of the films he scored were "quota quickies", mostly low-cost, low-quality, quickly-accomplished films commissioned by American distributors active in the UK or by British cinema owners purely to satisfy the quota requirements.

Wark was also the composer of the score for Tulip Time, a comedy with music based on the play The Strange Adventures of Miss Brown by Robert Buchanan (1841-1901) and Charles Marlowe. Tulip Time opened at the Alhambra Theatre in London on August 14, 1935 and ran for 425 performances.

In 1932 he was responsible for launching and managing Pasquale Troise and his Mandoliers, an orchestra of about 16 mandolin, accordion, guitar and tuned percussion players that made a series of BBC broadcasts between 1932 and 1933, and which went on to be the most frequently used band on the long-running BBC series Music While You Work (1940-1967).

Wark's light music compositions include the novelty intermezzo Animal Antics, Bouncing Ball (xylophone or piccolo solo), and Chrysanthemums for orchestra and piano. The Wedding of the Three Blind Mice, song/foxtrot, composed with Walter Williams and Bruce Sievier, was published in 1931. Philip L Scowcroft has suggested that Wark used the pseudonym Michele Lesley for some compositions, such as Waltz Serene.

Wark worked for 12 years as musical advisor to the publishers Ricordi. He was married to actress Violet Kearney (1907-1985) who appeared as a dancer in the 1934 film Say It with Flowers, scored by Wark. There was one child, a son. Wark died in 1939 in Hendon, Middlesex.

== Selected filmography ==
- Creeping Shadows (1931)
- Reunion (1932)
- Eyes of Fate (1933)
- The First Mrs. Fraser (1932)
- The Golden Cage (1933)
- Side Streets (1933)
- Song of the Plough (1933)
- The Wishbone (1933)
- Doss House (1933)
- Colonel Blood (1934)
- Say It with Flowers (1934)
- Lest We Forget (1934)
- Menace (1934)
- White Ensign (1934)
- Bypass to Happiness (1934)
- Old Roses (1935)
- Rolling Home (1935)
- Irish and Proud of It (1936)
- The Crimes of Stephen Hawke (1936)
- Dreams Come True (1936)
- The Big Noise (1936)
- Rhythm in the Air (1936)
- Wedding Group (1936)
- Catch as Catch Can (1937)
- Concerning Mr. Martin (1937)
- The Mill on the Floss (1937)
- The Black Tulip (1937)
- Wanted! (1937)
- Who Goes Next? (1938)
- Garden of the Sea (1942) (travelogue: Scilly Isles)
