= The Indiscretions of Eve =

1932 film by Cecil Arthur Lewis

- German poster
- Directed by: Cecil Lewis
- Written by: Cecil Lewis
- Produced by: Cecil Lewis
- Starring: Steffi Duna; Fred Conyngham; Lester Matthews
- Cinematography: Phil Grindrod; James Wilson
- Edited by: Walter Stokvis
- Production company: British International Pictures
- Distributed by: Wardour Films
- Release date: 20 August 1932
- Running time: 63 minutes
- Country: United Kingdom
- Language: English

The Indiscretions of Eve is a 1932 British comedy film directed by Cecil Lewis and starring Steffi Duna, Fred Conyngham and Lester Matthews. It was made by British International Pictures at the company's Elstree Studios near London. The film's sets were designed by the art director Clarence Elder.

== Cast ==
- Steffi Duna as Eve
- Fred Conyngham as Sir Peter Martin
- Lester Matthews as Ralph
- Tony Sympson as Pip
- Jessica Tandy as Maid
- Clifford Heatherley as Butler
- Hal Gordon as Simms
- Muriel Aked as Mother
- Arthur Chesney as Father
- George Mozart as Smart
- Teddy Brown as Barman
- Marius B. Winter as Band Leader
- George Gray as Minor Role
- Pearl Hay as Minor Role
- Stella Nelson as Minor Role
- Bruce Winston as Minor Role

== Bibliography ==
- Low, Rachael. Filmmaking in 1930s Britain. George Allen & Unwin, 1985.
- Wood, Linda. British Films, 1927-1939. British Film Institute, 1986.
