= Cotton Queen =

1937 British film by Bernard Vorhaus

- Directed by: Bernard Vorhaus
- Written by: Syd Courtenay; Louis Golding; Scott Pembroke; Barry Peake
- Produced by: Joe Rock
- Starring: Stanley Holloway; Will Fyffe; Mary Lawson; Helen Haye
- Cinematography: Cyril Bristow; Horace Wheddon
- Edited by: Max Brenner
- Music by: Cyril Ray
- Production company: Rock Studios
- Distributed by: British Independent Exhibitors' Distributors (UK)
- Release date: May 1937
- Running time: 80 minutes
- Country: United Kingdom
- Language: English

Cotton Queen (also known as Crying Out Loud) is a 1937 British comedy film directed by Bernard Vorhaus, and starring Stanley Holloway, Will Fyffe, and Mary Lawson. It was written by Syd Courtenay, Louis Golding, Scott Pembroke and Barry Peake.

== Plot ==
Rival mill owners Sam Owen and Bill Todcaster fiercely resist merging their businesses, even though a lucrative American contract would require their combined resources. Complications escalate over choosing a candidate for the local Cotton Queen festival, while a romance blossoms between Bill’s niece Mary and Sam’s son Jack. Ultimately, tensions resolve at the crowning of the Cotton Queen, securing both the business deal and the young couple's future.

== Cast ==
- Will Fyffe as Bob Todcastle
- Stanley Holloway as Sam Owen
- Mary Lawson as Joan
- Helen Haye as Margaret Owen
- Marcelle Rogez as Zita de la Rue
- C. Denier Warren as Joseph Cotter
- Syd Courtenay as Mayor
- Gibson Gowland as jailer

== Production ==
The film was made at Elstree Studios for the independent producer Joe Rock. Its Lancashire setting was an attempt to capitalise on the popularity of the George Formby series of films.

Cotton Queen was the final film Vorhaus made in Britain. Following the collapse of Julius Hagen's Twickenham Studios, where he had directed most of his films during the previous few years, he returned to the United States.

== Reception ==
The Monthly Film Bulletin wrote: "The dialogue is mainly in Lancashire dialect. It is amusing and natural, and there are some good and funny gags. Some of the incidents are perhaps a little drawn out, and a few judicious cuts might be an improvement. But on the whole it is a pleasant popular light entertainment with an especial interest for North Country audiences."

Kine Weekly wrote: "Jolly kaleidoscopic comedy of Lancashire industrial and life, augmented by great performances on the parts of Stanley Holloway and Will Fyffe, the English screen's incomparable comedians. Story values are not the entertainment's strongest assets, but in place of these is rich variety of background, exhilarating slapstick humour, heart interest and kindly drama. The film skims the cream off all that is best in popular light diversion and is, therefore, an, outstanding box-offiice proposition for North Country situations, and more than a sound one for Southern."
