= School for Stars =

1935 film directed by Donovan Pedelty

- Promotional press-book
- Directed by: Donovan Pedelty
- Written by: Donovan Pedelty; Charles Austin
- Produced by: Anthony Havelock-Allan
- Starring: Fred Conyngham; Jean Gillie; Torin Thatcher
- Music by: Geraldo
- Production company: British and Dominions
- Distributed by: Paramount British Pictures
- Release date: June 1935
- Running time: 70 minutes
- Country: United Kingdom
- Language: English

School for Stars is a 1935 British romance film directed by Donovan Pedelty and starring Fred Conyngham, Jean Gillie and Torin Thatcher. It was written by Pedelty and Charles Austin, and made at British and Dominions Elstree Studios as a quota quickie.

== Preservation status ==
The British Film Institute National Archive holds a press-book but no film or video materials.

== Plot ==
Joan Martin is waitress in a country road-house with dreams of becoming a famous star. When a customer drops £30 in front of her, she tells him such a sum would completely change her life. He gives her the money and she enrols at a London theatrical school. Although unhappy there, she wins the Beginners' Prize of £40, noticed by the patron of the school, who turns out to be the road-house customer. He persuades her to stick the course out, and she finds romance with fellow-pupil Frank Murray.

== Cast ==
- Fred Conyngham as Frank Murray
- Jean Gillie as Joan Martin
- Torin Thatcher as Guy Mannering
- Peggy Novak as Phyllis Dawn
- Ian Fleming as Sir Geoffrey Hilliard
- Frank Birch as Robert Blake
- Winifred Oughton as Mrs. Dealtry
- Victor Stanley as Bill
- Geraldo as himself
- Effie Atherton
- Phyllis Calvert
- Rosamund Greenwood

== Reception ==
Kine Weekly wrote: "The material is very thin and artificial in effect, but direction is competent and the picture is technically quite good. Useful for quota purposes but not likely to be received very enthusiastically. In a very artificial role Jean Gillie shows to advantage. She is graceful as a dancer and has distinct possibilities."

The Daily Film Renter wrote: "Naive material and uninspired direction make it difficult for subject to achieve conviction. Acting for most part indifferent. Quota offering for uncritical audiences only."

Picture Show wrote: "Jean Gillie makes a charming heroine in this fragile little comedy of a waitress who joins an academy of dramatic art. Although the idea has not been developed to its best, it is pleasant enough light entertainment."
