= Arthur Chesney =

English actor (1881–1949)

- Arthur Chesney in Hindle Wakes (1927)
- Born: Arthur William Kellaway; 21 November 1881; Wandsworth, London, England
- Died: 27 August 1949 (aged 67); Hampstead, London, England
- Occupation: Actor
- Years active: 1920–1948
- Spouse(s): Estelle Winwood (m. 1907; div. 1928); Kitty Ridge (m. 19??; ? 19??)
- Children: Ann Dummett
- Family: Edmund Gwenn (brother); Cecil Kellaway (cousin); Alec Kellaway (cousin)

Arthur William Kellaway (21 November 1881 – 27 August 1949), known as Arthur Chesney, was an English character actor who worked on stage and screen.

== Biography ==
He was born 21 November 1881 in Hampstead, London, the son of John and Catherine Kellaway (née Oliver). He was the brother of the actor Edmund Gwenn and the cousin of the actor Cecil Kellaway. He married actress Estelle Winwood in 1907 but their marriage was dissolved and she remarried in 1928. He later married artist Kathleen (Kitty) Ridge (1901–1988), and they had daughter Ann Dummett in 1930. Ann went on to become a racial justice activist.

Chesney made his first stage appearance in 1903, in a play at County Theatre in Bedford. He took part in many plays in London and New York, and also appeared in more than 25 films. He died in a hospital on 27 August 1949 following a massive stroke in Hampstead, aged 67.

== Filmography ==
Year	Title	Role	Notes
1914	Lights of London	Harold Armytage	
1920	The Lure of Crooning Water	Gerald Pinkerton	
1927	The Lodger: A Story of the London Fog	Her Husband	
1927	Hindle Wakes	Sir Timothy Farrar	
1930	French Leave	Gen. Root	
1931	The Shadow Between	Pug Wilson	
1932	Lord Babs	Mr. Turpin	
1932	The Indiscretions of Eve	Father	
1932	Fires of Fate	Mr. Braddell	
1933	Forging Ahead	Shutley	
1933	Chelsea Life	Ambrose Lincoln	
1933	The Fortunate Fool	Battling Stubbs aka Batty	
1933	Night of the Garter	Vicar	
1933	Sorrell and Son	Mr. Porteous	
1934	Colonel Blood	Samuel Pepys	
1934	The Queen's Affair		Uncredited
1934	Youthful Folly	Lord Wilmington	
1936	Chick	Lord Frensham	
1936	Sensation	Ernie Turnpit	
1937	O.H.M.S.	Suger Daddy	Uncredited
1937	London Melody	Marius' Butler	
1937	Please Teacher	Round	
1937	Song of the Forge	Huckleberry	
1945	I Know Where I'm Going!	Harmonica Player	
1948	The Flamingo Affair	Roberts	(final film role)
