= The Secret Voice =

1936 film by George Pearson

- John Stuart and Diana Beaumont in the film
- Directed by: George Pearson
- Screenplay by: Margaret McDonell; Frances Warren
- Produced by: Anthony Havelock-Allan
- Starring: John Stuart; Diana Beaumont; John Kevan
- Cinematography: Francis Carver
- Production company: Paramount British Productions
- Release date: 1936
- Running time: 68 minutes
- Country: United Kingdom
- Language: English

The Secret Voice is a 1936 British thriller film directed by George Pearson and starring John Stuart, Diana Beaumont and John Kevan. It was written by Margaret McDonell and Frances Warren, and was produced as a quota quickie by Paramount British Productions. The screenplay concerns a scientist trying to prevent his new invention from being discovered by enemy spies.

== Premise ==
Young English scientist Dick Allinson invents non-inflammable petrol, and for security records his formula on the soundtrack of a film. He asks his sister, Helen, to take it to Geneva where it will be referenced in an English politician's important speech to the League of Nations. Meanwhile, international crook Brandt traps Allinson in a hotel. Allinson refuses to hand over the formula and escapes, but suspected of having murdered Brandt's accomplice. Jim Knowles, an admirer of Helen's, and who looks like Allinson, offers to be arrested in his place. The police, having discovered the identity of the murderer, release Allinson and Knowles, who then transmit the formula by telephone to Geneva. After a fight with Brandt, in which he falls down a mineshaft, matters are resolved, and Jim and Helen are engaged.

== Cast ==
- John Stuart as Jim Knowles
- Diana Beaumont as Helen Allinson
- John Kevan as Dick Allinson
- Henry Victor as Brandt
- Ruth Gower as Joan Grayson
- Monti DeLyle as Perez
- James Carew as Scotty

== Critical reception ==
Kine Weekly wrote: "International crook drama, played straight but with good comedy touches. The plot at no time is highly convincing, but becomes entertaining by its numerous complications, its love interest, and occasional moments of rapid-fire dialogue."

The Daily Film Renter wrote: "Far-fetched and somewhat meandering story, which neither acting nor treatment makes convincing, but some action and attractive indoor settings. ...John Stuart comes out of it as well as anyone in the part of the heroine's friend, but his abilities are not taxed to any extent."

In Picturegoer, Lionel Collier wrote: "John Stuart puts over a capable and smoothly acted performance in this none too convincing international crook drama which has numerous complications and the usual love interest. The drama is relieved by touches of comedy, but occasionally the plot itself is apt to score unintentional laughs as well. ... Diana Beaumont is fair as Helen but does not seem to be too happily cast."
