= Fred Conyngham =

Australian actor (1901–1974)

- Born: Fred Conyngham; 8 June 1901; Sydney, New South Wales, Australia
- Died: 8 May 1974 (aged 72)

Fred Conyngham (June 8, 1901 – May 8, 1974) was an Australian actor from Sydney.

He was the son of George Conyngham, an actor and stage manager. The younger Conyngham began his career as a specialty dancer. He left musical comedy for drama; then, after discovering he possessed a good tenor voice, he had it trained and returned to musical comedy as a leading man. He toured the world and on his return was given a part in the film The Indiscretions of Eve (1932), which began his film career.

== Partial filmography ==
- The Indiscretions of Eve (1932)
- Radio Parade of 1935 (1934)
- Key to Harmony (1935)
- School for Stars (1935)
- Ball at Savoy (1936)
- Chick (1936)
- Beloved Imposter (1936)
- She Knew What She Wanted (1936)
- Wake Up Famous (1937)
- The Minstrel Boy (1937)
- Sam Small Leaves Town (1937)
- When You Come Home (1948)
