= Diana Beaumont =

British actress (1909–1964)

- Born: 8 May 1909
- Died: 21 June 1964 (aged 55)
- Occupation: Actress

Diana Beaumont (8 May 1909 – 21 June 1964) was a British actress. In 1932 she starred in the West End run of the hit comedy While Parents Sleep by Anthony Kimmins, while in 1934 she appeared in Ian Hay's Admirals All.

== Selected filmography ==
- Alibi (1929)
- The Old Man (1931)
- When London Sleeps (1932)
- A Lucky Sweep (1932)
- Side Streets (1933)
- Autumn Crocus (1934)
- A Real Bloke (1935)
- The Secret Voice (1936)
- They Didn't Know (1936)
- Birds of a Feather (1936)
- Make It Three (1938)
- Murder in Soho (1939)
- Come On George! (1939)
- Hi Gang! (1941)
- Let the People Sing (1942)
- Stolen Face (1952)
- Home at Seven (1952)
- Aunt Clara (1954)
