= Ann Dummett =

British activist (1930–2012)

Ann, Lady Dummett
- Born: Agnes Margaret Ann Chesney; 4 September 1930; St George Hanover Square, London, England
- Died: 7 February 2012 (aged 81); Oxford, England
- Education: Ware Grammar School for Girls; Somerville College, Oxford
- Occupations: Activist, author
- Years active: 1950s–2012
- Spouse: Sir Michael Dummett (m. 1951; died 2011)
- Children: 7
- Parent(s): Arthur Chesney; Kitty Chesney (née Ridge)
- Family: Edmund Gwenn (uncle); Cecil Kellaway (cousin); Alec Kellaway (cousin)

Ann, Lady Dummett (born Agnes Margaret Ann Chesney; 4 September 1930 – 7 February 2012) was an English activist, campaigner for racial justice and published author.

== Early life and career ==
Ann (as she was always known) was born on 4 September 1930 at Westminster Hospital, the daughter of actor Arthur Chesney (1882–1949) and artist Kathleen ('Kitty') née Ridge (1901–1988). At the time of her birth her parents lived in Pimlico, London, but she was to grow up in Battersea, then a poor working-class part of the city, And the family were so 'hard up' that Kitty "sometimes pretended she had eaten earlier to have enough food to feed her".

She was a child prodigy, being able to read at the age of two. A 'lifelong friend' Jill Kaye recalled that "at the British Museum when we were five or six ... an old chap gave her sixpence ... impressed she was translating Ancient Greek from the Rosetta Stone."

Ann attended Guildhouse School in Pimlico, London, and then, having fled the blitz with her mother, was educated at Ware Grammar School in Hertfordshire She performed exceptionally at the latter, and unusually for a young woman of her background, won a scholarship to read modern history at Somerville College, Oxford from where she graduated in 1951. She was awarded an MA at the same.

In December 1951 she married the philosopher Michael Dummett at the Roman Catholic Church of St Edmund and St Frideswide, Oxford. And she devoted most of the next few years to looking after their seven children (two of whom died at a young age). In 1955 Dummett travelled with her husband to the University of California, Berkeley, where he had been awarded a fellowship. They both joined the National Association for the Advancement of Colored People and heard Martin Luther King Jr. address a rally.

With Evan Luard, Oxford's MP, they founded the Oxford Committee for Racial Integration, forerunner to Oxfordshire Council for Community Relations, and she became a full-time community relations officer .

She went on to work at the Institute of Race Relations, the Joint Council for the Welfare of Immigrants and the Runnymede Trust of which she was director from 1984 to 1987.

Dummett died on 7 February 2012 in Oxford, six weeks after the death of her husband.

== Publications ==
- A Portrait of English Racism, Penguin, 1973; ISBN 0140216073
- Citizenship and Nationality, Runnymede Trust, London, 1976
- A New Immigration Policy, Runnymede Trust, London, 1978
- British Nationality: the AGIN guide to the new law (with Ian Martin), published for the Action Group on Immigration and Nationality by the National Council for Civil Liberties, London, 1982; ISBN 0901108995
- Towards a Just Immigration Policy (ed.), Cobden Trust, London, 1986; ISBN 0900137266
- Subjects, Citizens, Aliens and Others, (with Andrew Nicol), Weidenfeld and Nicolson, 1990 ISBN 9780297820253
- Racially Motivated Crime: responses in three European cities: Frankfurt, Lyons and Rome (ed.), Commission for Racial Equality, London 1997; ISBN 1854422014

For a complete bibliography (and an introduction to her work) see "Ann Dummett's Contribution to the Understanding of Immigration and Racism" (2015).
