= Too Many Husbands (1938 film) =

1938 film

- Iris Baker, Jack Melford and Philip Leaver in the film.
- Directed by: Ivar Campbell
- Written by: Ivar Campbell
- Based on: Too Many Husbands by Guy Bolton
- Produced by: Ivar Campbell
- Starring: Jack Melford; Geoffrey Sumner; Brian Oulton
- Cinematography: Ernest Palmer
- Production company: Liberty Films
- Distributed by: Liberty Films
- Release date: 22 December 1938
- Running time: 59 minutes
- Country: United Kingdom
- Language: English

Too Many Husbands is a 1938 British comedy film directed and written by Ivar Campbell and starring Jack Melford, Geoffrey Sumner and Brian Oulton. It was shot at Isleworth Studios in London as a quota quickie.

== Preservation status ==
The British Film Institute National Archive holds no stills or ephemera, and no film or video materials.

== Synopsis ==
On the French Riviera, a man who has faked his own death in order to avoid his creditors is paid back by his wife who now pretends to be married to his valet.

== Cast ==
- Jack Melford as Stephen Brinkway
- Iris Baker as Clare Brinkway
- Geoffrey Sumner as Captain Corrie
- Philip Leaver as François
- David Baxter as Le Fletange
- Brian Oulton as Pottleby
- Suzanne Lyle as Ruth

== Reception ==
The Monthly Film Bulletin wrote: "Jack Melford's difficult task of conveying the double-sidedness of an unscrupulous husband with a proclivity towards women requires a more persuasive interpretation. The straightforward sketch of George Sumner's as a certain Captain Corrie is typically good, but the premiss of Clare Brinkway's attraction is inadequately developed."

Kine Weekly wrote: "The story has a diverting ingenuity, and this, together with spirited team-work, compensates in adequate measure for somewhat limited technical presentation. Taken all round, the film is pleasant light entertainment. ... Jack Melford is in good form as Stephen; the part fits his personality and talent, and Tris Baker acts with spirit and intelligence as Clare."

Picture Show wrote: "Competently acted and directed comedy ... In the end there are few people in the story who haven't posed as somebody else, while the swindler's wife has collected a handful of other 'husbands.' Fairly entertaining."
