= Teddy Brown =

American entertainer (1900–1946)

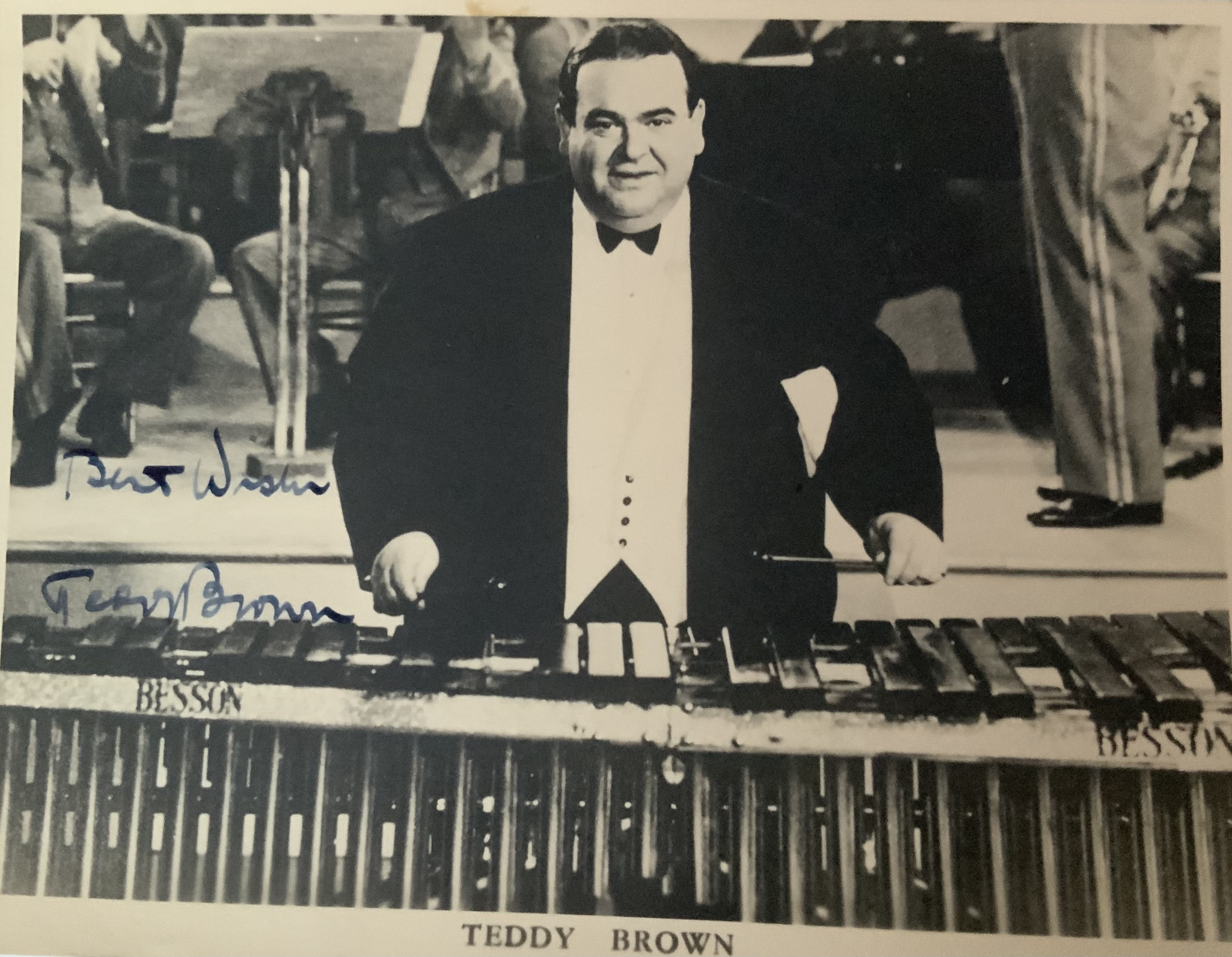
- Born: Abraham Himmelbrand; May 25, 1900; Brooklyn, New York, U.S.
- Died: April 30, 1946 (aged 45); Birmingham, England
- Occupations: Entertainer, musician
- Years active: c.1916–1946

Teddy Brown (born Abraham Ted Himmelbrand, New York, May 25, 1900 – Birmingham, England, April 30, 1946) was an American entertainer and musician who spent the latter part of his life performing in Britain. His main musical instrument was the xylophone, but he also was a whistler and played the saxophone, drums, and marimba.

== Life and career ==
Brown was born Abraham Himmelbrand, the son of Polish Jewish immigrants David and Anne Weisberg, brother of Jacob (b. 1895) and Herman (b. 1898).

He first played in the New York Philharmonic Orchestra, but he moved to the field of popular music in the late 1910s. Between 1917 and 1919, Brown played xylophone and marimba with Earl Fuller's Rector Novelty Orchestra, whose recordings prominently feature his playing. At a performance with Fuller's orchestra at the Brunswick Hotel in Lancaster, New York, Brown was introduced as the leading marimba soloist of the world; he played four-mallet arrangements on a Deagan Marimba-Xylophone No. 4726 accompanied by the 18-piece band. This performance inspired xylophonist Clair Omar Musser (1901-1998) to study with Brown's former teacher and became a marimba virtuoso. Brown was a percussionist for a time with Julius Lenzberg's Riverside Theatre Orchestra, and his later recordings were xylophone solos with Lenzberg's band on Edison Records in 1919 and 1920.

In 1924 and 1925, Brown played drums with Johnny Basilone and his Harlem Tea Garden Orchestra, which broadcast from New York's WEBJ station.

On July 16, 1918, he married Sophie Inselberg in New York. The couple had three children: Joseph (1921-1921), Blossom (1925-1996) and Stewart (b. 1929 - deceased).

Brown arrived in London in 1925 with Joseph C. Smith and his Orchestra. The next year he formed his own orchestra, playing at the Café de Paris. He went on to play in other nightclubs both in London and Paris including the Kit Kat Club. Brown often performed as a solo act but also played xylophone with piano accompaniment. The custom-made Besson xylophone he played had a five-octave range, one more than the normal. In 1927, the UK division of Lee de Forest's Phonofilm made a short film of Brown playing this instrument. He also played a six-octave instrument.

Brown was noted for his rotund appearance, approaching 400 pounds (28st 8lb, 180 kg) in weight, and was often compared to (or considered the British answer to) another rotund band leader of the same era, Paul Whiteman. He was sometimes billed as "The Great Xylophonist", emphasising his physical size. Besides the xylophone, Brown played other percussion instruments as well as tenor saxophone. He also whistled melodies while playing percussion, and his act included comic patter. Brown's rapid-fire style, performing on fast-paced tunes, was an early influence on percussionist and bandleader Spike Jones, who would launch his career a decade later.

As Brown's considerable percussive skills and fame in the UK spread, he appeared in an early sound feature-length movie in 1930. Co-directed by a young Alfred Hitchcock, Elstree Calling is a musical variety review that answered Paul Whiteman's music review feature film of the same year, King of Jazz; both films feature early colour sequences. Elstree was the movie and radio studio complex where many famous films and radio shows were produced in the early days of British media entertainment. A variety of impressive older musical and comedic vaudeville acts and new talent were featured in each of the two films. Brown's third appearance in the film is the most impressive; he plays the xylophone with fast precision, using only one hand at a time and sometimes behind his back. He played "a continuous run of notes right down the full length of the instrument while simultaneously spinning his entire body around through 360 degrees ... so swiftly and effortlessly that it is difficult to see how it is done, although repeated [film] viewings reveal that he achieves the continuity of playing by swapping from his right hand to his left and back to his right while spinning".

From 1931 on, Brown played xylophone on the radio, in films, and on the variety stage. His appearance was dapper but stout, but he was nimble and often danced around the xylophone while playing. He appeared in the Royal Variety Performance in 1931. He was associated with The Crazy Gang and was often the subject of their jokes.

Brown was a member of the British Grand Order of Water Rats. He was King Rat in 1946, although his term was cut short; Brown died at 5:30 a.m. on April 30, 1946 at the Queens Hotel in Birmingham from coronary thrombosis at age 45, after appearing in a concert at the Wolverhampton Hippodrome.

== Selected filmography ==
- Elstree Calling (1930)
- The Indiscretions of Eve (1932)
- On the Air (1934)
- København, Kalundborg og - ? (1934)
- Variety Parade (1936)
- Convict 99 (1938) as Slim Charlie
