= Norman Loudon =

British businessman and film producer

Norman Loudon was a British businessman and film producer. Loudon was the driving force behind the creation of Shepperton Studios, which he established in 1931. Loudon ran Sound City Films, which despite ambitious plans, often found itself producing quota quickies during the 1930s. He sold controlling interest in the studios in 1945 to Sir Alexander Korda.

== Selected filmography ==
- Reunion (1932)
- Colonel Blood (1934)
- Lest We Forget (1934)
- Youthful Folly (1934)
- The Diplomatic Lover (1934)
- Designing Women (1934)
- Radio Pirates (1935)
- Rolling Home (1935)

== Bibliography ==
- Warren, Patricia. British Film Studios: An Illustrated History. Batsford, 1995.
