= Ivar Campbell =

New Zealand screenwriter and film director (1904–1985)

- Born: Donald Robert Ivar Campbell; 8 September 1904; Ōtaki, New Zealand
- Died: 19 May 1985 (aged 80); Tiverton, Devon
- Occupations: Film director Screenwriter
- Years active: 1932–1938

Donald Robert Ivar Campbell (8 September 1904 – 19 May 1985) was a New Zealand-British screenwriter and film director.

== Personal life ==
Campbell was born in New Zealand in 1904 to Lt-Col Robert Ormus Campbell and Beatrice (née Cadell). . He married Sheila Milligan on 14 July 1934 at Littleton Church, near Shepperton. In 1939, he was a farmer in Devon, living with his wife, a film scenario writer, and widowed mother, Beatrice.

In 1951, he was living at Knowstone Manor in Devon, a swastika-shaped farmhouse built in 1938 by a German fascist.

In 1960, Campbell and his wife purchased Tiverton Castle in Devon which was inherited by his nephew, Angus, in 1985.

Sheila Campbell is credited as a writer on Belles of St Clements, Feather Your Nest and Expert Opinion.

== Selected filmography ==
As director unless otherwise noted.

- Reunion (1932) – producer
- Song of the Plough (1933) – producer
- The Wishbone (1933) – producer
- Paris Plane (1933) – producer
- Doss House (1933) – producer
- She Was Only a Village Maiden (1933) – producer
- The Diplomatic Lover (1934) – producer
- Bypass to Happiness (1934) – producer
- Designing Women (1934)
- The Mad Hatters (1935)
- Expert's Opinion (1935)
- The Belles of St. Clements (1936)
- Grand Finale (1936)
- Feather Your Nest (1937)
- Captain's Orders (1937)
- Too Many Husbands (1938)
