= Shepperton Studios =

Film studio, special effects studios and pre- and post-production centre

Coordinates: 51°24′24.80″N 0°27′54.65″W

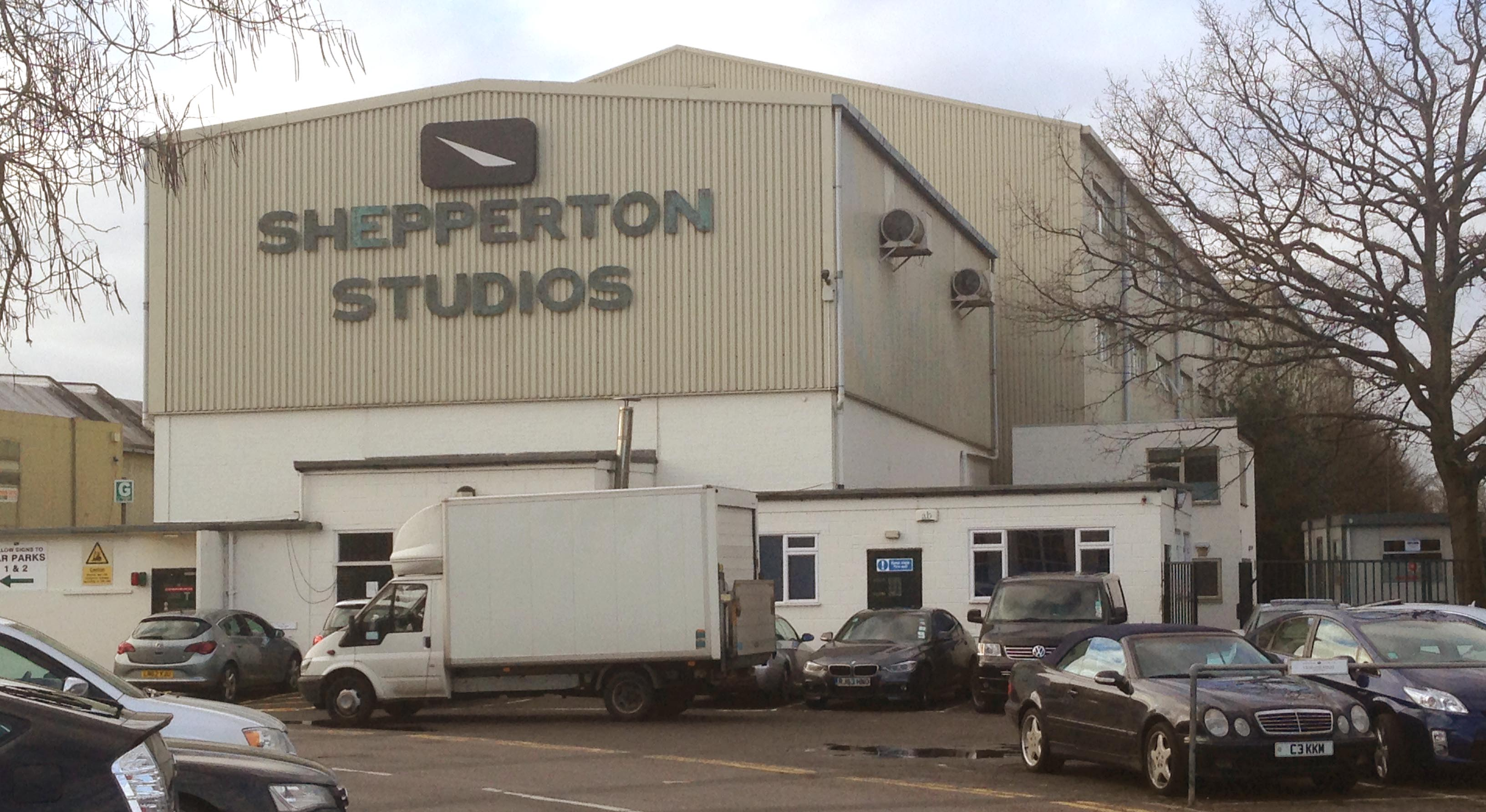
- Shepperton Studios in January 2014
- Type: Subsidiary
- Industry: Film, television
- Genre: Film studio
- Founded: 1931; 95 years ago (as Sound Film Producing & Recording Studios)
- Headquarters: Shepperton, Surrey, England
- Parent: Pinewood Group

Shepperton Studios is a film studio located in Shepperton, Surrey, England, with a history dating back to 1931. It is now part of the Pinewood Studios Group. During its early existence, the studio was branded as Sound City (not to be confused with the Californian Sound City Studios).

== History ==
=== 1930s–1960s ===
Shepperton Studios was built on the grounds of Littleton Park, which was built in the 17th century by local nobleman Thomas Wood. The old mansion still stands on the site.

Scottish businessman Norman Loudon purchased Littleton Park in 1931 for use by his new film company, Sound Film Producing & Recording Studios; the facility opened in 1932. The studios, which produced both short and feature films, expanded rapidly. Proximity to the Vickers-Armstrongs aircraft factory at Brooklands, which attracted German bombers, disrupted filming during the Second World War, as did the requisitioning of the studios in 1941 by the government, who first used it for sugar storage and later to create decoy aircraft and munitions for positioning in the Middle East. The Ministry of Aircraft Production also took over part of the studios for the production of Vickers Wellington bomber components early in the war.

After re-opening in 1945, the studios changed hands. When Sir Alexander Korda purchased British Lion Films, he also acquired a controlling interest in Sound City and Shepperton Studios. Among the films in which he was involved during this period were The Fallen Idol (1948) and The Third Man (1949) which was shot both at the studios and on location and has been referred to as the best British film noir.

In spite of such successes, British Lion ran into financial difficulties in the 1950s when it was unable to repay a 1949 loan from the National Film Finance Corporation and went into receivership on 1 July 1954. In January 1955, a new company, British Lion Films Ltd, was formed and Roy and John Boulting took over at Shepperton Studios. The studio was rebuilt and reopened in September 1958. The Boulting's comedies, such as I'm All Right Jack (1959), were produced there, as were dramas from other film-makers such as J. Lee Thompson's The Guns of Navarone (1961). The studio's other projects from the same decade include Stanley Kubrick's Dr Strangelove (1964) and the musical Oliver! (1968), which won the Academy Award for Best Picture.

=== 1970s–present ===
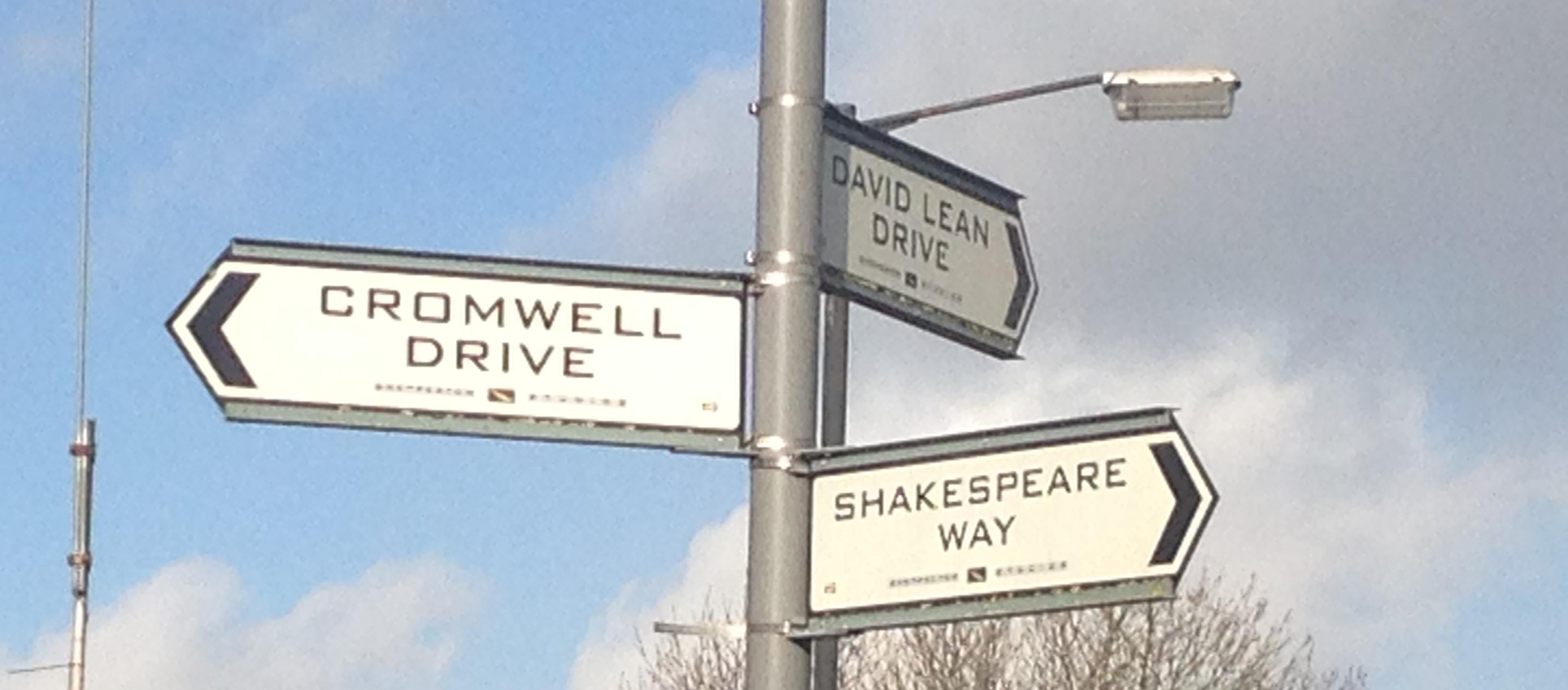
A street sign at Shepperton Studios

Despite the financial ups and downs of British Lion and the changing of hands, the studios remained active until the early 1970s. In 1969, the studios produced 27 films; by 1971 this number had fallen to seven. Production throughout the 1970s was erratic, reaching a low of two films by 1979. Among the problems faced by Shepperton Studios during this time was the desire of new British Lion director John Bentley to sell the grounds for housing, since redeveloping the land would have nearly doubled its value. A compromise was proposed, and in 1973 the area of the studios was reduced from 60 acres (24 ha) to 20 acres (8.1 ha).

The studios' 1970s credits include Kubrick's A Clockwork Orange and Jimmy Perry and David Croft's Dad's Army (both 1971), Richard Attenborough's Young Winston (1972) and Fred Zinnemann's The Day of the Jackal (1973). Also around this time, the rock group Led Zeppelin filmed some concert scenes at Shepperton that were used in their live concert film, "The Song Remains the Same". These scenes were used to fill gaps in footage of a Madison Square Garden concert from 1973.

In 1975, the studios were again transferred to new ownership and in spite of sparse production schedules served as the filming site of some high-budget productions, including Richard Donner's The Omen (1976), Franklin Schaffner's The Boys from Brazil (1978), Ridley Scott's Alien (1979), David Lynch's The Elephant Man (1980), Attenborough's Gandhi (1982), David Lean's A Passage to India (1984) and Attenborough's Cry Freedom (1987).

In 1978, rock band The Who filmed live concert scenes at Shepperton for their documentary The Kids Are Alright (1979). These turned out to be the band's final live performance with drummer Keith Moon, who died later that year.

In 1984, Shepperton Studios changed hands coming under the control of brothers John and Benny Lee, who renovated the studios but soon lost control as a result of the "Black Monday" of 1987, the 1988 Writers Guild of America strike and internal issues within their company, Lee International. Bankers Warburg Pincus acquired the studios, which became busy with the filming of TV shows including Thomas & Friends and its sister series, TUGS, as well as such films as Franco Zeffirelli's Hamlet (1990), Kevin Reynolds' Robin Hood: Prince of Thieves (1991) and Nicholas Hytner's The Madness of King George (1994). In 1995, the studios were purchased by a consortium headed by Ridley and Tony Scott, which led to an extensive renovation of the studios as well as the expansion and improvement of its grounds, and was also involved with the filming 101 Dalmatians in 1996.

In 2001, Shepperton Studios was sold to the Pinewood Group, which also owns Pinewood Studios in the UK, as well as Pinewood Studio Berlin in Germany, Pinewood Toronto Studios in Canada, Pinewood Indomina Studios in the Dominican Republic and Pinewood Iskandar Malaysia Studios in Malaysia.

In July 2019, Netflix announced that it would be opening a hub at the studios.

In November 2021, Netflix announced that it would extend its long-term deal with the studios. The studio's owner Pinewood Group also announced that the studios would expend approximately 1 million square feet of the new production space, with the overall studio set to comprise 17 sound stages.

In February 2022, Amazon Prime Video signed a multi-million pound long-term deal with the studios for exclusive use of new production facilities.

== Stages and locations ==
Shepperton Studios has 31 stages, ranging in size from 3,000 square feet (280 m^{2}) to 30,000 square feet (2,800 m^{2}), five of which are equipped with interior tanks for water and underwater filming. Although often described as the home of independent film and TV production in the UK, the studios have also served as a production base for big-budget films such as Captain America: The First Avenger (2011), the filming for which used eight of the fifteen stages. The British TV series Thomas & Friends was shot on the "T Stage" from 1984 to 2008, after which the live action models originally used were replaced with computer animation.

The nearby Little House and surrounding grounds have been used as a filming location for films such as The Omen (1976) and The Young Victoria (2009). The studios also have two large backlots, which were used to create two castle compounds for the film 47 Ronin.

In May 2026, Shepperton announced they had named one of the stages in honour of Dame Maggie Smith.

== See also ==
- List of productions filmed at Pinewood Group facilities – for a list of productions shot or produced at Shepperton.
