= Kimmins =

Kimmins is a surname of Scottish and Irish origin. Notable people with the surname include:

- Anthony Kimmins (1901–1964), British director, playwright, screenwriter, producer and actor, son of Charles and Grace Kimmins, brother of Brian Kimmins
- Brian Kimmins (1899–1979), British Army lieutenant-general, son of Charles and Grace Kimmins
- Charles William Kimmins (1856–1948), British educational psychologist
- Douglas Eric Kimmins (1905–1985), British entomologist
- Grace Kimmins (1870–1954), British writer
- Hamish Kimmins (1942–2021), Canadian forest ecologist
- Kenneth Kimmins (born 1941), American actor
- Liz Kimmins, Northern Irish politician
- Simon Kimmins (born 1930), British cricketer

== See also ==
- Kimmins, Tennessee
