= Garthwaite =

Garthwaite may refer to:

- Anna Maria Garthwaite (1688–1763), English textile designer
- Emily Garthwaite (born 1993), British photojournalist
- Peter Garthwaite (1909–2001), English forester
- Phil Garthwaite (born 1972), American broadcaster, farmer and politician
- Rosie Garthwaite (born 1980), English journalist
- Ryan Garthwaite (born 1998), Australian rules footballer
- Garthwaite baronets
