= Reginald Denny =

Reginald Denny may refer to:

- Reginald Denny (actor) (1891–1967), British actor
- Reginald Oliver Denny, truck driver beaten during the 1992 Los Angeles riots

== See also ==
- Reginald Denning, British Army staff officer and administrator
