= Muriel Powell (charity administrator) =

British charity administrator

Muriel Powell MBE (1889–1972), often referred to as Matron Powell, was the successor to Dame Grace Kimmins in the Chailey Heritage School and was the founder of Searchlight which continued the work of the Chailey Heritage School for students from age 15 into adulthood.

From 1924 until her resignation in 1933, Powell was Matron of the Chailey Heritage Marine Hospital, at Tide Mills, East Sussex.
