= Simon Kimmins =

English cricketer

Personal information
- Full name: Simon Edward Anthony Kimmins
- Born: 26 May 1930; Westminster, London
- Died: 1 February 2025 (aged 94)
- Batting: Right-handed
- Bowling: Right-arm medium
- Relatives: Anthony Kimmins (father); Charles Kimmins (grandfather); Grace Kimmins (grandmother)

Domestic team information
- Years: Team
- 1950–1953: Kent
- FC debut: 7 June 1950 Combined Services v Glamorgan
- Last FC: 8 July 1959 MCC v Cambridge University

Career statistics
Competition	First-class
Matches	16
Runs scored	563
Batting average	21.65
100s/50s	0/3
Top score	81
Balls bowled	1,981
Wickets	24
Bowling average	41.50
5 wickets in innings	1
10 wickets in match	0
Best bowling	5/42
Catches/stumpings	13/–
- Source: Cricinfo, 17 May 2025

Simon Edward Anthony Kimmins (26 May 1930 – 1 February 2025) was an English cricketer. He played for Kent County Cricket Club between 1950 and 1959, making a total of 16 appearances in first-class cricket matches.

Kimmins was born in London in 1930 and attended Charterhouse School where he played in the cricket XI. His father, Anthony Kimmins, was a playwright and film director who served in the Royal Navy during both World Wars.

Kimmins played four times for the Royal Navy in non-first-class matches whilst on National Service in 1950 and made his first-class cricket debut for the Combined Services team against Glamorgan in June 1950. He made his Kent debut later the same year and went on to make 11 further appearances for the county First XI during the 1951 season and two appearances for the Second XI in the Minor Counties Championship, one in 1952 and the last in 1953.

Kimmins played cricket into the 1960s, making first-class appearances for Free Foresters and MCC and touring India and the far-east with EW Swanton's XI in 1964. He died in February 2025 aged 94.
