= Ruth Marchant =

Dr Ruth Marchant
- Born: 9 April 1961; Birmingham
- Died: 12 December 2018 (aged 57)
- Education: University of Sussex; University of Portsmouth
- Occupations: Intermediary and forensic interviewer
- Children: 2

Dr. Ruth Marchant (April 1961 – December 2018) was an English intermediary for children and a forensic interviewer. She also co-founded Triangle, an independent organisation that provides specialist services, such as intermediary and investigative interviewing, to children and people with communication differences in the UK.

== Personal life and education ==
Marchant was born on the 9th of April, 1961 in Birmingham England. She was the daughter of a Baptist minister and a teacher, she grew up in Newham, East London. Before marrying her father, her mother's maiden name was Polity. Marchant has two daughters alive today named Amelia and James. She attended Ravenscroft Primary School, followed by Cumberland comprehensive. Marchant spent time at a children's home seeing first hand the effects of parental abuse, thus sparking her drive in a career centered around helping children.

Marchant studied developmental psychology at the University of Sussex, graduating in 1982.

In 2018, Marchant completed a PhD at the University of Portsmouth. Her thesis was titled Enabling Children’s Communication in Legal Contexts.

== Career ==
Marchant used her PhD degree alongside her own methods to train and educate numerous police officers, judges, childcare staff, paediatricians, and barristers. She then went on to work for multiple charities and organisations working with children, such as Save the Children and Chailey Heritage School. Towards the beginning of her career, Marchant helped children communicate with the justice system by setting up consultative groups. Marchant did so through special schools and through the NHS (National Health Service). Later, in 1997 Marchant became the co-founder of the organisation Triangle with occupational psychologist Mary Jones. Her work with children took her around much of England, stopping at Brighton, and then Lewes East Sussex. It was there in Lewes she met Jones. They both worked at Chailey Heritage centre which focused more on children with complex disabilities. The centre is now known as the Chailey Heritage Foundation.

Marchant was behind many changes in the English legal system, making it easier to work with children involved in legal proceedings. She was the first to use a tent for a child to sit in when giving evidence in court, and was behind the practice for barristers to move to the live link room for cross-examination of children.

She has also co-written articles on responding to very young children when they may be at risk, non-verbal communication with children giving evidence, safe-guarding disabled children, and communicating with very young children giving evidence in legal proceedings.

Through her organisation, Triangle, she also provided support for children involved in legal proceedings. Her directorial position at Triangle included working as a forensic interviewer, intermediary and expert witness. As an intermediary she provided impartial recommendations to HMCTS (court-appointed intermediaries) about a child's specific communication needs and outlined the steps needed to achieve them.

While developing Triangle's training, Marchant and her colleagues came up with the Opening Doors analogy. This analogy is a set of ideas/guidance's in therapy that allow a provider to figure out when a child might be showing or telling that they are at risk. It focuses on the interaction with the child and what to do in that moment, instead of recording or passing on the information to someone else. This research has confirmed that children rely a lot more on unspoken communication than adults do. The ability to understand this allows for better guidance about how adults should respond to initial concerns of children. Marchant's work in this area allowed intermediaries including herself better help children in legal proceedings.

Other work that Marchant has done focuses on the age of children and their ability to contribute to evidence in the criminal justice system. Marchant conducted research on children under the age of five to see if they can reliably participate as witnesses in the English criminal justice system. She found that very young children are capable of providing meaningful and reliable evidence. However, the effectiveness of a child's participation relies heavily on how adults conduct interviews and courtroom procedures . Marchant draws the conclusion, that the main barrier of having young children take the stand is not their competence level, but it's the ability of the professional to meet the developmental needs of the child.

== Death ==
Marchant resigned from her directorial position at Triangle on the 10th of December 2018. Just two days later on the 12th, Marchant died from cancer at age 57 in Brighton, Sussex. Her family adopted for a more private funeral and the type of cancer of which she had was not publicly announced. Both her parents and siblings were alive at the time of her death.
