= General Forster =

General Forster or Förster may refer to:

- Albert Forster (1902–1952), German SS lieutenant general
- Helmuth Förster (1889–1965), German Luftwaffe general
- John Forster (British Army officer) (1856–1938), British Army major general
- William Forster (British Army officer) (1798–1879), British Army general
- Otto-Wilhelm Förster (1885–1966), German Wehrmacht general

== See also ==
- James Forrester (politician) (1937–2011), North Carolina Air National Guard brigadier general
- Michael Forrester (British Army officer) (1917–2006), British Army major general
