= Helen Parkhurst =

American educator, author, and lecturer

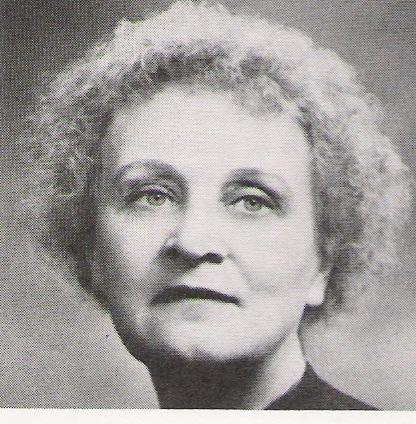
- Parkhurst c. 1930
- Born: March 8, 1886; Durand, Wisconsin, United States
- Died: June 1, 1973 (aged 87); New Milford, Connecticut
- Education: Wisconsin State Teachers College at River Falls (BA), Yale University (MA)
- Occupations: Educator, television and radio host
- Known for: Creator of the Dalton Plan and founder of the Dalton School

Helen Parkhurst (March 8, 1886 – June 1, 1973) was an American educator, author, lecturer, the originator of the Dalton Plan, founder of the Dalton School and host of Child's World with Helen Parkhurst on ABC Television Network. Parkhurst took her cues from developmental psychologist Jean Piaget and education reformers such as John Dewey and Horace Mann, producing a progressive education philosophy emphasizing the development of the "whole child".

== Early life and education ==
Born in Durand, Wisconsin, she graduated from Wisconsin State Teachers College at River Falls in 1907, studied at the universities of Rome and Munich as well as with Maria Montessori and was awarded her M.A. in 1943 from Yale University. She taught briefly in Wisconsin, moved to Tacoma, Washington, in 1909, and returned to Wisconsin as the director of the department for the training of primary teachers at Stevens Point Normal School from 1913 until 1915. For a time, Parkhurst served as director of all Montessori schools in the United States.

== Career ==
In 1920 she gained a disciple when college founder Belle Rennie visited from the UK. Rennie became an evangelist for the approach and she created the Dalton Association in Britain.

After further work with Montessori in Rome, Parkhurst wrote several books like Education on the Dalton Plan (1922), Work Rhythms in Education (1935), Exploring the Child's World (1951), Growing Pains (1962) and Undertow (1963) and had her own national radio and television programs. Parkhurst hosted Child's World, a children's educational program on ABC Radio Network in New York City. In 1932 Belle Rennie published The Triumph of the Dalton Plan with the British educational psychologist Charles William Kimmins.

Parkhurst was a 1948 recipient of a Radio - Television Critics Award and a 1949 recipient of the 13th American Exhibition of Educational Radio Programs Award.

Parkhurst was the author of Education on the Dalton Plan, which was published in 58 languages; Exploring the Child's World, with an introduction by Aldous Huxley, and Growing Pains, a book about teenagers. Parkhurst was named one of the 100 Educators of All Time. Parkhurst was decorated by the Queen of Italy, Empress of Japan, and Queen of the Netherlands. Maria Montessori best summarized Parkhurst's career by stating, "Her intelligent activity is truly rare and precious." Eleanor Roosevelt greatly admired Parkhurst's work and played a significant role in expanding the population and resources of her school.

== Legacy ==
Parkhurst's influence has spread across the globe, with schools in the Netherlands, England, Australia, Japan and others adopting the Dalton Plan of education. The Helen Parkhurst Exhibit at the Pepin County Museum traces the life and legacy of Parkhurst. There is a "Helen Parkhurst Dalton School" in Rotterdam and a Parkhurst Lecture Hall at UW-Stevens Point.
