= Brian Kimmins =

British military commander

Lieutenant-General Sir Brian Kimmins KBE CB DL
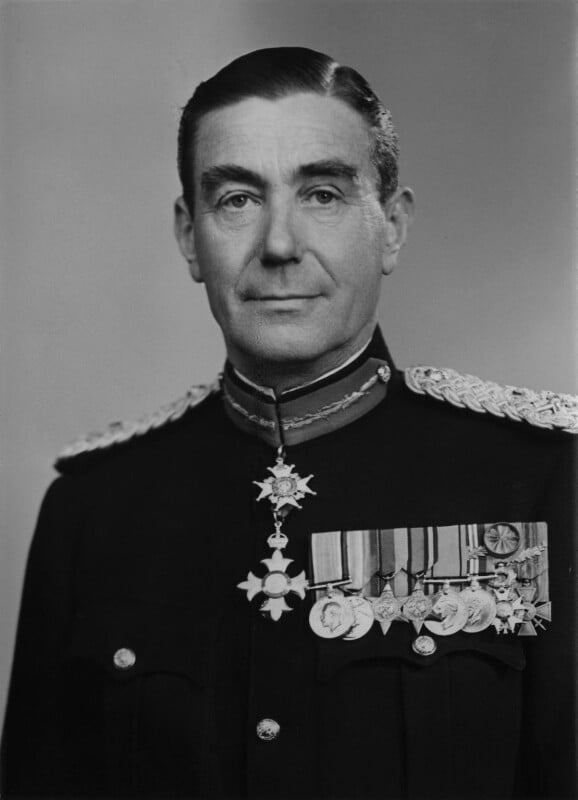
- Kimmins in 1953
- Born: 30 July 1899; Hendon, Middlesex, England
- Died: 15 November 1979 (aged 80); Taunton, Somerset, England
- Relatives: Charles William Kimmins (father); Grace Kimmins (mother); Anthony Kimmins (brother)
- Military career
- Allegiance: United Kingdom
- Branch: British Army
- Service years: 1917–1958
- Rank: Lieutenant-General
- Service number: 1294
- Units: Royal Field Artillery; Royal Artillery
- Commands: Northern Ireland District (1955–1958); 44th (Home Counties) Division (1950–1952)
- Conflicts: First World War; Second World War
- Awards: Knight Commander of the Order of the British Empire; Companion of the Order of the Bath; Mentioned in Despatches; Legion of Honour (France); Croix de Guerre (France)

Lieutenant-General Sir Brian Charles Hannam Kimmins, KBE, CB, DL (30 July 1899 – 15 November 1979) was a British Army officer who served as the General Officer Commanding Northern Ireland District.

== Military career ==
Kimmins was born in Hendon, Middlesex (now North London), the son of psychologist Charles William Kimmins and Dame Grace Kimmins. He was the older brother of Anthony Kimmins.

After graduating from the Royal Military Academy, Woolwich on 28 September 1917, Kimmins was commissioned as a second lieutenant into the Royal Field Artillery of the British Army, during the latter phases of the First World War.

After the war he served in India and Egypt and became aide-de-camp to the High Commissioner for Egypt and the Sudan on 7 November 1928. He relinquished this assignment in October 1929 and became adjutant at the Royal Military Academy, Woolwich, in 1930 and brigade major for the 49th (West Riding) Infantry Division's 147th Infantry Brigade in 1935. He then attended the Staff College, Camberley from 1938 to 1939.

Kimmins served in the Second World War, initially as a General Staff Officer with the British Expeditionary Force in France before becoming an instructor at the Staff College in 1940, and with it came the acting rank of lieutenant colonel (which was made temporary in November). He was then, after being promoted to the acting rank of colonel and brigadier in December 1941, appointed Deputy Director of Military Training at the War Office in London from December 1941 until May 1942 when he became a Brigadier on the General Staff of Southern Command from May until November. He became Commander, Royal Artillery for the Guards Armoured Division in 1943 and Director of Plans for South East Asia Command in 1944. He was finally Assistant Chief of Staff at the Headquarters of the Supreme Allied Commander South East Asia in 1945. On 24 February 1945, towards the end of the war, he was promoted to the rank of major general.

After the Second World War Kimmins became Chief of Staff at Headquarters Combined Operations in 1946 and Director of Quartering at the War Office in 1947. He was appointed General Officer Commanding Home Counties District and GOC 44th (Home Counties) Infantry Division in 1950 and Director of the Territorial Army and Cadets in 1952. His last appointment was as General Officer Commanding Northern Ireland District in 1955, which saw him promoted to lieutenant general. He then retired from the army, after over forty years of military service, in August 1958.

He died at the age of 80 the Somerset Nuffield Hospital in Taunton on 15 November 1979, leaving a wife and three children.

== Bibliography ==
- At Your Service – a belated autobiography of Lieutenant General Sir Brian Kimmins KBE CB DL, Foreword by Field Marshal Lord Guthrie GCB LVO OBE DL

Military offices
Preceded by Philip Gregson-Ellis	GOC 44th (Home Counties) Division; 1950–1952	Succeeded by Otway Herbert
Preceded by Sir John Woodall	GOC British Army in Northern Ireland; 1955–1958	Succeeded by Sir Douglas Packard
