= Child's World =

American radio children's series (1947–1949)

- Genre: Children's, talk
- Country of origin: United States
- Language: English
- TV adaptations: Children's World
- Hosted by: Helen Parkhurst
- Created by: Helen Parkhurst
- Original release: October 26, 1947 – June 27, 1949
- No. of series: 2

Child's World is an American children's radio series that was broadcast on ABC October 26, 1947 - June 27, 1949. More than 5,000 children were interviewed on the award-winning program. A television series was adapted from it, and discussions from it formed the basis of a book.

== Background ==
Educator Helen Parkhurst created Child's World, the goal of which was to "educate parents through the wisdom of their own children". For two years prior to the show's premiere she interviewed children about their personal problems and recorded their responses, accumulating more than 200 recordings in that process. The interviewees came from parochial, private, and public schools and from urban, suburban, and rural settings. Those experiences indicated that a formal structure would inhibit freshness and spontaneity, so she chose to use unrehearsed discussions on the broadcasts.

== Format ==
Parkhurst hosted the program in a way that was "strictly non-parental, neither admonishing nor lecturing". Each episode had a group of children gathered in Parkhurst's apartment in New York to talk spontaneously about topics selected by Parkhurst. The setting enabled participants to talk "without consciousness of a listening audience" and with "none of the tenseness or formatlity of a studio program".

Participants ranging in age from 4 to 14 were usually picked from lists submitted by schools in New York, with six to nine appearing in an episode. They came "from all races, nationalities, and economic backgrounds" and ranged "from dead-end kids and juvenile delinquents to the precocious and the average". They received no prizes for their participation. Topics of discussions included allowances, friends, lying, older siblings, privileges, secrets, babies, death, God, jealousy, teachers, and playing hooky,

Lawrence K. Frank, director of the Caroline Zachry Institute of Human Development, wrote a commentary after each broadcast that "analyzes the children's conversations, stresses points which tend to make conflicts between children and adults, and suggests ways in which adults might treat similar situations which arise between them and children." Each commentary was available free to anyone who sent a request for it to ABC in New York City.

ABC received an average of 400 letters per week in response to episodes of Child's World, with some episodes that contained "particularly exciting discussions" prompting much larger mail responses.

== Production ==
Before each broadcast, the children participating spent a few minutes in a room by themselves "to gain confidence". From there they went to Parkhust's dining room, where they stood around a circular railing. Each stood shoeless ("both for comfort and so that toes can be wiggled without creating odd sound effects.") Once they were in place, Parkhurst named the topic to be discusses, and the children began to speak freely into the microphones. A wire recorder preserved the children's comments for use on the air.

Child's World initially was broadcast on Sundays at 7 p.m. Eastern Time. In March 1948 it was moved to Thursdays at 10 p.m. E. T. In March 1949 it was moved to Mondays at 9:30 p.m. E. T. The program was sustaining.

== Critical response ==
A review in The New York Times said that Child's World "represents the most direct, specific and, quite frequently, humorous documentation of children's views" that were likely to be broadcast, noting that children on the program were "heard fairly and honestly and without exploitation". The only flaw mentioned in the review was Parkhurst's lack of flexibility in talking with the participants. It said that she sometimes followed "what sounds like a predetermined pattern" rather than adapting her questions to the children's comments.

Radio Album magazine called Child's World "unique among programs featuring small fry" because Parkhurst "neither exploits the children nor plays them for laughs", and Life magazine wrote that it was "the most fascinating of juvenile programs".

Media critic John Crosby wrote, "the kids are astonishlingly literate in these discussions and painfully frank, indicating that Miss Parkhurst is something of a genius at opening up children".

Will Jones commented in the Minneapolis Morning Tribune that Parkhurst "seemed to guide the discussion with a bit too heavy a hand", but even so, "the program had a candid, refreshing quality".

== Recognition ==
The Radio-Television Critics Circle of New York recognized Child's World in May 1948 as an outstanding program development. In February 1949 the program was one of four recipients of radio awards announced by the National Conference of Christians and Jews. The awards were based on "contributions to mutual understanding and respect among all the American people". Ohio State University's Institute for Education by Radio in May 1949 designated Child's World for special recognition in the Public Affairs Programs, Talks and Discussions category of its annual awards. In January 1950, the New York listening post of the Peabody Awards included the show as one of three programs recommended for an award in the Youth category based on the way the program interpreted and presented problems of young people and parents.

== Use in higher education ==
Some colleges and universities, including Columbia University, New York University, the University of Southern California, and Yale University, required students in certain classes in education and philosophy to listen to Child's World. In addition to hearing episodes as they were broadcast, students and educators sometimes used recordings of episodes during classes. Bessie Lee Gambrill, associate professor of elementary education at Yale, said that graduate students of child development were interested in "Miss Parkhurst's unusual skill in getting children to talk freely about their reactions to experiences". She added that classes used recordings as focal points for discussions of topics. Students in two disciplines at the University of Washington studied the program for different purposes. Those in the Graduate School of Social Work used transcriptions "for more intensive study" in preparation for their future work with children. Students of programming and production in the university's radio department studied the recordings "as an example of a successful ad-lib discussion series".

== Television ==
A TV version of Child's World debuted on ABC on November 1, 1948 with a format similar to that of the radio program. It ended on April 27, 1949. Initially it was broadcast on Tuesdays from 7:30 to 7:45 p.m. Eastern Time. In January 1949 it was moved to Wednesdays from 7:15 to 7:30 p.m. E. T.

== Book ==
In 1951 Appleton-Century-Crofts published Parkhurst's book Exploring the Child's World, which drew "heavily upon actual conversations in the broadcasts". The book also included Parkhurst's interpretations and comments related to the discussions.
