= William Shelford =

William ("Bill") Thomas Cornelius Shelford (born 1943) is a Deputy Lieutenant for East Sussex. He was the 2009/2010 High Sheriff of East Sussex. He was previously the Senior Partner of CMS Cameron McKenna and before that he was a specialist in Property Law. He is Chairman of Chailey Heritage School and a Trustee of Chailey Heritage Foundation.

He was educated at Eton College and Christ Church, Oxford where he studied Law.
