= Keep Fit =

- Directed by: Anthony Kimmins
- Written by: Anthony Kimmins; Austin Melford
- Produced by: Basil Dean; Jack Kitchin
- Starring: George Formby; Kay Walsh; Guy Middleton; Evelyn Roberts
- Cinematography: John W. Boyle; Gordon Dines; Ronald Neame
- Edited by: Ernest Aldridge
- Music by: Ernest Irving
- Production company: Associated Talking Pictures
- Distributed by: ABFD
- Release date: 18 August 1937
- Running time: 82 minutes
- Country: United Kingdom
- Language: English

Keep Fit is a 1937 British comedy film directed by Anthony Kimmins and starring George Formby, Kay Walsh and Guy Middleton. It was written by Kimmins and Austin Melford.

== Synopsis ==
George Formby again plays his working class underdog, gormless, gullible, indefatigable and triumphant hero. A weakling, Formby's character overcomes obstacles to beat a corrupt rival in the boxing ring. He plays a scrawny barber's assistant who, in response to the keep fit fad sweeping through Britain at the time, dreams of a better physique, and sings of it in the catchy "Biceps, Muscle and Brawn". He falls in love with a beautiful manicurist, and competes for her affections with a muscle bound thug. The manicurist is more attracted to the brute until the barber can prove that he is a crook, and defeat him in the boxing ring.

== Cast ==
- George Formby as George Green
- Kay Walsh as Joan Allen
- Guy Middleton as Hector Kent
- George Benson as Ernie Gill
- Gus McNaughton as "Echo" publicity manager
- Evelyn Roberts as Mr Barker
- Aubrey Mallalieu as magistrate
- Edmund Breon as Sir Augustus Marks
- Hal Gordon as reporter
- Hal Walters as racing tough
- C. Denier Warren as editor
- Edgar Driver as boat hire owner
- Leo Franklyn as racing tough
- Robert Nainby as judge at the gym
- Julian Vedey as hairdressing dept head
- Jack Vyvian as boat hire man
- D.J. Williams as editor of The Gazette

== Critical reception ==
=== Box office ===
Kine Weekly reported the film as a "winner" at the British box office in February 1938.

=== Critical ===
The Monthly Film Bulletin wrote: "The film is boisterous, unconventional and light-hearted, and is played at a smart pace from start to finish. There is the added spice of laconic dialogue and some original situations. George Formby is excellent in the lead; George Benson, playing the ingenuous Ernie Gill, the helpful friend, has a distinctive personality and the teamwork is unusually good. Good entertainment in the Chaplin tradition."

Kine Weekly wrote: "Some of the gags, although presneted on a most ambitious scale, lack spontaneity, and some are obvious, but all recognise the value of simplicity, and it is the sly cultivation of the homely touch, as much as the star's goofy versatility and personality, that contributes confidently to the film's happy augury. The clean, exhilarating fun is wisely aimed at the masses, and with the star's pull to give it direction, it shculd score a bull at the box office. It is George Formby's best."

Picturegoer wrote: "George Formby has proved himself one of our most popular comedians, and in this crazy extravaganza ... he is on the top of his form. It is all very simple and ingenuous, but it is apparently just those two qualities which have endeared him to such a wide public."

Picture Show wrote: "This is a riotously funny skit on health and fitness campaigns, and with George Formby's lanky form and woolly headed ways of working things out, it could not have been bettered in its star, although the direction may at times be a little too careful to obtain spontaneously funny results."

Leslie Halliwell wrote "Good star vehicle with snappy songs and fast comedy scenes."

In The Radio Times Guide to Films Dick Fiddy gave the film 3/5 stars, writing: "It's hard now to imagine that a toothy-grinned, ukelele-strumming comic with a broad Lancashire accent could be a superstar but George Formby certainly was. A huge box-office draw in Britain during the 1930s and 1940s, Formby's saucy wit and frantic comic style proved a great tonic to wartime audiences. This movie finds the star in fine form, belting out songs and throwing himself into comedy routines, as a weedy barber forced to compete with a more athletic rival. Add a dash of romance and the unmasking of a thief and you've got all the ingredients for a first-rate Formby film."

Sky Movies wrote that Formby "was at his British top box-office peak when this comedy was made. ... It's a bouncy, confidently made comedy that's fun throughout and pretty hilarious in its boxing-ring conclusion".

== See also ==
- List of boxing films
