= Vernon Erskine-Crum =

British Army general

Lieutenant-General Vernon Erskine-Crum CIE MC
- Born: 11 December 1918; Calcutta, British India
- Died: 17 March 1971 (aged 52); Belfast, Northern Ireland
- Military career
- Allegiance: United Kingdom
- Branch: British Army
- Service years: 1940–1971
- Rank: Lieutenant-General
- Service number: 130301
- Unit: Scots Guards
- Commands: Northern Ireland (1969–1971); 4th Division (1967–1969); 4th Guards Brigade Group (1963–1967)
- Conflicts: Second World War; The Troubles
- Awards: Companion of the Order of the Indian Empire; Military Cross

Lieutenant-General Vernon Forbes Erskine-Crum, CIE, MC (11 December 1918 – 17 March 1971) was a British Army officer, who briefly served as General Officer Commanding in Northern Ireland during the early period of the Troubles.

== Regimental career ==
Erskine-Crum was born in Calcutta, the younger son of Sir William Erskine Crum. He was educated at Eton and New College, Oxford. In 1940 he was commissioned into the Scots Guards, and served with the regiment during the Second World War. He won a Military Cross (MC) during the North-West European campaign in 1944.

== Indian service ==
After training at the Staff College in 1945, Erskine-Crum was promoted to temporary lieutenant colonel and posted to the staff in South-East Asia, arriving just after the Japanese surrender. He served as the Conference Secretary to Lord Mountbatten, a position he held for just over a year before returning to regimental duty in England, commanding a company of the 2nd Battalion Scots Guards.

After six weeks, Erskine-Crum was recalled by Mountbatten, who had been appointed Viceroy of India, and again served as his Conference Secretary until he left India in 1948. For his services, he was appointed a Companion of the Order of the Indian Empire on 30 December 1947.

== Senior Command ==
On returning from India, Erskine-Crum was appointed as the regimental adjutant of the Scots Guards, and then a succession of other administrative posts; adjutant of the Royal Military Academy Sandhurst, brigade major of the Household Brigade, commandant of the Guards Depot, and Assistant Adjutant General of the London District.

On 9 February 1962, Erskine-Crum was promoted colonel, and from 1962 to 1963 was Secretary of the Joint Planning Staff. In 1963 he was appointed to command 4th Guards Brigade Group, promoted to brigadier on 9 February 1966, and appointed to command the 4th Division in 1967.

Erskine-Crum was appointed co-ordinator of the Imperial Defence College on 15 October 1969, and Chief Army Instructor there on 1 February 1970. Following this position, he was appointed General Officer Commanding and Director of Operations in Northern Ireland on 4 February 1971, to replace Lieutenant General Ian Freeland, but he suffered a heart attack on 16 February and was relieved by Lieutenant General Harry Tuzo on 2 March.

== Death ==
Erskine-Crum died a month after his heart attack, in hospital, on 17 March 1971, aged 52. His brief spell in Northern Ireland witnessed the escalation of tensions, as well as the first death of a British soldier, Gunner Robert Curtis, on 6 February.

== Family ==
Erskine-Crum married Rosemary Douglas, the daughter of Brigadier Sir Douglas Dawson and Lady Aimée Dawson in 1948. They had one son, Brigadier Douglas Erskine Crum.

Military offices
Preceded by Michael Forrester	General Officer Commanding 4th Division; 1967–1969	Succeeded by David Fraser
Preceded by Ian Freeland	General Officer Commanding the British Army in Northern Ireland; 1971	Succeeded by Harry Tuzo
