= John Woodall (British Army officer) =

British Army general

Lieutenant-General Sir John Woodall KCMG KBE CB MC
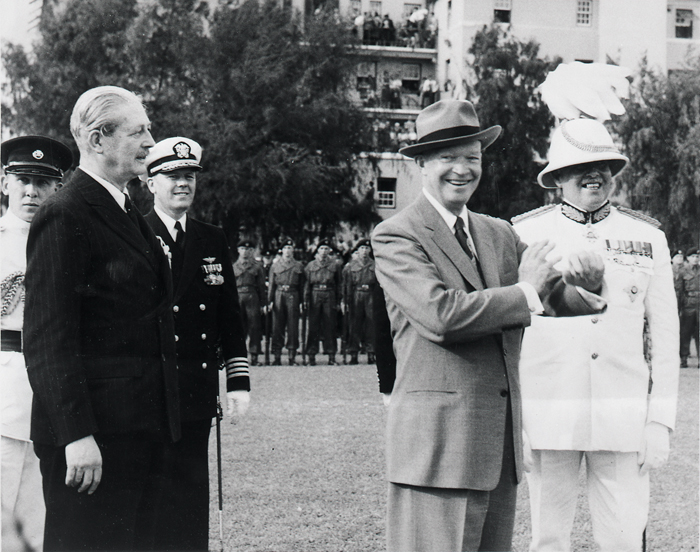
- Sir John Woodall (right) with US President Dwight D. Eisenhower and British Prime Minister Harold Macmillan, March 1957.

Governor of Bermuda
- In office 1955–1959
- Monarch: Elizabeth II
- Preceded by: Sir Alexander Hood
- Succeeded by: Sir Julian Gascoigne

Personal details
- Born: 19 April 1897
- Died: 7 May 1985 (aged 88)
- Military career
- Allegiance: United Kingdom
- Branch: British Army
- Service years: 1915–1955
- Rank: Lieutenant-General
- Service number: 1490
- Units: Royal Garrison Artillery; Royal Artillery
- Commands: Northern Ireland District
- Conflicts: First World War; Gallipoli Campaign; Second World War; Battle of France
- Awards: Knight Commander of the Order of St Michael and St George; Knight Commander of the Order of the British Empire; Companion of the Order of the Bath; Military Cross
- Other work: Governor of Bermuda (1955–59)

Lieutenant-General Sir John Dane Woodall, KCMG, KBE, CB, MC (19 April 1897 − 7 May 1985) was a senior British Army officer who served as General Officer Commanding Northern Ireland District from 1952 to 1955. He was Governor of Bermuda from 1955 to 1959.

== Military career ==
After attending the Royal Military Academy, Woolwich, Woodall was commissioned into the Royal Garrison Artillery in July 1915. In the First World War, he served on Gallipoli and was a Staff Captain in Salonika and the Black Sea. He was awarded the Military Cross in June 1917.

After the war, Woodall became Deputy Assistant Adjutant General for the Black Sea Area before undertaking the same role in Turkey. He attended the Staff College, Camberley in 1930, and in 1937 he became an instructor in Gunnery at Northern Command and in 1932 he transferred to become a Staff Officer, Royal Artillery at Western Command. He then went on to be Brigade Major for the Royal Artillery in Malaya in 1934 and then an instructor at the RAF Staff College in 1938.

Woodall served in the Second World War, initially as a General Staff Officer with the British Expeditionary Force and then as a Brigadier on the General Staff. He was appointed a Regimental Commander in the Royal Artillery in 1943 and Senior Air Staff Officer at RAF Army Cooperation Command, before becoming Deputy Director of Staff Duties at the War Office in 1944. During his time working with the Royal Air Force he co-authored the "Wane-Woodall Report", which advocated a specially trained and equipped unit for close support, a series of liaison officers, a command post and a communications system.

After the Second World War, Woodall was appointed Director of Manpower at the War Office before moving on to be Vice Adjutant-General to the Forces in 1949. He became General Officer Commanding (GOC) Northern Ireland in 1952 and Governor and Commander-in-Chief of Bermuda in 1955.

Military offices
Preceded by Sir Reginald Denning	General Officer Commanding the British Army in Northern Ireland; 1952–1955	Succeeded by Sir Brian Kimmins
