= Headquarters Northern Ireland =

Coordinates: 54°31′27″N 06°3′6″W

HQ Northern Ireland
- Active: 1922–2009
- Country: United Kingdom
- Branch: British Army
- Type: Command
- Garrison/HQ: Thiepval Barracks, Lisburn

HQ Northern Ireland was the formation responsible for the British Army in and around Northern Ireland. It was established in 1922 and disbanded, replaced by a brigade-level Army Reserve formation, 38 (Irish) Brigade, in 2009.

== History ==
Ireland was partitioned in mid-1921. On 7 December 1922, the day after the establishment of the Irish Free State, the Parliament of Northern Ireland resolved to address King George V to opt out of the Irish Free State.

The same year (1922), the first General Officer Commanding, Northern Ireland District was appointed, Major General Sir Archibald Cameron. His headquarters was established at Victoria Barracks, Belfast; he served until 1925.

During the Second World War the role of the District was enhanced from internal security to that of combatting any threat of invasion from the Republic of Ireland. In June 1940, VI Corps was formed to control the British forces based in Northern Ireland. The following month, it was transformed into HQ British Troops in Ireland (BTI, later renamed HQ British Troops in Northern Ireland or BTNI). Northern Ireland District was made responsible for local defence, and under certain conditions would control at least one division based there. However, BTNI became responsible for the overall defence of the territory and if needed would control forces assigned to Plan W, to counter a German invasion of the Republic of Ireland. The British Army's presence reached a peak of four divisions and generally maintained this strength (through the use of American troops after 1942) for most of the war. BTNI was disbanded at the end of the war, leaving Northern Ireland District as the sole command. The status district was upgraded to Command, under the leadership of Lieutenant-General Sir John Hackett, in 1961.

With the emergence of the Troubles, which started in Northern Ireland in the late 1960s, the role of HQ Northern Ireland increased substantially as it took responsibility for "assisting in the defeat of terrorism and the maintenance of public order" and by 1972 it had 27,000 troops under its command.

On 31 July 1972, Operation Motorman was launched, the biggest British military operation since the Suez Crisis of 1956 and the biggest in Ireland since the Irish War of Independence. It aimed to eradicate the 'no-go zones' that had built up in several areas across Northern Ireland. In the days before 31 July, about 4,000 extra troops were brought into Northern Ireland. Almost 22,000 soldiers were involved, including 27 infantry and two armoured battalions, aided by 5,300 soldiers from the local Ulster Defence Regiment (UDR). Several Centurion AVRE demolition vehicles, derived from the Centurion tank and fitted with bulldozer blades, were used. They were the only heavy armoured vehicles to be deployed operationally by the British Army in Northern Ireland during the Troubles. The tanks had been transported to Northern Ireland on board the amphibious landing ship HMS Fearless, and were operated with their turrets traversed to the rear and main guns covered by tarpaulins.

On 30 January 2006 the Secretary of State for Defence announced to the House of Commons that 19 Light Brigade, then stationed at Catterick, would be re-roling into a light brigade and relocating to Scotland and Northern Ireland. On 10 May 2006 it was further announced that "in addition to the HQ and other units of 19 Light Brigade that we expect to relocate to Northern Ireland in 2007 and 2008, a new and non-deployable regional brigade headquarters will form at Thiepval Barracks, Lisburn. The current 107 (Ulster) Brigade, based at Ballymena, will merge on 15 December this year into HQ 39 Infantry Brigade, which will itself be replaced by the new regional brigade headquarters, 38th (Irish) Brigade under the command of the 2nd Division, on 1 August 2007".

On 6 August 2007 HQ Northern Ireland and 38 (Irish) Brigade combined to create a single transitional headquarters with a two star General Officer Commanding. At the same time the British military presence in the Province was reduced to about 5,000 troops.

On 1 January 2009 the name of the formation changed to 38 (Irish) Brigade and HQ Northern Ireland was dissolved with residual regional functions being migrated to HQ 2 Division in Edinburgh.

Other services had a smaller 'footprint' in the province during the Troubles. The RAF's presence in Northern Ireland was based at RAF Aldergrove, and 230 Squadron was based there for many years, among other units. The Royal Navy no longer maintain a regular presence in Northern Ireland waters with the disbandment of the Northern Ireland Squadron. The Royal Navy's main presence is HMS Hibernia, which serves as the HQ of the Royal Naval Reserve's Ulster Division.

== Orders of battle ==
=== Northern Ireland District Organization in 1939 ===
Before the start of the Second World War, the British Army in Northern Ireland was known as "Northern Ireland District". It controlled many units including:

- Headquarters – Belfast
  - Regular Troops
    - Northern Ireland District Signal Company, Royal Corps of Signals – Belfast
    - 2nd Battalion, The South Wales Borderers – Derry
    - 1st Battalion, The East Lancashire Regiment – Holywood
    - 2nd Battalion, The Northamptonshire Regiment – Ballykinler
    - 2nd Battalion, The Royal Sussex Regiment – Belfast
    - Commander Royal Artillery, Northern Ireland District
      - Belfast Fire Command – Belfast
    - Royal Inniskilling Fusiliers Depot – Omagh
    - The Royal Ulster Rifles Depot – Armagh
  - Territorial Army
    - 188th (Antrim) Independent Heavy Battery, Royal Artillery – Belfast
    - Antrim Fortress Royal Engineers – Belfast
  - The Supplementary Reserve
    - North Irish Horse – Belfast
    - 3rd Anti-Aircraft Brigade
      - Headquarters – Belfast
      - 3rd (Ulster) Searchlight Regiment, Royal Artillery (Belfast)
      - 8th (Belfast) Anti-Aircraft Regiment, RA
      - 9th (Derry) Anti-Aircraft Regiment, Royal Artillery
  - Other Units
    - 26th Transport Company, Royal Army Service Corps – Belfast
    - 53rd Transport Company, Royal Army Service Corps – Belfast
    - 54th Transport Company, Royal Army Service Corps – Derry
    - 15th Field Hospital Company, Royal Army Medical Corps – Holywood
    - Northern Ireland District, Royal Army Ordnance Corps – Carrickfergus
    - Northern Ireland District, Royal Army Pay Corps – Belfast

=== HQ Northern Ireland formations, December 1989 ===
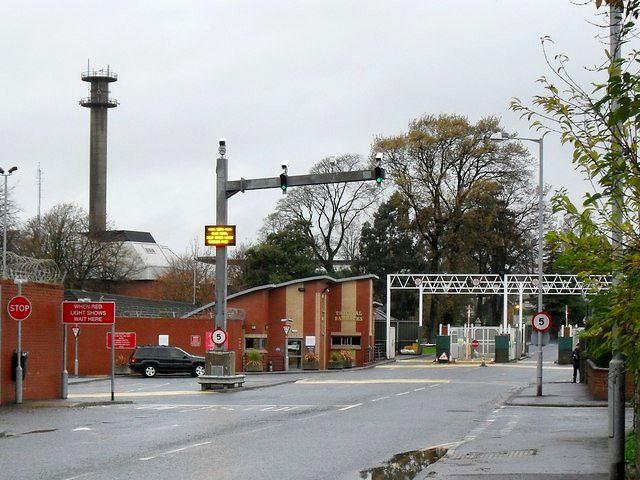
Thiepval Barracks, Lisburn, command headquarters

In December 1989 the following units were based in Northern Ireland under command of HQ Northern Ireland:

- Headquarters Northern Ireland, Lisburn, covering Northern Ireland
  - 3rd Infantry Brigade, Armagh
    - 1st Battalion, Worcestershire and Sherwood Foresters Regiment, Omagh
    - 2nd Battalion, Ulster Defence Regiment, County Armagh
    - 3rd Battalion, Ulster Defence Regiment, County Down
    - 11th Battalion, Ulster Defence Regiment, Craigavon
  - 8th Infantry Brigade, Derry
    - 1st Battalion, Gloucestershire Regiment
    - 4th (v) Battalion, Royal Irish Rangers, Portadown
    - 4th Battalion, Ulster Defence Regiment, County Fermanagh
    - 5th Battalion, Ulster Defence Regiment, County Londonderry
    - 6th Battalion, Ulster Defence Regiment, County Tyrone
    - 8th Battalion, Ulster Defence Regiment, County Tyrone
  - 39th Infantry Brigade, Lisburn
    - 3rd Battalion, Parachute Regiment
    - 1st Battalion, Royal Welch Fusiliers
    - 5th Battalion, Royal Irish Rangers (TA), Armagh
    - 1st/9th Battalion, Ulster Defence Regiment, County Down
    - 3rd Battalion, Ulster Defence Regiment, County Down
    - 7th/10th Battalion, Ulster Defence Regiment, Belfast
  - 655 Squadron AAC, Aldergrove
  - 1 Flight AAC, Aldergrove

== General Officers Commanding Northern Ireland ==
General Officers Commanding have included:
Northern Ireland District

- General Sir Archibald Cameron 1922–1925
- General Sir Felix Ready 1926–1929
- General Sir Arthur Wauchope 1929–1931
- Major-General Sir Eric Girdwood 1931–1935
- Major-General James Cooke-Collis 1935–1938
- Major-General Robert Pollok 1938–1940
- Major-General Hubert Huddleston 1940
- Major-General Ridley Pakenham-Walsh 1940–1941
- Major-General Vivian Majendie 1941–1943
- Major-General Alan Cunningham 1943–1944
- Major-General Gerard Bucknall 1944–1948
- Major-General Ouvry Roberts 1948–1949
- Lieutenant-General Sir Reginald Denning 1949–1952
- Lieutenant-General Sir John Woodall 1952–1955
- Lieutenant-General Sir Brian Kimmins 1955–1958
- Lieutenant-General Sir Douglas Packard 1959–1961

Northern Ireland Command

- Lieutenant-General Sir John Hackett 1961–1963
- Lieutenant-General Sir Richard Anderson 1963–1965
- Lieutenant-General Sir Desmond Fitzpatrick 1965–1966
- Lieutenant-General Sir Ian Harris 1966–1969
- Lieutenant-General Sir Ian Freeland 1969–1971
- Lieutenant-General Vernon Erskine-Crum 1971
- General Sir Harry Tuzo 1971–1973
- General Sir Frank King 1973–1975
- Lieutenant-General Sir David House 1975–1977
- General Sir Timothy Creasey 1977–1979
- General Sir Richard Lawson 1979–1982
- Lieutenant-General Sir Robert Richardson 1982–1985
- General Sir Robert Pascoe 1985–1988
- General Sir John Waters 1988–1990
- General Sir John Wilsey 1990–1993
- General Sir Roger Wheeler 1993–1996
- General Sir Rupert Smith 1996–1998
- Lieutenant General Sir Hew Pike 1998–2000
- Lieutenant General Sir Alistair Irwin 2000–2003
- Lieutenant General Sir Philip Trousdell 2003–2005
- General Sir Redmond Watt 2005–2006
- Lieutenant General Nick Parker 2006–2007
- Major General Chris Brown 2008–2009
