= Ada Vachell =

Welsh worker for disabled people (1866–1923)

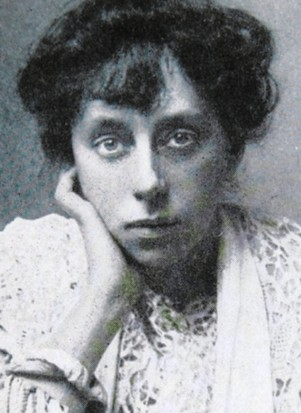
- Born: 27 December 1866; Cardiff, Wales, United Kingdom of Great Britain and Ireland
- Died: 29 December 1923 (aged 57); Clifton, Bristol, England, United Kingdom

Ada Vachell or Ada Marian Vachell or Sister Ada (27 December 1866 – 29 December 1923) was a worker for people with disabilities in Bristol.

== Life ==
Vachell was born in Cardiff in 1866. Her mother was Mary Anne or Marian (born Fedden) and William Vachell who was an iron merchant and three times Mayor of Cardiff. Scarlet fever left Ada weak and partially deaf and it killed two of her three brothers. Her father was Mayor of Cardiff for the third and last time in 1875 and in 1877 the whole family moved to Clifton in Bristol where her mother's family lived.

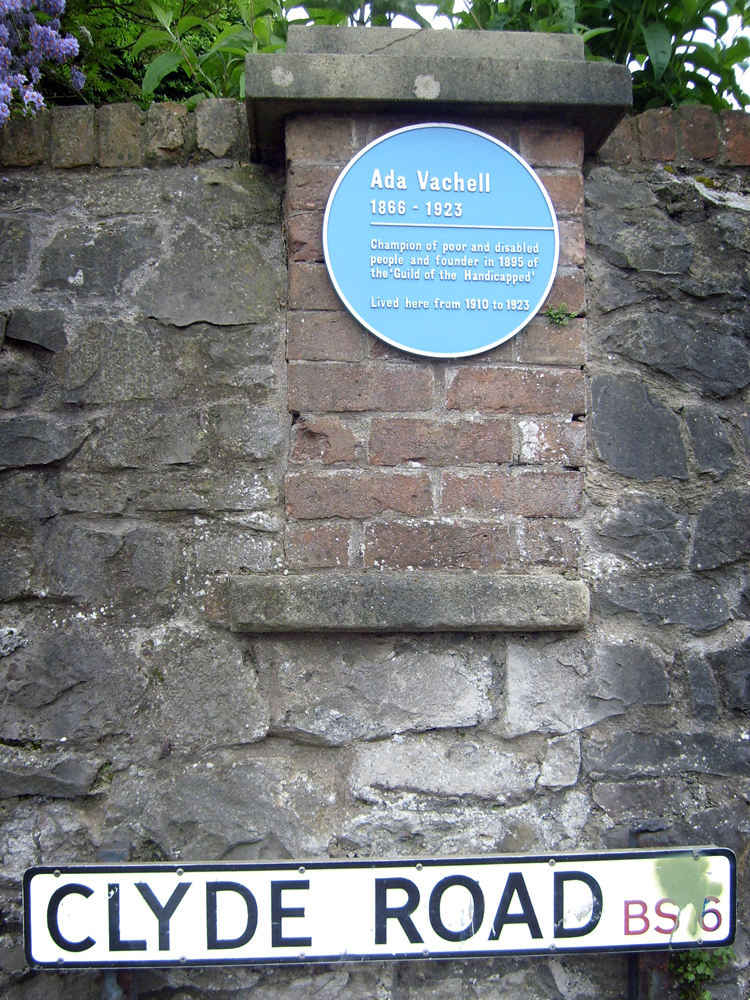
Vachell's blue plaque

Vachell appears to have had a disorderly education and she discovered her life's work when she visited Grace Kimmins who was working in East London and later in Sussex. Kimmins had taken her motto from Juliana Horatia Ewing's 1885 novel The Story of a Short Life. She started the Guild of the Poor Brave Things to help children with disabilities in London. Vachell (like Kimmins) took her motto 'Laetus sorte mea' ('Happy in my lot') from Ewing's book.

In 1913 Vachell's charity built what is now called the Guild Heritage Building in Bragg's Lane in Bristol. At the time it was called "The Guild of the Brave Poor Things". This red brick building was innovative as it featured ramps and wide doorways to ensure that it was accessible to people with disabilities.

Vachell died in Clifton on 29 December 1923. The charity that she had created continued until 1987 when it sold off its property and became a trust. The building in Bragg's Lane was used by the local council until 2010 when it was sold. Two locals bought it and it is now fittingly the local headquarters of the NSPCC.

== Legacy ==
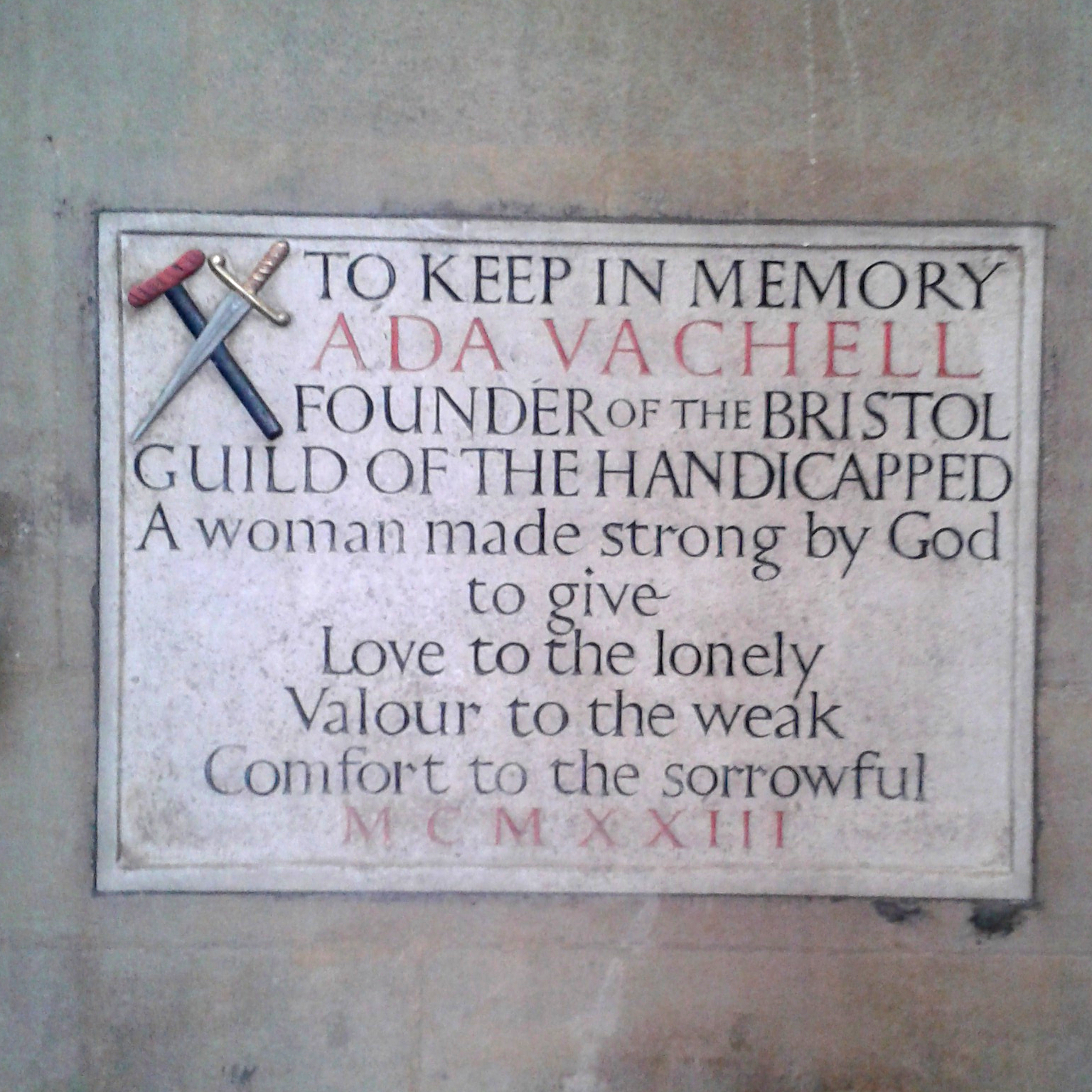

Vachell has a plaque placed in Bristol Cathedral. There is also a blue plaque recording where she used to live at Clyde Road in Bristol. Records of the Bristol Guild of Brave Poor Things (and the later Guild of the Handicapped) are held at Bristol Archives.
