= Chailey Heritage Marine Hospital =

Open Air Hospital in England

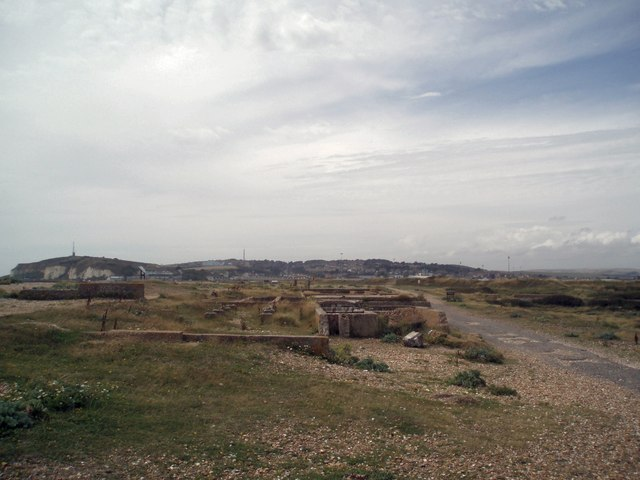
- The ruins show very weathered concrete foundations onto which were fixed what appear to be wooden buildings. Plaques on the site show beds wheeled into the fresh air - "Nature's Antibiotic". Very close to, and on the landward side of the hospital, was the Lily Warren nurses' home.

- Shown in East Sussex

Geography
- Location: Tide Mills, England, United Kingdom
- Coordinates: 50.78210°N 0.06965°E

Organisation
- Care system: Public NHS
- Type: Public

Services
- Emergency department: No Accident & Emergency

History
- Founded: 1924
- Closed: 1940

Links
- Lists: Hospitals in England

The ruins of the Chailey Heritage Marine Hospital stand to the seaward side of Tide Mills, east of Newhaven, Sussex, in England.

== History ==
The Lily Warren nurses' home was inland and the hospital built on foundations on the shingle beach itself.

The hospital, which was built to provide aftercare and recovery for disabled boys who had undergone surgery, opened in 1924. The hospital formed part of the Chailey Heritage School founded by Dame Grace Kimmins to provide education for disabled boys. Muriel Powell was matron of the hospital from its opening until her resignation in 1933.

The War Office regarded the area as a potential invasion site and considered that the buildings might provide cover for invading German forces; the hospital was therefore demolished in 1940 during the Second World War.

== See also ==
- Healthcare in Sussex
- List of hospitals in England
