= David House =

British Army general

Lieutenant-General Sir David House GCB KCVO CBE MC

Gentleman Usher of the Black Rod
- In office 10 January 1978 – 14 January 1985
- Monarch: Elizabeth II
- Preceded by: Sir Frank Twiss
- Succeeded by: Sir John Gingell

Personal details
- Born: David George House; 8 August 1922 Steyning, Sussex
- Died: 14 July 2012 (aged 89) North Yorkshire
- Awards: Knight Grand Cross of the Order of the Bath; Knight Commander of the Royal Victorian Order; Commander of the Order of the British Empire; Military Cross; Mentioned in Despatches

Military service
- Allegiance: United Kingdom
- Branch/service: British Army
- Years of service: 1941–1977
- Rank: Lieutenant-General
- Unit: King's Royal Rifle Corps; Royal Green Jackets
- Commands: Headquarters Northern Ireland; 51st Gurkha Brigade; 1st Green Jackets (43rd and 52nd)
- Battles/wars: Second World War; Indonesia–Malaysia confrontation Northern Ireland
- Service number: 203138

Lieutenant-General Sir David George House GCB KCVO CBE MC (8 August 1922 – 14 July 2012) was a British Army officer who was General Officer Commanding in Northern Ireland during the Troubles, and later held the office of Black Rod (similar to a serjeant-at-arms) at the House of Lords from 1978 to 1985.

== Early life ==
House was born on 8 August 1922 in Steyning, Sussex. He was educated at Regent's Park School in London.

== Military career ==
On leaving school, House entered the British Army. He was commissioned as a second lieutenant in the King's Royal Rifle Corps on 23 August 1941. He served in the Italian Campaign, and ended the war as a war substantive captain.

On 19 April 1947, House transferred from an emergency to a regular commission and was promoted to lieutenant. He was promoted to captain on 8 August 1949.

In 1959, he was appointed, as a major, to the staff of the first Chief of the Defence Staff, Marshal of the Royal Air Force Sir William Dickson (RAF officer).[33]

House commanded the 1st Green Jackets (43rd and 52nd) at Penang from January 1964 to December 1964, and in West Berlin to September 1965. He served in Borneo during the Indonesia–Malaysia confrontation. He was promoted to colonel on 3 November 1965, with seniority from 1 July 1964. From 1965 to 1967, he commanded 51st Gurkha Brigade in Borneo, during the Indonesia–Malaysia confrontation. He was promoted to brigadier on 31 December 1966. From 1967 to 1969, he was chief of BRIXMIS. From April 1969 to January 1971, he was Deputy Military Secretary. He was promoted to major general on 9 June 1971, with seniority from 1 November 1970. From 1971 to 1973 Deputy Chief of Staff of the British Army of the Rhine. He left the post of Chief of Staff on 13 August 1973.

He was appointed Director of Infantry on 21 September 1973, and left the post on 27 May 1975. On 1 August 1975, he succeeded Sir Frank King as GOC Northern Ireland, and was promoted to lieutenant general with seniority from 1 January 1975. His time in command was marked by the ending of a Provisional IRA ceasefire in January 1976, and a resulting upsurge of violence. He was replaced by Timothy Creasey on 1 November 1977.

House retired from active service on 30 December 1977.

== Later life ==
On 10 January 1978, he was appointed Gentleman Usher of the Black Rod, a ceremonial post in the House of Lords. He was succeeded by Air Chief Marshal Sir John Gingell on 14 January 1985.

He died on 14 July 2012.

== Personal life ==
In 1947, House married Sheila Betty Darwin. Together they had two daughters, Jennifer and Elizabeth.

== Honours and decorations ==
House was awarded the Military Cross on 8 February 1945 "in recognition of gallant and distinguished services in Italy". On 22 June 1965, he was Mentioned in Despatches "in recognition of gallant and distinguished services in the Borneo Territories".

He was appointed Officer of the Order of the British Empire in the 1964 New Year Honours. on 16 May 1967, he was promoted to Commander of the Order of the British Empire "in recognition of Distinguished Services in the Borneo Territories during the period 24 June 1966 to 11 August 1966". In the 1975 Queen's Birthday Honours, he was appointed a Knight Commander of the Order of the Bath. In celebration of Elizabeth II's Silver Jubilee and birthday on 11 June 1977, he was promoted to Knight Grand Cross of the Order of the Bath. In the 1985 New Year Honours, he was appointed a Knight Commander of the Royal Victorian Order.

He was appointed Colonel Commandant of The Light Division on 31 December 1973 in succession to General Sir Antony Read. On 1 November 1977, his tenure expired and was succeeded by Lieutenant General Sir Peter Hudson. He was appointed Colonel Commandant of the Small Arms School Corps on 1 December 1974 also in succession to General Sir Antony Read. He was succeeded on 1 September 1977 by the then Major General Timothy Creasey.

Military offices
Preceded by Sir Frank King	General Officer Commanding the British Army in Northern Ireland; 1975–1977	Succeeded by Sir Timothy Creasey
Government offices
Preceded by Sir Frank Twiss	Black Rod; 1978–1985	Succeeded by Sir John Gingell
