= Percy Nunn =

Sir Thomas Percy Nunn
- Born: 28 December 1870
- Died: 12 December 1944 (aged 73)
- Occupation: Educationist

Sir Thomas Percy Nunn (28 December 1870 – 12 December 1944) was a British educationalist, Professor of Education, 1913–36 at Institute of Education, University of London. He was knighted in 1930.

== Early life ==
Nunn was born in Bristol in 1870. His grandfather and father were schoolmasters. He was interested in making of mathematical instruments and writing plays. He got his education at Bristol University College. He received his B.A in 1895.

== Career ==
His career started as a secondary school teacher at grammar school in London in 1891. From 1891 till 1901 he developed methods of teaching which revolutionised the teaching of mathematics in the UK.

In 1903 he became a member of the staff in the London Day Training college. He worked as a part-time lecturer. In 1915 he attended the third Conference of the New Ideals in Education in Stratford where a group including Belle Rennie, William Mather and Nunn agreed that a new teacher training facility was required. This would lead to the Gipsy Hill College in South London which in time became a key part of Kingston University.

Nunn became a professor of education at the University of London. In 1922 he was appointed Principal of the university.

He was the president of the Aristotelian Society from 1923-1924.

== Selected publications ==
- The teaching of algebra (including trigonometry). 1914.
- Education: its data and first principles. 1920.
- Relativity and gravitation: an elementary treatise upon Einstein's theory. 1923.

Academic offices
Preceded by Alfred North Whitehead	President of the Mathematical Association; 1918–1919	Succeeded by Sir Edmund Taylor Whittaker
