= Guild of the Brave Poor Things =

British charity for disabled children

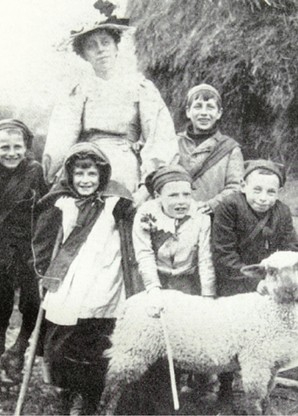
Ada Vachell with Bristol children and sheep

The Guild of the Brave Poor Things was a British charity for disabled children. It was established in 1894 by Dame Grace Kimmins (1871–1954) et al. to provide resources and education for disabled boys to enable them to make a productive place for themselves in society.

== History ==
In 1894, Kimmins organised a meeting which resulted in the foundation of the Guild of the Brave Poor Things. Juliana Horatia Ewing's 1885 novel The Story of a Short Life inspired Kimmins to start the Guild to help children with disabilities. Grace (and later Ada Vachell took their motto ‘Laetus sorte mea’ (‘Happy in my lot’) from Ewing's book.

Child Life, the journal of the Froebel Society, described the Guild as "a band of men, women, and children of any creed or none, who are disabled for the battle of life, and at the same time are determined to fight a good fight". While this may seem patronising in the 21st century it was typical of the way good quality initiatives were started by women of strong character in the 19th century. In 1895 the guild inspired Ada Vachell to create a similar facility in Bristol which continued until 1987.

The Guild of the Brave Poor Things also spawned the Chailey Heritage residential centre.

== Supporters ==
- Millicent Fawcett (1847–1929), the leader of the National Union of Women's Suffrage Societies
- Hugh Price Hughes (1847–1902), American Christian theologian, who ran the West London Mission, which provided premises for the Guild of the Brave Poor Things prior to its move first to Bermondsey University Settlement and later to the Chapter House of Southwark Cathedral
- Mary Neal (1860–1944), responsible for the direction of play sessions at Marchmont Hall
- Emmeline Pethick, better known as Emmeline Pethick-Lawrence (1867–1954) and a leader of the substantially more militant Women's Social and Political Union (WSPU) and a 'Sister of the People' at the West London Mission.
- Mrs Mary Ward (1851-1920), suffragette and novelist
- Lord Llangattock (the 1st Baron Llangattock) (1837–1912), responsible for finance for Boys and Girls Craft Schools.

== Archives ==
Local branches of the Guild hold archives in their corresponding county record office. The National Archives Discovery Catalogue lists the Hull Branch held at Hull History Centre, the Reading Branch held at Berkshire Record Office, and the Bedford Branch held at Bedfordshire Archives and Records Service. The records of the 'Bristol Guild of the Handicapped', known up until 1918 as the 'Guild of the Brave Poor Things' are held at Bristol Archives.

The History of Place project researched archival histories of the Guild which led to an exhibition at M Shed in Bristol during 2018.

== Other resources ==
Part of the Guild of the Brave Poor Things facilities via the Chailey Heritage, but at some distance from Chailey itself was the now derelict Heritage Marine Hospital at Tide Mills on the beach east of Newhaven harbour.

== See also ==
"The Guild of the Brave Poor Things", a critical essay by feminist artists Park McArthur and Constantina Zavitsanos exploring disability, care and reliance, published in Trap Door: Trans Cultural Production and the Politics of Visibility (MIT Press, 2017).
