= Waistcoat (Garthwaite/Lekeux) =

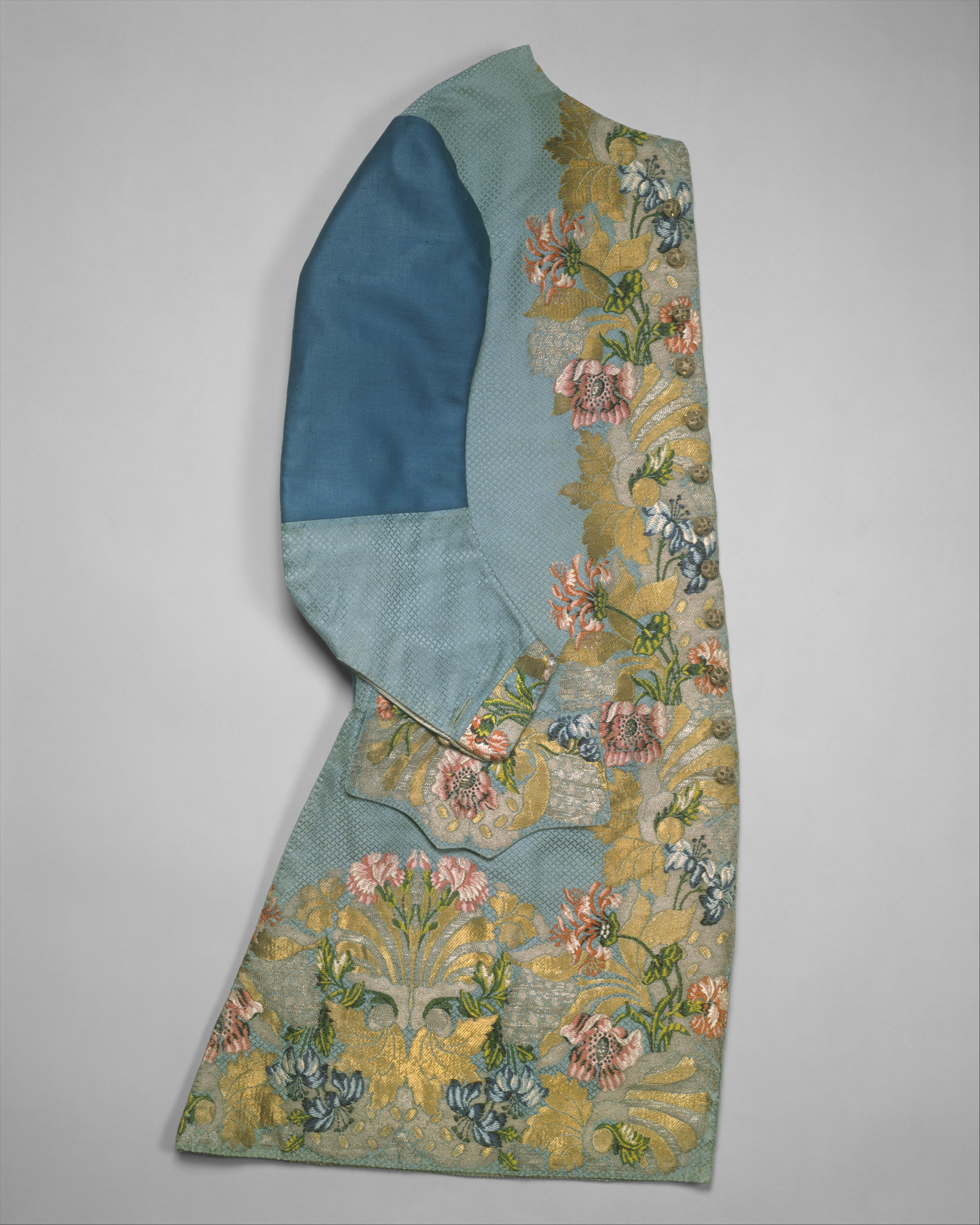
- Waistcoat, silk, wool and metallic thread, 1747, The Met, C.I.66.14.2
- Year: 1747
- Location: Metropolitan Museum of Art
- Accession: C.I.66.14.2

A man's waistcoat with sleeves of 1747 is a rare example of eighteenth century clothing for which the garment itself, the original textile design, and a dated record of both the designer and the master weaver who made the fabric have also survived. The waistcoat is part of the collection of the Costume Institute at the Metropolitan Museum of Art in New York, number C.I.66.14.2.

The waistcoat is made of "porcelain blue silk with a rich brocading of silver and silver-gilt foliate forms entwined with realistic flowers in polychrome silk on fronts, skirts, pocket flaps, and cuffs". It would have been worn under a full-skirted coat with matching breeches. The parts of the waistcoat that would show under an unbuttoned coat or at the side and back slits of the coat skirts are made of silk brocade fabric specifically woven to fit the floral designs to the shapes of the various parts of the waistcoat. Such "shap'd" silks were produced in the London silk-weaving center of Spitalfields from around 1730 to 1760. The silk was designed by Anna Maria Garthwaite and woven by master weaver Peter Lekeux. Garthwaite's annotated design for the textile, dated October 1747, is in the collection of the Victoria and Albert Museum, London, item 5985.13.

Created in 1747, the waistcoat represents the height of English silk weaving design, which "in the 1740s achieved a particularly English interpretation of Rococo, with an accurate rendering of botanical detail ... in clear, true colours."

== Silk textile ==
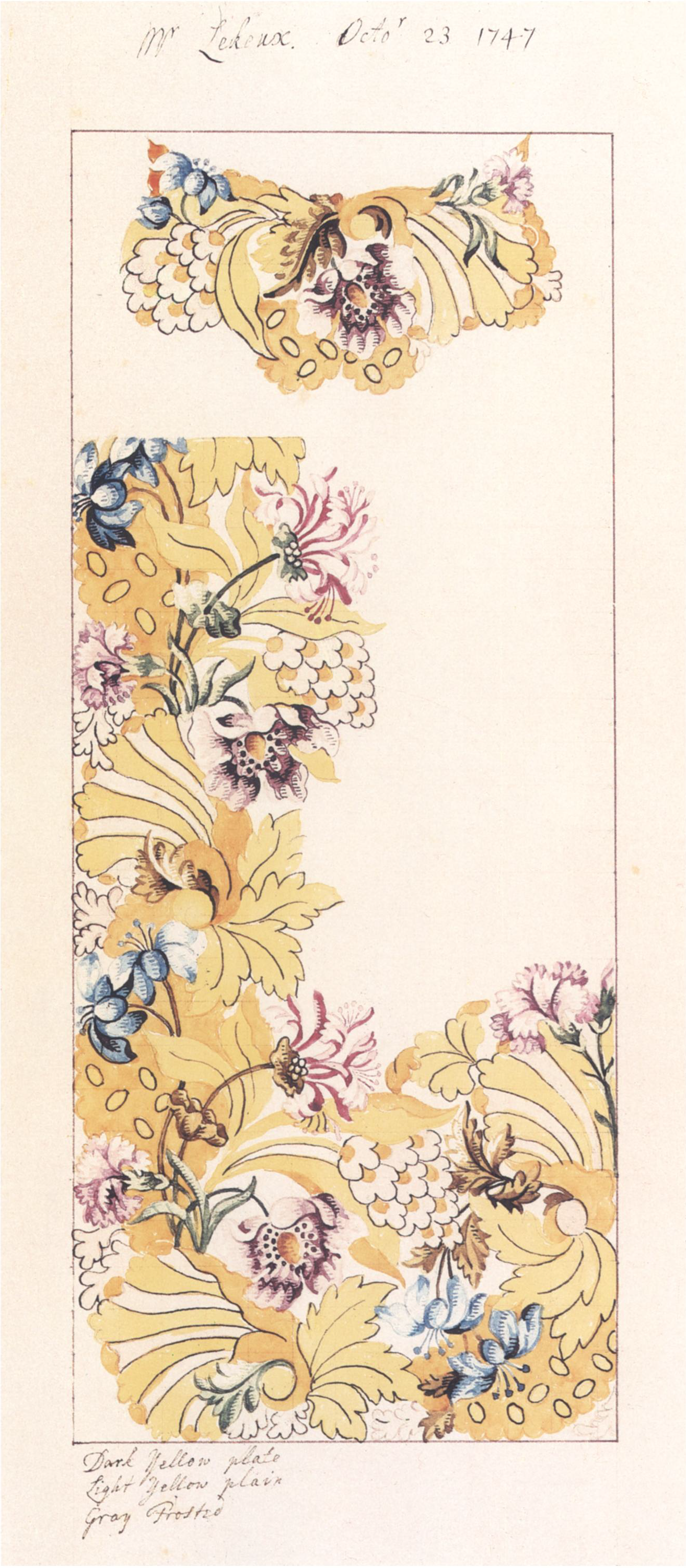
"A Silver and Silk Waiscoat". Texitle design by Anna Maria Garthwaite, 1747, Victoria and Albert Museum 5985.13

The waistcoat is made from a silk brocade woven with three types of silver gilt thread and mutilcoloured silks. The floral design was the work of Anna Maria Garthwaite, who was acknowledged as one of the premiere English silk designers of her day. Many of her original designs in watercolours have survived, and silks based on these designs have been identified in portraiture and in costume collections in England and abroad. Garthwaite was born in Leicestershire in 1688. She began her freelance textile design career in York, sending the finished designs up to London. She moved to the London silkweaving center of Spitalfields with her widowed sister around 1730, and there she created designs for woven silks over the next three decades. Portfolios of her original designs in watercolors from the 1720s through 1756 have survived and are now in the collection of the Victoria and Albert Museum. Many of these designs are dated and annotated with weaving instructions and the names of the weavers to whom they were sold.

Garthwaite's design for the silk used for the Met's waistcoat, worked up in pencil, ink, and watercolor, is part of this collection. A note at the top indicates that this design was made for "Mr Lekeux Oct^{r} 23 1747". Peter Lekeux (1716–1768) was a third-generation London silk weaver of Huguenot origin. In 1730 he was apprenticed to his father, also named Peter, known in the records as Captain Lekeux from his rank in the Trained Band. After his father's death, the younger Peter became a master in the Flowered Silks branch of the Worshipful Company of Weavers and rose to the company's highest office, upper bailiff, in July 1764.

Fashionable silk designs changed with the seasons, but general trends can be seen over longer periods. Sprays of botanically accurate flowers appear in Garthwaite's work from 1743; these were brocaded in silk against a figured ground, using an adaptation of the tapestry weaver's points rentrés technique to produce near-three-dimensional floral patterns through careful shading. Many of the designs Garthwaite sold to Lekeux featured silver patterns combined with naturalistic florals. A note at the bottom of Garthwaite's design for the silk waistcoat indicates the three types of metal thread to be used in executing the design. In the drawing, dark yellow represents "plate" (lamé), a flat metal strip; light yellow represents "plain" (filé), metal strip wound around a silk or linen core; and gray represents "frosted" (frisé), a thread with an overtwisted silk core to produce a sparkling effect.

== Provenance ==
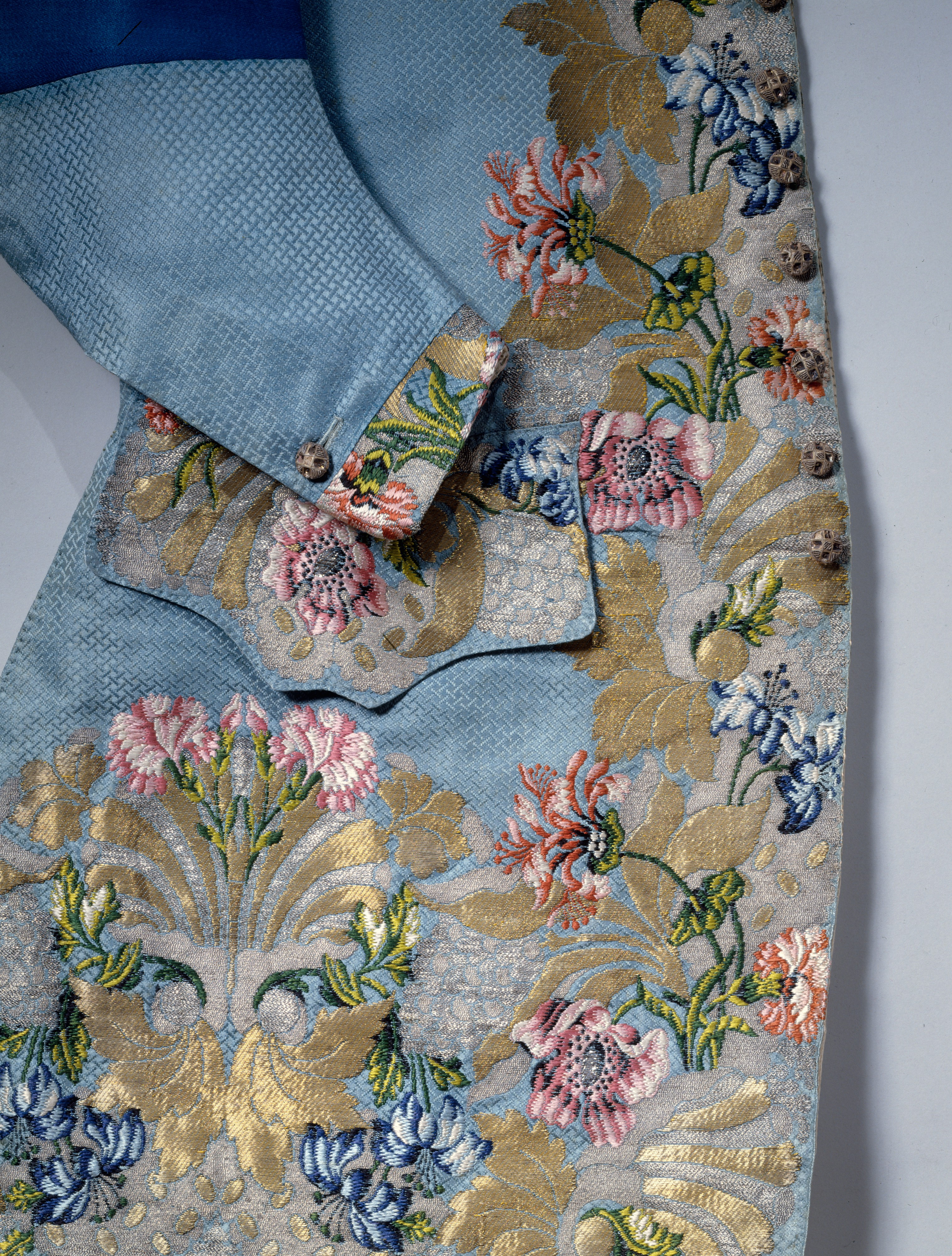
Detail of the woven silk on the waistcoat front, cuff, and pocket flap.

The waistcoat was acquired by the Met in 1966 with funds from the Irene Lewisohn Bequest. The seller was Cora Ginsburg, of Ginsburg and Levy, who had acquired the piece at auction in London.
