= Harry Tuzo =

British Army general (1917–1998)

General Sir Harry Tuzo GCB OBE MC DL
- Born: 26 August 1917; Bangalore, British India
- Died: 7 August 1998 (aged 80); Norwich, Norfolk, England
- Military career
- Allegiance: United Kingdom
- Branch: British Army
- Service years: 1939–1978
- Rank: General
- Service number: 94690
- Unit: Royal Artillery
- Commands: Deputy Supreme Allied Commander Europe (1976–78); Northern Army Group (1973–1976); Northern Ireland (1971–1973); Royal Artillery (1969–1971); 51 Gurkha Infantry Brigade (1963–1965); 3rd Regiment Royal Horse Artillery (1960–1962)
- Conflicts: Second World War; Indonesia–Malaysia confrontation Northern Ireland
- Awards: Knight Grand Cross of the Order of the Bath; Officer of the Order of the British Empire; Military Cross; Mentioned in Despatches (2)
- Other work: Chairman, Marconi Space and Defence Systems (1979–1983); Chairman, Royal United Services Institute (1980–1983)

General Sir Henry Crauford Tuzo (26 August 1917 – 7 August 1998) was a British Army officer who was General Officer Commanding in Northern Ireland during the early period of the Troubles and later Deputy Supreme Allied Commander Europe.

== Early life ==
Henry Tuzo was born in Bangalore, India, on 26 August 1917, the son of John Atkinson Tuzo, a British Army officer and civil engineer, and his wife Annie Catherine (née Craufurd). Tuzo was educated at Wellington College, Berkshire (where he was a member of the Officer Training Corps), and Oriel College, Oxford, where he read jurisprudence.

== Second World War ==
Tuzo first entered the British Army on 15 July 1939 as a second lieutenant in the Royal Artillery, Supplementary Reserve of Officers, just prior to the outbreak of the Second World War in September. After a fortnight's training he crossed to France with the 21st Anti-Tank Regiment, Royal Artillery, which was part of the 3rd Infantry Division under Major General Bernard Montgomery. The division was part of the British Expeditionary Force (BEF). Remaining there and seeing no action until the German Army invaded France in May 1940, he was amongst the last of those evacuated from Dunkirk, travelling in a paddle cruiser to Harwich.

He stayed with his regiment, which in 1942 transferred to the Guards Armoured Division, engaged in coastal defence until June 1944 when they returned to France in the invasion of Normandy. His regiment was in support of the division in Normandy where he won the Military Cross (MC) for his actions up to Operation Goodwood (the breakout from Caen). He was then a war substantive captain and temporary major commanding Y Battery of the regiment consisting of self-propelled anti-tank guns, the original recommendation for his MC mentions his actions at the Albert Canal bridgehead, the attacks on Hechtel, Elst, Sittard and particularly in support of the Coldstream Guards at Wesel; he was slightly wounded three times during this period. Later in Germany he had the rare distinction as a battery commander of accepting the surrender of a German admiral who was Flag Officer U-boats. As the end of the war approached, he was granted a Regular Army commission, with the substantive rank of lieutenant (with seniority from 24 February 1941), on 17 January 1945. He was Mentioned in Despatches on 9 August 1945, and his MC was gazetted on 22 January 1946. He received substantive promotion to captain on 1 July 1946. He had married Monica Patience Salter on 5 October 1943.

== Borneo ==
From 1963 to 1965 he commanded the 51st Gurkha Brigade in Borneo, which included Brunei in its area of operations. His Gurkha battalions worked to win the "hearts and minds" of the locals, but also participated with the SAS in Operation Claret, which interdicted Indonesian troops as they attempted to cross the border. The Sultan of Brunei honoured Tuzo with the title Dato Setia Nagara in 1965. His work also earned him a Mention in Despatches.

== Northern Ireland ==
Tuzo was appointed as General Officer Commanding and Director of Operations, Northern Ireland, on 2 March 1971 together with promotion to lieutenant general. His appointment was made after the previous incumbent, Lieutenant General Vernon Erskine-Crum, suffered a heart attack. Tuzo was appointed Knight Commander of the Order of the Bath (KCB) on 4 June 1971, in the Queen's Birthday Honours. In 1972, after consultation with Whitehall, Tuzo ordered Operation Motorman, which sent 30,000 troops into Republican-dominated 'no-go' areas of West Belfast and Derry to take back control. He relinquished his position in Northern Ireland on 1 February 1973 and was replaced by Lieutenant General Sir Frank King. Tuzo was promoted to Knight Grand Cross of the Order of the Bath (GCB) on 2 June 1973.

After his service in Northern Ireland ended Tuzo was appointed Commander-in-Chief British Army of the Rhine until 1976, when he was made Deputy Supreme Allied Commander Europe. He was placed on the retired list on 5 February 1979. After his service in the army he accepted a position in 1979 as chairman of Marconi Space and Defence Systems which he held until 1983.

== Norfolk ==
Tuzo was appointed a Deputy Lieutenant of Norfolk on 12 September 1983. He was chairman of Pensthorpe Nature Reserve. Tuzo's granddaughter is the journalist Rosie Garthwaite.

Military offices
Preceded by Vernon Erskine-Crum	GOC British Army in Northern Ireland; 1971–1973	Succeeded by Sir Frank King
Preceded by Sir Peter Hunt	C-in-C British Army of the Rhine; 1973–1976	Succeeded by Sir Frank King
Preceded by Sir John Mogg	Deputy Supreme Allied Commander Europe; 1976–1978	Succeeded by Sir Jack Harman
Honorary titles
Preceded by Sir Geoffrey Baker	Master Gunner, St James's Park; 1977–1983	Succeeded by Sir Thomas Morony
