= Chris Brown (British Army officer) =

British Army officer (21st century)

Lieutenant General Chris Brown CBE
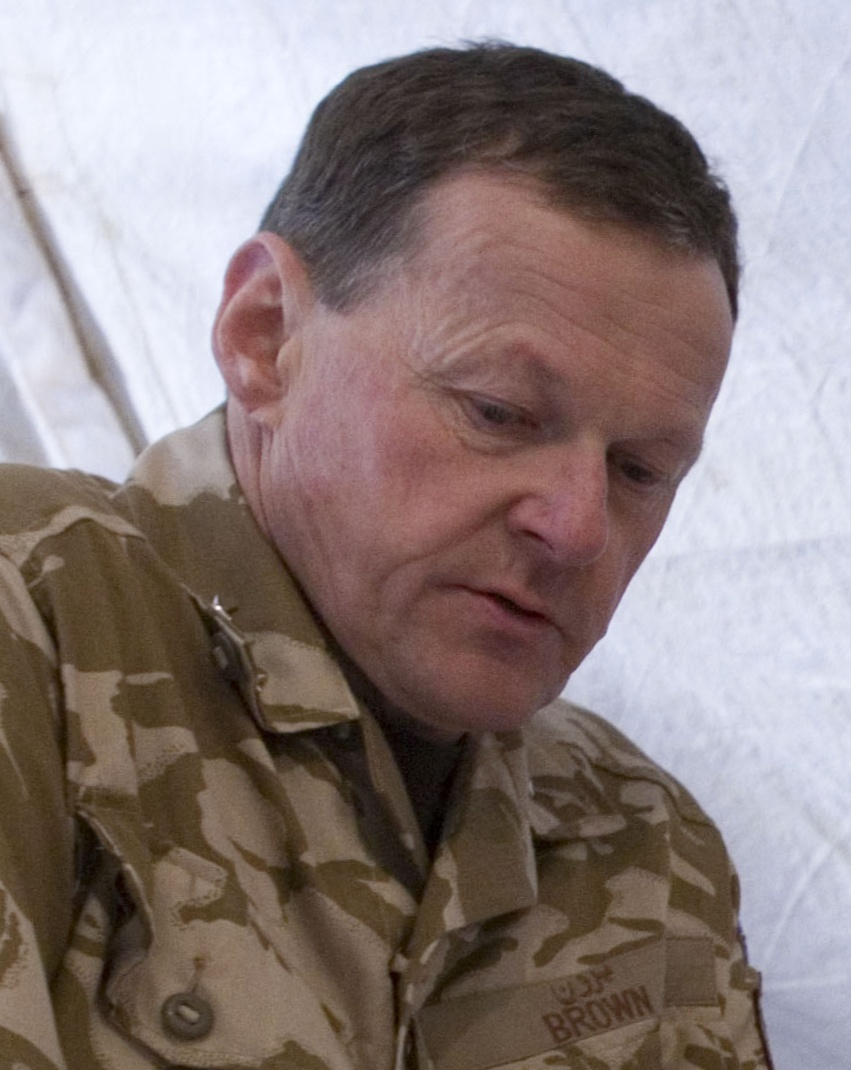
- Brown in 2009
- Military career
- Allegiance: United Kingdom
- Branch: British Army
- Service years: 1974–2010
- Rank: Lieutenant General
- Commands: 7th Parachute Regiment Royal Horse Artillery; Northern Ireland
- Conflicts: Bosnian War; Iraq War
- Awards: Commander of the Order of the British Empire

Lieutenant General Christopher Charles Brown CBE is a retired British Army officer who was the last general officer commanding Northern Ireland.

== Military career ==
Educated at Brentwood School and University College, Cardiff, Brown was commissioned into the Royal Artillery in 1974.

In 1994 he was appointed commanding officer of 7th Parachute Regiment Royal Horse Artillery. He then went to Sarajevo as assistant chief of staff for the Allied Rapid Reaction Corps during the Bosnian War. In 1999 he was appointed Commander Royal Artillery for 1st Armoured Division and in 2002 he became director, Royal Artillery. In 2004 he returned to Allied Rapid Reaction Corps as chief of staff. He became the last general officer commanding Northern Ireland in 2008: The post was downgraded to that of a brigadier when Brown left in 2009. In March 2009 he was deployed as Senior British Military Representative and Deputy Commanding General, Multinational Force, Iraq and in 2010 he became the Iraq Compendium Study Team leader. He retired from the Army in 2010.

== Later life ==
After retiring from military service, Brown worked as an advisor to the African Union on security for the 2011 South Sudanese independence referendum. He now works for the Brenthurst Foundation, an NGO, and lectures on diplomacy at the University of London.

Military offices
Preceded by Sir Nick Parker	General Officer Commanding the British Army in Northern Ireland; 2008–2009	Succeeded by Command disbanded
Preceded by John Cooper	Senior British Military Representative and Deputy Commanding General, Multinational Force, Iraq; March 2009 – July 2009	Succeeded by Force disbanded
