= Belle Rennie =

British educationist

- Born: Isabella Southern Moorhouse; 17 February 1875; Westoe, England
- Died: 11 April 1966 (aged 91); Royal Tunbridge Wells, England
- Occupation: educationalist
- Known for: introducing Montessori education and the Dalton Plan
- Children: one

Belle Rennie born Isabella Southern "Belle" Moorhouse (17 February 1875 – 11 April 1966) was a British educationist. Her Conference of the New Ideals in Education led to the creation of Gipsy Hill College in South London, a key part of Kingston University, that spread the ideas of Montessori education and the Dalton Plan.

== Life ==
Rennie was born 1875 in Westoe. Her parents were Isabella (born Southern) and Thomas Firth Moorhouse. Her father was a manager and an analytical chemist who killed himself while doing an experiment. Her mother took the family back to her hometown of Gateshead. In about 1887 the family moved again to Harrogate where her mother married Dr Rennie. The whole family took the new surname, while their stepfather became rich looking after his patients. Her father however suffered from the workload, so they moved to Torquay where he effectively retired.

On 28 December 1908 the Messina earthquake struck and Rennie decided that she could adopt an orphan baby. She had been told that her dislocated hip meant that she would never have her own child. She went to Messina accompanied by a former governess and by persistence moved away any problems there might have been. She returned to England with a seven-month-old baby she had found in a convent in Naples. By this time her family were living in the New Forest and her parents agreed to adopt the child to ensure that no one thought she was Belle's natural daughter. Rennie took an interest not only in this child's development, but in development in general. She visited the Montessori Institute in Italy, and she decided to organise the first Conference of the New Ideals in Education to discuss these ideas in 1912.

In 1914 she was at Runton for another Conference of the New Ideals in Education where she heard Lillian Daphne de Lissa who was a keynote speaker who had created the Kindergarten Union of Western Australia.

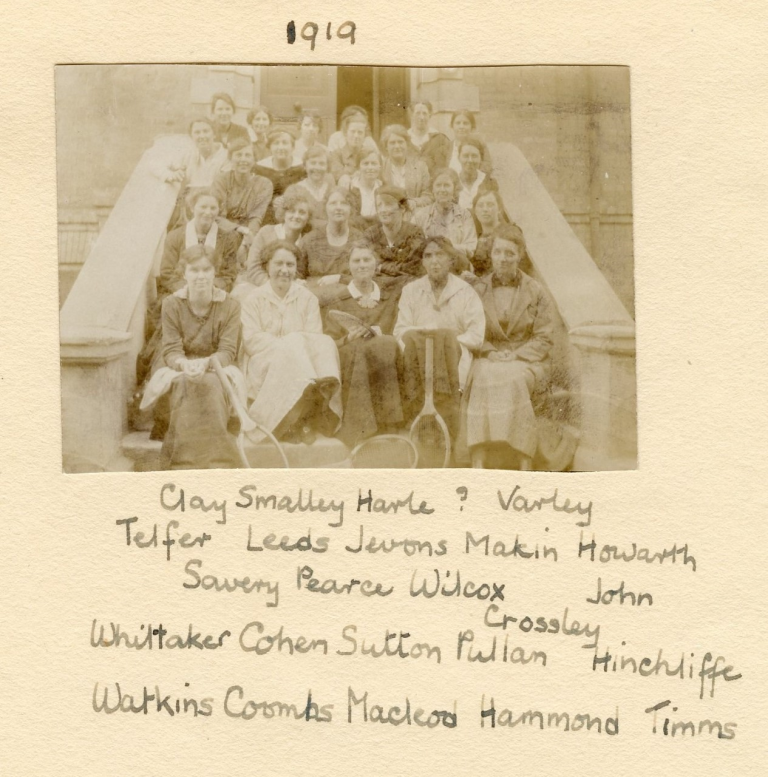
Steps of the original Gipsy Hill College building with students in 1919

In 1915 Rennie attended the third Conference of the New Ideals in Education in Stratford where a group including Rennie, Percy Nunn and William Mather agreed that a new teacher training facility was required. Rennie took the lead on the idea, and she persuaded the Board of Education to give accreditation to her new Gipsy Hill College. The Education Act 1918 was to extend the government's commitment to supplying nursery education. Rennie needed a new principal for the college. and she approached de Lissa who had been a keynote speaker at her Runton conference. This would lead to the Gipsy Hill College in South London, which gathered 14 well educated and mature students to pay £54 a year to be the first trained in October 1917. The college, in time, became a key part of Kingston University. Rennie would lead Gipsy Hill College as chair of governors until 1945.

In 1920 she went to America where she met Helen Parkhurst who was the lead for Montessori's ideas in the USA. This meeting discussed the Dalton Plan, which was named for a school in Dalton, Massachusetts. The Dalton Plan was intended to give a structure to the used of the Montessori methods for older children. The basic idea was that there should be a series of structured tasks for the child that in total contributed to a broad curriculum. Rennie became an evangelist for the approach, and she created the Dalton Association in Britain. In 1932 she published The Triumph of the Dalton Plan with the educational psychologist Charles William Kimmins.

Rennie died in Royal Tunbridge Wells in 1966.
