= Michael Forrester (British Army officer) =

British Army general

Major-General Michael Forrester CB CBE DSO* MC*
- Born: 31 August 1917; Portsmouth, Hampshire, England
- Died: 15 October 2006 (aged 89); Alton, Hampshire, England
- Military career
- Allegiance: United Kingdom
- Branch: British Army
- Service years: 1938−1970
- Rank: Major-General
- Service number: 69349
- Units: Queen's Royal Regiment (West Surrey); Parachute Regiment
- Commands: 4th Division; 16th Parachute Brigade Group; 3rd Battalion, Parachute Regiment; 2nd Battalion, Parachute Regiment; 1/6th Battalion, Queen's Royal Regiment (West Surrey)
- Conflicts: Arab revolt in Palestine; Second World War; Mau Mau Uprising
- Awards: Companion of the Order of the Bath; Commander of the Order of the British Empire; Distinguished Service Order & Bar; Military Cross & Bar; Mentioned in Despatches

Major-General Michael Forrester, CB, CBE, DSO & Bar, MC & Bar (31 August 1917 – 15 October 2006) was a British Army officer who served with distinction in the Second World War and later commanded the 4th Division.

== Early life and military career ==
Educated at Haileybury, Forrester was commissioned into the Queen's Royal Regiment (West Surrey) in 1938 and, serving with the 2nd Battalion of his regiment, then commanded by Lieutenant Colonel Robert Ross, took part in the response to the Arab revolt in Palestine in 1939.

== Second World War ==
Forrester served in the Second World War in Greece and in the Western Desert before becoming commanding officer of the 1/6th Battalion, Queen's Royal Regiment in 1943; in that role he secured the key bridge at Scafati in Italy and then took part in the Normandy landings before being wounded there in October 1944.

== Postwar ==
Forrester was appointed commanding officer of the 2nd Battalion, Parachute Regiment and served in Cyprus and Egypt during 1951 and 1952. He was made Director of Staff at the Staff College, Camberley in 1953, a General Staff Officer at General Headquarters East Africa in 1955 during the Mau Mau Uprising and commanding officer of 3rd Battalion, Parachute Regiment in 1957. He went on to be Colonel, Military Operations at the War Office in 1960, commander of the 16th Parachute Brigade Group in 1961 and General Officer Commanding 4th Division in Germany in 1965. His last appointment was as Director of Infantry at the Ministry of Defence in 1968 before he retired in 1970.

== Family ==
In 1947 Forrester married Pauline Fisher (the marriage was dissolved in 1960); they had two sons.

Military offices
Preceded by Basil Eugster	GOC 4th Division; 1965−1967	Succeeded by Vernon Erskine-Crum
