= Anna Maria Garthwaite =

British artist

- Born: probably 14 March 1688; Harston, Leicestershire, England
- Died: October 1763 (aged 75)
- Known for: Textile design

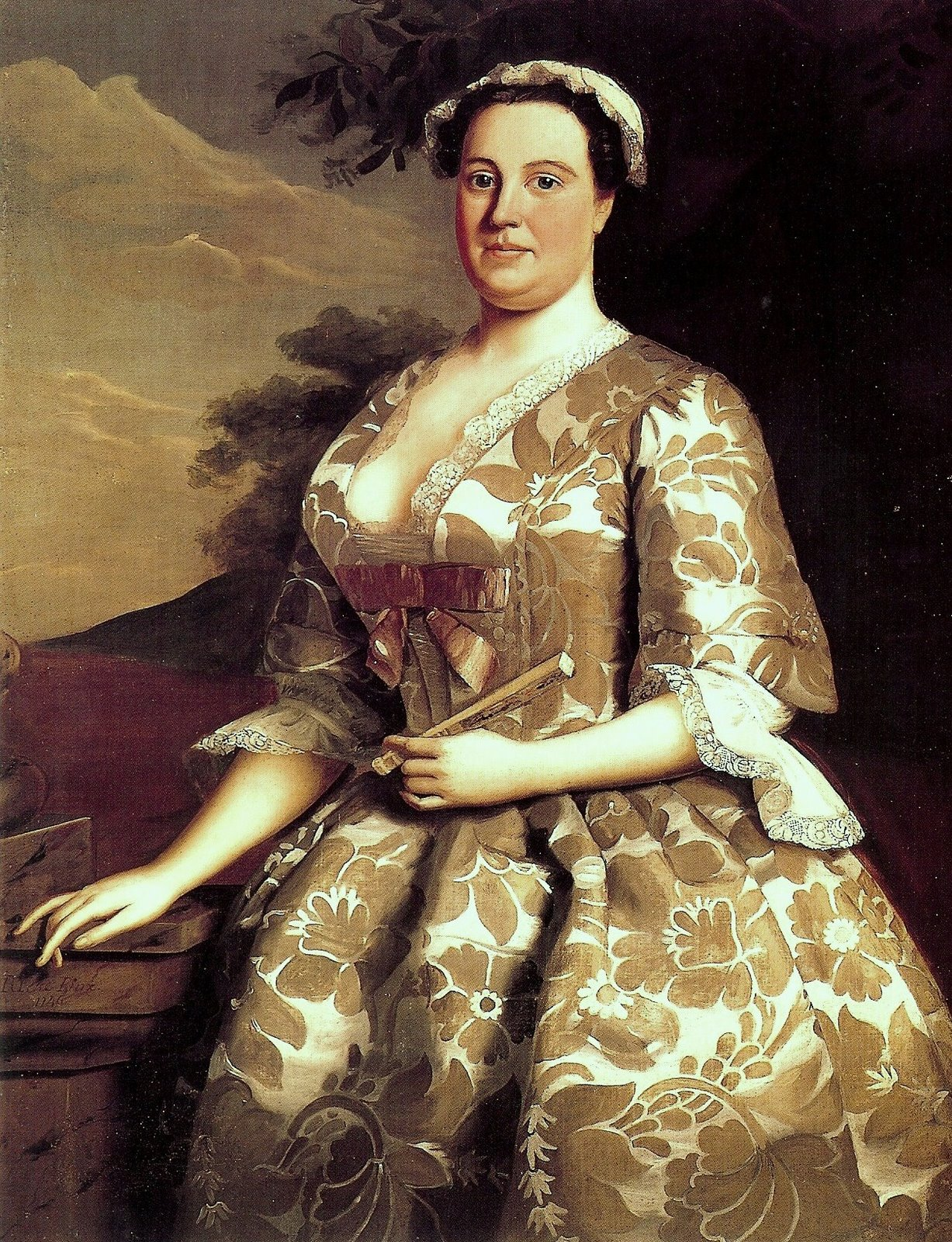
Mrs. Charles Willing of Philadelphia was painted by Robert Feke in 1746 wearing a gown of English silk damask woven to a surviving 1743 design by Anna Maria Garthwaite.

Anna Maria Garthwaite (b. Harston, Leicestershire, c. 14 March 1688 – October 1763) was an English textile designer known for creating vivid floral designs for silk fabrics hand-woven in Spitalfields, London, in the mid-18th century. Garthwaite was acknowledged as one of the premiere English designers of her day. Many of her original designs in watercolours have survived, and silks based on these designs have been identified in portraiture and in costume collections in England and abroad.

== Life and work ==
Anna Maria Garthwaite was the daughter of the Reverend Ephraim Garthwaite (1647–1719) of Grantham, Lincolnshire, who was rector of nearby Harston, Leicestershire, at the time of her birth, and his wife Rejoyce Hausted. Anna Maria left Grantham to live in York with her twice-widowed sister Mary from 1726 to 1728. They relocated to a house in Princes Street (now Princelet Street) in the silk-weaving district of Spitalfields east of the City of London in 1728, and Anna Maria created over 1000 designs for woven silks there over the next three decades. Some 874 of her original designs in watercolour from the 1720s through 1756 have survived and are now in the collection of the Victoria and Albert Museum. Many of these designs are dated and annotated with weaving instructions and the names of the weavers to whom they were sold. A waistcoat woven to one of Garthwaite's designs in the collection of the Costume Institute of the Metropolitan Museum of Art.

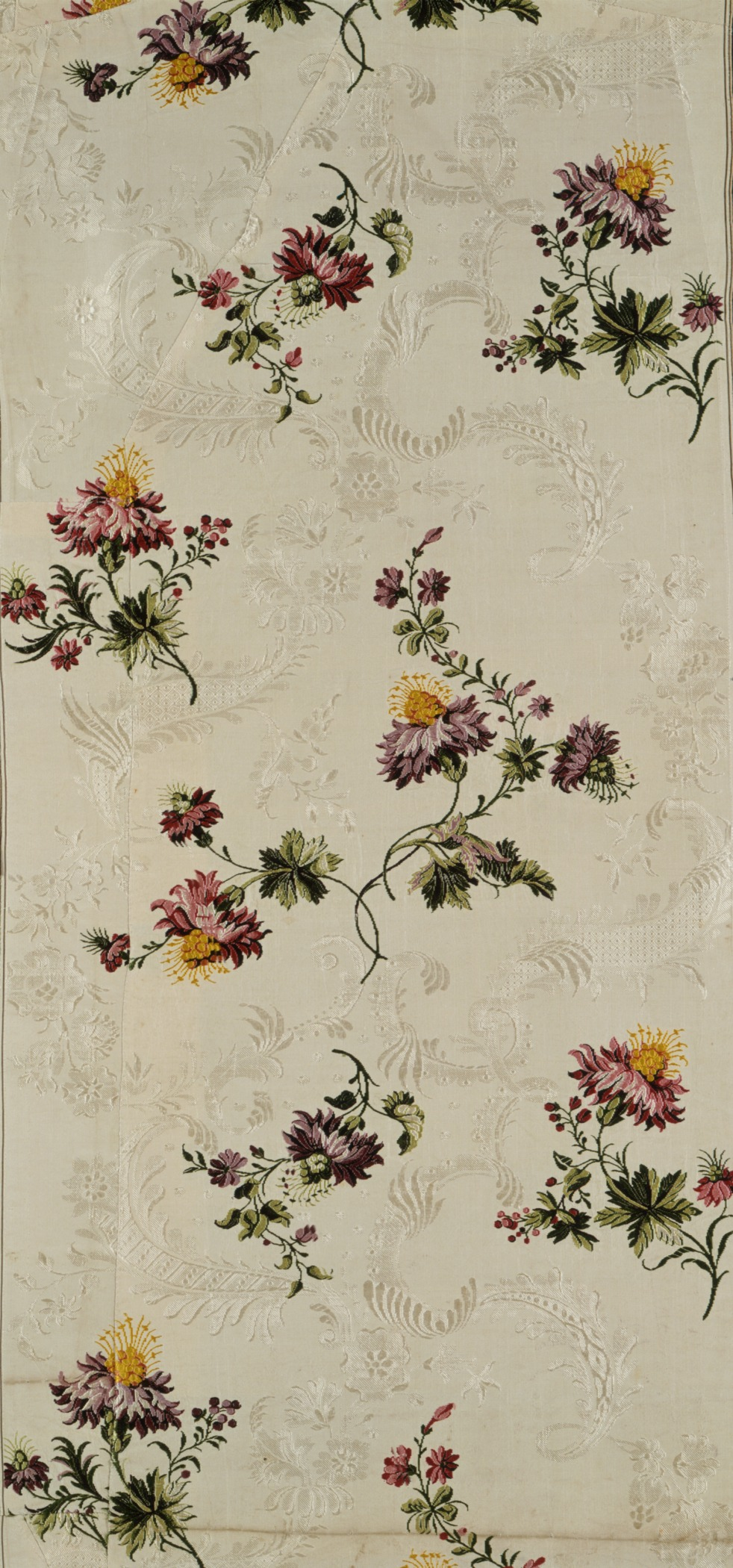
Meandering floral vines design attributed to Garthwaite, ca 1740.

Garthwaite's work is closely associated with the mid-18th century fashion for flowered woven silks in the Roccoco style, with its new emphasis on asymmetrical structures and sinuous C- and S-curves. She adapted the points rentrés technique developed by the French silk designer Jean Revel in the 1730s for representing near-three-dimensional floral patterns through careful shading, and her designs included large-scale damasks as well as floral brocades. From 1742–43, Garthwaite's work—and English silk design in general—diverged from French styles, favouring clusters of smaller naturalistic flowers in bright colours scattered across a (usually) pale ground. The taste for vividly realistic florals reflects the advances in botanical illustration in Britain at this time, and can be contrasted with French silks of the period which show stylised flowers and more harmonious, if unrealistic, colourations.

Spitalfields silks were widely exported to Northern Europe and especially to Colonial America, which was prohibited from trading directly with France by Britain's Navigation Acts. The connections established in Colonial America allowed Garthwaite's silk to be spread and recognized around the globe. Surviving silk skirt panels said to have been owned by Martha Dandridge prior to her marriage to George Washington have been attributed to Garthwaite, because the panels, which are housed in the Colonial Williamsburg collection, match one of her extant watercolor designs. A gown currently preserved at Colonial Williamsburg was made sometime between 1775 and 1785 with the silk lampas that Garthwaite designed in 1726-28, which was passed down in an American family for around fifty years and reused for three generations before being assembled into the wedding dress that is now in their collection.

Her will dated 1758 was read 24 October 1763, at Princes Street in the parish of Christ Church. She was buried at Christ Church three days later on 27 October 1763 as Anna-Maria Garthwaite aged 75 of Princes Street.

== Assessment and legacy ==
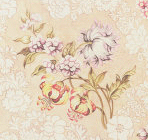
Detail of a brocaded design of peonies, lilies, and roses, 1744.

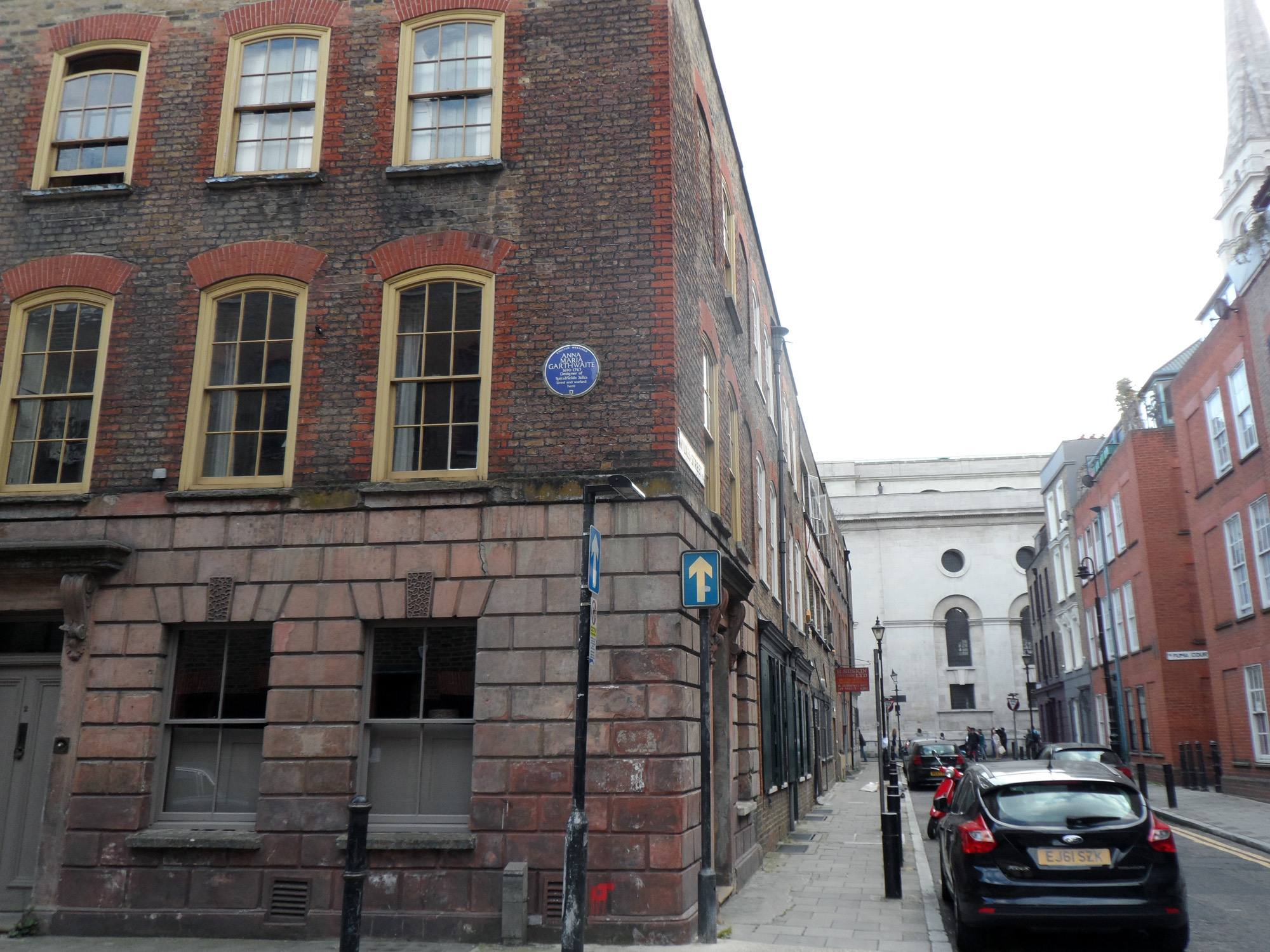
2 Princelet Street Spitalfields London E1, with plaque

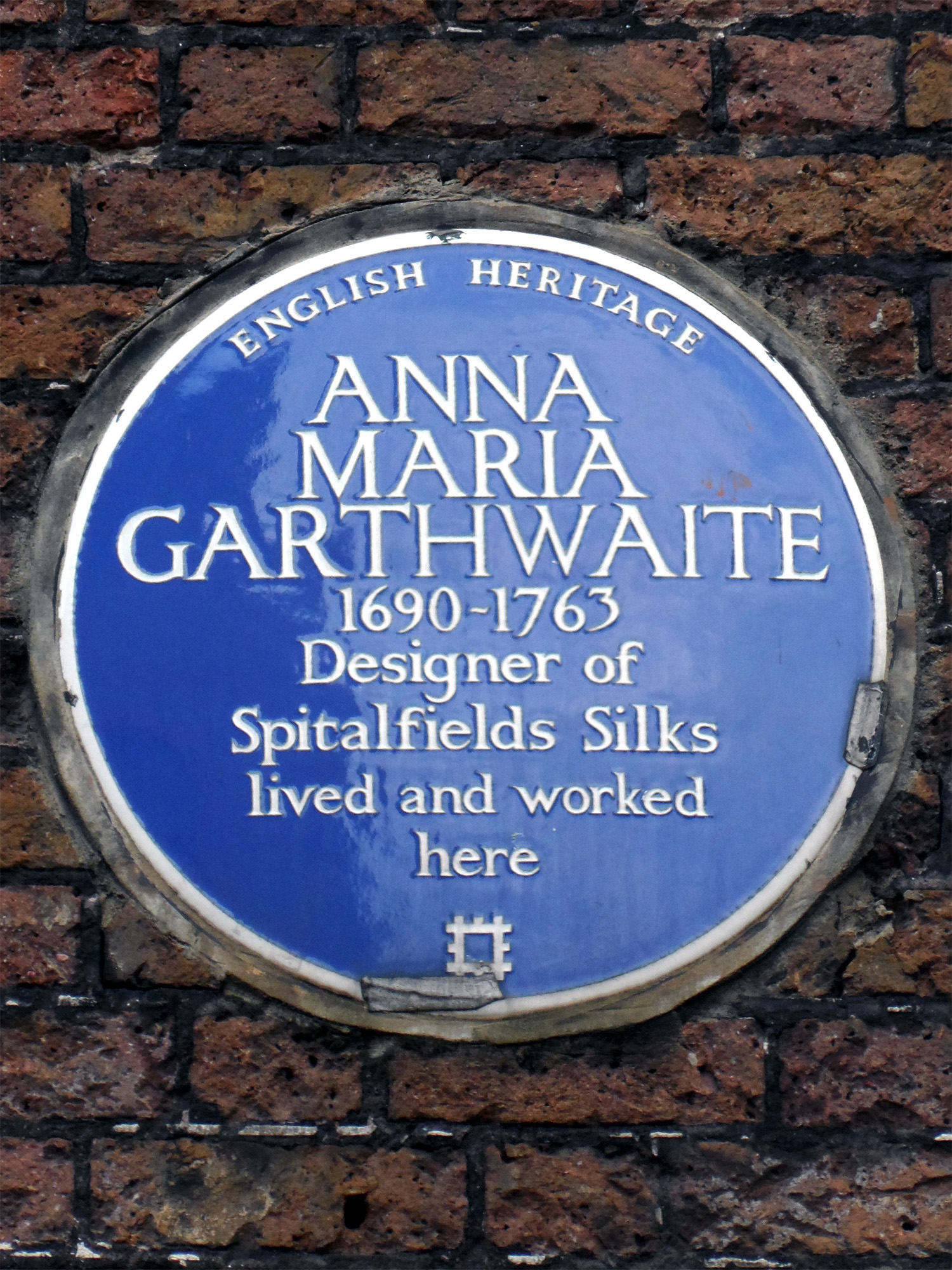

Garthwaite has been called the "pre-eminent silk designer of her period". Malachy Postlethwayt (c. 1707–1767) in The Universal Dictionary of Trade and Commerce of 1751 listed Garthwaite as one of three designers who had "introduced the Principles of Painting into the loom."

A Blue Plaque granted by English Heritage in 1998 marks the house at 2 Princelet Street, Spitalfields, E1, where Garthwaite lived and worked.

== See also ==
- History of silk
