= Garthwaite baronets =

Baronetcy in the Baronetage of the United Kingdom

The Garthwaite Baronetcy, of Durham, is a title in the Baronetage of the United Kingdom. It was created on 19 May 1919 for William Garthwaite. He was a shipowner and sugar planter and provided valuable service to the Admiralty during the First World War. As of 2024 the title is held by his great-grandson, the fourth Baronet, who succeeded his father in that year. His sister is the journalist Rosie Garthwaite.

== Garthwaite baronets, of Durham (1919) ==
- Sir William Garthwaite, 1st Baronet (1874–1956)
- Sir William Garthwaite, 2nd Baronet (1906–1993)
- Sir (William) Mark Charles Garthwaite, 3rd Baronet (1946–2024)
- Sir William Tuzo Garthwaite, 4th Baronet (born 1982).
