= Charles William Kimmins =

English educational psychologist (1856–1948)

Charles William "C. W." Kimmins (3 August 1856 – 12 January 1948) was an educational psychologist and was appointed chief inspector of the education department of the now defunct London County Council in 1904. He was appointed chief inspector at the education department of the LCC in 1904.

He was educated at Owens College, Manchester, University College, Bristol, and Downing College, Cambridge.

In 1932 he published The Triumph of the Dalton Plan with the educationalist Belle Rennie.

His wife was Grace Kimmins (Chailey Heritage, the Guild of the Poor Brave Things).

== Family ==
- Grace Kimmins, wife
- Sir Brian Charles Hannan Kimmins (1899–1979), British Army general, elder son
- Anthony Martin Kimmins (1901–1964), actor, director and producer, younger son
