= Basil Eugster =

British military general

General Sir Basil Eugster KCB KCVO CBE DSO MC*
- Born: 15 August 1914
- Died: 5 April 1984 (aged 69)
- Military career
- Allegiance: United Kingdom
- Branch: British Army
- Service years: 1935–1974
- Rank: General
- Service number: 65413
- Unit: Irish Guards
- Commands: UK Land Forces; Southern Command; British Forces in Hong Kong; London District; 4th Division; 3rd Infantry Brigade; 1st Battalion Irish Guards; 3rd Battalion Irish Guards
- Conflicts: Arab revolt in Palestine; Second World War
- Awards: Knight Commander of the Order of the Bath; Knight Commander of the Royal Victorian Order; Commander of the Order of the British Empire; Companion of the Distinguished Service Order; Military Cross & Bar; Grand Decoration of Honour in Gold with Star (Austria)

General Sir Basil Oscar Paul Eugster, KCB, KCVO, CBE, DSO, MC & Bar (15 August 1914 – 5 April 1984) was a senior British Army officer who served as Commander in Chief, UK Land Forces from 1972 to 1974.

== Army career ==
A British soldier of Swiss descent, Basil Oscar Paul Eugster attended Beaumont College. In 1935 he joined the Irish Guards. He served with his regiment through the Second World War and fought in the Narvik Campaign in Norway in 1940. He was commanding officer of the 3rd Battalion Irish Guards in 1945, and again in 1947, and of the 1st Battalion Irish Guards from 1951 to 1954.

Eugster served as commander of the 3rd Infantry Brigade in Cyprus from 1959 to 1962 and was then General Officer Commanding 4th Division in Germany from 1963 to 1965. He went on to become Major-General commanding the Household Brigade and General Officer Commanding London District from 1965 to 1968 and Commander of British Forces in Hong Kong from 1968 to 1970. In 1966, Eugster was awarded the Austrian Grand Decoration of Honour in Gold with Star. He was then General Officer Commanding Southern Command from 1971 to 1972. He served as the Commander in Chief, UK Land Forces from 1972 to 1974 when he retired.

== Later career ==
Eugster was Colonel of the Regiment of the Irish Guards until his death in 1984, aged 69.

Military offices
Preceded by Jean Allard	General Officer Commanding the 4th Division; 1963–1965	Succeeded by Michael Forrester
Preceded by Sir John Nelson	GOC London District; 1965–1968	Succeeded by Michael Fitzalan-Howard
Preceded by Sir John Worsley	Commander of British Forces in Hong Kong; 1968–1970	Succeeded by Sir Richard Ward
Preceded by Sir Michael Carver	GOC-in-C Southern Command; 1971–1972	Command disbanded
New title	Commander in Chief, UK Land Forces; 1972–1974	Succeeded by Sir Roland Gibbs
