= Rosie Garthwaite =

English journalist

- Born: 1980 (age 45–46); London, England, United Kingdom
- Education: University of Oxford (MA)
- Military career
- Allegiance: United Kingdom

Rosie Francesca Garthwaite (born 1980) is an English journalist and former military officer.

== Early life ==
Garthwaite was born and raised in Hammersmith, London in 1980, the eldest of three children of Sir Mark Garthwaite and Victoria Tuzo (daughter of General Sir Harry Tuzo, the late former Deputy Supreme Allied Commander Europe and General Officer Commanding of the British Army in Northern Ireland during the early period of the Troubles). Garthwaite attended Benenden School.

== Career ==
Garthwaite joined the British Army as a fast-track gap year officer (with the rank of second lieutenant), serving in Canada and Germany as part of the 3rd Regiment Royal Horse Artillery and training as forward observation officer, because she "wanted to see the world but [...] didn't want first to spend six months in King's Road working in some hideous pub earning £3.50 an hour". While in the Horse Artillery, Garthwaite was editing the regimental newspaper. Garthwaite then attended St Hugh's College, Oxford University from 1999 until 2003, completing a Master's degree in Ancient and Modern History (specialising in Alexander the Great), while also becoming a lacrosse Blue, and was runner-up in the Guardian Travel Writing Prize 1999.

Two months after graduating from Oxford, Garthwaite travelled to Iraq as a freelancer without organisational backing, and without taking any of the "hostile environment" courses that most news organisations insist their staff take before deployment in conflict areas. She joined the independent start-up English-language left-wing newspaper the Baghdad Bulletin, where many of Garthwaite's colleagues were, like her, young public school and Oxbridge graduates. Garthwaite became the newspaper's Basra correspondent, and for most of her time in Basra, she was the only resident Western journalist. Garthwaite quickly became a sought-after freelancer contributing to media around the world - according to herself, she had a working knowledge of the Arabic language and often knew more about what was happening than Coalition forces; at this time, Garthwaite broke the story for Reuters and the Times of the death of Baha Mousa, an Iraqi civilian who died in British custody. The Bulletin shut down on 15 September 2003 due to financial and security concerns.

After taking some time out of journalism because of a back injury, Garthwaite was hired as an intern by the BBC in its current affairs division in spring 2004, and was then promoted to staff researcher. While at the BBC, Garthwaite presented occasional programmes for the BBC World Service, and worked on programmes for BBC Radio 4, BBC Radio 5 Live, and Newsnight. In January 2006, having done some producing at the BBC, she took the chance to join Al-Jazeera to help prepare for its English-language channel launch. Garthwaite became a full-time producer within a year, and in November 2006 moved to Doha in Qatar to help with the channel's launch, where she still lives today. She also helped to set up the Baghdad bureau.

Her first book, How to Avoid Being Killed in a War Zone (ISBN 1608195856) draws on her own experiences, and those of other journalists, to provide tips and expertise on how to survive in a war-torn country. It was published by Bloomsbury in 2011.

She now works as a producer for her own production company, Mediadante, in the Doha headquarters.

== Controversy ==
In September 2020, Rosie Garthwaite was under criticism for producing a documentary about Israel’s illegal occupation of East Jerusalem. And at the same time, Garthwaite was also found that she has retweeted a tweet which contained an image of four maps showing how Palestinian territory had diminished over the last century due to the illegal occupation. Garthwaite later was threatened as a result of the tweet and removed the picture from Twitter. BBC Director General Tim Davie issued a warning to journalists at the corporation of the introduction of strict new laws on their use of Twitter and other social media in order to stop rows over impartiality.
