= Reginald Denning =

British Army general (1894–1990)

Lieutenant-General Sir Reginald Denning KCVO KBE CB
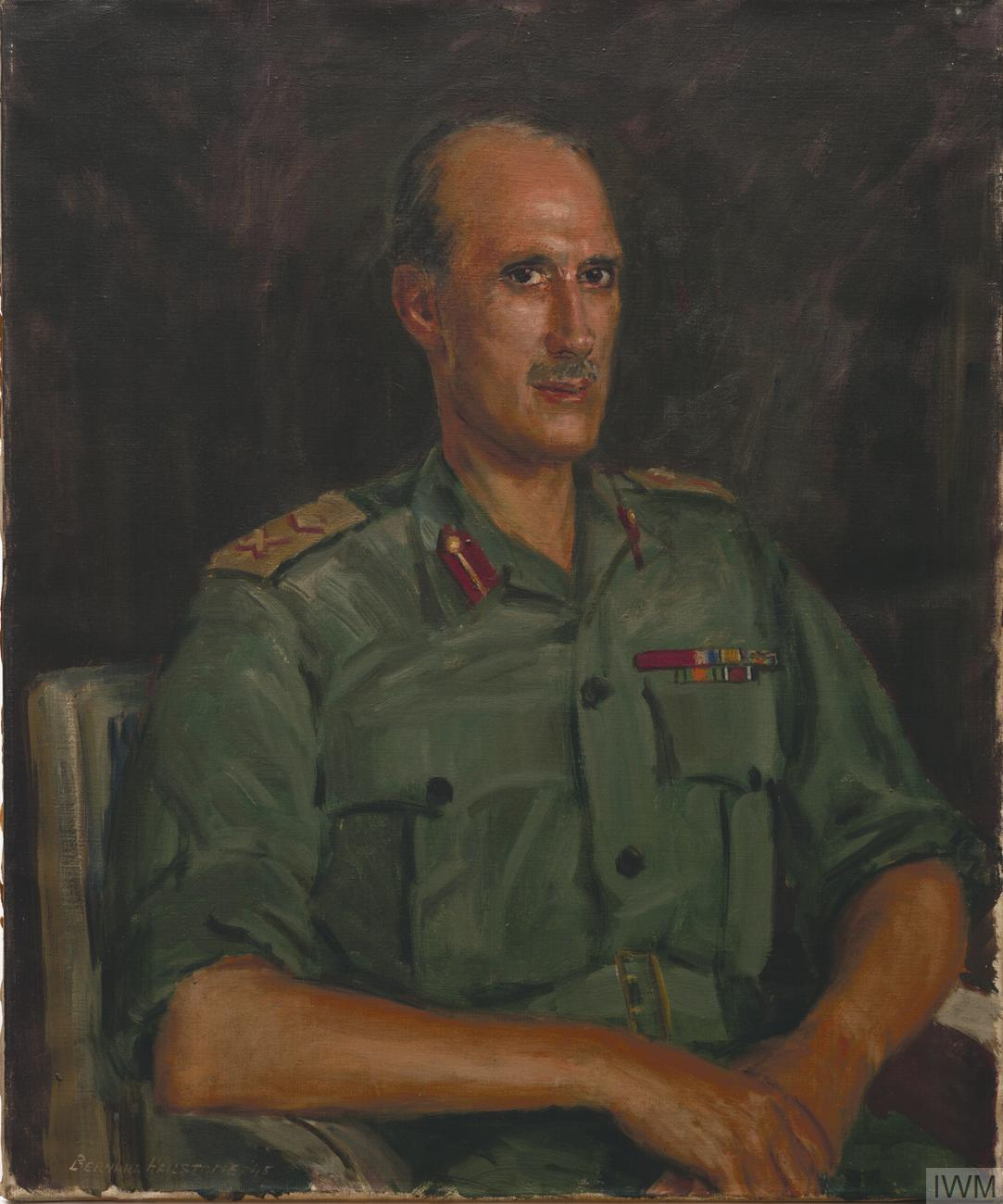
- Born: 12 June 1894; Whitchurch, Hampshire, England
- Died: 23 May 1990 (aged 95); Maidstone, Kent, England
- Military career
- Allegiance: United Kingdom
- Branch: British Army
- Service years: 1914–1952
- Rank: Lieutenant-General
- Service number: 10930
- Units: London Regiment; Bedfordshire and Hertfordshire Regiment
- Commands: Northern Ireland District
- Conflicts: First World War; Second World War
- Awards: Knight Commander of the Royal Victorian Order; Knight Commander of the Order of the British Empire; Companion of the Order of the Bath; Mentioned in Despatches

Lieutenant-General Sir Reginald Francis Stewart Denning, KCVO, KBE, CB (12 June 1894 – 23 May 1990) was a British Army staff officer and administrator.

== Military career ==
Reginald Denning was born in Whitchurch, Hampshire, in 1894 to Charles and Clara Denning. His siblings included Alfred Thompson "Tom" Denning and Norman Denning. He joined the British Army at the beginning of the First World War as a private with the Queen's Westminsters, and was sent to serve on the Western Front in 1914, where he was posted to Ypres. He initially refused to apply for a commission until his elder brother forced him to, and in 1915 he was commissioned in the Bedfordshire Regiment. On 15 June 1915 he was severely injured. After running forward in an assault against the enemy flank he spotted some soldiers hiding in a trench. Running over to confront them he was hit with a 'pole-axe blow' to the head, which turned out to be a bullet passing through his shoulder and into the back of his head. He was left for dead and recovered consciousness about twelve hours later. A corporal from his company picked him up and carried him to a field ambulance, and after surgery he was shipped back to England, where a metal plate was put in his head.

Denning recovered from his wound and returned to France in 1918 to join his regiment as a company commander, but the wound had taken its toll and he collapsed. After being sent back to base he was transferred to brigade headquarters with the Third Army. For the rest of the war he served as a staff captain at Third Army Headquarters, but was transferred back to his regiment in 1919 to take part in the training of the regiment. He served for six years as an adjutant, three years for each regular battalion, and in 1925 attended the Staff College, Camberley. After training he again returned to the Bedfordshire Regiment and served with the regiment in both India and England.

Denning left the regiment in 1936, again to join the staff, and helped prepare the British Expeditionary Force. After the Dunkirk evacuations he was appointed to the XI Corps defending South East England. He was promoted to major general in 1943 to lead the planning for D-Day; he asked to be demoted to brigadier so he would be allowed to take part in the landings themselves, but this request was denied. After the success of the operation he was posted to Far East Command and became Chief Administrative Officer for the south-east Asian campaign.

In 1947 Denning was made Chief of Staff Eastern Command and was made Colonel of the Bedfordshire and Hertfordshire Regiment. In 1949 he was promoted to lieutenant general and made General Officer Commanding Northern Ireland District.

Denning retired in 1952 with the rank of Colonel in the regiment and helped organise the merging of the county regiments into larger units, forming the Royal Anglian Regiment and serving as its first Colonel. After his retirement he became chairman of the Soldiers', Sailors' and Airmen's Families Association and worked with the organisation for over 20 years. He was made a Knight Commander of the Royal Victorian Order in thanks for his work. He was also a Deputy lieutenant for Essex between 1959 and 1968.

== Bibliography ==
- Denning, Alfred Thompson (1981). The Family Story. London: Butterworths. ISBN 9780406176097.
- Heward, Edmund (1990). Lord Denning: A Biography. George Weidenfeld & Nicolson Limited. ISBN 0-297-81138-X.
- Smart, Nick (2005). Biographical Dictionary of British Generals of the Second World War. Barnesley: Pen & Sword. ISBN 1844150496.

Military offices
Preceded by Sir Ouvry Roberts	GOC British Army in Northern Ireland; 1949–1952	Succeeded by Sir John Woodall
Honorary titles
New title	Colonel of the Royal Anglian Regiment; 1964–1966	Succeeded by Sir Richard Goodwin
