= Anthony Kimmins =

British film director (1901–1964)

Anthony Martin Kimmins OBE
- Photo by Anthony Buckley
- Born: 10 November 1901; Harrow, London, England
- Died: 19 May 1964 (aged 62); Hurstpierpoint, West Sussex, England
- Occupations: Film director/producer, playwright, screenwriter, actor

Anthony Martin Kimmins, OBE (10 November 1901 – 19 May 1964) was an English director, playwright, screenwriter, producer, and actor.

== Biography ==
Kimmins was born in Harrow, London, on 10 November 1901, the son of the social activists Charles William Kimmins and Grace Kimmins. He served in the Royal Navy, and upon leaving the navy, he became an actor. In 1932, he wrote the comedy play While Parents Sleep, which had a long run in the West End. In 1935, another of his plays Chase the Ace was staged.

His first directorial assignment was Keep Fit (1937) with George Formby. Michael Balcon called Kimmins "a gay and stimulating character, very much beloved by the studio staff and with an exceptional capacity for getting on with people, which was just as well, for Formby was not easy. Two men could hardly have been more unlike, but Tony managed to establish a working relationship."

During World War II, he returned to the Navy achieving the rank of commander. In 1941, he took part in Operation Claymore, a successful commando raid in Norway. During the success of the raid, Kimmins is said to have gone skiing on a nearby slope out of boredom, according to John Durnford-Slater. He later ran the British Pacific Fleet newspaper in Sydney during the Pacific War. Kimmins received the OBE in 1946.

After the war, he produced an eclectic mix of films, such as the psychological thriller Mine Own Executioner (1947), Bonnie Prince Charlie (1948), and Mr. Denning Drives North (1951). In the 1950s, Kimmins work included the Alec Guinness comedy The Captain's Paradise (1953) and the children's Smiley series of films which were made in Australia.

His final film as director harked back to his early days – it was a version of his stage successThe Amorous Prawn (US: The Playgirl and the War Minister, 1962).

He was the subject of This Is Your Life in 1961, when he was surprised by Eamonn Andrews at the BBC Television Theatre. His son, Simon Kimmins, played first-class cricket in the 1950s, primarily for Kent County Cricket Club.

He died in 1964, at his home in Hurstpierpoint in West Sussex, at the age of 62.

== Filmography ==
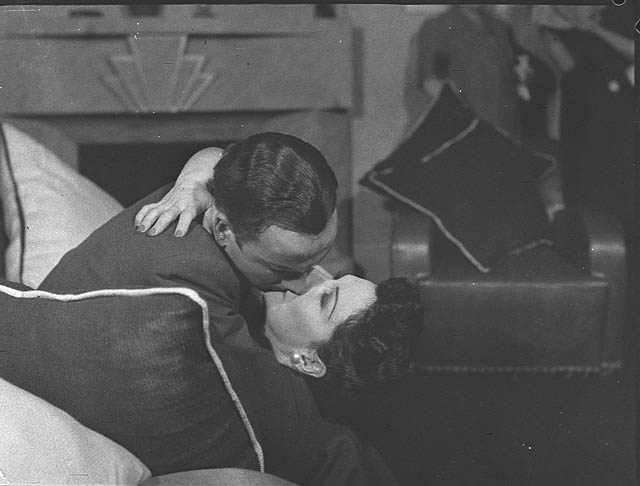
Still from the 1943 stage production of While Parents Sleep

- Two Wives for Henry (1933) – writer
- The Golden Cage (1933) – writer (uncredited)
- The Night Club Queen (1934) – play
- Bypass to Happiness (1934) – writer, director
- The Diplomatic Lover (1934) aka How's Chances? – writer, director
- Midshipman Easy (1935) – writer
- Once in a New Moon (1935) – writer, director
- While Parents Sleep (1935) – writer, play
- All at Sea (1935) – writer, director
- His Majesty and Company (1935) – director
- Talk of the Devil (1936) – writer
- Queen of Hearts (1936) – writer
- Scotland Yard Commands (1936)
- Laburnum Grove (1936) – writer
- Three Maxims (1936) – director
- Talk of the Devil (1936) – writer
- Keep Your Seats, Please (1936) – writer
- Lonely Road (US: Scotland Yard Commands, 1936) – writer
- The Show Goes On (1937) – writer
- Parisian Life (1936) – writer
- Who's Your Lady Friend? (1937) – writer
- Feather Your Nest (1937) – writer
- Good Morning, Boys (1937) – writer
- Keep Fit (1937) – writer, director
- I See Ice (1938) – writer, director
- George Takes the Air (1938) aka It's in the Air – writer, director
- Trouble Brewing (1939) – writer, director
- Come on George (1939) – writer, director
- Under Your Hat (1940) – writer
- Narcisse (1940) – writer
- Mine Own Executioner (1947) – director, producer
- Bonnie Prince Charlie (1948) – director
- Mr. Denning Drives North (1951) – director, producer
- Flesh and Blood (1951) – director
- The Passionate Sentry (1952) – director, producer
- The Captain's Paradise (1953) – director, producer
- Top of the Form (1953) – writer
- Aunt Clara (1954) – director, producer
- Smiley (1956) – director, writer, producer
- "While Parents Sleep" episode of Armchair Theatre (1957) – writer
- Smiley Gets a Gun (1958) – director, writer, producer
- The Amorous Prawn (US: The Playgirl and the War Minister, 1962) – director, writer (and original play)

=== Select theatre credits ===
- While Parents Sleep (1932)
