= Chailey Heritage School =

Special school in Sussex, England

Location
- Haywards Heath Road; Chailey, East Sussex, BN8 4EF; England; 50.9723°N 0.0302°W

Information
- Type: Special school
- Established: 1903
- Department for Education URN: 114682 Tables
- Ofsted: Reports
- Chief Executive: Gareth Germer
- Headteacher: Richard Green
- Gender: Coeducational
- Age: 3 to 19
- Enrolment: As of 2023, 85
- Capacity: As of 2023, 110
- Website: www.chf.org.uk

Chailey Heritage School is a special school located in North Chailey, East Sussex, England. It is owned and operated by the Chailey Heritage Foundation. The school is for children and young adults, aged between 3 and 19, with complex physical disabilities and associated learning difficulties. The school has a sixth form. It is a charity. There is boarding accommodation on the site. NHS services are based at the same location.

== History ==
Chailey Heritage School was founded in 1903 by Grace Kimmins and Alice Rennie for children with physical disabilities. The founding organisation was called the Guild of the Brave Poor Things. The school moved site three miles within Chailey in 1936.

The 2002 inspection noted that the school was choosing to admit children with increasingly complex levels of need.

== Buildings ==
The school has a chapel, St Martin's Chapel, which is a Grade II listed building. It was built in 1913; the architects were Ninian Comper and his son John.

== School performance and inspections ==
As of 2023, the 2014 inspection is the most recent, with a judgement by Ofsted of Outstanding. The school was judged Outstanding in the previous two inspections in 2009 and 2007. The 2002 inspection before that did not result in a judgement category, but the inspectors concluded that "The high quality of teaching and care, good achievement of pupils and sound leadership make this an effective school that provides good value for money".

The school has been recognised for good practice in several areas. It has a specialist service for young people aged up to 25, to support them to plan for the future. It has had, starting in 1995, a group supported by an advocate for young people to give their views. In 2005, the House of Commons noted that the school "is nationally recognised for its good practice guidance on intimate care for disabled children". In 2003 the school was noted to make good use of the internet to share information with parents.

== Chailey Heritage Clinical Services (CHCS) ==
Chailey Heritage Clinical Services (CHCS) is the NHS service co-located with Chailey Heritage School to provide clinical and therapeutic input on site and in children's own homes. In addition to their work at Chailey Heritage School they provide specialist services for children and young people with complex neurodisability throughout East and West Sussex.

== Chailey Heritage Foundation ==
The Chailey Heritage Foundation, which was founded as the Chailey Heritage, is an English charity that owns and runs the school. It was founded out of the Guild of the Poor Brave Things in 1903 by Dame Grace Kimmins. The foundation specialises in support of children and young people with complex physical disabilities and health needs - predominantly through the Chailey Heritage School. At one time the Heritage also owned and ran the Chailey Heritage Marine Hospital near to the village of Tide Mills.

Futures@Chailey Heritage is the charity's new transition service for young adults with physical disabilities and includes a Life Skills Centre.

=== Trustees ===
The list of trustees at the close of 2014 is:

- William Shelford DL (chair)
- Mike Atkinson (School Governor)
- Keith Chaplin (Governor)
- David Crowther
- Elizabeth Green (Governor)
- Lucinda Hanbury
- Verena Hanbury MBE, DL (President)
- Chris Jones
- Robin Meyer
- Jane Roberts

== Notable staff ==
- Richard Henry Coleman (from 1920)

Between 1906-1916 two matrons trained at The London Hospital organised the nursing care of the children. As matron they would have played a central role in the smooth running of the establishment. Chailey Heritage were employing reputable matrons of a high calibre from the largest voluntary hospital in England.

- Ethel Julian (1871-1958), Matron, 1906-1908. Julian trained at The London Hospital under Eva Luckes between 1900-1902.
- Florence Mary Glover (1874-1970), Matron, 1908 until at least 1916. Glover also trained at The London Hospital between 1902 and 1904, and remained there as a staff nurse, holiday sister and home sister until her promotion to Chailey.

== Searchlight Workshops ==
Searchlight was founded in 1933 by Matron Powell, successor to Dame Grace Kimmins, as a set of workshops and home to teach useful skills and formed under the auspices of the school. It located on Mount Pleasant, the hill behind the East Beach at Denton. Searchlight undertook printing and small assembly work as well as small scale woodwork. It participated in an East Sussex apprentice scheme. Its existence as a charity, number 210205, separate from the school terminated in 2011.

== Notable former pupils ==
- Ian Dury, musician and actor
- Peter Hull, paralympian
- Alison Lapper, artist
