= Grace Kimmins =

British writer (1870-1954)

Grace Kimmins DBE
- Born: Dame Grace Mary Thyrza Hannam; 6 May 1870; Lewes, Sussex, England
- Died: 3 March 1954 (aged 83); Haywards Heath, England
- Occupation: Writer
- Spouse: Charles William Kimmins (m. 1897; died 1948)
- Children: Brian Kimmins and Anthony Kimmins

Dame Grace Mary Thyrza Kimmins, DBE (née Hannam; 6 May 1870 – 3 March 1954) was a British writer who created charities that worked with children who had disabilities.

== Biography ==
Kimmins was born in Lewes, Sussex, the eldest of four children born to cloth merchant James Hannam and Thyrza Rogers. She was educated at Wilton House School in Bexhill.

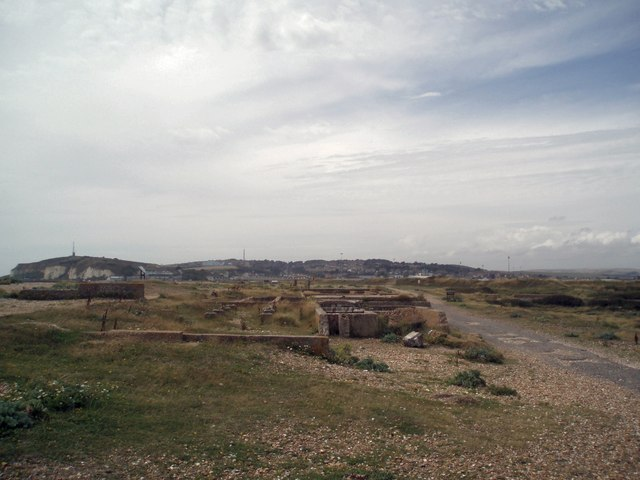
Ruins of Chailey Heritage Marine Hospital

Juliana Horatia Ewing's 1885 novel The Story of a Short Life inspired Kimmins to start the Guild of the Poor Brave Things to help children with disabilities in London. Grace (and later Ada Vachell took their motto Laetus sorte mea ("Happy in my lot") from Ewing's book. Kimmins was described in Punch as "... in her quiet practical way is probably as good a friend as London ever had".

She became a Wesleyan deaconess and worked in both the Methodist West London Mission and the Bermondsey Settlement, where she moved in 1895. In 1897, she married Charles William Kimmins. She was active in the foundation and continuance of charitable foundations, particularly those concerned with children's play and the welfare of poor and disabled children.

She founded, caused to be founded, or was involved in the Methodist West London Mission, Bermondsey Settlement, Chailey Heritage, Guild of Play, and Guild of the Poor Brave Things. She was also a writer; her only published novel, Polly of Parker's Rents (1899), explored children living in poverty.

== Honours ==
She was named CBE in 1927 and promoted to Dame Commander of the Order of the British Empire (DBE) in 1950.

== Family ==
Grace and Charles Kimmins had two sons:

- Lieutenant-General Sir Brian Charles Hannam Kimmins (30 July 1899 – 15 November 1979) was a British military commander who served as the General Officer Commanding Northern Ireland District.
- Anthony Martin Kimmins (10 November 1901 – 19 May 1964) was a British actor, director, and producer.

== Death ==
Dame Grace Kimmins died in Haywards Heath Hospital on 3 March 1954, aged 83.

== Bibliography ==
- Kimmins, Grace; Pearse, F. Mabelle (Illustrator) (1899). Polly of Parker's Rents. Kessinger Publishing. ISBN 978-1437225778.
- Kimmins, Grace (1928). Songs from the Plays of William Shakespeare with Dances. Novello and Co. ASIN B0000CY6X3.
- Kimmins, Grace (1948). Heritage Craft Schools and Hospitals, Chailey, 1903–1948. Baynard. ASIN B001ORGKQQ.
- Kimmins, Grace (6 January 2010). The Guild of Play Book of Festival and Dance (PT.1). Unknown. ISBN 978-1152560420. (Note: Posthumous publication)
- Kimmins, Grace (6 January 2010). The Guild of Play Book of Festival and Dance (PT.2). Unknown. ISBN 978-1152683068.
- Kimmins, Grace (1 August 2012). Peasant Dances of Many Lands. Lightning Source UK Ltd. ISBN 978-1290484572.
