= Ascham School =

Independent girls' school in Edgecliff, Sydney, New South Wales, Australia

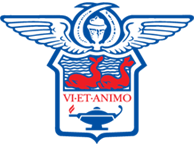

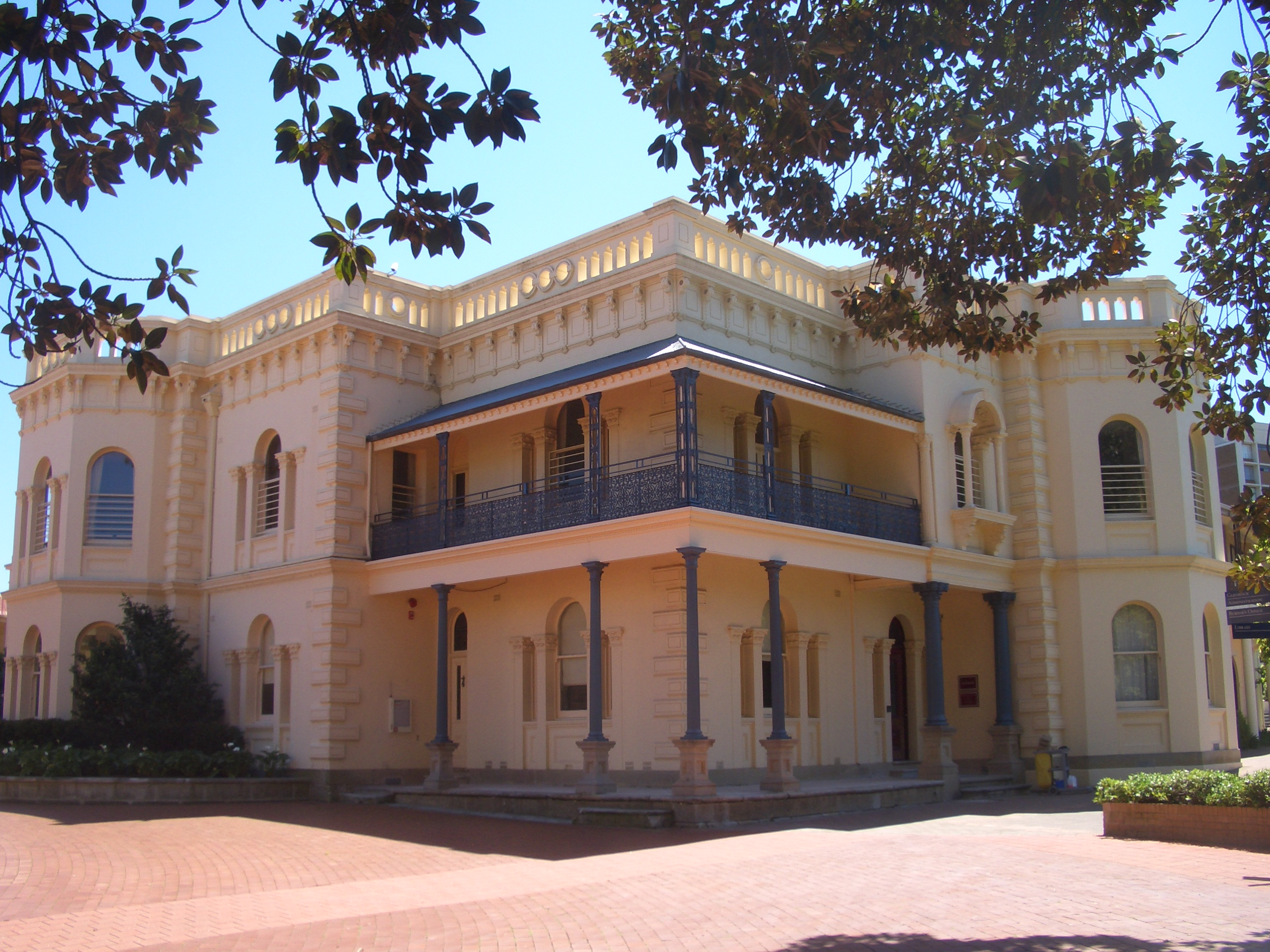
- Ascham's Edgecliff campus, in 2007

Location
- 188 New South Head Road; Edgecliff, New South Wales, 2027; Australia; 33°52′43″S 151°14′12″E

Information
- Type: Independent, day and boarding
- Motto: Latin: Vi Et Animo (With Heart and Soul)
- Established: 1886; 140 years ago
- Headmaster: Andrew Powell
- Teaching staff: 127.1 FTE (2019)
- Years: K–12
- Gender: Girls
- Enrolment: 1,181 (2019)
- Campus type: Urban area
- Colours: Navy blue, red and khaki
- Affiliations: Alliance of Girls' Schools Australasia; Junior School Heads Association of Australia; Association of Heads of Independent Schools of Australia; Australian Boarding Schools' Association; Association of Heads of Independent Girls' Schools
- Website: ascham.nsw.edu.au

Ascham School is an independent, non-denominational, day and boarding school for girls, located in Edgecliff, an Eastern Suburb of Sydney, New South Wales, Australia.

Established in 1886, the school has a non-selective enrolment policy and currently has approximately 1000 students from Kindergarten to Year 12, including 100 boarders from Years 6 to 12.

Ascham follows the 'Dalton Plan', an educational philosophy created by Helen Parkhurst in 1916. The 'Dalton Plan' aims to produce independent and confident leaders.

Ascham is a member of the Alliance of Girls' Schools Australasia (AGSA), the Junior School Heads Association of Australia the Association of Heads of Independent Schools of Australia (AHISA), the Australian Boarding Schools' Association, and the Association of Heads of Independent Girls' Schools (AHIGS).

Ascham is operated as a not-for-profit company. All funds must be used to benefit the school. This function is administered by the school's Council of Governors who are elected by the school's members.

== History ==
Ascham school was established in 1886 by Marie Wallis, as a private, day and boarding school for girls, in a terrace house in Darling Point. The school moved to its current site following the acquisition of Glenrock estate in 1911. The school was named after Roger Ascham, tutor to Queen Elizabeth I.

In 1914 Kathleen Gilman Jones (1880–1942) came from South Africa to be a joint head mistress at the school. She went on to lead Melbourne Church of England Girls' Grammar School.

The school adopted the 'Dalton Plan' as its method of teaching in 1922.

Ascham became a company, Ascham School Limited, in 1937 under the direction of Headmistress Margaret Bailey. This transferred ownership of the school from herself to ensure the long-term succession of the school. The next head who served the school for some time was Dorothy Whitehead. She had served in the war rising to the rank of temporary Major. She continued with the Dalton Plan, before she left in 1961 to lead Firbank Girls' Grammar School.

== School crest ==
The Ascham school crest was developed in 1911 by Ascham art teacher, Albert Collins. Symbols on the crest were explained in the school's Charivari magazine in December 1911: the dolphins symbolise energy, persistence and the ability to swim against, as well as with, the tide; the wings suggest aspiration and ambition; the lamp and book represent learning; and the combination of the acorn and eucalyptus seed mark the historical union of Britain and Australia.

== Campus ==
Ascham is composed of three school areas designed to accommodate for the different stages of the students' educational development.

Infant School

The youngest students, from Preparatory to Year 2, are taught in the Hillingdon building which has its own hall, library, classrooms and recreation area. The students at Hillingdon are taught according to the Spalding Method.

Junior School

Students from Years 3 to 6 live in the Fiona building. Junior School students have access to a broad range of school subjects and co-curricular activities.

Senior School

The senior school is for students from Year 7 to Year 12. They are taught according to the Dalton Plan. This method gives the older students increased flexibility while placing on them the responsibility to learn and participate in the school's numerous academic and cultural opportunities. The campus hosts the Packer Theatre, a studio theatre, an indoor heated pool, a gymnasium, tennis courts, playing fields, IT facilities, art rooms, science laboratories and three libraries.

== Exchange programme ==
Ascham has exchange programmes with the following girls schools: St Mary's Calne, UK; City of London School for Girls in London; Havergal College in Toronto; Nightingale-Bamford School in New York; Northlands School in Buenos Aires; Durban Girls' College in Durban; Institut de la Tour in Paris, St. George's School, Edinburgh, Scotland.

== Heads ==
The following individuals have served as Head of School, or preceding title:

Ordinal	Name	Title	Start date	End date	Time in office	Notes
1	Marie Wallis	Founding Principal	1886	1902	15–16 years	
2	Herbert J. Carter	Principal	1902	1914	11–12 years	
3	Kathleen Gilman Jones	Co-Principal	1914	1916	1–2 years	
3	Margaret Bailey	Co-Principal	1914	1916	1–2 years	
−	Margaret Bailey	Headmistress	1916	1946	29–30 years	
4	Hilda Rayward	Headmistress	1947	1948	0–1 years	
5	Dorothy Whitehead	Headmistress	1949	1961	11–12 years	
6	Merrilee Roberts	Headmistress	1962	1972	9–10 years	
7	Rowena Danziger	Headmistress	1973	2003	29–30 years	
8	Susan Preedy	Headmistress	2004	2005	0–1 years	
−	Rowena Danziger	Acting Headmistress	2005	2005	0 years	
−	Frances Booth	Acting Headmistress	2005	2005	0 years	
9	Louise Robert-Smith	Headmistress	2006	2012	5–6 years	
10	Helen Wright	Headmistress	2013	2014	0–1 years	
11	Andrew Powell	Head of School	2014	incumbent	11–12 years	

== Former students ==
=== Old Girls' Union ===
The Ascham Old Girls' Union (AOGU) was founded in 1899 by former students of the school. It now has a membership of over 4,000 alumnae. The AOGU encourages involvement of all past students in the Ascham community and helps alumnae remain in contact with their classmates. The AOGU also funds bursaries for the daughters and granddaughters of past students. The recipients of bursaries are means-tested and reviewed annually, and also carry an obligation to uphold the ideals and values of Ascham. The AOGU released three publications per year to its members.

=== Arts ===
==== Creative arts ====
- Beatrice Bligh (1916–1973), gardener
- Penny Meagher (1935–1995), a painter
- Yvonne Audette (1930–), abstract artist

==== Literary arts ====
- Marguerite Dale (1883–1963), playwright and feminist
- Mia Freedman (1971– ), journalist
- Sheridan Jobbins (1960– ), journalist, presenter and screenwriter
- Jill Kitson (1939–2013), literary journalist and broadcaster
- Sharri Markson (1984– ), journalist
- Saturday Rosenberg (1952–1998), screenwriter and comedian
- Debbie Whitmont, journalist

==== Performing arts ====
- Sylvia Breamer (1897–1943), actress
- Marta Dusseldorp (1973– ), actress
- Joanna McCallum (1950– ), actress
- Poppy Montgomery (1972– ), actress
- Lesley Piddington (1925–2016)
- Wendy Playfair (1926– ), actress
- Lynn Rainbow AM (1942– ), actress
- Ann Richards (1917–2006), actress and author
- Leila Waddell (1880–1932), violinist and magician
- Arkie Whiteley (1964–2001), actress
- Betty Who (1991– ), singer and songwriter
- Constance Worth (1911–1963), actress

=== Business ===
- Belinda Hutchinson AC, FRSN (1953– ), businessperson and philanthropist
- Lisa Messenger (1971– ), entrepreneur and author
- Gretel Packer AM (c. 1965– ), investor and philanthropist
- Lady Primrose Potter AC (1931– ), philanthropist
- Allegra Spender (1978– ), businessperson and politician
- Shemara Wikramanayake (1962– ), CEO of Macquarie Group.

=== Education ===
- Joan Bernard (1918–2012), the founding principal of Trevelyan College, University of Durham

=== Medicine and the sciences ===
- Nan Waddy AC, MBE (1915–2015), psychiatrist and mental health advocate

=== Sport ===
- Nikki Bishop (1973– ), equestrian event rider who competed in the 1996 Summer Olympics
- Gillian Campbell (1960– ), rower who competed at the 1992 Summer Olympics
- Paige Campbell (1996– ), steeplechase athlete
- Lavinia Chrystal (1989– ), skier who competed at the 2014 Winter Olympics
- Christine Davy MBE (1934– ), skier who competed at the 1956 and 1960 Winter Olympics
- Kitty Mackay Hodgson (1915–1974), swimmer who competed in the 1936 Summer Olympics
- Vicki Roycroft (1953– ), equestrian rider who competed at the 1984, 1988, and 1996 Summer Olympics

== See also ==
- List of non-government schools in New South Wales
- List of boarding schools
