= Dorothy Whitehead =

Australian headmistress (1908–1976)

- Born: Dorothy Eleanor Whitehead; 9 August 1908; Geelong, Victoria, Australia
- Died: 1 July 1976 (aged 67); Malvern, Victoria, Australia
- Education: University of Melbourne
- Occupation: headteacher
- Employer(s): Ascham School; Firbank Girls' Grammar School
- Known for: headteacher of Ashlam and Firbank schools

Dorothy Eleanor Whitehead (9 August 1908 – 1 July 1976) was an Australian headmistress. She served during World War II and then led Ascham School in Sydney and Firbank Girls' Grammar School in Melbourne.

== Life ==
Whitehead was born in 1908 in Geelong. Her parents had both been born in Australia. Her mother was Jessie (born Brown) and her father, James Whitehead, was a clerk. She graduated from the University of Melbourne as a qualified teacher but instead of teaching she worked as a secretary before the war. She was an army officer during the second world war after initially enrolling as a stenographer. She served from 1942 to 1945 and she became a lieutenant and temporary major. After the war she went into teaching and she received her master's degree from her alma mater in 1945.

Sydney's Ascham School had adopted the Dalton Plan in 1922 under the direction of Headmistress Margaret Bailey. The next head who served the school for several years was Whitehead. In 1955 she was elected to serve as the President of the Association of Heads of Independent Girls' Schools for a year.

Whitehead continued with the Dalton Plan at Ascham until in 1961, when she became the head of Firbank Girls' Grammar School in Melbourne. She served until 1970 and during her time the students were allowed more freedom. She continued with using the Dalton Plan at Firbank. She replaced exams with tests and removed the streaming of students. New buildings were introduced for physical education and to increase the boarding facility.

Whitehead died in 1976 in Malvern.
