= Firbank Grammar School =

School in Melbourne, Victoria, Australia

- Firbank Grammar School crest

Location
- 51 Outer Crescent; Brighton, Victoria 3186; Australia; 37°54′22″S 144°59′45″E

Information
- Type: Independent, day and boarding
- Motto: Latin: Vincit Qui Se Vincit (She conquers who conquers herself)
- Denomination: Anglican
- Established: 1909
- Founder: Archbishop Henry Lowther Clarke
- Sister school: Brighton Grammar School
- Chair: Jennine Ross
- Headmistress: Jenny Williams
- Chaplain: Christine Croft
- Key people: Ceri Lloyd (Head of Senior School); Melanie Smith (Head of Campus: Junior School, Turner House); Brad Nelsen (Head of Campus: Junior School, Sandringham House)
- Years offered: ELC–12
- Gender: Co-educational (Junior School); Girls (Junior School); Girls (Senior School)
- Enrolment: ~1,200 (ELC–12)
- Colours: Green, gold and white
- Slogan: Where all students find their place, now and for the future
- Affiliation: Girls Sport Victoria
- Website: firbank.vic.edu.au

Firbank Grammar School is an independent, Anglican, day and boarding school, situated in the suburb of Brighton, in the Bayside area of Melbourne, Australia.

Established on 26 April 1909, by the Anglican Archbishop of Melbourne, Henry Lowther Clarke, the school currently caters for approximately 1,200 students. The Early Learning Centre and primary school are co-educational, whilst the secondary school (years 7–12) is for girls only.

Firbank is a member of the Australian Anglican Schools Network, the British Schools and Universities Foundation and Girls Sport Victoria (GSV). Firbank has close ties with its brother school, Brighton Grammar School, a boys' school. Students of the two schools participate in a number of co-educational activities together such as music and drama.

== History ==
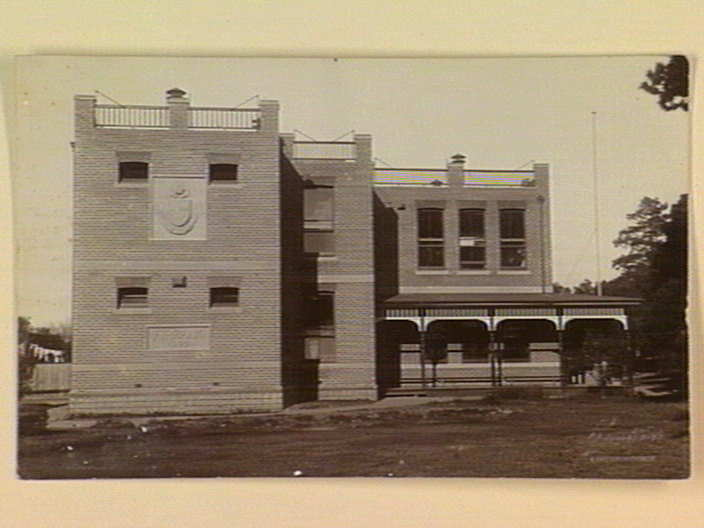
Firbank building, c. 1912

Firbank Grammar School was established as a Christian, day and boarding school for girls in 1909, by the Anglican Archbishop of Melbourne, Henry Lowther Clarke who was left a legacy for educational purposes. The Archbishop purchased 'Gawsworth', a property which stretched between Outer and Middle Crescents, and named the school after Firbank, his birthplace in Westmorland, England. He chose the motto, Vincit Qui Se Vincit ("She conquers who conquers herself") and gave the School his Archbishop crest.

The school opened and in 1910 there was an experienced head in charge. Florence Emily Green had founded and run the New England Girls' School before she sold it. She stood in as a temporary head until 1911 but she was in poor health.

Under the leadership of Maud Cameron, Firbank's longest serving Headmistress, enrolments grew and further land was purchased, including the 'Pen-y-bryn' estate and 'Atherstone' in Sandringham. Since its foundation, Firbank has maintained a strong connection with St Andrew's Anglican Church, Brighton where formal school services are held.

Dorothy Whitehead, previously head of Ascham School, served as head of school from 1961 to 1970 and during her time the students were allowed more freedom. She had previously taught with the Dalton Plan at Ascham and she replaced exams with tests and removed the streaming of students. New buildings were introduced for physical education and to increase the boarding facility.

In 2014, the school purchased The Pines for $3.25 million, a dilapidated concrete house that was built on Middle Crescent in Brighton in 1866. The school planned to demolish the structure and construct a sports centre on the site. However, following community objections and the listing of the building on the Victorian Heritage Register in January 2017, the school's plans were thwarted.

== Campus ==
Firbank consists of three educational sections on two campuses: 'Sandringham House', a co-educational primary school in Sandringham (ELC to Year 6); 'Turner House', a single sex girls primary school in Brighton (ELC to Year 6); and the Senior School a single sex girls secondary school in Brighton (Year 7 to Year 12). The houses are Sheppard Tyson, Aylwin Cameron, Tonkin Clarke and Hancock Crowther.

== Sport ==
Firbank is a member of Girls Sport Victoria (GSV). Firbank has competed in rowing since 1992. It has produced many nationally and internationally recognised swimmers.

=== GSV premierships ===
Firbank has won the following GSV premierships.

- Badminton (2) – 2008, 2015
- Diving (18) – 2001, 2003, 2004, 2005, 2006, 2007, 2008, 2009, 2010, 2011, 2012, 2013, 2014, 2015, 2016, 2017, 2018, 2019
- Soccer (4) – 2010, 2015, 2017, 2018
- Swimming – 2004
- Triathlon, Mini (2) – 2019, 2020
- Triathlon, Sprint – 2015

== Media ==
The Brighton campus was one of the sites for filming the 2005 television series We Can Be Heroes: Finding The Australian of the Year, in two episodes of the television production Neighbours in 2007, the film Any Questions for Ben? in 2012, Ja'mie Private school girl in 2013 and Upper Middle Bogan also in 2013.

== Notable alumnae ==
- Prue Acton – fashion designer
- Shaniera Akram – philanthropist, wife of cricketer Wasim
- Amanda Bateman – rower
- Marjorie Bick – biochemist
- Diana Bryant – Chief Justice of the Family Court of Australia
- Jane Bunn – meteorologist, Seven News
- Deb Cox – screenwriter
- Judy-Joy Davies – Olympic swimmer and journalist
- Beverley Dunn – actress
- Moya Dyring – artist
- Mavis Freeman – bacteriologist and biochemist
- Chris Gallus – politician
- Jennifer Hansen – former co-presenter, Channel 10 News
- Christie Jenkins – trampoline gymnast
- Amie Kaufman – New York Times bestselling author
- Kirstie Marshall, OAM – Labor MP for Forest Hill and former Aerial Skiing World Champion, also went to Mentone Girls' Secondary College
- Ida Elizabeth Osbourne, MBE – founder of A.B.C. Radio's national Children's Session
- Jeannette Patrick – politician
- Thérèse Rein – wife of former Australian Prime Minister Kevin Rudd and founder of employment agency Ingeus
- Susan Renouf – socialite
- Deborah Richards – journalist
- Nina Taylor – politician
- Hayley Verbunt – rowing coxswain
- Jan Wade – Attorney General in Jeff Kennett's government

== Notable staff ==
- Maud Cameron
- Dorothy Whitehead
- Kim Ravaillion

== See also ==
- List of schools in Victoria
- Anglican Church of Australia
