= Gertrude Walton =

Gertrude Mary Walton
- Born: 1 April 1881; Derby
- Died: 20 February 1951 (aged 69); Blackpool
- Education: University of Adelaide, The Sorbonne
- Employer: Methodist Ladies' College in Perth
- Predecessor: Maud Connell

Gertrude Mary Walton (1 April 1881 – 20 February 1951) was a British-born teacher, who was for a time headmistress of the Methodist Ladies' College in Perth. She was the longest serving head and she introduced the Dalton Plan to the school.

== Life ==
Walton was born in Derby. Her parents were Margaret Ellen (born Hanesworth) and James Pollitt Walton. James was a school teacher and a keen Methodist, who became the Chief School Inspector in Perth and in the following year her mother brought their five children to join him. Her private education took her to both the University of Adelaide and The Sorbonne in Paris. She had a degree from 1904 and for a year she taught in France.

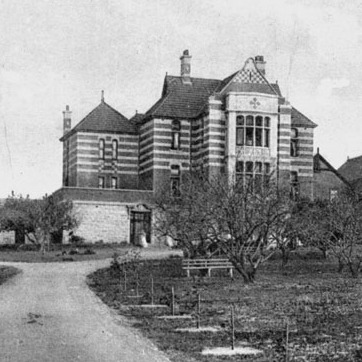
Perth's Methodist Ladies College in 1908

In 1917 she became the head of the Methodist Ladies' College, Perth taking over from the founding Maud Connell who has served from 1908 when the Methodist Church opened the school. Her brother was killed fighting in France in 1918.

Walton was the head but she was overseen by an all-male and Methodist school council who would demand to see her speeches before they were given.

Margaret Bailey introduced the Dalton Plan at Ascham College in 1922 but Walton had spent time in 1920 travelling in the UK and had introduced the idea a year before Bailey.

In 1936 Walton took a long holiday in Europe, being seen off by the school's old girls association. She attended the conference that year organised by the New Education Movement in the UK. In the following year she also attended the New Education Conference, which was in Perth.

== Retired and legacy ==
Walton retired in 1945 but her link to the school continued as she began to write its history. In 1949 her book, The Building of a Tradition, was published.

She had travelled throughout her life and in 1951 she died while in Blackpool in Lancashire.

In 1957 the school opened the Gertrude Walton Library which was later named the Gertrude Walton Centre.
