= Herbert James Carter =

Australian naturalist/ entomologist and teacher (1858–1940)

H. J. Carter
- Born: Herbert James Carter; April 23, 1858; Marlborough, Wiltshire, England
- Died: April 16, 1940 (aged 81); Sydney, Australia
- Education: Aldenham School; Jesus College, Cambridge
- Known for: Describing over 50 new genera and 1,200 species of beetles
- Scientific career
- Fields: Entomology (specializing in Coleoptera)
- Workplaces: Sydney Grammar School; Ascham School; Australian Museum
- Author abbrev. (botany): H.J.Carter

Herbert James Carter (23 April 1858 – 16 April 1940) was an English-born Australian schoolmaster and entomologist.

== Early life ==
Carter was born on 23 April 1858 at Marlborough, Wiltshire, England, the son of Mary Ann (née Freeman) and farmer James Carter. He was educated at Aldenham School, Hertfordshire and subsequently at Jesus College, Cambridge, where he graduated B.A. in 1881. He was also a keen cricketer.

== Career ==
Migrating to Australia (arriving on the Potosi on 19 February 1882) Carter was made assistant mathematics master at Sydney Grammar School, later becoming senior mathematics master.

In 1902, he became the second Principal of Ascham, a girls' school in Darling Point, having bought it from its founder, Marie Wallis. Under his leadership several properties were added to the campus. He focussed the curriculum on mathematics, natural history and singing but also introduced a class for students wishing to matriculate to university. Carter sold the school to Margaret Bailey in 1914 and retired from teaching.

During World War I, Carter became a founding member of the executive committee of the Australian branch of the British Red Cross Society.

Carter became an amateur collector of Coleoptera, which he pursued across New South Wales and interstate. His field trips included to Mount Kosciusko (1898, 1900 and 1905) and the Barrington Tops (1916 and 1925–27).

As an honorary entomologist at the Australian Museum, Carter described more than 50 new genera and 1,200 species.

His 1933 book, Gulliver in the Bush, has details about many of his field trips.

== Death and legacy ==
Carter died suddenly in Sydney on 16 April 1940.

Carter Place, in the Canberra suburb of Banks, is named in his honour.
