= Cheongna Dalton School =

- 청라달튼외국인학교

Location
- 344 Cheomdandong-ro; Seo-gu, Incheon 22742; South Korea; 37°32′48.97″N 126°37′23.01″E

Information
- Type: Foreign School
- Motto: Pioneer to Serve
- Established: 2011
- Founder: Bongduk Lee
- CEEB code: 682195
- Principal: Jiho Park
- Teaching staff: 72
- Grades: Pre-K to 12
- Enrollment: 502 students (2024-2025)
- Student to teacher ratio: 6.7:1
- Campus: Incheon
- Houses: Condors, Eagles, Raptors, Ravens
- Student Union/Association: Cheongna Dalton School Student Council
- Colors: Navy blue and Gold
- Athletics: CDS Basketball Team, CDS Soccer Team, CDS High School Varsity Sports
- Mascot: Phoenix
- Nickname: CDS
- Accreditation: WASC
- Newspaper: CDS Monthly Newsletter (compiled by the Student Council)
- Yearbook: CDS Yearbook (compiled by students in the Yearbook extracurricular activities)
- Website: www.daltonschool.kr

Cheongna Dalton School (CDS) is a secular international private college preparatory school situated in Cheongna, Incheon, South Korea, offering an American curriculum following the Dalton Plan in an English-only setting.

Cheongna Dalton School opened to students on September 1, 2011, and has classes from pre-Kindergarten to the 12th grade.

The present site is 46,200 m2 (11.4 acres or 497.292 sq ft) and is located in the Cheongna area.

The school has dormitories and the boarding program is available to middle and high school students. They share the philosophy of Dalton School in New York and accept the Dalton Plan that Helen Parkhurst established during her career. They have accreditation from WASC and the school provides AP system classes.

The Western Association of Schools and Colleges (WASC), based in California, accredited Cheongna Dalton School for a six-year term on July 2, 2012. As a condition of attending the school, a student is required to have at least one parent who holds a foreign passport, or the student must have been out of the country of Korea for more than 1,095 days at the time of enrollment.

== Campus and facilities ==
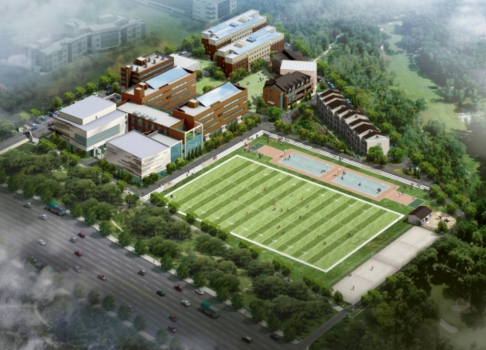
The school campus

The school has computers for student use, and all classrooms and facilities are fully networked. There are two libraries and several science laboratories. The auditorium, known as the Dalton Hall, is used for parent and teacher functions, fine arts productions and concerts, and it is equipped with lighting and sound systems. Music facilities include orchestra and choir rooms and sound-proofed practice rooms. Athletic facilities include a gymnasium, an equestrian course with four horses, a tennis court, a heated swimming pool, a soccer field with grass turf, and a dance room.

At the entrance of the school, there is a golden statue of Founder of Bongduk Education Foundation, Madame Bongduk Lee (1921–2010). The campus consists of the High School block, the Middle School Block, the "First Program" (Elementary), soccer field and residential facilities include the dormitory for students, and the Town House and Guesthouse for foreign teachers.

== Courses ==
Students in the school must attend Korean classes, World Language classes and extracurricular activities. In Middle School, basic subjects such as Pre-Algebra, Algebra 1, social studies, science and physical education. Those who take and pass the Math Exemption Exam would skip a year in the math curriculum. In addition, high school students, receive more opportunities of extracurricular activities such as band. Counseling sessions are offered for students, AP Courses and college counseling sessions are offered for High School students, so that they can find a suitable college to attend after graduating.

In CDS, there is a team championship known as the Dalton Cup, where students in different Dalton Cup teams compete in many subjects, such as sports, music, Accelerated Reader programs, writing competitions, and math competitions. The team in which achieves the highest score receives special prizes handed out to the team members.

Daily schedules are oriented according to the three principles of the Dalton Plan : House, Laboratory and Assignment. House is a session in the morning where students gather in their homeroom classes, and listen to announcements, upcoming events and reminders. The Laboratory, known as Lab Time, is a 30-minute session after first period, where students can visit teachers for assignments or talk with friends. There is also a period known as Silent Sustained Reading, or SSR, in which students must read a book silently for a duration of 30 minutes.

The school follows the six principles known as the 6Cs: Character, Curiosity, Critical Thinking, Communication, Collaboration and Community. The grades split into three categories which is the first program, Middle school, and the High school. The students who are grade 1 to 8 and have Korean nationalities are required to take a Korean language course. They have two house teachers in one class and the students have the opportunity to go to the university in Korea if they fill the 102 hours of studying Korean History and Korean. Every class is operated by about 70 minutes, with a 5-minute transition time. Also, the students from the school are mandated to do service works. In addition, they take foreign languages, Spanish or Chinese, just for the middle and high school students.

== Extracurricular activities ==
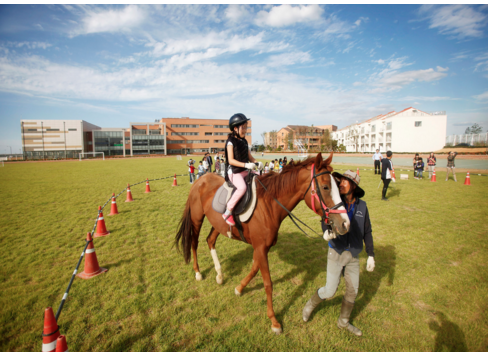
Horseback riding club

At the end of every Wednesday and Friday, there are clubs (also known as SOT) such as Fencing Club, Horseback Riding Club, and Film Club where elementary students can attend. In addition, the school provides sport activities such as basketball, soccer and swimming. The education of the school in the musical area is developed by the middle and high school orchestra. In addition, the school provides service learning projects. The school also offers the Winter school program for the elementary and the middle school students. After school programs(known as ASPs) include Drama Club, swimming, dancing, and horseback riding.

== Admission ==
The middle and high school students who want to attend the school need to take Math and English tests. However, the elementary students only need a document and an interview for admission. As a condition of attending the school, a student is required to have at least one parent who holds a foreign passport, or the student must have been out of the country of Korea for more than 1,095 days at the time of enrollment.

== College acceptance ==
The students from Cheongna Dalton school has around a 60% college acceptance from international universities. However, there were also some students who enrolled into Korean universities if the students had an early graduation. Half of the students stated that they wanted to go to Korean universities when they graduated from high school.

Some international universities students managed to get accepted are:

- Princeton University
- Cornell University
- Dartmouth College
- Northwestern University
- Emory University
- Johns Hopkins University
- University of California, Berkeley
- University of California, Los Angeles
- University of Michigan, Ahn Harbor
- New York University
- University of Wisconsin–Madison
- Washington University
- University of Southern California
- University of Hong Kong

And others

Other students who qualified for Korean universities attended:

- Seoul National University
- Yonsei University
- Korea University
- KAIST
- Postech
- Kyunghee University
- Hanyang University
- Kookmin University

And others
