= Dalton International =

Alternative education

Dalton International is a worldwide network of Dalton Plan schools and Dalton specialists. The alumni of Dalton school are called Daltonians. The Daltonian is also the official newspaper name of Dalton International.

== See also ==
- Dalton Plan
- The Dalton School
