= Joan Bernard =

Joan Constance Churchill Bernard, FRSA (6 April 1918 – 1 August 2012) was Principal of Trevelyan College, University of Durham from its foundation in 1966 to 1978. During World War II, she was an officer of the Auxiliary Territorial Service and was instrumental in Britain's defense against V-1 and V-2 rockets. In later life, she was active in the Church of England.

== Early life ==
Bernard was born on 6 April 1918, to Admiral Vivian Bernard and Eileen Mary Churchill. Her father was still married to his first wife when she was born, and only married Eileen Mary in 1926. She was educated at Ascham School, an independent girls school in Sydney, Australia. She studied Literae Humaniores at St Anne's College, Oxford. She graduated with a Bachelor of Arts (BA) degree in 1940, which was promoted to Master of Arts (MA (Oxon)) degree in 1943.

=== Military service ===
During World War II, Bernard served in the Auxiliary Territorial Service, specifically between 1940 and 1946. From 1940 to 1944, she was posted to Anti-Aircraft Command. On 30 May 1941, she was promoted to Second Subaltern (equivalent to second lieutenant), the first officer rank of the ATS. In the latter part of the war, between 1944 and 1945, she was based at Supreme Headquarters Allied Expeditionary Force. She served in SO Air Defense Division. Between July and November 1945, she was posted to Special Projectile Operations Group. There, she was involved in tactical planning of the defense against the V1 and V2 rockets: Operation Backfire was her initiative. She was mentioned in dispatches for her wartime service in 1945. By August 1945, she held the rank of Junior Commander (equivalent to captain).

== Career ==
In 1945, Bernard joined the scientific department of the National Coal Board. She was the departments admin officer. She served as Assistant Secretary (Education, Music and Drama) of the National Federation of Women's Institutes from 1950 to 1957. She returned to education in 1957 and began the study of theology at King's College London. She graduated Bachelor of Divinity (BD) in 1961.

In 1962, she became Warden of Canterbury Hall, a hall of residence of the University of London. She was also a part-time lecturer and tutor in theology at King's College London.

In May 1965, she was selected to become the founding principal of a new women's college of the University of Durham. She took up the post in January 1966, giving her nine months to prepare Trevelyan College for its first students. She was concurrently an Honorary Lecturer in Theology. She retired from university life in 1978.

== Later life ==
Bernard retired from Durham to London, where she lived within the diocese of Southwark Cathedral. As a devoted adherent of Anglicanism, she was a regular worshipper at the cathedral. She also became an active member of the national structure of the Church of England, serving as a Member of the Ordination Candidates' Committee, ACCM from 1972 to 1991. In addition, on a local scale, she was Examining Chaplain to the Bishop of Southwark from 1984 to 1994.

After a long period of ill-health, Bernard died on 1 August 2012. Her funeral was held at Southwark Cathedral on 30 August 2012.

== Personal life ==
Bernard never married nor had any children.

== Honours ==
In August 1945, Bernard was mentioned in dispatches 'in recognition of gallant and distinguished services in Northwest Europe'.

Bernard was elected a Fellow of King's College (FKC) in 1976. It is the most prestigious award the College can bestow. She was elected Fellow of the Royal Society of Arts (FRSA) in 1984.

Academic offices
New office	Principal of Trevelyan College, Durham; 1966-1978	Succeeded by Deborah Lavin
