= Stillman & Eastwick-Field Partnership =

British architectural firm

Stillman & Eastwick-Field Partnership (SEF) was an architects' firm based in London, founded in 1949 by the architects John Stillman and John and Elizabeth Eastwick-Field, a married couple. The firm made notable contributions to Britain's post-war reconstruction, first with schools and, hospitals, later with housing and university accommodation. Much of the firm's output displays a restrained 'New Brutalist' manner with robust detailing in brick and exposed concrete.

Elizabeth Eastwick-Field (née Gee) was born on 21 November 1919, and died on 8 March 2003 aged 83. John Eastwick-Field, OBE, was born on 6 December 1919, and died on 30 March 2003 aged 83. John Stillman was born on 27 May 1920 and died on 19 July 2021 aged 101.

The firm's three founding partners met in 1937 when studying at the Bartlett School of Architecture, University College London.

John Eastwick-Field was a tutor at the Architectural Association School of Architecture from 1946 to 1956, was part of the council there from 1956 to 1958, and was President between 1966–67. He was also on the council of the Royal Institute of British Architects for a decade from 1951.

John Stillman and John Eastwick-Field wrote together the book The Design And Practice of Joinery, first published in 1958.

The architects Terry Farrell and Nicholas Grimshaw met when working at SEF, before setting up in practice together.

== Buildings ==
- Lister House on Vallance Road in Tower Hamlets, 1956
- Camden School for Girls, London, 1957
- Hide Tower, a tower block of flats on Regency Street in Westminster, London, 1961
- Keele University Students' Union, 1963
- Mackintosh Hall, a cultural centre in Gibraltar, 1964
- LBH Training Centre, Hackney, London, 1964
- West of England (Residential) School for the Partially Sighted, Exeter, 1966
- Market Harborough, 1966
- Trevelyan College, Durham, 1968
- Clissold School (now Stoke Newington School and Sixth Form), Hackney, London, 1970
- Allington Park, Kent, 1970
- Ilfracombe School and Community College Ilfracombe, Devon, 1970
- Princess Marina Psychiatric Hospital, Northampton, 1972
- Witchwood House, Lambeth, 1976
- Development of Chase Farm Hospital in Enfield, Middlesex, 1976
- Working girls' hostel and day centre in Highbury, London, 1977
- Girls school, Gibraltar, 1977
- Kingswood Nursery School, Dulwich, 1966 (now demolished and called Dulwich Wood Nursery School)
