= Margaret Ann Bailey =

Australian headmistress

Margaret Ann Montgomery Bailey (9 June 1879 – 5 June 1955) was the headmistress of Ascham School in Edgecliff, New South Wales. During her 30 years as headmistress, her educational philosophy raised Ascham School to prosperity and prominence across Australia. The school totaled over 400 students at her retirement in 1947. She was an educator, world traveler, and women's activist.

== Life and career ==
Bailey was born at Toowoomba, Queensland. She was the eldest child of John Bailey, grazier, and his wife Jane, née McCurdy, who raised her in the Presbyterian faith. She graduated from the Newnham School for Girls in Toowoomba, and won an exhibition to the University of Sydney. She completed her baccalaureate in 1900, taught at various schools in the area, and later studied abroad in France.

While abroad, she discovered that she could not converse in the French language, despite having graduated with honors in French. This circumstance sparked her interest in language pedagogy, which she would research in Paris, Berlin, and London. She would later earn an education diploma from the University of London.

Bailey returned to Sydney in 1914, and bought Ascham School from former headmaster H. J. Carter. In 1916, she became an educationist at the school, and found opportunity to solve the school's problems pragmatically—for instance, purchasing student uniforms from army disposal outlets. She adapted the Dalton plan to her school in 1922, which was a year after Gertrude Walton used it her school in Perth. The plan's Montessori school inspiration, combined with the school's enthusiastic staff, saw the plan launched to great success. Bailey would also introduce the purchase and construction of several other buildings and classrooms to accommodate Ascham School's growing body of pupils.

In 1937, Bailey and a council of governors incorporated the school as a non-profit organization. She became an active member of the Headmistress' Association of Australia and the New Education Fellowship, later serving as vice-president and then president of the Sydney University Women Graduates' Association. Bailey retired in 1947, and died peacefully in Roseville, New South Wales in 1955.
