= Nigel Martin =

British politician and mathematician

Nigel Martin is a British politician and mathematician. He was a member of Durham County Council, representing Neville's Cross from 1985 to 2017. He is a Liberal Democrat, and was leader of the party in the council from 1989-2013. He was also a member of Durham City Council from 1995 to 1999, and from 2007 to 2009, when the council was abolished, and has been a member of Framwellgate Moor Parish Council since 2017.

== Life ==
Martin attended Clee Grammar School for Boys in Lincolnshire. He is an alumnus of the University of Cambridge, reading for his undergraduate degree and his PhD at Christ's College. He was also a Research Fellow at Downing College from 1971-1975.

He was a senior lecturer in the Department of Mathematical Sciences at Durham University, having joined the university in 1976 as Resident Tutor of Collingwood College, rising to Vice Principal before moving to Trevelyan College in 2000 as Principal. He retired from the university in 2008. His mathematical interest focused on graph theory and combinatorics.

Martin has run for Parliament three times: in 1987 for Newcastle Central, and in 1992 and 1997 for City of Durham. He also stood for election to the European Parliament in 1994 for County Durham and Blaydon.

Academic offices
Preceded by Malcolm Todd	Principal of Trevelyan College, Durham; 2000–2008	Succeeded by Martyn Evans
