= Deborah Lavin =

South African academic and historian (born 1939)

Deborah Margaret Lavin, FRSA (born 22 September 1939), is a South African academic and historian, resident in the United Kingdom for most of her career.

== Biography ==
Lavin was born on 22 September 1939. She attended Rhodes University, South Africa and Lady Margaret Hall, Oxford, graduating in 1961.

Lavin has lectured at the University of Witwatersrand as well as Queen's University Belfast and was a Senior Associate of St Antony's College, Oxford. In 1980 she relocated to Durham where she was co-director of the Research Institute for the Study of Change, and a lecturer in the Department of Modern History, as well as Principal of Trevelyan College from 1979 to 1995. She was President of the Howlands Trust and from 1995 to 1997 was Principal-elect of the new College to be developed at the Howlands Farm, which eventually became Josephine Butler College.

== Bibliography ==
- South African Memories: Scraps of History, Ad. Donker, 1979 (co-author)
- From Empire to International Commonwealth: A Biography of Lionel Curtis, Oxford, 1995
- The Condominium Remembered:Proceedings of the Durham Sudan Historical Records Conference 1982, University of Durham, Centre for Middle Easte, 1993

Academic offices
Preceded by Joan Bernard	Principal of Trevelyan College, Durham; 1979-1995	Succeeded by George Marshall
