= The Pines, Brighton =

Heritage-listed house in Melbourne, Victoria, Australia

The Pines
- Location of the former house in Greater Metropolitan Melbourne

General information
- Status: Completed; disrepair
- Type: House; School building (since 2014– )
- Architectural style: Victorian Italianate
- Location: 10 Middle Crescent, Brighton, City of Bayside, Melbourne, Victoria, Australia
- Coordinates: 37°54′24″S 144°59′54″E
- Completed: 1866; 160 years ago
- Client: William Durrant
- Owner: Firbank Grammar School (since 2014)

Technical details
- Material: Concrete; rendered bricks; timber; hipped slate; corrugated iron; rammed lime

Design and construction
- Architect: H. B. Foot
- Main contractor: William Durrant

Victorian Heritage Register
- Official name: The Pines, Brighton
- Type: Registered place
- Criteria: b., f.
- Designated: 12 January 2017
- Reference no.: H2364
- Heritage overlay no.: HO240
- Category: Residential buildings (private)

The Pines is a concrete building located at 10 Middle Crescent in Brighton, in the City of Bayside, in the south eastern suburbs of Melbourne, in Victoria, Australia. The building includes a former concrete house with rear brick and timber sections and two associated concrete out-buildings at the rear of the property. No longer used as a house, as of 2017, the structure was in a dilapidated condition.

Built in 1866 on the traditional lands of the Bunurong people, the house was added to the Victorian Heritage Register on 12 January 2017 in recognition of its historical and scientific significance.

== History ==
In 1840 the Colonial Office in England extended the system of 'Special Survey' to the District of Port Phillip to encourage immigration. It enabled wealthy capitalists to purchase a block of 2,112 hectares (5,220 acres) from England before survey, for £1 an acre, or £5,120. Henry Dendy was the first to take up the offer and the only person to do so from England. After arriving in Melbourne in 1841 he eventually settled on land in the County of Bourke, Parish of Moorabbin, and this land was mapped in April that year.

A competition, held for the design of this subdivision, was won by H. B. Foot in c. 1842 who presented a design based on concentrically centred crescents and a town reserve, as part of the Dendy Special Survey village. The Brighton Estate was advertised for sale at in May 1842, however early sales were slow and the estate only developed in the 1860s.

The Pines, Brighton was constructed in 1866 by local prolific builder and dairyman William Durrant on 4 hectares (10 acres) he owned in the Brighton Estate, between Middle and Outer Crescent, where he built seven cottages. The Pines was the second in a sequence of larger concrete houses built by Durrant and the first occupant was the squatter, Frank W. Desailly. By 1872 The Pines was used as a school known as Brighton College and it appears that a timber addition was constructed at the rear for this purpose. This school was initially conducted by John MacVean, then John Batten until 1881, and finally Arthur Backhouse until c. 1883.

Subsequently The Pines was used as a private residence until its 2014 acquisition, in a dilapidated condition, by Firbank Grammar School for $3.25 million. Two years later, Firbank made application to demolish the building and construct a sports centre on the site. However, the building was added to the Victorian Heritage Register in January 2017, thwarting the school's plans.

== Description ==
The Pines, Brighton is a concrete house with a hipped slate roof and brick and timber sections at the rear. It is a mid-Victorian Italianate villa with rendered walls which are lightly scribed to imitate ashlar construction. It has moulded chimney caps, quoined front corners, a central front door and tall paired double hung windows on either side. A concave roofed front verandah was modified with a replacement frame, concrete floor, and turned posts. The eaves have an unusual continuous rendered under-mould. The interior of the main house has a timber floor, plastered walls and ceilings, deep cornices and deep timber window reveals. At the rear of the main house are two sections, one of brick construction and a later addition to the west is of timber construction. To the rear of the property are two concrete outbuildings with corrugated iron roofs. It is recorded that the concrete used to form the walls of the house and outbuildings consisted of lime binding sand and stones from the nearby foreshore. This was rammed in layers before a rendered finish was applied.

== See also ==
- Architecture of Melbourne
- List of places on the Victorian Heritage Register in the City of Bayside
