= Jaime Bruinier =

Dutch footballer (born 1987)

Personal information
- Full name: Jaime Martijn Bruinier
- Date of birth: 28 June 1987 (age 39)
- Place of birth: Ugchelen, Netherlands
- Height: 1.85 m (6 ft 1 in)
- Position: Midfielder

Youth career
- Victoria Boys
- 1998–1999: AGOVV
- 1999–2006: Vitesse

Senior career*
Years	Team	Apps	(Gls)
2006–2009	Vitesse	3	(0)
2008–2009	→ AGOVV (loan)	29	(0)
2009–2011	AGOVV	61	(12)
2011–2014	Sparta	46	(7)
2014–2015	Abano	18	(0)
2015–2020	VVOG	50	(0)

International career
2002–2003	Netherlands U16	3	(0)
- * Club domestic league appearances and goals

Jaime Martijn Bruinier (born 28 June 1987) is a Dutch former professional footballer who played as a midfielder. He formerly played for Vitesse, AGOVV and Sparta Rotterdam.

== Club career ==
Bruinier made his debut in professional football as a member of the Vitesse squad in the 2006–07 season. On 3 March 2007, he came on the pitch for the first time as a substitute for the injured Onur Kaya in a 2–3 home loss to Excelsior. For the 2008–09 season, Bruinier was sent on loan to AGOVV. After the season, his contract with Vitesse expired and AGOVV signed Bruinier on a permanent two-year contract.

In 2011, he joined Sparta Rotterdam from AGOVV on a three-year contract.

In 2014–15 season, Bruinier signed with Abano, in the Italian fourth-tier Serie D. In summer 2015, he returned to the Netherlands to play for amateur side VVOG. He retired from football in 2020.

== International career ==
Bruiner has gained three caps for the Netherlands national under-16 team, making his debut against England U16 on 15 November 2002.

== Managerial career ==
After retiring as a player of VVOG, Bruinier joined the coaching staff of the club. He was appointed the assistant of the first team on 6 April 2020.
