= Mavis Freeman (scientist) =

Australian bacteriologist and biochemist

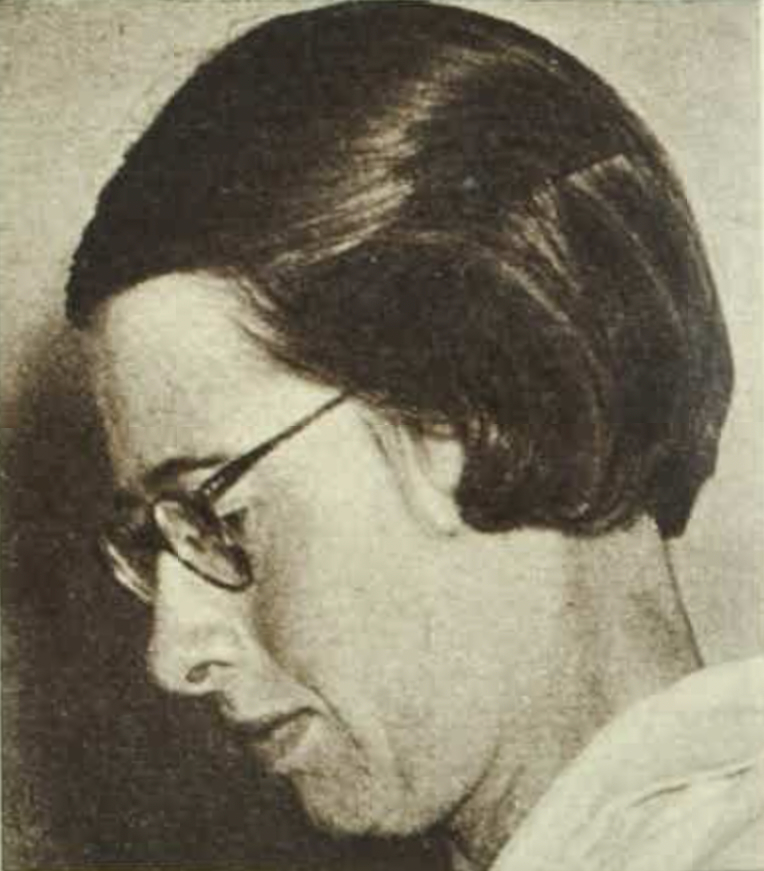
- Freeman in 1940
- Born: Mavis Louisa Freeman; 30 January 1907; Ballarat, Victoria, Australia
- Died: 1992 (aged 84–85); Malvern, Victoria, Australia
- Education: University of Melbourne
- Awards: Victorian Women Graduates' Association Travelling Fellowship, 1934
- Scientific career
- Workplaces: Walter and Eliza Hall Institute; Second Australian Military Hospital, Palestine

Mavis Louisa Freeman (30 January 1907 – 1992) was an Australian bacteriologist and biochemist. She assisted Macfarlane Burnet in identifying the source of Q fever.

== Early life and education ==
Mavis Louisa Freeman was born in Ballarat, Victoria on 30 January 1907 to Louisa (née Lutzen) and Harry Stanley Freeman. She completed her primary education at Esperance Girls' School, Brighton where she was dux of classes III and IV. She then attended Firbank Girls' Grammar School where she was dux of the school in 1924. On leaving school she won a scholarship to Trinity College at the University of Melbourne from which she graduated with a BSc in 1928.

== Career ==
Freeman's first job was at the Walter and Eliza Hall Institute where she was employed as a research fellow. Her work included studying snake venoms with Charles Kellaway and proteins with biochemist H. F. Holden.

In 1934 she won the Victorian Women Graduates' Association Travelling Scholarship and went to London to continue her studies at the Lister Institute. She returned to the Walter and Eliza Hall Institute and, in 1939, assisted Macfarlane Burnet in the discovery of the source of Q fever.

In World War II she was appointed as pathologist to the Second Australian Hospital, A.I.F. in Palestine and was the only woman to serve overseas, other than nurses and masseuses.

Freeman returned to the Walter and Eliza Hall Institute after the war but resigned in 1948 and moved to Adelaide to work at the Institute of Medical and Veterinary Research. She completed an MSc at the University of Melbourne in 1950.

Freeman died in Malvern, Victoria in 1992.
