= Vivian Bernard =

Royal Navy Admiral (1868–1934)

Admiral Vivian Bernard CB
- Bernard in 1917
- Born: 30 August 1868; Simon's Town, British Cape Colony
- Died: 18 February 1934 (aged 65); Rose Bay, New South Wales
- Alma mater: Stubbington House School
- Children: Joan Bernard
- Military career
- Allegiance: United Kingdom
- Branch: Royal Navy
- Service years: 1882–1922
- Rank: Admiral
- Commands: HMS Argonaut; HMS Revenge; Gunnery School, HMNB Devonport; HMS Argyll; HMS Venerable; HMS Neptune; Portland Harbour; Rear-Admiral Reserve Fleet, The Nore
- Conflicts: First World War; Battle of Jutland
- Awards: Order of the Crown of Italy (Italy); Legion of Honour (France); Order of the Sacred Treasure (Japan)

Admiral Vivian Henry Gerald Bernard CB (30 August 1868 – 18 February 1934) was a senior British Royal Navy officer.

== Early life ==
Bernard was born 30 August 1868, Simon's Town, Cape of Good Hope, British Cape Colony, to Inspector-General John Bernard of the Royal Navy. He was educated at Stubbington House School, boys' preparatory school.

== Military career ==
Bernard joined the Royal Navy on 15 July 1882 as a naval cadet. He became a midshipman on 15 January 1884. He was promoted to sub-lieutenant on 25 February 1888, and to lieutenant on 25 February 1889. He qualified as a gunnery lieutenant in 1893, having attended training at HMS Excellent. He was promoted to commander on 30 June 1901. He then served in the Department of Naval Intelligence, Admiralty. On 26 June 1906, he was promoted to captain, and given command of HMS Topaze, a Topaze-class cruiser. In August 1907, he took command of HMS Argonaut, a Diadem-class cruiser. A year later, in August 1908, took command of HMS Revenge,(later renamed HMS Redoutable), a Royal Sovereign-class battleship - He commanded the Gunnery School at HMNB Devonport between 1910 and 1912. He commanded the Devonshire-class cruiser HMS Argyll from May 1912 to June 1914.

Bernard saw active service in World War I. In August 1914, he took command of HMS Venerable, a Formidable-class battleship. He commanded HMS Venerable in operations off the Belgian coast between 1914 and 1915. He and HMS Venerable then took part in the naval operations of the unsuccessful Dardanelles Campaign. He then joined the operations of the Italian Adriatic Squadron, commanding HMS Venerable for the rest of 1915. In February 1916, he took command of the dreadnought HMS Neptune. He fought in the Battle of Jutland. He received a number of decorations for his role as commander of one of the dreadnought battleships.

He was promoted to rear-admiral on 26 September 1917. He was relieved of his command of HMS Neptune in October 1917. He became Captain of Portland Harbour in November 1917. From March 1920 to March 1921, he held the appointment Rear-Admiral Reserve Fleet, The Nore.

On 15 November 1922, he was promoted to vice-admiral and placed on the retired list the following day. On 1 August 1927, he was promoted to admiral.

== Later life ==
Having lived in Australia for two years, Bernard died on 18 February 1934 in Rose Bay, New South Wales. His funeral took place on 19 February at St Mark's Anglican Church in Darling Point, New South Wales. Following the service, he was cremated at the Rookwood Crematorium.

== Personal life ==
Bernard was married twice. In 1900, he married Ida Marie Gilles in Woollahra, New South Wales. Together they had one child, a son. She died in 1925. In 1926, he married Eileen Mary Churchill (née Power), widow of Major W. M. Churchill, Indian Army. They had a daughter in 1918, Joan Bernard, while he was married to his previous wife.

He was a devout Anglican and regular church goer.

== Honours and decorations ==
In March 1916, it was gazetted that he had been mentioned in dispatches for 'operations between the time of the landing on the Gallipoli Peninsula in April 1915 and the evacuation in December 1915—January 1916'. He was further mentioned in dispatches for 'service in the Battle of Jutland'.

It was gazetted in August 1916, that he had been appointed Commander of the Order of the Crown of Italy by the King of Italy 'in recognition of valuable services rendered'. It was gazetted in September 1916, that he had been appointed Officer of the Legion of Honour by the President of the Republic of France 'in recognition of [his] services during the war'. In the 1918 New Year Honours, he was appointed Companion of the Order of the Bath (CB). It was gazetted in August 1919, that he had been appointed to the second class of the Order of the Sacred Treasure by the Emperor of Japan 'for distinguished services rendered during the war'.

He was appointed Aide-de-Camp (ADC) to the King on 3 July 1917.
