= Marjorie Jean Lyon =

(1905-1975) surgeon and prisoner of war

Marjorie Jean Lyon OBE (13 February 1905 – 27 March 1975) was an Australian surgeon and prisoner of war from Western Australia.

Between 1937 and 1950 she was employed by the Malayan Medical Service and, between 1942 and 1945, was a Japanese prisoner of war. As a prisoner she medically cared for more than 2,500 women and children whom, throughout their three and a half years of captivity, had a remarkably low death rate.

== Early life and medical career ==
Lyon was born in Northam, Western Australia and was the daughter of Patrick Pearson Lyon, who worked as a barrister, and Jeanie Dunlop (née MacMaster) Lyon. She attended school at Northam State School and Methodist Ladies' College and she was dux at both.

She went on to study medicine at the University of Sydney and, in 1928, graduated with both a bachelor of medicine and bachelor of science. The same year she also won the Dagmar Berne Prize.

Following her graduation Lyon worked as a resident medical officers at a number of Sydney hospitals until, in the early 1930s she moved to the United Kingdom. There in 1934 she qualified as a member to the Royal College of Obstetricians and Gynaecologists and in 1936 became a fellow of the Royal College of Surgeons of Edinburgh.

== Time as a prisoner of war ==
On 30 July 1937 Lyon took a role with the Malayan Medical Service and she was based in Johor Bahru in 1942 when, as a part of World War II and the Japanese occupation of Malaya, the Japanese advanced and she was relocated to Singapore.

In Singapore she worked alongside fellow doctor Elsie Crowe at the general hospital there and worked primarily in the shock ward. She was there until ordered to evacuate and travelled, alongside Crowe, on the HMS Kuala which was sunk on 14 February 1943 near Pom Pom Island. Lyon was injured in the sinking but was able to swim to the island where she was first treated by Crowe, who Lyon had saved from drowning, and then immediately began helping care for the other injured people.

From there they were rescued by the Kofuku Maru who took them to Sumatra from which they travelled to Padang. Despite knowing the risks Lyon stayed there until the occupation by Japanese forces who took her as a prisoner of war. As a prisoner she was the doctor to the other prisoners there which included approximately 2,500 Dutch women and children and around 50 British people. They were initially located at the hospital there until, after numerous moves, being placed in a jungle camp at Bangkinang.

She was a prisoner for three and a half years and, alongside Crowe, ensured the health of those there as much as possible and, during their captivity, only 160 deaths were recorded. During her internment Lyon, and the nurses, were determined to keep accurate records of their time there and used a large silk panel which they used to embroider their names, dates and the various locations that they were moved. As this record was 'distinctly feminine' it avoided detection by the guards and, when needed, could be disguised as a piece of handiwork.

Additionally Lyon's diaries, which were later published as: These are my war time diaries: Sumatra 1942–1945 (1990), serve as an important record of this period of the war.

Following the surrender of Japan in 1945 Lyon was evacuated to Singapore and, soon after, returned to practice with the Malayan Medical Service until 1950.

In 1946 Lyon was awarded an Officer of the Order of the British Empire in recognition of her role in the war and the assistance she offered to so many.

== Later life and death ==
Lyon returned to Australia in 1950 where she worked as a doctor in Perth until her retirement in 1970.

She died on 27 March 1975 in Nedlands.
