= George Marshall (academic) =

George Marshall was Principal of Trevelyan College, University of Durham from 1995 to 1996, having been Acting-Principal from 1993.

== Academic career ==
Marshall was Senior Tutor of Trevelyan College from 1989 to 1992. In 1992, he was appointed Vice-Principal of the college. He served as Acting-Principal from 1993, and was Principal from 1995 to 1996.

As a scholar, his interests are mainly concerned with literature and also religious history. Among his writings is In a Distant Isle: Orkney Background of Edwin Muir, published in 1987.

Academic offices
Preceded by Deborah Lavin	Principal of Trevelyan College, Durham; 1995-1996	Succeeded by Malcolm Todd
