= Adekunle Adeyeye =

Nigerian academic and university administrator

Adekunle Olusola Adeyeye (born 1 May 1968) is a Nigerian academic and university administrator, announced in July 2019 as principal of Trevelyan College, Durham University.

== Biography ==
Originally from Nigeria, Adeyeye received his first degree from the University of Ilorin, in Kwara State, Nigeria, before moving to the UK to study for a master's degree in microelectronics engineering at the University of Cambridge, followed by a PhD in physics at the university's Cavendish Laboratory in 1996.

In 1996, he was the first Nigerian elected as a research fellow at Trinity College, Cambridge, but left in 1997 to take up a 9-month post as a senior research engineer at the Data Storage Institute, a research and development organisation established by the National University of Singapore, before returning to Trinity College. In 2000, he was a founding researcher at the Information Storage Materials Laboratory at the National University of Singapore, becoming a full professor in 2012. In 2014, he became the first head of Ridge View Residential College, the University of Singapore's first residential college outside University Town.

In 2002 he was cited by Technology Review as one of their 100 innovators under 35 "whose work and ideas will change the world". He is a fellow of the Institute of Physics and the Institute of Nanotechnology, and was an IEEE Magnetics Society Distinguished Lecturer in 2013. In 2018, Adeyeye was elected to fellowship of the American Physical Society "[f]or contributions to synthesis and characterization of magnetic nanostructures and their applications in low power magnonic information processing."

Since January 2020 he has been Principal of Trevelyan College, Durham, and Professor of Physics at Durham University.

He is married to Adefolake and has a daughter and two sons.

== Bullying controversy ==
In August 2021 The Guardian newspaper published an investigation into Adeyeye's alleged bullying and harassment of staff. He was accused of bullying, misogyny and frequently reducing his staff to tears. It was reported that within 16 months, two members of staff had filed formal grievances against Adeyeye and three resigned amid concerns over his behaviour. After being approached by The Guardian newspaper, Adeyeye stepped down from Durham University's bullying policy committee.

The Durham branch of the University and College Union released a statement saying the case highlighted "extremely important structural issues" at the university, alongside tweets stating "If the behaviour is found to be as alleged, we regard it as shocking and cannot accept it as a union", while Durham Students' Union expressed solidarity with staff and students at the college, saying "a lack of specific action risks normalising unacceptable behaviours". University newspaper Palatinate reported that over 20 alumni had pledged to withhold donations from Durham University while Adeyeye remains in post.

In September 2021, staff and students, including student leaders representing almost 8,000 members of the Durham University student body, signed an open letter accusing Durham University of apathy towards bullying in response to Adeyeye's alleged conduct.
