= Malcolm Todd (archaeologist) =

British archaeologist

- Photograph of Malcolm Todd
- Born: 27 November 1939; Durham, England
- Died: 6 June 2013 (aged 73); Exeter, England
- Spouse: Molly Tanner (after 1964)
- Children: 2

Academic background
- Education: St David's College, Lampeter; Brasenose College, Oxford
- Academic advisor: Ian Richmond

Academic work
- Discipline: Archaeology
- Sub-discipline: Classical archaeology
- Institutions: University of Nottingham; University of Exeter; Trevelyan College, Durham
- Main interests: Archaeology of Roman Britain; Archaeology of Germanic peoples in the Migration Period

Malcolm Todd FSA (27 November 1939 – 6 June 2013) was an English archaeologist. Born in Durham, England, the son of a miner, Todd was educated in classics and classical archaeology at St David's College, Lampeter and Brasenose College, Oxford. He subsequently served as a reader and professor at the University of Nottingham and the University of Exeter respectively. During this time, Todd conducted notable excavations at sites of Roman Britain. He was later principal at Trevelyan College, Durham. Todd retired from Durham in 2000, and subsequently dedicated himself to research and writing. He was the author and editor of several works on the archaeology of Roman Britain and the Germanic peoples in the Migration Period.

== Early life ==
Malcolm Todd was born in Durham, England, on 27 November 1939, the son of Wilfrid Todd and Rose Evelyn Johnson. Durham was at the time a characteristic mining and farming community, and his father was a miner.

== Education ==
Todd went to grammar school in Hartlepool. Encouraged by his father, who did not want his son to become a miner, he received his Bachelor of Arts (BA) degree in classics from St David's College, Lampeter, and a diploma in classical archaeology from Brasenose College, Oxford, in 1963. Among his teachers at Oxford were Ian Richmond. He was later awarded a Doctor of Letters (DLitt) degree by Lampeter.

== Career ==
=== Early career ===
During his studies, Todd became strongly interested in the archaeology of the Rhine provinces of the Roman Empire, and from 1963 to 1965 he worked as a research assistant at Rheinisches Landesmuseum Bonn under Harald von Petrikovits. Todd married Molly Tanner on 2 September 1964, with whom he had a daughter and a son.

=== University of Nottingham: 1965–1979 ===
Todd was lecturer (1965–1974), senior lecturer (1974–1977) and reader (1977–1979) in archaeology at the University of Nottingham. He became known as a capable and inspiring lecturer. While at Nottingham, Todd carried out excavations at Ancaster, Margidunum and medieval Newark-on-Trent. He became a corresponding member of the German Archaeological Institute in 1977. Todd was visiting professor at New York University in 1979.

=== University of Exeter: 1979–1996 ===
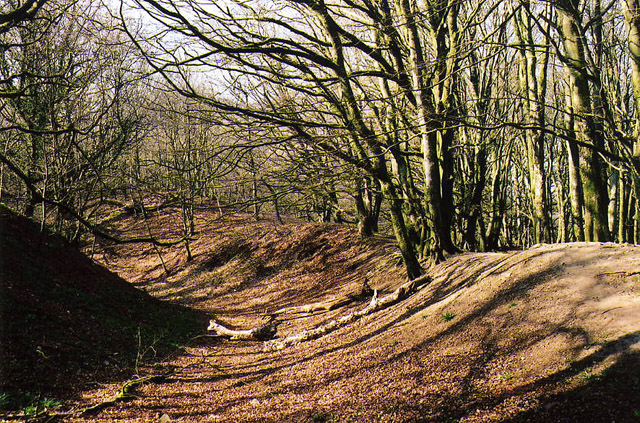
Ramparts inside the hillfort at Hembury, where Todd uncovered a previously unrecognised Roman occupation

In 1979, Todd was appointed professor of archaeology at the University of Exeter. He was the first archaeologist appointed a professor at Exeter since the teaching of archaeology had been established there some years earlier under Aileen Fox. While at Exeter, Todd specialized in the archaeology of the late Roman Empire and the Migration Period, urbanism in early Europe, and relations between the Roman Empire and "barbarians". It was while at Exeter that he carried out his most notable archaeological fieldwork. Todd uncovered a previously unrecognised Roman occupation of the Iron Age hillfort in Hembury. At Bury Barton he identified two Roman sites, including a fort. Todd also researched Roman mining of lead in the Mendips. He found evidence of Roman galena ore extraction at Charterhouse-on-Mendip.

Combined with his duties at Exeter, Todd was active in the broader scholarly community. He was a visiting fellow at All Souls College, Oxford, in 1984. Todd was editor of Britannia for five years, and was later chairman of its editorial committee, which also oversees the publishing of the Journal of Roman Studies. He was vice-president of the Roman Society from 1985 until his death. Todd was on the Royal Commission on the Historical Monuments of England from 1986 to 1992, and on the council of the National Trust from 1987 to 1991. From 1990 to 1991 he was visiting fellow at Brasenose College, Oxford, and a senior research fellow at the British Academy. Todd was trustee of the Roman Research Trust from 1994 to 1999. He was a Fellow of the Society of Antiquaries of London.

=== Trevelyan College: 1996–2000 ===
In 1996, Todd returned to his hometown to become principal of Trevelyan College, Durham. He simultaneously held a part-time post tasked with extending the Department of Archaeology. During this time Todd was also an archaeological consultant to Durham Cathedral. Under his leadership, significant changes were made to the management structure of Trevelyan, new fellowships, scholarships and awards were introduced, and its buildings were renovated.

== Last years ==
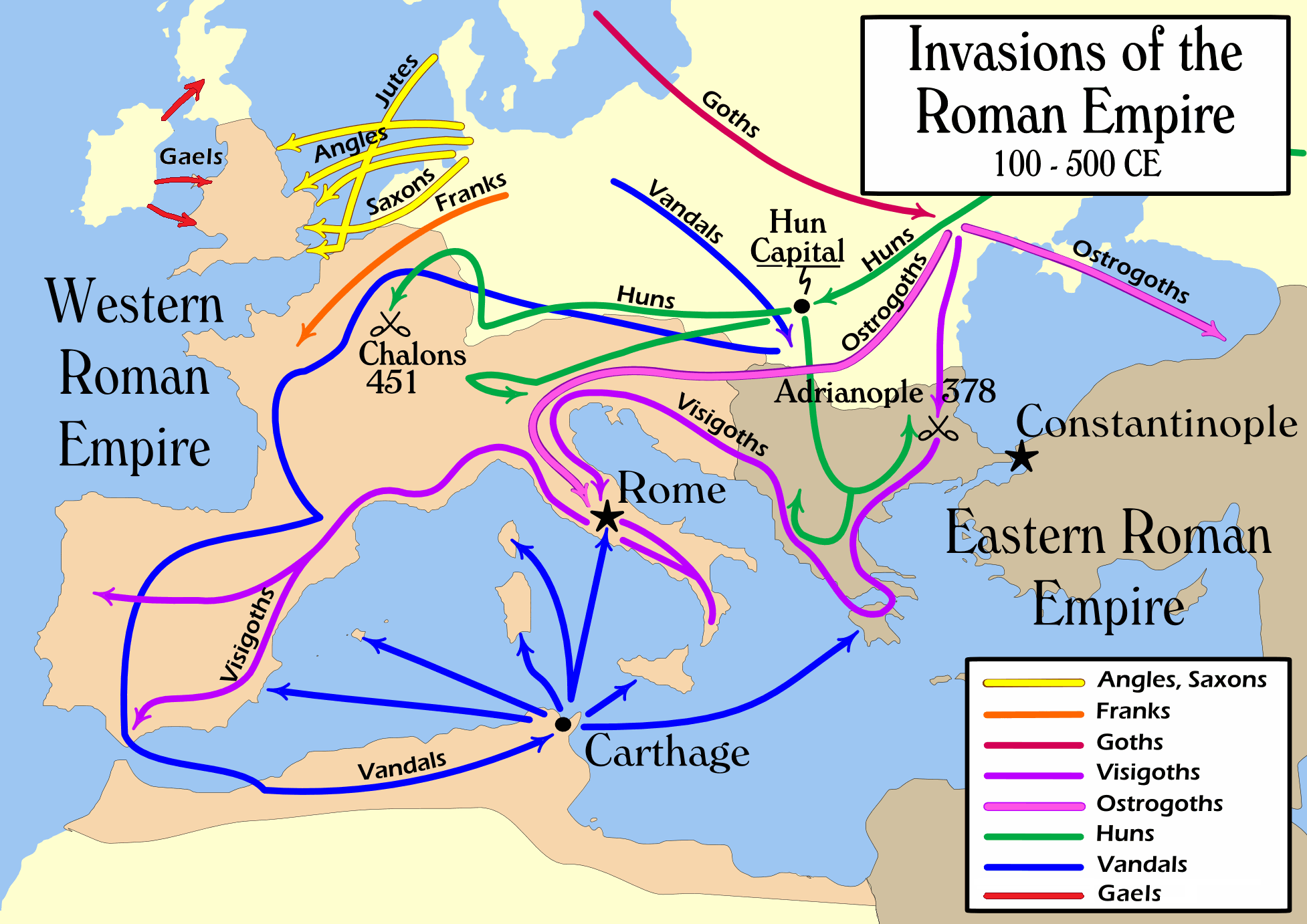
Map of tribal movements of the Migration Period. Todd was recognised as one of the world's leading experts on the archaeology of the period.

Though well liked by many of his students, Todd had little patience with administrative work, and had an ambivalent view on the digitization of academia. As a result, he took an early retirement from Trevelyan in 2000, which enabled him to focus entirely on writing and research.

After his retirement Todd returned to Exeter, where he continued to own a house. During this time he edited and published Companion to Roman Britain (2004), which has been referred to by The Times as an essential work. He also published the results of his excavations at Charterhouse-on-Mendip.

Todd died of a heart attack on 6 June 2013. Throughout his career, he was the author of numerous books and scholarly articles, and also wrote entries for works such as the Encyclopædia Britannica, Cambridge Ancient History and Oxford Dictionary of National Biography. His bibliography includes three books about the Germanic peoples, on whom he was considered to be a leading expert. Several of these were translated into multiple languages, such as French, German and Italian. His books also covered topics related to the Roman Empire, including the Aurelian Walls, Roman currency, populated places of Britain, Romano-British tribes, and the end of Roman rule in Britain.

== See also ==
- John F. Drinkwater
- Guy Halsall
- Peter Heather
- Bryan Ward-Perkins

== Selected works ==
- Everyday Life of the Barbarians: Goths, Franks and Vandals. Batsford. 1972. ISBN 0713416890.
- The Coritani (1 ed.). Duckworth. 1973. ISBN 0715606492.
- The Northern Barbarians (1 ed.). Hutchinson. 1975. ISBN 0091222206.
- The Walls of Rome. Elek. 1978. ISBN 0236401084.
- Studies in the Romano-British Villa. Leicester University Press. 1978. ISBN 0718511492.
- Roman Britain (1 ed.). Fontana. 1981. ISBN 0006337562.
- The Northern Barbarians (2 ed.). Blackwell. 1987. ISBN 0631151591.
- The South West to AD 1000. Longman. 1987. ISBN 0582492734.
- (Editor) Research on Roman Britain, 1960-89. Society for the Promotion of Roman Studies. 1989. ISBN 0907764134.
- The Coritani (2 ed.). A. Sutton. 1991. ISBN 0862998786.
- The Early Germans (1 ed.). Blackwell. 1992. ISBN 0631163972.
- Roman Britain (2 ed.). Penguin. 1995. ISBN 0140241116.
- Roman Britain (3 ed.). Wiley. 1999. ISBN 063121464X.
- Migrants & Invaders: The Movement of Peoples in the Ancient World. Tempus. 2001. ISBN 0752414372.
- (Editor) Companion to Roman Britain. Wiley. 2003. ISBN 0631218238.
- The Early Germans (2 ed.). Blackwell. 2004. ISBN 1405117141.
- Roman Mining in Somerset. The Mint Press. 2007. ISBN 978-1903356517.

Academic offices
Preceded by George Marshall	Principal of Trevelyan College, Durham; 1996–2000	Succeeded by Nigel Martin
