= Jill Kitson =

Australian radio broadcaster and literary journalist

Jill Kitson (10 January 1939 – 13 May 2013) was an Australian radio broadcaster and literary journalist.

Jill Middleton Cameron was born an only child in Sydney. She attended Ascham School, becoming school captain, then majored in history and political philosophy at the University of Sydney. Working in London, she met Michael Kitson, marrying him in New Zealand in 1964, and having two sons, Michael and Max. They also worked in Japan, before returning to England. Her book The British to the Antipodes was published in 1972. They returned to Australia in 1974, living in Melbourne.

Among other things, she broadcast the Lingua Franca programmes on Australia's ABC (Australian Broadcasting Corporation) radio. She also presented the literary programmes "First Edition" and Book Talk (1998–2006).

She previously worked as a literary editor for the publisher McPhee Gribble and was a judge of the Miles Franklin Award, an Australian award for fiction, and the Australian/Vogel Literary Award, an award for a work of fiction by a writer under 35 years. On retirement in 2005, she moved to Wentworth Falls, New South Wales, and joined the board of Varuna, The Writers' House in Katoomba.

Jill Kitson died on 13 May 2013 at home. She was 74.
