= Zendstation Ugchelen =

Tower in Ugchelen, Netherlands

Coordinates: 52.1681°N 5.8966°E

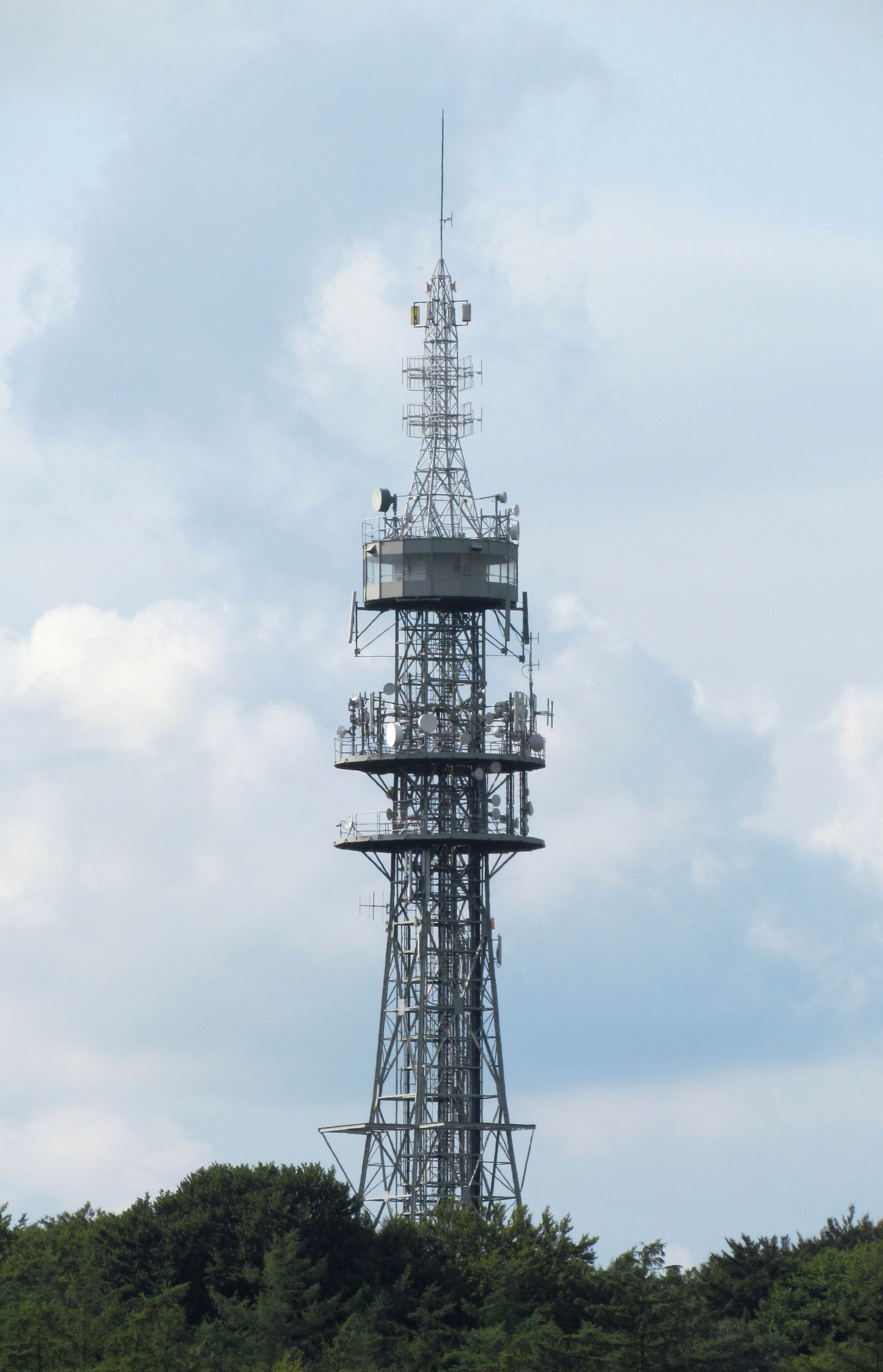
Transmission tower Ugchelen (2013)

Zendstation Ugchelen is the designation of a facility for FM- and TV-broadcasting at Ugchelen, Netherlands. Zendstation Ugchelen uses as transmission tower a 70-metre-high (230 ft) freestanding lattice tower built in 1958. It stands on top of the 80-metre-high (260 ft) Ugchelse Berg. It is owned by Cellnex.

== See also ==
- Lattice tower
