= Dalton School Hong Kong =

Private school in Hong Kong

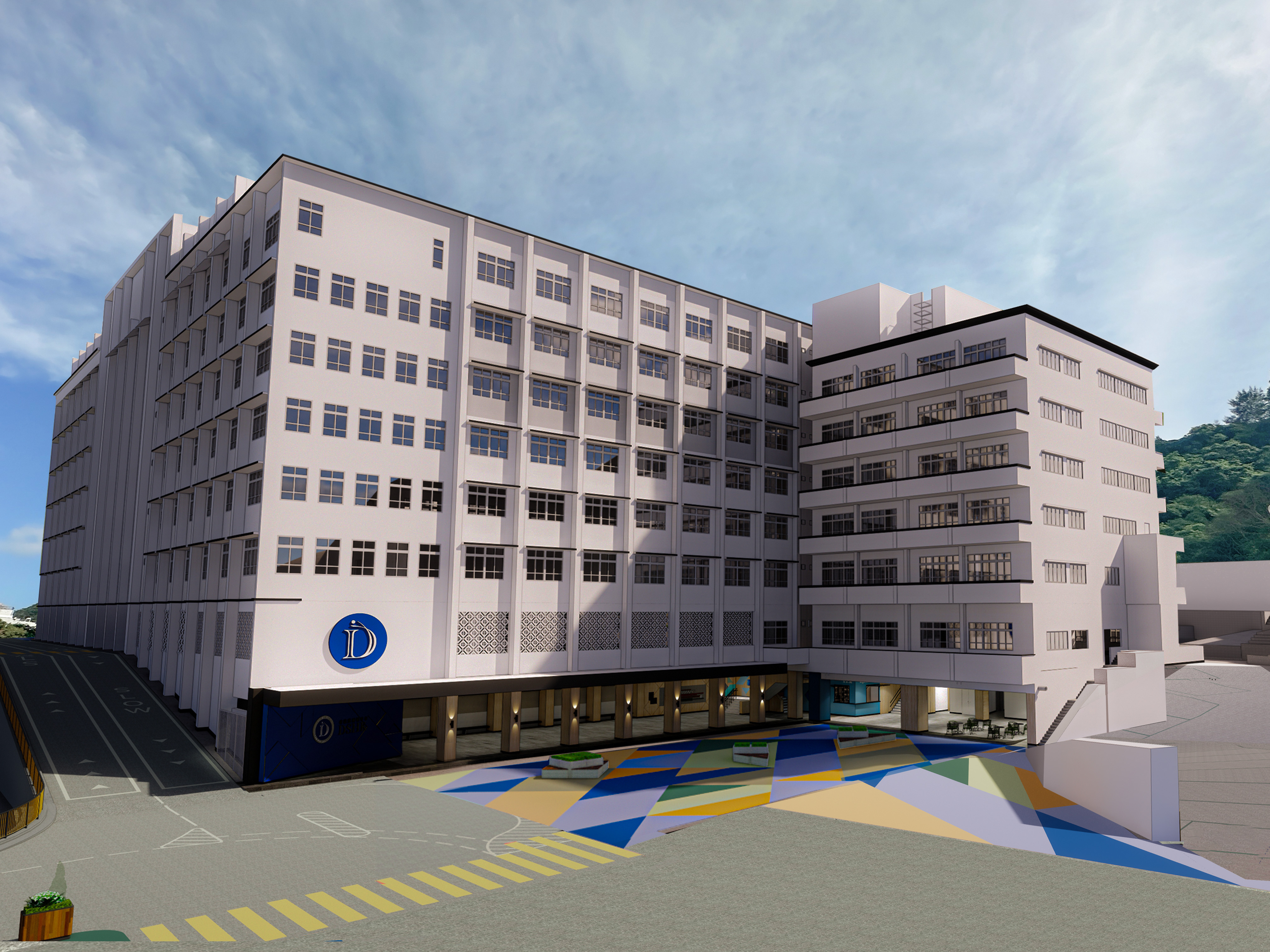
- Dalton School Hong Kong's Stubbs Road Campus, showcasing the main building

Location
- 41B Stubbs Road, Wan Chai, Hong Kong; Hong Kong

Information
- Other names: DSHK
- Type: Private, day
- Motto: I am not led, I lead.
- Established: 2017
- Principal: Shaun Porter
- Grades: Primary
- Gender: Coeducational
- Website: dshk.edu.hk

Dalton School Hong Kong (DSHK; traditional Chinese: 香港道爾頓學校; simplified Chinese: 香港道尔顿学校) is a non-profit, private independent primary school which offers dual-language education in English and Mandarin, following the Dalton Plan.

== History ==
DSHK was established in August 2017 at 10 Hoi Fai Road, Kowloon, by its school sponsoring body, the Dalton Foundation. The effort was backed by the China Everbright Charitable Fund, Sun Hung Kai & Co. Foundation, CITIC Group's Capital Charitable Fund, and Value Partners.

In 2024, DSHK and its community, including Little Dalton Kindergarten, miniDalton playgroup, moved into a new campus on 41B Stubbs Road, Mid-Levels, Hong Kong. It provides an all-through education from toddler to Grade 12, with the first cohort of graduates expected in 2030.

== Admission ==
DSHK operates independently of the Education Bureau’s Primary One Admission System (POA), requiring parents to apply directly to the school. Applications are accepted from students of all nationalities, religious beliefs, and ethnic backgrounds. The school also accepts students with Special Educational Needs (SEN).

== Curriculum ==
The curriculum follows the Dalton Plan, which emphasizes individualized learning. DSHK provides dual-language education in English and Mandarin. The English curriculum follows the U.S. Common Core standards and the Chinese curriculum is designed in collaboration with Tsinghua University Primary School (THPS), utilizing their teaching materials adapted to a local context. Project-based learning features prominently starting in the upper primary grades. The school operates with a future-focused vision, and sets out as its missions to cultivate learners rooted in traditional Chinese values, critical thinking skills and a global outlook. Its high school curriculum is poised to be a groundbreaking model in Hong Kong, and is designed to take its student-centered, individualized approach to its fullest by catering to unique matriculation pathways.

== Students ==
Class size ranges from 18 to 20 students, resulting in a teacher-student ratio of 8:1. The student body comprises 20 different nationalities, with 40% non-local students. Inclusivity is highly valued. SEN students receive dedicated support and integrate with whole-school events.
