= Methodist Ladies' College, Perth =

School in Claremont, Western Australia

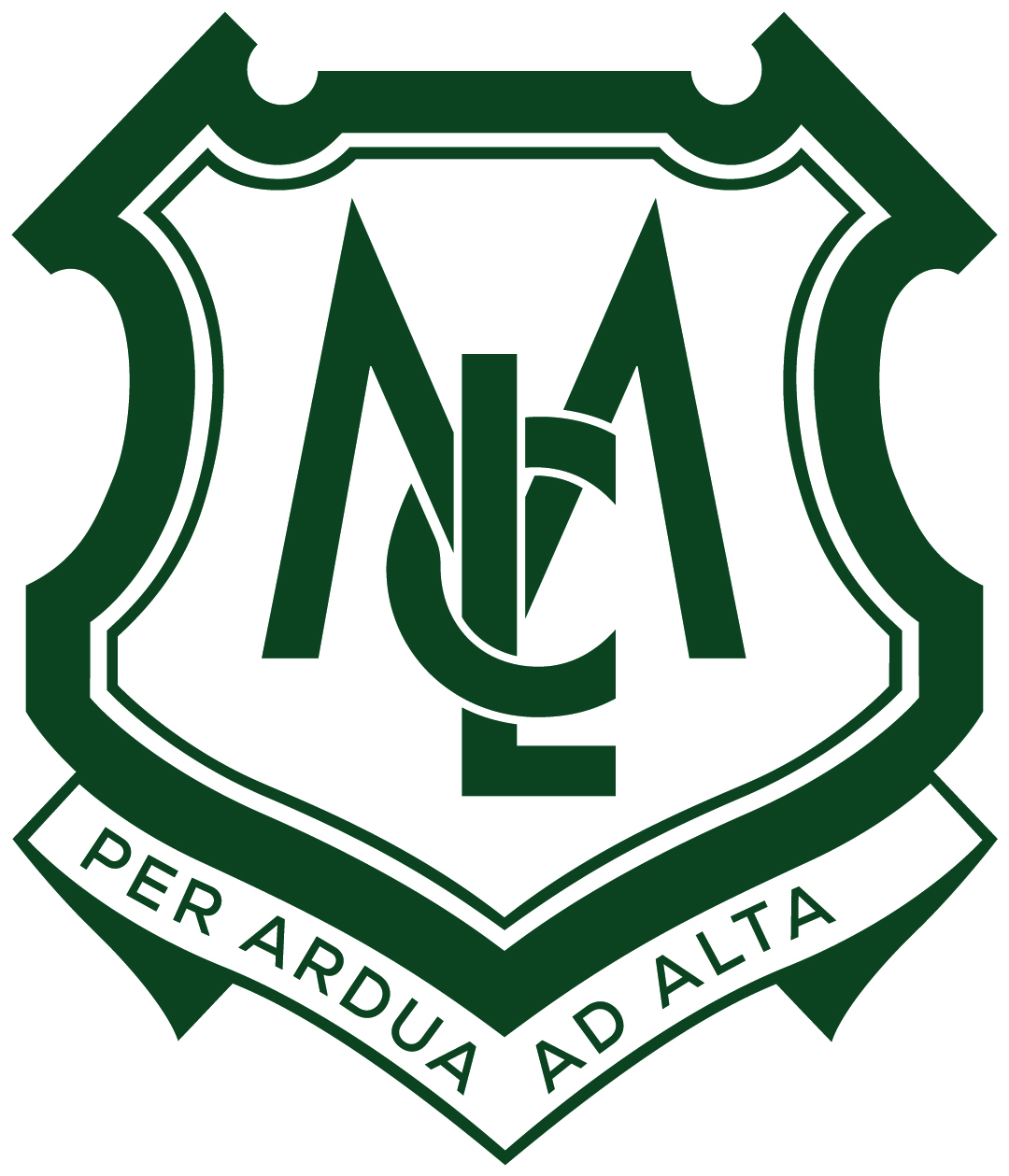

Location
- 356 Stirling Highway; Claremont, Western Australia, 6010; Australia; 31°59′12″S 115°46′31″E

Information
- Type: Independent, day and boarding
- Motto: Latin: Per Ardua Ad Alta (Through Striving to the Heights)
- Denomination: Uniting Church
- Established: 1907
- Chairperson: Lucia Cade
- Principal: Rebecca Clarke
- Chaplain: Simone Smalley
- Years: Pre-kindergarten – Year 12
- Gender: Girls
- Enrolment: 1,170 (2016)
- Colours: Green, purple and silver
- Affiliation: Independent Girls Schools Sports Association
- Website: www.mlc.wa.edu.au

Methodist Ladies' College, Perth (MLC Perth), is an independent, Uniting Church, day and boarding school for girls, in Claremont, a western suburb of Perth, Western Australia.

Founded by the Methodist Church of Australia in 1907, MLC is a non-selective school, and in 2024, it had about 1,040 girls from pre-kindergarten to Year 12, including 90 boarders.

The college was ranked as the number one TEE school in the state for 2006 and 2008 seeing 55.1 percent of students achieving a mark of seventy five percent or above in at least one subject.

== History ==
The foundation stone of the Methodist Ladies' College was laid, and building began in 1907, by the Methodist Church of Australia. Classes were first commenced in February 1908 with 31-day girls and 23 boarders.

The early traditions of the college were established by Maud Connell, Head Mistress from 1908 to 1913, who chose the colours of green and gold, and the school motto Per Ardua Ad Alta, which may be translated from Latin as "Strive for the Highest". She was succeeded by Gertrude Mary Walton who allowed students to learn at their own pace using the Dalton Plan. In 1917, MLC's first university students graduated from the University of Western Australia, which had begun teaching in 1913. Walton retired in 1945 when the Dalton Plan was still in operation. During her retirement she wrote a history of the school and a guide to her educational approach.

In 1957 the new library was named after Walton who had believed that a love of books was more important than academic achievement.

MLC became a school of the Uniting Church in Australia in the 1970s, as the Methodist, Presbyterian and Congregational Churches came together to form the Uniting Church.

== House system ==
As with most Australian schools, MLC utilises a house system through which girls participate in inter-house activities. When the house system first came into effect in June 1927, there were four houses: Athens, Rome, Sparta and Troy. In 1967, two more houses were added, Corinth and Olympia. Each house is named after a famous ancient city.

- Athens – green
- Corinth – purple
- Olympia – white
- Rome – red
- Sparta – yellow
- Troy – blue

Annual house events include:

- House Singing, Mime and Drama Day (HSMD), in which every girl from years 7 through to year 12 compete in at least one activity for their house. The points are recorded throughout the year and the winning house is awarded the Heather Lamont Cup.
- A choir performance conducted by two Year 12 students. Each house performs one song chosen by the conductresses. Part of HSMD.
- A mime performance for students in Years 7, 8 and 9, directed by two Year 11 students. Part of HSMD.
- A drama performance for Years 10, 11 and 12 students, directed by two students from Year 12. Part of HSMD.
- Interhouse Sports – Throughout the year the students participate in many sporting activities for their house, such as swimming in term 1, and athletics in term 2.

A new initiative in 2010 is The Spirit Cape. In all house events, houses will also compete for the Spirit Cape with it being awarded to the house that shows the most spirit over the course of the day. At the end of the year, one house will be awarded the Spirit Cape for the showing the most year-long house spirit. In 2010, Athens won the inaugural year-long Spirit Cape.

== Academics ==
ATAR for Year 12 students

Year – Rank – Median score

- 2019 – #6 – 89.95
- 2018 – #4 – 92.55
- 2017 – #19 – 87.5
- 2016 – #9 – 90.3

The school has performed well in the WACE exams and is often rated as one of the best schools in the state.

Year	% +75 in WACE (Note: Based on the number of Stage 3 course enrolments in the school where a WACE course score of 75 or above was achieved)	State ranking (Note: Ranking of school compared to other schools in the state)	% +65 in WACE (Note: Based on the number of Stage 3 course enrolments in the school where a WACE course score of 65 or above was achieved)	State ranking	% graduation (Note: Percentage of Year 12 cohort that graduated with a WACE certificate)
2015	32.44	5			
2014	24.60	12	49.47	15	98.84
2013	24.50	7	54.63	6	99.19
2012	31.09	2	63.23	4	97.95
2011	28.29	7	67.73	5	100
2010	30.07	6	72.76	3	100
2009		2		4	100

== Notable staff and alumnae ==
Some notable staff include:

- Flora Annie Landells, the painter and potter, was an art teacher here from 1908 to 1948.
- Dr. Penny Flett AO, first woman doctor to serve in the RAAF and the 2009 WA Australian of the Year, was the chair of MLC between 2012 and 2018.

Alumnae of MLC are known as Collegians. Some notable Collegians include:

Entertainment, media and the arts

- Jill Birt – Keyboard player for The Triffids
- Estelle Blackburn – Award-winning journalist
- Isla Fisher – Actress in television show Home and Away and film Wedding Crashers and Confessions of a Shopaholic. She married Sacha Baron Cohen on 15 March 2010, in Paris. Fisher and Baron Cohen have a daughter, Olive, born 19 October 2007, in Los Angeles.
- Trilby Glover – Actress in television show The Starter Wife
- Dorothy Hollingsworth – Creator and presenter (known as 'Miss Fleming') of ABC Radio series Let’s Join In from 1951–1989
- Georgi Kay – Musician
- Holly Ransom – Social entrepreneur and activist
- Rose Skinner – Art-dealer
- Freya Tingley – Actress
- Bridget Malcolm – Model

Medicine and science

- Freda Jacob – Founder of the Independent Living Centre of Western Australia
- Marjorie Jean Lyon – Surgeon and Prisoner of war

Politics, public service and the law

- Mia Davies – Leader of the National Party in Western Australia
- Chris McDiven – Federal President of the Liberal Party of Australia (also attended Penrhos College, Perth)
- Kezia Purick – Northern Territory politician, Speaker of the Legislative Assembly
- Lisa Scaffidi – Lord Mayor of Perth

Sport

- Nicole Bolton – international cricketer (Australia)
- Rachel Harris – Olympic swimmer, Sydney 2000; Commonwealth Games swimmer, Kuala Lumpur 1998 (Gold Medallist)
- Minjee Lee – Professional and Olympic golfer (also attended Corpus Christi College, Perth)
- Elise Rechichi – Olympic sailor, Beijing (Qingdao) 2008 (Gold Medallist)
- Allana Slater – Olympic gymnast, Sydney 2000; Commonwealth Games gymnast, Kuala Lumpur 1998 (Gold Medallist), Manchester 2002 (Gold Medallist)

== See also ==
- List of schools in the Perth metropolitan area
- List of boarding schools
