= Maud Cameron =

Australian headmistress (1886–1973)

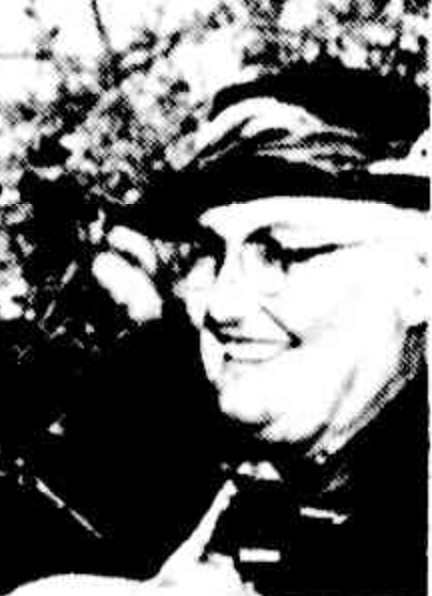
Maud Cameron in 1951, celebrating 40 years as head of Firbank

Maud Martha Cameron MBE (1886–1973) was a teacher and school headmistress of Firbank Church of England Girls' Grammar School, in Australia. She served as president of the Victorian Association of Headmistresses and acting president of the Headmistresses Association of Australia. In 1955, she was appointed a Member of the Order of the British Empire (Civil).

== Early life and education ==
Cameron was born in Melbourne in 1886. She was the first of four children of Ewen Cameron, a grazier who later became a member of the Victorian Legislative Assembly, and his wife Emma Harriet, née Nunn, both of whom had been born in Victoria.

Cameron was educated at Presbyterian Ladies' College and the University of Melbourne. She graduated with a Bachelor of Arts degree in 1908 and master's degree in education in 1911.

== Career ==
For 43 years, from 1911 to 1954, Cameron was headmistress of Firbank Church of England Girls' Grammar School, in Brighton, a suburb of Melbourne, Australia. During her tenure, the school grew from 43 students to over 900 leaving Firbank one of the largest girls' schools in Australia. The founder of the school, Henry Lowther Clarke, wrote "My greatest service to Firbank was the discovery of Miss Cameron... seldom have School and Headmistress been so identified with the other." Prior to her tenure at Firbank she was on the teaching staff of Lauriston Girls' School and Presbyterian Ladies' College.

From 1936 to 1937, Cameron was president of the Victorian Association of Headmistresses. In 1945, she was acting president of the Headmistresses Association of Australia.
