= Lisa Messenger =

Australian entrepreneur and author (born 1971)

- Born: 28 December 1971 (age 54)
- Occupations: Entrepreneur, author, CEO and founder of Collective Hub
- Website: https://collectivehub.com/

Lisa Messenger (born 1971) is an Australian entrepreneur and author. She is the owner and creative director of marketing for The Messenger Group, a book publishing company, and the founder and Editor in Chief of Collective Hub, a magazine.

== Career ==
Messenger founded The Messenger Group in 2001 in Sydney, brokering sponsorship deals and doing public relations and marketing. Collective was launched in 2013 with $1.5 million of her own money, as an "entrepreneurial and lifestyle" print magazine, alongside a website and events company. In 2015, Collective was distributed in 37 countries.

In October 2017, the Group announced that this flagship publication would shift from monthly to bi-monthly after "several redundancies as the business streamlines itself around the three key pillars of print, digital and events."

On 26 March 2018, Messenger announced that the print edition would close. Messenger also closed the Sydney office. Financial and creative reasons were given, and she wrote a book about the process. Several months later, the print edition was reinstated, although with one-off issues and freelance contracts for a smaller number of journalists.

== Books ==
Messenger has written several lifestyle and business books. Most are published by her own company, although Daring & Disruptive was also published by Simon & Schuster. Her self-help and entrepreneurship books discuss personal challenges as well as business. She was married and divorced, and as detailed in her 2016 books, was engaged to an entrepreneur in 2015. In 2023, her friend acted as a surrogate mother of her son.
