= Trevelyan College, Durham =

Constituent college of Durham University

Trevelyan College
- Durham University
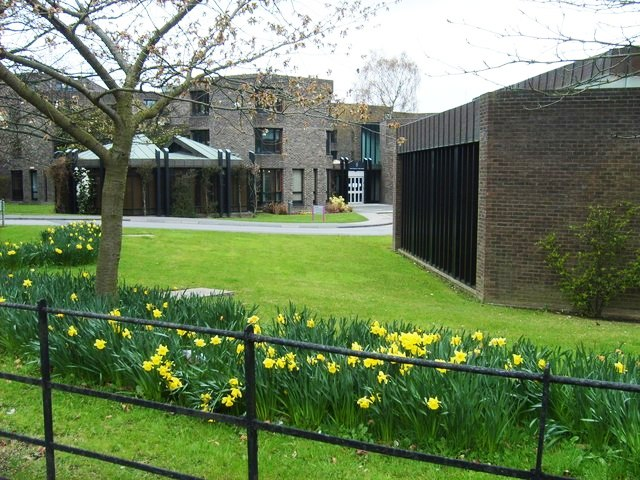
- Main College

- Arms of Trevelyan College; Arms: Gules, issuant from water in base harry wavy of four argent and azure a demi horse rampant Or, in chief three crosses of St. Cuthbert argent.
- Coordinates: 54.764167°N 1.579444°W
- Motto: Latin: Vera fictis libentius
- Motto in English: Truth more readily than falsehood
- Established: 1966
- Named for: George Macaulay Trevelyan
- Principal: Adekunle Adeyeye
- Vice principal: Martin Brader
- Undergraduates: 900
- Postgraduates: 150
- Website: Trevelyan College; Trevelyan College JCR; Trevelyan College MCR; Trevelyan College SCR; Trevelyan College Boat Club

Map
- Location within Durham, England

Trevelyan College (known colloquially as Trevs) is a college of Durham University, England. Founded in 1966, the college takes its name from social historian George Macaulay Trevelyan (pronounced "Trevillian"), chancellor of the university from 1950 to 1957. Originally an all-female college (the last to open in England), the college became fully mixed in 1992.

Trevelyan is noted in Durham for its hexagon-featuring architecture and for the display of daffodils that surrounds it every spring. As a constituent college of Durham University, Trevelyan is listed as a higher education institution under the Education Reform Act 1988. It is owned and for the most part run by the university.

== History ==
During the early 1960s, the British Government commissioned the Robbins Report to look into the future of higher education in the UK. When published, the report recommended the expansion of universities and the student population. This was accepted as government policy. In 1963, the University of Newcastle was officially established as a separate entity from the University of Durham, which meant that new colleges within Durham were required in order to meet the number of new university places that the Government wished to create. As a result, the university planned for three new colleges on Elvet Hill; these went on to become Collingwood, Trevelyan and Van Mildert.

=== New women's college ===
Trevelyan was planned to become an all-women college, similar to St Mary's and St Aidan's, so as to increase the female population of the student body. The college was built on farmland south of St Mary's off Elvet Hill Road, which was owned by a local family, the Carpenters. Originally this land was intended to accommodate not only the new college, but also a University Assembly Hall with a capacity of 1,500 people; however, the site was too small to accommodate both.

After much delay, the college was opened in October 1966 with 78 students. The official opening took place on 12 March 1968 by Lord Butler, Master of Trinity College, Cambridge, who was invited in view of the connection G. M. Trevelyan also held with Trinity. During the opening, a serenade in three movements composed by Sir Malcolm Arnold (whose daughter was in the first intake of students), called "The Trevelyan Suite", was played. Other people at the opening include the Chancellor, the Vice-Chancellor, two Pro-Vice-Chancellors, the Bishops of Durham and of Ripon (whose wife, Mary Moorman, was a relative of Trevelyan and also present) and the Mayor and Mayoress of Durham. Trevelyan was the last purpose-built all-female college to be built for a British university.

=== Since opening ===
In 1973, a 300-person capacity hall, the Sir James Knott Hall, (known colloquially as the "JKH") was opened in the presence of the Duke of Northumberland. The purpose of the hall was to provide more facilities for Trevelyan students, such as a badminton court and extra music rooms, as well as to create a conference facility for the purpose of wealth creation for the college. In 1988 an extension to the hall, the Dowrick Suite, was added, named after a professor of the law department, Frank Dowrick, who was a longtime member of the Senior Common Room. Inside the main college building is the Mowlam Room, a postgraduate common room which previously housed a bust of Mo Mowlam, a well-known Trevs alumna. This bust is currently located in the entrance hall of the college.

In 1981, the bar, which had previously been located within the small area now hosting the buttery was moved to its present location in the former cloisters of the college. In order to make this a practical bar environment the cloisters were roofed over. The area above this new roof is nicknamed "The Fish Bowl" by students, due to the proximity of the windows looking into other rooms.

In 1987, the Governing Body of the college voted to follow Hatfield and Castle in becoming mixed-sex, despite 68% of college members voting against such a change. In 1991 a new accommodation block was added to the main building. This block, the K block, is entirely ensuite and now typically reserved for postgraduate students.

The college became fully mixed in 1992. In 1993, and again in 2010, the bar underwent refurbishment. In 2000, a tennis court was added to the grounds at the back of the college. In 2021 Adekunle Adeyeye (College Principal) was reported to have created a culture of bullying, sexism and intimidation of staff, which has reportedly resulted in several potential alumni withholding donations over his appointment, as well as the JCR voting to condemn him.

== Buildings ==
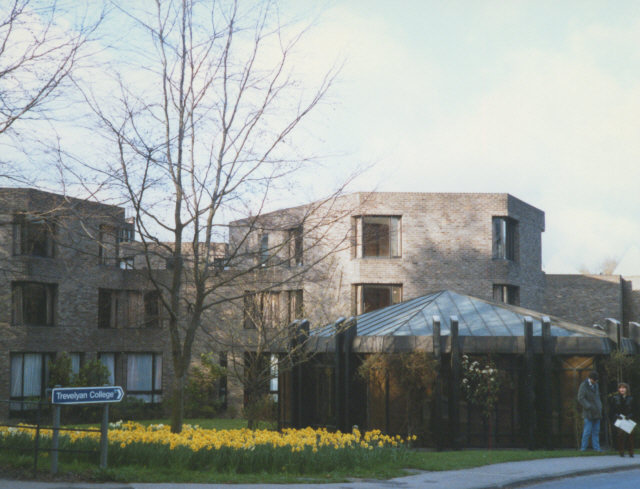
Front view

The internal construction of Trevelyan is unusual, comprising a string of hexagon-shaped blocks, resulting in most rooms containing unusual angles.

At the opening of the college, its architect John Eastwick-Field said of the design of the college:

"the building had been irregularly planned in outline but close together in complex. The aim had been to create study bedrooms with individuality, a sense of light and space and overall the effort to foster community sense by grouping the rooms into small units of hexagonal shape onto individual landings."

— John Eastwick-Field, Architect of the college

The original blocks are labelled "A" to "J", though there is no I Block to be found and there is also a modern block of ensuite bedrooms, K Block, also called the Macaulay Suite, named after Lord Macaulay, G. M. Trevelyan's great-uncle.

The layout features rooms based around staircases, landings and courtyards. The entrance hall is referred to as "the Cobbles", although said cobbles are no longer there, having been removed during a recent modern refit. A third of the college was fully refurbished in 2005.

Approximately 320 fully catered students can be housed in the building, and around 790 are members of the college, making Trevelyan the third-smallest of Durham's seventeen colleges, and the smallest of those maintained by the university council.

The building's design has won it a Civic Design Award.

=== Facilities ===
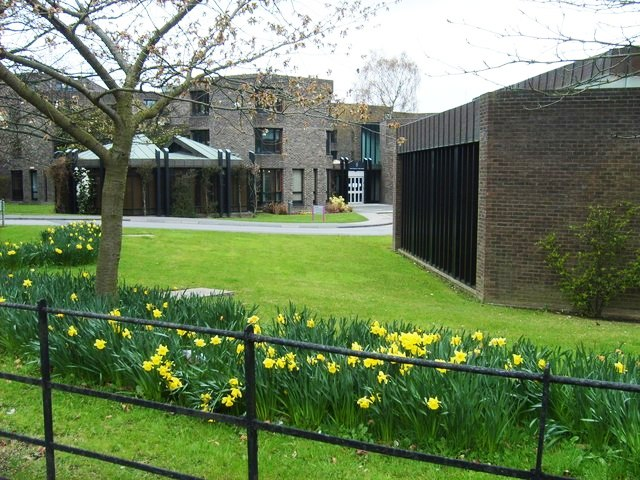
Trevelyan College entrance

Trevs has its own comprehensive library, which is open 24 hours a day; music practice room; recording studio; cinema room; computer room; bar; buttery; and fitness suite; it also possesses a chapel, the Barn, which is used for prayer, talks and musical and dramatic rehearsals.

The Undercroft, a relaxing seating area, links the bar with the rear of the college. The college also has a central quad, although it is actually an irregular icosagon, a setting for the college's musical events and formal ball. To the rear of the college there are landscaped lawns and a tennis court.

The Sir James Knott Hall, catering for sports, theatrical and conference events is situated just across the college main entrance.

== Student life ==
=== Common rooms ===
All members of college are members of a common room. Undergraduates are members of the Junior Common Room (JCR). They may opt out of the common room if they wish, although if they do so they are not allowed to attend JCR events, such as the informal and formal ball, or Formal Hall. The JCR annually elects an executive committee consisting of ten members as well as an impartial chair. The executive committee ensures the successful running of the JCR, in conjunction with the College Officers. The rules of the JCR are stated in the standing orders, which can only be amended by resolution of the JCR members during general meetings.

Postgraduate and some senior undergraduate students, including mature students, are members of the Middle Common Room (MCR), which hosts its own events and operates similarly to the JCR. The MCR has its own standing orders and executive committee consisting of eleven elected members.

Administrative, academic and other members of college are members of the Senior Common Room (SCR).

=== Arts ===
The college has a strong history of music, art, and the performing arts. The college has hosted, and continues to host, art viewings both of local and international artists, as well as boasting a large art collection of its own. This collection includes six specially commissioned John Walker paintings which hang in the dining hall. The college has an orchestral society, a chamber choir, a flute choir, a popular music choir, an a cappella group, chamber singers and a jazz band; The Manglers, who are regular performers at jazz evenings across the university. The college also has a theatre company, Sixth Side Theatre, which puts on productions several times a year alongside the premier Trevelyan College Musical Society.

The college hosts at least one musical per year from Trevelyan College Musical Society, which has been active since 1994. The list of the musicals that they have put on is as follows:

Year	Show
2026	Everybody's Talking About Jamie
2025	[title of show] Jesus Christ Superstar
2024	Shrek: The Musical
2023	Gypsy
2022	*Tick, Tick Boom Legally Blonde
2021	*Footloose
2020	The Addams Family
2019	Working: A Musical How to Succeed in Business Without Really Trying
2018	Our House Guys and Dolls
2017	American Idiot Sweet Charity
2016	Sunshine on Leith Oklahoma!
2015	My Favourite Show of the Year Shout
2014	Thoroughly Modern Millie
2013	Annie Get Your Gun
2012	Anything Goes
2011	How to Succeed in Business Without Really Trying
2010	Sweet Charity
2009	Flying High Funny Girl
2008	-
2007	The Pyjama Game
2006	Guys and Dolls
2005	Crazy for You
2004	Bugsy Malone
2003	My Fair Lady
2002	High Society
2001	Good News
2000	Bells are Ringing
1999	Anything Goes
1998	Return to the Forbidden Planet
1997	Calamity Jane
1996	The Boy Friend
1995	Carousel
1994	Guys and Dolls

=== Sport ===
Trevelyan College Boat Club Blade.

The college also has a strong sporting profile, finishing 5th in the college league table in 2008/9. The college has also in recent years been college champions of women's hockey, Women's astro football, Basketball (both men's and women's) and Badminton, which saw Men's A finish the session undefeated. The college cheer team has also found success; winning both All Girl Groups Stunt and Co-Ed Level 2, at the 2019 Intercollegiate Comp. They were also crowned Grand Champions in the same year. Trevelyan College Boat Club is one of the few college rowing teams to qualify for Henley Royal Regatta. The college rugby club made headlines in 2017 after planning to hold a 'Miners versus Thatcher' social. As a result of the controversy the club was suspended for the remainder of the season.

=== Other ===
Student societies play an important role in college life, with active Board Games, and LGBT societies. Previously, the college ran a monthly magazine called Hex magazine, named in tribute to the college's interesting hexagonal shape. The magazine stopped running in 2013 and was relaunched in 2024 in a mostly online format, that publishes a print edition approximately twice a year.

=== Traditions ===
The college holds Formal Hall once a fortnight, in which students enter the dining hall in their academic gowns, which must remain worn until the end of silent grace. The formal is signalled over when the JCR and MCR presidents bow out formally to the Principal and student body. Traditionally, "spoon banging" (in which student attendees loudly bang their spoons on the table) occurs immediately following the departure of high table. JCR events are held every year, with a Christmas Ball being held at the end of Michaelmas term (previously this was known as Informal Ball), and a summer ball being held after exams in Easter term.

Academic gowns are also worn at university matriculation, at college matriculation and at graduation.

Boat Club 1st 4+ at Henley 2008

The annual Trevs Day takes place after exams in Easter term, and is a focus of much celebration and revelry for students. Each year it receives a different theme, with recent themes including 'Heroes and Villains' (2014), 'Charlie and the Chocolate Factory' (2015), 'Rio 2016' (2016), 'Tropical Beach Party' (2017) and 'Wild West' (2018). The college also hosts TrevStock, an annual music festival for college and university bands which takes place in the quad.

The college regulations once stated that "any student found picking the daffodils shall be hanged, drawn and quartered at dawn on Palace Green."

=== Coat of arms ===
The college arms are modelled closely on the arms of the Trevelyan family, whose crest features a swimming horse, commemorating the legend of the first Trevelyan, who swum his horse from St Michael's Mount to the mainland of Cornwall for a wager, the other knights of Arthur's court having drowned.

The arms of Trevelyan College are blazoned as follows:

Shield: Gules issuant from water in base barry wavy of four Argent and Azure a demi horse forcene Or, in chief three Saint Cuthbert's crosses Argent

Crest: Out of a coronet composed of sixteen fleurs-de-lis set upon a rim alternately large and small a lyre Or, mantled Gules doubled Argent

=== Motto ===
The college motto, Vera Fictis Libentius, was taken from the inscription of the 1875 statue of Lord Macaulay in the antechamber of the chapel of Trinity College, Cambridge. In the early 1980s, a competition was held to name the horse. Its eventual name, Vera, stems from a student innocently assuming that the college motto, Vera Fictis Libentius, was referring to the horse. Since Adekunle Adeyeye took over as principal, he has attempted to replace the motto with the phrase "Explore Without Limits".

== Connections with the Trevelyan family ==
Trevelyan College still maintains a number of connections with the greater Trevelyan family, some of these include:

- Mary Moorman, daughter of G. M. Trevelyan, was a member of the Senior Common Room and was awarded an honorary doctor of letters from Durham
- Humphrey Trevelyan, Baron Trevelyan, a member of the Trevelyan Governing Body from 1970 until 1977. Lord Trevelyan arranged the grant from the Sir James Knott Trust that provided funding for the Sir James Knott Hall.
- The artists Julian Trevelyan and Mary Fedden, some of whose work is owned by the college. Mrs Fedden provided significant donations for prizes for original works of art by college members.
- Jon and Karen Trevelyan, who are both former college tutors.

== College officers and fellows ==
=== List of principals ===
- Joan Bernard 1965–1979
- Deborah Lavin 1979–1995
- George Marshall 1995–1996
- Malcolm Todd 1996–2000
- Nigel Martin 2000–2008
- H. Martyn Evans 2008–2019
- Adekunle Adeyeye 2019–present

=== List of vice principals ===
- Martin Brader 2021–present

=== List of assistant principals ===
- Dr Hannah Martin 2021–2025
- Kelci Jacoby 2025–present

=== List of JCR Presidents ===
- Bex Smith
- Harry Naylor
- James Koo
- George Little
- Dorian Held
- Alannah Life
- Alistair Stark (first Sabbatical President)
- Giorgio Rand
- Mary Karvalits
- Lydia Edwards
- Sam Leather
- Alex Tansey
- Hannah Pilkington
- Adam Thompson
- Nick Cooper
- Mark Buttanshaw
- Oliver Bartlett
- Claire Markwell
- Darren Starling
- Madeleine McGivern
- Morven LacLeod

== Fellowships ==
The college has a tradition of visiting fellows, who typically stay for a term, giving a Trevelyan Lecture based upon their research areas. The college also hosts the Sir William Luce Fellowship, in a joint project with the Institute of Islamic and Middle-Eastern Studies. Past fellows have included academics from the UK-based Universities of Reading and Exeter, as well as the international Universities of Brown, Harvard, Khartoum, Tehran and Sultan Qaboos University in Oman

== Honorary fellows ==
Honorary fellowships were awarded between 1996–98 to those people who have greatly aided or have a close association with the college. Normally such people are made members of the SCR. In more recent years, this tradition has been replaced by the Senior Common Room granting Honorary Life Membership to visiting lecturers, including Sir John Curtice, and Michael Cox (academic).

- Mary Fedden
- Sir John James
- Deborah Lavin
- Sir Jack Zunz
- Sir Donald Hawley MBE
- Mo Mowlam

== Trevelyan Society and Trust ==
The Trevelyan Society is the alumni organisation of the college, whose aims are to inform alumni of goings on in college as well as to keep alumni in touch with each other. It produces an annual magazine: "Hippocampus", a play on the arms of the college. The Trevelyan Trust is a charitable fund aimed at providing prizes and bursaries for Trevelyan students.

=== Scholarships and prizes ===
Trevelyan has several scholarships and prizes that are awards to members of the college, some founded by the Trevelyan Trust, others from private donors. A partial list of scholarships and bursaries is included below:

- The Helena Margaret Biss Scholarship
- The Greenwood Merit Scholarship
- The Deborah Lavin Scholarship
- The Ove Arup Scholarship for the Built Environment
- The Bruhl Scholarship for Modern Languages
- The G. M. Trevelyan Scholarship
- The Marion Zunz Travel Bursary

In addition to this the Boat Club also award the Dyfrig Williams Trophy to a member of college who has significantly contributed to college sport.

== Notable alumni ==
- Lucy Beresford (writer, psychotherapist and media commentator)
- Lady Black of Derwent, former Justice of the Supreme Court of the United Kingdom
- Joy Carter (Vice-Chancellor, University of Winchester)
- Pippa Greenwood (garden expert)
- Dianne Hayter, Baroness Hayter of Kentish Town (former General secretary of the Fabian Society and current chair of Labour Party National Executive Committee)
- Sophie Hosking (Olympic gold medal-winning rower)
- Mo Mowlam (former cabinet minister)
- Rachel Squire (former Labour MP)
- Minette Walters (thriller writer)

== Bibliography ==
- Martin, Susan. (2006) Trevs: A Celebration of 40 Years. Durham: The Trevelyan Trust, Trevelyan College.
