= Debbie Whitmont =

Australian television journalist

Debbie Whitmont is an Australian television journalist.

In 1989, Whitmont began her work at ABC as a researcher. She then spent three years in commercial television, working for Channel 10. Whitmont returned to Four Corners as a reporter, producer, and later associate producer. From 1993 to 1996, she served as a Middle East correspondent for ABC, filing reports from Iran, Iraq, Syria, Lebanon, Egypt, and Pakistan for Lateline, Foreign Correspondent, and The 7.30 Report. In 1998, she returned to report for Four Corners.

== Sources ==
- The Women's Pages: Australian Women and Journalism since 1850, Australian Women's Archives Project, 2008
