= Kitty Mackay =

Australian swimmer

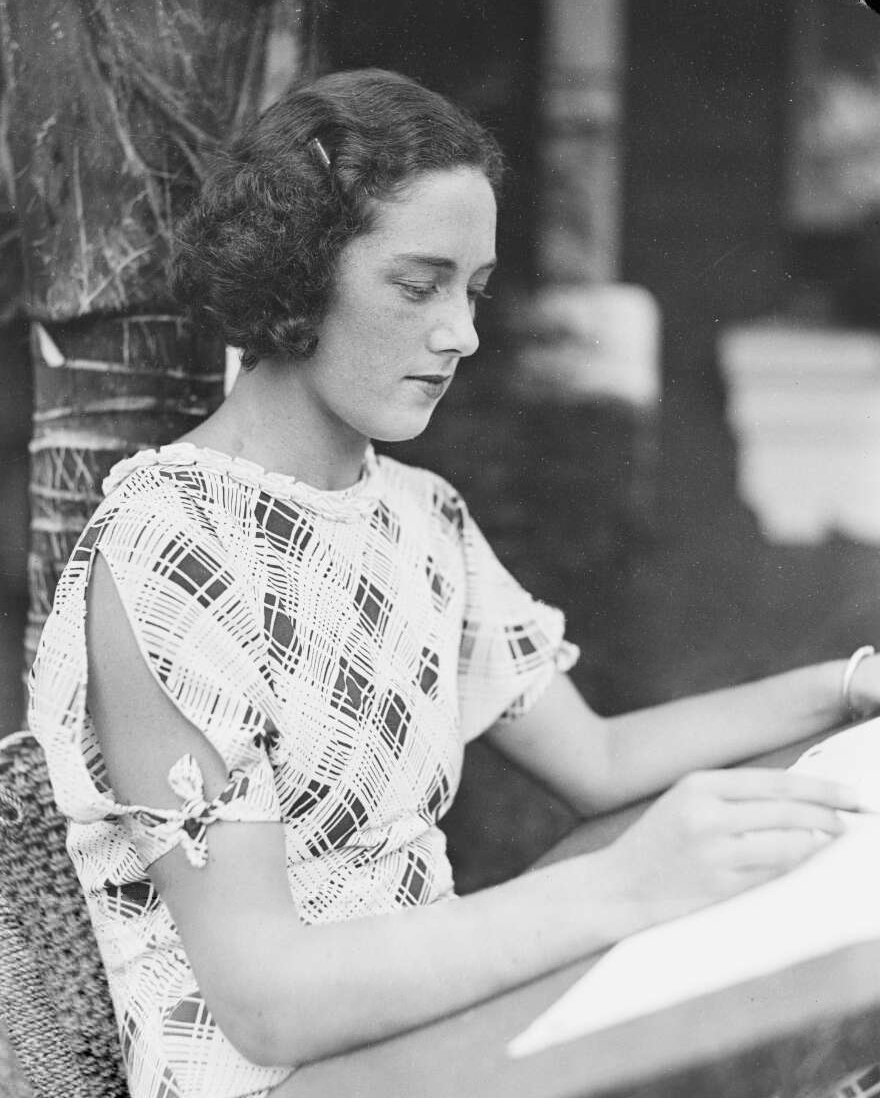
- Mackay in 1934

Personal information
- Born: 5 June 1915 Melbourne, Australia
- Died: 25 June 1974 (aged 59) Sydney, Australia
- Height: 182 cm (6 ft 0 in)

Sport
- Sport: Swimming
- Strokes: Freestyle, backstroke
- Club: Bondi Ladies ASC

Ethel Ellen "Kitty" Mackay (later Hodgson, 5 June 1915 – 25 June 1974) was an Australian swimmer. She competed in the 100 m freestyle and 100 m backstroke events at the 1936 Summer Olympics, but failed to reach the finals.
