= Ugchelen =

- Village and neighbourhood
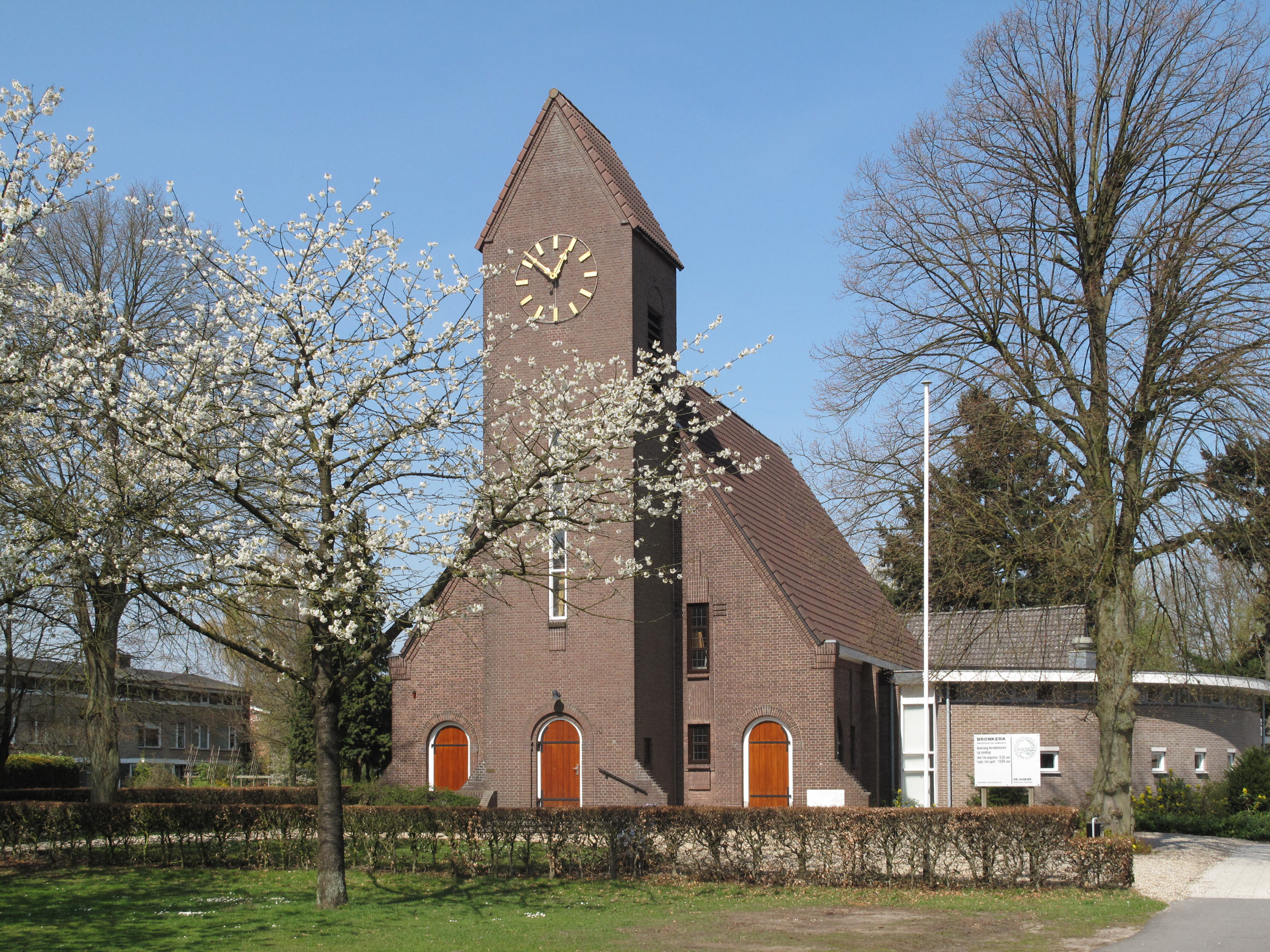
- Church at Ugchelen

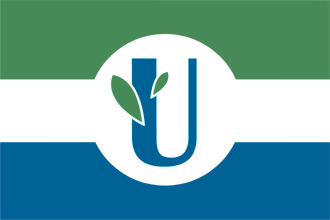
- Flag

- Location in the province of Gelderland Ugchelen (Netherlands)
- Coordinates: 52°11′7″N 5°56′27″E
- Country: Netherlands
- Province: Gelderland
- Municipality: Apeldoorn

Area
  - Total: 23.32 km^{2} (9.00 sq mi)
- Elevation: 26 m (85 ft)

Population (2021)
  - Total: 3,860
  - Density: 166/km^{2} (429/sq mi)
- Time zone: UTC+1 (CET)
  - Summer (DST): UTC+2 (CEST)
- Postal code: 7339
- Dialing code: 055

Ugchelen is part of the municipality of Apeldoorn in the Gelderland province of the Netherlands, and is today seen as a village.

Ugchelen is located South West of Apeldoorn and has about 7000 inhabitants. Like Apeldoorn, the old village thanked its growth to the paper industry, it had a total of 11 watermills. In 1958 a 70-meter high transmission tower was built, the Zendstation Ugchelen. In 2006 it received a new water mill called The Bouwhof Mill.

The most important hospital in the region, Gelre hospital, is located next to Ugchelen.

== Notable people ==
- Robin Linschoten, politician (VVD) (born 17 October 1956 in Ugchelen)
- Peter Bosz, manager with Olympique Lyonnais and ex-trainer of AGOVV Apeldoorn and ex-professional soccer player with Feyenoord (born 21 November 1963 in Apeldoorn)
- Medy van der Laan, politician (D66) (born 14 August 1968 in Spijkenisse)
- Jan Kromkamp, professional soccer player with PSV (born 17 August 1980 in Makkinga)
- Jaime Bruinier, professional soccer player with AGOVV (born 28 June 1987 in Ugchelen)

== Gallery ==
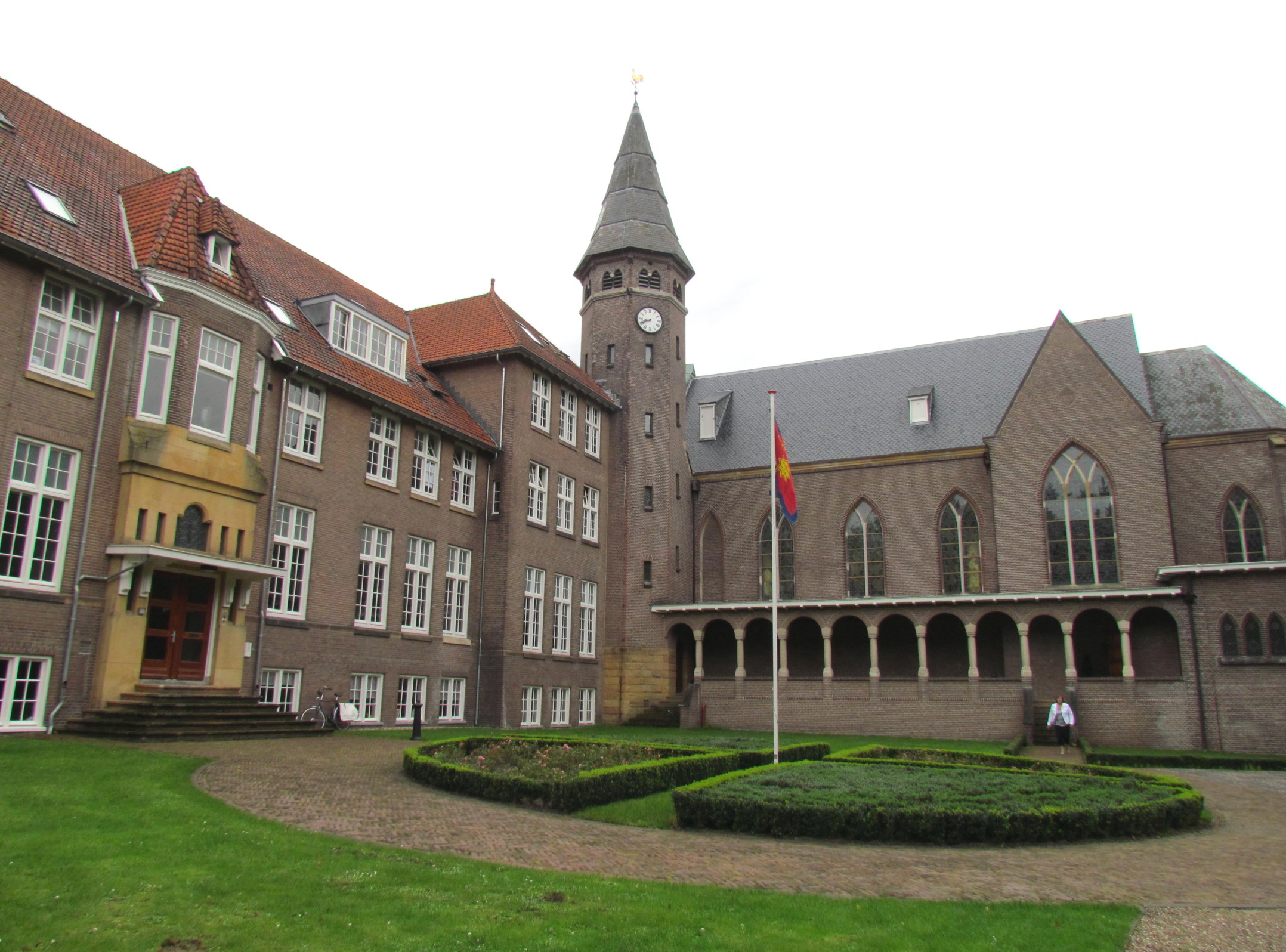
Caesarea chapel

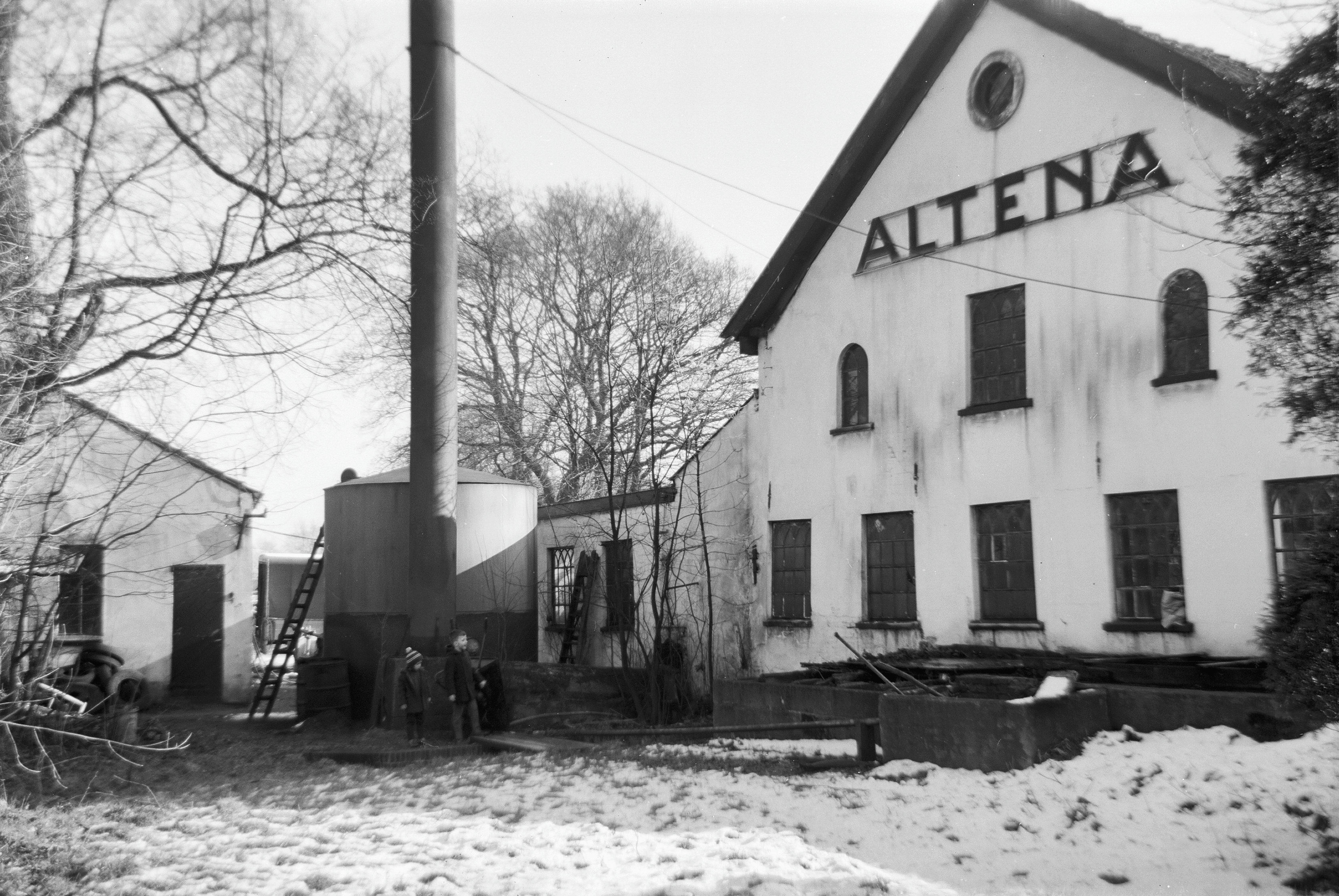
Altena factory

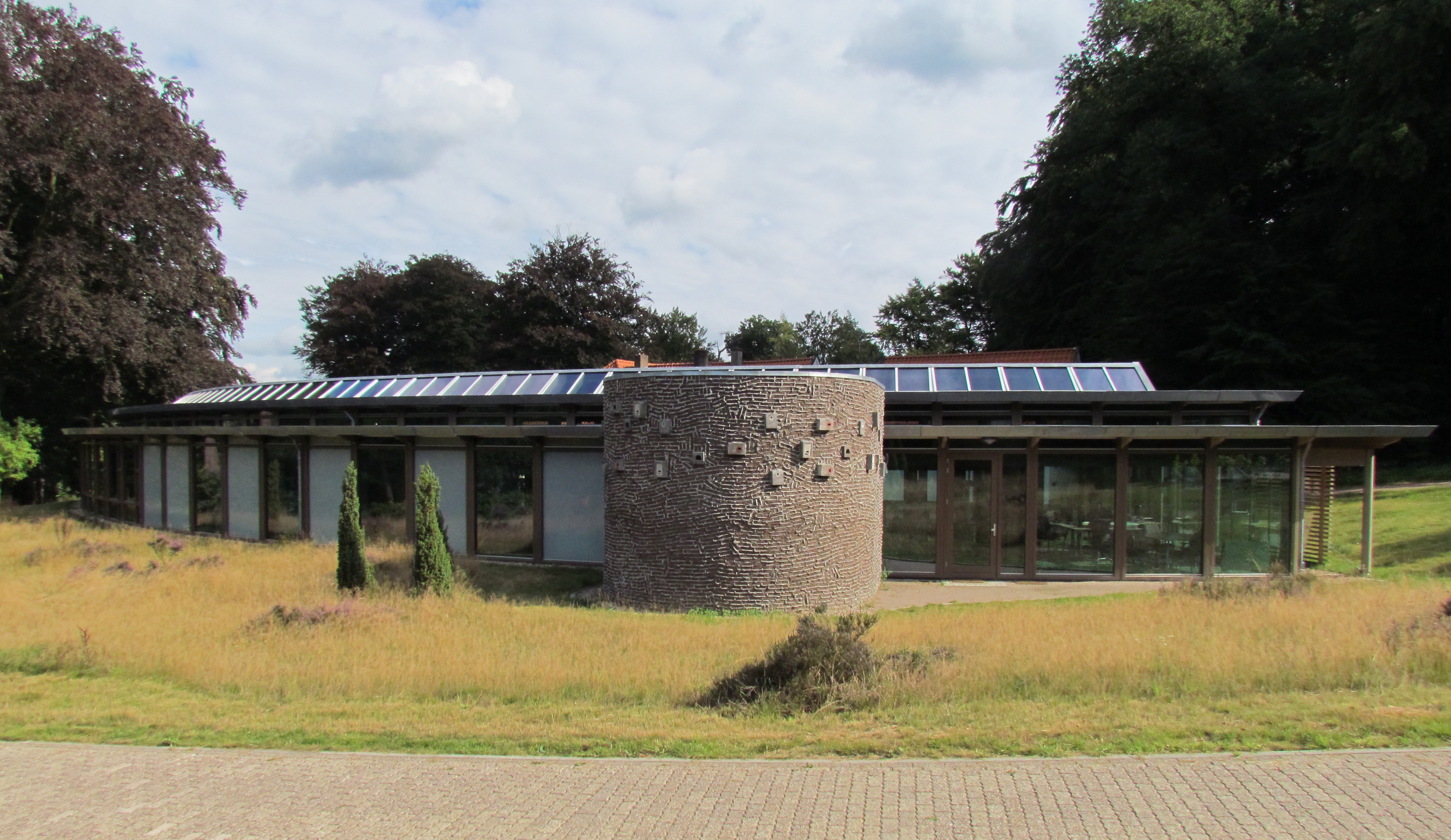
Forest office

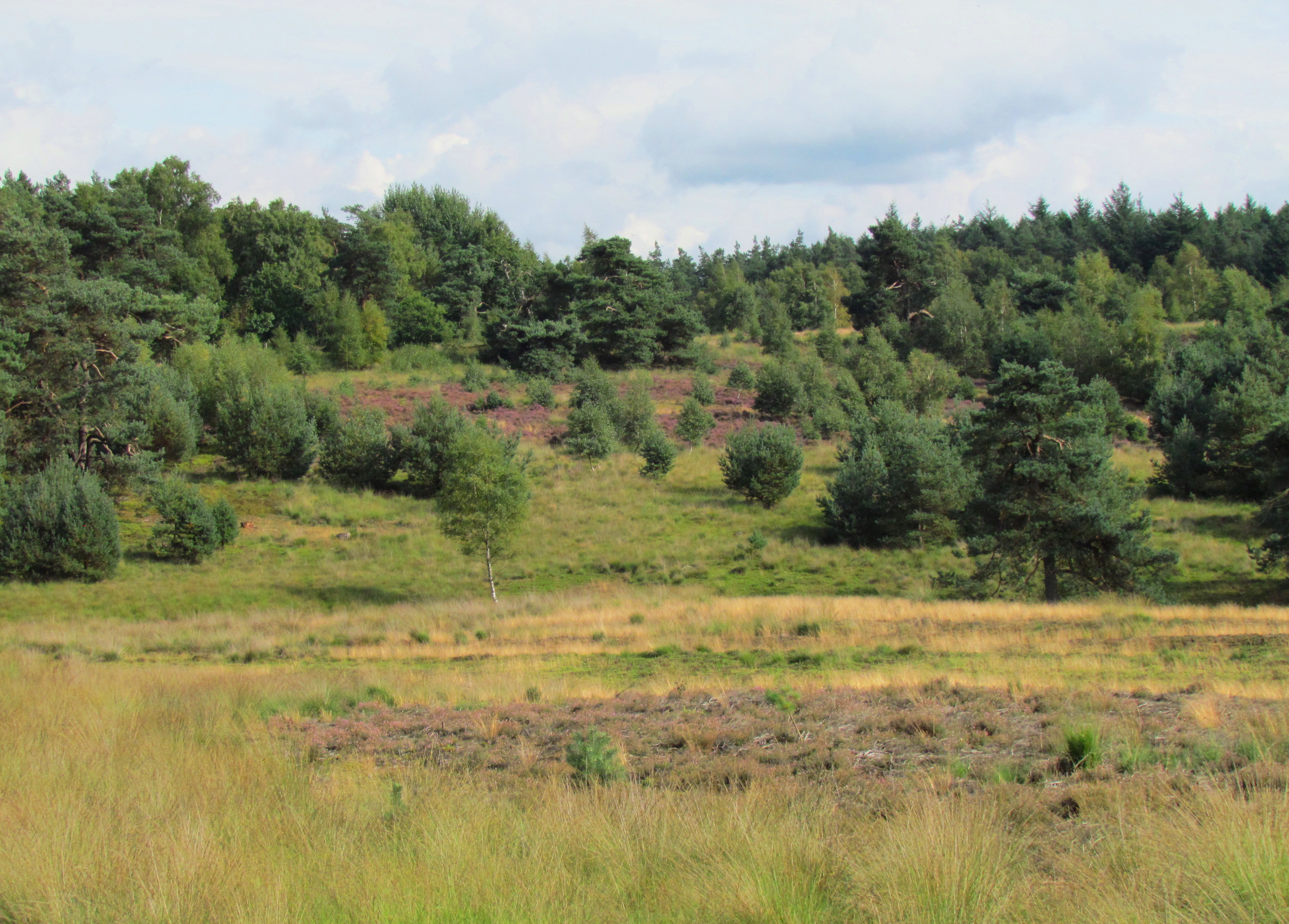
Leesterheide
