= Dalton Plan =

Educational concept

The Dalton Plan is an educational concept created by Helen Parkhurst. It is inspired by the intellectual ferment at the turn of the 20th century. Educational thinkers such as Maria Montessori and John Dewey influenced Parkhurst while she created the Dalton Plan. Their aim was to achieve a balance between a child's talent and the needs of the community.

== Characteristics ==
Parkhurst's specific objectives were as follows:

1. To tailor each student's program to his or her needs, interests and abilities.
2. To promote each student's independence and dependability.
3. To enhance the student's social skills.
4. To increase their sense of responsibility toward others.

Influenced at least in part by the teachings of Judo after conversations with the founder of Kodokan Judo, Dr Jigoro Kano. Ref page 72 and 86 ISBN 978-1-56836-479-1

She developed a three-part plan that continues to be the structural foundation of a Dalton education:

1. The House, a social community of students.
2. The Assignment, a monthly goal which students contract to complete.
3. The Laboratory, a subject-based classroom intended to be the center of the educational experience. The laboratory involves students from fourth grade through the end of secondary education.

Students move between subject "laboratories" (classrooms) and explore themes at their own pace.

== Introduction in UK ==
In 1920, an article describing the working of the Dalton Plan in detail was published in the Times' Educational Supplement. Parkhurst "has given to the secondary school the leisure and culture of the University student; she has uncongested the curriculum; she has abolished the teacher's nightly preparation of classes and the child's nightmare of homework. At the same time the children under her regime cover automatically all the ground prescribed for examinations 'of matriculation standard,' and examination failures among them are nil."

The Dalton Plan is a method of education by which pupils work at their own pace, and receive individual help from the teacher when necessary. There is no formal class instruction. Students draw up time-tables and are responsible for finishing the work on their syllabuses or assignments. Students are also encouraged to help each other with their work. The underlying aim of the Dalton Plan is to achieve the highest mental, moral, physical and spiritual development of the pupil.

In the spring of 1921, English headmistress Rosa Bassett went to the Children's University School and stayed with Parkhurst. They spent hours talking about education. Parkhurst found Bassett in complete agreement with her ideas: "She was Dalton," Parkhurst wrote 50 years later. She described Bassett and Belle Rennie as the two people in England who were most enthusiastic and most helpful about the introduction of the Dalton Plan. Rosa Bassett was instrumental in the first application of the Dalton Plan of teaching within an English secondary school. She contributed a chapter to Parkhurst's book on the Plan,

== Schools ==
=== List of schools ===
==== Australia ====
- Ascham School, Sydney, 1922
- Methodist Ladies' College, Perth, 1921 (ceased in 1945)

==== Austria ====
- Europaschule, Wien
- HTBL Lastenstraße, Klagenfurt
- Internationale Daltonschule mit IT-Schwerpunkt Wels
- de La Tour Schule Deutschlandsberg

==== Belgium ====
- Basisschool De Kleine Icarus, Gent
- Basisschool De Lotus, Gent
- Basisschool Dalton 1 Hasselt
- Basisschool Dalton 2 Hasselt
- GO!Dalton Gent,Gent, http://www.dalton.gent

==== China ====
- Shanghai East Century School, Shanghai
- Little Dalton Kindergarten, Hong Kong
- Dalton School Hong Kong, Hong Kong
- Wenzhou Dalton Elementary School, Wenzhou

==== Czech Republic ====
- ZŠ a MŠ Chalabalova, Brno
- ZŠ a MŠ Husova, Brno
- ZŠ a MŠ Křídlovick, Brno
- ZŠ a MŠ Mutĕnická, Brno
- ZŠ Rájec-Jestřebí
- Gymnázium Slovanské námĕstí, Brno
- ZŠ Benešova Třebíč
- Základní škola, Brno
- Základní škola Brno, Brno

==== Germany ====
- Angell Akademie, Freiburg
- Gymnasium Alsdorf, Alsdorf
- Grundschule Unstruttal, Ammern, near Mühlhausen
- Marie-Kahle-Gesamtschule Bonn, Bonn
- Albrecht-Dürer-Gymnasium Berlin, Berlin
- Theodor-Heuss-Gymnasium, Dinslaken
- Schillerschule, Erfurt
- Gymnasium Essen-Überruhr, Essen
- Internationale Gesamtschule Heidelberg, Heidelberg
- Gymnasium Lage, Lage
- Gymnasium Vegesack, Bremen
- Gymnasium Bondenwald, Hamburg

==== India ====
Global School, Rahuri. MH

==== Japan ====
In Japan, Admiral Osami Nagano introduced a progressive educational method such as the Dalton plan to the Japanese Naval Academy School and influenced it.

- Dalton Tokyo, Tokyo
- Dalton Nagoya, Nagoya

==== Korea ====
- Cheongna Dalton School, Cheongna

==== Netherlands ====
- Basisschool de Bakelgeert, Boxmeer
- Brederode Daltonschool, Santpoort Zuid
- Casimirschool, Gouda
- Dalton basisschool de Twijn, Utrecht
- Dalton basisschool Rijnsweerd, Utrecht
- Dalton Den Haag, The Hague (Den Haag)
- Dalton mavo, Naaldwijk
- Het Tangram, Rotterdam
- Daltonexpertisecentrum, Instituut Theo Thijssen, Hogeschool, Utrecht
- Daltonschool De Klipper, Berkel en Rodenrijs
- Daltonschool Hengelo Zuid, Hengelo
- Dalton Lyceum Barendrecht, Barendrecht
- De Achtbaan, Amersfoort
- De Klinker, Schiedam
- De Poolster, Amsterdam
- De Zevenster, Enschede
- 2de Daltonschool, Amsterdam
- 3de Daltonschool, Amsterdam
- Erasmus College, Zoetermeer
- Het Cheider, Amsterdam
- Helen Parkhurst College, Almere
- Hogeland College, Dalton vmbo, Warffum
- Kardinaal Alfrinkschool (voor Daltononderwijs), Wageningen
- Katholieke Daltonschool De Leeuwerik, Leiderdorp
- Koningin Wilhelmina School Overveen
- Markenhage, Breda
- Maurick College. Vught
- Saxion Hogeschool, Deventer
- Schooladviescentrum, Utrecht
- Stedelijk Daltoncollege, Zutphen
- Stedelijk Dalton College, Alkmaar
- Stedelijk Dalton Lyceum, Dordrecht
- Spinoza Lyceum, Amsterdam
- Spinoza 20first, Amsterdam
- obs Theo Thijssen, Assen
- obs Kloosterveen, Assen
- Tweemaster-Kameleon, Oost-Souburg
- De Vijfster, Capelle aan den IJssel
- Wenke Dalton Consultancy, Meppel
- Dalton College, Voorburg
- De Waterval, Ermelo
- Jeanne d'Arc, 't Harde
- De Juliana Daltonschool, Bussum
- Wolfert Dalton, Rotterdam
- Daltonschool De Margriet, Rotterdam
- Wolfert Lyceum, Bergschenhoek
- Daltonschool Klaverweide, Noordwijk
- Daltonschool Maarssen, Maarssen
- obs Het Klokhuis, Duiven
- Ronerborg, Roden
- KBS Eloy, Ugchelen
- Chr. Daltonschool Koningin Emma, Zwolle
- Haarlemmermeer lyceum Zuidrand, Hoofddorp
- De Tweemaster, Hoorn
- Basisschool De Ley, Leiden
- De Westerkim, Zaandam

==== Poland ====
- Academy International, Warsaw

==== Russia ====
- Dalton School 1080, Moscow

==== United Kingdom ====
- Bedales School, Hampshire
- Bryanston School, Blandford, Dorset
- Millington Primary School, Portadown
- St Trinnean's School, Edinburgh (which inspired the fictional St Trinian's)
- York Way Girls' School in King's Cross

==== United States ====
- Dalton School, New York City

== See also ==
- Dalton International
- J. G. Jeffreys, who introduced the Plan at Bryanston School, in England.
