= David Lean filmography =

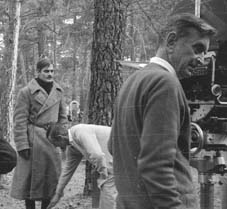
David Lean and Omar Sharif during the photography of Doctor Zhivago in 1965

The following is a filmography of David Lean, whose body of work in the film industry spanned the period from 1930 to 1984. This list includes the release year of the film, the role(s) Lean had in the production of each film, and additional notes such as awards and nominations. Lean directed 17 feature films in total. Lean often directed the large-scale epics The Bridge on the River Kwai (1957), Lawrence of Arabia (1962), Doctor Zhivago (1965), and A Passage to India (1984). He also directed two adaptations of Charles Dickens novels, Great Expectations (1946) and Oliver Twist (1948), as well as the romantic drama Brief Encounter (1945).

Originally a film editor in the early 1930s, Lean made his directorial debut with 1942's In Which We Serve, which was the first of four collaborations with Noël Coward. Beginning with Summertime in 1955, Lean began to make internationally co-produced films financed by the big Hollywood studios; in 1970, however, the critical failure of his film Ryan's Daughter led him to take a fourteen-year break from filmmaking, during which he planned a number of film projects which never came to fruition. In 1984 he had a career revival with A Passage to India, adapted from E. M. Forster's novel, it was an instant hit with critics but proved to be the last film Lean would direct.

He received seven Academy Award for Best Director nominations, which he won twice for The Bridge on the River Kwai and Lawrence of Arabia, he has seven films in the British Film Institute's Top 100 British Films (with three of them being in the top five) and was awarded the AFI Life Achievement Award in 1990.

== Filmography ==
As director

Year	Title	Director	Writer	Ref.
1942	In Which We Serve	Yes	No	
1944	This Happy Breed	Yes	Yes	
1945	Blithe Spirit	Yes	Yes	
1945	Brief Encounter	Yes	Yes	
1946	Great Expectations	Yes	Yes	
1948	Oliver Twist	Yes	Yes	
1949	The Passionate Friends	Yes	Yes	
1950	Madeleine	Yes	No	
1952	The Sound Barrier	Yes	No	
1954	Hobson's Choice	Yes	Yes	
1955	Summertime	Yes	Yes	
1957	The Bridge on the River Kwai	Yes	No	
1962	Lawrence of Arabia	Yes	No	
1965	Doctor Zhivago	Yes	No	
1970	Ryan's Daughter	Yes	No	
1979	Lost and Found: The Story of Cook's Anchor	Yes	Yes	
1984	A Passage to India	Yes	Yes	

As editor only

Year	Title
1930	The Night Porter
1931	These Charming People
1932	Insult
1933	The Fortunate Fool
1933	The Ghost Camera
1933	Song of the Plough
1933	Matinee Idol
1933	Money for Speed
1934	Tiger Bay
1934	The Secret of the Loch
1934	Dangerous Ground
1934	Java Head
1935	Escape Me Never
1935	The Crouching Beast
1936	As You Like It
1936	Ball at Savoy
1937	Dreaming Lips
1937	The Wife of General Ling
1937	The Last Adventurers
1938	Pygmalion
1940	French Without Tears
1940	Spies of the Air
1941	Major Barbara
1941	49th Parallel
1942	One of Our Aircraft Is Missing

== Recurring collaborators ==
Work Actor	1942	1944	1945		1946	1948	1949	1950	1952	1954	1955	1957	1962	1965	1970	1984	—N/a
Work Actor	In Which We Serve	This Happy Breed	Blithe Spirit	Brief Encounter	Great Expectations	Oliver Twist	The Passionate Friends	Madeleine	The Sound Barrier	Hobson's Choice	Summertime	The Bridge on the River Kwai	Lawrence of Arabia	Doctor Zhivago	Ryan's Daughter	A Passage to India	Total roles
Celia Johnson†																	3
John Mills†																	5
Robin Burns†	U	U				U											3
Kay Walsh†																	3
Joyce Carey†																	3
Noël Coward†			VU	VU													3
Johnnie Schofield†			U														2
Everley Gregg†																	3
Bernard Miles†																	2
Kathleen Harrison†																	2
John Boxer†								U									3
Caven Watson†								U									2
James Donald†																	2
Jack May†		U		U	U												4
Stanley Holloway†																	2
Eileen Erskine†																	2
Amy Veness†								U									3
Robert Newton†																	2
Jack Sharp†		U											U				2
Trevor Howard†																	3
Frederick Kelsey†				U				U									2
Ivor Barnard†																	3
Edie Martin†										U							3
Alec Guinness†																	6
Francis L. Sullivan†																	2
Albert Chevalier†						U		U									2
Henry Edwards†								U									2
Anthony Newley†								U									2
Gibb McLaughlin†																	2
Erik Chitty†						U											2
Ann Todd†																	3
Claude Rains†																	2
John Laurie†								U									2
André Morell†											U						3
Ned Lynch†								U					U				2
Joseph Tomelty†																	2
Robert Brooks Turner†									U	U							2
Ralph Richardson†																	2
Himself†											U		U				2
Jack Hawkins†																	2
Robert Rietti†													VU	VU			2
Omar Sharif†																	2

Preceded by George Stevens for Giant	Academy Award for Best Director; 1957 for The Bridge on the River Kwai	Succeeded by Vincente Minnelli for Gigi
Preceded by Robert Wise and Jerome Robbins for West Side Story	Academy Award for Best Director; 1962 for Lawrence of Arabia	Succeeded by Tony Richardson for Tom Jones
