= Almost a Honeymoon =

Almost a Honeymoon may refer to:

- Almost a Honeymoon (play), a 1930 play by Walter Ellis
- Almost a Honeymoon (1930 film), a 1930 British film adaptation
- Almost a Honeymoon (1938 film), a 1938 British film adaptation
