= Bruno Barnabe =

English actor (1905–1998)

- in Make Mine a Million (1959)
- Born: Bruno Bianco Alberto G. G. Barnabe; 3 April 1905; St Giles, London, England
- Died: 20 June 1998 (aged 93); Surrey, England
- Occupation: Actor
- Years active: 1935–1980
- Spouse: Avice Landone (1940–1976) (her death) (1 child)

Bruno Bianco Alberto G. G. Barnabe (3 April 1905 – 20 June 1998) was an English film and stage actor. He performed in the West End, on Broadway, and in Egypt, Australia and New Zealand.

== Biography ==
Barnabe was born in St Giles, London on 3 April 1905 to Tina (née Bendi) and Louis Vincent Barnabe. He married Avice Landone, who died in 1976. He trained for the stage at the Royal Academy of Dramatic Art where he studied mime under Theodore Komisarjevsky. Barnabe served with the British Armed Forces from 1942 through 1946. He died in June 1998.

== Stage career ==
Barnabe made his first stage appearance on 4 April 1927 playing a wedding guest in The Dybbuk at the Royalty Theatre. In October 1928, Barnabe travelled to Egypt as a member of a Shakespearean company led by Robert Atkins. The following year he travelled to the United States with Ben Greet; during this trip he portrayed Everyman at Columbia University, which marked his first stage appearance in New York City. His first and only appearance on Broadway came in 1935 in the original production of Escape Me Never at the Shubert Theatre. In 1937, Barnabe went on a tour of Australia and New Zealand in a company led by Fay Compton. Other major venues at which Barnabe appeared include the Criterion Theatre, the Q Theatre and the Theatre Royal, Windsor.

== Film career ==
Barnabe appeared in films as early as 1927 and appeared on television as early as 1937. He appeared on numerous television shows throughout the 1960s and 1970s, including Maigret, Danger Island, The Troubleshooters and Jesus of Nazareth. Films in which Barnabe acted include Man in the Shadow (1957), Pit of Darkness (1961), The Mummy's Shroud (1967), and Sinbad and the Eye of the Tiger (1977). He also appeared in a television adaptation of King Richard the Second in 1978.

== Filmography ==
=== Film ===
Year	Title	Role	Notes
1935	Escape Me Never	Undetermined role	Uncredited
1936	Ball at Savoy	Train Conductor	
1936	Beloved Imposter	Policeman	
1936	The Avenging Hand	Waiter	Uncredited
1936	Second Bureau	Commissaire of Police	
1937	Wake Up Famous	Undetermined role	Uncredited
1937	Landslide	Bert White	
1937	Dreaming Lips	Rescuer	
1939	Money for Jam	Mario Dorlando	TV film
1948	L'Ultima Cena	Leonardo da Vinci	
1950	Assassin for Hire	Meyerling	TV film
1953	Always a Bride	Hotel Waiter	Uncredited
1955	The Wise Cat	Marcus	TV film
1955	Portrait of Alison	Italian Detective	
1956	The Tamer Tamed	Christopher Sly	TV film
1957	King's Rhapsody	Chief Revolutionary	TV film
1957	Italian Love Story	Franci	TV film
1957	Man in the Shadow	Italian Barber	
1957	Aladdin	The Vizier	TV film
1961	Five Golden Hours	Cesare	
1961	Pit of Darkness	Bruno	
1966	Drop Dead Darling	Head Waiter	
1967	The Mummy's Shroud	Pharaoh	
1973	The Man Who Died Twice	Poldo	TV film
1976	The Message	Umaya	
1976	The Dancing Years	Brietkopf	TV film
1977	Sinbad and the Eye of the Tiger	Balsora	
1978	King Richard the Second	Abbot of Westminster	TV film

=== Television ===
Year	Title	Role	Notes
1954	Sunday Night Theatre	Ivan Borolsky	Episode: "Ambrose Applejohn's Adventure"
1955	Sunday Night Theatre	The Prince	Episode: "It Could Happen Only in Paris"
1955	ITV Television Playhouse	Mondovi	Episode: "The Golden Fleece"
1956	ITV Television Playhouse	Meyer	Episode: "Skipper Next to God"
1957	ITV Television Playhouse	Sergeant Savoldo	Episode: "The Affair at Assino"
1957	ITV Television Playhouse	Beauvais	Episode: "Million Dollar Smile"
1957	Dixon of Dock Green	Tom Rowlands	Episode: "The Silent House"
1957	The Buccaneers	Captain Gomez	Episode: "Prize of Andalusia"
1957	The Machine Breakers	Topping, Counsel for Prosecution	Episode: "The Trial"
1957	The Errol Flynn Theatre	Hotel Manager	Episode: "Out of the Blue"
1957	Overseas Press Club – Exclusive!	Head Waiter	Episode: "Tatiana, the Czar's Daughter"
1957	The Gay Cavalier	Major Harry Jawkins	2 episodes
1957	Sword of Freedom	Girolamo	Episode: "Marriage of Convenience"
1957	Sailor of Fortune	Kleber	Episode: "Port Jeopardy"
1957	Sailor of Fortune	Peters	Episode: "The Golden Head"
1957	Sunday Night Theatre	Joshua Speed	Episode: "Abe Lincoln in Illinois"
1958	Ivanhoe	Rinaldo	Episode: "Rinaldo"
1958	The Invisible Armies	M. Biot	1 episode
1958	Sailor of Fortune	Brigadier	Episode: "The King's Four Wives"
1958	Sunday Night Theatre	Cyrus Carve	Episode: "The Great Adventure"
1958	The Sky Larks	El Rashid	Episode: "Flag-Captain"
1958	African Patrol	Frank Vincent	Episode: "Shooting Star"
1958	African Patrol	Mencken	Episode: "The Silver Story"
1958	African Patrol	Slade	Episode: "The Robbery"
1958	Armchair Theatre	Court of Appeal President	Episode: "A Gust of Wind"
1958	Armchair Theatre	Captain Rienzi	Episode: "Vendetta"
1958	ITV Play of the Week	Domenico	Episode: "The Enchanted April"
1959	Boyd Q.C.	Renato	Episode: "The Samurai Killing"
1959	Frankly Howerd		1 episode
1959	The Invisible Man	First Secretary	Episode: "The Decoy"
1959	Interpol Calling	Dekker	Episode: "No Flowers for Onno"
1959	Dial 999	Josh	Episode: "Rolling Racketeers"
1959	The Four Just Men	Mark	Episode: "The Godfather"
1959	Armchair Theatre	Dr. Gerard	Episode: "Dr Kabil"
1960	The Four Just Men	Terranti	Episode: "The Man with the Golden Touch"
1960	Counter-Attack	Mr. Prout	Series regular
1960	Knight Errant Limited	Mr. Menelli	Episode: "Little Italy"
1960	About Religion	Second Man	Episode: "The News on Good Friday"
1960	Biggles		Episode: "Biggles Follows On"
1960	Arthur's Treasured Volumes	Club Manager	Episode: "A Slight Case of Deception"
1960	The Days of Vengeance	Gregory	Episode: "A Bunch of Roses"
1960	On Trial	Mr. Poland	Episode: "W.T. Stead"
1960	Armchair Theatre	Judge	Episode: "A Heart and a Diamond"
1960	Bootsie and Snudge	Dr. O'Hara	Episode: "The Bachelor Party"
1960	International Detective	Jacontinski	Episode: "The Rainis Case"
1960	BBC Sunday-Night Play	Boris	Episode: "The Wind and the Sun"
1961	Comedy Playhouse		Episode: "The Private Lives of Edward Whiteley"
1961	Maigret	Pozzo	Episode: "The Experts"
1961	ITV Play of the Week	Ugo Pulcini	Episode: "The Girl on the Via Flaminia"
1961	Sykes and a...		Episode: "Sykes and a Salesman"
1961	The Mask of the Clown	Steven Marsh	
1961	International Detective	The Policeman	Episode: "The Martos Case"
1961	Hancock's Half Hour	BBC Official	Episode: "The Bowmans"
1961	No Hiding Place	Ex-Inspector Bowden	Episode: "Dead Ringer"
1961	Flower of Evil	Lutz	Mini-series
1961	BBC Sunday-Night Play	Mr. Cartwright	Episode: "Scene of the Accident"
1962	BBC Sunday-Night Play	Bowden	Episode: "The Alderman"
1962	Top Secret	Magella	Episode: "Escape to Danger"
1962	Outbreak of Murder	Superintendent Mainwairing	4 episodes
1962	Somerset Maugham Hour	Don Agosto	Episode: "The Closed Shop"
1962	Maigret	Judge	Episode: "Death in Mind"
1963	Harpers West One	Edmond Stilwell	1 episode
1963	Moonstrike	Inspector Saloux	Episode: "The Escape"
1963	Suspense	Manager	Episode: "Miranda and a Salesman"
1963	ITV Play of the Week	Mr. Gordon	Episode: "The Fixers"
1963	Maigret	Judge Bonville	Episode: "A Man Condemned"
1963	The Saint	Inspector Manteolli	Episode: "The King of the Beggars"
1964	The Indian Tales of Rudyard Kipling	Bahadur Khan	Episode: "The Return to Imray"
1964	The Valiant Varneys		Episode: "The Incredible Adventures of Sherlock Varney"
1964	Crane	The Master	Episode: "The Man with the Big Feet"
1964	The Avengers	Fitch	Episode: "The White Elephant"
1964	Story Parade	Mr. Byculla	Episode: "Mr. Byculla"
1965	Story Parade	Dr. Mudie	Episode: "The Old Boys"
1965	R3	Lord Green	Episode: "A Source of Contamination"
1965	199 Park Lane	Garside	3 episodes
1965	Serjeant Musgrave's Dance	The Parson	2 episodes
1965	The Mask of Janus	Secony	Episode "The Arranger"
1966	Dixon of Dock Green	Mr. Everton	Episode: "When Last Seen"
1966	The Avengers	Grand Vizier	Episode: "Honey for the Prince"
1966	Hope and Keen		Episode: "Casablanca"
1966	Play of the Month	Bordeini	Episode: "Gordon of Khartoum"
1966	The Wednesday Play	Inspector Potts	Episode: "Rodney, Our Intrepid Hero"
1966	Court Martial	Dr. Gregorio	Episode: "Let Slip the Dogs of War"
1966	The Newcomers	Brewer	4 episodes
1967	Hugh and I		Episode: "Adios, Amigos"
1967	Softly, Softly	Sanderson	Episode: "The Same the Whole World Over"
1967	Sir Arthur Conan Doyle	Ispettore di Polizia	Episode: "The New Catacomb"
1967	Danger Island	Inspector Molina	Recurring role
1967	For Schools and Colleges: Drama	Doctor	Episode: "The Man Who Could Walk Through Walls"
1967	The Troubleshooters	Dr. Giuseppe Casale	Episode: "And the Walls Came Tumbling Down"
1968	The Troubleshooters	Tariq	Episode: "The Slight Problem with the Press"
1968	Freewheelers	Alex Dmitropulous	Episode: "Recipe for Danger"
1968	Vendetta	Tito Capuana	Episode: "The Money Man"
1968	The Avengers	Farrar	Episode: "You'll Catch Your Death"
1969	Comedy Playhouse	Columnist	Episode: "As Good Cooks Go"
1969	As Good Cooks Go	Columnist	Episode: "A Good Pull Up for Bentleys"
1969	Dixon of Dock Green	Nathan	Episode: "Whose Turn Next"
1969–1970	Slim John	Miller	Series regular
1970	Doomwatch	Charles	Episode: "Spectre at the Feast"
1971	From a Bird's Eye View	Immigration Officer	Episode: "Witness for the Persecution"
1971	The Mind of Mr. J.G. Reeder	Moscrop	Episode: "The Duke"
1971	Out of the Unknown	Harvey	Episode: "This Body Is Mine"
1971	Misleading Cases	Fred Barker	Episode: "How Free Is a Freeman?"
1971	The Persuaders!	Maitre de	Episode: "Overture"
1972	Z-Cars	Clifford Lamb	Episode: "Keep to Yourself"
1972	Doomwatch	Francesco Cavalli	Episode: "The Killer Dolphins"
1973	War and Peace	General Mortier	Episode: "Moscow!"
1973	The Regiment	Mr. Smith	Episode: "Riot"
1973	Spy Trap	Emilio Mauro	Episode: "The Italian Link"
1974	Centre Play	Mr. Brown	Episode: "My Last Duchess"
1974	Father Brown	Buller	Episode: "The Mirror of the Magistrate"
1975	Oil Strike North	Director	Episode: "Headhunters"
1977	Jesus of Nazareth	Ezra	Mini-series
1980	Minder	Mario	Episode: "The Dessert Song"
