= Admirals All (play) =

1934 play by Ian Hay and Stephen King-Hall

- Written by: Ian Hay; Stephen King-Hall
- Original language: English
- Genre: Adventure comedy

Premiere
- Date premiered: 30 July 1934
- Place premiered: Kings Theatre, Southsea

Admirals All is a 1934 adventure comedy play by the British writers Ian Hay and Stephen King-Hall about a film star who becomes mixed up with the Royal Navy and Chinese pirates.

It premiered at the Kings Theatre, Southsea in the naval town of Portsmouth before transferring to the West End. It ran for 192 performances at the Shaftesbury Theatre and then the Cambridge Theatre between 6 August 1934 and 19 January 1935. It marked the West End debut of Hollywood film actress Laura La Plante, then in London making films for Warner Brothers at Teddington Studios. The cast also included Diana Beaumont, Jack Hobbs, Frederick Burtwell, Geoffrey Sumner and Aubrey Mather.

== Film adaptation ==
In 1935 it was turned into a film of the same title directed by Victor Hanbury and starring Wynne Gibson, Gordon Harker and Anthony Bushell.

== Bibliography ==
- Goble, Alan. The Complete Index to Literary Sources in Film. Walter de Gruyter, 1999.
- Wearing, J.P. The London Stage 1930-1939: A Calendar of Productions, Performers, and Personnel. Rowman & Littlefield, 2014.
