= The Crouching Beast (novel) =

1928 novel

- Author: Valentine Williams
- Language: English
- Series: Clubfoot
- Genre: Spy thriller
- Publisher: Hodder and Stoughton; Houghton Mifflin (US)
- Publication date: 1928
- Publication place: United Kingdom
- Media type: Print
- Preceded by: Clubfoot the Avenger
- Followed by: The Gold Comfit Box

The Crouching Beast is a 1928 spy thriller novel by the British author Valentine Williams. It is part of his series of novels and short stories featuring the character of "Clubfoot", the alias of Doctor Adolph Grunt a brilliant but sinister German secret service mastermind. It is set in Constantinople, capital of the Ottoman Empire, during the First World War.

== Film adaptation ==
In 1935 it was adapted into a British film of the same title directed by Victor Hanbury and starring Fritz Kortner, Wynne Gibson and Andrews Engelmann.

== Bibliography ==
- Burton, Alan. Historical Dictionary of British Spy Fiction. Rowman & Littlefield, 2016.
- Goble, Alan. The Complete Index to Literary Sources in Film. Walter de Gruyter, 1999.
- Reilly, John M. Twentieth Century Crime & Mystery Writers. Springer, 2015.
