= Jill Esmond =

English actress (1908–1990)

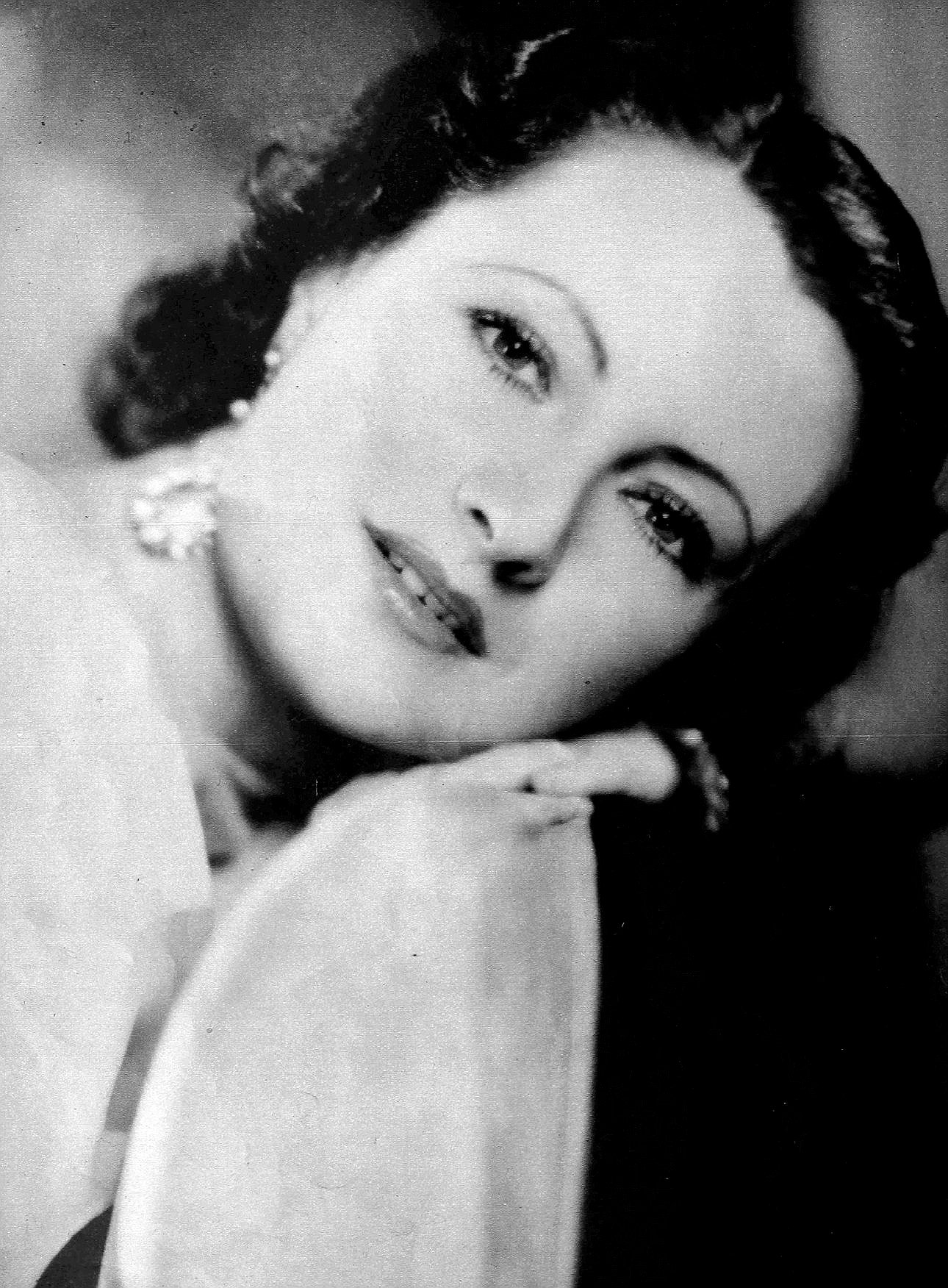
- Esmond in 1932
- Born: Jill Esmond Jack; 26 January 1908; London, England
- Died: 28 July 1990 (aged 82); Wandsworth, London, England
- Occupation: Actress
- Years active: 1924–1956
- Spouse: Laurence Olivier (m. 1930; div. 1940)
- Children: 1
- Parent(s): Henry V. Esmond; Eva Moore

Jill Esmond (26 January 1908 – 28 July 1990) was an English actress of stage and screen.

== Early life ==
Jill Esmond Jack was born in London, the daughter of stage actors Henry V. Esmond (né Harry Esmond Jack) and Eva Moore. Dramatist W.S. Gilbert and actress Maxine Elliott were her godparents. She had a brother Jack (né Jack Esmond Jack; 1899-1980) and a sister, Lynette Esmond Jack (born 1894), who died in infancy.

While her parents toured with theatre companies, Esmond spent her childhood in boarding schools until she decided at the age of 14 to become an actress. She made her stage debut playing Wendy to Gladys Cooper's Peter Pan, but her success was short-lived. When her father died suddenly in 1922, in Paris, due to pneumonia, Esmond returned to school and at the time considered abandoning her ambition to act. After reassessing her future and coming to terms with her father's death, she studied with the Royal Academy of Dramatic Art in London, and returned to the West End stage in 1924. In 1925, she starred with her mother in a play Mary, Mary Quite Contrary, and after a few more successful roles, won critical praise for her part as a young suicide in Outward Bound.

== Marriage and career ==
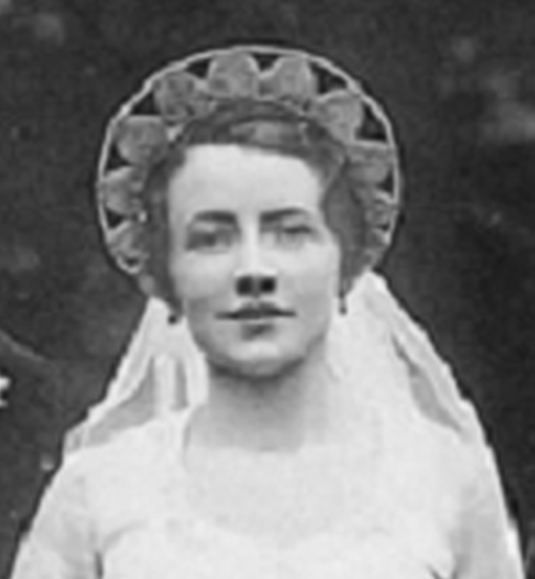
Esmond in 1930

In 1928, Esmond (billed as Jill Esmond Moore) appeared in the production of Bird in the Hand, where she met fellow cast member Laurence Olivier for the first time. Three weeks later, he proposed to her. In his autobiography Olivier later wrote that he was smitten with Esmond, and that her cool indifference to him did nothing but further his ardour. When Bird in the Hand was being staged on Broadway, Esmond was chosen to join the American production – but Olivier was not.

Determined to be near Esmond, Olivier travelled to New York City where he found work as an actor. Esmond won rave reviews for her performance. Olivier continued to follow Esmond, and after proposing to her several times, she agreed and the couple were married on 25 July 1930 at All Saints', Margaret Street, London. Within weeks, the couple regretted their marriage. They had one son, Tarquin Olivier.

Returning to the United Kingdom, Esmond made her film debut with a starring role in an early Alfred Hitchcock film The Skin Game (1931), and over the next few years appeared in several British and (pre-Code) Hollywood films, including Thirteen Women (1932). She also appeared in two Broadway productions with Olivier, Private Lives in 1931 with Noël Coward and Gertrude Lawrence and The Green Bay Tree in 1933.

Esmond's career continued to ascend while Olivier's own career languished, but after a couple of years, when his career began to show promise, she began to refuse roles. Esmond had been promised a role by David O. Selznick in A Bill of Divorcement (1932) but at only half-salary. Olivier had discovered that Katharine Hepburn had been offered a much greater salary, and persuaded Esmond to turn down the role. Esmond and Olivier starred together in one film, No Funny Business (1933), a British comedy film directed by Victor Hanbury.

In 1937, Esmond and Olivier appeared together in Shakespeare's "Twelfth Night" at London's Old Vic theatre. During this period, their marriage was disintegrating, as Olivier had started a relationship with Vivien Leigh.

== Later years ==
Esmond starred in the Broadway production of Emlyn Williams' play The Morning Star in 1942, a production which featured the acting debut of Gregory Peck. Her acting appearances grew more sporadic with the passage of time, and she made her final film appearance in 1955, around the time she made her two appearances as Eleanor of Aquitaine in the TV series The Adventures of Robin Hood.

== Personal life ==
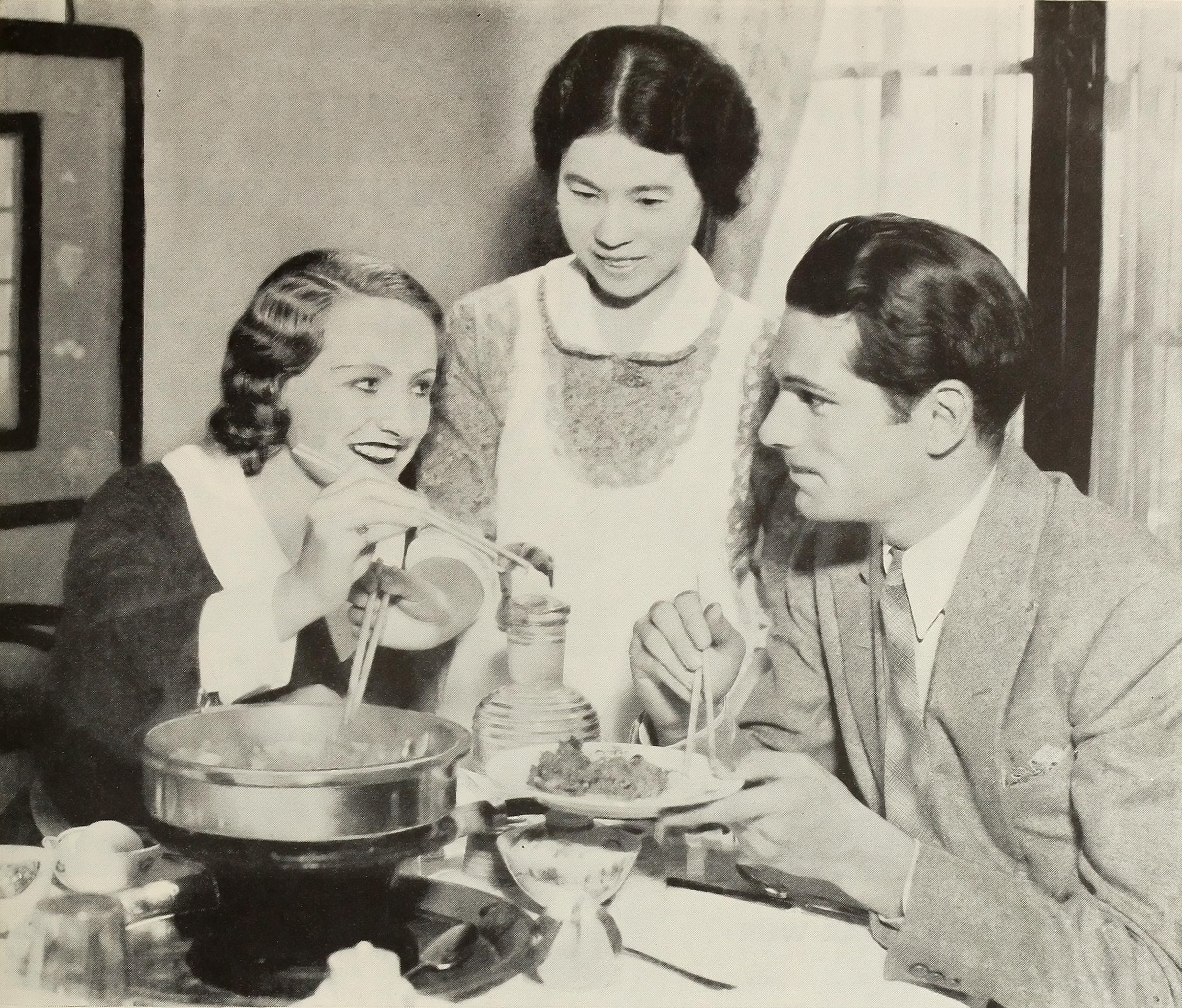
Esmond with Olivier in 1932

Esmond was married to Olivier between 1930 and 1940; they had one son, Tarquin Olivier (born 21 August 1936). During their marriage, Olivier had affairs with Ann Todd and Vivien Leigh; he was married to the latter (Leigh) from 1940 to 1960. Olivier later said that "I couldn't help myself with Vivien. No man could. I hated myself for cheating on Jill, but then I had cheated before, but this was something different. This wasn't just out of lust. This was love that I really didn't ask for but was drawn into."

Esmond withstood the publicity of Olivier's affair with Vivien Leigh and did not seek a divorce. Pressed by Olivier, who was anxious to marry Leigh, she eventually agreed and they were divorced on 29 January 1940. Among the films she appeared in are Journey for Margaret, The Pied Piper and Random Harvest, all in 1942, My Pal Wolf (1944), The White Cliffs of Dover (1944) and The Bandit of Sherwood Forest (1946). In 1946, she returned to the UK where she resumed her acting; her last stage appearance was in 1950, and her last film in 1955.

To the end of his life, Olivier continued alimony payments to Esmond. (Note: Some authors suggested that in her later years, Esmond discussed the bitterness she felt towards Olivier. It was speculated that she felt she had sacrificed her career so that he could further his own, only to find herself cruelly discarded.) Esmond kept in touch with Olivier, and in a letter to their son Tarquin, said "It's funny after all that time how I can still love him so much." Frail and in a wheelchair, she attended Olivier's memorial service in October 1989 at Westminster Abbey.

== Death ==
Esmond was 82 years old when she died on 28 July 1990 in Wandsworth, London.

== Complete filmography ==
- The Chinese Bungalow (1930) - Jean
- The Skin Game (1931) - Jill Hillcrist
- The Eternal Feminine (1931) - Claire Lee
- Once a Lady (1931) - Faith Penwick the Girl
- Ladies of the Jury (1932) - Mrs. Yvette Gordon
- State's Attorney (1932) - Lillian Ulrich
- Is My Face Red? (1932) - Mildred Huntington
- Thirteen Women (1932) - Jo Turner
- F.P.1 Doesn't Answer (1933) - Claire Lennartz
- No Funny Business (1933) - Anne
- On the Spot (1938, version of the 1938 TV movie) - Minn Lee
- Prison Without Bars (1939, TV Movie) - Carol Linden, Superintendent
- On the Sunny Side (1942) - Mrs. Aylesworth
- This Above All (1942) - Nurse Emily Harvey
- Eagle Squadron (1942) - Phyllis
- The Pied Piper (1942) - Mrs. Cavanaugh
- Journey for Margaret (1942) - Susan Fleming
- Random Harvest (1942) - Lydia
- The White Cliffs of Dover (1944) - Rosamund
- Casanova Brown (1944) - Dr. Zernerke
- My Pal Wolf (1944) - Miss Elizabeth Munn
- The Bandit of Sherwood Forest (1946) - The Queen Mother
- Bedelia (1946) - Nurse Harris
- Escape (1948) - Grace Winton
- Private Information (1952) - Charlotte
- Night People (1954) - Frau Schindler
- A Man Called Peter (1955) - Mrs. Findlay

== Selected stage appearances ==
- Gertie Maude by John Van Druten (1937)
- The Morning Star by Emlyn Williams (1942)
- Party Manners by Val Gielgud (1950)
