= Return of a Stranger =

Return of a Stranger may refer to:

- Return of a Stranger (1937 film), a 1937 British drama film
- Return of a Stranger (1961 film), a 1961 British thriller film
