= Wings Over Africa =

- Directed by: Ladislao Vajda
- Written by: Ákos Tolnay; Marjorie Deans; Reginald Long; Patrick Kirwan
- Produced by: John Stafford
- Starring: Joan Gardner; Ian Colin; James Harcourt; James Carew
- Cinematography: James Wilson
- Edited by: Julian Wintle
- Music by: Jack Beaver
- Production company: Premier-Stafford Productions
- Distributed by: RKO Pictures
- Release date: 23 September 1936
- Running time: 63 minutes
- Country: United Kingdom
- Language: English

Wings Over Africa is a 1936 British adventure film directed by Ladislao Vajda and starring Joan Gardner, Ian Colin, James Harcourt and James Carew. It was written by Ákos Tolnay, Marjorie Deans, Reginald Long and Patrick Kirwan.

The film is a quota quickie produced for released by RKO.

== Plot ==
Explorer Tony Cooper and homesick trader Norton find a skeleton in the African jungle with a package intended to be delivered to Victor Wilkins in London. Cooper takes it there and it proves to be from Wilkins' brother – the skeleton was his – with a map showing where he left £100,000 in diamonds for Victor. Cooper agrees to accompany him to Africa and they hire pilots John Trevor and Carol Reed, who all agree to a cut of the profits. On arrival in Africa, they're challenged by three men – Redfern, Collins and Quincey – who claim to have the mineral rights to all gems found in the area, and by Norton, who also wants a share. But Norton is stabbed to death and Trevor fatally wounded: suspicion falls on Cooper, who's in love with Carol. Carol investigates and finds the weapon in the possession of Wilkins, who wanted the diamonds all for himself. He tries to flee in one of the planes but crashes and is killed.

== Cast ==
- Joan Gardner as Carol Reade
- Ian Colin as Tony Cooper
- James Harcourt as Wikins
- James Carew as Norton
- James Craven as John Trevor
- Alan Napier as Redfern
- Phil Thomas as Quincey
- Charles Oliver as Collins
- Rufus Fennell as Saoud

== Production ==
The film was shot at Shepperton Studios with sets designed by the art director Duncan Sutherland. The film score was by composer Jack Beaver.

== Reception ==
Kine Weekly wrote: "The producer seems to have had some difficulty in combining the African scenes with the human drama enacted therein. The lions and zebras and long-tailed monkeys are genuine enough, but it is their relation to the drama itself which does not seem too well established. ... In his quiet, effective way James Harcourt puts up the best performance as the apparently harmless Wilkins, who turns out to be a homicidal maniac. Ian Colin makes a handsome hero, and Joan Gardner does her best with the rather sketchy part of Carol, the intrepid airwoman. James Carew, as a gruff stick-at-nothing settler, is convincing in a super-heavy role, and Alan Nokes mildly effective as a sort ol honest go-between in the Amrican feud. ... Taken singly, and divorced from the drama itself, many of the ghmpses we get ol the denizens of the African forest are worthy of the best sort of exploration ilm. But the actual settings of hut and camp hardiy bear out the illusion that we are really witnessing a story set in Africa."

Picturegoer wrote: "Very loosely knit story of a diamond hunt, in which murder plays a part, and into which are introduced shots of aerial travel and wild-life sequences. These latter are good, but the story proper is not too well developed and has little of the real thrill one expects to find in a plot of this kind. James Harcourt is quietly effective as an elderly clerk who goes after the treasure and later turns out to be a homicidal maniac, while Ian Colin is sound as the hero and Joan Gardner fair as the heroine, an intrepid woman pilot."

The Daily Film Renter wrote: "Crudely presented and indifferently photographed airplane trip from Croydon to Cape Town. Scenes switch with little regard to continuity, while scant details are forthcoming regarding points of interest. Main items of note are shots of Kilimanjaro and vast cloudscapes. ... Native war dances, African markets, nebulous glimpses of wild beasts, and panoramic shots of big cities, are the main ingredients of the picture. Kilimanjaro is well photographed, as are also great cloudscapes, but the rest of the sequences are crudely shown and marred by tinting. The commentary of R. E. Jeffrey is adequate, if a little on the side of facetiousness at times."
