= Almost a Honeymoon (play) =

1930 play by Walter Ellis

Almost a Honeymoon is a 1930 play by Walter Ellis. It debuted at the Garrick Theatre in London and later enjoyed a successful run at the Apollo Theatre. A farce it concerns a young man who has secured a lucrative post in the colonial service. His problem is that the post requires him to be married, and he has just a day to find a woman to be his wife.

== Original cast ==
- Charles – Hylton Allen/George Relph
- Bailiff – Christopher Steele
- Basil Dibley – Gerald Pring
- Cuthbert de Grey – Lamont Dickinson
- Mr. Dixon – Edward Thane
- Taxi Driver – Barry Lyndon
- Margaret Brent – Grace Lane
- Rosalie Quilter – Renee Kelly/Mercia Swinburne

== Adaptations ==
The play was twice adapted for film. In 1930 Almost a Honeymoon directed by Monty Banks and starring Clifford Mollison and Dodo Watts and in 1938 Almost a Honeymoon directed by Norman Lee and starring Tommy Trinder and Linden Travers.

== Bibliography ==
- Smith, Leslie. Modern British Farce. Barnes and Noble, 1989.
