= Alan Napier =

English actor (1903–1988)

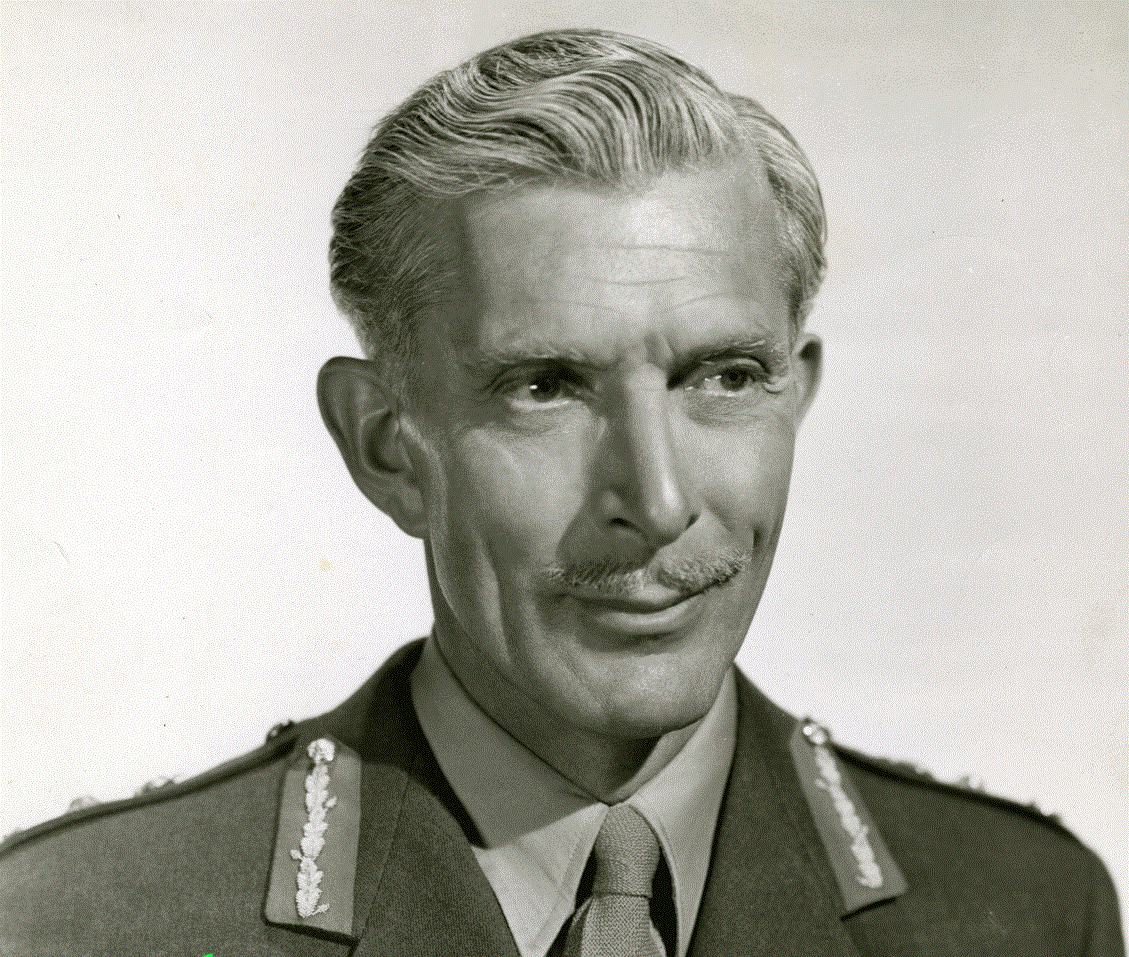
- Napier in 1949
- Born: Alan William Napier-Clavering; 7 January 1903; King's Norton, Birmingham, England
- Died: 8 August 1988 (aged 85); Santa Monica, California, U.S.
- Resting place: Cremated; ashes scattered in the garden of his home in Pacific Palisades, California
- Education: Clifton College; Royal Academy of Dramatic Art
- Years active: 1920s–1981
- Spouses: Emily Nancy Bevill Pethybridge (m. 1930; div. 1944) Aileen Dickens Hawksley (m. 1944; died 1961)

Alan William Napier-Clavering (7 January 1903 – 8 August 1988), better known as Alan Napier, was an English actor. After a decade in West End theatre, he had a long film career in Britain and later in Hollywood. Napier is best remembered for portraying Alfred Pennyworth, Bruce Wayne's butler in the 1960s live-action Batman television series.

== Early life and career ==
Alan William Napier-Clavering was born on 7 January 1903 in Birmingham, to Claude Gerald Napier-Clavering, managing director of the Birmingham Guild of Handicraft, and Millicent Mary, daughter of politician William Kenrick. He had two older siblings, Mark (born 1898) and Mary Helen "Molly" (born 1900). The Napier-Clavering family were landed gentry—the senior line owning Axwell Park near Gateshead until 1920—and descended from Francis Napier, 8th Lord Napier.

Napier was a first cousin once removed of Neville Chamberlain, Britain's prime minister from 1937 to 1940. He was educated at Packwood Haugh School and, after leaving Clifton College, he studied at the Royal Academy of Dramatic Art, graduating in 1925.

Napier was engaged by the Oxford Players, where he worked with the likes of John Gielgud and Robert Morley. As Napier recalled, his "ridiculously tall" 6-foot-6-inch (1.98 m) height almost cost him his position immediately after he secured it. J. B. Fagan had dismissed Tyrone Guthrie because he was too tall for most parts. Napier was interviewed (and accepted) as Guthrie's replacement while sitting down. Fagan realised that Napier was even taller than Guthrie when he stood up, but honoured his commitment. Napier performed for ten years (1929–1939) on the West End stage. Napier described himself as having a particular affinity for the work of George Bernard Shaw, and in 1937 appeared in a London revival of Heartbreak House supervised by Shaw himself.

Napier made his American stage debut as the romantic lead opposite Gladys George in Lady in Waiting. Though his film career had begun in Britain in the 1930s, he had very little success before the cameras until he joined the British expatriate community in Hollywood in 1941. There he spent time with such people as James Whale, a fellow ex-Oxford Player. He appeared in such films as Random Harvest (1942), Cat People (1942) and The Uninvited (1944). In The Song of Bernadette (1943), he played the ethically questionable psychiatrist who is hired to declare Bernadette mentally ill. He also played the vicious Earl of Warwick in Joan of Arc (1948). He performed in two Shakespearean films: the Orson Welles Macbeth (1948), in which he played a priest that Welles added to the story, who spoke lines originally uttered by other characters, and MGM's Julius Caesar (1953), as Cicero. He played Sean Connery's father in the Alfred Hitchcock movie Marnie (1964).

In 1949, Napier made an appearance on the short-lived television anthology series Your Show Time as Sherlock Holmes, in an adaptation of "The Adventure of the Speckled Band". In the 1950s, he appeared on TV in four episodes of Alfred Hitchcock Presents and guest starred on Dale Robertson's NBC western series Tales of Wells Fargo. He had a recurring role as General Steele on the 1962–1963 situation comedy Don't Call Me Charlie!

== Batman ==
In 1965, Napier was the first to be cast in the Batman TV series, as Bruce Wayne's faithful butler Alfred Pennyworth, a role he played until the series' cancellation in 1968.

I had never read comics before [I was hired for Batman]. My agent rang up and said, 'I think you are going to play on "Batman,"' I said 'What is "Batman"?' He said, 'Don't you read the comics?' I said, 'No, never.' He said, 'I think you are going to be Batman's butler.' I said, 'How do I know I want to be Batman's butler?' It was the most ridiculous thing I had ever heard of. He said, 'It may be worth over $100,000.' So I said I was Batman's butler.

== Later life and career ==
Napier's career extended into the 1980s with roles on television, including the miniseries QB VII, The Bastard and Centennial, and the drama The Paper Chase. He retired in 1981, aged 78.

In early 1988, Napier appeared in a wheelchair on the late-night talk show The Late Show as part of a reunion of the surviving cast of Batman.

== Family ==
Napier was twice married. His second wife, Aileen Dickens Hawksley, was a great-granddaughter of novelist Charles Dickens. Hawksley's daughter from a previous marriage, actress Jennifer Raine, was the mother of former child actor Brian Forster, best known as "Chris Partridge" on the 1970s television show The Partridge Family.

== Death ==
Napier suffered a stroke in 1987, was hospitalised from June 1988, and was gravely ill for several days before his death of natural causes on 8 August 1988, in the Berkley East Convalescent Hospital in Santa Monica, California. He was 85 years old.

== Autobiography ==
In the early 1970s, Napier wrote a three-volume autobiography which was not published at the time because, as he joked, "I haven't committed a major crime and I'm not known to have slept with any famous actresses." In 2015, McFarland Press published the book under the title Not Just Batman's Butler, with Napier's original text annotated and updated by James Bigwood.

== Partial filmography ==
- Caste (1930) as Capt. Hawtree
- Stamboul (1931) as Bouchier
- In a Monastery Garden (1932) as Count Romano
- Loyalties (1933) as Gen. Canynge
- Wings Over Africa (1936) as Redfern
- For Valour (1937) as General
- The Wife of General Ling (1937) as Governor
- The Four Just Men (1939) as Sir Hamar Ryman
- We Are Not Alone (1939) as Archdeacon
- The Invisible Man Returns (1940) as Willie Spears
- The House of the Seven Gables (1940) as Fuller
- Confirm or Deny (1940) as Updyke (scenes deleted)
- Eagle Squadron (1942) as Black Watch officer
- A Yank at Eton (1942) as Restaurateur (uncredited)
- Cat People (1942) as Doc Carver (uncredited)
- Random Harvest (1942) as Julian
- Assignment in Brittany (1943) as Sam Wells
- Appointment in Berlin (1943) as Col. Patterson (uncredited)
- Lassie Come Home (1943) as Jock
- Madame Curie (1943) as Dr. Bladh (uncredited)
- The Song of Bernadette (1943) as Dr. Debeau (uncredited)
- Lost Angel (1943) as Dr. Woodring
- The Uninvited (1944) as Dr. Scott
- Action in Arabia (1944) as Eric Latimer
- The Hairy Ape (1944) as MacDougald, Chief Engineer
- Ministry of Fear (1944) as Dr. JM Forrester
- Thirty Seconds Over Tokyo (1944) as Mr. Parker
- Dark Waters (1944) as The Doctor (uncredited)
- Mademoiselle Fifi (1944) as The Count de Breville
- Hangover Square (1945) as Sir Henry Chapman
- Isle of the Dead (1945) as St. Aubyn
- Three Strangers (1946) as David Shackleford
- House of Horrors (1946) as F. Holmes Harmon
- A Scandal in Paris (1946) as Houdon De Pierremont, Police Minister
- The Strange Woman (1946) as Judge Henry Saladine
- Sinbad the Sailor (1947) as Aga
- Fiesta (1947) as The Tourist
- High Conquest (1947) as Tommy Donlin
- Ivy (1947) as Sir Jonathan Wright
- Adventure Island (1947) as Attwater
- Lured (1947) as Detective Gordon
- Driftwood (1947) as Dr. Nicholas Adams
- Unconquered (1947) as Sir William Johnson
- Forever Amber (1947) as Landale
- The Lone Wolf in London (1947) as Monty Beresford
- Johnny Belinda (1948) as Defense Attorney
- Macbeth (1948) as A Holy Father
- Joan of Arc (1948) as Earl of Warwick
- Hills of Home (1948) as Sir George
- Criss Cross (1949) as Finchley
- My Own True Love (1949) as Kittredge
- Tarzan's Magic Fountain (1949) as Douglas Jessup
- A Connecticut Yankee in King Arthur's Court (1949) as High Executioner
- Manhandled (1949) as Alton Bennet
- The Red Danube (1949) as The General
- Challenge to Lassie (1949) as Lord Provost
- Master Minds (1949) as Dr. Druzik
- Tripoli (1950) as Khalil
- Double Crossbones (1951) as Capt. Kidd
- Tarzan's Peril (1951) as Commissioner Peters
- The Great Caruso (1951) as Jean de Reszke
- The Highwayman (1951) as Barton
- Across the Wide Missouri (1951) as Capt. Humberstone Lyon
- The Blue Veil (1951) as Prof. George Carter
- The Strange Door (1951) as Count Grassin
- Big Jim McLain (1952) as Sturak
- Julius Caesar (1953) as Cicero
- Young Bess (1953) as Robert Tyrwhitt
- Désirée (1954) as Despreaux
- Moonfleet (1955) as Parson Glennie
- The Court Jester (1956) as Sir Brockhurst
- Miami Exposé (1956) as Raymond Sheridan
- The Mole People (1956) as Elinu, the High Priest
- Until They Sail (1957) as Prosecution Attorney
- Island of Lost Women (1959) as Dr. Paul Lujan
- Journey to the Center of the Earth (1959) as Dean
- Wild in the Country (1961) as Prof. Joe B. Larson (uncredited)
- Tender Is the Night (1962) as Señor Pardo
- The Premature Burial (1962) as Dr. Gideon Gault
- The Sword in the Stone (1963) as Sir Pellinore (voice)
- Marnie (1964) as Mr. Rutland
- Mary Poppins (1964) as Huntsman / Reporter #3 / Hound (voice, uncredited)
- My Fair Lady (1964) as Gentleman who escorts Eliza to the Queen of Transylvania (uncredited)
- Signpost to Murder (1964) as The Vicar
- 36 Hours (1964) as Col. Peter MacLean
- The Loved One (1965) as English Club Official
- Batman (1966) as Alfred Pennyworth

== Partial television credits ==
- Your Show Time (1949), season 1 episode 10: "The Adventure of the Speckled Band" as Sherlock Holmes
- Alfred Hitchcock Presents (1955), season 1 episode 5: "Into Thin Air" aka "The Vanishing Lady" as Sir Everett
- Alfred Hitchcock Presents (1956), season 1 episode 26: "Whodunit" as Wilfred - The Recording Angel
- Alfred Hitchcock Presents (1957), season 2 episodes 25, 26, 27: "I Killed the Count" Part 1, Part 2, Part 3 as Lord Sorrington
- Alfred Hitchcock Presents (1959), season 4 episode 24: "The Avon Emeralds" as Sir Charles Harrington
- Don't Call Me Charlie! (1962–1963 TV series), recurring role as General Steele
- The Alfred Hitchcock Hour (1963) (season 1 episode 26: "An Out for Oscar") as Mr. Hodges
- Twilight Zone (1963) episode "Passage on the Lady Anne" as Captain Protheroe
- Daniel Boone (1965) S1/E26–27 "Cain's Birthday" (Parts 1 & 2) as Colonel Sir Hubert Crater
- Daniel Boone (1965) S2/E13 "The Perilous Journey" as Lord Brisbane
- The Alfred Hitchcock Hour (1965) (season 3 episode 22: "Thou Still Unravished Bride") as Guerny, Sr.
- Batman (1966–1968) as Alfred Pennyworth
- The Beverly Hillbillies (1967) episode "The Clampetts In London" as Chemist
- Family Affair (1969) S3/E17 "Oh to be in England" as Mr. Wills
- Ironside (1970, 1973, 1974)
- QB VII (1974 miniseries) as Semple
- The Bastard (1978 miniseries) as Dr. Bleeker
- Centennial (1979 miniseries) as Lord Venneford

Preceded by Eric Wilton	Alfred Pennyworth actor 1966–1968	Succeeded by Michael Gough
