= Courier to Marrakesh =

1944 novel

- Author: Valentine Williams
- Language: English
- Series: Clubfoot
- Genre: Spy thriller
- Publisher: Hodder and Stoughton; Houghton Mifflin (US)
- Publication date: 1944
- Publication place: United Kingdom
- Media type: Print
- Preceded by: The Spider's Touch

Courier to Marrakesh is a 1944 spy thriller novel by the British author Valentine Williams. It is the last in his series of novels featuring the character of "Clubfoot", the mastermind of the German secret service. While the character had initially appeared in stories set during the First World War, the final novel updated the series to the Second World War.

== Bibliography ==
- Burton, Alan. Historical Dictionary of British Spy Fiction. Rowman & Littlefield, 2016.
- Krebs, Katja. Cultural Dissemination and Translational Communities: German Drama in English Translation 1900-1914. Routledge, 2014.
- Reilly, John M. Twentieth Century Crime & Mystery Writers. Springer, 2015.
