= Wake Up Famous =

- Nelson Keys in the film.
- Directed by: Gene Gerrard
- Written by: Basil Mason
- Produced by: John Stafford
- Starring: Gene Gerrard; Nelson Keys; H. F. Maltby
- Cinematography: James Wilson
- Music by: Jack Beaver
- Production company: Premier-Stafford Productions
- Distributed by: RKO
- Release date: 2 August 1937
- Running time: 68 minutes
- Country: United Kingdom
- Language: English

Wake Up Famous is a 1937 British musical comedy film directed Gene Gerrard and starring Gerrard, Nelson Keys and H. F. Maltby. It was written by Basil Mason, and made at Shepperton Studios.

== Preservation status ==
The British Film Institute National Archive holds a collection of stills but no film or video materials.

== Cast ==
- Nelson Keys as Alfred Dimbleden
- Gene Gerrard as Fink
- Bela Mila as Agatha Dimbleden
- Josephine Huntley Wright as Daisy
- Fred Conyngham as Jack
- H. F. Maltby as Sir Weatherby Watts
- Bruno Barnabe
- Leo de Pokorny
- Joan White

== Reception ==
The Monthly Film Bulletin wrote: "Gene Gerrard is part author of the story, one of the main actors, and its director. These diverse activities have been unfortunate for the film. The story is of the loose and casual kind frequent in farces, and needing strong direction to pull it together. This it has not had. There are amusing sequences, but there are also dull patches and the pace is slow. The cast work hard with rather poor material. ... This is a film which will appeal chiefly to admirers of Nelson Keys and Gene Gerrard."

Kine Weekly wrote: "A farcical comedy with music, this picture provides in its unpretentious way fair average light entertainment. The plot is rather haphazardly pieced together, but the co-stars reveal a little adaptability and resource, and it is mainly their efforts, supported by moderately good stage craft, that result in a fair modicum of laughs."
