= Beloved Imposter =

1936 British film by Victor Hanbury

- Directed by: Victor Hanbury
- Written by: Ethel Mannin (novel); Connery Chappell
- Produced by: John Stafford
- Starring: Rene Ray; Fred Conyngham; Germaine Aussey; Charles Oliver
- Music by: Jack Beaver
- Production company: John Stafford Productions
- Distributed by: RKO Pictures
- Release date: 1936
- Running time: 86 minutes
- Country: United Kingdom
- Language: English

Beloved Imposter is a 1936 British musical film directed by Victor Hanbury and starring Rene Ray, Fred Conyngham and Germaine Aussey. It was made at Welwyn Studios and released as a quota film by RKO Pictures. It was written by Connery Chappell based on the novel Dancing Boy by Ethel Mannin.

== Cast ==
- Rene Ray as Mary
- Fred Conyngham as George
- Germaine Aussey as La Lumiere
- Charles Oliver as Pierre
- Penelope Parkes as Connie
- Edwin Ellis as Herbert
- Fred Groves as Jack Harding
- Bela Mila as Mona
- Tony De Lungo as Govani
- Laurence Hanray as Arthur
- Leslie 'Hutch' Hutchinson as pianist
- Gwen Farrar as singer
- Sidney Culver as Horace
- Phil Thomas as Hodges
- Quentin McPhearson as Mr. Watts
- Reginald Long as Mr. Sladen
- Dino Galvani as manager of cabaret
- Scott Harrold as Davis
- Billy Wells as policeman
- Bruno Barnabe as policeman

== Reception ==
Picturegoer wrote: "This adaptation of Ethel Mannin's book runs to length and is apt to become wearisome. It has touches of humanity and the theme has possibilities which have not been well exploited. ... One of the picture's main defects is the introduction of 'turns' whch only succeeds in holding up the plot. The final murder is effective, but it is spoilt by the consequent anti-climax."

In British Sound Films: The Studio Years 1928–1959 David Quinlan rated the film as "mediocre", writing: "Wearisome musical drama somewhat enlivened by Rene Ray's performance."
