= The Morning Star (play) =

1941 play by Emlyn Williams

- Original language: English
- Written by: Emlyn Williams
- Genre: Drama
- Setting: London, 1940, during The Blitz

Premiere
- Date: 1 December 1941
- Place: Royal Court Theatre, Liverpool

The Morning Star is a 1941 play by the British actor and writer Emlyn Williams. It portrayed life in wartime London during The Blitz and featured the simulation of an air raid. It take place in a drawing room of a house in Chelsea.

It premiered at the Royal Court Theatre in Liverpool before transferring to the Globe Theatre in London's West End where it ran for 475 performances between 10 December 1941 and 12 December 1942. The London cast included Williams, Frederick Lloyd, Roddy Hughes, Gladys Henson, Elliott Mason, Angela Baddeley, Ambrosine Phillpotts and Betty Ann Davies. In 1942 it appeared at the Morosco Theatre on Broadway. The Broadway version starred Gregory Peck alongside Gladys Cooper, Jill Esmond, Wendy Barrie and Rhys Williams.

== Bibliography ==
- Fishgall, Gary. Gregory Peck: A Biography. Simon and Schuster, 2002.
- Stephens, John Russell. Emlyn Williams: The Making of a Dramatist. Seren, 2000.
- Wearing, J. P. The London Stage 1940–1949: A Calendar of Productions, Performers, and Personnel. Rowman & Littlefield, 2014.
