= Anthony Eustrel =

English actor (1902–1979)

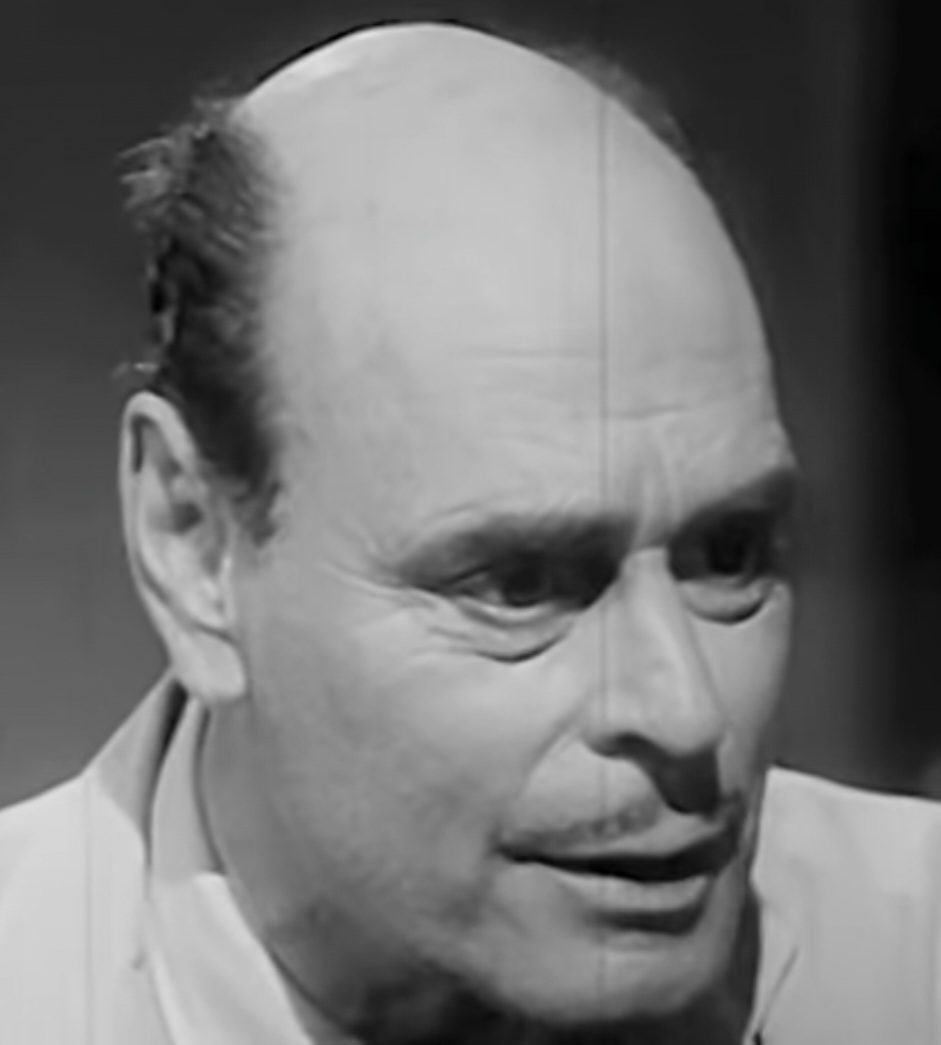
- Eustrel in an episode of One Step Beyond (1960)
- Born: 12 October 1902; London, England
- Died: 2 July 1979 (aged 76); Woodland Hills, Los Angeles, California, U.S.
- Resting place: Chapel of the Pines Crematory
- Occupation: Actor
- Years active: 1936–1972

Anthony Eustrel (12 October 1902 – 2 July 1979) was an English actor.

== Biography ==
Eustrel made guest appearances on television programs such as Perry Mason, Maverick, Peter Gunn, 77 Sunset Strip, My Favorite Martian, Hogan's Heroes and Get Smart.

Eustrel died in Woodland Hills, California. His ashes are inurned at Chapel of the Pines Crematory.

== Selected filmography ==
- Second Bureau (1936) - Lieutenant von Stranmer
- The Wife of General Ling (1937) - See Long
- Under the Red Robe (1937) - Lieutenant Brissac
- Gasbags (1940) - Gestapo Officer
- The Silver Fleet (1943) - Lieutenant Wernicke
- The Adventures of Tartu (1943) - German MP Officer
- Yellow Canary (1943) - Commissionaire (uncredited)
- I Know Where I'm Going! (1945) - Hooper
- Caesar and Cleopatra (1945) - Achillas
- Counterblast (1948) - Dr. Richard Forrester
- Adam and Evalyn (1949) - 1st Man at Restaurant Bar (uncredited)
- The Story of Robin Hood and His Merrie Men (1952) - Archbishop of Canterbury
- Titanic (1953) - Sanderson - White Star Representative (uncredited)
- East of Sumatra (1953) - Clyde
- The Robe (1953) - Sarpedon (uncredited)
- Captain John Smith and Pocahontas (1953) - King James
- King Richard and the Crusaders (1954) - Baron de Vaux
- The Silver Chalice (1954) - Maximus, the Ship's Master (uncredited)
- The Sea Chase (1955) - British Vice-Admiral (uncredited)
- Lady Godiva of Coventry (1955) - Prior
- Alfred Hitchcock Presents (1956) (Season 1 Episode 36: "Mink") as Leslie Ronalds
- Lust for Life (1956) - Tersteeg (uncredited)
- The Ten Commandments (1956) - First High Priest (uncredited)
- Li'l Abner (1959) - Finsdale's Second Assistant (uncredited)
- Midnight Lace (1960) - Luggage Salesman (uncredited)
- The Notorious Landlady (1962) - Man (uncredited)
- The Three Stooges Go Around the World in a Daze (1963) - Kandu
- What a Way to Go! (1964) - Willard (uncredited)
- For Those Who Think Young (1964) - Faculty Member (uncredited)
- The Unsinkable Molly Brown (1964) - Roberts
- Goodbye Charlie (1964) - Butler
- One of Our Spies Is Missing (1966) - Steward
- Games (1967) - Winthrop
- Fitzwilly (1967) - Garland
- Bedknobs and Broomsticks (1971) - Portobello Vendor (uncredited)
