= Edmund Breon =

Scottish actor (1882–1953)

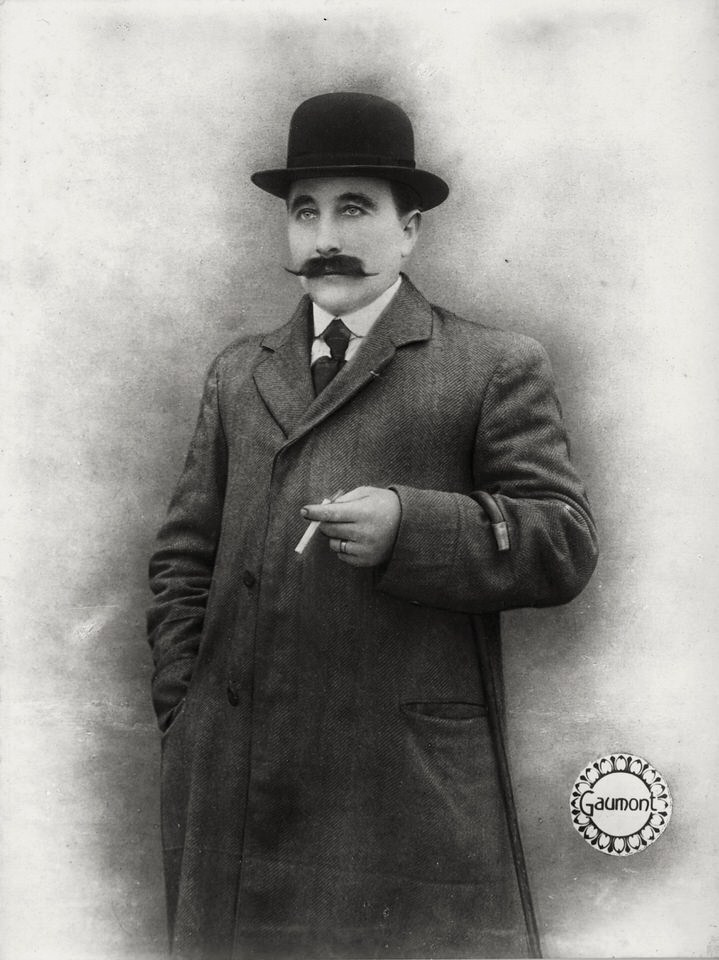
- Breon as Inspecteur Juve in Louis Feuillade's Fantômas (1913)
- Born: Iver Edmund de Breon MacLaverty; 12 December 1882; Hamilton, Scotland, UK
- Died: 24 June 1953 (aged 70); Cork, Ireland
- Occupation: Actor
- Years active: 1907–1951

Edmund Breon (born Iver Edmund de Breon MacLaverty; 12 December 1882 – 24 June 1953) was a Scottish film and stage actor. He appeared in more than 130 films between 1907 and 1952.

== Life and career ==
Born in Hamilton, South Lanarkshire, Breon began in John Hare's touring company and later played on the West End stage and in Glasgow, gaining prominence. According to his grandson, film editor, Breon "started out at the turn of the century doing silent pictures in France. Vampire movies", so it is reasonably certain that MacLaverty is indeed the actor who appeared under the name Edmond Bréon in many Gaumont films 1907–1922 including, most famously, playing the part of Inspector Juve for Louis Feuillade in the ground-breaking Fantômas series. He did also appear in a small part in the 1915–1916 Feuillade series Les vampires although this is not, as his grandson supposes, a horror film. He returned to Britain where he made the film A Little Bit of Fluff (1928) then went to Canada in 1929 and worked on the land. A year later he emigrated to the United States and gained his first big American film part in The Dawn Patrol (1930). Breon appeared in a mixture of British and American films over the following two decades. He also appeared on stage in the West End production of the comedy Spring Meeting in 1938.

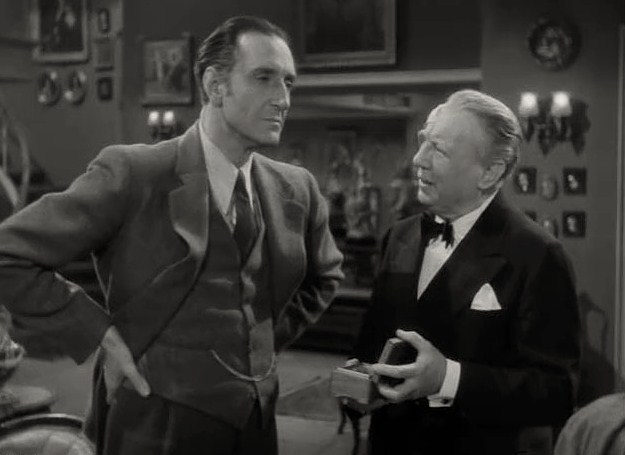
Basil Rathbone and Edmund Breon in Dressed to Kill (1946)

A 1949 newspaper article noted that Breon's "career has been interrupted by serious illness and an accident which kept him idle for two years."

His grandson also recalls that he played the role of Dr. Ambrose in Howard Hawks’ The Thing from Another World (1951).

Breon died in Cork, Ireland, on 24 June 1953.

== Selected filmography ==
- L'homme aimanté (1907)
- Fantômas - À l'ombre de la guillotine (1913) – Inspector Juve
- Fantômas (1913) – Inspector Juve
- Le mort qui tue (1913) – Inspector Juve
- Fantomas: The Mysterious Finger Print (1914) – Inspector Juve
- Le Faux Magistrat (1914) – Inspector Juve
- Severo Torelli (1914)
- La petite Andalouse (1915) – Don Benigno – Lawyer
- Les vampires (1915) – Satanas' Secretary
- L'énigme (1919)
- Barrabas (1919) – Lucius
- L'écuyère (1922)
- A Little Bit of Fluff (1928) – John Ayres
- The Dawn Patrol (1930) – Lieut. Phipps
- Raffles (1930) – Harry – Lord & Lady Melrose's Friend (uncredited)
- On Approval (1930) – Richard Wemys
- The Love Habit (1931) – Alphonse Dubois
- Uneasy Virtue (1931) – Harvey Townsend
- Born to Love (1931) – Tom Kent (uncredited)
- Chances (1931) – The General
- I Like Your Nerve (1931) – Clive Lattimer
- Women Who Play (1932) – Rachie Wells
- Wedding Rehearsal (1932) – Lord Fleet
- Leap Year (1932) – Jack Debrant
- No Funny Business (1933) – Edward
- Waltz Time (1933) – Judge Bauer
- Three Men in a Boat (1933) – George
- The Private Life of Don Juan (1934) – Cardona, the Playwright, as Playwrights Go
- The Scarlet Pimpernel (1934) – Col. Winterbottom
- Mister Cinders (1934) – Sir George Lancaster
- Royal Cavalcade (1935) – Minor Role (uncredited)
- Night Mail (1935) – Lord Ticehurst
- The Divine Spark (1935) – Rossini
- She Shall Have Music (1935) – Freddie Gates
- Love in Exile (1936) – Baron Zarroy
- Strangers on Honeymoon (1936) – Sir Gregory
- French Leave (1937) – Col. Root
- Keep Fit (1937) – Sir Augustus Marks
- Return of the Scarlet Pimpernel (1937) – Colonel Winterbottom
- Premiere (1938) – Morel
- Owd Bob (1938) – Lord Meredale
- A Yank at Oxford (1938) – Captain Wavertree
- Almost a Honeymoon (1938) – Aubrey Lovitt
- Dangerous Medicine (1938) – Totsie Mainwaring
- Crackerjack (1938) – Tony Davenport
- Luck of the Navy (1938) – Admiral Maybridge
- Many Tanks Mr. Atkins (1938) – Colonel
- The Outsider (1939) – Dr. Ladd
- Goodbye, Mr. Chips (1939) – Colonel Morgan
- It Happened to One Man (1940) – Adm. Drayton
- The Lodger (1944) – Manager (uncredited)
- Gaslight (1944) – General Huddleston
- The Hour Before the Dawn (1944) – Freddy Merritt
- The White Cliffs of Dover (1944) – Major Rupert Bancroft (uncredited)
- Casanova Brown (1944) – Mr. Drury
- Our Hearts Were Young and Gay (1944) – Guide (uncredited)
- An American Romance (1944) – (uncredited)
- The Woman in the Window (1944) – Dr. Michael Barkstane
- The Man in Half Moon Street (1945) – Sir Humphrey Brandon
- The Corn Is Green (1945) – Bit Part (uncredited)
- Saratoga Trunk (1945) – McIntyre (uncredited)
- Devotion (1946) – Sir John Thornton (uncredited)
- Dressed to Kill (1946) – Julian 'Stinky' Emery
- The Imperfect Lady (1947) – Lord Chief Justice
- Forever Amber (1947) – Lord Redmond
- Julia Misbehaves (1948) – Jamie (uncredited)
- Master of Lassie (1948) – Jamie Soutar
- Enchantment (1948) – Uncle Bunny
- Rope of Sand (1949) – Chairman
- Challenge to Lassie (1949) – Magistrate
- The Thing from Another World (1951) – Dr. Ambrose (uncredited)
- At Sword's Point (1952) – Queen's Chamberlain
