= Admirals All =

1935 British film by Victor Hanbury

- Percy Walsh and Wynne Gibson in the film
- Directed by: Victor Hanbury
- Written by: Ian Hay; Stephen King-Hall
- Based on: Admirals All by Ian Hay and Stephen King-Hal]
- Produced by: John Stafford
- Starring: Wynne Gibson; Gordon Harker; Anthony Bushell; George Curzon
- Music by: Jack Beaver
- Production company: John Stafford Productions
- Distributed by: RKO Pictures
- Release date: 13 June 1935
- Running time: 75 minutes
- Country: United Kingdom
- Language: English

Admirals All is a 1935 British comedy film directed by Victor Hanbury and starring Wynne Gibson, Gordon Harker, Anthony Bushell and George Curzon. It was written by Ian Hay and Stephen King-Hall based on their 1934 play of the same title.

== Plot ==
A temperamental female film star arrives in China to film her next movie, but becomes inadvertently involved with local bandits.

== Cast ==
- Wynne Gibson as Gloria Gunn
- Gordon Harker as Petty Officer Dingle
- Anthony Bushell as Flag Lieutenant Steve Langham
- George Curzon as Pang Hi
- Joan White as Prudence Stallybrass
- Henry Hewitt as Flag Captain Knox
- Percy Walsh as Admiral Westerham
- Wilfrid Hyde-White as Mr Stallybrass
- Gwyneth Lloyd as Jean Stallybrass
- Ben Welden as Adolph Klotz

== Reception ==
The Monthly Film Bulletin wrote: "The theme is slight, but serves as a thread for humorous events. ... [Gordon Harker's] lugubrious cockneyisms, his mispronunciation and his face keep one in roars of laughter. Hyde White as Stallybrass is also very funny in a quiet way. ... Very good entertainment."

== See also ==
- O.H.M.S.
