= Hundred to One =

1933 film

- Directed by: Walter West
- Produced by: Harry Cohen; Julius Hagen
- Starring: Arthur Sinclair; Dodo Watts; Derek Williams
- Production company: Julius Hagen Productions
- Distributed by: Fox Film Company
- Release date: 1933
- Running time: 45 minutes
- Country: United Kingdom
- Language: English

Hundred to One is a 1933 British sports film directed by Walter West and starring Arthur Sinclair, Dodo Watts and Derek Williams. It was made at Wembley Studios.

== Cast ==
- Arthur Sinclair as Patrick Flynn
- Dodo Watts as Molly Flynn
- Derek Williams as Bob Dent
- David Nichol as Birchington
- Edmund Hampton as Luggett

== Bibliography ==
- Chibnall, Steve. Quota Quickies: The British of the British 'B' Film. British Film Institute, 2007.
- Low, Rachael. Filmmaking in 1930s Britain. George Allen & Unwin, 1985.
- Wood, Linda. British Films, 1927-1939. British Film Institute, 1986.
