= Sing Along with Me =

1952 film by Peter Graham Scott

- Theatrical release poster
- Directed by: Peter Graham Scott
- Written by: Dennis Vance; Peter Graham Scott
- Produced by: John Croydon
- Starring: Donald Peers; Dodo Watts
- Cinematography: Gerald Gibbs
- Edited by: Eric Hodges
- Music by: Denis Moonan
- Production company: Harold Huth Productions
- Distributed by: British Lion Films
- Release date: February 1952
- Running time: 78 minutes
- Country: United Kingdom
- Language: English

Sing Along with Me is a 1952 British second feature ('B') musical film directed by Peter Graham Scott and starring Donald Peers, Dodo Watts and Dennis Vance. It was written by Dennis Vance and Scott, and concerns a grocer who wins a songwriting competition and is signed to a lucrative contract.

== Plot ==
David Parry is a grocer in a small Welsh village and hopes to win £1000 in a songwriting contest, for the local rugby field. He wins, gets a contract with a music publishing company, and because his love Gwynneth Evans refuses to marry him, moves to a luxury flat in London to start a new life as a professional singwriter. But, so far from his beloved surroundings, he cannot write well. Then a crooked publisher tries to steal his first new song. He returns to the village and marries Gwynneth.

== Cast ==
- Donald Peers as David Parry
- Dodo Watts as Gwynneth Evans
- Dennis Vance as Harry Humphries
- Jill Clifford as Shelia
- Mercy Haystead as Gloria
- Cyril Chamberlain as Jack Bates
- Humphrey Morton as Syd Maxton
- George Curzon as Mr Palmere
- Leonard Morris as Uncle Ebeneezer

== Songs ==
Songe include "Take My Heart", "If You Smile at the Sun", "Hoop Diddle-i-do-ra-li-ay", "Down at the Old Village Hall" and "I Left My Heart in a Valley in Wales".

== Reception ==
The Monthly Film Bulletin wrote: "Musical with a trivial plot, pleasant but unmemorable songs and, as with other British productions of this type, an unconvincing and embarrassing romantic interest. Donald Peers makes his first screen appearance; his greatest quality seems to be the establishing: of an air of intimacy with his audience, which is difficult in the cinema but can be done on television; the whole production, in truth, would be better suited to that medium."

Kine Weekly wrote: "The picture presents Donald Peers with a simple yet effective vehicle for his screen debut, and he returns the compliment by easily adapting his flawless stage, radio and TV technique to the even more exacting demands of the 'flicks.' His friendly approach offsets his years, close-ups hold no terror for him, and, like the experienced trouper he is, he sees that all the ditties have rousing choruses."

Picture Show wrote: "With its artless story and happy atmosphere, and Donald Peers giving a likeable and natural performance as well as a generous number of songs, this story of a little Welsh grocer who wins fame and fortune as a songwriter but yearns for the lost happiness of his simple life is told with appeal and humour. It's a 'must' for all Donald Peers admirers."
