= James Harcourt =

English actor (1873–1951)

James Harcourt in Kate Plus Ten (1938)

James Harcourt (born Joseph Hudson; 20 April 1873 – 18 February 1951) was an English character actor.

Harcourt was born in Headingley, Leeds, West Riding of Yorkshire. He started work as a cabinet maker, and drifted into amateur dramatics. He appeared as a stage actor first in 1903 and worked with the Liverpool Repertory Company from 1919 to 1931, and was with the Old Vic in the mid 1940s.

In 1947, Harcourt appeared in the original West End production of the popular musical Bless the Bride, directed by Wendy Toye.

He married the actress Dora Keith in 1912, and was the father of camera operator and cinematographer David Harcourt and continuity girl Josephine Harcourt.

He died in Taplow, Buckinghamshire on 18 February 1951 aged 77.

== Filmography ==
Year	Title	Role	Notes
1931	Hobson's Choice	Hobson	
1933	Paris Plane		
1933	Song of the Plough	Doctor	
1934	The Old Curiosity Shop	the Single Gentleman	
1935	Look Up and Laugh	Mr. Pearson	Uncredited
1936	All at Sea	Mr. Humphrey	
1936	The Avenging Hand	Sam Hupp	Uncredited
1936	Laburnum Grove	Joe Fletten	
1936	Seven Sinners	Vicar (Father Blanchard)	
1936	Wings Over Africa	Wilkins	
1936	Men Are Not Gods	Porter	Uncredited
1937	Return of a Stranger	Johnson	
1938	Kate Plus Ten	Bank Manager	
1938	Penny Paradise	Amos Cook	
1938	You're the Doctor	William Firmstone	
1938	Follow Your Star	Mr. Tee	
1939	I Met a Murderer	Hay Wagon Driver	
1940	The Stars Look Down	Will	
1940	Night Train to Munich	Axel Bomasch	
1940	The House of the Arrow	Boris Raviart	
1941	The Farmer's Wife	Valiant Dunnybrigg	
1941	You Will Remember	Judge	Uncredited
1941	Love on the Dole	Old Man Who Has His Dole Stopped	Uncredited
1941	This England		
1942	Atlantic Ferry	Minor role	Uncredited
1942	Penn of Pennsylvania	Fox	
1942	Hard Steel	Jim Calver	
1942	The Young Mr. Pitt	Bellamy	Uncredited
1945	He Snoops to Conquer	Councilor Hopkins	
1945	Johnny Frenchman	Joe Pender	
1946	The Captive Heart	Doctor	
1946	I See a Dark Stranger	Grandfather	
1947	The Grand Escapade	Old Traveller	
1947	Meet Me at Dawn	Henri, the butler	
1949	Obsession	Aitkin (butler)	(final film role)
