= John Stafford (producer) =

British film producer and director (1893–1967)

John Stafford (1893–1967) was a British film producer and director.

== Selected filmography ==
=== Producer ===
- Where Is This Lady? (1932)
- No Funny Business (1933)
- There Goes Susie (1934)
- Spring in the Air (1934)
- Admirals All (1935)
- The Crouching Beast (1935)
- Ball at Savoy (1936)
- Beloved Imposter (1936)
- Wings Over Africa (1936)
- The Avenging Hand (1936)
- Second Bureau (1936)
- Wake Up Famous (1937)
- The Wife of General Ling (1937)
- Return of a Stranger (1937)
- Tomorrow We Live (1943)
- Candlelight in Algeria (1944)
- Teheran (1946)
- The Golden Madonna (1949)
- Call of the Blood (1949)
- The Woman with No Name (1950)
- The Planter's Wife (1952)
- The Stranger's Hand (1954))
- Loser Takes All (1956)
- Across the Bridge (1957)

=== Director ===
- The Inseparables (1929)
- Dick Turpin (1933)

=== Screenwriter ===
- The Beggar Student (1931)
