= S.O.S. Sahara =

- Directed by: Jacques de Baroncelli
- Written by: Jacques Constant; Michel Duran; Jean Martet
- Produced by: Dietrich von Theobald; Raoul Ploquin; W. Schmidt
- Starring: Charles Vanel; Jean-Pierre Aumont; Marta Labarr; Raymond Cordy
- Cinematography: Günther Rittau
- Music by: Lothar Brühne
- Production company: ACE
- Distributed by: ACE, UFA
- Release date: 17 August 1938
- Country: Germany
- Language: French

S.O.S. Sahara is a 1938 German drama film directed by Jacques de Baroncelli and starring Charles Vanel, Jean-Pierre Aumont and Marta Labarr. The film was made in the French language, produced by the French subsidiary of the German studio UFA. It was shot on location in Algeria. The screenplay was based on a play Men Without a Past by Jean Martet. Martet's credit was removed from the film during the Nazi occupation of France. He later brought a court case against UFA to re-establish his rights to the film.

It was remade in 1962 as Station Six-Sahara.

== Cast ==
- Charles Vanel as Loup
- Jean-Pierre Aumont as Paul Moutier
- Marta Labarr as Hélène Muriel
- Raymond Cordy as Charles
- Paul Azaïs as Bobby
- Andrée Lindia as Dolly
- Nilda Duplessy as L'amie
- René Dary as Delini
- Georges Malkine as Ivan
- Georges Lannes as Jacquard
- Bill Bocket as Le policier
- Hugues Wanner as L'employé

== Bibliography ==
- Bergfelder, Tim. International Adventures: German Popular Cinema and European Co-productions in the 1960s. Berghahn Books, 2005.
- Orlando, Valerie. Screening Morocco: Contemporary Depictions in Film of a Changing Society. Ohio University Press, 2011.
