= Charles Oliver (actor) =

British actor (1907–1983)

Charles Arthur Richardson Oliver (born Charles Arthur Sherlock Oliver; 21 June 1907, in Buttevant, County Cork, Ireland – 29 March 1983, in Tunbridge Wells, Kent, England) was an Irish-born British film actor. He married on 4 June 1938 the actress (Margaret) Noel Hood. They had two children: Nina (1943) and William (1947). He appeared in the Will Hay film Ask a Policeman as the local squire who oversees a smuggling empire.

== Television ==
- The Parnell Commission (18 Jul 1939) – Captain O'Shea
- Three in a Bar (21 Aug 1939) – Beddall

== Selected filmography ==
- Beloved Imposter (1936) as Pierre
- The Avenging Hand (1936) as Toni Visetti
- Wings Over Africa (1936) as Collins
- Second Bureau (1936) as Paul Benoit
- Midnight at Madame Tussaud's (1936) as Harry Newton
- Fifty-Shilling Boxer (1937) as Jim Pollett
- The Green Cockatoo (1937) as Terrell, Gang Boss
- If I Were Boss (1938) as Owen Reeves
- The Drum (1938) as Rajab
- The Lady Vanishes (1938) as The Officer
- Hey! Hey! USA (1938) as Curly (uncredited)
- Sexton Blake and the Hooded Terror (1938) as Max Fleming
- Mountains O'Mourne (1938) as Errol Finnegan
- Life of St. Paul (1938) as Elder
- Ask a Policeman (1939) as The Squire
- The Saint in London (1939) as Dr. Jim, Templar's Friend (uncredited)
- This Man in Paris (1939) as Gaston
- Band Waggon (1940) as Saboteur (uncredited)
- Night Train to Munich (1940) as SS Officer at Concentration Camp (uncredited)
- Under Your Hat (1940) as Carl
- Three Silent Men (1940) as Johnson
- Inspector Hornleigh Goes to It (1941) as Dr. Wilkinson
- Crook's Tour (1941) as Sheik (final film role)
