= Teheran (1946 film) =

1946 British-Italian thriller film

- British theatrical poster
- Directed by: William Freshman; Giacomo Gentilomo
- Written by: Ákos Tolnay; William Freshman; Basil Mason; A.R. Rawlinson
- Produced by: John Stafford; Ákos Tolnay
- Starring: Derek Farr; Marta Labarr
- Cinematography: Ubaldo Arata (as U. Arata)
- Edited by: Renzo Lucidi
- Music by: Enzo Masetti
- Distributed by: General Film Distributors (UK)
- Release dates: 3 October 1946 (Italy); 1947 (UK)
- Running time: 86 minutes
- Countries: United Kingdom; Italy
- Language: English
- Budget: £150,000

Teheran (also known as The Plot to Kill Roosevelt, Conspiracy in Teheran and Appointment in Persia) is a 1946 British-Italian thriller film co-directed by Giacomo Gentilomo and William Freshman. and starring Derek Farr, Marta Labarr, Manning Whiley and Pamela Stirling. A British intelligence officer, discovers a plot to assassinate the President of the United States Franklin D. Roosevelt at the Tehran Conference during the Second World War.

It was shot at the Scalera Studios in Rome.

== Plot ==
In 1943, Churchill, Stalin and Roosevelt meet at the Tehran Conference to agree plans for the Allied invasion of Europe. Whilst attempting to trace ballerina Natalie Trubetzin, whom he met before the outbreak of war, British journalist Pemberton Grant uncovers a deadly conspiracy. The plot, led by Paul Sherek, involves international arms dealers, who can't afford to, and do not wish to have peace declared, and plan to blow up President Roosevelt during his visit.

== Partial cast ==
- Derek Farr as Pemberton Grant
- Marta Labarr as Natalie Trubetzin
- Manning Whiley as Paul Sherek
- Pamela Stirling as Haali
- Philip Ridgeway as Mr Razed
- John Warwick as Maor "Mack" MacIntyre
- John Slater as Maor Sergei Soviesky
- MacDonald Parke as Major Wellman

== Critical reception ==
The Monthly Film Bulletin wrote: "The story, told by flash-backs, is disjointed, melodramatic with many loose ends, but has its exciting moments. Marta Labarr is wooden and scarcely attractive as the ballet dancer and the rest of the cast seem unable to believe in the unbelievable plot."

Picturegoer wrote: "The characters are stock, the Russian, British and American intelligence services are treated with scant respect. The main point in an otherwise undistinguished production is the acting of Manning Whiley as Paul Sherak."

Picture Show wrote: "Competently acted, conventionally directed. Authentic settings."

The Radio Times called the film a "shambolic British thriller."

TV Guide wrote, "Whiley's performance alone provides some semblance of acting, and the technical end is almost totally incompetent."

Allmovie wrote, "Even though the audience knows the outcome, there's thrills aplenty in The Plot to Kill Roosevelt."

In British Sound Films: The Studio Years 1928–1959 David Quinlan rated the film as "mediocre", writing: "Second-rate pot-boiler."

== See also ==
- Operation Long Jump
