= Marta Labarr =

American actress (1912–1999)

- Born: Martha Eugénie Claquin; 4 June 1912; New York City, United States
- Died: 30 June 1999 (aged 87); Paris, France
- Other name: Martha Labarr
- Occupations: Actress, singer
- Years active: 1936–1946 (film)

Marta Labarr (born Martha Eugénie Claquin; 4 June 1912 – 30 June 1999) was a French-American singer and actress who appeared in 11 British and French films, usually as a leading lady. Her final film was the 1946 thriller Tehran, playing opposite Derek Farr. She also appeared on the London stage in musicals. She later worked as a language coach, teaching Gina Lollobrigida amongst others. She is buried in Hautefort (France).

Labarr was born in New York City to French parents, Charles and Élizabeth Claquin, and had an older sister, Andrée Claquin. Her father was a salesman.

== Selected filmography ==
- Ball at Savoy (1936)
- Second Bureau (1936)
- The Singing Cop (1938)
- Mollenard (1938)
- Break the News (1938)
- S.O.S. Sahara (1938)
- Traitor Spy (1939)
- Meet Maxwell Archer (1940)
- It Happened to One Man (1940)
- Teheran (1946)

== Bibliography ==
- Canales, Luis. Imperial Gina: The Very Unauthorized Biography of Gina Lollobrigida. Branden Books, 1990.
- Gänzl, Kurt. The British Musical Theatre: 1915–1984. MacMillan Press, 1986.
- Murphy, Robert & Brown, Geoff & Burton, Alan. Directors in British and Irish Cinema: A Reference Companion. BFI, 2006.
