= It Happened to One Man =

1940 film directed by Paul L. Stein

- Directed by: Paul L. Stein
- Screenplay by: Paul Merzbach; Nina Jarcis
- Based on: the play, It Happened to One Man by John Hastings Turner and Roland Pertwee
- Produced by: Victor Hanbury
- Starring: Wilfrid Lawson; Nora Swinburne; Marta Labarr
- Cinematography: Walter J. Harvey
- Production company: British Eagle Productions
- Distributed by: RKO Radio Pictures
- Release dates: 12 October 1940: February 22, 1941 (US)
- Running time: 81 minutes
- Country: United Kingdom
- Language: English

It Happened to One Man (also known as Gentleman of Venture) is a 1940 British drama film directed by Paul L. Stein and starring Wilfrid Lawson, Nora Swinburne and Marta Labarr. The screenplay was by Paul Merzbach and Nina Jarcis, based on the play of the same name by John Hastings Turner and Roland Pertwee. Produced by Victor Hanbury's British Eagle Productions, it was distributed in the United States by RKO Pictures, and premiered in New York City at the Little Carnegie Playhouse on 22 February 1941.

== Cast ==
- Wilfrid Lawson as Felton Quair
- Nora Swinburne as Alice Quair
- Marta Labarr as Rita
- Ivan Brandt as Leonard Drayton
- Reginald Tate as Ackroyd
- Brian Worth as Jack Quair
- Edmund Breon as Adm. Drayton
- Patricia Roc as Betty Quair
- Thorley Walters as Ronnie
- Athole Stewart as Lord Kenley
- Ruth Maitland as Lady Rapscombe
- Ian Fleming as Sir Francis Hay

== Reception ==
The Monthly Film Bulletin wrote: "This rather involved story covers a good deal of ground, and its development depends considerably on the long arm of coincidence. The moral tone is not high, and accepted standards of conduct go by the board. It is, nevertheless, holding and interesting, effectively directed and admirably acted."
