= Pit of Darkness =

1961 British film by Lance Comfort

- Directed by: Lance Comfort
- Written by: Lance Comfort
- Based on: novel To Dusty Death by Hugh McCutcheon
- Produced by: Lance Comfort
- Starring: William Franklyn; Moira Redmond
- Cinematography: Basil Emmott
- Edited by: John Trumper
- Music by: Martin Slavin
- Production company: Butcher's Film Distributors Ltd
- Distributed by: The Rank Organisation
- Release date: October 1961
- Running time: 80 minutes
- Country: United Kingdom
- Language: English

Pit of Darkness is a 1961 British thriller second feature ('B') film, directed and written by Lance Comfort and starring William Franklyn and Moira Redmond. It was based on the 1960 novel To Dusty Death by Hugh McCutcheon.The film is an amnesia thriller dealing with a man's attempts to piece together a sequence of strange events in which he seems to have been involved during the time of which he has no memory,

== Plot ==
Safe-designer Richard Logan awakens late one evening on a patch of suburban waste ground. He has no idea how he got there. He returns home to wife Julie to apologise for being late from work. He is astonished to learn that he has been missing not for a few hours, but for three weeks. Furthermore, a troubling series of events has occurred during his absence. A supposedly foolproof safe which he installed in a customer's home has been cracked open with apparent ease. Items taken include cash and a world-famous diamond from East Africa. Alarmed by Richard's disappearance, Julie had hired a private detective to find him, but the detective was later found dead. Richard must now find a way to penetrate the amnesia that prevents him from recalling recent events.

After investigating, he becomes aware that he is trailed by a group of mysterious men who patronize a local nightclub called the Blue Baboon, which he and Julie decide to visit one evening. While there, in his confused mental state, Richard is plagued by random and trivial occurrences – a snatch of a popular song or a conversational nuance – which inexplicably strike a chord within him. He experiences mental flashbacks so fleeting they are over as quickly as they begin. These and other events lead him to wonder if he may have been involved in criminal activity with some of the nightclub's regulars. Later, Richard is lured to a cottage in the countryside. He enters and hears the tick-tick-ticking of a bomb about to go off. He runs from the house, a split-second ahead of the shock waves that result from the explosion. It is this episode that appears finally to jolt his memory, and he believes he has discovered what has transpired during the past three weeks.

== Cast ==
- William Franklyn as Richard Logan
- Moira Redmond as Julie Logan
- Leonard Sachs as Clifton Conrad
- Bruno Barnabe as Bruno
- Nigel Green as Jonathan
- Bruce Beeby as Peter Mayhew
- Anthony Booth as Ted Melis
- Nanette Newman as Mary
- Humphrey Lestocq as Bill Underwood
- Jacqueline Jones as Mavis
- Michael Balfour as Fisher
- Ronnie Hall as the singer

== Production ==
The film was shot at Twickenham Studios in June 1961.

== Release ==
The film was paired with What a Whopper (1961) for its release in the United Kingdom. Kinematograph Weekly said this "definitely scored" at the box office.

== Critical reception ==
The Monthly Film Bulletin wrote: "Complex, fanciful plot made plausible by effective writing and direction. The pace is brisk, there are some spirited fisticuffs, and there is the personality of William Franklyn – unbeatable in suggesting solid virtues behind a rakish, smooth exterior. Sets, editing, sound, all competent."

Kinematograph Weekly called it "an intriguing crime melodrama with compelling marital overtones."
