= The Crouching Beast =

1935 British film by Victor Hanbury

- Directed by: Victor Hanbury
- Written by: L. du Garde Peach
- Based on: The Crouching Beast by Valentine Williams
- Produced by: John Stafford
- Starring: Fritz Kortner; Wynne Gibson; Richard Bird
- Cinematography: James Wilson
- Edited by: David Lean
- Music by: Jack Beaver
- Production company: John Stafford Productions
- Distributed by: RKO Pictures
- Release dates: 29 August 1935 (London); 6 January 1936 (UK)
- Running time: 78 minutes
- Country: United Kingdom
- Language: English

The Crouching Beast is a 1935 British war thriller film directed by Victor Hanbury and starring Fritz Kortner, Wynne Gibson and Richard Bird. It was written by L. du Garde Peach based on the 1928 novel The Crouching Beast by Valentine Williams. The film was distributed by the Hollywood studio RKO Pictures in order to fulfil its British quota. However it was considerably more expensive than many of the quota quickies produced by American companies during the era.

== Plot ==
In 1915 during the First World War, a British secret agent is killed while stealing secret Turkish plans for the Gallipoli Campaign. Before his death, the British agent manages to pass his information to an American journalist. Travelling to Constantinople, she manages to make contact with the British network, but the ruthless head of Turkish intelligence is close on her trail.

== Cast ==
- Fritz Kortner as Ahmed Bey
- Wynne Gibson as Gail Dunbar
- Richard Bird as Nigel Druce
- Andrews Engelmann as Prince Dmitri
- Isabel Jeans as The Pellegrini
- Fred Conyngham as Rudi von Linz
- Peter Gawthorne as Kadir Pasha
- Ian Fleming as Major Abbott
- Marjorie Mars as Ottillie

== Production ==
The films was shot at Welwyn Studios with sets designed by the art director Duncan Sutherland.

== Reception ==
The Monthly Film Bulletin wrote: "A film which misses through redundant episodes, poor dialogue, and indifferent acting, the pace and excitement which it might have had. ... Nobody minds a familiar story if it is told effectively and with some distinction; here the fine acting and appearance of Fritz Kortner is negatived by the very English Turks, the very English young German officer, and the cardboard settings of cafe´ and street life. Wynne Gibson is not well cast for the snappy journalist, ready for adventure and risk. It is fair entertainment and would have been better without the occasional attempts at humour."

Picture Show wrote: "The menacing figure of 'Clubfoot' loses much of his menace in this somewhat highly coloured melodrama, which shows him completely outwitted by American girl and an Englishman. ... Story suffers from its direction, which does not make most of situations and thrills."
