= Golden Madonna =

- Italian theatrical poster
- Directed by: Luigi Carpentieri; Ladislao Vajda
- Written by: Dudley Leslie; Aimée Stuart
- Screenplay by: Ákos Tolnay
- Story by: Dorothy Hope
- Produced by: Saverio D'Amico; John Stafford
- Starring: Phyllis Calvert; Tullio Carminati; Michael Rennie
- Cinematography: Anchise Brizzi; Otello Martelli
- Edited by: Carmen Belaieff
- Music by: Fernando Ludovico Lunghi
- Production companies: Pendennis Productions; Produttore Films Internazionali
- Distributed by: Warner Bros. Pictures
- Release dates: 1949 (Italy); April 1949 (UK); 15 September 1949 (US)
- Running time: 88 minutes
- Countries: Italy; United Kingdom
- Languages: Italian; English

Golden Madonna (Italian: La madonnina d'oro) is a 1949 British-Italian drama film directed by Luigi Carpentieri and Ladislao Vajda and starring Phyllis Calvert, Tullio Carminati and Michael Rennie. It was written by Dudley Leslie, Aimée Stuart and Ákos Tolnay, based on a story by Dorothy Hope.

Filmed on location, a group of original negatives and contact prints taken by photographer Francis Goodman are in the possession of London's National Portrait Gallery.

It was considered a lost film and was on the BFI 75 Most Wanted list, until a copy was loaned to the British Film Institute by Cohen Media.

== Plot ==
Patricia, a young British woman inherits an estate in rural Italy, and gives up her job as a schoolteacher. Soon after she arrives she offends the village where she now plans to live by accidentally throwing away a sacred painting of the Madonna which they consider to be lucky and a protector of the community. To redeem herself she goes out in search of the painting with the assistance of a British ex-army Captain, hoping to return in to the village.

A romance begins between her and the Captain, but a gang of street urchins steal his money. The Captain has painted over the Madonna with his own painting of The Laughing Cavalier before it disappeared.

In Naples she is first cheated by Johnny Lester, a British spiv, and his tiny Italian gangster sidekick, but later receives his help to steal back the painting from a wealthy collector, Julian Migone, who has taken the Madonna to his cliff-top villa on Capri.

Patricia, pretending to be a rich countess, travels alone to Capri by boat but the moneyless Captain is given a ticket by one of the young Naples street urchins. She plays along with Migone's attempt to seduce her in order to get the painting back.

She and the Captain are stopped by police when trying to return on the boat, and their luggage is searched, but the painting has disappeared. It has been stolen by Johnny who successfully gets it back to the mainland.

Patricia returns the painting to the church where it is received with much ceremony.

== Cast ==
- Phyllis Calvert as Patricia Chandler
- Tullio Carminati as Signor Migone
- Michael Rennie as Mike Christie, the Captain
- David Greene as Johnny Lester
- Aldo Silvani as Don Vincenzo
- Pippo Bonucci as Pippo
- Francesca Biondi as Maria
- Franco Coop as Esposito
- Claudio Ermelli as Antonio

== Production ==
The film's sets were designed by the art director Guido Fiorini.

== Reception ==
The Monthly Film Bulletin wrote: "This curiously slow-moving, indecisive, amateurish film tries to bring to the British screen something of the life and colour of the Italian cinema. The whole attempt is slightly synthetic, but the film does succeed in giving a tourist's eye view of Italy against attractively photographed backgrounds. With a better, gayer script, and more sensitive playing by the English leads, it could have been enchanting. As it is, the energetic Italian cast do their best, but the screen temperature falls noticeably whenever the English pair appear; they, too, have very much the worst of the script."

Kine Weekly wrote: "Phyllis Calvert is a beautiful but incredibly dumb Patricia, and Michael Rennie is much too pleased with himself as Mike. The rest are nothing to shout about, either. ... The picture, occasionaily reminiscent of Hue and Cry, is indifferently handled technically, as well as weak from the story viewpoint."

Picturegoer wrote: "This comedy makes heavy going of its story ... The plot has ideas, but its scripting is not very imaginative. Phyllis Calvert has been turned into a young woman with less allure than you can readily believe. Michael Rennie is hearty as the ex-officer, and David Green manages to have infuse some sense of character into the spiv stranded in Italy."

Picture Show wrote: "It shows us many Italian beauty spots but the story and dialogue are too silly to be believed."
