= Ákos Tolnay =

Hungarian screenwriter, actor and journalist (1903–1981)

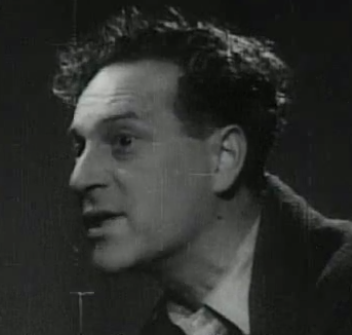
- Ákos Tolnay in 1945.
- Born: 1903; Szeged, Austro-Hungarian Empire
- Died: 7 February 1981 (aged 77–78); Rome, Italy
- Occupations: Writer, Producer, Actor
- Years active: 1921-1959 (film)

Ákos Tolnay (1903–1981) was a Hungarian screenwriter active mainly in Italian cinema, having previously worked in Britain. He also appeared in Roberto Rossellini's 1945 neorealist film Rome, Open City.

== Selected filmography ==
- The Scandal (1934)
- Temptation (1934)
- Drake of England (1935)
- The Avenging Hand (1936)
- Ball at Savoy (1936)
- Second Bureau (1936)
- Wings Over Africa (1936)
- Elephant Boy (1937)
- Return of a Stranger (1937)
- Thunder in the City (1937)
- The Wife of General Ling (1937)
- The White Slave (1939)
- Deputy Eusèbe (1939)
- The Brambilla Family Go on Holiday (1941)
- Caravaggio, il pittore maledetto (1941)
- Two Hearts Among the Beasts (1943)
- Tehran (1946)
- Call of the Blood (1948)
- Golden Madonna (1949)
- Voice of Silence (1953)
- A Parisian in Rome (1954)
- The Open Door (1957)
- The White Warrior (1959)

== Bibliography ==
- Christopher Wagstaff. Italian Neorealist Cinema: An Aesthetic Approach. University of Toronto Press, 2007.
