= Second Bureau (1936 film) =

- Anthony Eustrel and Marta Labarr in a still from the film
- Directed by: Victor Hanbury
- Written by: Charles Robert-Dumas (novel); Reginald Long; Ákos Tolnay
- Produced by: John Stafford
- Starring: Marta Labarr; Charles Oliver; Arthur Wontner; Meinhart Maur
- Cinematography: James Wilson
- Edited by: Ralph Thomas
- Music by: Jack Beaver
- Production company: John Stafford Productions
- Distributed by: RKO Pictures
- Release date: December 1936
- Running time: 75 minutes
- Country: United Kingdom
- Language: English

Second Bureau is a 1936 British spy romance film directed by Victor Hanbury and starring Marta Labarr, Charles Oliver and Arthur Wontner. It was made at Shepperton Studios and based on the 1934 novel Second Bureau by Charles Robert-Dumas. It was a remake of a 1935 French film of the same name.

The film's title refers to the French military intelligence outfit Deuxième Bureau.

== Plot ==
A French spy, Captain Paul Benoit, manages to steal some German secrets. The Germans send Erna Fielder, an agent of their own, after him, but the two spies end up falling in love.

== Cast ==
- Marta Labarr as Erna Fielder
- Charles Oliver as Paul Benoit
- Arthur Wontner as Col. Gueraud
- Meinhart Maur as Gen. von Raugwitz
- Fred Groves as Sgt. Colleret
- Joan White as Dorothy Muller
- Anthony Eustrel as Lt. von Stranmer
- G. H. Mulcaster as Yvanne Brosilow
- Leo de Pokorny as Dr. Weygelmann
- Fewlass Llewellyn as Director of Schaffingen
- Bruno Barnabe as Commissaire of Police

== Reception ==
The Monthly Film Bulletin wrote: "The photography is very clear, and there are some excellent atmospheric shots of a small German frontier-town. The grim opening sequence is also very well conceived, with naturalistic noises considerably enhancing the effect. The continuity at the beginning, however, is distinctly confused, and for a short while there is even some difficulty in determining which of the characters is which, particularly as we know that at any given moment they may be endeavouring to disguise their identities. ... The sequence of events, as one might expect in this type of story, is not always outstandingly logical; and at times one feels that the treatment might with advantage have been more circumstantial. The pace now and then seems definitely too slow for the subject-matter."

Kine Weekly wrote: "At first ragged continuity and the jumbled accents of the English and continental players are a little disturbing, but once the love interest is clearly established the story tightens its hold and from thence on the play never ceases to grip. Great pains have been taken to cultivate convincing atmosphere, all the exteriors are obviously the real thing, and the good technical work is augmented by a carefully graduated and fascinating performance by Marta Labarr in the lead. The polish of the best continental production is very much in evidence, and allied to this is the power and popularity of the eternal espionage theme. The film is a sound job of work, one calculated to appeal strongly to the masses and feminine audiences."
