= Dick Turpin (1933 film) =

1933 British film by Victor Hanbury

- Directed by: Victor Hanbury; John Stafford
- Written by: Harrison Ainsworth (novel); Boyd Cable; Dorothy Hope; Victor Kendall
- Produced by: Clyde Cook
- Starring: Victor McLaglen; Jane Carr; Frank Vosper
- Cinematography: Walter Blakeley; Desmond Dickinson
- Edited by: Ernest Aldridge; Dallas Bower
- Music by: Roy Douglas
- Production company: Stoll Pictures
- Distributed by: Gaumont British Distributors
- Release date: April 1, 1934
- Running time: 79 minutes
- Country: United Kingdom
- Language: English
- Budget: $300,000

Dick Turpin is a 1933 British historical drama film directed by Victor Hanbury and John Stafford. It starred Victor McLaglen, Jane Carr, Frank Vosper, James Finlayson and Cecil Humphreys. The film depicts the adventures of the eighteenth century highwayman Dick Turpin and his legendary ride to York. It was based on a historical novel by Harrison Ainsworth.

It was made at Cricklewood Studios with sets designed by the art director Wilfred Arnold. It was the last film made by Stoll Pictures which had once been the dominant producer in Britain during the silent era.

== Cast ==
- Victor McLaglen as Dick Turpin
- Jane Carr as Eleanor Mowbray
- Frank Vosper as Tom King
- James Finlayson as Jeremy
- Cecil Humphreys as Sir Luke Rookwood
- Gillian Lind as Nan
- Gibb McLaughlin as Governor of Newgate
- Alexander Field as Weazel Jones
- Roy Findlay as Dan Smollet
- Helen Ferrers as Lady Rookwood
- Lewis Gilbert as Jem

== Production ==
Filming was difficult. Gaumont British were called in to invest an additional $100,000.

== Bibliography ==
- Low, Rachael. Filmmaking in 1930s Britain. George Allen & Unwin, 1985.
- Wood, Linda. British Films, 1927-1939. British Film Institute, 1986.
