= No Funny Business =

- Theatrical release poster
- Directed by: Victor Hanbury; John Stafford
- Written by: Victor Hanbury; Frank Vosper
- Based on: a story by Dorothy Hope
- Produced by: John Stafford
- Starring: Laurence Olivier; Gertrude Lawrence; Jill Esmond
- Cinematography: Walter Blakeley
- Edited by: Edward B. Jarvis; Elmer J. McGovern
- Music by: Noel Gay
- Production company: John Stafford Productions
- Distributed by: United Artists (UK)
- Release dates: 19 June 1933 (London, England)
- Running time: 76 minutes
- Country: United Kingdom
- Language: English

No Funny Business is a 1933 British comedy film directed by Victor Hanbury and starring Laurence Olivier, Gertrude Lawrence, Jill Esmond and Edmund Breon. It was written by Hanbury and Frank Vosper based on a story by Dorothy Hope.

The film is a comedy of errors set in a divorce case.

== Cast ==
- Gertrude Lawrence as Yvonne
- Laurence Olivier as Clive Dering
- Jill Esmond as Anne
- Edmund Breon as Edward
- Gibb McLaughlin as Florey
- Muriel Aked as Mrs Fothergill

== Production ==
It was made at Ealing Studios with sets designed by the art director Duncan Sutherland.

Olivier had returned to Britain after his career, following an initial move to Hollywood, had faltered.

== Reception ==
Picturegoer wrote: "The story is complicated and slow, and the humour generally forced; so that one relies almost solely on the famous stage star for entertainment, There are touches of sex and sophistication which help to liven matters up, and the technical qualities generally are good."

The Monthly Film Bulletin wrote in 1951: "Originally seen in 1933, this comedy, with its stagey plot and sets, slowly developed situations, and badly dated dialogue, has a certain fascination simply as a period piece. Gertrude Lawrence conveys a good deal of vitality and assurance, although playing in a manner long outmoded; Laurence Olivier, however, looks somewhat unhappy as the conventional juvenile lead of the period."

== Bibliography ==
- Munn, Michael. Lord Larry: The Secret Life of Laurence Olivier. Robson Books, 2007.
