= Traitor Spy =

1939 film by Walter Summers

- Directed by: Walter Summers
- Written by: Jacques Pendower (novel); Jan Van Lusil; Walter Summers; Ralph Gilbert Bettison
- Produced by: John Argyle
- Starring: Bruce Cabot; Marta Labarr; Tamara Desni
- Cinematography: Robert LaPresle
- Edited by: Ted Richards
- Production company: Rialto Pictures
- Distributed by: Pathé Pictures International
- Release date: December 1939
- Running time: 71 minutes
- Country: United Kingdom
- Language: English

Traitor Spy (also known as The Torso Murder Mystery) is a 1939 British thriller film directed by Walter Summers and starring Bruce Cabot, Marta Labarr, Tamara Desni and Edward Lexy. It was written by Jan Van Lusil, Summers and Ralph Gilbert Bettison based on the novel of the same title by T.C.H. Jacobs (as Jacques Pendower) and was shot at Welwyn Studios with sets designed by Ian White.

== Premise ==
Both Scotland Yard and the security services are on the trail of some stolen blueprints and believe there is a link with a headless body discovered in Devon.

== Cast ==
- Bruce Cabot as Jim Healey
- Marta Labarr as Freyda Healey
- Tamara Desni as Marie Dufreyne
- Romilly Lunge as Beverley Blake
- Edward Lexy as Inspector Barnard
- Cyril Smith as Sergeant Trotter
- Percy Walsh as Lemnel
- Eve Lynd as Florrie McGowan
- Alexander Field as Yorky Meane
- Hilary Pritchard as Toni Vencini
- Davina Craig as Mabel
- Vincent Holman as Hawkeye
- Anthony Shaw as Commander Anderson
- Peter Gawthorne as Commissioner
- Sic Jukes as Hubert Kessler
- Frederick Valk as German Ambassador

== Reception ==
The Monthly Film Bulletin wrote: "This spectacular if somewhat involved story is put over with a wealth of sensational devices, at a swift pace, and with definite punch. It works up to a really exciting and suspenseful climax. The character drawing is good and the acting competent."

Kine Weekly wrote: "Spectacular thick-ear espionage melodrama, generously coloured with every traditional pigment. Sensationalism is not, however, courted at the cost of credibility, The story points the way to vigorous entertainment of urgent topicality and, at the same time, establishes a stern moral.

The Daily Film Renter wrote: "Excellent honest-to-goodness espionage drama. ... Workmanlike presentation ensures a vigorous action melodrama for the masses, with a topical note aiding its appeal."
