= Duncan Sutherland =

British art director (1905–1967)

- Born: 1 August 1905; Glasgow, Scotland; United Kingdom
- Died: 1967 (aged 61–62); London, England; United Kingdom
- Occupation: Art director
- Years active: 1931 - 1966 (film)

Duncan Sutherland (1 August 1905 – 1967) was a Scottish-born art director, based in England where he designed the sets for over eighty films and television series between the early 1930s and mid-1960s. Sutherland spent much of the 1940s employed by Ealing Studios where he worked on films including It Always Rains on Sunday and The Loves of Joanna Godden.

In the 1950s he began working on television series such as The Scarlet Pimpernel and The Count of Monte Cristo.

== Filmography ==
- The Love Race (1931)
- After Office Hours (1932)
- The Innocents of Chicago (1932)
- The Last Coupon (1932)
- On Secret Service (1933)
- Their Night Out (1933)
- No Funny Business (1933)
- Heads We Go (1933)
- Those Were the Days (1934)
- Give Her a Ring (1934)
- Mister Cinders (1934)
- Dandy Dick (1935)
- Music Hath Charms (1935)
- Drake of England (1935)
- The Crouching Beast (1935)
- Wings Over Africa (1936)
- The Avenging Hand (1936)
- Well Done, Henry (1936)
- Auld Lang Syne (1937)
- Lucky Jade (1937)
- The Mutiny of the Elsinore (1937)
- Mr. Reeder in Room 13 (1938)
- Night Alone (1938)
- Save a Little Sunshine (1938)
- Lassie from Lancashire (1938)
- My Irish Molly (1938)
- Almost a Honeymoon (1938)
- Trunk Crime (1939)
- Dead Men Are Dangerous (1939)
- Wanted by Scotland Yard (1939)
- The Dark Eyes of London (1939)
- Old Mother Riley Joins Up (1939)
- Spies of the Air (1940)
- Gaslight (1940)
- Old Mother Riley in Business (1941)
- Crook's Tour (1941)
- This England (1941)
- 'Pimpernel' Smith (1941)
- Jeannie (1941)
- The Night Has Eyes (1942)
- Thunder Rock (1942)
- San Demetrio London (1943)
- Undercover (1943)
- Nine Men (1943)
- Fiddlers Three (1944)
- For Those in Peril (1944)
- Dreaming (1944)
- Pink String and Sealing Wax (1945)
- Johnny Frenchman (1945)
- Here Comes the Sun (1946)
- Bedelia (1946)
- It Always Rains on Sunday (1947)
- The Loves of Joanna Godden (1947)
- The History of Mr. Polly (1949)
- Obsession (1949)
- Last Holiday (1950)
- Cairo Road (1950)
- Circle of Danger (1951)
- Night Was Our Friend (1951)
- The Straw Man (1953)
- Intimate Relations (1953)
- Night of the Silvery Moon (1954)
- Police Dog (1955)
- The Time of His Life (1955)
- Home and Away (1956)
- At the Stroke of Nine (1957)
- The Trollenberg Terror (1958)
- The Bandit of Zhobe (1959)
- Naked Fury (1959)
- The Night We Dropped a Clanger (1959)
- The Crowning Touch (1959)
- Jungle Street (1960)
- Fury at Smugglers' Bay (1961)
- Strongroom (1961)
- Dangerous Afternoon (1961)
- Ticket to Paradise (1961)
- The Wind of Change (1961)
- Crosstrap (1962)
- Emergency (1962)
- Gaolbreak (1962)
- Dead Man's Evidence (1962)
- Stranglehold (1963)
- The Bay of St Michel (1963)
- The Switch (1963)
- The Hi-Jackers (1963)
- Panic (1963)
- The Vulture (1966)

== Bibliography ==
- Barr, Charles. Ealing Studios. University of California Press, 1998.
