= Jack Beaver =

British composer (1900–1963)

- Born: 27 March 1900; Clapham, London
- Died: 10 September 1963 (aged 63) Battersea, London
- Occupations: Film score composer; pianist

Jack Beaver (27 March 1900 – 10 September 1963) was a British film score composer and pianist. Beaver was born in Clapham, London. He studied at the Metropolitan Academy of Music, Forest Gate and then at the Royal Academy of Music under Frederick Corder. After graduating he worked for the BBC. In the early 1930s he played with the Michael Doré Trio and wrote some concert pieces, including the three movement Sonatina for piano. He also contributed music and arrangements for various BBC radio drama and music features, including most of the radio adaptions of films produced by Douglas Moodie, throughout the 1930s and 1940s.

As (like Charles Williams) a member of the Gaumont–British Pictures composing team from the 1930s he was a prolific composer of film scores - around 40 scores between 1932 and 1947 - though many of his contributions were not credited. These included scores for the Secrets of Life series of documentaries produced between 1934 and 1947. He wrote music for Alfred Hitchcock's The 39 Steps (1935), and composed the pseudo piano concerto Portrait of Isla from the score for the 1940 Edgar Wallace film The Case of the Frightened Lady. This is perhaps the first example of a Romantic style Denham Concerto (or sometimes "tabloid piano concerto") composed especially for a film, a year before Richard Addinsell's much more famous Warsaw Concerto appeared in the film Dangerous Moonlight (1941).

Later in life Beaver was a regular contributor to the recorded music libraries, a regular resource of continuity music for BBC radio - such as News Theatre, recorded for the Chappell Music Library on 10 inch 78 RPM records in 1948. His march Cavalcade of Youth (1950) became widely known when it was used as signature tune for the BBC radio series The Barlowes of Beddington. Another example of his library music is Holiday Funfair (1954), performed by Dolf van der Linden And His Orchestra. He composed Sovereign Heritage for the National Brass Band Championships of 1954.

During the 1930s Beaver was living at 141 Gleneldon Road in Streatham. By the 1950s his address was 40 Fairfax Road, Teddington in Middlesex. He died aged 63 in Battersea, London. His son, Raymond Elgar Beaver, (19 August 1929 – 25 January 2008), was also a composer of film music.

== Selected filmography ==
- Baroud (1932)
- Jack's the Boy (1932)
- Turkey Time (1933)
- Channel Crossing (1933)
- My Old Dutch (1934)
- Admirals All (1935)
- The Crouching Beast (1935)
- The 39 Steps (1935)
- Beloved Imposter (1936)
- Wings Over Africa (1936)
- The Avenging Hand (1936)
- Sabotage (1936)
- Second Bureau (1936)
- Ball at Savoy (1936)
- Wake Up Famous (1937)
- Double Exposures (1937)
- Under a Cloud (1937)
- The Great Barrier (1937)
- Return of a Stranger (1937)
- The Wife of General Ling (1937)
- Said O'Reilly to McNab (1937)
- The Ticket of Leave Man (1937)
- It's Never Too Late to Mend (1937)
- John Halifax (1938)
- The Face at the Window (1939)
- The Case of the Frightened Lady (1940)
- Crimes at the Dark House (1940)
- The Chinese Bungalow (1940)
- The Prime Minister (1941)
- Flying Fortress (1942)
- Gaiety George (1946)
- Dusty Bates (1947)
- The Hasty Heart (1949)
- The Clue of the Missing Ape (1953)
- The Gold Express (1955)
