= The Man with the Clubfoot =

1918 novel

- 1931 American edition
- Author: Valentine Williams
- Language: English
- Series: Clubfoot
- Genre: Spy thriller
- Publisher: Jenkins (UK) McBridge (US)
- Publication date: 1918
- Publication place: United Kingdom
- Media type: Print
- Followed by: The Return of Clubfoot

The Man with the Clubfoot is a 1918 spy thriller novel by the author Valentine Williams. It is the first in his series of novels featuring the character of "Clubfoot", Germany's top secret agent Doctor Adolph Grunt. He is pitched against Desmond Okewood, a young officer employed by British intelligence. It was followed by several sequels.

== Bibliography ==
- Burton, Alan. Historical Dictionary of British Spy Fiction. Rowman & Littlefield, 2016.
- Reilly, John M. Twentieth Century Crime & Mystery Writers. Springer, 2015.
