= The Avenging Hand =

1937 British film by Victor Hanbury and Frank Richardson

- Opening titles
- Directed by: Victor Hanbury; Frank Richardson
- Written by: Reginald Long; Ákos Tolnay
- Produced by: John Stafford
- Starring: Noah Beery; Louis Borel; Kathleen Kelly
- Cinematography: James Wilson
- Edited by: Sidney Cole
- Music by: Jack Beaver
- Production company: John Stafford Productions
- Distributed by: RKO Pictures
- Release date: 28 September 1936
- Running time: 64 minutes
- Country: United Kingdom
- Language: English

The Avenging Hand (also known as Paradise Hotel) is a 1936 British crime film directed by Victor Hanbury and Frank Richardson and starring Noah Beery, Louis Borel, and Kathleen Kelly. It was written by Reginald Long and Ákos Tolnay.

== Plot ==
A Chicago gangster staying in a London hotel tries to solve the murder of one of the other guests.

== Cast ==
- Noah Beery as Lee Barwell
- Louis Borel as Pierre Charrell
- Kathleen Kelly as Gwen Taylor
- Charles Oliver as Toni Visetti
- Reginald Long as Charles Mason
- Tarva Penna as Conrad Colter
- Penelope Parkes as Elizabeth
- Billie De la Volta as Muriel
- James Harcourt as Sam Hupp

== Production ==
The film was made at Welwyn Studios as a quota quickie. Duncan Sutherland worked on the film's sets.

== Reception ==
The Monthly Film Bulletin wrote: "Much of the story is never completely explained in the film. Noah Beery is good as the crook tracking down crooks, and proves the superiority of Chicago as the training ground for the trade. The rest of the cast is adequate and James Harcourt does well as the match-seller with £100 to spend. An ordinary film with some quite good moments."

Kine Weekly wrote: "Comedy crime drama, a tedious rigmarole, flitting between the serious and the comic to no apparent purpose. A gangster element is introduced for the benefit of Noah Beery, but it is too pale an imitation of the real thing to get the picture anywhere. Here entertainment is a negligible quantity. ... Kathleen Kelly is not unattractive as the manicurist, but the rest of the players are a poor, insignificant lot. The story is unnecessarily complicated and the acting is not so hot, but the weakest department of all is the direction. The producer so quickly loses touch with the many threads that it is not long before thrills poach on comedy and comedy on thrills, and the film degenerates into a hopeless mess. The picture's appeal is to say the least, obscure."

In British Sound Films: The Studio Years 1928–1959 David Quinlan rated the film as "mediocre", calling it a "confusing thriller"

The Radio Times Guide to Films gave the film 1/5 stars, writing: "This somewhat confused thriller is feeble, forgettable and largely forgotten."
