= About Religion =

British weekly TV Show

About Religion was a UK religious affairs programme on Associated Television (ATV) 1958–1965. It was usually hosted by interviewer Julian Grenfell, with David King and John Brooking. An anthology of interviews was published in 1963.
