= Return of a Stranger (1937 film) =

- Opening titles
- Directed by: Victor Hanbury
- Written by: Rudolph Lothar (play); Ákos Tolnay; Reginald Long
- Produced by: John Stafford
- Starring: Griffith Jones; Rosalyn Boulter; Ellis Jeffreys; Athole Stewart
- Cinematography: James Wilson
- Edited by: Ralph Thomas
- Music by: Jack Beaver
- Production company: Premier-Stafford Productions
- Distributed by: RKO Pictures
- Release date: May 1937
- Running time: 70 minutes
- Country: United Kingdom
- Language: English

Return of a Stranger (also known as The Face behind the Scar) is a 1937 British drama film directed by Victor Hanbury and starring Griffith Jones, Rosalyn Boulter, Ellis Jeffries and Athole Stewart. It was written by Rudolph Lothar, Ákos Tolnay and Reginald Long based on a play by Lothar.

== Synopsis ==
James Martin plans to elope with Carol Wall, the daughter of the wealthy chairman of Wall Chemicals. While in Southampton with her, Martin is wrongly accused of murdering a man and is forced to flee to South Africa. Carol meanwhile marries a wealthy City of London financier. Martin rebuilds his life in South Africa and finishes developing a valuable new chemical formula which he had begun in England. After he is partially disfigured by an explosion in his laboratory, Martin decides to return home to clear his name, confident that he will no longer be recognised. However, Carol's husband quickly begins to suspect that the visiting South African is really Martin and alerts Scotland Yard.

== Cast ==
- Griffith Jones as James Martin
- Rosalyn Boulter as Carol Wall
- Ellis Jeffries as Lady Wall
- Athole Stewart as Sir Patrick Wall
- Cecil Ramage as John Forbes
- Constance Godridge as Esme
- Sylvia Marriott as Mary
- James Harcourt as Johnson
- Harold Scott as Peters
- Howard Douglas as Van Der Geun
- David Farrar as Doctor Young
- Peter Gawthorne as Sir Herbert Tompkin
- Edie Martin as Mrs Stevens

== Production ==
The film was made at Shepperton Studios as a Quota quickie, and was distributed by RKO Pictures.

== Reception ==
The Monthly Film Bulletin wrote: "Various elements – two men and a woman; marriage to the wrong man; false accusation of murder and ultimate vindication – make up the pattern of this somewhat complicated story. The long arm of coincidence plays a leading part, but competent direction manages to give an air of conviction even to this. There is plenty of action, and suspense is well sustained."

Kine Weekly wrote: "The story covers deal of ground, and it is directed mostly by coincidence, but with all its dependence on theatrical artifice it succeeds in gathering good drama in the course of its highly coloured perambulations."
