= James Wilson (cinematographer) =

British cinematographer

James Wilson was a British cinematographer.

The film historians Steve Chibnall and Brian McFarlane describe his work for the B movie production company The Danzigers in the 1950s as one of the company's "strongest assets", especially in his ability to create a sense of "unillusioned grimness".

== Selected filmography ==
- One of the Best (1927)
- Balaclava (1928)
- A South Sea Bubble (1928)
- The Man from Chicago (1930)
- Symphony in Two Flats (1930)
- Keepers of Youth (1931)
- Potiphar's Wife (1931)
- The Flying Fool (1931)
- Lord Camber's Ladies (1932)
- The Indiscretions of Eve (1932)
- Maid Happy (1933)
- Radio Parade (1933)
- What Happened Then? (1934)
- I Spy (1934)
- The Scotland Yard Mystery (1934)
- The Secret of the Loch (1934)
- Play Up the Band (1935)
- Death Drives Through (1935)
- The Crouching Beast (1935)
- Ball at Savoy (1936)
- Second Bureau (1936)
- The Avenging Hand (1936)
- The Luck of the Irish (1936)
- The Wife of General Ling (1937)
- Wake Up Famous (1937)
- Return of a Stranger (1937)
- Secret Journey (1939)
- What Would You Do, Chums? (1939)
- The Second Mr. Bush (1940)
- Old Mother Riley's Circus (1941)
- Salute John Citizen (1942)
- We'll Smile Again (1942)
- The Shipbuilders (1943)
- Theatre Royal (1943)
- Strawberry Roan (1944)
- The Echo Murders (1945)
- Twilight Hour (1945)
- Appointment with Crime (1946)
- Mrs. Fitzherbert (1947)
- Woman to Woman (1947)
- Dual Alibi (1947)
- Counterblast (1948)
- Don't Say Die (1950)
- Take Me to Paris (1951)
- Old Mother Riley's Jungle Treasure (1951)
- The Gay Dog (1954)
- Not So Dusty (1956)
- On the Run (1958)
- Identity Unknown (1960)
- The Spider's Web (1960)
- The Tell-Tale Heart (1960)
- So Evil, So Young (1961)
- The Court Martial of Major Keller (1961)
- She Knows Y'Know (1962)
- The Silent Invasion (1962)
- Incident at Midnight (1963)
- Unearthly Stranger (1963)
- Ricochet (1963)
- Five to One (1963)
- The Verdict (1964)
- Game for Three Losers (1965)
- Change Partners (1965)
