= Valentine Williams =

British journalist and fiction writer (1883–1946)

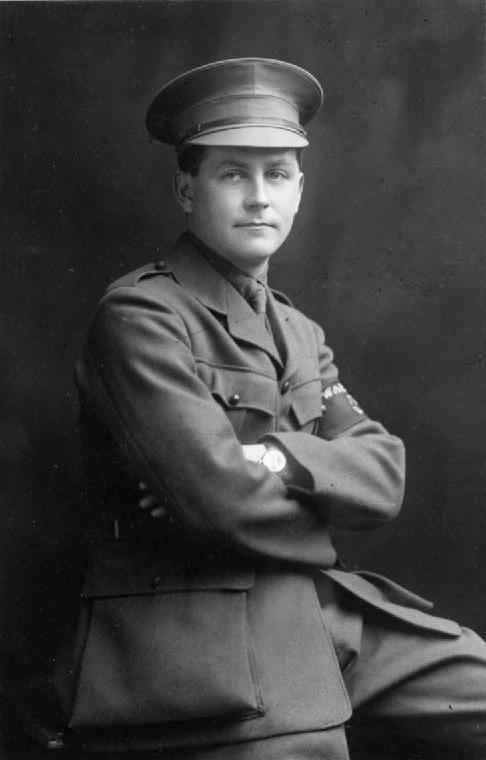
Lieutenant Valentine Williams

George Valentine Williams (1883 – 20 November 1946) was a journalist and writer of popular fiction.

Williams was born in 1883. He was the eldest son of the chief editor at Reuters; both his brother and an uncle were also journalists. He replaced Austin Harrison as the Reuters correspondent in Berlin in 1905, aged 21. In 1908, he left Reuters to join the Daily Mail, filing stories from Paris and covering the Portuguese revolution of 1910. He was in the Balkans at the outbreak of World War I and became one of the first accredited war correspondents in March 1915. William Beach Thomas had been reporting the war for the Daily Mail in the period before official accreditations were granted. When the British government relented its opposition to the presence of journalists in 1915, having been warned by Theodore Roosevelt that reporting limitations were affecting public opinion in the United States, Williams stepped into the role.

In December 1915, Williams enlisted for service in the Irish Guards and Beach Thomas took his place as an accredited reporter in France. Williams was awarded the Military Cross as a soldier and wrote two autobiographical books about his war-time experiences. In the aftermath of war, he travelled widely as a reporter, covering events such as the Versailles Peace Conference and the discovery of the tomb of Tutankhamen, as well as events in America. Harold Nicolson met him in connection with events at Versailles and described in a diary entry that "He is far too intelligent to be employed by such a paper" (the Daily Mail). It was during this period that he began writing thrillers and around 1926 gave up his post as Foreign Editor of the Daily Mail to pursue a full-time career as an author.

Williams was too old for active service at the outbreak of World War II. He joined the Secret Intelligence Service, vetting potential new recruits such as Malcolm Muggeridge and Kim Philby. (Note: Williams had befriended Mansfield Smith-Cumming, the British spymaster, during World War I and claimed to be the last person to have seen him alive.) He was transferred to the British Embassy in Washington in 1941 but soon after left for Hollywood, where he worked as a scriptwriter for Twentieth-Century Fox and Metro-Goldwyn Mayer.

Williams was married to Alice Crawford. He died on 20 November 1946 at Gotham Hospital in Manhattan, where he had travelled from England for special medical treatment.

== Selected works ==
- With Our Army in Flanders. Arnold. 1915., as by G. Valentine Williams, LCCN 15-27694
- Adventures of an Ensign. 1917.
- The Man with the Clubfoot. 1918., as by Douglas Valentine
- The Secret Hand. 1918.; also known as Okewood of the Secret Service (US edition, 1919; Project Gutenberg, 2000)
- The Return of Clubfoot. 1922.
- Yellow Streak. 1922.
- The Orange Divan. 1923.
- Clubfoot the Avenger. 1924.
- The Three of Clubs. 1924.
- The Red Mass. 1925.
- Mr Ramosi. 1926.
- The Pigeon House. 1926. (also known as The Key Man)
- The Eye in Attendance. 1927.
- The Crouching Beast (The Crouching Beast. 1928.)
- Mannequin. 1930. (also known as The Mysterious Miss Morrisot)
- The Knife Behind the Curtain. 1930.
- Death Answers the Bell. 1931.
- The Gold Comfit Box. 1932. (also known as The Mystery of the Gold Box)
- The Clock Ticks On. 1933.. First published as a newspaper serial, (London) Daily News, 1932
- Fog. 1933. (with Dorothy Rice Sims)
- The Portcullis Room. 1934.
- Masks Off at Midnight. 1934.
- The Clue of the Rising Moon. 1935.
- Dead Man Manor. 1936.
- The Spider's Touch. 1936.
- Mr Treadgold Cuts In. 1937. (also known as The Curiosity of Mr Treadgold)
- World of Action. Houghton Mifflin. 1938. (autobiography)
- The Fox Prowls. 1939.
- Double Death. 1939.
- Courier to Marrakesh (Courier to Marrakech. 1944.)
- Skeleton out of the Cupboard. 1946.
