= Almost a Honeymoon (1938 film) =

1938 British film by Norman Lee

- Directed by: Norman Lee
- Written by: Walter Ellis (play); Kenneth Horne; Ralph Neale
- Produced by: Warwick Ward
- Starring: Tommy Trinder; Linden Travers; Edmund Breon; Frederick Burtwell
- Cinematography: Bryan Langley
- Edited by: Ted Richards
- Music by: John Reynders
- Production company: Welwyn Studios
- Distributed by: Associated British
- Release date: 21 April 1938
- Running time: 80 minutes
- Country: United Kingdom
- Language: English

Almost a Honeymoon is a 1938 British comedy film directed by Norman Lee and starring Tommy Trinder, Linden Travers and Edmund Breon. It was based on the 1930 play Almost a Honeymoon by Walter Ellis, previously filmed in 1930. Its plot is about a young man who urgently needs to find a wife so that he can get a lucrative job in the colonial service, and sets out to persuade a woman to marry him.

It was shot at the Welwyn Studios of Associated British outside London. The film's sets were designed by the art director Duncan Sutherland.

== Cast ==
- Tommy Trinder as Peter Dibley
- Linden Travers as Patricia Quilter
- Edmund Breon as Aubrey Lovitt
- Frederick Burtwell as Charles
- Vivienne Bennett as Rita Brent
- Arthur Hambling as Adolphus
- Aubrey Mallalieu as Clutterbuck
- Ian Fleming as Sir James Hooper
- Betty Jardine as Lavinia Pepper
- Wally Patch as Bailiff

== Critical reception ==
Allmovie wrote, "nothing really happens (this is a 1938 film), but you can't censor the gleam in the supporting characters' eyes."
