= Ball at Savoy (1936 film) =

British film by Victor Hanbury

- Directed by: Victor Hanbury
- Written by: Alfred Grünwald; Fritz Löhner-Beda; Reginald Long; Ákos Tolnay
- Produced by: John Stafford
- Starring: Conrad Nagel; Marta Labarr; Fred Conyngham; Aubrey Mather
- Cinematography: James Wilson
- Edited by: David Lean
- Music by: Paul Abraham; Jack Beaver
- Production company: John Stafford Productions
- Distributed by: RKO Pictures
- Release date: 18 November 1936
- Running time: 75 minutes
- Country: United Kingdom
- Language: English

Ball at Savoy (U.S. title: With Pleasure, Madame; also known as Ball at the Savoy and Dancing Waiter) is a 1936 British operetta film directed by Victor Hanbury and starring Conrad Nagel, Marta Labarr and Fred Conyngham. It was written by Alfred Grünwald|, Fritz Löhner-Beda, Reginald Long and Ákos Tolnay, based on the 1932 operetta Ball im Savoy by Paul Abraham, which had been turned into an Austrian film in 1935. It was made at Elstree Studios.

== Plot ==
A British diplomat falls in love with a famous singer when he meets her in Cannes.

== Cast ==
- Conrad Nagel as John Egan/Baron Dupont
- Marta Labarr as Anita Stella
- Lu Ann Meredith as Mary
- Fred Conyngham as George
- Aubrey Mather as Herbert
- Fred Duprez as not Herbert
- Bela Mila as Terese
- Dino Galvani as manager
- Monti DeLyle as stranger
- Esther Kiss as Suzanne
- Tony De Lungo as maitre d'hotel
- Bruno Barnabe as train conductor

== Reception ==
The Monthly Film Bulletin wrote: "The progress of the film is slow, tortuous, and almost entirely lacking in even superficial logic. The acting all round is quite undistinguished, except for Conrad Nagel, who, in the role of a diplomat who pretends to be a Baron who pretends to be a waiter who is suspected of being a thief, and who falls in love with a glamorous international singer, actually manages to inject some real sparkle into his ridiculous part. His potentialities in the realm of sophisticated comedy deserve to be put to better use. Of the women, Lu Anne Meredith seems to have the most personality. Some may be interested by the dancing, but the rest of the film is simply dull. The odds and ends of 'naughty' by-play are pointless."

Kine Weekly wrote: "Marta Labarr, the French star, invests the role of Anita with glamour, and, although she is not too well served by the recording apparatus, interprets the tuneful songs with the unobtrusive technique of the polished vocalist. Conrad Nagel cuts an attractive figure and acts with a sense of humour as John, and Lu Anne Meredith and Fred Conyngham put over the dance numbers cleverly and with infectious enthusiasm."

Variety wrote: "Conrad Nagel, though charming, at times doesn't seem quite at ease in the role of the young diplomat, Geneva-bound, who steps off at Cannes in pursuit of an unknown face and voice. His charmer returns his affection, even though at one time it looks as though he might be a much sought-after jewel thief. Marta Labarr, in this role, is effective, although 'the beauty of her voice seems to lose in recording. Lu Anne Meredith and Fred Conyngham are admirable singing, dancing and light comedy support. Whole just barely gets by."

In British Sound Films: The Studio Years 1928–1959 David Quinlan rated the film as "mediocre", calling it: "Airy musical trifle."
