= Dodo Watts =

British actress (1910–1990)

- Picturegoer postcard c.1935 (photo by Dorothy Wilding)
- Born: Dorothy Margaret Watts; 27 December 1910; London, England
- Died: 25 December 1990 (aged 79); Teddington, Middlesex, England
- Occupation(s): Actress and casting director

Dorothy Margaret Watts (27 December 1910 – 25 December 1990), known professionally as Dodo Watts, was a British stage and film actress. She played Fay Eaton in the 1929 Broadway version of Ian Hay's play The Middle Watch, and reprised her role in the 1930 British film version the following year. When her career wound down, she became a business woman, owning a successful millinery firm in London's West End. She was later a casting director and head of casting for ABC Weekend TV (later Thames Television), and largely responsible for casting Diana Rigg in the role of Emma Peel in The Avengers TV series. She later became a theatrical agent.

== Partial filmography ==
- Confessions (1925)
- Auld Lang Syne (1929)
- The School for Scandal (1930)
- Almost a Honeymoon (1930)
- The Man from Chicago (1930)
- The Middle Watch (1930)
- Uneasy Virtue (1931)
- Her Night Out (1932)
- Impromptu (1932)
- Dora (1933)
- Hundred to One (1933)
- Little Fella (1933)
- Sing Along with Me (1952)
