= The Wife of General Ling =

- Directed by: Ladislao Vajda
- Written by: Peter Cheyney (novel); Dorothy Hope (novel); Ákos Tolnay; Reginald Long
- Produced by: John Stafford
- Starring: Griffith Jones; Valéry Inkijinoff; Adrianne Renn; Alan Napier
- Cinematography: James Wilson
- Edited by: David Lean
- Music by: Jack Beaver
- Production company: Premier-Stafford Productions
- Distributed by: RKO (UK); Gaumont-British (US)
- Release date: 7 April 1937
- Running time: 72 minutes
- Country: United Kingdom
- Language: English

The Wife of General Ling is a 1937 British drama film directed by Ladislao Vajda and starring Griffith Jones, Valéry Inkijinoff and Adrianne Renn. It was adapted from a novel by Dorothy Hope and Peter Cheyney. The film was made at Shepperton Studios by the independent company Premier-Stafford Productions.

== Plot ==
Following the murder of a loyal Chinese, John Fenton, a British secret-service agent, is aided by the European wife of a Hong Kong merchant, Mr Wong, to expose him as a rebel war lord, General Ling.

== Cast ==
- Griffith Jones as John Fenton
- Valéry Inkijinoff as General Ling / Mr. Wong
- Adrianne Renn as Tai Wong
- Alan Napier as Governor
- Anthony Eustrel as See Long
- Jiro Soneya as Yuan
- Hugh McDermott as Tracy
- Gibson Gowland as Mike
- Gabrielle Brune as Germaine
- Lotus Fragrance as Tai's Maid
- Marian Spencer as Lady Buckram
- Billy Holland as Police Sergeant
- George Merritt as Police Commissioner
- Howard Douglas as Doctor

== Notability ==
- Although R. Thomas is the editor credited, David Lean was involved feasibly with the editing.
- A poster for Wife of General Ling appears within a movie-theater backdrop in the motion picture, Boxcar Bertha.
- This film contains the only recording of the dancing of the "Mother of Chinese Modern Dance", Dai Ailian, from her time in London.
