= Almost a Honeymoon (1930 film) =

1930 film

- Directed by: Monty Banks
- Written by: Monty Banks; Walter C. Mycroft; Val Valentine
- Based on: Almost a Honeymoon by Walter Ellis
- Starring: Clifford Mollison; Dodo Watts; Lamont Dickson; Donald Calthrop
- Cinematography: Jack E. Cox
- Edited by: Emile de Ruelle; A.C. Hammond
- Release date: 19 September 1930 (London)
- Running time: 100 minutes
- Country: United Kingdom
- Language: English

Almost a Honeymoon is a 1930 British comedy film directed by Monty Banks and starring Clifford Mollison, Dodo Watts and Donald Calthrop. It was written by Banks, Walter C. Mycroft and Val Valentine based on the 1930 play Almost a Honeymoon by Walter Ellis. It was made by British International Pictures at their Elstree Studios. A second adaptation was made in 1938.

== Premise ==
An ambitious young man secures a job in the colonial service, the only stipulation being that he needs to be married, which he isn't. He has just twenty four hours to find a woman to persuade to marry him.

== Cast ==
- Clifford Mollison as Basil Dibley
- Dodo Watts as Rosalie Quilter
- Lamont Dickson as Cuthbert de Gray
- Donald Calthrop as Charles, the butler
- C. M. Hallard as Sir James Jephson
- Winifred Hall as Lavinia Pepper
- Pamela Carme as Margaret Brett
- Edward Thane as Clutterbuck

== Reception ==
Film Weekly wrote: "This series of farcical situations in and about bedrooms contains a whole lot of genuine fun, some very witty dialogue, and a certain risqué favour. Two of the most amusing roles are excellently played by Donald Calthrop and Cliff Mollison. As a valet and his impecunious master they form a delightful comedy team is. Dodo Watts, a clever young actress, is not to happily photographed; and is unfortunately cast. She is not really at home in pure farce. Lamont Dickson overacts badly as the silly ass who finds his fiancée in his bedroom. Altogether, though, this film is a workmanlike talkie version of a very funny play."

Kine Weekly wrote: "Piquant farcical comedy ... Although the picture is a trifle long and has a number of dull moments, the impetus given by the many bright ones carries it along at a steady gait, and results in the proceedings being kept very much alive all the time. There is an air of naughtiness about it all which adds the necessary touch of spice, but fundamentally the comedy is entirely innocuous, and is, in fact, wholesome and refreshing in its appeal."
