= Victor Hanbury =

British film director and producer (1897–1954)

W. Victor Hanbury (1897 – 14 December 1954) was a British film director and producer.

Entering the film industry in 1919 after service in the First World War, he became a director and producer in the early 1930s. His last film as a director was Hotel Reserve (which he also co-produced) in 1944. He continued to produce into the 1950s. He was initially credited as both producer and director of The Sleeping Tiger (1954), but the film was actually directed by Joseph Losey. He was born in and died in London, England.

== Selected filmography ==
- The Beggar Student (1931)
- Where Is This Lady? (1932)
- No Funny Business (1933)
- Dick Turpin (1933)
- Spring in the Air (1934)
- There Goes Susie (1934)
- Admirals All (1935)
- The Crouching Beast (1935)
- Beloved Imposter (1936)
- The Avenging Hand (1936)
- Second Bureau (1936)
- Ball at Savoy (1936)
- Return of a Stranger (1937)
- It Happened to One Man (1940)
- Squadron Leader X (1943)
- Death Goes to School (1953)
- River Beat (1954, producer)
