= The Gallant Pimpernel =

Novel collection

The Gallant Pimpernel, First Edition

The Gallant Pimpernel is a collection of four of The Scarlet Pimpernel novels by Baroness Orczy in a single binding, published in 1939 by Hodder & Stoughton.

The collection was one of several omnibus volumes through which Hodder & Stoughton reissued Orczy's individual Scarlet Pimpernel titles for the popular market.

== Contents ==
Scarlet Pimpernel Omnibus

- Lord Tony's Wife
- The Way of the Scarlet Pimpernel
- Sir Percy Leads the Band
- The Triumph of the Scarlet Pimpernel

== Other Pimpernel Collections ==
- The Scarlet Pimpernel etc. 1930 Hodder & Stoughton

re-released as The Scarlet Pimpernel Omnibus in 1952

- The Scarlet Pimpernel
- I Will Repay
- Eldorado
- Sir Percy Hits Back
