= Adventures of the Scarlet Pimpernel =

1929 short story collection by Baroness Orczy

- Cover of the 1st Edition
- Author: Baroness Orczy
- Language: English
- Series: The Scarlet Pimpernel
- Genre: Adventure, Historical short stories
- Publisher: Hutchinson & Co
- Publication date: 1929
- Publication place: United Kingdom
- Media type: Print (hardback & paperback)
- Pages: 280 pp
- Preceded by: Sir Percy Hits Back
- Followed by: The Triumph of the Scarlet Pimpernel

Adventures of the Scarlet Pimpernel is the second collection of short stories written by Baroness Orczy about the gallant English hero, the Scarlet Pimpernel and his League. It was first published in 1929 by Hutchinson & Co. The stories, which are listed below, are set in 1793 but appear in no particular order. They occasionally refer to events in other books in the series, and Orczy frequently reuses plot lines and ideas from the longer Pimpernel novels.

== Contents ==
=== "Fie, Sir Percy!" ===
Citoyen Lauzet, Chief of section in the rural division of the department Seine et Oise, is perturbed by the Pimpernel's success in rescuing the Comte and Comtesse de Tournon-d'Agenay and their three children from under his nose. Concerned about how he can possibly deal with the English spies, he sends for his friend Armand Chauvelin who has some experience in dealing with the Scarlet Pimpernel. Chauvelin advises Lauzet to pick a family of aristo traitors who will appeal to the English gang (a pretty woman, an old man, some young children and preferably a nice cripple or imbecile to appeal to their sense of injustice) and then use them to prime a trap. After selecting some suitable bait in the form of Citizen Desèze, his invalid wife and pretty daughter, they are transported towards Paris in a diligence with a seemingly weak guard.. however the other travellers in the stagecoach are really soldiers in disguise – ready to strike back should the Pimpernel and his gang attack.

=== The Principal Witness ===
In May 1793, committed republicans the widow Leseur and her son Achille run a profitable business selling wine. Their maid-of-all-work Joséphine Palmier, who is pretty and dainty, has caught Achille's eye and having made up his mind that he is in love with her, he asks her to marry him. Joséphine refuses him categorically and firmly, telling him that she can give him no love in return. Incensed at her rejection, he gets his mother to accuse Joséphine of theft, hoping that when faced with the prospect of marrying him or the guillotine, she will pick the former. Joséphine again refuses. In court, she asserts her innocence and accuses Leseur of being a false witness. The Attorney-General tells her she must prove she is innocent but he won't accept her mother's testimony. Joséphine seems unwilling to name another witness to her alibi when suddenly Citizen George Gradin, known as Cyrano, announces to the court that he lives in the same street as her mother and that the Palmiers are frequently visited by an aristocrat, who was at Joséphine's house at the hour in question and is therefore the principal witness. Joséphine pales at this statement and insists that she was home alone with her maman. Cyrano and his gang fail to track down the witness, but back in court denounce Joséphine as an aristocrat whose real name is de Lamoignan and, much to the disgust of Achille, Gradin declares that he will marry her to get even with the mystery aristo...

=== The Stranger from Paris ===
In January 1793, Citizen Campon, the Chief Commissary of Police in Limours, is still reeling following the rescue of half a dozen aristos from the local comissariat by the Scarlet Pimpernel and his league. Worried about further intervention by the English, he writes to his friend Citizen Chauvelin for advice on what to do next. Chauvelin is unable to leave Paris, but suggests that Campon should secure a pack of aristos (the more innocent and pathetic the better), let people know he has incarcerated them, and wait for the inevitable rescue attempt—taking whatever precautions are necessary. He also assures Campon that by the next day, he will receive help in carrying out his plan from Citizen Mayet, one of the best trackers of criminals and spies known to the committees in Paris. They start to put their plan into action when they hear that the English spies have been spotted at a local abandoned chateâu. Campon takes some men and heads off to investigate, leaving the stranger from Paris in charge of the aristos. Although the plot at first appears to be very similar to elements of Mam'zelle Guillotine, Orczy throws in an unexpected twist.

=== "Fly-By-Night" ===
A group of young men who are all ardent royalists, hold secret meetings of the "Club des Fils du Royanne" in the cellar of an old house, where they talk politics and swear allegiance to the young King Louis XVII. An old wastrel called Servan keeps watch for them during their sittings and normally they don't meet unless he is present. However although Servan is away and they have promised to postpone their next meeting until his return, it's 13 October 1793 and the trial of Marie Antoinette will begin the following day. Ignoring Servan's warnings, the group call a hurried meeting to discuss the situation but it's not long before the ominous call "Open in the name of the Republic" is heard and they are trapped like rats in a burrow. After a good fight, fifteen of the young conspirators are captured and the rest left for dead. It is only the following day that the Chief Commissary realises that one person is missing – Félicien Lézennes, chairman of the Club des Fils du Royanne – but where can he have gone and what fate now awaits his family, who are being watched by spies from the Committee of Public Safety?

=== The Lure of the Old Chateau ===
Citizen Fernand Malzieu, is an actor who commands the love of his fellow citizens. A comic genius on the stage, witty, genial and handsome he is adored by women and respected by men, but his popularity has been noticed by the Committee of Public Safety, for they cannot allow a man to remain in such a position of strength. Citizen Chauvelin is on the case and soon realises that he cannot simply arrest Malzieu, so comes up with a plan to discredit the actor and knock him off his popular pedestal.

One day in late September he is visited by a lawyer who tell him that his estranged cousin Désiré Malzieu has died leaving the old family château of Maljovins to Fernand on condition that he lives there. Fernand has always loved the château and rushes to tell his fiancée Céleste at her house in Saint-Brieuc, where he meets Sir Percy, who is obviously an old friend. On hearing the news of his inheritance, Percy becomes suspicious and warns Fernand to be careful, urging him to leave his first visit to Maljovians for at least a week. Fernand laughs at the thought that someone might want to trap him and resolves to go that very night, but four days later Céleste is scared to death, for Fernand has not been in touch and even missed a dress rehearsal at the theatre.

=== In the Tiger's Den ===
The league of the Scarlet Pimpernel have been at work near Bordet, rescuing two old calotins from under the nose of Citizen Sergeant Renault. Banished to Holland for his carelessness, Sergeant Renault is replaced by Citizen Papillon, a special officer sent from Paris to take over the detachment of the National Guard. Papillon is determined to stop the English spies from causing any more trouble, so when he hears that they are hiding out in a derelict cottage he sends his soldiers to capture them. It soon becomes obvious that the situation has been planned by the Pimpernel as a way to distract the guard while he attempts to rescue a group of priests being held at the nearby Duchess Anne tower. However, as soon as Sir Percy climbs up the tower and through the window where the priests are being held, he realises that he has fallen into a trap – for waiting for him in the room are a dozen members of the Committee of Public Safety and his arch enemy Chauvelin. After a brief fight where Percy gets a good thrashing, they tie him securely to a table and lock the door, leaving him a helpless prisoner, little more than an insentient log...

=== The Little Doctor ===
Late September 1793 in a picturesque corner of Brittany and the Scarlet Pimpernel and Docteur Lescar are watching a schooner disappear over the horizon towards England and safety. The old Docteur, who helped Sir Percy save the La Forest family (who are on the schooner), is voicing concern for the Englishman's safety – though not his own, asserting that "Even the most hot-headed patriot knows that the country could not afford to send all its doctors to the guillotine". Despite his confidence, several days later Lescar finds himself being questioned about the English spy by a stranger. Lescar is popular in the area and the crowd in the tavern starts to get uneasy at the treatment of the good Doctor especially when it is revealed that the stranger is none other than Citizen Péret, a member of the Committee of Public Safety. Péret senses the atmosphere and backs off, but before long his attention turns to a conversation between three mariners / smugglers who are discussing seeing an Englishman (who might be the Pimpernel) being attended by Docteur Lescar in the Rue des Pipots. Péret sends some soldiers to check the address and they report that, although the house was empty, they have found a quantity of smuggled English goods...as well as note addressed to Citizen Dieudonné (one of the mariners) from the Pimpernel arranging to meet him at the usual place at 10pm that evening. Threatened with the guillotine, Dieudonné eventually tells Péret that the trysting place is the house of Docteur Lescar and denounces the little Doctor as a traitor...

=== The Chief's Way ===
The early days of the league, and Marguerite Blakeney has successfully pleaded with her husband not to take the traitorous Lord Kulmsted (see 'The Traitor' in The League of the Scarlet Pimpernel) on his latest mission. Several members of the league would have liked to extend the prohibition to young Lord Fanshawe, who, despite a keen start, was wilful & obstinate – an inveterate gambler who was apt to turn very nasty if matters didn't go the way he desired.

Fanshawe has, for several years, been in love with Aline, the daughter of The Comte d'Ercourt, whom he first met before the revolution when she was a child of sixteen. At this time Paul Notara, a good-looking teacher at the local school who lived with his mother, was also passionately in love with Aline. After his mother died, Notara declared his love to Aline, but her brother François, finding the schoolteacher in a compromising situation with his sister, beats Paul to within an inch of his life with a riding whip for daring to make love to the daughter of a French aristocrat. Notara is permanently scarred by the attack, losing an eye.

Four years later and the old regime has been swept away. Notara is a republican agitator and the d'Ercourt family are being condemned as traitors. Fanshawe has thoughts for no-one by Aline, but after realising that Notara still has deep feelings for Aline, the Pimpernel wants to save him, as well as the whole d'Ercourt family from their inevitable fate under the guillotine. Dressed as musicians (see Sir Percy Leads the Band), the league are able to influence the happenings at the Chateau, but can Sir Percy stop Fanshawe's jealousy from ruining everything?
