= The Elusive Pimpernel =

The Elusive Pimpernel may refer to:

- The Elusive Pimpernel (novel), a 1908 novel by Baroness Orczy
- The Elusive Pimpernel (1919 film), an adaptation of the novel
- The Elusive Pimpernel (1950 film), an adaptation of the Baroness Orczy novel The Scarlet Pimpernel
