= I Will Repay =

I Will Repay may refer to:

- I Will Repay (novel), a 1906 novel by Baroness Emma Orczy
- I Will Repay (1917 film), a 1917 American drama film directed by William P. S. Earle
- I Will Repay (film), a 1923 British silent film
- An episode of the Canadian TV series Forever Knight
