= The Scarlet Pimpernel Looks at the World =

- Author: Baroness Orczy
- Language: English
- Series: The Scarlet Pimpernel
- Genre: Essays; social commentary
- Publisher: Cassell & Co, London
- Publication date: 1933
- Publication place: United Kingdom
- Media type: Print (hardback & paperback)
- Preceded by: Pimpernel and Rosemary

The Scarlet Pimpernel Looks at the World is a collection of essays by Baroness Emmuska Orczy, originally published in 1933 by Cassell & Co of London. Subtitled A Holiday Book for Young and Old but Not for the Highbrow, it presents a commentary on the society, culture and politics of the 1930s narrated in the voice of Orczy's fictional hero Sir Percy Blakeney, the Scarlet Pimpernel.

Rather than a work of fiction in the manner of the Scarlet Pimpernel adventure novels, the book uses the eighteenth-century aristocrat as a mouthpiece through whom Orczy offers her own opinions on the contemporary world. Throughout the essays Sir Percy "puts up his quizzing-glass" at modern life and repeatedly argues that romance, courage and adventure remain as abundant in the twentieth century as they were in his own age, despite a widespread belief that they had been lost. It is one of several books that Orczy built around her best-known character but which fall outside the main sequence of Pimpernel adventures.

== Background ==
Orczy first introduced the Scarlet Pimpernel in a stage play co-written with her husband Montagu Barstow and in the 1905 novel of the same name, and over the following decades she produced numerous sequels and related works featuring the character, his ancestors and his descendants. The Scarlet Pimpernel Looks at the World appeared in 1933, the same year as the adventure novel The Way of the Scarlet Pimpernel, and revives Sir Percy not for a new rescue mission but as a commentator who returns, invisibly, to observe the modern era.

The book opens with a foreword written by Montagu Barstow, Orczy's husband, who recounts her Hungarian childhood, her father Baron Felix Orczy's career as a musician and conductor, the family's move from Budapest through Brussels to London, and her training as an artist at Heatherley's, where the couple met. Barstow also relates the often-repeated anecdote in which Orczy conceived the character while waiting for a train at Temple Underground station, describing how the figure of Sir Percy seemed to appear before her in his caped coat and quizzing-glass.

== Contents ==
The volume consists of the foreword followed by twenty-eight short chapters, each treating a different aspect of contemporary life from Sir Percy's vantage point and written in the character's mannered, archaic idiom, complete with his habitual exclamations.

Recurring themes include the persistence of romance and adventure in an age the author's contemporaries considered prosaic; the reserved but, in Orczy's view, deeply romantic character of the English; and a defence of modern youth against charges of decadence. Several chapters voice the author's social and political opinions: a warning that "Progress" risks becoming a destructive "steamroller", coupled with a sharp criticism of the ideal of social equality; praise for self-reliance, sincerity and hard work as the foundations of success; and encouragement of emigration to the British colonies, which are presented as a frontier for enterprising men and women.

Other essays celebrate the independence of modern women, treat the growth of large businesses and commerce as itself a form of romance, and hail the wireless as among the most romantic inventions of the age. The chapter "The Worst Blot on Your Civilization" is a forceful denunciation of modern warfare, in which Sir Percy contrasts the supposedly chivalrous combat of the past with the mechanised slaughter of the First World War and argues for strengthening the League of Nations and creating an international police force to keep the peace. The closing chapters turn to the appeal of antiques and "old things" and to love and marriage, which Orczy presents through her hero as life's most romantic adventure.

== Publication ==
The Scarlet Pimpernel Looks at the World was published in London by Cassell & Co in 1933. It is among the least widely known of Orczy's Pimpernel-related books. The text is in the public domain in Australia and has been made available online by Project Gutenberg Australia.
