= The Emperor's Candlesticks (film) =

The Emperor's Candlesticks is the title of two film adaptations of the novel of the same title:

- The Emperor's Candlesticks (1936 film), an Austrian film starring Sybille Schmitz and Karl Ludwig Diehl
- The Emperor's Candlesticks (1937 film), an American production starring William Powell and Luise Rainer
