= István Kolber =

Hungarian politician

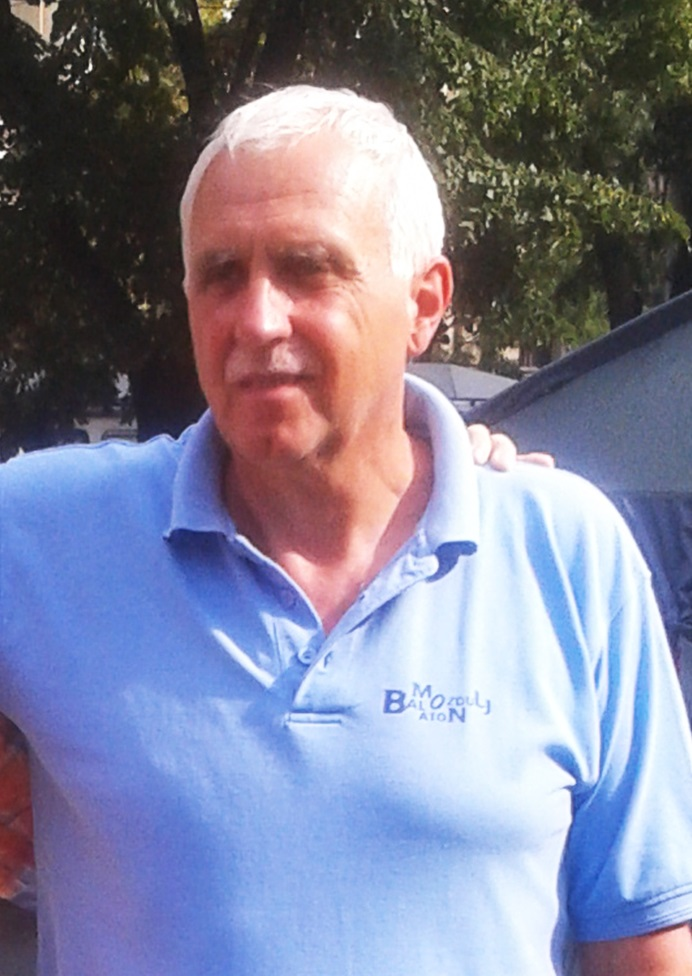
- István Kolber in 2012

Member of the National Assembly
- In office 15 May 2002 – 5 May 2014

Personal details
- Born: 26 June 1954 (age 71) Orci, Hungary
- Party: MSZMP (?–1989); MSZP (1989–2011); DK (2011– )
- Occupation: Jurist, Politician

István Kolber (born 26 June 1954) is a Hungarian politician and jurist, who served as Minister without portfolio for Regional Development and Convergence between 2004 and 2006. He was a member of the National Assembly of Hungary from 2002 to 2014.

== Professional career ==
István Kolber was born on 26 June 1954 in Orci, Somogy County, as the son of Imre Kolber and Rózsa Sebők. He is married to Terézia Ternyák since 1975, and is father of two daughters, Kinga (b. 1978) and Adél (b. 1983). Kolber finished his secondary studies at the Táncsics Mihály Secondary Grammar School of Kaposvár in 1972. He earned a degree of law at the University of Pécs in 1978. He took professional examination in law in 1983.

Kolber started his career as rapporteur then chief rapporteur in the organizational and legal department of the Executive Committee of Somogy County Council from 1978 to 1983. Meanwhile, he joined the Hungarian Socialist Workers' Party (MSZMP) and functioned as Deputy Head of the Administrative Department of the MSZMP Somogy County Committee between 1983 and 1988. He served as Head of the Legal Department of the Somogy County Council from 1988 to 1991. Kolber was President of the Somogy County section of the Faculty of Hungarian Public Administration between 1991 and 2001. Beside that he also acted as national vice-president of the organization between 1996 and 1998.

== Political career ==
After the transition to democracy, he joined the Hungarian Socialist Party (MSZP) and retained his membership in the re-formed General Assembly of Somogy County from 1991 until 2010, and acted as its vice-president from 1991 to 1994. Beside that, he also chaired the Alps-Adriatic Working Community in that period. After the 1994 Hungarian local elections, Kolber served as President of the General Assembly of Somogy County between 1994 and 1998. He was also the founding president of the South Transdanubia Regional Spatial Development Council from 1997 to 1998. He worked as regional director of the OTP Bank Real Estate plc. from 1998 to 2002. Kolber led the MSZP faction in the General Assembly of Somogy County between 1999 and 2004. He was also a member of the party's national board from 1998 to 2000. He served as vice-chairman (2000–2003), then chairman (2003–2011) of the MSZP local branch in Somogy County.

Kolber was elected a Member of Parliament via his party's regional list of Somogy County in the 2002 parliamentary election. In the parliament, he was a member of the Committee on the Environment for a brief time in 2002, then Regional Development Committee and Tourism Committee from 2002 to 2004. He was Chairman of the Balaton Development Council between September 2002 and December 2004. After Prime Minister Ferenc Gyurcsány formed his first government in October 2004, Kolber was appointed as Minister without portfolio for Regional Development and Convergence, serving in this capacity between 4 October 2004 and 8 June 2006. Regional development, tourism, housing and construction, as well as key municipal investments belonged to his responsibilities. Kolber was elected MP for Kaposvár (Somogy County Constituency II) in the 2006 parliamentary election. As a secretary of state within the Prime Minister's Office, he was a member of the Development Policy Steering Committee (FIT) responsible for regional development from 1 January 2007 to 14 May 2008. He served as State Secretary to the Minister without Portfolio for Research and Development from 15 May 2008 to 15 April 2009. He also functioned as the prime minister's commissioner for the construction development of the Taszár Air Base between 2006 and 2010.

Kolber was re-elected MP via the MSZP regional list of Somogy County in the 2010 parliamentary election. He was a member of the Committee on Education and Science from 2009 to 2014 and the Municipal and Regional Development Committee in 2010. After the 2010 election, Kolber belonged to Gyurcsány's inner circle, which heavily criticized the leadership of the MSZP. As a result, he joined Democratic Coalition Platform founded by the former prime minister. When the platform split from the Socialists on 22 October 2011 he joined to newly formed party and left the MSZP and its parliamentary group. Formally, Kolber was an independent MP until 2014. Kolber has been President of the National Council (OT) of the DK and also President of his party foundation, the Foundation for the New Republic since 2011. Kolber was one those four DK politicians (including Gyurcsány) in September 2012, who participated in a one-week long hunger strike against the voter-registration plan proposed by the ruling Fidesz.

== Awards ==
Kolber is an honorary citizen of fifteen settlements in Somogy County, including Barcs (2006) and his birthplace Orci (2004).
