= The Way of the Scarlet Pimpernel =

- 1933 First Edition
- Author: Baroness Orczy
- Language: English
- Series: The Scarlet Pimpernel
- Genre: Adventure, Historical novel
- Published: 1933 Hodder & Stoughton
- Publication place: United Kingdom
- Media type: Print (Hardback & Paperback)
- Pages: 256 pp
- Preceded by: Lord Tony's Wife
- Followed by: Eldorado

The Way of the Scarlet Pimpernel, by Baroness Orczy, is another sequel book to the adventure tale, The Scarlet Pimpernel. First published in 1933, it is 6th in the series and one of the shorter Scarlet Pimpernel books. A French-language version, translated and adapted by Charlotte and Marie-Louise Desroyses, was also produced under the title Les Métamorphoses du Mouron Rouge.

The story features the Pimpernel's arch enemy Chauvelin, as well as introducing the Austrian Baron de Batz, a real historical figure who also appears in Eldorado and Sir Percy Leads the Band.

== Plot summary ==
The novel is set in Paris in 1793, during the Reign of Terror. The lawyer Bastien de Croissy is murdered after he attempts to blackmail powerful men in the Revolutionary government with papers proving their corruption. His widow, Louise, and their delicate young son, Charles-Léon, are told that the boy needs country air, but the travel permits required to leave Paris are impossible to obtain. Louise's devoted friend Josette Gravier is convinced that her hero, the Scarlet Pimpernel, will come to their aid—refusing to believe he exists only in her imagination—and sets out into the streets of Paris to make contact with him.

Josette and her sweetheart, Maurice Reversac, fall into the hands of the merciless Chauvelin, who hopes to use them to trap his enemy. As ever, the Scarlet Pimpernel proves more than a match for Chauvelin, rescuing the young couple and the de Croissy family from the guillotine.
