= Fire in Stubble =

1912 novel by Emma Orczy

- Author: Baroness Orczy
- Language: English
- Genre: Romance novel
- Publisher: Methuen
- Publication date: 1912
- Publication place: United Kingdom
- Media type: Print (hardback & paperback)
- Pages: 410

Fire in Stubble (US: "The Noble Rogue"), was written by Baroness Orczy and first published in 1912. The book was illustrated by Arthur Herbert Buckland.

== Plot summary ==
The book centres on the love life of Rose Marie, the only daughter of M. Legros, tailor-in-chief to His Majesty the King of France. As an infant Rose was espoused to Rupert Keyston, a mere child himself at the time. Over the years Rupert's position has changed from one of poverty and obscurity to one of wealth, and he now holds the honorable position of the Earl of Stowmaries. Rupert has not seen his child-bride since his espousals, and on reaching manhood conceives a dastardly plot to free himself from the unwanted union by persuading his cousin Michael to impersonate him when he is finally called upon to ratify his engagement, and claim his bride. Once this has happened, he fully intends to get his marriage annulled, on the score of his wife's unfaithfulness with his cousin.

The mock nuptials are concluded with a dance in the workshop of M. Legros

The couples fell back one by one, panting against the wall, while only one pair remained in the centre, now twirling and twirling in a cloud of dust. The man's head 'was bent, for he was over tall, and towered above every one else in the room. He was a head taller than she was, but he looked straight down at her, as he held her, straight into her eyes-those beautiful blue eyes of hers, which he had thought so cold.

How it all happened afterwards she could never say. She had been dancing with her lord, looking up into his face, glowing with ardent love. She was still so dizzy, with the frantic whirl of the dance, that she hardly remembered being lifted into the saddle, and landed safely in the strong arms of her lord. In the forefront were papa and mamma, half laughing, half crying, waving hands and mopping tears...

No other ride had been just like this one, just one slight shifting of her lissome body, to settle more comfortably. One little movement, which seemed to bring her yet a little nearer to him

The wild and lawless Michael, who agreed to his part in this base deed in return for gold, is suddenly caught hopelessly in the charms of the lovely Rose Marie – but he is determined not to lose his prize. Papa Legros, on being informed of the trick that has been practiced on his child, pursues the couple hotly, and brings back his beloved daughter the same evening. So Michael's punishment begins. His love for Rose Marie transforms him from a reprobate to a chivalrous gentleman. After a series of exciting episodes they are eventually re-united. His trial as a Papist and traitor is dramatically told, and Rose Marie's evidence that he was with her on the dates in question saves his head from being exhibited at Tyburn.
