= Meadowsweet (novel) =

1912 novel by Emma Orczy

- Author: Baroness Orczy
- Language: English
- Genre: Historical novel
- Publisher: Hutchinson & Co
- Publication date: 1912
- Publication place: United Kingdom
- Media type: Print (hardback)
- Pages: 376 pp

Written by Baroness Orczy, the author of The Scarlet Pimpernel, Meadowsweet was first published in 1912.

== Plot summary ==
When their mother died, Olive and Boadicea were sent to live with their mother's sister, Caroline, and her husband Jasper Hemingford on Old Manor Farm. The farm is remote with few neighbours and the girls do exactly as they want and have Aunt Caroline twisted completely round their thumb. Jasper is a distant figure, spending most of his time in his museum room with his nose stuck in a book or studying his collection and muttering to himself in Latin.

It was hardly surprising then that Olive, the elder of the girls, sought to find herself a rich husband who would whisk her away from the lonely farm to the highs of London society, and this she did three years earlier, marrying Sir Baldwin Jefferys, a middle aged gentleman of wealth and position.

The story starts in June 1835. Olive has been the subject of society gossip after spending too much time in the company of Lieutenant Jack Carrington of HMS Dolphin and her reputation has suffered as a result. Sir Baldwin knows the Lieutenant is incapable of vulgar intrigue but Olive has given him the full charm offensive. Enraged as his wife's behaviour, Sir Baldwin has insisted that she must leave London mid-way through the season. Olive in turn accuses him of insane jealously and she agrees, only on the condition that she can spend the month at her childhood home in Thanet.

After accompanying his wife to the farm for the first time since their wedding, Sir Baldwin is about to leave when he runs into Cousin Barnaby in the hall. Barnaby bemoans the addition of another female to the household and declares that he is spending all his time avoiding women and sailors, for HMS Dolphin has just put into Ramsgate harbour.

Sir Baldwin suspects this might be the reason why his wife was so amenable to leaving London, even though he doesn't want to believe her capable of such duplicity. He decides to stay until the evening, so he can talk to Olive and flushed with rage he goes to catch up with his friend Mr Culpepper for a couple of hours to calm down.

After he leaves an almighty commotion erupts from outside as a stranger starts shouting that a young girl is in danger. This is followed by Boadicea's entrance – crashing through the loft skylight while clutching a nest of owl eggs. The eggs are smashed by the fall, much to the stranger's amusement – The stranger is soon revealed to be none other than Lieutenant Jack Carrington.

Aunt Caroline is delighted to see the son of her old friend Mamie Carrington and invites him to stay for supper. While waiting for Olive to come down, Jack starts to tease Boadicea, holding her hands and kissing her on the cheek and neck while she protests and gets redder and redder. Olive catches them like this and with a disapproving look tells Jack to leave Boadicea alone as she looks like a bedraggled chicken. Jack realises he has made a grave mistake by paying attention to another woman in Olive's presence, even if that attention was meant purely in brotherly kindness Embarrassed by Olive's comments about her appearance, and upset by the way Jack acts when her sister is in the room, Boadicea produces a passionate outburst about how she hates mincing 'ladies' with their white hands and chicken livers and storms out of the room.

When Olive and Jack are left alone it becomes apparent that she is the one pushing the relationship, Jack does not want to get involved with a married woman, even one as beautiful as Lady Jefferys and he spurns her advances. She then demands that he must return her letters later that evening.

Olive is looking forward to supper, as Jack's presence will surely teach her husband a lesson. However, Sir Baldwin shows no reaction when he returns to find the Lieutenant in the house, and worse still for Olive, Boadicea comes down to supper dressed and acting like a charming young lady, tomboy manners put to the side. Her complete change in appearance and demeanour means that it is Boadicea rather than Olive who is the centre of attention, and in a fit of pique Olive accuses her of throwing herself at the Lieutenant and suggests she should be sent to boarding school for a year.

Sir Baldwin finally leaves for his estate racked with jealousy and not without reason, for at 10pm when all are in bed, Olive tiptoes downstairs to meet Jack, who has promised to return her letters. Jack is bewildered to find the house is in darkness. Having carefully engineered the situation, Olive moves in to kiss him, and asks him to tell her that he loves her – Jack is almost about to relent when he hears a noise – Boadicea is standing outside the door. Olive accuses her of eavesdropping but Boadicea is adamant that she came down because she saw a second man arrive on horseback and the next moment Sir Baldwin is banging on the front door demanding to be let in.

Sir Baldwin is furious to find Jack with his wife while everyone else is in bed and forcefully demands an explanation from Olive, waking the whole house. Olive's answer to her predicament is to insist that she was playing gooseberry for Boadicea and the Lieutenant claiming her sister had set up the rendezvous and that she had heard the child leave her room and followed.

Boadicea cannot understand why her sister is telling such lies about her but accepts the role she has been forced into, even though it could mean public disgrace. This she does because she loves her sister and she understands that Olive is in grave danger from her husband. Sir Baldwin insists that he does not believe the story and Jack then tells him that he came to ask for Boadicea's hand in marriage. Realising that she might as well go the whole hog, Boadicea confirms the story is true and announces that she has accepted.

Over the next month Jack spends most evenings at the farm and before long he has fallen madly in love with Boadicea and she with him, this is obvious to everyone but the self-obsessed Olive, who still thinks the engagement is a farce that will be broken off as soon as the Lieutenant has returned to sea. Her illusions are shattered however after Cousin Barnaby starts complaining about young love birds, and having realised that her plans are not working out as expected Olive spins a web of lies, splitting the young couple up and inflicting misery and pain on both of them.
