= Citizen Chauvelin =

Fictional character in The Scarlet Pimpernel

Armand Chauvelin
- First appearance: The Scarlet Pimpernel
- Last appearance: Mam'zelle Guillotine
- Created by: Baroness Orczy
- Portrayed by: William Burress; Norman Page; Raymond Massey; Cyril Cusack; Stanley Van Beers; Ian McKellen; Martin Shaw; Terrence Mann (Original Broadway Cast); Rex Smith (B'way Replacement); Marc Kudisch (B'way replacement); William Michals (Touring)

In-universe information
- Gender: Male
- Nationality: French

Citizen Armand Chauvelin (Citoyen Chauvelin in French) is the antagonist in Baroness Emmuska Orczy's classic novel The Scarlet Pimpernel, most of its sequels, and the various plays and films derived from the original work.

== Overview ==
He is cast as Sir Percy Blakeney's arch-enemy throughout the novel's many sequels and appears in almost all of them. The former ambassador to the Court of St. James's (The Scarlet Pimpernel, The Elusive Pimpernel), Chauvelin is both a representative in the National Assembly and the chief agent of the Committee of Public Safety. Chauvelin is also an old friend of the Pimpernel's wife Lady Blakeney, having been a frequenter of her salon in Paris before her marriage (and is depicted in some film treatments as being Marguerite's suitor or lover prior to her marriage to Sir Percy).

Chauvelin is a ruthless, amoral patriot who firmly believes that the League of the Scarlet Pimpernel is a threat and a mockery to the French Republic, and uses his position incessantly to attempt to destroy or discredit the Pimpernel and his associates. He is described as dressing always in black. While he is depicted as being a small and physically weak man, he is extremely intelligent and cunning, able to manipulate those around him and devise elaborate plots. He is fearless concerning his own safety, except so far as his own incapacity or death might foil his plans.

Although he learns the true identity of the Pimpernel early on, Chauvelin keeps the knowledge to himself, partially because he realises that if the government knew, he would lose his leverage over them as the only man who knows what the Pimpernel looks like. Also, his bitter hatred of Sir Percy has become an obsession and he wishes to be personally responsible for stopping the Pimpernel's interference in French politics. Chauvelin's last appearance is in Mam'zelle Guillotine; between then and the events of A Child of the Revolution, he had been executed, presumably in the wake of the Thermidorean Reaction.

Orczy reveals that Chauvelin has a more human side and fills in some background details -- among other things, mentioning his first name, Armand, for the only time in the series -- in the novel Sir Percy Hits Back which features his daughter, Fleurette. Protected from the brutalities of the Revolution, she is unaware of her beloved father's identity as a leading politician. Fleurette's mother is never mentioned, except for the implication that she was not involved in her daughter's upbringing within Fleurette's memory. Chauvelin's exact marital status, and whether or not he has other children, is unknown.

Chauvelin is also depicted more sympathetically in the 1999 TV series; in that series, Martin Shaw portrays Chauvelin (therein with the first name Paul) as having some sense of sympathy and decency. Chauvelin and the Pimpernel are even shown as having some respect and admiration for each other, though not quite a friendship. However, in the 1982 television film, Chauvelin (played by Ian McKellen) appears to be deeply in love with Marguerite, but in an egotistical, controlling way; furthermore, he is so ruthlessly ambitious and vengeful that he turns on Marguerite when he realizes that her love and loyalty is to Sir Percy.

== Inspiration ==
Orczy's depiction is loosely based on Bernard-François, marquis de Chauvelin, a notable political figure in revolutionary France. Although there are some similarities between the real and fictional Chauvelins, Orczy's depiction of Chauvelin's career, personality and history is highly distorted. The historical Chauvelin was in fact a notable military officer who served with Rochambeau in the American Revolution, and as assistant ambassador to Britain in the time period depicted. The real Chauvelin was never a member or an agent of the Committee of Public Safety, and survived Thermidor.
