= A Sheaf of Bluebells =

1917 novel by Baroness Orczy

- First edition
- Author: Baroness Orczy
- Language: English
- Genre: Historical novel
- Publisher: Hutchinson & Co
- Publication date: 1917
- Publication place: United Kingdom
- Media type: Print (Hardback & Paperback)
- Pages: 348 pp

A Sheaf of Bluebells is a novel by Baroness Orczy about the feuds between Royalists and the followers of Napoleon Bonaparte. It was first published in 1917, and turned into a play The Legion of Honour by Orczy in 1918.

== Plot summary ==
Many French aristocrats exiled during the revolution have been presenting petitions to enable them to return to France under the conditional amnesty granted to them by the newly crowned Emperor.

Amongst them are a petition signed by Mme.la Marquise de Mortain and her son, Laurent (aged twenty-one years), and one signed by M. le Comte de Courson for himself and his daughter, Fernande.

Fernande is Laurent's cousin and is promised in marriage to him

Napoleon, in a lenient mood, grants their return and allows them to retake possession of their chateaux and any remaining land that had not been sold by the State.

Mme la Marquise, however, has an older son from a previous marriage still resident in France, Ronnay de Maurel was only four years old when his father died, but an uncle brought him up. This uncle, Gaston de Maurel is republican patriot with nothing of the aristo about him. Gaston eats peas with his knife and wears sabots and a blouse... he even voted for the death of the king.

Ronnay works in the foundries, where he employs five thousand men, and as a result he is now one of the richest men in France. Yet despite their fortune, he and his uncle live like peasants, using only a couple of rooms in the sumptuous chateau that is now being returned to his mother.

Mme. la Marquise disagrees with her elder son because he is a follower of the Bonaparte and denotes a bourgeois in his upbringing, manners, and dress.

Fernande also starts off by hating and despising Ronnay, but she soon hatches a plan to make him fall for her so she can win him over to the Royalist party. To this end, she plans to bump into him in the woods and conveniently sprains her ankle just before the time she knows he will pass.

"She had only just time to arrange her gown in its most becoming folds to decide on the exact position of the sheaf of bluebells and of her outstretched arm, and to assure herself that the sunlight was indeed playing with her hair and with her toes in just the manner she desired. Then she closed her eyes and waited."

She waits until he is right in front of her before opening her eyes, gazing into his and pleading for his help. Unused to such ploys, he gazes around helplessly, as if expecting the dwellers of the forest to help him in his awful dilemma.

But there is no one around, and Fernande pleads for help.

Ronnay gives in and carries Fernande home. As per her plan he loses his heart completely on the journey, but rather unexpectedly, Fernande ends up also falling victim to the passion that she sought to arouse in Ronnay, in spite of her hatred of the cause for which he is fighting.

The news that the hated Ronnay has become the lover of the woman promised to her adored younger son, Laurent, only causes Mme. La Marquise to loathe him more. She plots and schemes for the undoing of her hated elder son, but Fernande discovers the plot and saves Ronnay from being treacherously murdered.

Laurent goes through tortures of passionate jealousy and deserts from his regiment at a great crisis in order to assure himself of Fernande's feelings. Following which his mother furiously disowns him, accusing him of dishonour, while his father and kindred are fighting for France.

Poor Laurent eventually retrieves his dishonour only to die a hero's death, conveniently leaving Fernande free to marry Ronnay.
