= The Divine Folly =

1937 novel by Baroness Orczy

- First edition cover
- Author: Baroness Orczy
- Language: English
- Genre: Historical novel
- Publisher: Hodder & Stoughton
- Publication date: 1937
- Publication place: United Kingdom
- Media type: Print (Hardback & Paperback)

The Divine Folly is a novel by Baroness Orczy, creator of the Scarlet Pimpernel.

== Plot introduction ==
Two English brothers travel across Europe as members of a secret society that is plotting the assassination of Napoleon III.
