= The Uncrowned King =

- First edition (publ. Hodder & Stoughton)
- Author: Emmuska Orczy
- Language: English
- Publication date: 1935

The Uncrowned King is a 1935 British historical novel by the Anglo-Hungarian writer Baroness Emmuska Orczy, best known as the creator of the Scarlet Pimpernel.
