= Nicolette (novel) =

Novel by Baroness Orczy

Nicolette: A tale of old Provence
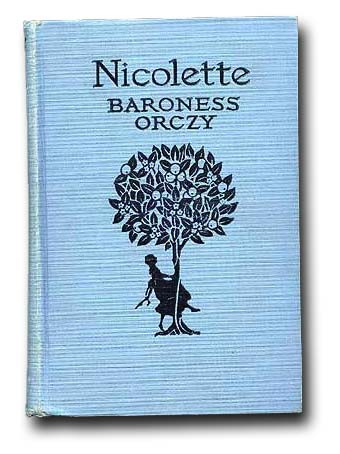
- First US edition
- Author: Baroness Orczy
- Language: English
- Genre: Adventure, Historical novel
- Publication date: 1922
- Publication place: United Kingdom
- Media type: Print (Hardback & Paperback)

Nicolette is a 1922 novel written by Baroness Orczy. It is a coming-of-age story involving a girl’s love for her childhood sweetheart and her patient winning of him from the clutches of a wicked vixen.
