= Petticoat Government =

- Author: Baroness Orczy
- Language: English
- Genre: Historical novel
- Publisher: Hutchinson & Co
- Publication date: 1910
- Publication place: United Kingdom
- Media type: Print (hardback & paperback)
- Pages: 288 pp

Petticoat Government was written by Baroness Orczy, author of The Scarlet Pimpernel, in 1910. It was released under the title Petticoat Rule in the U.S. in the same year. The book had previously been released in 1909 as A Ruler of Princes, in a limited edition.

A story of the French aristocracy, the book concerns Madame de Pompadour's influence over the King and France. The story focuses on young heroine Lydie D'Aumont, who is caught between two suitors: hot-headed childhood friend Gaston de Stainville, and a more reserved English lord, Henry Dewhyrst, Marquis of Eglinton. The novel bears some similarities with its predecessor, "The Scarlet Pimpernel," and it is possible that the hero shares some relation with a character from that novel, Lord Antony Dewhurst.
