= A Bride of the Plains =

1915 book by Emma Orczy

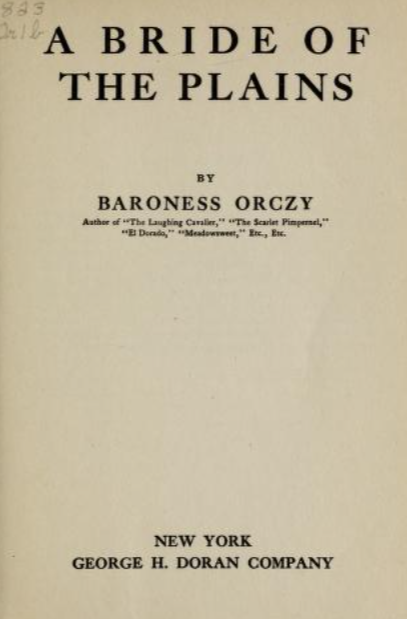
- Title page for A Bride of the Plains (1915)
- Author: Baroness Orczy
- Language: English
- Genre: Historical novel
- Published: 1915 (George H. Doran Company)
- Publication place: United Kingdom
- Media type: Print (Hardback)

A Bride of the Plains is a historical novel written in 1915 by Baroness Orczy, the author of The Scarlet Pimpernel series. It is set in Hungary, and is dedicated to the memory of Lajos Kossuth. It was positively received, with praise for its "picturesque" narrative.

== Plot summary ==
The story is set in Hungary and the scene is laid in a village close to the Maros.
