= The Honourable Jim =

1924 novel by Baroness Orczy

- Cover of the 1924 US first edition
- Author: Baroness Orczy
- Language: English
- Genre: Historical novel
- Publisher: Hodder & Stoughton
- Publication date: 1924
- Publication place: United Kingdom
- Media type: Print (Hardback)
- Pages: 320 pp

The Honourable Jim is an historical novel by Baroness Orczy and can be thought of as The Scarlet Pimpernel of England.
