= The Emperor's Candlesticks =

1899 novel by Baroness Orczy

- First edition
- Author: Baroness Orczy
- Language: English
- Genre: Adventure, Historical novel
- Publisher: C. Arthur Pearson
- Publication date: 1899
- Publication place: United Kingdom
- Media type: Print (Hardback)

The Emperor's Candlesticks is an 1899 historical novel by Baroness Orczy. Written soon after the birth of her son John, it was her first book as an author rather than translator and was a commercial failure. As in the Scarlet Pimpernel, the theme is international intrigue, but this time the setting is pre-World War I Europe and Russia rather than Revolutionary France.

Baroness Orczy first submitted "The Emperor's Candlesticks" for publication in a magazine, but it was rejected as "too long for a short story and too short for a novel".

== Plot introduction ==
When a group of Russian anarchists kidnap a Russian prince in Vienna there are repercussions. On learning that the Cardinal d'Orsay has agreed to convey some hollow candlesticks from the Emperor to the Princess Marionoff in St Petersburg, two spies both see the possibility of using them to convey messages safely into Russia.

One is an eager young idealist involved in the plot against the prince, the other is Madame Demidoff, a beautiful agent of the Tsar.

When the candlesticks go missing at the border, the two engage in a race to get them back, both realizing that their very lives could depend on the retrieval.

== Adaptations ==
Two film adaptations were made:

- The Emperor's Candlesticks (Die Leuchter des Kaisers), a 1936 Austrian production by Karl Hartl, starring Sybille Schmitz and Karl Ludwig Diehl.
- The Emperor's Candlesticks, in 1937, starring William Powell and Luise Rainer.
