= The Enchanted Cat =

1895 Hungarian novel translated by Baroness Orczy

- 1895 1st edition
- Translator: Baroness Orczy
- Language: English
- Genre: Adventure, Historical novel
- Publisher: Dean and Wolf
- Publication date: 1895
- Publication place: United Kingdom
- Media type: Print (Hardback & Paperback)

The Enchanted Cat was a Hungarian folklore tale translated and edited from Hungarian in 1895 by Baroness Orczy, best known for authoring the Scarlet Pimpernel series. The book was illustrated by her husband, Montagu Barstow, whom she married in 1894.

== Plot ==
Set in a far-off Eastern land, near the borders of Persia, the story is of a kingdom ruled by the kind-hearted Sultan Abu Hafiz. Ever since the death of his beloved wife, the beautiful Sultana Arizade, the Sultan had never smiled again. His ministers worried about his health and happiness, so his Grand Vizier, Ben Achmed, persuaded him to remarry. Reluctantly, Sultan Abu Hafiz agreed, and he married a widowed princess renowned for her wisdom, wealth, and beauty.

The new Sultana and her son from a previous marriage, Ben Haroun, were received warmly in the kingdom. But soon she and her son grew jealous of Prince Al Hafiz, the Sultan’s heir from his first marriage, who was beloved among the people and in court. Secretly, they plotted to eliminate the prince, aiming to secure the throne for Ben Haroun.

When the aging Sultan announced his decision to abdicate in favor of Prince Al Hafiz, who was soon to marry a princess, the Sultana visited Abraduz, a powerful magician from her homeland. Although the magician refused to kill the prince directly, he offered them a magic potion that, when placed upon the prince’s threshold, would transform him into a black cat upon contact. However, on every new moon, the prince would regain human form for six hours.

The Sultana executed the plan, sneaking to the prince’s chambers at night and pouring the potion at his door. The following morning, the palace awoke in confusion—Prince Al Hafiz had vanished without a trace, leaving his father and bride-to-be heartbroken. Meanwhile, a mysterious black Angora cat appeared in the palace and became the grief-stricken Sultan’s beloved companion.

The Sultana knew the cat’s true identity and plotted to destroy it before the new moon, fearful the prince might regain his human form. Her attempts repeatedly failed. In one attempt, she threw the cat in the lake where it was saved by Prince Al Hafiz’s bride-to-be, who was bathing with her attendants.

The Sultana and Ben Haroun devised a plan on the night of the next new moon. They captured the cat, bound it with a heavy stone, and prepared to drown him in the lake. As soon ast Ben Haroun raised his hands to cast the cat into the water, the crescent moon appeared, breaking the magician’s spell. Prince Al Hafiz regained his human form instantly and overcame his stepbrother. The terrified Sultana fled.

When Sultan Abu Hafiz learned of the treachery, he was enraged. He banished the Sultana and Ben Haroun from his kingdom forever. The magician Abraduz faced execution. The Sultan celebrated the marriage of Prince Al Hafiz and his beloved princess, bringing happiness and peace to the realm. Sultan Abu Hafiz, Prince Al Hafiz, and his bride lived happily and prosperously.
