= Lady Molly of Scotland Yard =

Short story collection by Emma Orczy

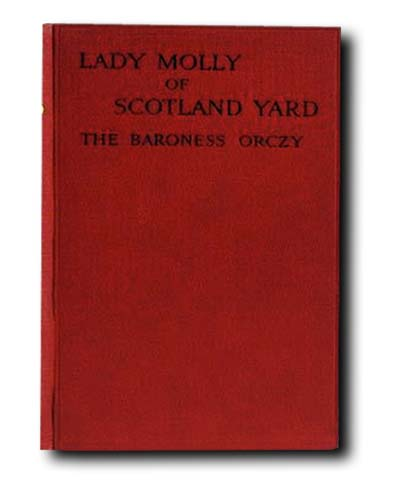
- Cover of the 1910 1st edition
- Author: Baroness Orczy
- Language: English
- Published: 1910 Cassell & Co
- Publication place: United Kingdom
- Pages: 344
- Text: Lady Molly of Scotland Yard at Wikisource

Lady Molly of Scotland Yard is a collection of short stories about Molly Robertson-Kirk, an early fictional female detective. It was written by Baroness Orczy, who is best known as the creator of The Scarlet Pimpernel, but who also invented several turn-of-the-century detectives including The Old Man in the Corner.

The book was first published in 1910 and soon became very popular, with three editions appearing in the first year. As well as being one of the first novels to feature a female detective as the main character, Orczy's outstandingly successful police officer preceded her real life female counterparts by a decade.

Lady Molly, like her fictional contemporaries, most often succeeded because she recognised domestic clues foreign to male experience. Her entry into the police is motivated by a desire to save her fiancé from a false accusation. Once her superior intuition has triumphed, Lady Molly marries and leaves the force.

== Overview ==
The book contains all twelve Lady Molly adventures and is narrated by Lady Molly's assistant Mary Granard.

== Stories ==
=== The Ninescore Mystery ===
Lady Molly is in a state of agitation. The chief is finally allowing her to get involved with the Ninescore murder case, unheard of for a member of the 'female department'.

The murder of Mary Nicholls was committed at Ash Court, a mansion in the village of Ninescore. On 5 February her body had been found in an advanced state of decomposition. She was lying in mud at the edge of a pond in the grounds, her head arms and shoulders under water. The body was unrecognisable but her dress, ring and purse established the victim as Mary Nicholls, who lived with her sister Susan opposite Ash Court. The two sisters had not been seen since 23 January and the medical officer confirmed that Mary had been dead for at least 12 days.

The sisters appeared to have plenty of money, but did not get on well together and had been fighting about Lionel Lydgate, who had been linked to Mary, even though he was engaged to someone else. Mary seemed not to care about scandal and there were already ugly rumours surrounding a baby girl she had left with Mrs Williams, a local widow, claiming the baby was her orphaned niece.

On the night of her disappearance, Mary had gone to visit the child in a state of excitement, telling Mrs Williams that she was going to London by train. No more had been seen or heard of her, except a report from a local carter that, while walking along Ninescore lane, he had heard a man talking to Mary on the night she was last seen.

Lady Molly and her assistant head to Ninescore, at the police station they are filled in by Inspector Meisures, who produces a document found in Mary's purse. The note is a series of dates and hours which seemed to relate to times when Lydgate had been to visit her. Cited by the police, Lydgate turns up to give evidence at the inquest. Telling the court that he found Mary "pretty and amusing" and felt sorry for her because everyone had turned against her. He insists that the last time he met Mary was 1 January, swearing that he was in Lincolnshire on the 23rd, and has plenty of witnesses to prove it.

With Lydgate off the hook, the question remains, who had killed Mary and where was her sister Susan?

Lady Molly writes a couple of telegrams and insists on sending them from Canterbury. They stay overnight and the next morning Lady Molly points out a bogus article that in the evening paper that says Mary Nicholls' baby is dying – this was the reason for the telegram. The next thing there is a knock at the door – it is telegram from Ninescore stating that Mary has been arrested in Ninescore.

Lady Molly talks to the distraught woman and tells her she is going to be charged for the murder of her sister Susan. She insists that 'it wasn't me', confirming that she knows her sister is dead. Lady Molly tells her the baby will be sent to a workhouse, and she eventually confesses all.

The baby's father is Lord Edbrooke, who had taken on his brother's identity, Mr Lionel Lydgate, when in Ninescore. Susan had found this out and was blackmailing him without Mary's knowledge. Having arranged a meeting, Susan had put on Mary's clothes and gone to meet him, ending in her murder. Lord Edbrooke had immediately confessed all to Mary and persuaded her to leave Ninescore to protect him. Mary had then disappeared and Lord Edbrooke had returned to his castle, and the real Lionel Lydgate had refused to betray his brother at the inquest.

=== The Frewin Miniatures ===
Lady Molly's methods in Ninescore mystery though not altogether approved of at Scotland Yard have earned her a place in the foremost rank of the force. As a result, when the case of the Frewin miniatures comes up, the chief immediately offers the job to her.

The original owner of the missing Englehearts, Mr Frewin, died recently following a serious illness, leaving behind his wife and son Lionel. After getting into debt, Lionel had been bailed out by his wealthy father on condition that he started a new life in Canada. Frewin saw his son's behaviour as a slur on the family name and had openly told him that all the Frewin money and the priceless art collection would be left by will to a nephew, James Hyam, whose honour and general conduct had always been beyond reproach.

Prior to his death the Louvre had offered him a considerable amount of money for his treasures, but having no want of money, he had refused. On his death bed, after looking at his beloved miniatures, Frewin appeared to relent and agreed to see his son, who was staying in Brighton. However, despite Mrs Frewin's best attempts, her son was even more stubborn than his father and refused. Mr Frewin died early the next morning and it is the following afternoon before Mrs Frewin realises that the miniatures have disappeared from the library.

Alerted to the theft, the Brighton police arrive at the house and soon decide that the thief must have got in while the butler was seeing Mrs Frewin to her car. The maid reported finding one of the library windows open when she had gone in to clean it the following morning, so it looked likely that the thief had been locked in the library. Mrs Frewin confirmed that her son has been staying at the Metropole hotel and had been dining with her sister the night before. So although public opinion is against him, it is impossible to link Lionel to the crime.

Lady Molly takes the case on the insistence that the chief writes to every museum and art collector asking for details of purchases for the last couple of years. When the results come back, she finds out that the Budapest museum owns eight Engleheart miniatures which they bought two years ago.

Soon after Lady Molly and Mary are having afternoon tea at the Hotel Metropole. The Steynes and the Frewins are at a nearby table. Lady Molly is soon joined by some friends including Sir Anthony Truscott, one of the keepers of the Art Department at South Kensington Museum. To Mary's amazement, Lady Molly announces that she is mad about miniatures and has just brought two Engleheart miniatures from Budapest and gives Mary her room key, asking her to retrieve the miniatures from her room, so she can show them to Sir Anthony.

This show secures the attention of Mrs Frewin, who follows Mary to the room and offers her £200 to see the contents of the package. Lady Molly however is not far behind and confronting Mrs Frewin opens the package to show some blank pieces of cardboard. Mrs Frewin accuses her of trickery but Lady Molly insists that she now knows the truth.

Mrs Frewin, an accomplished artist in her own right, had copied the miniatures after her husband's first seizure had impaired his mind and eyesight. She had then sold the originals to the Budapest museum and given the money to her son. However, on his death she had realised that with the art works due to pass to her nephew, they would have to be valued for probate. She had then engineered the fake theft to cover her tracks.

Lady Molly assures the widow that as long as she gives Scotland yard a confession, they will be content not to take matters any further, and suggests that Mrs Frewin can probably come to an amicable agreement with James Hyam on compensation.

=== The Irish-Tweed Coat ===
A young man is implicated in a murder. Desperate to prove his son's innocence, the worried father notices the strange behaviour of one of his fiancée's boarders. He discovers evidence that a Sicilian gang is involved. Lady Molly must rush to Italy with the evidence before the gang catches her.

== Adaptation ==
The Woman in the Big Hat was adapted for the anthology TV series The Rivals of Sherlock Holmes, with Elvi Hale starring as Lady Molly.
