= A Son of the People =

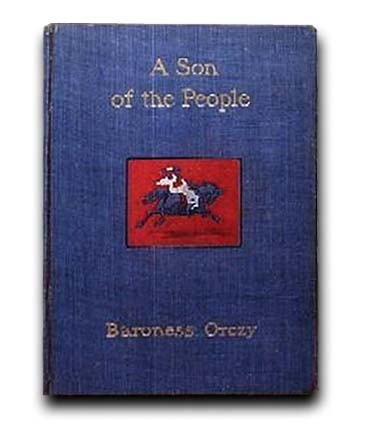
- Cover of the 1st United Kingdom edition (January 1906)
- Author: Baroness Orczy
- Language: English
- Genre: Historical novel
- Publisher: Greening & Co.
- Publication date: January 1906
- Publication place: United Kingdom
- Media type: Print (hardback & paperback)

A Son of the People: A Romance of the Hungarian Plains, a book by Baroness Orczy, is set in her native Hungary. Orczy used scenes from her own childhood when writing, describing the house in Tarna-Örs in which she born and the life of the territorial magnates of Hungary with which she had been familiar.

Orczy claims in her autobiography that the love story woven into the plot actually occurred in the next village to Tarna-Örs, and the daughter of the territorial noble who owned that property did actually marry a highly educated and rich peasant who had fallen desperately in love with her.

Her father had been brought to financial disaster through the same agrarian troubles that had nearly ruined Orczy's own father, and he gave a reluctant consent to the incongruous marriage.

The book was first published in January 1906 in the United Kingdom by Greening & Co., and in the same year in the United States by G. P. Putnam's Sons.
