= A True Woman =

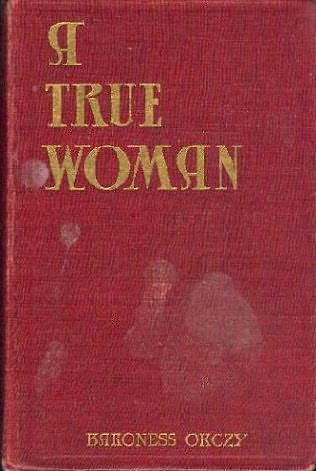
- Author: Baroness Orczy
- Language: English
- Genre: Historical novel
- Publisher: Hutchinson & Co
- Publication date: 1911
- Publication place: United Kingdom
- Media type: Print (hardback & paperback)
- Pages: 351 pp

A True Woman (US Title The Heart of a Woman), was written by Baroness Orczy (best known for The Scarlet Pimpernel series) and was first published in 1911.

== Plot summary ==
The main character in the book is Louise Harris, a plain but content young woman who leads a life of prosy luxury. Louise gets up every morning and eats a copious breakfast, she walks the dogs, hunts in the autumn, and skates in the winter, just like hundreds of other well-born, well-bred English girls of average means.

Loo is an altogether nice person, and so it is that Luke de Mountford, who knows a good thing when he sees it, asks her to be his wife. Luke is heir to his uncle, Lord Radcliffe and therefore deemed a satisfactory match for Louise.

However, just when everything seems to be going well, another nephew with a claim to his uncle’s fortune turns up unexpectedly. Luke is forced to reveal to Louise that their financial future may not be as guaranteed as he had hoped.

Faced with the situation, Luke considers setting up an Ostrich farm in Africa to make a living, but he can’t bring himself to commit Loo to that lifestyle, as she is modern and dainty.

When the intruder, Philip de Mountford, is discovered stabbed in a cab, suspicion naturally falls on Luke who certainly has a motive for murder. The head of the Criminal Investigation Department, who happens to be Louisa’s uncle, reveals his evidence before the ensuing trial and allows Colonel Harris to conceal himself in his office while a witness for the prosecution details the points of the evidence he will give at the trial. He also reveals that he intends to allow Luke time to escape should the verdict at the inquest be against him.

But Luke is, notwithstanding, tried for his life, and before his arrest he faces Louise once again.

"It was a supreme farewell, and she knew it. She felt it in the quiver of agony which went through him as he pressed her so close that her breath nearly left her body, and her heart seemed to stand still. She felt it in the sweet sad pain of the burning kisses with which he covered her face, her eyes, her hair, her mouth.

His face was just a mask, marble-like and impassive, jealously guarding the secrets of the soul within.Just a good-looking, well-bred young Englishman, in fact, who looked in his elegant attire ready to start off on some social function."
