= By the Gods Beloved =

1905 novel by Emma Orczy

By The Gods Beloved
- Cover of the 1907 5th edition
- Author: Baroness Orczy
- Language: English
- Genre: Adventure novel
- Publisher: Greening & Co
- Publication date: 1905
- Publication place: United Kingdom
- Media type: Print (hardback)

By The Gods Beloved, first published in the UK in 1905, was a novel by Baroness Orczy. It was released under the title The Gates of Kamt in the US. The novel is in the tradition of Rider Haggard's 1887 She, and concerns a lost race of ancient Egyptians.

In her autobiography, Links in the Chains of Life, Orczy comments:

"The book that gave me more pleasure to write than any of the others is By the Gods Beloved, not only because I could allow my imagination to go roaming in hitherto unexplored realms but because I could give it full sway in picturesque descriptions of places that did not really exist, and in people and characters who could have no attributes that were entirely normal and modern."

== Contents ==
- Part I – The Gates of Kamt
- Part II – Men-ne-fer
- Part III – The Palace of Neit-Akrit
- Part IV – Tanis

== Plot summary ==
Background

Hugh, an archaeologist, discovers a parchment revealing the existence of a lost civilization driven from Egypt. He convinces his friend Mark, a doctor, to join him on an expedition to find the hidden city. After a perilous journey through the Libyan desert, they find the city but are denied entry.

Kamt

Some days later the opportunity arises and they sneak into Kamt to find themselves in the middle of a massive temple. Hiding in the background they watch an ornate ceremony take place in the middle of which is a living breathing Pharaoh, his mother, Queen Maat-kha, and the High Priest Ur-tasen. Eavesdropping on the Queen and the Priest, they discover that the Pharaoh is very ill and if he dies his throne will pass to his cousin Princess Neit-akrit, as Maat-kha cannot remain as queen if she has no son or husband to accompany her on the throne.

The Princess

It soon becomes obvious that Princess Neit-akrit has her detractors, for her beauty causes madness in men and jealousy in women. Even the Queen is not immune, and asks Hugh to force the Princess to become a Priestess of Ra, hoping that once she has been blinded and rendered harmless, she will no longer be a threat.

Tanis

In Tanis, the Pharaoh reveals to the Queen that Hugh loves Princess Neit-akrit, leading the Queen to murder him. The High Priest, Ur-tasen, manipulates Neit-akrit, forcing her to choose between saving Hugh and losing her crown. Mark tries to find Hugh and warn him, but drugged by the priests.

The Marriage

Mark, drugged and unable to warn Hugh, witnesses Hugh being manipulated by Princess Neit-akrit. After escaping, Mark informs Hugh of the plot, leading to a confrontation with Ur-tasen who demands Neit-akrit’s exile to preserve her honor.

The Departure

Hugh and Mark agree to leave Kamt with supplies and oxen, accompanied by Ur-tasen to the Rock of Anubis. Years later, Hugh keeps a sprig of rosemary as a reminder of their adventures.
