= Fairyland's Beauty =

Hungarian fantasy novel

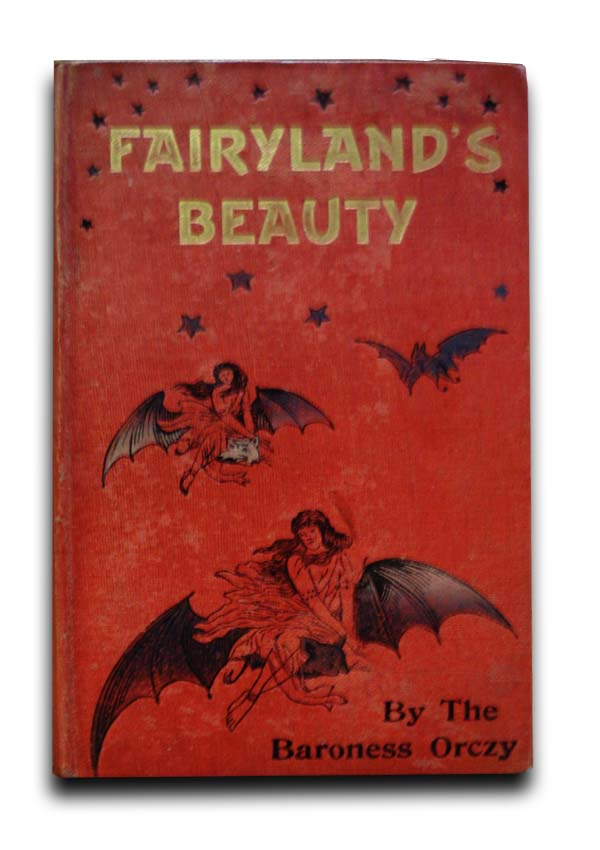
- 1895 1st edition
- Translator: Baroness Orczy
- Language: English
- Publisher: Dean and Wolf
- Publication date: 1895
- Publication place: United Kingdom

Fairyland's Beauty aka The Suitors of Princess Fire-Fly, was edited and translated from the Hungarian by Baroness Orczy (creator of The Scarlet Pimpernel series), in 1895.

The book was illustrated by her husband, Montagu Barstow, whom she married in 1894.
