= The Bronze Eagle =

- First edition cover
- Author: Baroness Orczy
- Language: English
- Genre: Adventure, Historical novel
- Publisher: Hodder & Stoughton
- Publication date: 1915
- Publication place: United Kingdom
- Media type: Print (Hardback & Paperback)

Written by Baroness Orczy and first published in 1915, The Bronze Eagle: A Story of the Hundred Days, is a romance set in France following the period of the Revolution and the expulsion of the Bourbons. Its central plot lies in the intrigues of their followers and those of Napoleon Bonaparte.

The novel was also published serially under the title of Waterloo.

== Plot summary ==
Crystal, the only daughter of the old, long-exiled haughty royalist, the Comte de Cambray, is on the eve of betrothal to de Marmont, (secretly an ardent Bonapartist).

Bobby Clyffurde, the Englishman, who is in love with Crystal, confronts Victor de Marmont about why he is pretending to be a royalist. De Marmont replies that he has never led the Comte to suppose anything, the Comte has merely taken de Marmont’s political convictions for granted.

As if two potential suitors weren’t enough, Crystal has yet another admirer, Maurice de St. Genis, whose impecunious state (her father sees him as a penniless, out-at-elbows, good for nothing) has precluded him from obtaining her hand in marriage.

However, at the moment of Crystal’s betrothal to de Marmont, Maurice finally gets his revenge upon his rival. Once the guests have assembled for the ceremony, there is a disturbance from the end of the corridor and St. Genis enters the room, his rough clothes and muddy boots providing a contrast to the immaculate get-up of the Comte’s guests. Looking flushed and clutching his cane, he announces that he has only come to avert the awful catastrophe that is about to fall on the Comte and his family.

At the young man’s ominous words, M. le Comte goes pale and demands to know what catastrophe could be worse than twenty years of exile?

"An alliance with a traitor, M. le Comte" he replies.

St. Genis goes on to accuse his rival of pinning Napoleon’s proclamation on the walls of Grenoble. Yet, rather than deny the accusation, de Marmont defends his actions with fervor, pulling a copy of the declaration from his pocket and waving it at the assembled group while shouting “Vive l’Empereur”.

Despite the sudden rupture of her engagement, Crystal's heart is by no means broken, but it is not St. Genis who in the end wins her love, for we are left with the understanding that it is Clyffurde, the English merchant who eventually overrides the prejudices of the old French count.

Clyffurde laughingly asks Crystal’s aunt, Mme. la Duchesse “Do you think that if I promise never to buy or sell gloves again, but in future to try and live like a gentleman-he will consent?”
