= The Triumph of the Scarlet Pimpernel =

- 1922 First Edition
- Author: Baroness Orczy
- Language: English
- Series: The Scarlet Pimpernel
- Genre: Adventure, Historical novel
- Publisher: Hodder & Stoughton
- Publication date: 1922
- Publication place: United Kingdom
- Media type: Print (Hardback & Paperback)
- Pages: 320
- Preceded by: Adventures of the Scarlet Pimpernel
- Followed by: A Child of the Revolution

The Triumph of the Scarlet Pimpernel, first published in 1922, is a book in the series about the Scarlet Pimpernel's adventures by Baroness Orczy. Again Orczy interweaves historic fact with fiction, this time through the real-life figures of Thérésa Cabarrus and Jean-Lambert Tallien, inserting the Scarlet Pimpernel as an instigator of the role Tallien played in the Thermidorian Reaction of July 1794.

== Plot summary ==
The story starts in Paris in April 1794, year II of the French Revolution. Theresia Cabarrus is a beautiful but shallow Spaniard who is betrothed to Citizen Tallien the popular Representative in the Convention and one of Robespierre's inner circle. She is credited with exercising a mellowing influence over Tallien, whom she met in Bordeaux but although she is engaged to be married to him, what little love she has appears to be lavished on another.

Bertrand Moncrif is a good-looking but impulsive young man who appears determined to martyr himself in opposition to the revolutionary government. To this end, he has gathered the siblings of his long-term sweetheart, Régine de Serval, into his plan to denounce Robespierre at one of the Fraternal suppers. Despite warnings from Régine he insists on carrying through his plans which inevitably go awry and the wrath of the mob is soon turned towards the small group. After a timely intervention on the part of the Scarlet Pimpernel, using the guise of the coal heaver Rateau (who also appears in several short stories in The League of the Scarlet Pimpernel - The Cabaret de la Liberté, Needs Must and A Battle of Wits), the de Servals are saved from a lynching while Moncrif lies unconscious and unseen under a table.

In England, Moncrif and the de Servals are finally free to resume an almost normal life. Theresia arrives at Dover dressed in men's clothes and claiming she has been driven out of France by her association with Bertrand, in fear of her life. An obviously staged row between the Spaniard and Chauvelin outside Sir Percy's cottage fails to persuade our hero that she is up to anything but mischief, but he seems to relish the prospect of such an intelligent and wily adversary and promises not to reveal her true identity to anyone for he "is a lover of sport."

With her plans to seduce Percy scuppered, Theresia turns her attention to Sir Percy's wife Marguerite and uses an all too willing Bertrand to set the trap. Lady Blakeney is kidnapped yet again and taken to France and imprisoned as bait for Sir Percy.
