= The Emperor's Candlesticks (1936 film) =

- Directed by: Karl Hartl
- Written by: Karl Hartl; Friedrich Schreyvogel
- Based on: The Emperor's Candlesticks; 1899 novel by Baroness Emmuska Orczy
- Starring: Sybille Schmitz; Karl Ludwig Diehl; Friedl Czepa
- Cinematography: Werner Brandes; Karl Drömmer; Anton Pucher
- Edited by: Karl Hartl; René Métain
- Music by: Willy Schmidt-Gentner
- Production company: Gloria Film
- Distributed by: Kiba Kinobetriebsanstalt
- Release date: 14 February 1936
- Running time: 90 minutes
- Country: Austria
- Language: German

The Emperor's Candlesticks (German: Die Leuchter des Kaisers) is a 1936 Austrian historical adventure film directed by Karl Hartl and starring Sybille Schmitz, Karl Ludwig Diehl and Friedl Czepa. It is an adaptation of Baroness Orczy's 1899 novel The Emperor's Candlesticks. A Hollywood film version of the story The Emperor's Candlesticks was released the following year.

It was shot at Sascha Film's Sievering Studios and Rosenhügel Studios in Vienna. The film's sets were designed by the art directors Kurt Herlth, Werner Schlichting and Emil Stepanek. It premiered at the Gloria-Palast in Berlin, and a month later in Vienna.

== Cast ==
- Sybille Schmitz as Anna Demidow
- Karl Ludwig Diehl as Georg Wolenski
- Friedl Czepa as Maria
- Inge List as Zofe bei Anna Demidow
- Anton Edthofer as Erzherzog Ludwig
- Max Gülstorff as Graf Surowkin
- Johannes Heesters as Grossfürst Peter Alexandrowitsch
- Fritz Rasp as Stanislaus
- Heinrich Schroth as Der Führer der Verschworenen
- Jane Tilden as Ein Stubenmädchen
- Hans Unterkircher
- Fritz Imhoff
- Reinhold Häussermann
- Hans Siebert
- Babette Devrient
- Wilhelm Schich
- Dora Seifert
- Otto Storm
- Robert Valberg
- Kurt von Lessen

== Reception ==
Writing for The Spectator in 1936, Graham Greene gave the film a mildly good review, summarizing the audience experience as "good direction, fair acting, and the attractively Baker Street dresses make this a pleasant film to doze at."

== Bibliography ==
- Bock, Hans-Michael & Bergfelder, Tim. The Concise Cinegraph: Encyclopaedia of German Cinema. Berghahn Books, 2009.
- Von Dassanowsky, Robert. Screening Transcendence: Film Under Austrofascism and the Hollywood Hope, 1933-1938. Indiana University Press, 2018
