= A Child of the Revolution =

Novel by Baroness Orczy

- Cover of the 1932 first edition
- Author: Baroness Orczy
- Language: English
- Series: The Scarlet Pimpernel
- Genre: Adventure, Historical novel
- Published: 1932 (Doubleday)
- Publication place: United Kingdom
- Media type: Print (Hardback & Paperback)
- Pages: 307pp
- Preceded by: The Triumph of the Scarlet Pimpernel
- Followed by: Pimpernel and Rosemary

First published in 1932, A Child of the Revolution is a book in the Scarlet Pimpernel series written by Baroness Orczy. It is chronologically the last book in the series, and is the only Scarlet Pimpernel novel which was not translated into French.

== Plot ==
The story is framed by Sir Percy Blakeney, who recounts it to the Prince of Wales. Beginning in 1782, it tells of André Vallon, the hot-tempered son of a poor widow living on the domain of the haughty Duc de Marigny de Borne. As a boy, André is humiliated and beaten at the seigneur's command, and nurses a deep resentment of the aristocracy.

When the Revolution breaks out, André rises to prominence among the Jacobins. Returning home, he finds his mother dead and her cottage destroyed, and vows vengeance on the Marigny family. Rather than send them to the guillotine, he forces the Duc's daughter, Aurore de Marigny, to marry him, declaring that the marriage alone will keep her and her father safe from the vengeful villagers. Aurore at first hates him, but the two gradually come to love one another. Hoping to free his daughter from the union, the old seigneur denounces André to the revolutionary authorities, placing André's own life in danger.
