= Pimpernel and Rosemary =

1924 novel by Baroness Emmuska Orczy

- Cover of the 1924 First edition
- Author: Baroness Orczy
- Language: English
- Series: The Scarlet Pimpernel
- Genre: Adventure, Historical novel
- Publisher: Cassell & Co, London
- Publication date: 1924
- Publication place: United Kingdom
- Media type: Print (Hardback & Paperback)
- Pages: 343 pp
- Preceded by: A Child of the Revolution

Pimpernel and Rosemary is a novel by Baroness Emmuska Orczy, originally published in 1924. It is set after the First World War and features Peter Blakeney, a descendant of the Scarlet Pimpernel (Percy Blakeney).

The action is mainly set amongst the disaffected Hungarian nobility in Transylvania, allowing Orczy to draw on her knowledge of Hungarian history and politics.

== Plot summary ==
The novel is set in the early 1920s, after the First World War. Peter Blakeney is a celebrated cricketer and a holder of the Victoria Cross, and a descendant of Sir Percy Blakeney whom he closely resembles. He is in love with Rosemary Fowkes, a famous journalist who writes under the pen-name "Uno", but he has never quite declared himself; disappointed by his elusiveness, Rosemary agrees to marry his friend Jasper, Lord Tarkington.

When General Naniescu, the Romanian military governor of Transylvania, invites Rosemary to travel there and report candidly on conditions for the Hungarian minority under the post-war Romanian occupation, she accepts, bringing forward her wedding so that Jasper can accompany her. In Transylvania—a region Rosemary had often visited in childhood with Peter's Hungarian mother—Peter's young relatives are arrested for treason, and Rosemary is confronted with an agonising choice. Peter, who arrives in the country apparently working against his own family, is in fact secretly engineering their rescue, in the manner of his famous ancestor.
