= Baroness Orczy =

Hungarian-born British novelist and playwright (1865–1947)

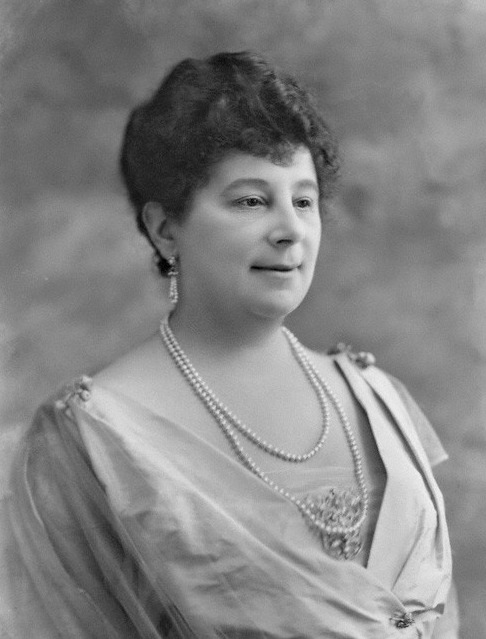
- Orczy in 1920
- Born: Emma Magdalena Rozália Mária Jozefa Borbála Orczy de Orci; 23 September 1865; Tarnaörs, Heves County, Hungary, Austrian Empire
- Died: 12 November 1947 (aged 82); Henley-on-Thames, Oxfordshire, England
- Occupation: Novelist
- Spouse: Henry George Montagu MacLean Barstow (m. 1894; died 1942)
- Children: John "Jack" Montague Orczy-Barstow
- Writing career
- Genres: Historical fiction, mystery fiction and adventure romances
- Notable works: The Scarlet Pimpernel; The Emperor's Candlesticks

Baroness Emma Magdalena Rozália Mária Jozefa Borbála Orczy de Orci (/ˈɔːrtsiː/; 23 September 1865 – 12 November 1947), usually known as Baroness Orczy (the name under which she was published), was a Hungarian-born British novelist and playwright. She is best known for her series of novels featuring The Scarlet Pimpernel, the alter ego of Sir Percy Blakeney, a wealthy English fop who turns into a quick-thinking escape artist in order to save French aristocrats from "Madame Guillotine" during the French Revolution, establishing the "hero with a secret identity" in popular culture.

Opening in London's West End on 5 January 1905, The Scarlet Pimpernel became a favourite of British audiences. Some of Orczy's paintings were exhibited at the Royal Academy in London.

She established the Women of England's Active Service League during World War I with the intention of empowering women to convince men to enlist in the military.

== Early life ==
Orczy was born in Tarnaörs, Hungary. She was the daughter of the composer Baron Félix Orczy de Orci (1835–1892) and Countess Emma Wass de Szentegyed et Cege (1839–1892). Her paternal grandfather, Baron László Orczy (1787–1880), was a royal councillor, and knight of the Sacred Military Constantinian Order of Saint George; her paternal grandmother, Baroness Magdolna, born Magdolna Müller (1811–1879), was of Austrian origin. Her maternal grandparents were the Count Sámuel Wass de Szentegyed et Cege (1815–1879), member of the Hungarian parliament, and Rozália Eperjessy de Károlyfejérvár (1814–1884).

Orczy's parents left their estate for Budapest in 1868, fearful of the threat of a peasant revolution. They lived in Budapest, Brussels, and Paris, where she studied music unsuccessfully. In 1880, at age 14, Emma and her family moved to London, England where they lodged with fellow Hungarian expatriate Francis Pichler at 162 Great Portland Street. Orczy attended West London School of Art and then the Heatherley School of Fine Art.

At art school she met illustrator Henry George Montagu MacLean Barstow, the son of an English clergyman; they were married at St Marylebone parish church on 7 November 1894. It was the start of what she described as a joyful and happy marriage, "for close on half a century, one of perfect happiness and understanding, of perfect friendship and communion of thought."

== Writing career ==
They had very little money and Orczy started to work with her husband as a translator and an illustrator to supplement his meager earnings. John Montague Orczy-Barstow, their only child, was born on 25 February 1899 (died 1969). She started writing soon after his birth, but her first novel, The Emperor's Candlesticks (1899), was a failure. She did, however, find a small following with a series of detective stories in the Royal Magazine. Her next novel, In Mary's Reign (1901), did better.

In 1903, she and her husband wrote The Scarlet Pimpernel, a play based on one of her short stories about an English aristocrat, Sir Percy Blakeney, Bart., who rescued French aristocrats from the French Revolution. She had conceived the character while standing on a platform on the London Underground. She submitted her novelisation of the story under the same title to 12 publishers. While the couple waited for the decisions of these publishers, Fred Terry and Julia Neilson accepted the play for production in London's West End. Initially, it drew small audiences, but the play ran for four years in London, and broke many stage records, eventually playing more than 2,000 performances and becoming one of the most popular shows staged in Britain. It was translated and produced in other countries and underwent several revivals. This theatrical success generated huge sales for the novel. The couple moved to Thanet, Kent.

Introducing the notion of a "hero with a secret identity" into popular culture, the Scarlet Pimpernel exhibits characteristics that would become superhero conventions, including the penchant for disguise, use of a signature weapon (sword), ability to out-think and outwit his adversaries, and a calling card (he leaves behind a scarlet pimpernel at each of his interventions). By drawing attention to his alter ego, Blakeney hides behind his public face as a slow-thinking, foppish playboy, and he also establishes a network of supporters, The League of the Scarlet Pimpernel, who aid his endeavours.

Orczy wrote over a dozen sequels featuring Sir Percy Blakeney, his family, and the other members of the League of the Scarlet Pimpernel, of which the first, I Will Repay (1906), was the most popular. The last Pimpernel book, Mam'zelle Guillotine, was published in 1940. None of her three subsequent plays matched the success of The Scarlet Pimpernel. She wrote mystery fiction and adventure romances. Her Lady Molly of Scotland Yard was an early example of a female detective as the main character. Other popular detective stories featured The Old Man in the Corner, a sleuth who chiefly used logic to solve crimes. Orczy was a founding member of the Detection Club (1930).

Orczy's novels were racy, mannered melodramas and she favoured historical fiction. Critic Mary Cadogan states, "Orczy's books are highly wrought and intensely atmospheric". In The Nest of the Sparrowhawk (1909), for example, a malicious guardian in Puritan Kent tricks his beautiful, wealthy young ward into marrying him by disguising himself as an exiled French prince. He persuades his widowed sister-in-law to abet him in this plot, in which she unwittingly disgraces one of her long-lost sons and finds the other murdered by the villain. Even though this novel had no link to The Scarlet Pimpernel other than its shared authorship, the publisher advertised it as part of "The Scarlet Pimpernel Series".

== Political views ==
Orczy held strong political views. She was a firm believer in the superiority of the aristocracy, as well as being a supporter of British imperialism and militarism. During World War I, Orczy formed the Women of England's Active Service League, an unofficial organisation aimed at encouraging women to persuade men to volunteer for active service in the armed forces. Her aim was to enlist 100,000 women who would pledge "to persuade every man I know to offer his service to his country". Some 20,000 women joined her organisation. Orczy strongly opposed the Soviet Union.

== Later life ==
Orczy's work was so successful that she was able to buy a house in Monte Carlo: "Villa Bijou" at 19 Avenue de la Costa (since demolished), which is where she spent World War II. She was not able to return to London until after the war. Montagu Barstow died in Monte Carlo in 1942. Finding herself alone and unable to travel, she wrote her memoir Links in the Chain of Life (published 1947).

She died in Henley-on-Thames, Oxfordshire on 12 November 1947.

== Name pronunciation ==
Asked how to say her name, Orczy told The Literary Digest: "Or-tsey. Emmuska—a diminutive meaning 'little Emma'—accent on the first syllable, the s equivalent to sh in English; thus, EM-moosh-ka."

== Works ==
Translations

- Old Hungarian Fairy Tales (1895) translator with Montague Barstow
- Uletka and the White Lizard, Volume 1 of ‘The Queen Mab Series of Fairy Tales (1895) translator with Montague Barstow
- The Enchanted Cat, Volume 2 of ‘The Queen Mab Series of Fairy Tales’ 1895) translator with Montague Barstow
- Fairyland's Beauty, Volume 3 of ‘The Queen Mab Series of Fairy Tales’ (1895) translator with Montague Barstow

Plays

- The Scarlet Pimpernel (1903) with Montague Barstow, as ‘Orczy-Barstow’
- The Sin of William Jackson (1906) with Montague Barstow
- Beau Brocade (1908) with Montague Barstow. Written in 1905
- ‘’The Whip’’. With Montague Barstow
- The Duke's Wager (1911)
- The Legion of Honour (1918), adapted from A Sheaf of Bluebells

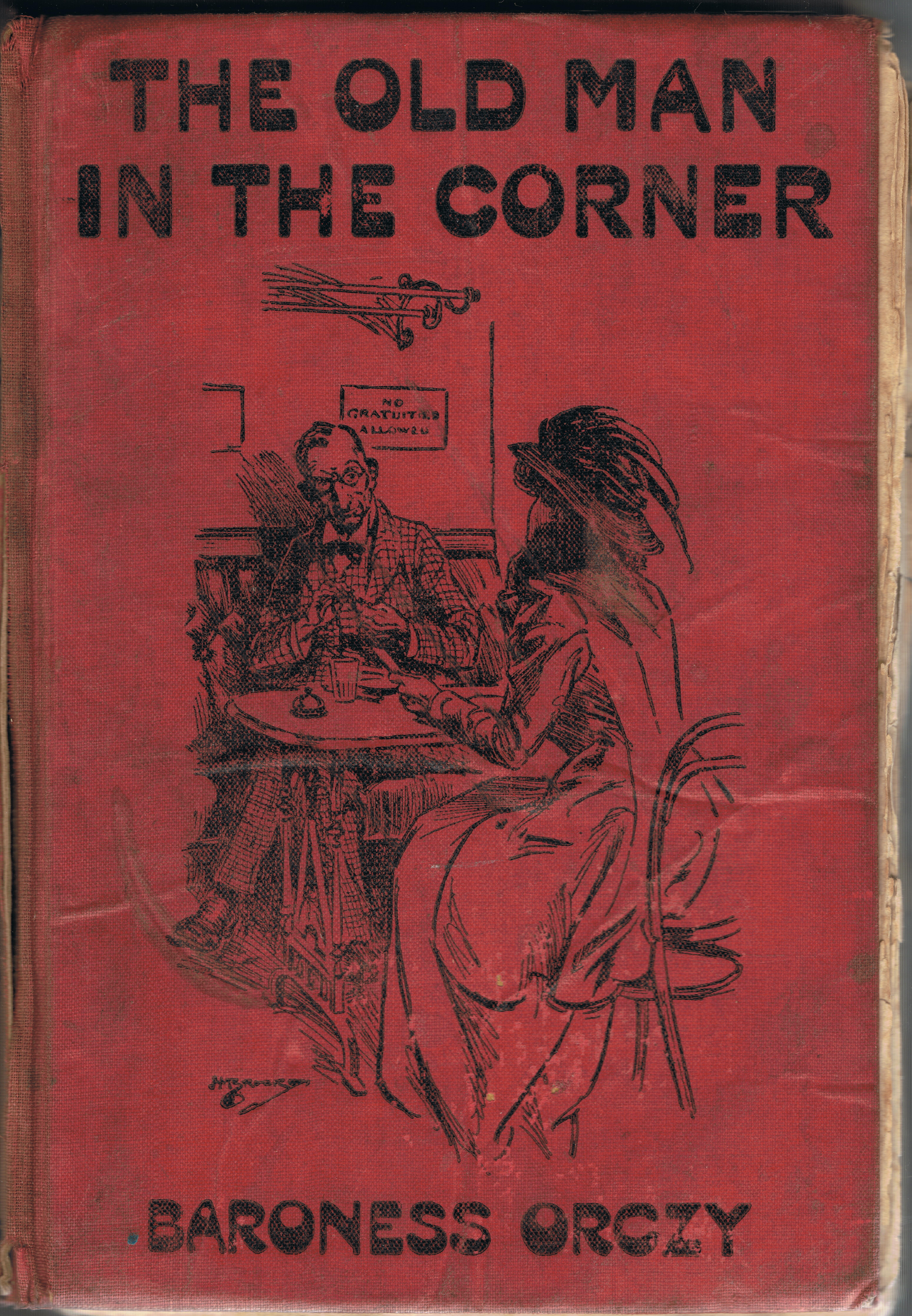
H.M. Brock's cover of Baroness Orczy's The Old Man in the Corner (popular edition, Greening & Co., London, 1910).

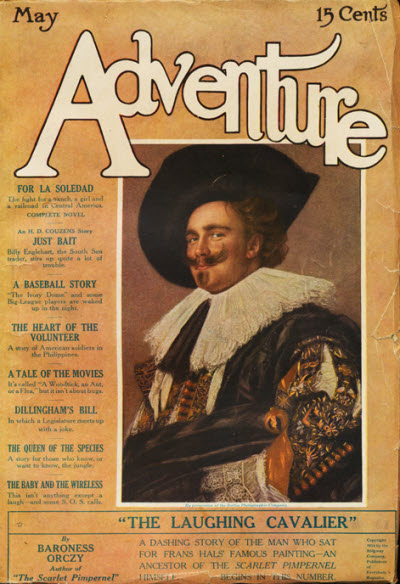
The Laughing Cavalier was serialised in Adventure in 1914

Short story collections

The Man in The Corner Series

- The Case of Miss Elliott (1905)
- The Old Man in the Corner (1909)
- Unravelled Knots (1925)

Scarlet Pimpernel Series

- The League of the Scarlet Pimpernel (1919)
- Adventures of the Scarlet Pimpernel (1929)

Other short story books

- Lady Molly of Scotland Yard (1910)
- The Man in Grey (1918)
- Castles in the Air (1921)
- Skin o' My Tooth (1928)

=== Novels ===
- The Emperor's Candlesticks (1899)
- In Mary's Reign (1901) later The Tangled Skein (1907)
- The Scarlet Pimpernel (1905) (The Scarlet Pimpernel)
- By the Gods Beloved (1905) later released in the US as The Gates of Kamt (1907)
- A Son of the People (1906)
- I Will Repay (1906) (The Scarlet Pimpernel)
- ‘’A Tangled Skein’’
- Beau Brocade (1907)
- The Elusive Pimpernel (1908) (The Scarlet Pimpernel)
- The Nest of the Sparrowhawk (1909). Serialised, The Imp Magazine, 1909
- Petticoat Government (1910). Serialised in The Queen Newspaper, 1909, and previously released as A Ruler of Princes (1909), also known as Petticoat Rule (1910)
- A True Woman (1911)
- The Good Patriots (1912)
- Fire in Stubble (1912). Serialised, John Bull, 1911
- Meadowsweet (1912). Serialised, The Queen Newspaper, 1912
- Eldorado (1913) (The Scarlet Pimpernel)
- Unto Cæsar (1914). Serialised, The Woman at Home, 1913
- The Laughing Cavalier (1914) (The Scarlet Pimpernel)
- A Bride of the Plains (1915)
- The Bronze Eagle (1915)
- Leatherface (1916)
- Lord Tony's Wife (1917) (The Scarlet Pimpernel)
- A Sheaf of Bluebells (1917)
- Flower o' the Lily (1918)
- His Majesty's Well-beloved (1919)
- The First Sir Percy (1921) (The Scarlet Pimpernel)
- The Triumph of the Scarlet Pimpernel (1922) (The Scarlet Pimpernel)
- Nicolette: A Tale of Old Provence (1922)
- The Honourable Jim (1924)
- Pimpernel and Rosemary (1924) (The Scarlet Pimpernel)
- A Question of Temptation (1925)
- The Celestial City (1926)
- Sir Percy Hits Back (1927) (The Scarlet Pimpernel)
- Blue Eyes and Grey (1928)
- Marivosa (1930)
- A Joyous Adventure (1932)
- A Child of the Revolution (1932) (The Scarlet Pimpernel)
- The Scarlet Pimpernel Looks at the World (1933) (The Scarlet Pimpernel)
- The Way of the Scarlet Pimpernel (1933) (The Scarlet Pimpernel)
- A Spy of Napoleon (1934)
- The Uncrowned King (1935)
- The Turbulent Duchess (1935)
- Sir Percy Leads the Band (1936) (The Scarlet Pimpernel)
- The Divine Folly (1937)
- No Greater Love (1938)
- Mam'zelle Guillotine (1940) (The Scarlet Pimpernel)
- Pride of Race (1942)
- The Will-O'-The-Wisp (1947)

=== Short stories ===
- "The Red Carnation" (First published in Pearson’s Magazine, June 1898, reprinted in Everybody's Magazine, June 1900)
- The Traitor (1898)
- Juliette (1899)
- Number 187 (1899)
- The Trappists Vow (1899)
- The Revenge of Ur-Tasen (1900)
- The Murder in Saltashe Woods Windsor Magazine, June 1903 (Skin o’ My Tooth)
- The Case of the Polish Prince Windsor Magazine, July 1903 (Skin o’ My Tooth)
- The Case of Major Gibson Windsor Magazine, August 1903 (Skin o’ My Tooth)
- The Duffield Peerage Case Windsor Magazine, September 1903 (Skin o’ My Tooth)
- The Case of Mrs. Norris Windsor Magazine, October 1903 (Skin o’ My Tooth)
- The Murton-Braby Murder Windsor Magazine, November 1903 (Skin o’ My Tooth)
- The Traitor Cassell's Magazine of Fiction, May 1912. Collected in The League of the Scarlet Pimpernel (The Scarlet Pimpernel)
- Out of the Jaws of Death Princess Mary's Gift Book, 1914. Collected in The League of the Scarlet Pimpernel (The Scarlet Pimpernel)
- A Fine Bit of Work The New Magazine, Christmas 1914. Collected in The League of the Scarlet Pimpernel (The Scarlet Pimpernel)
- In the Rue Monge (1931) (The Scarlet Pimpernel)

=== Omnibus editions ===
- The Scarlet Pimpernel etc. (1930) collection of four novels
- The Gallant Pimpernel (1939) collection of four novels
- The Scarlet Pimpernel Omnibus (1957) collection of four novels

=== Non-fiction ===
- ‘’If I Were a Millionaire’’. Young Woman, August 1909
- Les Beaux et les Dandys de Grand Siècles en Angleterre (a lecture delivered at the Société des Conférences, Monte Carlo) (1924)
- Links in the Chain of Life (autobiography, 1947)

=== The Scarlet Pimpernel Chronology ===
1. The Laughing Cavalier (1914)
2. The First Sir Percy (1921)
3. The Scarlet Pimpernel (1905)
4. Sir Percy Leads the Band (1936)
5. The League of the Scarlet Pimpernel (1919) - short story collection
6. I Will Repay (1906)
7. The Elusive Pimpernel (1908)
8. The Way of the Scarlet Pimpernel (1933)
9. Lord Tony's Wife (1917)
10. El dorado (1913)
11. Mam'zelle Guillotine (1940)
12. The Triumph of the Scarlet Pimpernel (1922)
13. Sir Percy Hits Back (1927)
14. Adventures of the Scarlet Pimpernel (1929) - short story collection
15. A Child of the Revolution (1932)
16. In the Rue Monge (1931) - short story
17. Pimpernel and Rosemary (1924)
18. The Scarlet Pimpernel Looks at the World (1933) with Montague Barstow

== Filmography ==
- 1916: Beau Brocade (dir. Thomas Bentley)
- 1917: The Laughing Cavalier (dir. A. V. Bramble, Eliot Stannard)
- 1919: The Elusive Pimpernel (dir. Maurice Elvey)
- 1923: I Will Repay (dir. Henry Kolker)
- 1928: Two Lovers (dir. Fred Niblo)
- 1928: The Triumph of the Scarlet Pimpernel (dir. T. Hayes Hunter)
- 1934: The Scarlet Pimpernel (dir. Harold Young)
- 1936: The Emperor's Candlesticks (dir. Karl Hartl)
- 1936: Spy of Napoleon (dir. Maurice Elvey)
- 1937: The Emperor's Candlesticks (dir. George Fitzmaurice)
- 1937: Return of the Scarlet Pimpernel (dir. Hanns Schwarz)
- 1950: The Elusive Pimpernel (dir. Michael Powell, Emeric Pressburger)
- 1982: The Scarlet Pimpernel (dir. Clive Donner)
