= Mam'zelle Guillotine =

- Cover of the 1940 first edition
- Author: Baroness Orczy
- Illustrator: R Dawson
- Language: English
- Series: The Scarlet Pimpernel
- Genre: Adventure, Historical novel
- Publisher: Hodder & Stoughton
- Publication date: 1940
- Publication place: United Kingdom
- Media type: Print (hardback & paperback)
- Pages: 286
- ISBN: 978-1-56849-738-9 (USA edition)
- OCLC: 52453872
- Preceded by: Eldorado
- Followed by: Sir Percy Hits Back

Mam'zelle Guillotine, by Baroness Orczy, is a sequel book to the classic adventure tale, The Scarlet Pimpernel. First published in 1940, it was the last novel Orczy wrote featuring the Pimpernel and is dedicated to those fighting in World War II.

"To all those who are fighting in the air, on the water and on land for our country and for our homes, I dedicate this because it is to them that we shall owe a happy issue out of all our troubles and a lasting peace." - Emmuska Orczy - Monte Carlo - 1939-40

== Plot summary ==
Mam'zelle Guillotine follows Gabrielle Damiens, the daughter of Francois Damiens, a man arrested for attacking the King of France with a pocket knife. Although the wound was minor, Damiens' punishment for drawing royal blood was to be hanged, drawn and quartered.

At age 16, Gabrielle finds letters written by her father which prove that his crime had been instigated and aided by a body of noble gentlemen, who planned it as warning to the King to change his ways. Damiens bore the brunt of this conspiracy in silence while the aristocrats remained immune.

With the evidence of their crime, Gabrielle sets out to confront the Marquis de Saint-Lucque, the only person named in the letters, and succeeds in extorting a large amount of money from him. She also starts an affair with his son, Vicomte Fernand, who is oblivious to the whole situation. Before long Gabrielle is living in luxury and has aspirations to marry the young Vicomte. Her plans are dashed when Fernand breaks off their affair as the King has decided that the Vicomte should marry his illegitimate daughter, Neve de Nesle.

Furious, Gabrielle tries to blackmail the Vicomte into marrying her using the letters which prove his father's guilt. But she has not counted on Neve's mother, Madame de Nesle, who on hearing of the situation, uses her position as the King's favourite to have Gabrielle, now 19, thrown into prison without trial.

She spends the next 16 years in prison, feeding her rage and lust for revenge on the Saint-Lucque family. On 14 July 1789 she is released from the Bastille after it is stormed by the mob, the French Revolution having begun.

Mad for revenge, Gabrielle works her way into the favour of the men behind the new republic, and before long has become the public executioner of Artois. As France's only female executioner she is feared by many and known throughout Artois as Mam'zelle Guillotine.

When the Saint-Lucque family (Fernand, Neve and their three children) are captured as traitors, Gabrielle determines that finally she will have her revenge. English spies manage to rescue the Marquis and his young son, but his wife and two daughters are still in danger of being sent to the guillotine. Gabrielle fails to notice that the new sleuth sent from Paris by Chauvelin to track down the English spies is really the Scarlet Pimpernel in disguise.

== Reception ==
The character of Gabrielle has been interpreted as a 'figure of fun' yet also 'a highly dangerous opponent'. Sally Duggan notes that Orczy invokes biblical language to celebrate Gabrielle's downfall at the end of the book - depicting the Frenchwoman as 'a warning to all assertive females'.
