= I Will Repay (film) =

1923 film by Henry Kolker

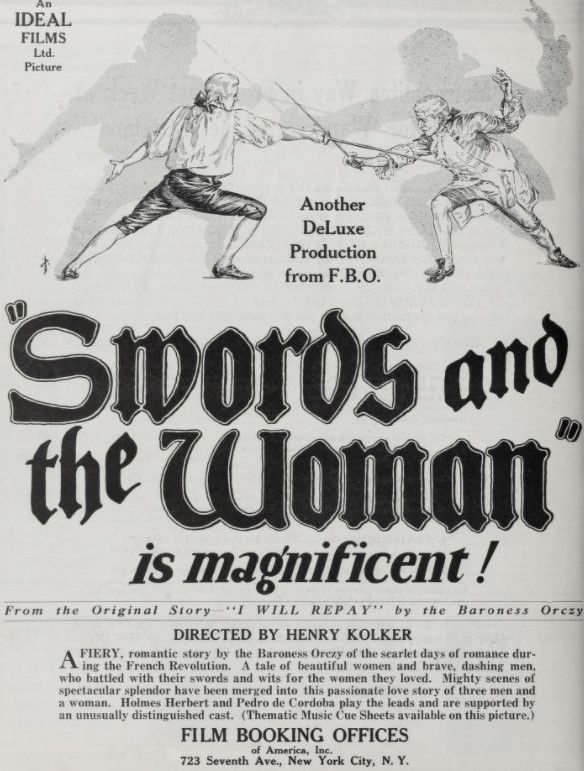
- American advertisement using its American title
- Directed by: Henry Kolker
- Written by: Isabel Johnston; Kinchen Wood
- Based on: I Will Repay by Emma Orczy
- Starring: Holmes Herbert; Flora le Breton; Pedro de Cordoba; Ivan Samson
- Production company: Ideal Film Company
- Distributed by: Ideal Film Company (UK); FBO (US)
- Release dates: 1923 (UK); 12 July 1924 (US)
- Running time: 70 minutes
- Country: United Kingdom
- Language: Silent (English intertitles)

I Will Repay is a 1923 British silent period film directed by Henry Kolker and starring Holmes Herbert, Flora le Breton, and Pedro de Cordoba. It was based on the 1906 novel I Will Repay by Emma Orczy, which is a sequel to The Scarlet Pimpernel (part of a large series of such novels). It was released in the United States under the alternative title Swords and the Woman.

== Plot ==
The film takes place in Paris, 1793, during the Reign of Terror following the start of the French Revolution. Paul de Roulade (Pedro de Cordoba) is a hero to the Proletariat, who cry him 'Citizen de Roulade'. One evening he gets into an argument with the Vicomte de Marny over the virtues of a dancing girl; this leads to a fight (provoked by the viscount), forcing Paul to kill the nobleman. The viscount's sister Juliette de Marny (Flora le Breton) swears revenge: to achieve this, she infiltrates the de Roulade household and beguiles Paul into falling in love with her.

It is revealed that Paul has secret Royalist sympathies and, wary of the bloodshed, he decides to smuggle Marie Antoinette out of France . To do this, he enlists the aid of none other than the Scarlet Pimpernel (Holmes Herbert).

When Juliette learns of Paul's intrigue, she realises that this is her chance to get revenge by betraying him to the Jacquards. Or will she fall in love with him as he has with her? Meanwhile, we get a few scenes of Charlotte Corday on trial for the murder of Marat.

== Cast ==
- Holmes Herbert as Sir Percy Blakeney
- Flora le Breton as Juliette de Mornay
- Pedro de Cordoba as Paul Deroulede
- Ivan Samson as Viscount de Mornay
- A.B. Imeson as Tinville
- Georges Tréville as Duc de Mornay
- Robert Lang as Villefranche
