= Sir Percy Hits Back =

Book by Emma Orczy

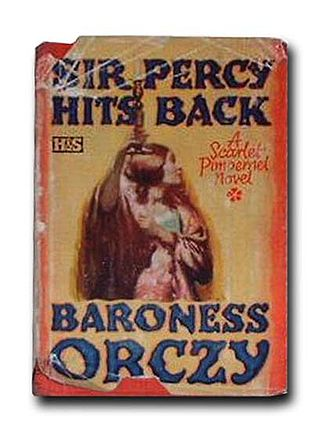
- 1927 First Edition
- Author: Baroness Orczy
- Language: English
- Series: The Scarlet Pimpernel
- Genre: Adventure, Historical novel
- Published: 1927 Hodder & Stoughton
- Publication place: United Kingdom
- Media type: Print (Hardback & Paperback)
- Pages: 319 pp
- Preceded by: Mam'zelle Guillotine
- Followed by: Adventures of the Scarlet Pimpernel

Sir Percy Hits Back is (chronologically) the ninth book in the Scarlet Pimpernel series by Baroness Orczy. It was first published in 1927 by Hodder & Stoughton.

A French-language version, translated and adapted by Charlotte and Marie-Louise Desroyses, was also published under the title La Vengeance de Sir Percy.

== Plot ==
For young and pretty Fleurette, brought up in a sheltered country household near Laragne in the valley of the Buëche, the Revolution seems far away. She adores her father, whom she knows only by the pet-name "Bibi" and who is mysteriously absent for long periods, and she is in love with her sweetheart, Amédé Colombe. The dangers of the Terror become all too real when a neighbouring aristocratic family is threatened with the guillotine and Fleurette is drawn into helping them. She is denounced and accused of being a traitor, and Amédé is also placed in peril.

It then emerges that Fleurette's beloved "Bibi" is in fact Armand Chauvelin, the implacable enemy of the Scarlet Pimpernel. Caught up in the machinery of the Terror he has himself helped to create, Chauvelin is forced for the first time to ask his arch-enemy, the heroic Scarlet Pimpernel, for help in saving his innocent daughter, and the story builds to a final confrontation between the two men.
