= The Elusive Pimpernel (1919 film) =

1919 film

- Directed by: Maurice Elvey
- Release date: 1919
- Country: United Kingdom
- Language: Silent

The Elusive Pimpernel is a 1919 British silent adventure film directed by Maurice Elvey and starring Cecil Humphreys, Marie Blanche and Norman Page. It was based on the 1908 novel The Elusive Pimpernel by Baroness Orczy.

== Plot ==
A foppish English aristocrat secretly rescues people from the guillotine during the French Revolution.

== Cast ==
- Cecil Humphreys as Sir Percy Blakeney
- Marie Blanche as Lady Blakeney
- Norman Page as Chauvelin
- A.C. Fotheringham-Lysons as Robespierre
- Teddy Arundell as Colet d'Herbois
- Madge Stuart as Juliette Marny
- A. Harding Steerman as Abbe Jouquet
- Dorothy Hanson as Mlle. Cardeille
