= Jean, Baron de Batz =

French royalist and businessman (1754–1822)

Jean Pierre de Batz, Baron de Sainte-Croix
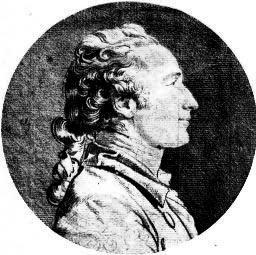
- Jean Pierre de Batz
- Born: 26 January 1754
- Died: 10 January 1822 (aged 67)
- Occupations: French royalist and businessman

Jean Pierre de Batz, Baron de Sainte-Croix, known as the Baron de Batz or de Bance, (26 January 1754 – 10 January 1822), was a French royalist and businessman. He is best known for his efforts, often daring and often placing him at personal risk, to save King Louis XVI and Queen Marie Antoinette. He was born in Goutz-les-Tartas (Gers), and died in Chadieu, near Vic-le-Comte (Puy-de-Dôme).

His life and actions in the service of the French monarchy inspired several popular novelists, including Baroness Orczy (Eldorado, 1913), Rafael Sabatini (Scaramouche the King-Maker, 1931) and more recently Juliette Benzoni (Le Jeu de l'amour et de la mort series, 1999–2000).

== Biography ==
=== Royal agent ===
Under the Constituent Assembly, de Batz's reputation as a financier led to his appointment on 28 May 1790 to the Liquidation Committee, which was responsible for clearing public accounts. It appears that de Batz conducted liquidations of fraudulent debts, and sold them to his friends who then reimbursed him. At the same time, he became a secret adviser to Louis XVI, and organized the financing of a secret policy implemented at the Château des Tuileries under Armand Marc, comte de Montmorin to defend the monarchy, which continued until at least 10 August 1792. On his own account, de Batz advanced to Louis XVI a sum exceeding 500,000 livres.

Baron de Batz's closest ally was the Minister of Finance, Étienne Clavière, and under the guise of missions Clavière entrusted to him, de Batz made several voyages abroad between March 1792 and January 1793, during which he maintained contacts with foreign monarchs and royalist sympathizers. De Batz also had close ties to Louis Auguste Le Tonnelier de Breteuil, the last chief minister to Louis XVI and leader of the Bourbon government in exile after Louis was executed.

On 21 January 1793, de Batz tried in vain to raise the crowd in boulevard de Bonne Nouvelle to save the king from execution. Several royalists were killed, though de Batz managed to escape. De Batz also made efforts to save the queen, Marie Antoinette. He remained partially in hiding until he obtained a certificate of non-emigration in June 1793.

=== Conspiracies ===
At the end of October 1793, fraud was uncovered in the liquidation of the French East India Company, and de Batz was named as the leader of a vast conspiracy against the fledgeling republic. According to a declaration made in prison by François Chabot, de Batz had frequently met with leaders of the Paris Commune and the National Convention, including Committee of Public Safety members Claude Basire, Julien de Toulouse and Delaunay d'Angers. Chabot also claimed that de Batz had held talks with foreign bankers including Junius Frey and his brother Emmanuel Frey (of Austria), Pierre-Jean Berthold de Prosly (of Brussels) (fr), Andres Maria de Guzman (of Spain), and Jacob Pereira (of Portugal), and that de Batz's efforts were funded at least in part by British money. These accusations were themselves were likely intended to undermine de Batz and his collaborators.

It was at about this time that de Batz, who still concealed his true loyalties, secretly proposed undermining the Revolution by printing counterfeit assignats, the paper currency the Republic depended on to finance its activities. According to historian Arnaud de Lestapis fr:Arnaud de Lestapis, Batz had a network of a dozen nobles (see below) to assist him in distributing the bogus paper.

Lestapis observes that Batz's plan was similar to one that historian Louis Blanc claimed was provided to the Pitt government by the Scottish banker William Playfair at about the same time. A proposal in Playfair's handwriting that appears to be the one Blanc referred to was later found in a collection of letters from Playfair to Henry Dundas, the former British Secretary of War.

Both the popular historical author Meade Minnigerode's biography of de Batz and the proposal that Blanc attributed to Playfair claim that a goal of these economic warfare measures was to create chaos within the Revolution by turning its leaders against each other. Playfair would later write that he and de Batz were close friends, and, according to the memoir published by one of de Batz's descendants, the Baron crossed the Channel regularly during this time, meeting with British leaders, including Lord Sydney, the Duke of Richmond, and Lord Gower, who had been England's ambassador to Paris during the insurrection that toppled the King.

Lestapis notes that the forgery of assignats was one reason the French Republic gave for declaring war on Britain, suggesting that it achieved its goal of disruption. According to Minnigerode and academic historians such as David Andress, de Batz was also secretly aiding the royalists by skimming funds from the transactions he conducted for the French Republic that would be used to support counterrevolutionary activities.

At the time, de Batz was also regularly traveling between the provinces and Switzerland, and learned that his friends and most of his relations had been arrested. Denunciations were gathered to build an indictment. On 14 March 1794, Hébertistes, Clootz, Pereira and Prosly were guillotined. On 5 April, Georges Danton and his friends were executed with Chabot, Basire, the abbot of Espagnac, Guzman, and the Frey brothers. Historians such as Norman Hampson argue that de Batz escaped accusations of involvement in the scandal by using his knowledge of his accusers' own corruption.

=== After the Reign of Terror ===
Returning to France, de Batz was involved in the royalist insurrection of 5 October 1795, and imprisoned. After the Coup of 18 Fructidor (4 September 1797), he took refuge in Auvergne where he owned a castle. Discovered, he was arrested, but escaped during his transfer to Lyon and fled to Switzerland. The French Consulate had him removed from the list of emigrants and he abandoned political activism, returning to live in Auvergne.

Under the Bourbon Restoration, he was awarded the rank of maréchal de camp (field marshal) and the cross of St. Louis for his services, as well as the military command of Cantal, which was revoked after the Hundred Days period.

Living in seclusion in Chadieu, near Vic-le-Comte, he died on 10 January 1822.

== Literary representations ==
The character of the double agent, a supporter of the monarchy and member of a network of Royalist agents in France and abroad whilst masquerading as a staunch Republican, is a stock character in literature set during the French Revolution. Through his activities, this character sends many revolutionaries to the guillotine, having them convicted of being anti-revolutionaries. Fictionalizations of de Batz appear in several novels:

- Jean de Batz is the hero of a series of novels by Juliette Benzoni, The Game of Love and Death.
- The Baron de Batz appears in a few of The Scarlet Pimpernel series of books by Baroness Orczy, playing the most prominent role in Eldorado.
- He also appears as a major character in Raphael Sabatini's novel Scaramouche the King-Maker, and a minor character in The Lost King.
- Jean de Batz is a lead character in the historic fiction novel Seed of Mischief by Willa Gibbs, 1953. The book revolves around the Dauphin, Louis-Charles (1785–1795).
- Baron de Batz appears in Dennis Wheatley’s "To Kill a King", in the Roger Brook series. He serves as a colleague with a shared aim but also a foil to Brook’s attempts to rescue the Royal Family and reconcile with his wife.

There are also biographies of de Batz:

- Meade Minnigerode, (1936) Marie Antoinette's Henchman – The Career of Jean de Batz in the French Revolution, available at Internet Archive
- G. Lenotre, A Gascon Royalist in Revolutionary Paris (translated by Rodolph Stawell), available at Internet Archive

== Sources ==
- Roger Dupuy, "Jean, baron de Batz", in albert Soboul (dir.), Dictionnaire historique de la Révolution française, Paris, PUF, 1989 (rééd. Quadrige, 2005, p. 96–97)
- Noëlle Destremau, Le baron de Batz un étonnant Conspirateur, Nouvelles Editions Latines.
- G. Lenotre, Le baron de Batz, Librairie académique Perrin et Cie
- Baron de Batz, La vie et les conspirations de Jean, Baron de Batz, 1754–1793, Les conspirations et la fin de Jean, Baron de Batz, 1793–1822, Calmann-Lévy, 1910–1911.
