= I Will Repay (novel) =

1906 novel by Baroness Orczy

- 1906 First edition
- Author: Baroness Orczy
- Language: English
- Genre: Adventure, Historical novel
- Publisher: Greening & Co, London
- Publication date: 1906
- Publication place: United Kingdom
- Pages: 325 pp
- ISBN: 978-1514848791
- Preceded by: The League of the Scarlet Pimpernel
- Followed by: The Elusive Pimpernel

I Will Repay is a novel by Baroness Emmuska Orczy, originally published in 1906. It is a sequel to The Scarlet Pimpernel and was the second Pimpernel book Orczy wrote, although it comes chronologically third in the series, after Sir Percy Leads the Band and before The Elusive Pimpernel.

== Background ==
I Will Repay was the first sequel Orczy wrote to The Scarlet Pimpernel, and it became one of the most popular of her early Pimpernel novels. It was published in London by Greening & Co in 1906.

A frequently noted anachronism occurs when the climactic chapter ends at the grave of Abélard and Héloïse at Père Lachaise Cemetery; the cemetery was not founded until 1804, more than ten years after the events of the story, and Abélard's and Héloïse's remains were not moved there until 1817.

== Plot summary ==
The story starts in 1784, before the French Revolution. Wealthy Paul Déroulède has offended the young Vicomte de Marny by speaking disrespectfully of his latest infatuation, Adèle de Monterchéri. Déroulède had not intended to get into the quarrel but has a tendency to blunder into things -- "no doubt a part of the inheritance bequeathed to him by his bourgeois ancestry."

Incensed at the slur on Adèle, whom he sees as a paragon of virtue, the Vicomte challenges Déroulède to a duel, a fight which Déroulède does not want - for he knows and respects the boy's father, the Duc de Marny. Swords drawn, the fight ensues in the centre of the salon but despite his noble lineage, the Vicomte de Marny is no match for Déroulède's swordplay, especially when addled with wine and rage. Déroulède disarms his opponent and having won the duel, draws back but the boy refuses to back down without complete satisfaction and demands that Déroulède get down on his knees and apologize.

Finally losing his temper with the young Vicomte, Déroulède raises his sword to disarm his protagonist once more, however de Marny lunges wildly at his opponent's breast and manages to literally throw himself on Déroulède's weapon. The boy is dead and Déroulède can do nothing but leave the establishment.

On hearing of the death of his only son, the Duc de Marny (by now a cripple and almost a dotard) is distraught. The Duc summons his fourteen-year-old daughter, Juliette, to his side and forces her to swear an oath to ruin Déroulede in revenge for her brother's death, telling her that her brother's soul will remain in torment until the final judgement day should she break her promise.

The story picks up ten years later, and Citizen Déroulède, though no longer rich, is a lawyer popular with the people and is allowed to go his own way, for Marat has said of him "Il n'est pas dangereux". He leads a quiet life, living alone with his mother and his orphaned cousin Anne Mie in the Rue Ecole de Médecine.

At 6 pm on August 19, 1793, Juliette Marny walks into the Rue Ecole de Médecine and stopping just outside the house belonging to Citizen-Deputy Déroulède, suddenly starts to draw attention to herself, invoking the anger of the crowd through her proud aristocratic manner. She hammers on Déroulède's door as the crowd shout and lash out at her, but just before they can drag her away, the door opens and she is pulled inside.

Having tricked her way into Déroulede's home Juliette is invited to stay for her own safety. She agrees and eventually reveals her identity, but even after hearing Déroulede's side of the story, she fails to realise that he only wishes to make amends for the death of her brother and continues to plot revenge on her host.

Unaware of her intentions, Déroulede tells Juliette that he has accepted the post of Governor of the Conciergerie prison where Queen Marie Antoinette is imprisoned. Later he is visited at home by Sir Percy Blakeney and Juliette overhears Sir Percy warning his friend off a scheme to free the queen, for it is doomed to failure. He advises Déroulede to burn a bundle of papers relating to the plot, which if found would result in him being arrested for treason and sentenced to death.

Juliette sees her chance and posts a letter denouncing her host, but realises too late that she has failed to take account of the fact that not only has Paul Déroulede fallen madly in love with her, she has also come to love the man she has vowed to destroy.

When soldiers arrive to search Déroulede's home, Juliette hides the letter box, then escapes to her room where she attempts to burn it. She places the burnt remains among her belongings, and when the soldiers discover them, they arrest her. Because the search turned up nothing suspicious against Déroulede he is allowed to remain free.

During her trial, Juliette keeps to the story that the burnt letterbox contained love letters. However, Déroulede defends his love and admits that the letters are his own and that he has committed treason. Both of them are sentenced to death.

The Scarlet Pimpernel and his comrades manage to rescue the condemned couple on their journey from the courthouse to the prison.

== Adaptation ==
The novel was adapted into the 1923 British silent film I Will Repay, directed by Henry Kolker and released in the United States as Swords and the Woman.
