= The League of the Scarlet Pimpernel =

1919 book by Baroness Orczy

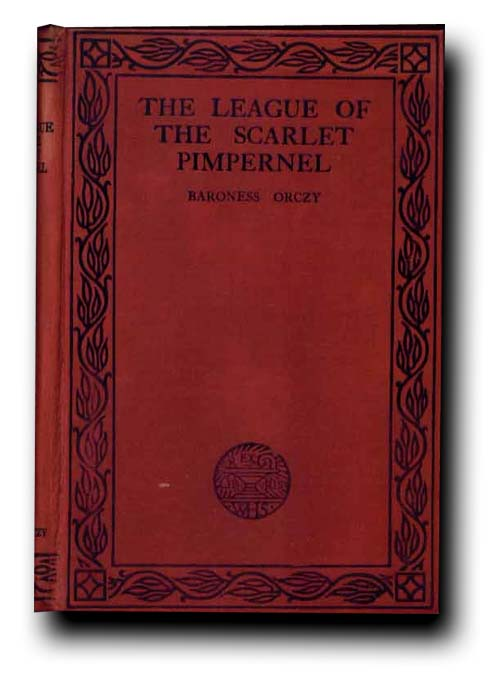
- Cover of the 1919 first edition
- Author: Baroness Orczy
- Language: English
- Series: The Scarlet Pimpernel
- Genre: Adventure, Historical short stories
- Publisher: Cassell & Co, London
- Publication date: March 1919
- Publication place: United Kingdom
- Media type: Print (hardback & paperback)
- Pages: 313 pp
- Preceded by: Sir Percy Leads the Band
- Followed by: I Will Repay

The League of the Scarlet Pimpernel is a sequel book to the classic adventure tale, The Scarlet Pimpernel. Written by Baroness Orczy and first published in March 1919 by Cassell & Co, the book consists of eleven short stories about Sir Percy Blakeney's exploits in rescuing various aristos and French citizens from the clutches of the guillotine.

The stories, which are listed below, are set in 1793 but appear in no particular order. They occasionally refer to events in other books in the series.

== Contents ==
=== Sir Percy Explains ===
Madeleine Lannoy, whose husband was killed at Versailles defending the Queen from the mob, becomes a street dancer in the worst parts of Paris in the hope of finding her only son, who was stolen by Jean-Paul Marat after she spurned his advances. All she knows is that her child "is to be reared up in the company of all that is most vile and most degraded in the disease-haunted slums of indigent Paris" and that if she doesn't find him soon she fears he'll become a criminal or a drunken reprobate at best.

=== A Question of Passports ===
Citizen Bibot of the Town Guard has command of the Porte Montmartre – the last commandant there, citizen Ferney, was guillotined for having allowed a whole batch of aristos to escape and find safety outside the walls of Paris. Citizen Marat arrives to warn Bibot to be watchful because the Pimpernel has promised to rescue the Duc and Duchesse de Montreux and their family, (who are on their way to the Conciergerie prison) that very evening, but Bibot is determined that the Scarlet Pimpernel will not get one over on him.

=== Two Good Patriots ===
Being the disposition of citizeness Fanny Roussell, who was brought up together with her husband, before the Tribunal of the Revolution on a charge of Treason – both being subsequently acquitted.

=== The Old Scarecrow ===
Nobody in the quartier could quite recollect when it was that citizen Lepine, the new public letter-writer first set up in business at the angle formed by the Quai des Augustins and the Rue Dauphine; but he certainly was there on 35 February 1793, when Agnes, with eyes swollen with tears, a market basket on her arm and a look of dreary despair on her young face, turned that self same angle on her way to the Pont Neuf, and nearly fell over the rickety construction which sheltered him and his stock.

=== A Fine Bit of Work ===
Pierre Lenėgre had been a footman in the household of Marie Antoinette. After speaking out in favour of the Queen in a public place he was denounced by the Committee of Public Safety and would have gone to the guillotine had the Scarlet Pimpernel not saved him. Sir Percy is visiting Pierre's parents when he learns that Père Lenègre has been denounced by the concierge Jean Baptiste, who knows Percy often visits them, and that the gendarmes are on their way to arrest him.

=== How Jean-Pierre Met the Scarlet Pimpernel ===
The Marquis and Marquise de Mortaine and their son le Vicomte are hiding from the Revolutionary Guard in the attic of a house in Lyons. Out of money they have not eaten for two days and the young Vicomte is slowly starving to death. Their loyal servant Jean-Pierre is out looking for milk for the child when he passes out from hunger, awaking to the sound of two men talking in English. He tells the crowd who are after them, which direction they have gone in return for a bottle of wine and a roast capon, but he soon feels like a treacherous coward. Having dropped and broken the precious wine bottle he is rescued by the two strangers who listen to his plight and bring food to the starving aristos. It becomes evident that the Vicomte is very ill and must see a doctor at once, but the only man up to the job is the infamous republican Citizen Laporte, who would certainly send them all to the guillotine.

=== Out of the Jaws of Death ===
Being a fragment from the diary of Valentine Lemercier in the possession of her great-granddaughter. The Lemercier family have been arrested and imprisoned in a dank vault in the Abbaye. They have been in prison for a fortnight when they hear in the distance a noise like the rumbling of thunder – it is the start of the September massacres and hundreds of men, women and children are being slaughtered in the prisons. They are convinced they are facing death and it seems the moment they are dreading has arrived, for heavy blows are falling against the masonry around their prison window.

=== The Traitor ===
November 1793. Lord Kulmsted is a member of the League of the Scarlet Pimpernel, however, for some time he has been an adherent in name only. Whether his embitterment comes from lack of money, or jealously of Sir Percy, his oath of fealty has been broken and the threat of treachery hovers in the air. The Scarlet Pimpernel appears not to heed Kulmsted's disloyalty and, against the wishes of the other league members, includes him in a mission to Paris to rescue some women from the household of Marie Antoinette, condemned to die for their loyalty to their martyred queen.

=== The Cabaret de la Liberté ===
Esther Vincent is the daughter of a wealthy banker who has already been sent to the guillotine. Although her father's house and property was confiscated after his death, the representatives of the people never found the millions which he was supposed to have concealed. Esther is now living in one of the poorer parts of Paris while a number of astute jailbirds are plotting to obtain her money and wealth by forcing her to choose between marrying one of their gang, Citizen Merri, or face death. The Pimpernel takes on the guise of Citizen Rateau, a tall, cadaverous-looking creature, with sunken eyes and broad, hunched up shoulders and a dry rasping cough that proclaimed the ravages of some mortal disease. Can he rescue Esther and her English lover Jack Kennard from the evil plot?

=== "Needs Must—" ===
Lucile Clamette and her three children are up in front of Commissary Lebel and citizen Chauvelin, who are trying to entrap her former employer, Henri the Vicomte de Montogrueil. Frightened by threats that her children will be sent to a House of Correction on the orders of the Committee of Public Safety, she agrees to write a letter to Henri and his father, the Marquis, as dictated by Chauvelin. The father and son are in possession of some incriminating papers containing evidence of bribes paid to members of the CPS, which have so far allowed them to pass unmolested by the terrorists. If the Marquis hands over the papers they will be soon be arrested and sent to the guillotine but how can he refuse, when Lucile's children are in such danger? Lucile's son runs to the Cabaret de la Liberté to find Citizen Rateau (one of the Pimpernel's recurring alter-egos) and tells him of the family's plight.

=== A Battle of Wits ===
Tournefort, a sleuth-hound employed by the Committee of Public Safety, is hanging around a house in St Lazare one night when he hears a voice talking to a 'Madame la Comtesse' and discussing how the diamonds she has left in her château can be recovered. Realising that this can only be the wife of the Comte de Sucy, he listens for more details then demands entry to the house to confront and arrest the traitors. The concierge tells Tournefort that he is imagining things and assures him he has seen no aristos. Tournefort doesn't believe him but despite searching the lodge, fails to find any evidence. Determined to steal a march on citizen Chauvelin, Tournefort enlists the help of citizen Gourdon and a gang of ruffians (which includes one Citizen Rateau) and they ransack the château looking for the missing jewellery, however Chauvelin has got wind of the scheme and presently appears on the scene...
