= The Emperor's Candlesticks (1937 film) =

1937 film by George Fitzmaurice

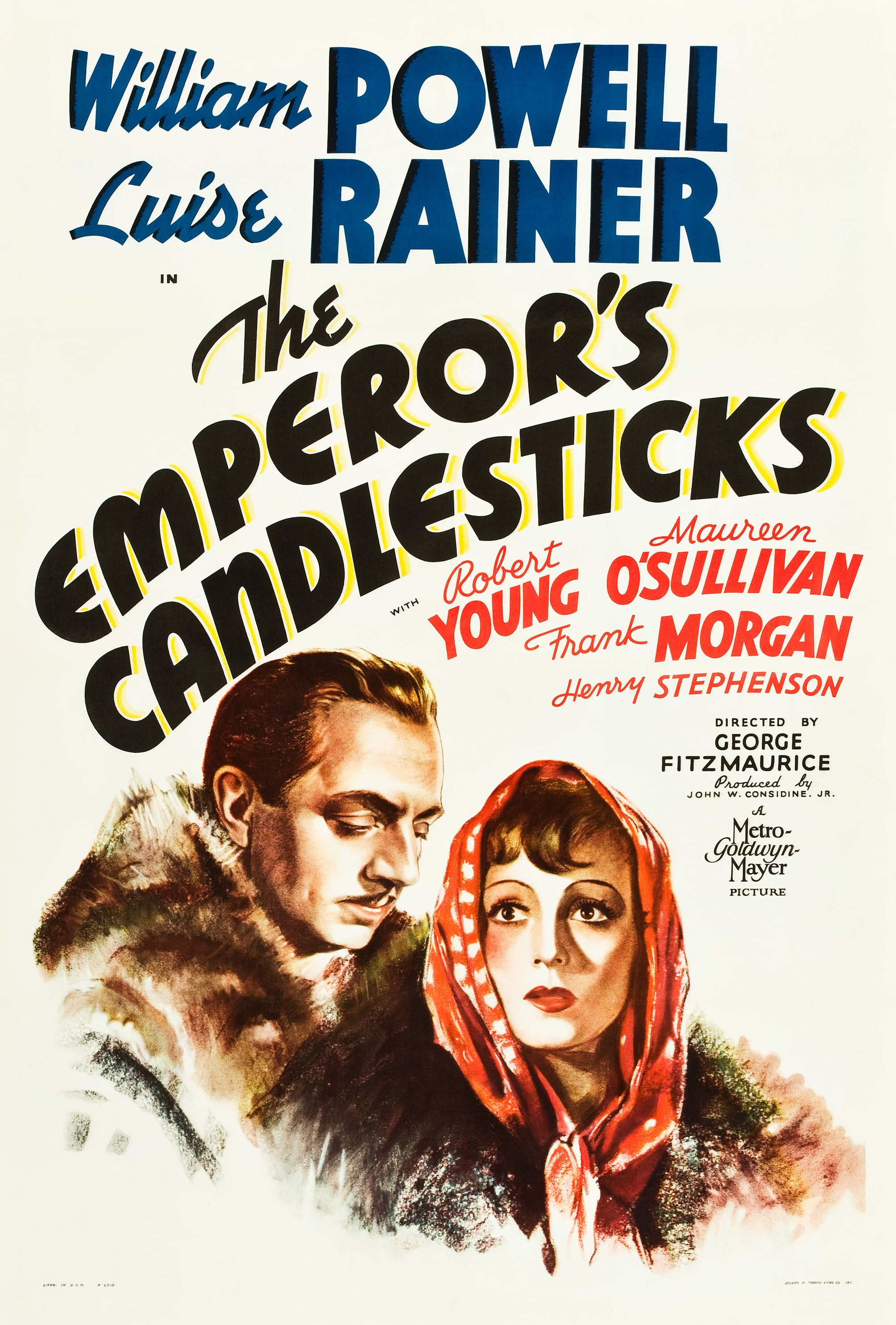
- Theatrical Film Poster
- Directed by: Geo. Fitzmaurice
- Screenplay by: Monckton Hoffe and Harold Goldman
- Based on: The Emperor's Candlesticks; 1899 novel by Baroness Orczy
- Produced by: John W. Considine Jr.
- Starring: William Powell; Luise Rainer
- Cinematography: Harold Rosson; Oliver T. Marsh (uncredited)
- Edited by: Conrad A. Nervig
- Music by: Franz Waxman
- Production company: Metro-Goldwyn-Mayer
- Release date: July 2, 1937 (U.S.)
- Running time: 89 minutes
- Country: United States
- Language: English
- Budget: $620,000
- Box office: $1,333,000

The Emperor's Candlesticks is a 1937 American historical drama film starring William Powell and Luise Rainer and directed by George Fitzmaurice. It is based on the 1899 novel of the same name by Baroness Orczy. The story follows the adventures of spies from opposing sides who fall in love while following the eponymous candlesticks—and the papers hidden inside them—all over turn-of-the-20th-century Europe.

== Plot ==
While visiting Vienna incognito, Russian Grand Duke Peter is lured from a masquerade ball by the beautiful Maria, only to find himself the prisoner of Polish nationalists. Peter is made to write a letter to his father, the tsar of Russia, offering to exchange him for Maria's father, who has been sentenced to be executed.

Because their previous petitions for clemency were intercepted and never reached the Tsar, the Poles task secret agent Baron Stephan Wolensky to deliver the letter. Meanwhile, Colonel Pavloff, head of the Russian secret police, assigns his own agent, Countess Olga Mironova, to take to Russia documents incriminating Wolensky as an enemy agent, along with an order for his arrest.

Since he is already going to Saint Petersburg, Wolensky's friend, Prince Johann, asks him to deliver a pair of ornate candlesticks to a princess. Each of the candlesticks has a secret compartment, so the baron secretly places the letter in one. Later, when Prince Johann amuses Countess Mironova by showing her the candlesticks' unusual feature, she puts her documents inside the other, and persuades the prince to entrust the pair to her. When Wolensky is given the news, he sets off in pursuit.

A complication arises when Mironova's maid, Mitzi Reisenbach, and Mitzi's lover Anton steal her jewelry and the candlesticks. As they trace the candlesticks, first to Paris and then to London, Wolensky and Mironova admit to each other that they are on opposite sides, but this does not prevent them from falling in love.

Finally, the candlesticks are put up for auction. The countess places the winning bid, but since only cash is acceptable as payment, she does not have enough to pay for them. The baron solves the problem by offering to pool their resources, each getting one candlestick. Wolensky chooses what he believes is the one with his letter, but he picks the wrong one. He finds and reads his own death warrant. When Mironova tries to exchange candlesticks, Wolensky declines. She then offers to deliver both sets of documents, while Wolensky remains safely outside Russia. He does not trust her, but knowing the price of her failure, offers to give her back her papers once he has safely delivered Peter's letter.

Meanwhile, the Polish patriots become restless at the long, unexplained delay. Korum favors killing Peter, but Maria persuades the others to wait until they hear from Wolensky. Peter eavesdrops and is pleased. The Tsar pardons and releases Maria's father in exchange for his son.

In St. Petersburg, Pavloff arrests Miranova at her mansion. When Wolensky shows up there with her documents, she tosses them into the fireplace. Pavloff takes them both before the Tsar. The ruler of Russia graciously frees the loving couple, who decide to marry.

== Cast ==
- William Powell as Baron Stephan Wolensky
- Luise Rainer as Countess Olga Mironova
- Robert Young as Grand Duke Peter
- Maureen O'Sullivan as Maria
- Frank Morgan as Colonel Baron Suroff
- Henry Stephenson as Prince Johann
- Bernadene Hayes as Mitzi
- Donald Kirke as Anton
- Douglas Dumbrille as Korum
- Charles Waldron as Dr. Malchor

- Ian Wolfe as Leon
- Barnett Parker as Albert
- Frank Reicher as Pavloff
- Bert Roach as Porter
- Paul Porcasi as Santuzzi
- E. E. Clive as Auctioneer
- Emma Dunn as Housekeeper
- Frank Conroy as Colonel Radoff
- Philo McCullough as Conspirator (uncredited)
- Larry Steers as Conspirator (uncredited)

== Reception ==
According to MGM records the film earned $733,000 in the U.S. and Canada and $600,000 in other markets, resulting in a profit of $259,000.

Bosley Crowther (bylined B.R.C) praised the film in his July 9, 1937, review for The New York Times: “The Baroness Orczy, one of light literature’s most deserving noblewomen, has seldom if ever enjoyed handsomer screen treatment...the producers have breathed debonair life into a shopworn tale of intrigue and espionage, opening the action brilliantly and suddenly as a popping champagne cork at a masked ball in Vienna and taking it on an itinerary of world capitals which includes...a perfectly enchanting St. Petersburg, on which the snow falls in great, soft, downy, Tchekovian flakes – and what if they are corn flakes? A delightful Summer-weight picture, full of romantic encounters in Continental train sheds, the piping of Mittel-Europa locomotives, the amazing old-fashioned simplicity of pre-war European politics, with nothing more complicated than secret documents, hidden compartments in silver candlesticks, black-net dominoes and string orchestras...a picture to take one’s mind off the world and the weather. William Powell is magnificently Polish and baronial...The other people are just as right. Robert Young, as the susceptible son of the czar (who was apparently being difficult in those days about Poland) is a triumph of grand-ducal make-up and bearing; Maureen O’Sullivan, with the tree bark combed out of her hair, is charming and spunky as the Polish beauty...Frank Morgan...is agreeably Frank Morganish; Henry Stevenson...is splendid as what the Soviets would assuredly call a decadent aristocrat. And the list goes on...(T)he story is the old one about the two secret agents who fall in love while engaged on intersecting missions, and depends for its effects on plot manipulations as studied and formal as a ballet, but in this case it is narrated deftly and plausibly with a wealth of purely cinematic embellishments. An inventory of its assets must include rich and tasteful production, directorial finesse, skillful editorial joinery of scene to scene, and casualness and grace of acting—all of which combine to make of “The Emperor’s Candlesticks” one of the pleasantest surprises of the summer.”

== Production ==
According to TCM's Jeremy Arnold: “…it's that glossy star power, given the full MGM treatment, which makes The Emperor's Candlesticks fun to watch.”

Credit for the qualities that won high praise from Bosley Crowther at the time (see above) belongs to: Producer John W. Considine Jr.; Director Geo. Fitzmaurice, assisted by Edward Woehler; Cinematographers Harold Rosson and Oliver T. Marsh (uncredited); Film Editor Conrad A. Nervig; Art Director Cedric Gibbons, assisted by Daniel B. Cathcart and Edwin B. Willis; Costumes by Adrian; Music by Franz Waxman. Writers Harold Goldman, Monckton Hoffe and Herman J. Manckiewiz worked from the novel by Baroness Orczy with additional dialogue provided by Hugh Mills, John Meehan and Erich von Stroheim

This was the third—and last—film co-starring Luise Rainer and William Powell. The first was a romantic comedy titled Escapade (1935). Rainier won the Academy Award for Best Actress for her performance as Anna Held opposite Powell as Florenz Ziegfeld in The Great Ziegfeld (1936).
