= Orci =

- Village
- Coat of arms

- Location of Somogy county in Hungary

- Location of Orci
- Coordinates: 46.40532°N 17.87429°E
- Country: Hungary
- Region: Southern Transdanubia
- County: Somogy
- District: Kaposvár
- RC Diocese: Kaposvár

Area
  - Total: 9.97 km^{2} (3.85 sq mi)

Population (2017)
  - Total: 566
  - Density: 56.8/km^{2} (147/sq mi)
- Demonym: orci
- Time zone: UTC+1 (CET)
  - Summer (DST): UTC+2 (CEST)
- Postal code: 7400
- Area code: (+36) 82
- NUTS 3 code: HU232
- MP: Mihály Witzmann (Fidesz)
- Website: Orci Online

Orci (old spelling: Orczi) is a village in Somogy county, Hungary.
