= The Elusive Pimpernel (novel) =

1908 novel by Baroness Orczy

- 1908 First Edition
- Author: Baroness Orczy
- Language: English
- Genre: Adventure, Historical
- Publisher: Hutchinson & Co, London
- Publication date: 1908
- Publication place: United Kingdom
- Pages: 352
- Preceded by: I Will Repay
- Followed by: Lord Tony's Wife

First published in 1908 by Hutchinson & Co, The Elusive Pimpernel by Baroness Orczy is the 4th book in the classic adventure series about the Scarlet Pimpernel.

A French-language version, translated and adapted by Charlotte and Marie-Louise Desroyses, was also produced under the title Les Nouveaux Exploits du Mouron Rouge.

It was adapted into a silent film The Elusive Pimpernel in 1919.

== Plot summary ==
It is September 1793 and French Agent and chief spy-catcher Chauvelin is determined to get his revenge for the previous humiliations dished out to him at the hands of the Scarlet Pimpernel.

Chauvelin travels to England as an official representative of the French government tasked with looking after the interests of French citizens, but this is only a cover and his real purpose is to trick Sir Percy Blakeney into returning to France, where he can be captured and put to the guillotine.

The plot is hatched at a gala on Richmond Green, with the help of a young French actress, Désirée Candeille, whom Chauvelin has enlisted with promises of money, pardon and fame if she succeeds.

Désirée is manning a tent with a model guillotine under the premise of raising money for the poor of Paris. Marguerite Blakeney enters her stall and starts talking to Désirée. On discovering her to be a fellow French actress, she is soon taken in by the young woman's sob story and before long has invited her to perform at her house in Richmond in front of the Prince of Wales.

Once the offer has been made and accepted, Désirée's official chaperone is revealed as Chauvelin. Marguerite realises she's been set up, but the offer has been made and Sir Percy insists that both of them should come to his house as arranged.

Juliette de Marny (whose rescue by the Scarlet Pimpernel is told in the novel I Will Repay), is staying with them at Blakeney Manor. Chauvelin has managed to get his hands on her family jewels (which were being looked after by the local priest) and has given a diamond necklace, which belonged to Juliette's mother, to Désirée Candeille.

When Désirée turns up at the Blakeney's Richmond mansion wearing the jewels there is a bitter argument between the women. Désirée manages to engineer the situation so that Sir Percy must fight Chauvelin in a duel to avenge the insults levied against her—for which they must go to France, as duelling is outlawed in England.

The following morning Percy leaves Marguerite behind in Richmond and heads for Boulogne. Chauvelin has no intentions of actually fighting the Englishman, but to ensure the Pimpernel cannot escape before he can be captured, Chauvelin sets a further trap for Marguerite who falls for it completely. Before long she has been arrested for attempting to enter France on a false passport, given to her by an apparently apologetic Désirée Candeille, as part of Chauvelin's plot.

With Marguerite in prison and the citizens of Boulogne menaced if she escapes, Chauvelin appears to have a plan that will end the interference of the Scarlet Pimpernel. However, Percy is able to beat his arch-enemy.
