= Sir Percy Leads the Band =

- 1936 first edition
- Author: Baroness Orczy
- Language: English
- Series: The Scarlet Pimpernel
- Genre: Adventure, Historical novel
- Publisher: Hodder & Stoughton
- Publication date: 1936
- Publication place: United Kingdom
- Media type: Print (Hardback & Paperback)
- Pages: 316 pp
- Preceded by: The Scarlet Pimpernel
- Followed by: The League of the Scarlet Pimpernel

First published in 1936, Sir Percy Leads the Band is (chronologically) the second of the Scarlet Pimpernel series by Baroness Orczy.

The novel is set in January and February 1793 and follows on from the original Scarlet Pimpernel book.

== Plot summary ==
The novel opens in Paris in January 1793, against the backdrop of the trial and execution of Louis Capet. The Austrian Baron de Batz—a real historical figure—is plotting to rescue the King and tries to enlist the help of a mysterious, scholarly stranger he knows only as "the Professor", who is in reality Sir Percy Blakeney, the Scarlet Pimpernel, in disguise. Percy refuses to be drawn into de Batz's reckless scheme.

The main action follows the League of the Scarlet Pimpernel as it sets out to save an innocent family from the guillotine, its members disguising themselves as a troupe of shabby, second-rate travelling musicians—the "band" of the title—so as to move freely through Revolutionary France. Their efforts are dogged by Sir Percy's arch-enemy, the agent Chauvelin, who remains bent on revenge for his earlier humiliations.

The Pimpernel's plans are placed in jeopardy by the treachery of a discontented member of the League, Lord St John Devinne, whose betrayal threatens the whole undertaking. Despite the danger, Sir Percy once again outwits Chauvelin and brings the rescue to a successful conclusion.
