= 1915 in literature =

This article contains information about the literary persons, events and publications of 1915.

== Events ==
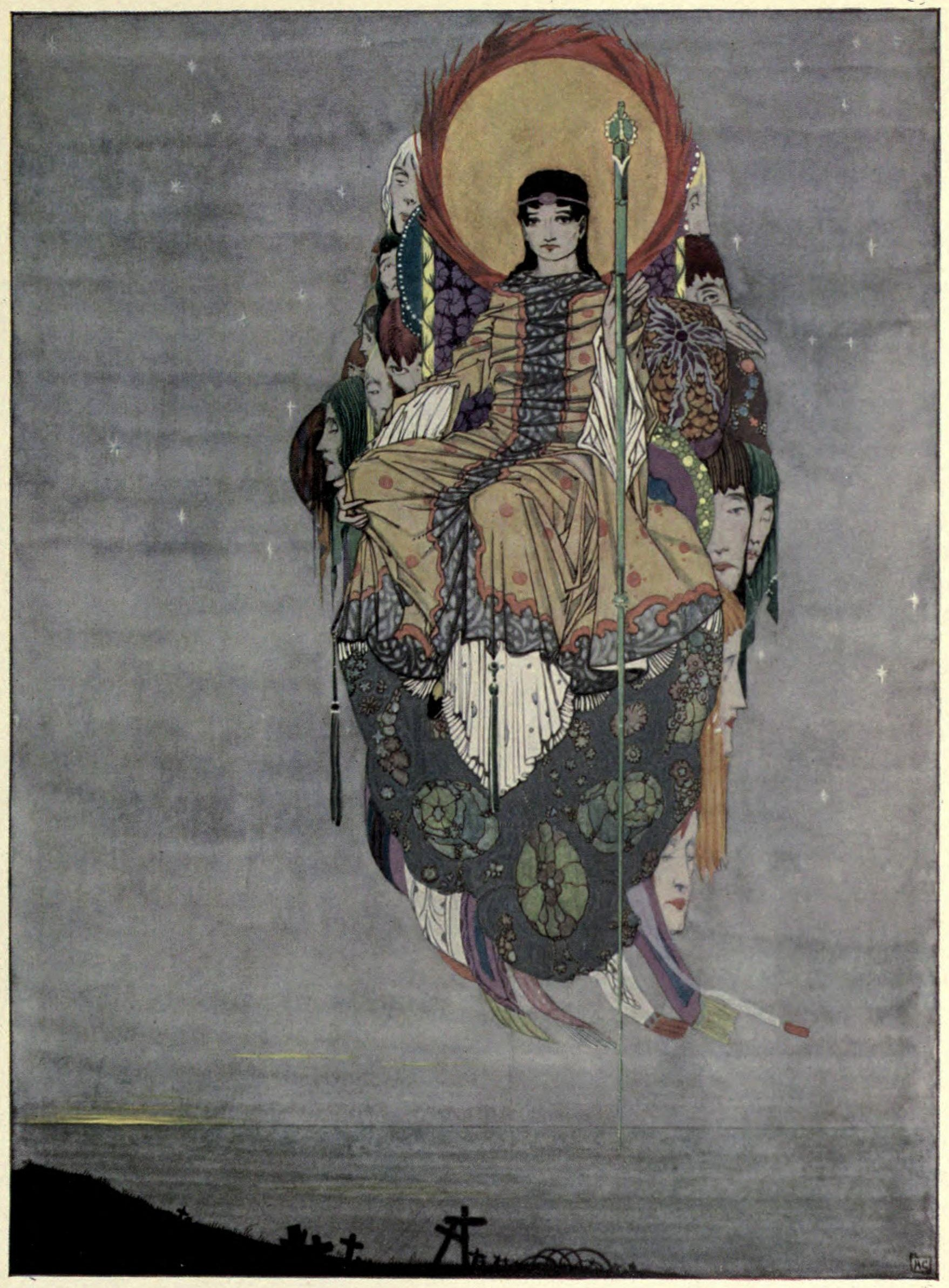
"Honour has come back, as a king, to earth," illustration of "The Dead" by Harry Clarke in The Year's at the Spring, 1920.

- January 13 – "Reminiscences of Sergeant Michael Cassidy", the first known story by Captain H. C. McNeile, Royal Engineers, writing as "Sapper", begins in the Daily Mail (London).
- March – Ford Madox Ford's novel The Good Soldier: A tale of passion is published by John Lane – The Bodley Head in London under this title, and under the author's original name, Ford Madox Hueffer, although he had intended it to be called The Saddest Story.
- March 26 – Virginia Woolf's first novel, The Voyage Out, is published in London by the firm of her half-brother, Gerald Duckworth.
- March 26 – The Geração de Orpheu launch the short-lived magazine Orpheu, introducing literary modernism to Portugal.
- April 6 – The American Ezra Pound's poetry collection Cathay, "translations... for the most part of the Chinese of Rihaku, from the notes of the late Ernest Fenollosa, and the decipherings of the Professors Mori and Ariga", is published in London by Elkin Mathews.
- April 23 – English poet and writer Rupert Brooke, having sailed on February 28 with the British Mediterranean Expeditionary Force for the Gallipoli campaign, dies age 27 on a hospital ship of streptococcal sepsis from an infected mosquito bite off the Greek island of Skyros in the Aegean Sea, where he is buried this evening with fellow poet Patrick Shaw-Stewart in charge of the firing party. Brooke came to public attention as a war poet on March 11 when The Times Literary Supplement published two sonnets ("IV: The Dead" and "V: The Soldier"); the latter was then read from the pulpit of St Paul's Cathedral on Easter Sunday (April 4). His collection of poetry, containing all five sonnets, 1914 & Other Poems, is first published posthumously in May and runs to 11 further impressions this year alone.
- April 24 – Deportation of Armenian notables from Constantinople begins. Among the writers, poets, teachers and literary critics killed are Dikran Chökürian, Armen Dorian, Melkon Giurdjian, Ardashes Harutiunian, Jacques Sayabalian, Ruben Sevak, Siamanto, and Rupen Zartarian. (Survivors include Yervant Odian and Alexander Panossian.)
- May 3 – The rondeau "In Flanders Fields" by the Canadian poet John McCrae is written; it is first published on December 8 in the London magazine Punch.
- May 7 – The sinking of the RMS Lusitania claims 1,198 victims. The Americans among them in this torpedo attack on a civilian passenger liner include the writer and playwright Justus Miles Forman (born 1875), the theatrical producer Charles Frohman (born 1856), the writer and philosopher Elbert Hubbard (born 1856) and his second wife Alice Moore Hubbard (born 1861), and the playwright Charles Klein (born 1867). The survivors include the British-born writer and educator Ian Holbourn and the bookseller Charles E. Lauriat, Jr.
- May 13 – As Julian Grenfell stands talking with other officers, a shell lands some yards away and a splinter hits him in the head. He is taken to a hospital in Boulogne, where he dies 13 days later. His poem "Into Battle" is published in The Times (London) the following day. His younger brother Gerald William (Billy) Grenfell is killed in action two months later.
- c. May – Publication of the first modern book illustrated with wood engravings, Frances Cornford's Spring Morning, from the Poetry Bookshop, London, with engravings by her cousin Gwen Raverat.
- June 24 – The Widener Library at Harvard University is dedicated.
- June 26 – August 14 – P. G. Wodehouse's novel Something Fresh is serialized in The Saturday Evening Post (U.S.), introducing the character of Lord Emsworth of Blandings Castle. It first appears in book form on September 3 in New York, from D. Appleton & Company, and on September 16 in London, from Methuen.
- August/September – John Buchan's thriller The Thirty-Nine Steps, set just before the outbreak of war and introducing as hero Richard Hannay, is serialised in Blackwood's Magazine. Book publication follows in October by William Blackwood and Sons in Edinburgh.
- August–December – Ezra Pound completes the early sections of his poem The Cantos.
- September 15
  - P. G. Wodehouse's story "Extricating Young Gussie" is published in The Saturday Evening Post (U.S.). It introduces as characters Jeeves and Bertie Wooster.
  - New Culture Movement: Chen Duxiu establishes the New Youth magazine in Shanghai, China.
- September 30 – Methuen, publishers of D. H. Lawrence's new novel The Rainbow, are prosecuted in London under the Obscene Publications Act 1857 and its sale is banned. The U.S. edition appears in November without any legal challenge.
- October – Franz Kafka's seminal novella The Metamorphosis (Die Verwandlung) is first published in Die Weißen Blätter (Leipzig). Kafka finishes writing The Trial (Der Process) this year, but it will not be published until 1925, the year after his death.
- October 15 – Detective Story Magazine is first published by Street & Smith of New York, a successor to Nick Carter Stories.
- October 27 – Leonid Andreyev's play He Who Gets Slapped premieres at the Moscow Art Theatre
- November – The German author Heinrich Mann's essay on Émile Zola in Die Weißen Blätter marks Zola's political commitment and attacks the economic causes of the war. This temporarily disrupts Mann's relations with his younger brother, the novelist Thomas Mann.
- unknown dates
  - James Joyce, Tristan Tzara and Vladimir Lenin all take up residence in Zurich, in a coincidence to be exploited in Tom Stoppard's 1974 play Travesties.
  - Alfred A. Knopf, Sr. establishes the publishers Alfred A. Knopf in New York City.
  - The Goudy Old Style serif typeface is created by Frederic Goudy for American Type Founders.

== New books ==
=== Fiction ===
- Ryūnosuke Akutagawa – "Rashōmon" (羅生門, short story published in Teikoku Bungaku)
- Victor Appleton – Tom Swift and His Aerial Warship
- Ruby M. Ayres – Richard Chatterton, V.C.
- Mariano Azuela – The Underdogs (Los de abajo)
- E. F. Benson – The Oakleyites
- John Buchan – The Thirty-nine Steps
- Willa Cather – The Song of the Lark
- Joseph Conrad – Victory
- Arthur Conan Doyle – The Valley of Fear
- Theodore Dreiser – The "Genius"
- Caradoc Evans – My People: Stories of the Peasantry of West Wales
- Edna Ferber – Emma Mc Chesney and Co.
- Ronald Firbank – Vainglory
- Ford Madox Hueffer – The Good Soldier
- Charlotte Perkins Gilman – Herland
- Anna Katharine Green – The Golden Slipper, and Other Problems for Violet Strange
- Hermann Hesse – Knulp
- Franz Kafka – The Metamorphosis
- D. H. Lawrence – The Rainbow
- Jack London – The Little Lady of the Big House
- Marie Belloc Lowndes – Good Old Anna
- Arthur Machen
  - The Bowmen; and Other Legends of the War
  - The Great Return
- Compton Mackenzie – Guy and Pauline
- W. Somerset Maugham – Of Human Bondage
- Oscar Micheaux – The Forged Note: A Romance Of The Darker Races
- Mori Ōgai (森 鷗外) – Sansho the Steward (山椒大夫, Sanshō Dayū)
- John Muir
  - Travels to Alaska
  - Letters to A Friend
- Natsume Sōseki (夏目 漱石) – Grass on the Wayside (道草, Michikusa)
- E. Phillips Oppenheim
  - The Game of Liberty
  - Mr. Grex of Monte Carlo
- Baroness Orczy
  - A Bride of the Plains
  - The Bronze Eagle
- P. D. Ouspensky – Strange Life of Ivan Osokin (Странная жизнь Ивана Осокина)
- Eleanor H. Porter – Pollyanna Grows Up
- Dorothy Richardson – Pointed Roofs
- Sax Rohmer – The Yellow Claw
- Rafael Sabatini – The Sea Hawk
- Ruth Sawyer – The Primrose Ring
- Edgar Wallace
  - The Man Who Bought London
  - The Melody of Death
- Jean Webster – Dear Enemy
- H. G. Wells – Boon
- Luang Wilatpariwat – Khwam mai phayabat (No Vendetta; first full-length Thai novel, adapted from English)
- Harry Leon Wilson – Ruggles of Red Gap
- P. G. Wodehouse
  - Something Fresh
  - Psmith, Journalist
- Virginia Woolf – The Voyage Out

=== Children and young people ===
- Gerdt von Bassewitz – Peter and Anneli's Journey to the Moon (Peterchens Mondfahrt)
- L. Frank Baum
  - The Scarecrow of Oz
  - Aunt Jane's Nieces in the Red Cross (as Edith Van Dyne)
- Waldemar Bonsels – Himmelsvolk (Heaven Folk)
- Edgar Rice Burroughs – The Return of Tarzan
- Russell Thorndike – Doctor Syn: A Tale of the Romney Marsh
- Else Ury
  - Nesthäkchen's First School Year
  - Nesthäkchen in the Children's Sanitorium

=== Drama ===
- Leonid Andreyev – He Who Gets Slapped
- Susan Glaspell – Suppressed Desires
- Maxim Gorky – The Old Man
- Avery Hopwood
  - Fair and Warmer
  - Sadie Love
- Agha Hashar Kashmiri – Bilwamangal
- Cleves Kinkead – Common Clay
- Louis N. Parker – Mavourneen
- Patrick Pearse – The Singer (written)
- Quintero brothers
  - Becquerina
  - Diana cazadora
- Caton Theodorian – Bujoreștii
- Horace Annesley Vachell – The Case of Lady Camber

=== Poetry ===
- C. J. Dennis – The Songs of a Sentimental Bloke (verse novel)
- John Drinkwater – Swords and Ploughshares
- T. S. Eliot – The Love Song of J. Alfred Prufrock
- H. B. Elliott, ed. – Lest We Forget: A War Anthology
- Geoffrey Faber – Interflow, Poems Mainly Lyrical
- Rudyard Kipling – "My Boy Jack"
- Francis Ledwidge – Songs of the Fields
- Vladimir Mayakovsky – A Cloud in Trousers
- Alice Meynell – Poems of the War
- Barbu Nemțeanu – Stropi de soare
- Fernando Pessoa – Opiário and Ode Marítima
- Jessie Pope – Jessie Pope's War Poems and More War Poems

=== Non-fiction ===
- John Hay Beith – The First Hundred Thousand
- John Buchan – Nelson's History of the War (begun)
- Hall Caine – The Drama of 365 Days: Scenes in the Great War
- Maxim Gorky – In the World (В людях)
- Rudyard Kipling – The Fringes of the Fleet (essays and poems)
- Hugo Krabbe – Die moderne staatsidee
- Friedrich Naumann – Mitteleuropa
- May Sinclair – A Journal of Impressions in Belgium
- Percy Sykes – A History of Persia
- Zhonghua Da Zidian (中華大字典) (Great Chinese Dictionary)

== Births ==
- January 1 – Branko Ćopić, Bosnian Serb writer (suicide 1984)
- January 6 – Alan Watts, British/American philosopher (died 1973)
- January 28 – Nien Cheng, Chinese-born American writer (died 2009)
- February 2 – Khushwant Singh, Indian novelist and journalist (died 2014)
- February 11 – Patrick Leigh Fermor, British author (died 2011)
- March 8 – Drue Heinz, born Doreen English, British-American publisher and patron of arts (died 2018)
- March 13 – Protiva Bose (Ranu Shome), Bengali singer and writer (died 2006)
- March 18 – Richard Condon, American novelist (died 1996)
- March 26 – Hwang Sun-won, Korean fiction writer (died 2000)
- April 12 – Július Tomin, Czech writer known for promoting Interlingua (died 2003)
- April 15 – Hilda Bernstein, English-born author, artist, and anti-apartheid activist (died 2006)
- April 24 – Salvador Borrego, Mexican journalist, historical revisionist and neo-Nazi writer (d. 2018)
- May 5 – Emanuel Litvinoff, Anglo-Jewish writer (died 2011)
- May 8 – Milton Meltzer, American historian and author (died 2009)
- May 10 – Monica Dickens, English novelist (died 1992)
- May 12 – Joe David Brown, American novelist and journalist (died 1976)
- May 27 – Herman Wouk, American novelist (died 2019)
- June 10
  - Saul Bellow, American writer (died 2005)
  - Peride Celal, Turkish author (died 2013)
- June 21 – Jesús Arango Cano, Colombian economist, diplomat, anthropologist, archaeologist and writer (died 2015)
- June 22 – Thomas Quinn Curtiss, American writer, and film and theatre critic (died 2000)
- July 1
  - Alun Lewis, Welsh poet in English (died 1944)
  - Jean Stafford, American fiction writer (died 1979)
- July 7 – Margaret Walker, American poet and novelist (died 1998)
- July 14 – Jerome Lawrence, American dramatist (died 2004)
- July 31 – Herbert Aptheker, American historian (died 2003)
- August 13 – Muhammad Ibrahim Joyo, Pakistani teacher, writer, scholar, and Sindhi nationalist (died 2017)
- August 19 – Ring Lardner, Jr., American journalist and screenwriter (died 2000)
- August 28 – Claude Roy, French poet (died 1997)
- August 30 – Jack Simmons, English historian (died 2000)
- September 8 – Benoît Lacroix, Canadian theologian and philosopher (died 2016)
- September 17 – Adolfo Sánchez Vázquez, Spanish-born philosopher (2011)
- September 21 – Gertrude Poe, American journalist (died 2017)
- September 27 – Marjorie Chibnall, English medievalist, biographer and translator (died 2012)
- October 17 – Arthur Miller, American dramatist (died 2005)
- October 24 – Marghanita Laski, English biographer, novelist and broadcaster (died 1988)
- November 8 – G. S. Fraser, Scottish poet and critic (died 1980)
- November 12 – Roland Barthes, French literary theorist (died 1980)
- November 16 – Jean Fritz, American children's writer (died 2017)
- November 26 – Emilio D'Amore, Italian writer, journalist, and politician (died 2017)
- December 6 – Nilawan Pintong, Thai writer (died 2017)
- December 13 – Ross Macdonald, American-Canadian writer (died 1983)
- December 22 – David Martin, Hungarian-born Australian poet (died 1997)
- December 27 – John Cornford, English poet (died 1936)

== Deaths ==
- January 3 – James Elroy Flecker, English poet, novelist and dramatist (tuberculosis, born 1884)
- January 19 – Elizabeth Boynton Harbert, American author, lecturer, reformer (born 1843)
- February 4 – Mary Elizabeth Braddon, English popular novelist (born 1837)
- April 8 – Louis Pergaud, French novelist (killed in action, born 1882)
- April 19 – Julia Evelyn Ditto Young, American poet and novelist (born 1857)
- April 23 – Rupert Brooke, English war poet (blood poisoning, born 1887)
- May 7 (passengers drowned in the sinking of the Lusitania)
  - Justus Miles Forman, American writer (born 1875)
  - Charles Frohman, American theater producer (born 1856)
  - Elbert Hubbard, American writer and philosopher (born 1856)
  - Alice Moore Hubbard, American wife of Elbert Hubbard (born 1861)
  - Charles Klein, American playwright (born 1867)
- May 11 – Lucy Bethia Walford, Scottish-born novelist and artist (born 1845)
- May 26 – Julian Grenfell, English war poet (killed in action, born 1888)
- June 4 – George Calderon, English dramatist and translator (killed in action on Gallipoli campaign, born 1868)
- July 5 – Aurelio Tolentino, Filipino dramatist (born 1867)
- August 19 – Tevfik Fikret, Ottoman Turkish poet and journalist (diabetes, born 1867).
- September 1 – August Stramm, German Expressionist poet and playwright (killed in action, born 1874)
- September 27 – Remy de Gourmont, French Symbolist poet, novelist, and critic (stroke, born 1858)
- October 17 – Edmond Laforest, Haitian French-language poet (suicide, born 1876)
- November 14 – Booker T. Washington, American writer and educator (born 1856)
- December 23 – Roland Leighton, English war poet (died of wounds, born 1895)

== Awards ==
- Nobel Prize for Literature: Romain Rolland (French)

== See also ==
- World War I in literature
