= Bealby =

1915 comic novel by H. G. Wells

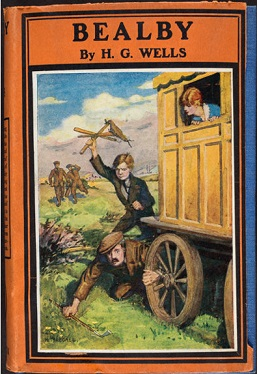
- First edition
- Author: H. G. Wells
- Original title: Bealby: A Holiday
- Language: English
- Genre: Novel
- Publisher: Methuen Publishing
- Publication date: 1915
- Publication place: United Kingdom
- Pages: 291
- Preceded by: Boon
- Followed by: The Research Magnificent

Bealby: A Holiday is a 1915 comic novel by H. G. Wells.

== Plot summary ==
Bealby is the story of the escapade of a thirteen-year-old boy when he rebels against his placement as a steward's-room boy in the great house of an estate named Shonts (his stepfather, Mr. Darling is a gardener there) and flees—not, however, before thoroughly upsetting a weekend party where the nouveau riche couple renting Shonts is entertaining the Lord Chancellor. Bealby's week-long "holiday" has three phases.

First, he is taken up by three women in a caravan, one of whom, Madeleine Philips, is a well-known actress whose beauty inspires in Bealby an adoring infatuation. Miss Philips is also the lover of Captain Douglas, a guest at Shonts who has been wrongly blamed for wrecking the weekend party there. Captain Douglas believes he must capture Bealby and use his testimony to exonerate himself in the Lord Chancellor's eyes. Still, when Bealby gets wind of this, he flees—not before accidentally wrecking the party's bulky, yellow caravan.

Bealby then falls in with Billy Bridget, an amoral tramp who takes his money and persuades him to commit a burglary. This goes awry, and Bealby runs away. But he is recognized as a runaway when he buys a meal in Crayminster. Bealby escapes, but not before the attempt to catch him has wrought havoc in the town.

Bealby's spirit of revolt is now thoroughly cowed, and when he chances upon Captain Douglas, who has been looking for him, he offers no resistance. Douglas takes him to London, but through no fault of Bealby's, the effort to exonerate the captain in the eyes of the Lord Chancellor fails miserably.

The novel concludes with Captain Douglas renouncing his passion for Madeleine Philips and a contrite Bealby returning to Shonts and telling his mother he is willing to "'have another go" at a career in domestic service.

== Themes ==
In addition to evoking the author's early revolt from the modest circumstances into which he was born, Bealby satirizes a variety of features of English life on the eve of World War I. These include the popularity of Hegelianism of the British Idealist school (the Lord Chancellor is an amateur philosopher), the fashion of weekend parties, the cultivation of wealthy patrons by political parties, the ill-prepared state of the British military, and the egotism of small entrepreneurs (represented by Mr. Benshaw, a Crayminster horticulturalist).

== Composition and critical views ==
Wells modeled Captain Douglas on J. W. Dunne, an aeronautical engineer whom he had befriended and encouraged in 1902.

In a preface to the English edition (omitted from the U.S. edition) dedicating the book to Richard Burdon Haldane, Great Britain's Lord Chancellor. Wells warned that his book's Lord Chancellor was not "meant for him." He was, but in wartime, Wells wished to pay homage to Haldane's work as Secretary of War from 1905 to 1912.

H.G. Wells wrote Bealby while also working on The Research Magnificent and Boon. It was serialized in England in Grand Magazine from August 1914 to March 1915, and in the United States in Collier's beginning with the 20 June 1914 issue.

Biographer David C. Smith considers Bealby "a hilarious book" but a "neglected" one. For Michael Sherborne, Bealby, Bridget, and Douglas represent various "aspects of Wells."
