= The New Paul and Virginia =

1878 novel by William Hurrell Mallock

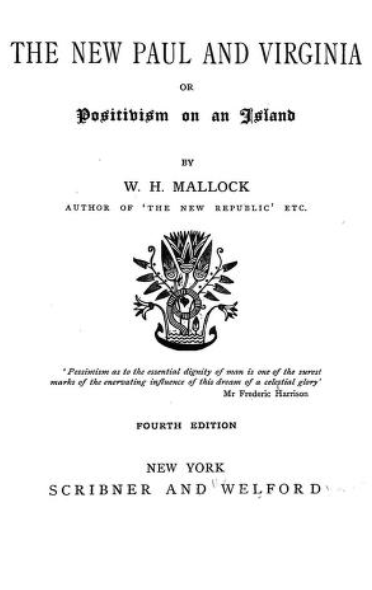
- Title page for The New Paul and Virginia (Fourth edition)
- Author: William Hurrell Mallock
- Language: English
- Genre: Satire; Dystopian fiction
- Publisher: Chatto & Windus
- Publication date: 1878
- Publication place: United Kingdom
- Media type: Print (Hardcover)
- Pages: 144 pp.

The New Paul and Virginia, or Positivism on an Island is a satirical dystopian novel written by William Hurrell Mallock, first published in 1878. It belongs to the wave of utopian and dystopian literature of the late nineteenth century in both Great Britain and the United States.

== Satire ==
Mallock derives the title of his book from Jacques-Henri Bernardin de Saint-Pierre's 1787 novel Paul et Virginie. As in that book, Mallock includes a shipwreck and a tropical island, though his satirical outlook is far from Saint-Pierre's earnest idealism.

As his subtitle indicates, Mallock targets the Positivist and Utilitarian thinking of his era for satirical attack, name dropping John Stuart Mill, Auguste Comte, Frederic Harrison, John Tyndall, and Thomas Henry Huxley in the body of the text. Consistent with his other works, like his satirical novel The New Republic (1878), Mallock's stance is that of a conservative and a religious believer. One critic summarized his position: "Comically, but ruthlessly, Mallock exposes the moral vacuity he believes to lie behind the positivist creed," reducing it to "utter absurdity...."

To support his satire, Mallock closes the novel with a ten-page collection of 29 quotations from positivist and liberal thinkers and writers of Mallock's era, including eleven quotes from Tyndall and nine from Harrison, plus five from Huxley and two each from Harriet Martineau and William Kingdon Clifford.

== Synopsis ==
The novel opens with the introduction of its title characters. The heroine is "the superb Virginia St. John," a celebrated beauty, famous for being famous. At the age of thirty she is the newlywed wife of an English bishop. The hero (the term has to be applied satirically) is Prof. Paul Darnley, a prominent intellectual:

"He had written three volumes on the origin of life, which he had spent seven years in looking for in hay and cheese; he had written five volumes on the entozoa of the pig, and two volumes of lectures, as a corollary to these, on the sublimity of human heroism and the whole duty of man. He was renowned all over Europe and America as a complete embodiment of enlightened modern thinking. He criticised everything; he took nothing on trust, except the unspeakable sublimity of the human race and its august terrestrial destinies."

Both characters are traveling abroad the steamship Australasian, sailing from Melbourne to London; Virginia is on her way to Chausible Island to meet her new husband, while Paul is journeying home to his elderly wife, whom he has been avoiding for the past eighteen months. (Mrs. Prof. Darnley has an irrational determination to convince her atheist and materialist husband of the existence of Hell.) On the voyage, Paul lectures on his value system, which is essentially Comte's "Religion of Humanity," and manages to convince many passengers and crew of the truth of his outlook (though Virginia does not listen to him).

An approaching storm inspires the crew to load the ship's cutter with survival supplies, including tinned meats and cases of champagne. The storm passes, but the ship's boiler suddenly explodes; the Australasian quickly sinks with the loss of almost all on board.

Paul and Virginia manage to reach a nearby island in the cutter. (Shipwreck on a deserted island, as a start for a new and better society, is a staple of the utopian genre, as in the Spensonia books of Thomas Spence, etc.) Paul conveniently finds a deserted house built from wreckage; it is a comfortable and neatly furnished cottage, and the two survivors move in. Virginia is deeply distraught over their recent tragedy, but her state of mind improves when she realizes that the largest trunk in her luggage is on the cutter. The tinned meats and champagne also come in handy.

Two other survivors appear: an English clergyman who has been converted to Positivism by Paul, and an elderly woman. The latter soon dies, giving Paul and the clergyman opportunity to debate the meaning of her death from the Positivist viewpoint. Paul keeps himself busy searching for the missing link. Liberated from the trammels of traditional culture and belief, Paul confidently expects pace Rosseau instant attainment of the sublime happiness which is the natural state of free human beings.

The clergyman proves to be an inconvenient convert, however; he spends his time getting drunk and trying to kiss Virginia, and Paul's intellectual arguments have little influence on him. Physical intimidation is more effective, since the clergyman is both a "coward" and a "weakling." When the drunken clergyman falls off a cliff, Paul meditates on the utilitarian aspects of his death. Paul eventually converts Virginia; she gives up her religious faith, and replaces it with a sexual desire for Paul –which the intellectual Paul finds very uncomfortable. In her new commitment to "glorious truth", whatever it may be, Virginia snoops through Paul's private papers, which had survived the shipwreck, and discovers his secret: he himself was once a clergyman.

By the final chapter of the story, Paul is reduced to baying at the Moon. His howls attract the notice of another couple. The woman turns out to be Paul's wife, who has come searching for her errant husband. And the man, correspondingly, is Virginia's husband the Bishop. And as it happens the island on which Paul and Virginia landed is none other than Chausible Island, her destination, and the cottage they've been occupying was prepared by the Bishop for Virginia. At the end of the book, Paul discovers that his wife has attained her goal: he now believes in Hell.
