= 1878 in literature =

This article contains information about the literary events and publications of 1878.

== Events ==
Front page of the first issue of the Yale Daily News, then called The Yale News, published January 28, 1878.

- January 28 – The Yale News becomes the first daily college newspaper in the United States.
- June – Robert Louis Stevenson's three linked detective fiction short stories The Suicide Club begin publication in The London Magazine. The stories feature Prince Florizel of Bohemia and his sidekick Colonel Geraldine, who infiltrate a secret society of people intent on losing their lives.
- June 10 – Konrad Korzeniowski, the future English-language novelist Joseph Conrad, sets foot on British soil for the first time, at Lowestoft from the SS Mavis.
- July – The Scottish poetaster William McGonagall, a self-described "poet and tragedian", journeys on foot from Dundee to Balmoral Castle over mountainous terrain and through a thunderstorm in a fruitless attempt to perform his verse before Queen Victoria.
- August 3 – Guy de Maupassant writes to Gustave Flaubert, complaining about his monotonous life and his new job as an employee of the Ministry of Public Instruction in France.
- October – The Peabody Institute Library (later George Peabody Library) opens to the public in Baltimore, Maryland.
- December 30 – Henry Irving's production of Hamlet, with himself in the title rôle playing opposite Ellen Terry as Ophelia, opens at the Lyceum Theatre, London (of which they have taken over the management).
- unknown dates
  - Anton Chekhov writes his first substantial play, known as Platonov, but it is not completed, titled, performed or published in his lifetime.
  - The Johns Hopkins University Press is established in Baltimore, Maryland, as the University Publication Agency, making it the oldest continuously operating university press in the United States.
  - The Remington No. 2 typewriter, the first with a shift key enabling production of lower as well as upper case characters, is introduced in the United States.

== New books ==
=== Fiction ===
- William Harrison Ainsworth – Beatrice Tyldesley
- Mary Elizabeth Braddon – An Open Verdict
- Wilkie Collins – The Haunted Hotel
- José Maria de Eça de Queiroz – Cousin Bazilio (O Primo Basílio)
- Theodor Fontane – Vor dem Sturm (Before the Storm)
- Anna Katharine Green – The Leavenworth Case
- Thomas Hardy – The Return of the Native (serialized in Belgravia)
- Henry James
  - Daisy Miller
  - The Europeans
- William Hurrell Mallock
  - The New Paul and Virginia
  - The New Republic
- Ellen Buckingham Mathews (as Helen Mathers) – Cherry Ripe
- Margaret Oliphant – The Primrose Path
- Anne Eliza Smith – Seola
- Robert Louis Stevenson
  - The Suicide Club
  - The Rajah's Diamond
- Leo Tolstoy – Anna Karenina («Анна Каренина», book publication)
- Émile Zola – Une Page d'amour

=== Children and young people ===
- Randolph Caldecott – The House that Jack Built
- Hector Malot – Sans Famille (Nobody's Boy)
- Jules Verne – Dick Sand, A Captain at Fifteen (Un Capitaine de quinze ans)
- Evelyn Whitaker – Miss Toosey's Mission. A Tale

=== Drama ===
- Ion Luca Caragiale – A Stormy Night (O noapte furtunoasă sau Numĕrul 9)
- José Echegaray – En el pilar y en la cruz (The Stake and the Cross)
- W. S. Gilbert – The Ne'er-do-Weel

=== Poetry ===
- Aleksey Konstantinovich Tolstoy – The Dream of Councillor Popov

=== Non-fiction ===
- François Callet – Tantara ny Andriana eto Madagasikara
- Richard Jefferies – The Gamekeeper at Home
- Friedrich Nietzsche – Human, All Too Human (Menschliches, Allzumenschliches)
- Robert Louis Stevenson – An Inland Voyage

== Births ==
- January 4 – A. E. Coppard, English short story writer and poet (died 1957)
- January 6 – Carl Sandburg, American poet and historian (died 1967)
- January 12 – Ferenc Molnár (Ferenc Neumann), Hungarian playwright and novelist (died 1952)
- March 14 – Victor Bridges, English novelist, playwright and poet (died 1972)
- April 15 – Robert Walser, Swiss author and poet writing in German (died 1956)
- June 1 – John Masefield, English poet (died 1967)
- June 12 – James Oliver Curwood, American author (died 1927)
- August 2 – Berta Ruck, Indian-born Welsh romantic novelist (died 1978)
- August 10 – Louis Esson, Scottish-born Australian poet and playwright (died 1943)
- September 20 – Upton Sinclair, American novelist (died 1968)
- September 22 – F. J. Harvey Darton English children's literature historian and publisher (died 1936)
- November 25 – Georg Kaiser, German dramatist (died 1945)
- December 15 – Hans Carossa, German novelist and poet (died 1956)

== Deaths ==
- January 8 – Nikolay Nekrasov, Russian poet (born 1821)
- January 19 – Ede Szigligeti, Hungarian dramatist (born 1814)
- February 1 – George Cruikshank, English illustrator (born 1792)
- April 24 – Heinrich Leo, Prussian historian (born 1799)
- April 25 – Anna Sewell, English novelist (born 1820)
- May 28 – Sophie de Choiseul-Gouffier, Lithuanian novelist (born 1790)
- July 1 – Catherine Winkworth, English translator (born 1827)
- July 17 – Aleardo Aleardi, Italian poet (born 1812)
- August 13
  - George Gilfillan, Scottish poet and author (born 1813)
  - Elizabeth Prentiss, American poet and hymnist (born 1818)
- November 3 – Frances Freeling Broderip (née Hood), English children's writer
- November 17 – Karl Theodor Keim, German theologian (born 1825)
- November 20 – William Thomas, Welsh-language poet (born 1832)
- December 5 – George Whyte-Melville, Scottish-born novelist (hunting accident, born 1821)
- December 19 – Bayard Taylor, American poet (born 1825)
- December 31 – Giulietta Pezzi, Italian novelist, journalist, and poet (born 1810)

== Awards ==
- Newdigate prize – Oscar Wilde, "Ravenna"
