= Boon (novel) =

1915 work of literary satire by H. G. Wells

- First edition
- Author: H. G. Wells
- Original title: Boon, The Mind of the Race, the Wild Asses of the Devil, and The Last Trump: Being a First Selection from the Literary Remains of George Boon, Appropriate to the Times, Prepared for Publication by Reginald Bliss, with an Ambiguous Introduction by H.G. Wells
- Language: English
- Subject: Satire
- Publisher: T. Fisher Unwin
- Publication date: 1915
- Publication place: United Kingdom
- Pages: 345
- Preceded by: The War That Will End War
- Followed by: Bealby

Boon is a 1915 work of literary satire by H. G. Wells. It purports, however, to be by the fictional character Reginald Bliss, and for some time after publication Wells denied authorship. Boon is best known for its part in Wells's debate on the nature of literature with Henry James, who is caricatured in the book. But in Boon Wells also mocks himself, calling into question and ridiculing a notion he held dear—that of humanity's collective consciousness.

== Summary ==
Boon opens with an introduction by Wells, calling it "an indiscreet, ill-advised book." Wells pretends to repudiate any public identification with the work: "Bliss is Bliss and Wells is Wells. And Bliss can write all sorts of things that Wells could not do."

As he was to do in The Research Magnificent, published the same year, Wells creates a literary character (Reginald Bliss) who is making a book out of the literary remains of an author who has recently died (George Boon, a popular author of books and plays). Bliss attributes Boon's death to depression on account of the war. Bliss expresses disappointment that among Boon's papers (kept in "barrels in the attic") he has found "nothing but fragments" and "a curious abundance of queer little drawings," many of which are reproduced'.

The principal text by Boon that he presents is titled The Mind of the Race, which is "the singularly vivid and detailed and happily quite imaginary account of the murder of that eminent littérateur, Dr. Tomlinson Keyhole." Bliss also recounts conversations about the themes of this work which he has had with Boon and with Edwin Dodd, "a leading member of the Rationalist Press Association, a militant agnostic," and later with an author named Wilkins.

The principal philosophical theme engaged in Boon is whether such a thing as "the Mind of Humanity" can be said to exist, or whether, as Dodd believes, such a notion is "mysticism."

In the unfinished work Boon was planning, a character named Hallery is "fanatically obsessed by this idea of the Mind of the Race," as indeed Wells was himself. He is imagined lecturing unsuccessfully at a conference on the subject at a seaside villa that Henry James attends. Chapter 4 of Boon is largely a frontal assault on Henry James's late manner, and contains long pastiches of his style. James's belief that a novel should have unity is vigorously attacked, as are his characters ("eviscerated people he has invented" who "never make lusty love, never go to angry war, never shout at an election or perspire at poker," but only "nose out suspicions, hint by hint, link by link"). Chapter 5 mocks other writers, especially George Bernard Shaw, and includes an outline of a paper on "The Natural History of Greatness, with especial reference to Literary Reputations" that shows that some of Wells's critical notions were far ahead of his time. Wells's stand-in Hallery argues for an expansion of the concept of literature that anticipates future critical developments. Chapter 6 analyses the resistance Hallery's quasi-religious concept of the institution of literature inspires, even in Hallery himself. Chapter 7 criticises the thought of Friedrich Nietzsche and lambastes Houston Stewart Chamberlain's pro-German 1899 book The Foundations of the Nineteenth Century.

Boon concludes with two humorous symbolic tales entitled "The Wild Asses of the Devil" and "The Last Trump." The latter tale engages theological themes that Wells would soon be developing in a serious vein in God the Invisible King (1917).

== Background ==
H.G. Wells and Henry James had been friends since the mid-1890s and held each other in high esteem. But in the years preceding the war they fell out, in part because Wells resented James and his friends refusing to review Rebecca West's book about him in the Times Literary Supplement, and in part over their differing aesthetic doctrines, with Wells arguing for a vigorous new realism that engaged "contemporary social development" in all its aspects, and James arguing that such an approach was a prostitution of art.

Wells's work was in part modelled on W. H. Mallock's The New Republic (1877). He had been working on the manuscript since at least 1905, and "as the Germans drove toward Paris in 1914, he had recast the book, inserted the death of Boon, and released it. As he remarked, 'In many respects it is the most frank and intimate book that he is ever likely to write. And yet—esoteric."

== Reception ==
Henry James was offended by Boon and an exchange of letters ensued. The book was lauded, however, by Maurice Baring and Hugh Walpole.

The episodes which might induce a puzzled librarian to class the book as fiction are few, and only one of them (in addition to the parody on Henry James) rises to exceptional heights. But this, 'The Last Trump,' is a satire so audacious, yet so effective, that it alone should give the book a permanent repute.
