= New Arabian Nights =

1882 short story collection by Robert Louis Stevenson

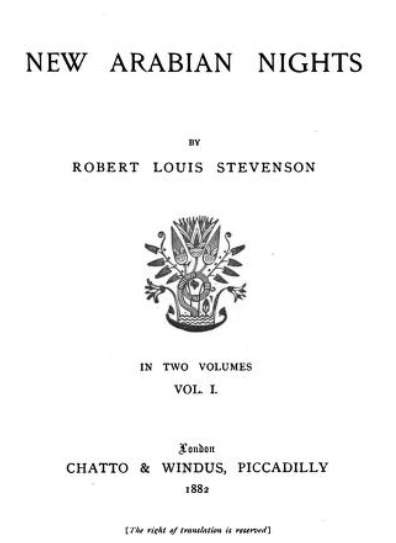
- Title page for New Arabian Nights (1882)
- Author: Robert Louis Stevenson
- Language: English
- Genre: Short stories
- Publisher: Chatto & Windus
- Publication date: 1882
- Publication place: Scotland
- Media type: Print (Hardback & Paperback)
- Followed by: More New Arabian Nights: The Dynamiter

New Arabian Nights by Robert Louis Stevenson, first published in 1882, is a collection of short stories previously published in magazines between 1877 and 1880. The collection contains Stevenson's first published fiction, and a few of the stories are considered by some critics to be his best work, as well as pioneering works in the English-language short story tradition.

== Structure ==
New Arabian Nights is divided into two volumes.

Volume 1

The first volume contains seven stories originally called Later-day Arabian Nights and published by London Magazine in serial format from June to October 1878. It is composed of two story groups, or cycles:

- "The Suicide Club"
- "The Rajah's Diamond"

Volume 2

The second volume is a collection of four unconnected (standalone) stories that were previously published in magazines:

- "The Pavilion on the Links" (1880), told in 9 mini-chapters
- "A Lodging for the Night" (1877)
- "The Sire De Malétroits Door" (1877)
- "Providence and the Guitar" (1878)

== Allusions to other works ==
The title is an allusion to the collection of tales known as the One Thousand and One Nights, which Stevenson had read and liked. Although Stevenson's stories were set in modern Europe, he was stylistically drawing a connection to the nested structure of the Arabian tales.

As in A Thousand and One Nights, where we have a caliph named Harun the Orthodox, who wanders through the streets of Baghdad in disguise, here in The New Arabian Nights by Stevenson, we have Prince Florizel of Bohemia, who wanders through the streets of London in disguise.

— Jorge Luis Borges

Two eagerly awaited translations of the Arabian Nights, by Richard F. Burton and John Payne, were in the works in the late 1870s and early 1880s, further helping to draw popular attention to Stevenson's "New" title.

== Literary significance and criticism ==
"A Lodging for the Night" was Stevenson's first ever published fiction. In 1890 Arthur Conan Doyle characterized "The Pavilion on the Links" as "the high-water mark of Stevenson's genius" and "the first short-story in the world". Barry Menikoff (1987) considers New Arabian Nights to be the starting point in the history of the English-language short story.
