= Arnulph Mallock =

Arnulph Henry Reginald Mallock, FRS (12 March 1851 – 26 June 1933) was a British scientific instrument designer and experimentalist.

He was born in Cheriton Bishop, Devon the son of the Revd. William and Margaret (née Froude) Mallock. His father was Rector of Cheriton Bishop. He and his brother William Hurrell Mallock were educated at home and then from the age of 11 to 16 at a school in Harlow, Essex. After a further period of private tutoring he went up to St Edmund's Hall, Oxford.

After a few years assisting his uncle, William Froude, a naval architect, to build the first ship test tank he went to work for four months with Lord Rayleigh as an experimental assistant.

His interests and projects were manifold. The military and the Railway Companies constantly sought his help. Amongst many other commissions he designed equipment to measure earth tremors caused by railways, slight movements in St Paul's cathedral and several bridges. He was a civilian member of the Ordnance Committee and tackled many problems of ballistics and the design of ordnance.

He was elected a Fellow of the Royal Society in 1903. His candidature citation read: "Consulting Engineer. An original investigator and experimentalist in various branches of physical science, who has invented and improved many instruments of high scientific value. Author of the following papers: 'Measurement of a Body under Strain' (Proc Roy Soc, No 197, 1879); 'Action of Cutting Tools' (ibid No 217, 1881); 'Shape of Drilled Holes' (ibid, No 226, 1883); 'Viscosity of water' (ibid, vol 45, 1888); 'Properties of Indian Rubber' (ibid, vol 46, 1889); 'Young's Modulus for Crystals' (ibid, vol 49, 1891); 'Instability of Distended Tubes' (ibid); 'Insect Sight' (ibid, vol 55, 1893). Experiments on 'Fluid Viscosity' (Phil Trans, vol 187(A), 1896). Also of Papers published in Reports, Brit Assoc; Trans Inst Nav Arch; and other Scientific Journals, &c." A supplementary citation read: "The skill and insight exhibited by Mr Mallock in work done for the Vibration Committee appointed about two years ago by the Board of Trade was acknowledged in highly laudatory terms in the Report of the Committee. In 1907, he published a paper on what would later be known as the von Karman vortex street. He served on the Council of the Royal Society from 1910-1912.

In 1904 he married Helena Maria Caroline Finlay of Castle Toward. At Mallock's death an editor explained, "He was an esteemed contributor to our correspondence columns, yet, on account of his dislike for publicity, few personal details were known concerning him, and no one felt able, therefore, to deal adequately with his life and work."

A contributor Cottesloe wrote, "He had great musical gifts and an amazing memory which made his conversation full of interest." After his death his widow presented the Royal Society with the sextant that had belonged to Brunel.

== Flow between rotating cylinders ==
In 1896 Mallock published his observations of fluid flow in a ring vessel with the inner cylinder rotating, thus imparting motion to a fluid. This experimental set up was also used by Maurice Couette and later by G. I. Taylor so that today the various flow regimes are named Taylor–Couette flow. According to a review in 2023, Mallock "found the centrifugal instability that occurs when the inner cylinder rotates with the outer cylinder at rest ... Apparently, though, Mallock did not consider low enough rotational speeds to observe stable flow with the inner cylinder rotating." This regime is laminar flow as each radial lamina has an angular velocity.

== Selected works ==
- 1896: "III. Experiments on fluid viscosity", Philosophical Transactions of the Royal Society doi:10.1098/rsta.1896.0003

A selection of works from Proceedings of the Royal Society of London:

- 1907: "On the resistance of air" doi:10.1098/rspa.1907.0038
- 1911: "Influence of viscosity on the stability of the flow of fluids" doi:10.1098/rspa.1911.0002
- 1911: "Note on the iridescent colours of birds and insects" doi:10.1098/rspa.1911.0073
- 1919: "Note on the elasticity of metals as affected by temperature" doi:10.1098/rspa.1919.0020
- 1918: "Growth of trees, with a note on interference bands formed by rays at small angles" doi:10.1098/rspa.1918.0009

The following were published in Nature:

- Nov 6, 1873: "Harmonic Echos" Nature 9: 6
- Aug 24, 1876: "Visual Phenomena", Nature 14: 350,1
- Aug 10, 1894: "Note on the behaviour of a rotating cylinder in a steady current", "Mechanics at the British Association", Nature 50: 437
