= The Rajah's Diamond =

1878 short story cycle by Robert Louis Stevenson

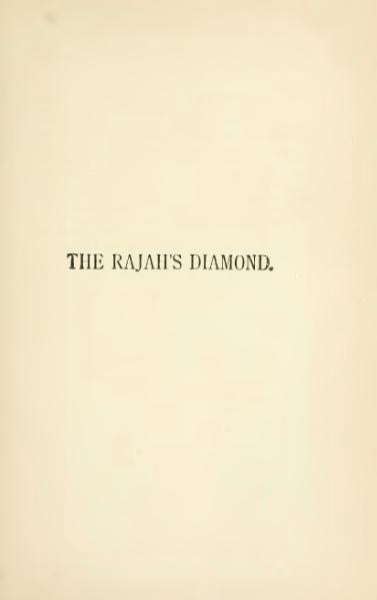
- The Rajah's Diamond on "New Arabian Nights"
- Author: Robert Louis Stevenson
- Language: English
- Series: Later-day Arabian Nights
- Genre: Detective fiction short story
- Publisher: London Magazine
- Publication date: June–October 1878
- Publication place: Scotland
- Media type: Print (Periodical)
- Preceded by: The Suicide Club

The Rajah's Diamond is a cycle of four short stories by Robert Louis Stevenson. First published in 1878 in a serial periodical London Magazine, they were republished in the first volume of New Arabian Nights. The stories are:

- "Story of the Bandbox"
- "Story of the Young Man in Holy Orders"
- "Story of the House with the Green Blinds"
- "The Adventure of Prince Florizel and a Detective"

== Adaptations ==
Dramafilms released a movie entitled The Tame Cat (1921), based on these stories, directed by Will H. Bradley and starring Marion Harding and Ray Irwin.

On the 24 November 1979 BBC Wales broadcast an operatic adaptation for television of The Rajah's Diamond (1979) by Alun Hoddinott, starring Geraint Evans and featuring the BBC National Orchestra of Wales.

A Soviet adaptation titled The Suicide Club, or the Adventures of a Titled Person was released in 1981.

== Publication history ==
- Stevenson, Robert Louis (1878). The Rajah's Diamond (June–October ed.). UK: London Magazine.
- Stevenson, Robert Louis (September 1991). The Rajah's Diamond (Hardcover ed.). USA: Carroll & Graf. ISBN 0-88184-741-0.
