= The White Circle =

1920 film by Maurice Tourneur

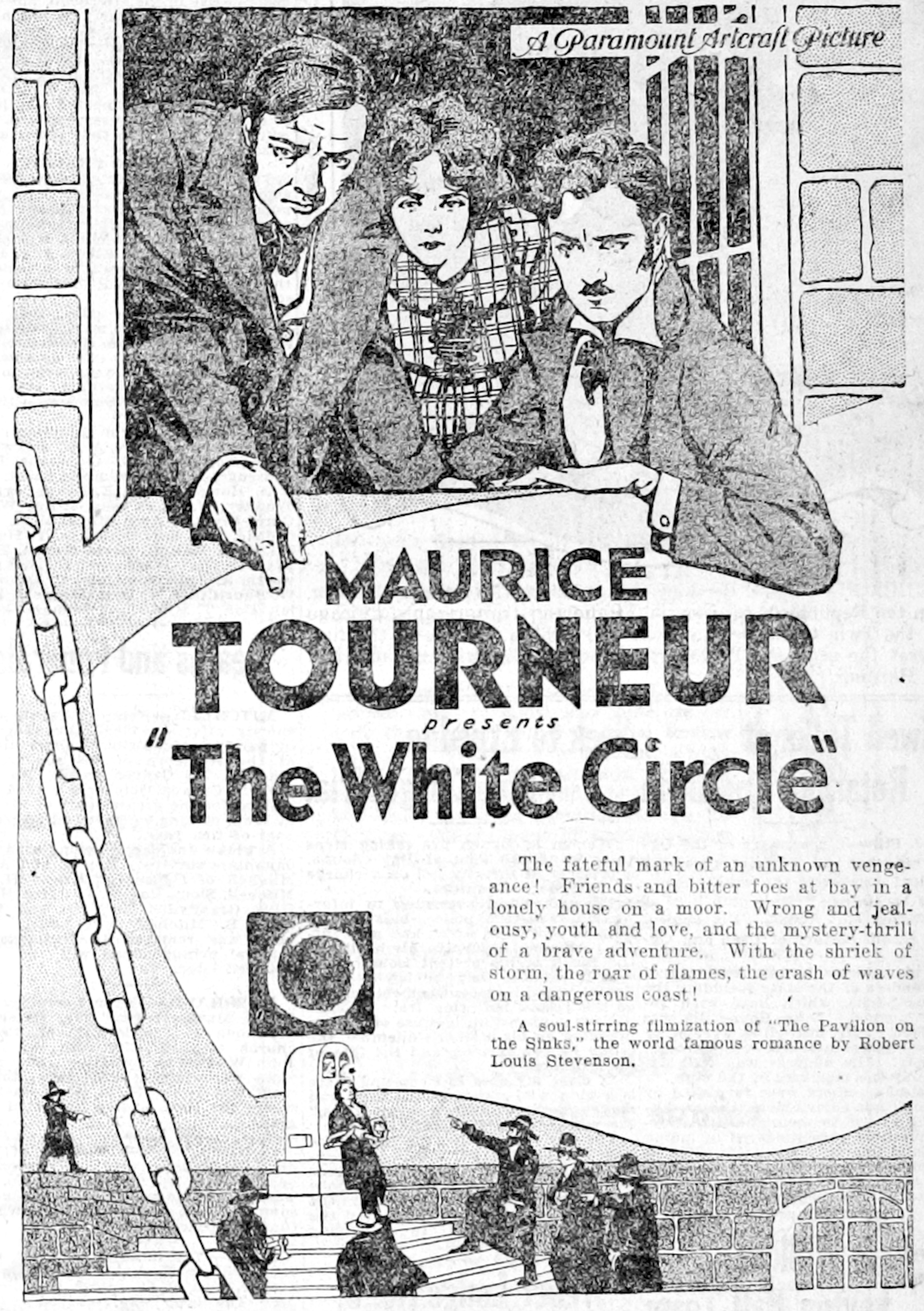
- Newspaper advertisement
- Directed by: Maurice Tourneur
- Screenplay by: John Gilbert; Jules Furthman
- Based on: "The Pavilion on the Links" by Robert Louis Stevenson
- Produced by: Maurice Tourneur
- Starring: Spottiswoode Aitken; Janice Wilson; Harry Northrup; John Gilbert; Wesley Barry; Jack McDonald
- Cinematography: Alfred Ortlieb; Charles Rosher
- Production companies: Maurice Tourneur Productions; Famous Players–Lasky Corporation
- Distributed by: Paramount Pictures
- Release date: August 22, 1920
- Running time: 50 minutes
- Country: United States
- Language: Silent (English intertitles)

The White Circle is a lost 1920 American silent adventure drama film directed by Maurice Tourneur and written by John Gilbert and Jules Furthman. The film stars Spottiswoode Aitken, Janice Wilson, Harry Northrup, John Gilbert, Wesley Barry, and Jack McDonald. It is based on the short story "The Pavilion on the Links" by Robert Louis Stevenson. The film was released on August 22, 1920, by Paramount Pictures.

== Plot ==
As described in a film magazine, Frank Cassilis, a wanderer, returns once each year to a spot on the bleak Scottish coast to fulfill his word of honor to his archenemy Northmour, a wealthy soldier of fortune in whose hands hang his life. During the visit in 1860 during the night Northmour lands from his yacht in company with Bernard Huddlestone, a London banker fleeing from the danger of the Society of Carbonari, formed of Italians in London. The white circle is the warning mark used by this society. Huddlestone has misused funds entrusted to him by the society and lost them in speculation, so he has bargained away his daughter Clara to Northmour for his protection. Accompanying them on this night, she finds love when she sees Cassilis. Later, following the death of Huddlestone and the burning of Northmour's great home on the Scottish shore by the Italians, the worth of Northmour's reputed character is revealed when he leaves the young woman with Cassilis and spares the latter's life.

== Cast ==
- Spottiswoode Aitken as Bernard Huddlestone
- Janice Wilson as Clara Huddlestone
- Harry Northrup as Northmour (credited as Harry S. Northrup)
- John Gilbert as Frank Cassilis (credited as Jack Gilbert)
- Wesley Barry as Ferd
- Jack McDonald as Gregorio
