= Trouble for Two =

1936 film by J. Walter Ruben

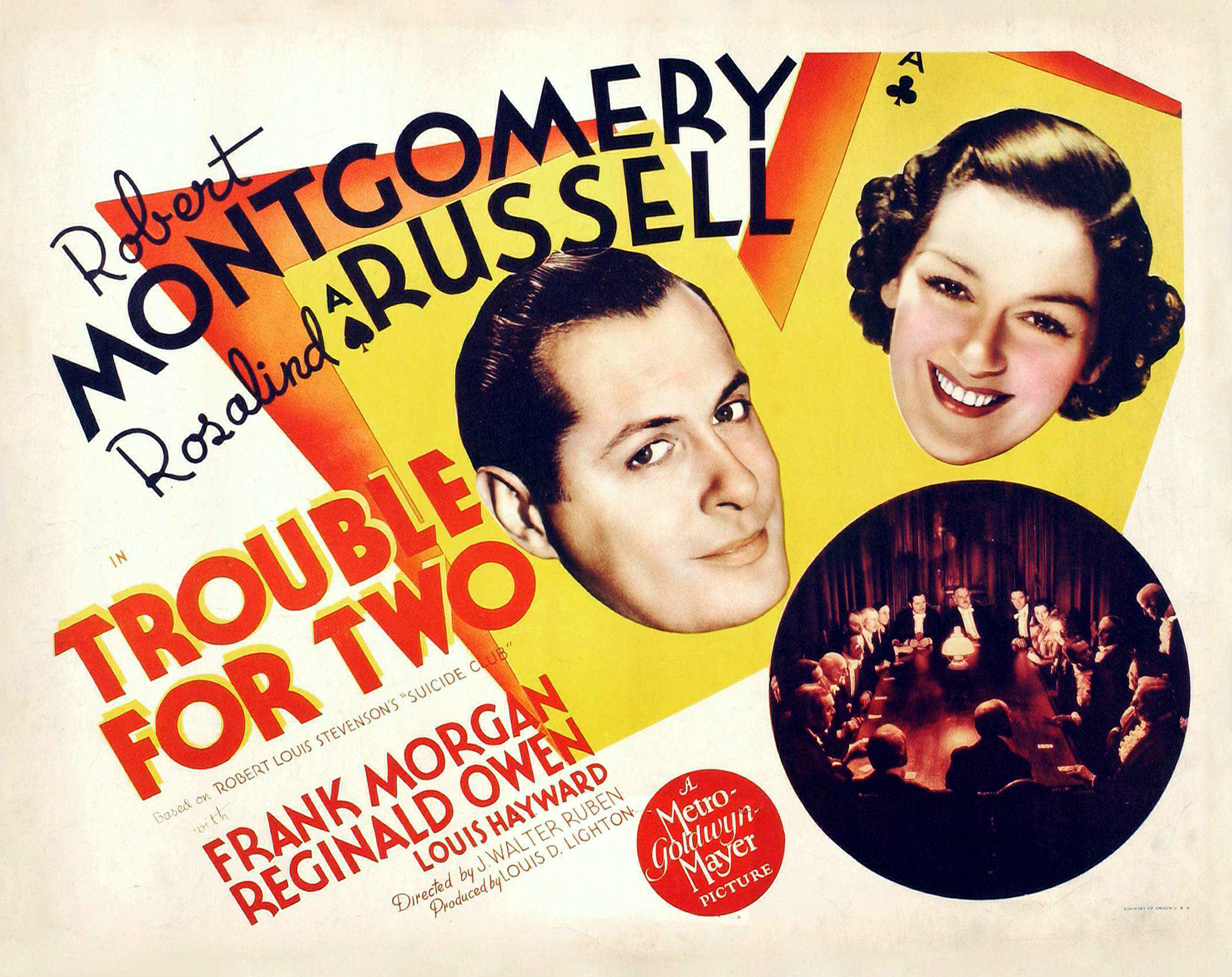
- Film poster
- Directed by: J. Walter Ruben
- Written by: Edward E. Paramore Jr. Manuel Seff
- Based on: short stories in 1895 The Suicide Club by Robert Louis Stevenson
- Produced by: Louis D. Lighton
- Starring: Robert Montgomery; Rosalind Russell
- Cinematography: Charles G. Clarke
- Edited by: Robert J. Kern
- Music by: Franz Waxman
- Production company: Metro-Goldwyn-Mayer
- Release date: May 29, 1936
- Running time: 75 minutes
- Country: United States
- Language: English

Trouble for Two is a 1936 American mystery film directed by J. Walter Ruben and starring Robert Montgomery and Rosalind Russell. It is based on The Suicide Club, a short story collection by Robert Louis Stevenson. A European prince, unhappy over an impending arranged marriage, finds intrigue at an unusual London club.

== Plot ==
Prince Florizel of Corovia is unpleasantly surprised to learn that negotiations for his marriage to Princess Brenda of Irania are far advanced. He has not seen his intended bride since they were children, and at the time, he was not impressed. Luckily for him, Brenda is equally unwilling to marry him, likening it to "buying a pig in a poke". However, his father, the King, reminds him of his duty and their somewhat precarious position; only three years earlier, a revolution was suppressed, and the ringleaders are still at large. The King sends his son to London to think things over, accompanied by Colonel Geraldine.

Traveling incognito, Florizel meets a mysterious woman, Miss Vandeleur, aboard the ship bound for London. She asks him to keep an envelope and return it to her after they arrive. Intrigued, he intervenes when a menacing man enters her cabin to demand the papers, but waits in vain for her at the dock. Geraldine is suspicious and opens the envelope; they find only sheets of blank paper.

In London, they are dining at a restaurant when a young man enters with servants bearing trays of cream tarts and asks a woman patron to eat one. Suspicious, she refuses, so he consumes it himself. When the man asks Florizel, the prince not only accepts, he asks him to dinner to hear his story. The man, Cecil Barnley, confesses to having frivolously squandered his fortune and has embarked on one last silly lark before ending his life at the secret Suicide Club, which arranges deaths in such a manner as to avoid embarrassing its members or their families. Intrigued, Florizel pretends that both he and Geraldine also want to commit suicide and persuades Barnley to take them to the club.

They are scrutinized before being admitted by its president. Inside, Florizel is surprised to find Miss Vandeleur, the sole woman in a roomful of men. The president then deals each person a card: the one who gets the ace of spades is to be killed by the one dealt the ace of clubs. On this night, it is determined that Barnley is to be dispatched by Miss Vandeleur following the instructions of the president. Florizel remains unconvinced that what they saw was real.

The next morning, however, the newspaper reports Barnley's death. Disbelieving that the girl is a murderer, Florizel returns that night. This time, Miss Vandeleur is chosen to do away with Florizel. She takes him to the zoo to be torn apart by a lion. However, she is unable to go through with it. She confesses that she convinced Barnley to continue living and gave him some money to go to Paris. Just then someone shoots at the prince and they flee to an inn. Miss Vandeleur tells him that only the president knew where they were going.

She reveals she is Princess Brenda and that she had recognized him aboard the ship. The next day, Florizel and Geraldine are captured by a ruse arranged by the club president, who is actually Dr. Franz Noel, a Corovian exiled for treason. Noel had created the Suicide Club as a means of income, only to be surprised by Florizel's arrival. Noel sentences Florizel to hang for treason. Florizel escapes, but Geraldine does not. Noel offers to spare his prisoner's life if Florizel will come alone to a duel to the death. Florizel accepts, but recruits some military officers with a spirit for adventure to follow him using a bloodhound. As suspected, Noel has no intention of dueling, but Florizel's men capture Noel's cabal. The prince offers Noel an actual duel, using swords. If Noel wins, his people will be released; however, Florizel emerges the victor. Shortly after, the prince and princess are "introduced" to each other at the court of Corovia.

== Cast ==
- Robert Montgomery as Prince Florizel
- Rosalind Russell as Miss Vandeleur
- Frank Morgan as Colonel Geraldine
- Reginald Owen as President of the Club
- Louis Hayward as "Clive Barnley", the Young Man with the Cream Tarts
- E. E. Clive as King
- Walter Kingsford as Malthus
- Ivan F. Simpson as Collins (as Ivan Simpson)
- Tom Moore as Major O'Rook
- Robert Greig as Fat Man
- Pedro de Cordoba as Sergei
- Leyland Hodgson as Captain Rich (as Leland Hogdson)

== Reception ==
The TV Guide review stated "The film begins as great fun but is ultimately routine and a by-the-book mystery. Despite some good performances by the cast, Trouble for Two is a film of promise that, disappointingly, never quite delivers."

Hans J. Wollstein said this about the film: "The result is a mix of swashbuckling adventure and crime thriller that is neither fish nor fowl."
