= The Suicide Club (short story collection) =

1878 short story collection by Robert Louis Stevenson

- Cover of the 2000 Dover Thrift Edition
- Author: Robert Louis Stevenson
- Cover artist: Teresa Delgado
- Language: English
- Series: Later-day Arabian Nights
- Genre: Detective fiction short story
- Publisher: London Magazine
- Publication date: June–October 1878
- Publication place: Scotland
- Media type: Print (Periodical)
- Followed by: The Rajah's Diamond

The Suicide Club is an 1878 collection of three 19th-century detective fiction short stories by Robert Louis Stevenson that combine to form a single narrative. First published in the London Magazine in 1878, they were collected and republished in the first volume of the New Arabian Nights.

The trilogy introduces the characters of Prince Florizel of Bohemia and his sidekick Colonel Geraldine. In this cycle, the duo infiltrates a secret society of people intent on losing their lives.

It has been described as: "The Prince's investigation of the macabre club and its criminally inclined president makes for one of Stevenson's most exciting and suspenseful tales."

The cycle has been adapted for stage, film and television on a number of occasions.

== Plot summary ==
The three short stories that form this cycle are as follows.

=== Story of the Young Man with the Cream Tarts ===
The story is set in Victorian London, where Prince Florizel of Bohemia and Colonel Geraldine roam in search of adventure. They dine incognito in a London oyster bar where they are surprised to be accosted by a young man distributing cream tarts for free. Intrigued by this idiosyncratic behaviour they invite him to dinner where he reveals the existence of the Suicide Club, for men who want to end their lives, but are not capable of doing that, or do not want to shock their relatives by their suicide. Florizel and Geraldine claim to want to end their lives too, and become members. It turns out that during each gathering of the club two members, excluding the president, are selected at random: one who will be killed, and one to do the killing; the president then instructs the person to be killed where to go, and the killer how to do the killing in such a way that it looks like an accident. Florizel and Geraldine are appalled by the first killing since their membership, and even more by the fact that the second time Florizel is selected to be killed. Geraldine saves him and arranges that servants of Florizel capture the club members. Florizel decides to help the club members to become happy, but also to dispatch the president abroad in the custody of Geraldine's younger brother, to be killed by the latter.

=== Story of the Physician and the Saratoga Trunk ===
The second story in the cycle is set in the Latin Quarter of Paris where an American tourist finds himself embroiled in a dastardly plot.

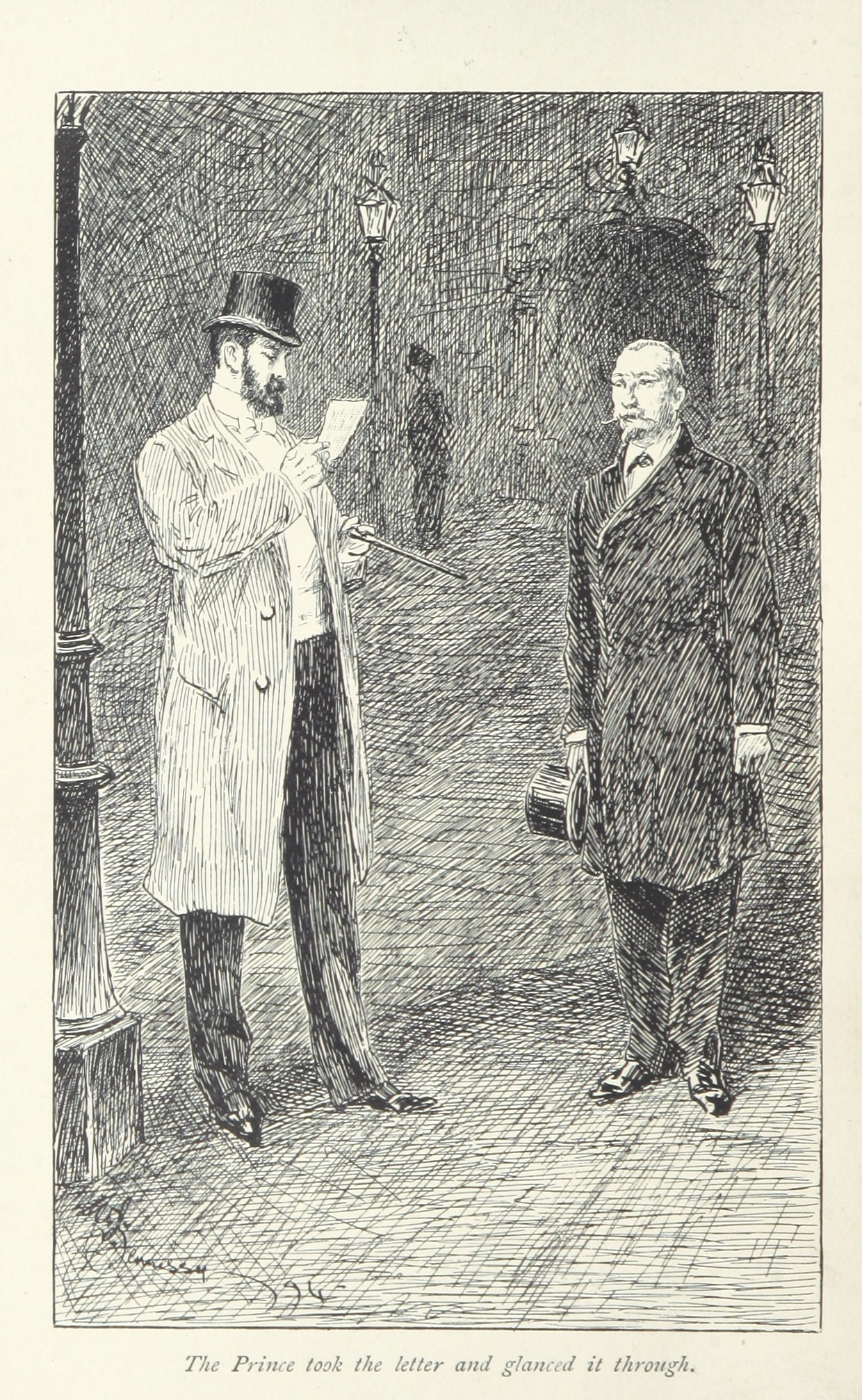
Image taken from page 296 of The Suicide Club and The Rajah's Diamond.

In the story, while lodging in Paris naïve young Silas Q. Scuddamore is lured away by a beautiful young lady who promises a secret assignation but fails to appear. Returning to his hotel dejected he is shocked to discover a dead man in his bed. Kindly neighbour Dr. Noel arranges for Scuddamore and the body (concealed in a Saratoga trunk) to be smuggled to London in the company of Prince Florizel. Once in London, Florizel discovers the plot and reveals the victim to be Geraldine's younger brother who has been murdered by the President of the Suicide Club in his escape from custody.

=== The Adventure of the Hansom Cab ===
The third and final story in the cycle is set in the gas-lit streets of Victorian-era London where a retired British soldier looks for adventure.

In the story, former Lieutenant Brackenbury Rich is beckoned into the back of an elegantly appointed Hansom by a mysterious cabman who whisks him off to a party. There the host continuously assesses his various guests and asks them to depart until only a handful are left. The host then reveals himself to be Colonel Geraldine and invites Rich to join him on a secret mission. They travel to a discreet location where Prince Florizel, with the assistance of Dr. Noel, has finally ensnared the President of the Suicide Club. The Prince challenges the President to a duel to the death and emerges victorious.

== Adaptations ==
1909: American Mutoscope and Biograph Company acquired the film rights in 1908 and director D. W. Griffith used the concept of the suicide club as the basis of his four-minute short The Suicide Club but the plot bore little resemblance to Stevenson’s stories.

1913: A 40-minute German version Der Geheimnisvolle Klub was released.

1914: A British version The Suicide Club (1914) was released, starring Montagu Love as Prince Florizel.

1919: Richard Oswald directed another German movie version as the fourth segment of Unheimliche Geschichten (1919) starring Anita Berber and Conrad Veidt as Club President.

1929: Canadian playwright and theatrical manager Hugh Abercrombie Anderson successfully adapted the work for the stage, receiving good reviews.

1932: Oswald remade his film of 1919 while retaining the title Unheimliche Geschichten but with a new cast led by Paul Wegener. Footage from this film was later edited into Dr. Terror's House of Horrors (1943).

1936: Metro-Goldwyn-Mayer adapted the story for Trouble for Two starring Robert Montgomery as Prince Florizel, Frank Morgan as Colonel Geraldine, Reginald Owen as President of the Club and with the addition of a female love interest played by Rosalind Russell.

1946: A Chilean movie titled La Dama de la muerte directed by Carlos Hugo Christensen and starring Guillermo Battaglia and Carlos Cores. Footage from this film was later edited into Curse of the Stone Hand (1964).

1947: Radio program Murder at Midnight on January 6, 1947. Adaptation entitled "The Ace of Death".

1947: CBS radio Escape on November 12, 1947. Adapted only "The Young Man with the Cream Tarts" portion.

1950: CBS Television series Suspense season 2, episode 24, on 14 February 1950;

1956: ABC Radio ABC Mystery Time on June 7, 1956. "The Suicide Club". Adapted only "The Young Man with the Cream Tarts" portion.

1956: NBC TV series Lilli Palmer Theatre episode 12, directed by Dennis Vance on 12 December 1956;

1960: NBC TV series The Chevy Mystery Show episode 17, starring Cesar Romero and Everett Sloane on 18 September 1960;

1963: Ziv Television Programs TV series Ripcord episode 72, "The Suicide Club", starring Larry Pennell and Ken Curtis;

1970: Thames Television series Mystery and Imagination season 5, episode 1, starring Bernard Archard as President of the Club on 9 February 1970.

1970: A Mexican adaptation entitled El Club de los suicidas starring Enrique Guzmán.

1973: ABC Wide World of Mystery, Suicide Club broadcast February 13, 1973, adapted by Philip H. Reisman Jr., and starring Peter Haskell, Margot Kidder, and Joseph Wiseman.

1974: CBS Radio Mystery Theatre "The Suicide Club". Episode #87, broadcast May 7, starring Barry Nelson, Marian Seldes, John Baragrey, Dan Ocko, Lloyd Batista. Adapted by George Lowthar.

1981: A Soviet adaptation entitled The Suicide Club, or the Adventures of a Titled Person starring Oleg Dal as Prince Florizel and Donatas Banionis as Chairman of the Club.

1988: An independent film version: The Suicide Club starring Mariel Hemingway updated the story to modern times.

2000: The Suicide Club starring Jonathan Pryce chose a more traditional setting but abandoned much of the original story.

2003: A Czech TV movie entitled Bankrotáři was broadcast by Czech Television on 26 December 2003.<

2007: Roberto Santiago directed a Spanish adaptation entitled El Club de los suicidas starring Fernando Tejero and Lucía Jiménez.

2011: Playwright Jeffrey Hatcher adapted elements of the stories but changed the heroes to Sherlock Holmes and Dr. Watson in Sherlock Holmes and the Adventure of the Suicide Club.

2017: Steven Philip Jones and John Ross adapted elements of the stories for their sequel to Bram Stoker's Dracula, Dracula: The Suicide Club published by Caliber Comics.

== Publication history ==
- 1878, UK, London Magazine, Pub date Jun-Oct 1878, Periodical
- 1882, UK, Chatto & Windus, Pub date 1882, Hardback
- 1924 UK, Heinemann, vol one of collected works of Stevenson, Tusitala edition. Hardback.
- 1928, Macmillan Pocket Classics edition, illustrated by H.R..Millar, calf leather hardback.
- 1948 UK, Pan Books Ltd The Suicide Club And Other Adventures Of Prince Florizel (includes the Rajah's Diamond stories) Paperback Printed by L DANEL Lille, France
- 1985, UK, Puffin ISBN 0-14-036764-0, Pub date Aug 1997, Paperback
- 1991, USA, Carroll & Graf ISBN 0-88184-741-0, Pub date Sep 1991, Hardback
- 2000, USA, Dover Publications, Inc. ISBN 0-486-41416-7, Pub date 2000, Paperback
