= A Lodging for the Night =

- Directed by: D. W. Griffith
- Produced by: Biograph Company
- Starring: Mary Pickford; Charles West
- Cinematography: G. W. Bitzer
- Distributed by: General Film Company
- Release date: May 9, 1912
- Running time: short
- Country: United States
- Languages: Silent; English

A Lodging for the Night is a 1912 American silent drama short film directed by D. W. Griffith and stars Mary Pickford and Charles West. The film is also referred to as Lodging for the Night. The plot was perhaps very vaguely inspired by Robert Louis Stevenson's story of the same name and is set in the Old South.

== Plot ==
According to a film magazine, "Dick Logan, a young writer in search of local color, stops at a little border town in the Southwest and engages lodging at the Mexican Inn. Two tramps see the amount of money he has and plan to secure it. In the town he befriends a Mexican girl by stopping her uncle from beating her for having broken a water jar. That night, to while the time, he plays faro and breaks the bank, which greatly augments his already large amount of money. Retiring to his room, he is awakened by the efforts of the two tramps to get into the room. He steals out and asks for lodging for the night at a nearby house, which happens to be the home of the Mexican girl and her uncle. Here be gets real "local color," as the tramps have followed him and they enter the room through the window, while the Mexican, who also covets his money, enters through the door. The girl, however, saves him from harm, and it looks as if Dick had found a real heroine for a real romance."

== Cast ==
- Charles West as Dick Logan
- Mary Pickford as The Mexican Girl
- Charles Hill Mailes as The Mexican Girl's Father
- Frank Opperman as The Owner of the Gambling Hall
- Frank Evans as The Gambler
- W. C. Robinson as The Bartender/A Deputy
- Robert Harron as The Victim/in Gambling Hall
- Mae Marsh as First Mexican Couple - The Woman
- Christy Cabanne as The First Mexican Couple - The Man
- Alfred Paget as The Sheriff
- Hector Dion as The Porter

=== Uncredited ===
- John Barrymore at card table/conspirator/thug
- Lionel Barrymore at Desperado at card table
- Sidney Drew at card table (unconfirmed!)
