= The Pavilion on the Links =

1880 short story by Robert Louis Stevenson

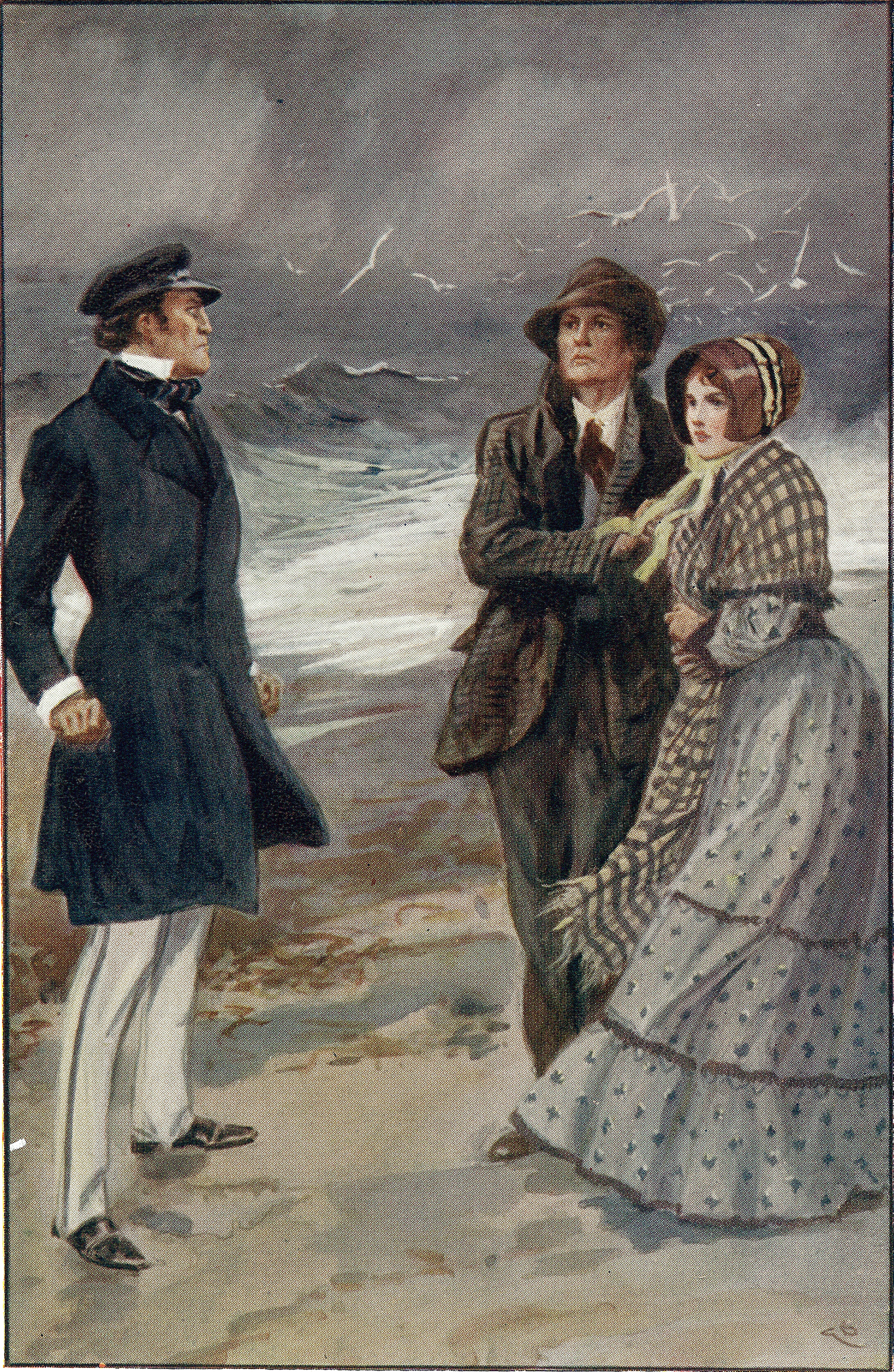
1913 edition illustrated by Gordon Browne.

"The Pavilion on the Links" is an 1880 short story by Robert Louis Stevenson. It was first published in Cornhill Magazine (Vol. 42, Sept-Oct 1880). A revised version was included in New Arabian Nights (1882).

The story was considered by Sir Arthur Conan Doyle in 1890 as "the high-water mark of [Stevenson’s] genius" and "the first short story in the world". Along with a number of other stories it was collected in a volume entitled New Arabian Nights in 1882. This collection is seen as the starting point for the history of the short story in England by Barry Menikoff.

== Adaptations ==
The White Circle, a silent film, was released in 1920, starring Spottiswoode Aitken as Bernard Huddlestone, Janice Wilson as Clara Huddlestone, Harry Northrup as Northmour, and John Gilbert as Frank Cassilis.

State of Siege, episode 16 of season 4 of the TV series Maverick, borrows the actual siege and the host engaged to the daughter of the wanted man, but little else of the story, which it re-situates in the New Mexico Territory as a dispute between Spanish landowners.

The Pavilion, a direct-to-video release, came out in 1999, starring Craig Sheffer as Frank Cassilis, Patsy Kensit as Clara Huddlestone, Richard Chamberlain as Huddlestone, and Daniel Riordan as Northmour.
