= The Forged Note =

1915 novel by Oscar Micheaux

The Forged Note: A Romance Of The Darker Races is a 528-page novel by African-American writer and filmmaker Oscar Micheaux, published in 1915. It was republished in 2008 by Kessinger Publishing, LLC. The story pertains to a racially motivated lynching in Atlanta.
