= The Research Magnificent =

1915 novel by H.G. Wells

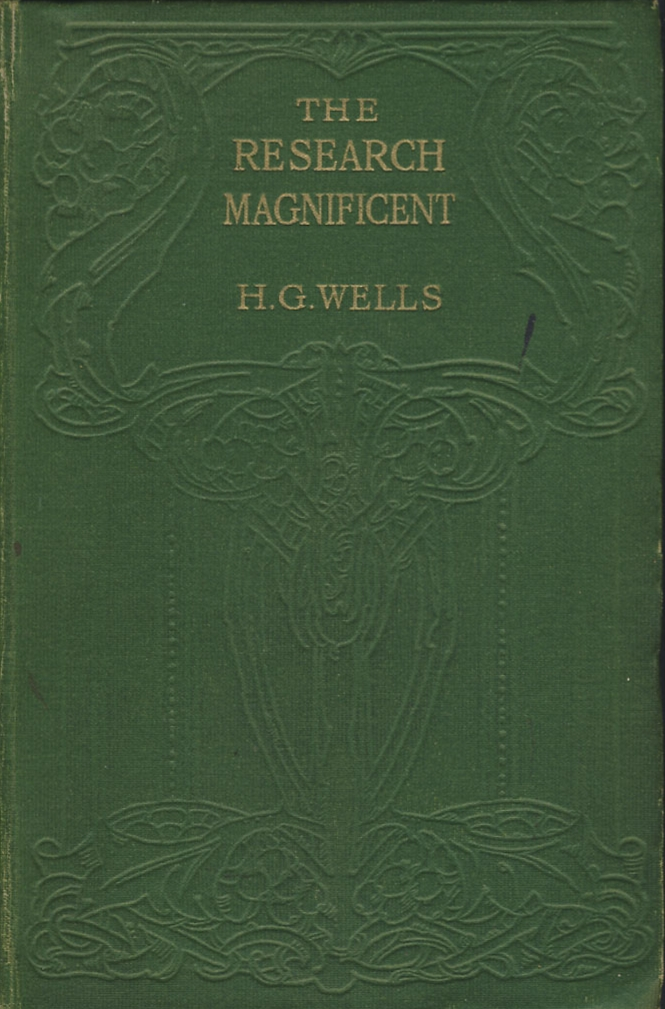
- First edition
- Author: H. G. Wells
- Language: English
- Genre: Novel
- Publisher: Macmillan
- Publication date: 1915
- Publication place: United Kingdom
- Pages: 341

The Research Magnificent is a 1915 novel by H. G. Wells.

== Plot summary ==
The text of this novel of ideas presents itself as a book that has been written as the result of a promise to a dying man. William Porphyry Benham is a man who has lived a life devoted to a complicated, protean idea: "that he had to live life nobly and thoroughly." He has left behind him "half a score of patent files quite distended [with papers] and a writing-table drawer-full," and the novel is by implication what his friend White, who has promised to "see after your book," has produced to acquit himself of the promise, since the papers themselves are "an indigestible aggregation."

Benham is a man of means due to curious circumstances: his mother left his father, a schoolmaster, for a wealthy man named Nolan who died soon thereafter, but not before leaving "about a third of his very large fortune entirely to Mrs. Benham and the rest to her in trust for her son, whom he deemed himself to have injured." His mother subsequently marries a great London surgeon and becomes Lady Marayne; her indiscretion is forgiven and she enjoys a position of privilege.

The bulk of the novel recounts Benham's effort to live nobly, which brings him into conflict with his mother, with his friend Prothero, a schoolboy chum who becomes a Cambridge don, and with his wife, Amanda, a young woman he loves passionately but then leaves behind in England to travel the world (India, Russia, China) in search of wisdom. It is in Johannesburg, South Africa, that Benham is fatally shot while attempting to stop soldiers firing at strikers.

== Themes ==
The body of the novel is preceded by a 55-page "prelude" entitled "On Fear and Aristocracy" that explains Benham's lifelong perplexity at the failure of human beings to be noble, and his early belief that the conquest of fear is the essence of the noble life. The six chapters of the novel, which tell Benham's life story, explore this perplexity. Benham dies in the midst of his quest, but his papers show that he has arrived at the tentative conclusion that there are four impediments, or "limitations" as he labels them, that keep human beings from living nobly: (1) fear; (2) self-indulgences, including sex; (3) jealousy; and (4) prejudice (by the last he means "the most remarkable array of influences, race-hatred, national suspicion, the evil side of patriotism, religious and social intolerance, every social consequence of muddle headedness, every dividing force indeed except the purely personal dissensions between man and man.")

According to biographer David C. Smith, in The Research Magnificent Wells is "directly treating the early days of his life with Rebecca West, during which her possessive drive sometimes repelled him, but his sexual need brought him back"; features of his relationship with West include "the pet names, the violent and passionate early encounters, and the words, gestures, and 'business' which Wells needed so badly in his romantic life . . . and not in a comic way as was so often his method for dealing with such matters." It was during the writing of this book that Wells's son by Rebecca West, Anthony West, was born.
