= The Old Man (Gorky play) =

Play by Maxim Gorlk

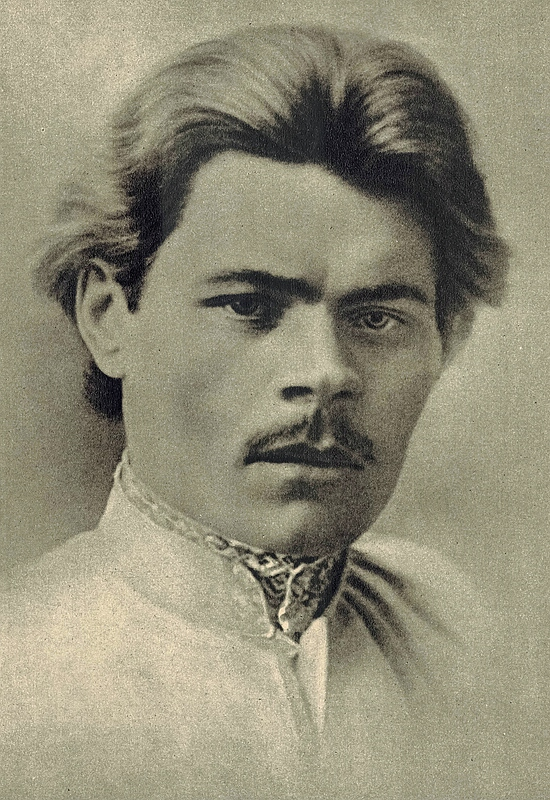
Maxim Gorky in 1889

The Old Man (Старик) is a 1915 by Maxim Gorky. Revised 1922, 1924, it has also been translated by Marie Zakrevsky and Barrett H. Clark The Judge (1925).
