= Justus Miles Forman =

American dramatist

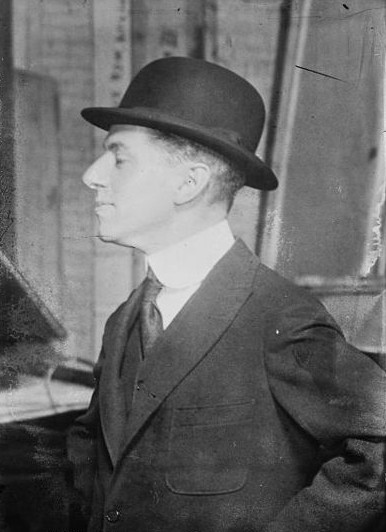
- Justus Miles Forman
- Born: November 1, 1875; Le Roy, New York
- Died: May 7, 1915 (aged 39); RMS Lusitania, Atlantic Ocean

Justus Miles Forman (November 1, 1875 – May 7, 1915) was an American novelist and playwright.

== Biography ==
Forman was born on November 1, 1875, in Le Roy, New York. He attended Yale University.

His only play, The Hyphen, appeared in 1915 but did not receive the success Forman expected. The Hyphen was a topical drama about "German-Americans" and "Irish-Americans" whose patriotism and fidelity to the United States is questioned due to events in Europe during World War I. Forman hoped that the drama would do better business in a production in London and decided to book a first-class passage aboard the RMS Lusitania. Days before he was to board the liner, however, he received a mysterious phone call from a man with a thick German accent who warned him not to board the Lusitania. Forman ignored the phone call and embarked on the Lusitania on May 1, 1915. The Lusitania was torpedoed on May 7, 1915, and Forman was among the 1,198 passengers who perished in the sinking. His body was never recovered.

== Works ==
- Garden of Lies A Romance (1902 Illustrated) Copyright Fredrick A Stokes - Grosset & Dunlap Publishers New York
- Jason (1909)
- Bianca's Daughter (1910)
- The Opening Door
- The Unknown Lady
- Journey's End
- Island of Enchantment
- Monsigny: The Soul Of Gold
- Tommy Carteret
- Buchanan’s Wife
- A Modern Ulysses.
- The Quest.
- The Court Of The Angels.
- The Harvest Moon.
- The Six Rubies.
