= Emilio D'Amore =

Italian politician (1915–2017)

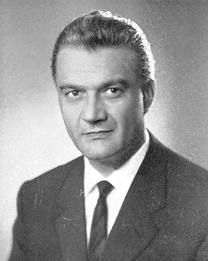

Member of the Chamber of Deputies
- In office 16 May 1963 – 4 June 1968
- In office 8 May 1948 – 11 June 1958

Personal details
- Born: 26 November 1915 Montefalcione
- Died: 21 October 2017 (aged 101) Avellino
- Party: Italian Democratic Party of Monarchist Unity (after 1953)
- Other political affiliations: Monarchist National Party (until 1953)

Emilio D'Amore (26 November 1915 – 21 October 2017) was an Italian writer, journalist, and politician.

A native of Montefalcione, D'Amore was born on 26 November 1915. He was first elected to the Chamber of Deputies in 1948 as a representative of the Monarchist National Party. D'Amore joined the Italian Democratic Party of Monarchist Unity (PDIUM) and won reelection in 1953. He served a final term in the Chamber of Deputies from 1963 to 1968, again as a member of the PDIUM.
