= Július Tomin (Interlingua) =

Július Tomin (12 April 1915 – 7 April 2003) was a Slovak high school teacher and author. He was persecuted during the Soviet occupation for promoting Interlingua as a second language.

== Life ==
He was born during World War I in Nová Baňa. His high school studies concluded in Slovakia, and he continued at the Charles University in Prague at the age of 18. One of Tomin's four sons, also named Julius, participated in the struggle against Communism as part of the renowned opposition group Charter 77. Tomin died on 7 April 2003, after a period of declining health. He was 87.

== Interlingua ==
He became interested in Interlingua soon after the Soviet invasion of Czechoslovakia in August 1968, when Bent Andersen, then administrator of the Union Mundial pro Interlingua, sent him a letter about the language. In Krupina, Tomin taught Interlingua for many years to help his students understand the international words in their own language.

His first article on Interlingua was published in the Slovak magazine Príroda a spoločnosť (Nature and Society) in 1971. Soon after its publication, he began to receive anonymous letters. One read,

"What – who do you serve?! Imperialism, the American millionaires; you are a slave paid by our enemies, by warmongers. Our language Esperanto is the language of peace, of friendship, language of Lenin, of humanism. – If you don't stop spreading Interlingua, you will see!"

He continued his work, writing articles for publication and securing a presentation on Bratislavan radio. One long article, "The language for science and technology," was translated into Croatian and Hungarian. His Interlingua-Slovak dictionary was published in 1979, and his 10-lesson course in 1985. This was later translated into Polish.

At a conference in Prague, Tomin described further persecution in the Soviet-occupied country:

"The Esperantists – one of them made me aware [of this] – were spying, to see if I was selling publications to accuse me to our political organs. Thank God, my hands were clean."

He initiated correspondence between his Interlingua class and that of Ingvar Stenström in Varberg, Sweden. In 1987, the House of Pedagogy published his manual on internationalisms in the Slovak, essentially an introduction to Interlingua. He later explained,

"...I inform the reader about Interlingua without mentioning or criticizing Esperanto. But one of the reviewers, a fanatical Esperantist, wrote in the review, "The chapter about Interlingua must be unconditionally abolished!"

He added, "After a grave struggle, I won out."

He became the Czech Interlingua representative in 1988. After the dissolution of Czechoslovakia in 1993, he reassumed this charge as the Slovak representative, a position he would hold until 2000. In 1994, after the fall of the Iron Curtain, Tomin published a book about Interlingua. It received enthusiastic reviews from the Czech press. He followed this work with a large Slovak-Interlingua dictionary in 1996. He came to advocate Interlingua as a "neutral language" and as a "just, fair solution" to linguistic problems in Europe.

Tomin wrote numerous articles explaining the linguistic foundation and educational purposes of Interlingua, but his articles on the struggle against smoking have brought him more media attention.

== See also ==
- History of Interlingua
