= Nilawan Pintong =

Thai feminist

Khun Nilawan Pintong
- นิลวรรณ ปิ่นทอง
- Born: 6 December 1915; Bangkok, Siam (now Thailand)
- Died: 7 February 2017 (aged 101); Bangkok, Thailand
- Citizenship: Thai
- Education: Bethaburi School of Teacher Training, Chulalongkorn University
- Occupations: Editor, Feminist
- Known for: Public service

Khun Nilawan Pintong (Thai: นิลวรรณ ปิ่นทอง; 6 December 1915 – 7 February 2017) was a Thai feminist whose efforts toward the development of women's rights in Thailand earned her the title Steel Lotus Blossom. She is best known as the founder of the Ounakorn Center and Satree Sarn Magazine, Thailand's first women's magazine which aimed to inspire women to have active participation in community affairs. In 1961, she is also the first Thai recipient of the Ramon Magsaysay Award for Public Service. The award was given for her role in giving "Thai women a new and creative role in nation-building." The award included $10,000, a gold medal and a certificate given to her and the other recipients.

== Early life and education ==
Khun Nilawan was born on 6 December 1915 in Bangkok. She owes her Buddhist education to her father who became a monk after Nilawan's mother died. Having been educated in the spirit of charity and service since young, Nilawan pursued her dream of being a teacher and earned her certificate from the Bethaburi School of Teacher Training in Bangkok. In 1936, she obtained her Bachelor of Arts degree in Modern Languages (English and French) with First Honors in English from Chulalongkorn University.

== Career and legacy ==
Khun Nilawan taught for a year at a secondary school under the Ministry of Education, after which she became chief of the Official Publications Section, and later chief of the Foreign Press Section, both under the Department of Foreign Affairs. It was during this time when, exposed to Western notions of human freedom, she realized the importance of education for the limitless self-fulfillment of an individual, in contrast to the traditional role women played in society; confined within the domestic sphere with no involvement in civic and community affairs.

Despite the lack of funds, Nilawan founded the fortnightly magazine Satree Sarn Magazine in 1947 with the help of three friends. The magazine was targeted at women and its contents ranged from fashion and crafts to art and literature. In just a span of three years, it became Thailand's most widely read magazine until its last publication in 1996 due to financial problems.

Her publishing venture flourished with the founding of Daroon Sarn (Youth's Magazine), a weekly for adolescents and young adults, and Sapdha Sarn, a weekly newsmagazine containing in-depth significant news. Alongside Daroon Sarn, Khun Nilawan launched the Preeya Club for children which organized arts and crafts classes and other children's activities. Aside from these, she also ventured into other projects like a translation services and a weekly radio program, while collaborating with the Thai Library Association to raise the standards of library work in Thailand. She was also the Society of Printing president for a time.

Among her various positions were president and secretary of the PEN Center of Thailand; executive secretary of the Thai Foundation for Journalism Education; member of the National Council on Education, chairperson of the Executive Committee on the National Council of Women of Thailand; member of the Thai Merchants Association; vice president of the Pan Pacific and Southeast Asia Women's Association. To provide a home for various homeless NGOs, she founded and directed the Ounakorn Center which also served as a home to foreign visitors in related fields.

Pintong died on 7 February 2017, aged 101.

== Awards ==
- Ramon Magsaysay Award for Public Service
- Honorary Doctorate of Arts in Chulalongkorn University
