= The New Republic (novel) =

1877 novel by William Hurrell Mallock

- First editions
- Author: William Hurrell Mallock
- Language: English
- Genre: satire
- Publisher: Chatto and Windus
- Publication date: 1877
- Publication place: United Kingdom

The New Republic or Culture, Faith and Philosophy in an English Country House by English author William Hurrell Mallock (1849–1923) is a novel first published by Chatto and Windus of London in 1877. The work had its genesis as a serialization. In June–December 1876 it appeared as a series of sketches in Belgravia magazine.

== Plot introduction ==
The novel is a satire consisting almost entirely of dialogue and mocking most of the important figures then at Oxford University, with regards to aestheticism and Hellenism.

== Characters ==
The famous people Mallock depicts are as follows, together with the names of the characters that represent them.

Matthew Arnold — Mr. Luke
Thomas Carlyle — Donald Gordon
William Kingdon Clifford — Mr. Saunders
Violet Fane — Mrs. Sinclair
William Money Hardinge — Robert Leslie
Thomas Huxley — Mr. Storks
Benjamin Jowett — Dr. Jenkinson
W. H. Mallock — Otho Laurence
Walter Pater — Mr. Rose
Edward Bouverie Pusey — Dr. Seydon
John Ruskin — Mr. Herbert
John Tyndall — Mr. Stockton

== Literary significance and criticism ==
The book became a best seller in its time and retains much of its humour and satirical bite today. As author David Daiches wrote in 1951, "If we can read through The New Republic without at one point or another being made to feel a little foolish, we are wise indeed."

Walter Pater is of particular interest because Mallock's apparent homophobia against him—expressed first in the more extensive treatment given the Mr. Rose character in the initial serialization—helped ruin Pater's public reputation as well as his career at Oxford. Reading Wilde, Querying Spaces: An Exhibition Commemorating the 100th Anniversary of the Trials of Oscar Wilde notes that, as Linda Dowling has observed, "Mr. Rose" is "the first in a long line of popular depictions of effeminate English aesthetes such as Gilbert's Bunthorne and Du Maurier's Postlewaite and Maudle". This depiction of Pater appeared during the competition for the Oxford Professorship of Poetry and played a role in convincing Pater to remove himself from consideration.

== Influence ==
The New Republic inspired a number of novels in which representative gatherings of intellectuals discuss important issues of the day in a country-house setting, including Goldsworthy Lowes Dickinson's A Modern Symposium (1905), John Buchan's A Lodge in the Wilderness (1906) — set in a multi-millionaire's lodge on the East Kenyan Plateau — and Ronald Knox's Sanctions (1924). Evelyn Waugh, in his Life of Ronald Knox writes that "Mallock's New Republic was an essential book to Ronald, perhaps his favourite work of secular literature outside the Classics." H. G. Wells's satirical novel Boon (1915) is explicitly indebted to The New Republic, even featuring the "villa by the sea" that is the setting for Mallock's novel.
