= William Hurrell Mallock =

English novelist and economics writer

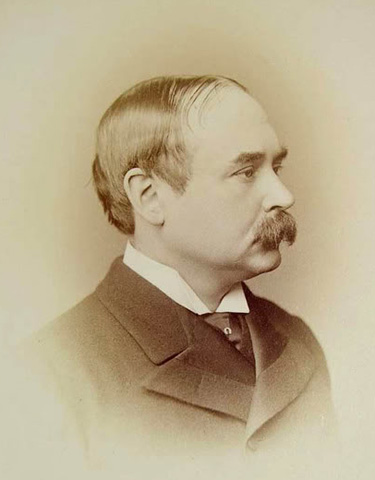
- Cabinet card of Mallock, by Elliott & Fry, circa 1880s.
- Born: 7 February 1849; Cheriton Bishop, Devon, England
- Died: 2 April 1923 (aged 74); Wincanton, Somerset, England
- Education: Balliol College, Oxford
- Occupations: Novelist, sociologist, lecturer and economist
- Parent(s): Rev. William Mallock and Margaret Froude
- Relatives: Arnulph Mallock, William Froude, Richard Hurrell Froude, James Anthony Froude, Mary Margaret Mallock (sister)

Signature
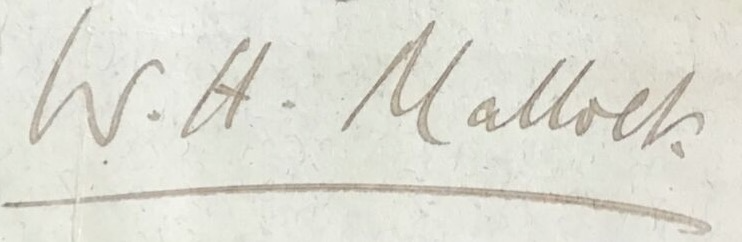

William Hurrell Mallock (7 February 1849 – 2 April 1923) was an English novelist and economics writer. Much of his writing is in support of the Roman Catholic Church and in opposition to positivist philosophy and socialism.

== Biography ==
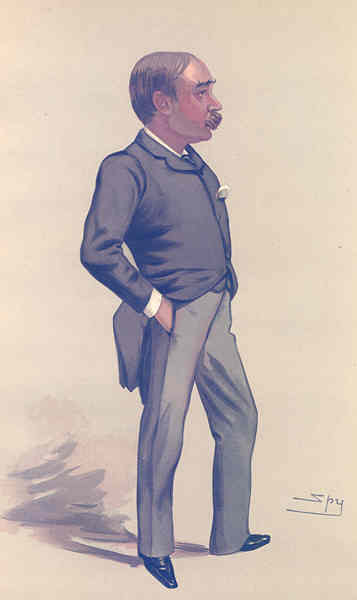
"Is life worth living?" W. H. Mallock as caricatured by Spy in Vanity Fair, 30 December 1882.

A nephew of the historian James Anthony Froude, Mallock was educated privately and then at Balliol College, Oxford. He won the Newdigate Prize in 1872 for his poem The Isthmus of Suez and took a second class in the final classical schools in 1874, receiving his Bachelor of Arts degree from Oxford University. He never entered a profession, though he at one time considered the diplomatic service.

He first drew wide attention with the satirical novel The New Republic (1877), conceived while he was a student at Oxford. Written as a roman à clef, it included characters recognizable as prominent figures such as Benjamin Jowett, Matthew Arnold, Violet Fane, Thomas Carlyle, and Thomas Henry Huxley. Although early critical reception was mixed, the book caused controversy, particularly for its satirical portrayal of the critic Walter Pater. Contemporary and later commentators described the depiction (as “Mr. Rose”) as deliberately cutting and suggestive of aesthetic and sexual affectation.

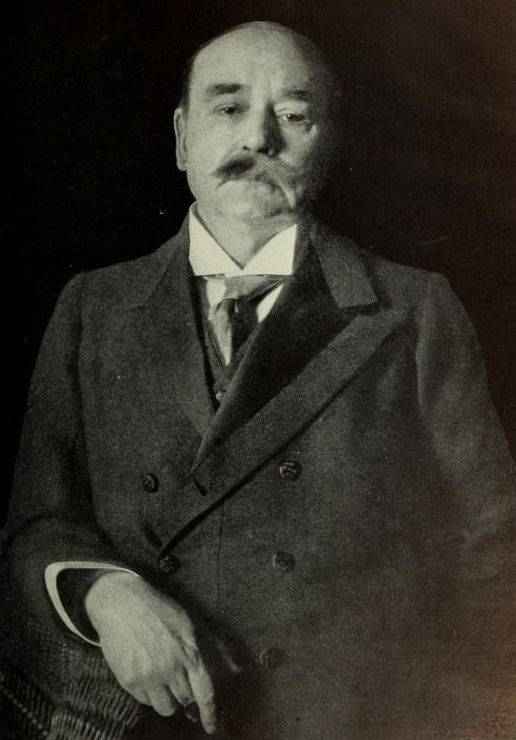
Mallock later in life.

The appearance of The New Republic coincided with discussion of the Oxford Professorship of Poetry and is frequently cited as one factor in Pater’s decision not to stand for the post. Pater later published “A Study of Dionysus: The Spiritual Form of Fire and Dew,” which has sometimes been read as an indirect reply to the atmosphere of the controversy.

In subsequent decades Mallock wrote both fiction and polemical works on religion and politics. In books on religious questions he argued for dogma as the foundation of religion and rejected attempts to base religion solely on scientific claims. In Is Life Worth Living? (1879) and the satirical novel The New Paul and Virginia (1878) he attacked positivist ideas and wrote in defence of the Roman Catholic Church. (One of his uncles, Hurrell Froude, had been a founder of the Oxford Movement.)

He also contributed frequently to newspapers and magazines, including The Forum, National Review, Public Opinion, Contemporary Review, and Harper’s Weekly. His April 1889 essay opposing Thomas Huxley’s agnosticism appeared in The Fortnightly Review and was reprinted in Popular Science Monthly. The piece formed part of a broader public dispute involving Huxley and William Connor Magee, Bishop of Peterborough.

From the 1880s onward he published a series of works on economics and social policy critical of radical and socialist theories, including Social Equality (1882), Property and Progress (1884), Labour and the Popular Welfare (1893), Classes and Masses (1896), Aristocracy and Evolution (1898), and A Critical Examination of Socialism (1908). In 1907 he visited the United States to deliver a set of lectures on socialism under the auspices of the National Civic Federation and at universities in several cities, including New York, Cambridge, Chicago, Philadelphia, and Baltimore.

Among his anti-socialist works is also the novel The Old Order Changes (1886). His other novels include A Romance of the Nineteenth Century (1881), A Human Document (1892), The Heart of Life (1895), Tristram Lacy (1899), The Veil of the Temple (1904), and An Immortal Soul (1908).

Mallock later received renewed attention from some conservative writers. Russell Kirk discussed him at length in The Conservative Mind, citing earlier critics such as George Saintsbury and John Squire on Mallock’s argumentative skill and style, while emphasizing his sustained opposition to political and moral radicalism.

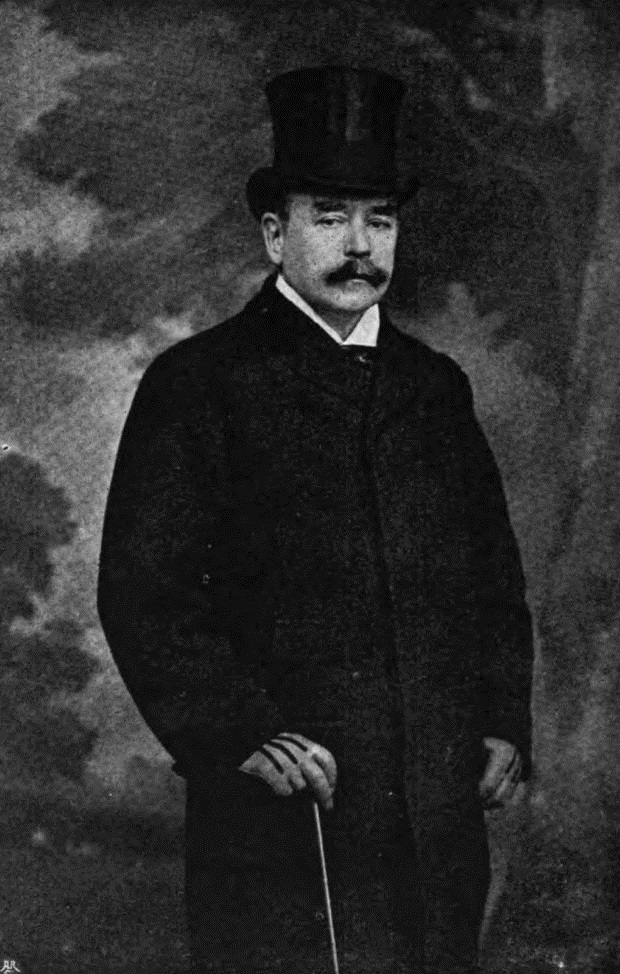
Mallock, by Elliott & Fry.

He published a volume of Poems in 1880. His 1878 book Lucretius included verse translations from the Roman poet, followed by Lucretius on Life and Death (1900), a sequence of verse paraphrases influenced by the style of Edward FitzGerald’s Rubaiyat of Omar Khayyam; a second edition appeared in 1910.

== Influence and legacy ==
Ironically, this last work on Lucretius came to be highly regarded by freethinkers and other religious skeptics. Corliss Lamont includes portions of the third canto in his A Humanist Funeral Service. Mallock himself, in his introduction, seems to be offering it, somewhat condescendingly, for the use of such non-Christians when he writes:

Those, however, who... are adherents of the principles which [Lucretius] shares with the latest scientists of to-day, can hardly find the only hope which is open to them expressed by any writer with a loftier and more poignant dignity than that with which they will find it expressed by the Roman disciple of Epicurus.

The popular English novelist Ouida (Maria Louise Ramé) dedicated her book of essays Views and Opinions (1895) to Mallock—"To W. H. Mallock. As a slight token of personal regard and intellectual admiration."

Artist Tom Phillips used Mallock's A Human Document as the basis for his project A Humument, in which he took a copy of the novel and constructed a work of art using its pages.

== Works ==
- Every Man his Own Poet. Oxford: T. Shrimpton & Son, 1872.
- The New Republic; or, Culture, Faith, and Philosophy in an English Country House, Vol. 2. London: Chatto and Windus, 1877 (Rep. Leicester University Press, 1975).
- The New Paul and Virginia, or Positivism on an Island. London: Chatto & Windus, 1878.
- Is Life Worth Living? London: Chatto & Windus, 1879.
- Poems. London: Chatto & Windus, 1880.
- A Romance of the Nineteenth Century, 2 Vol. London: Chatto & Windus, 1881.
- Social Equality, a Short Study in a Missing Science. London: Richard Bentley & Son, 1882.
- Atheism and the Value of Life. London: Richard Bentley and Son, 1884.
- Property and Progress, or, A brief Enquiry into Contemporary Social Agitation in England. London: John Murray, 1884.
- The Old Order Changes, Vol. 2, Vol. 3. London: John Murray, 1886.
- Lucretius. London: William Blackwood & Sons, 1887.
- In an Enchanted Island: or, A Winter's Retreat in Cyprus. London: Richard Bentley & Son, 1889.
- A Human Document – A Novel, Vol. 2, Vol. 3. London: Chapman & Hall, 1892.
- Verses. London: Hutchinson & Co., 1893.
- Labour and the Popular Welfare. London: Adam & Charles Black, 1893.
- The Heart of Life, Vol. 2, Vol. 3. London: Chapman & Hall, 1895.
- Studies of Contemporary Superstition. London: Ward & Downey Limited, 1895.
- Classes and Masses, or, Wealth, Wages, and Welfare in the United Kingdom. London: Adam & Charles Black, 1896.
- Socialism and Social Discord. London: Published at the Central Offices of the Liberty and Property Defense League, 1896.
- Aristocracy and Evolution: A Study of the Rights, the Origin, and the Social Functions of the Wealthier Classes. London: Adam & Charles Black, 1898.
- Tristram Lacy, or the Individualist. London: Chapman & Hall, 1899.
- Lucretius on Life and Death. London: Adam & Charles Black, 1900.
- Doctrine and Doctrinal Disruption. London: Adam & Charles Blackie, 1900.
- Religion as Credible Doctrine: A Study of the Fundamental Difficulty. New York: The Macmillan Company, 1903.
- The Fiscal Dispute Made Easy; or, A Key to the Principles Involved in the Opposite Policies. London: Eveleigh Nash, 1903.
- The Veil of the Temple; or, From Dark to Twilight. London: John Murray, 1904.
- The Reconstruction of Belief. London: Chapman & Hall (Rep. as The Reconstruction of Religious Belief. New York: Harper & Brothers, 1905).
- Socialism. New York: The National Civic Federation, 1907.
- A Critical Examination Of Socialism. London: John Murray, 1908.
- Short Epitome of Eight Lectures on Some of the Principal Fallacies of Socialism. J. Truscott, 1908.
- An Immortal Soul. London: George Bells & Sons, 1908.
- The Nation as a Business Firm, an Attempt to Cut a Path Through Jungle. London: Adam & Charles Black, 1910.
- Social Reform as Related to Realities and Delusions; an Examination of the Increase and Distribution of Wealth from 1801 to 1910. London: John Murray, 1914.
- The Limits of Pure Democracy. London: Chapman & Hall. London, 1918 (1st Pub. 1917).
  - Democracy; being an Abridged Edition of 'The Limits of Pure Democracy', with an introduction by the Duke of Northumberland. London: Chapman & Hall, ltd., 1924.
- Capital, War & Wages, Three Questions in Outline. London: Blackie & Son Limited, 1918.
- Memoirs of Life and Literature. New York: Harper & Brothers Publishers, 1920.

As editor

- Letters, Remains, and Memoirs of Edward Adolphus Seymour, Twelfth Duke of Somerset, with Helen Guendolen Seymour Ramsden. London: Richard Bentley & Son, 1893.

== Articles ==
- "Prophets and Poets," Dark Blue, Vol. XIV, April 1871.
- "The Golden Ass of Apuleius," Fraser's Magazine, New Series, Vol. XIV, July/December, 1876.
- "Seneca's Œdipus," The Gentleman's Magazine, Vol. CCXL, January/June, 1877.
- "Modern Atheism – Its Attitude Towards Morality," The Contemporary Review, Vol. XXIX, January, 1877.
- "Is Life Worth Living?," The Nineteenth Century, Vol. II, August/December, 1877; Part II (conclusion), Vol. III, January/June, 1878.
- "The Future of Faith," The Contemporary Review, Vol. XXXI, March 1878.
- "Positivism on an Island," The Contemporary Review, Vol. XXXII, April 1878.
- "A Familiar Colloquy on Recent Art," The Nineteenth Century, Vol. IV, July/December, 1878.
- "Faith and Verification," The Nineteenth Century, Vol. IV, July/December, 1878.
- "Dogma and Morality," The Nineteenth Century, Vol. IV, July/December, 1878.
- "The Logic of Toleration," The Nineteenth Century, Vol. V, January/June, 1879.
- "Intolerance and Persecution," Appleton's Journal, Vol. VI, No. 32, February 1879.
- "A Dialogue on Human Happiness," The Nineteenth Century, Vol. VI, July/December, 1879.
- "Impressions of Theophrastus Such, by George Elliott," The Edinburgh Review, Vol. CL, October 1879.
- "Atheistic Methodism," The Nineteenth Century, Vol. VII, January/June, 1880.
- "Atheism and the Rights of Man," The Nineteenth Century, Vol. VII, January/June, 1880.
- "Atheism and Repentance – A Familiar Colloquy," The Nineteenth Century, Vol. VIII, July/December, 1880.
- "The Philosophy of Conservatism," The Nineteenth Century, Vol. VIII, July/December, 1880.
- "Civilization and Equality – A Familiar Colloquy," The Contemporary Review, Vol. XL, October, 1881.
- "A Missing Science," The Contemporary Review, Vol. XL, December, 1881.
- "Radicalism – A Familiar Colloquy," The Nineteenth Century, Vol. IX, January/June, 1881.
- "The Functions of Wealth," The Contemporary Review, Vol. XLI, February, 1882.
- "The Radicalism of the Marketplace," National Review, Vol. I, June 1883.
- "English Radicalism and the People," National Review, Vol. I, 1883.
- "Radicalism and the Working Classes," National Review, Vol. II, September 1883.
- "Conservatism and Socialism," The National Review, Vol. II, 1883.
- "Landlords and the National Income," The National Review, Vol. II, 1883.
- "Conversations With a Solitary," The North American Review, Vol. CXXXIV, No. 306, May, 1882; Part II, Vol. CXXXVII, No. 322, September, 1883; Part III, Vol. CXXXVII, No. 324, November, 1883.
- "How to Popularize Unpopular Political Truths," National Review, Vol. VI, 1885.
- "The Old Order Changes," National Review, Vol. VI, 1885.
- "The Convalescence of Faith," The Forum, Vol. II, 1886.
- "Faith and Physical Science," The Forum, Vol. II, 1886.
- "Notes on Mr. Hyndman's 'Reply'," Fortnightly Review, Vol. XLI, 1887.
- "Wealth and the Working Classes," Fortnightly Review, Vol. XLI, 1887.
- "What is the Object of Life?," The Forum, Vol. III, August 1887.
- "Values and Prices," The Library Magazine, Vol. III, April/June, 1887.
- "Qualities of the Bourgeoisie," Fortnightly Review, 1887.
- "Scientific Prospects of Labor," Fortnightly Review, 1887.
- "Conservatism and the Diffusion of Property," National Review, Vol. XI, 1888.
- "Poverty, Sympathy and Economics," The Forum, Vol. V, 1888.
- "Scenes in Cyprus," Scribner's Magazine, September 1888.
- "Radicals and the Unearned Increment," National Review, Vol. XIII, 1889.
- "Science and the Revolution," Fortnightly Review, Vol. LII, 1889.
- "The Scientific Basis of Optimism," Fortnightly Review, Vol. XLV, 1889.
- "Cowardly Agnosticism, a Word with Prof. Huxley," Fortnightly Review, April 1889.
- "The Conditions of Great Poetry," Quarterly Review, Vol. 192, 1900.
- "Mr. Labouchere: The Democrat," Fortnightly Review, Vol. LIII, 1890.
- "Reason Alone: A Reply to Father Sebastian Bowden," Fortnightly Review, Vol. LIV, 1890.
- "A Catholic Theologian on Natural Religion," Fortnightly Review, Vol. LIV, 1890.
- "Qualities of the Bourgeoisie," Fortnightly Review, Vol. XLVIII, 1890.
- "Scientific Prospects of Labor," Fortnightly Review, Vol. XLVIII, 1890.
- "The Rights of the Weak," National Review, 1890.
- "Through Three Civilizations," Scribner's Magazine, February 1890.
- "The Relation of Art to Truth," The Forum, Vol. IX, March 1890.
- "The Individualist Ideal," The New Review, Vol. IV, No. 21, 1891.
- "A Human Document," Fortnightly Review, Vol. LVI, 1891.
- "Public Life and Private Morals," Fortnightly Review, Vol. LV, 1891.
- "Trade-Unionism and Utopia," The Forum, Vol. XI, April 1891.
- "Wanted: A New Corrupt Practices Act," National Review, Vol. XX, 1892.
- "Amateur Christianity," Fortnightly Review, Vol. LVII, 1892.
- "Poetry and Lord Lytton," Fortnightly Review, Vol. LVII, 1892.
- "The Souls," Fortnightly Review, Vol. LII, 1892.
- "Le Style C'est L'Homme," The New Review, Vol. VI, 1892.
- "Lady Jeune on London Society," The North American Review, July 1892.
- "Are Scott, Dickens, and Thackeray Obsolete?," The Forum, December 1892.
- "The Divisibility of Wealth," New Review, Vol. VIII, 1893
- "A Common Ground of Agreement for All Parties," The National Review, Vol. XXI, 1893.
- "The Causes of the National Income," The National Review, Vol. XXI, 1893.
- "Capital: Fixed and Circulating," The National Review, Vol. XXI, 1893.
- "Wealth, Labour and Ability," The National Review, Vol. XXI, 1893.
- "The Future Income of Labour," The National Review, Vol. XXI, 1893.
- "The Spontaneous Diffusion of Wealth," The National Review, Vol. XXI, 1893.
- "Social Remedies of the Labor Party," Fortnightly Review, Vol. LIII, 1893.
- "Conservatism and Democracy," Quarterly Review, Vol. CLXXVI, January/April 1893.
- "Who Are the Greatest Wealth Producers?," The North American Review, June 1893.
- "The Productivity of the Individual," The North American Review, November 1893.
- "Socialist in a Corner," Fortnightly Review, Vol. LV, 1894.
- "Fabian Economics," Fortnightly Review, Vol. LV, 1894.
- "Heart of Life," Fortnightly Review, Vol. LVI, 1894.
- "How Socialism Differs From Individualism," Public Opinion, Vol. XVII, 1894.
- "The Minimum of Humane Living," Pall Mall Magazine, January 1894.
- "Fashion and Intellect," The North American Review, June 1894.
- "The Significance of Modern Poverty," The North American Review, September 1894.
- "Physics and Sociology," Contemporary Review, Vol. LXVIII, 1895.
- "Religion of Humanity," Nineteenth Century, Vol. XXXVIII, 1895.
- "The Census and the Condition of the People," The Pall Mall Magazine, Vol. V, January/April, 1895.
- "The Real 'Quintessence of Socialism'," The Forum, Vol. XIX, April 1895.
- "Is an Income Tax Socialistic?," The Forum, Vol. XIX, August 1895.
- "Demand and Supply under Socialism,"]The Forum, Vol. XX, October 1895.
- "Bimetallism and the Nature of Money," Fortnightly Review, Vol. LX, 1896.
- "Altruism in Economics," The Forum, August 1896.
- "Unrecognized Essence of Democracy," Fortnightly Review, Vol. LXII, 1897.
- "New Study of Natural Religion," Fortnightly Review, Vol. LXII, 1897.
- "The Buck-Jumping of Labor," The Nineteenth Century, XLII, No. 247, September 1897.
- "The Theoretical Foundation of Socialism: A Reply to Mr. Hyndman," Cosmopolis, Vol. IX, February 1898.
- "Does the Church of England Teach Anything?," The Nineteenth Century, Vol. XLIV, July/December, 1898.
- "Mr. Herbert Spencer in Self Defense," The Nineteenth Century, Vol. XLIV, July/December, 1898.
- "The Intellectual Future of Catholicism," Nineteenth Century, Vol. XLVI, 1899.
- "The Comedy of Christian Science," National Review, Vol. XXXIII, 1899.
- "The Limitations of Art," The Anglo-Saxon Review, Vol. V, June 1900.
- "A Squire’s Household in the Reign of George I," The Anglo-Saxon Review, Vol. VIII, March 1901.
- "Religion and Science," Part II, Fortnightly Review, September/November 1901.
- "A New Light on the Bacon-Shakespeare Cypher," The Nineteenth Century and After, Vol. L, July/December 1901.
- "The Alleged Economic Decay of Great Britain," The Monthly Review, Vol. VI, 1902.
- "Mrs. Gallup’s Cypher Story – Bacon-Shakespeare-Pope," The Nineteenth Century and After, Vol. LI, January/June, 1902.
- "The Latest Shipwreck of Metaphysics," The Nineteenth Century and After, Vol. LI, January/June, 1902.
- "Last Words on Mrs. Gallup’s Alleged Cypher," The Nineteenth Century and After, Vol. LII, July/December, 1902.
- "The Myth of the Big and Little Loaf," Fortnightly Review, Vol. LXXIV, 1903.
- "The Secret of Carlyle's Life," Fortnightly Review, Vol. LXXIX, 1903.
- "The Gospel of Mr. F. W. H. Myers," The Nineteenth Century and After, Vol. LIII, January/June 1893.
- "New Facts Relating to the Bacon – Shakespeare Question," Part II, The Pall Mall Magazine, Vol. XXIX, January/April, 1903.
- "The Great Fiscal Problem," The Nineteenth Century and After, Vol. LIV, July/December, 1903.
- "Free Thought in the Church of England," The Nineteenth Century and After, Vol. LVI, September 1904.
- "Free Thought in the Church of England, a Rejoinder," The Nineteenth Century and After, July/December, 1904.
- "Reconstruction of Belief," The Contemporary Review, Vol. LXXXVII, April 1905.
- "Through Matter and Mind," The Contemporary Review, Vol. LXXXVIII, July 1905.
- "Science and Immortality: A Reply," The North American Review, October 1905.
- "Two Attacks on Science," Fortnightly Review, Vol. LXXXIV, August 1905.
- "Sir Oliver Lodge on Religion and Science," Fortnightly Review, Vol. LXXXIV, November 1905.
- "Christianity as a Natural Religion," The Nineteenth Century and After, Vol. LVIII, July/December, 1905.
- "A Guide to the 'Statistical Abstract'," The Nineteenth Century and After, Vol. LVIII, July/December, 1905.
- "Lodge on Life and Matter," Fortnightly Review, Vol. LXXXVI, July 1906.
- "Great Fortunes and the Community," The North American Review, Vol. CLXXXIII, No. 598, September, 1906.
- "The Expatriation of Capital," The Nineteenth Century and After, Vol. LIX, January/June, 1906.
- "Two Poet Laureates on Life," National Review, August 1906 [Rep. in The Living Age, Vol. CCLI, October 1906].
- "The Political Powers of Labour – Their Extent and Their Limitations," The Nineteenth Century and After, Vol. LX, July/December, 1906.
- "A Critical Examination of Socialism," The North American Review, No. 613, 19 April 1907; No. 614, 3 May 1907; No. 615, 17 May 1907; No. 616, 7 June 1907.
- "First Impressions of America," The Outlook, Vol. LXXXVI, June 1907.
- "Christian Socialism," Putnam's Monthly, Vol. III, October, 1907/March, 1908.
- "Persuasive Socialism," The Nineteenth Century and After, Vol. LXIII, January/June, 1908.
- "Correspondence – Mr. Mallock Replies," The New Age, Vol. II, No. 23, 11 April 1908.
- "A Century of Socialistic Experiments," The Dublin Review, Vol. CXLV, No. 290-291, July/October, 1909.
- "The Missing Essentials in Economic Science," Part II, The Nineteenth Century and After, Vol. LXV, January/June, 1909; Part III, Vol. LXVI, July/December, 1909.
- "Phantom Millions," The Nineteenth Century and After, Vol. LXVI, July/December, 1909.
- "The Possibilities of an Income Tax According with the Scheme of Pitt," The Nineteenth Century and After, Vol. LXVI, March 1910.
- "The Facts at the Back of Unemployment," The Nineteenth Century and After, Vol. LXIX, January/June, 1911.
- "Socialistic Ideas and Practical Politics," The Nineteenth Century and After, April 1912.
- "Labour Unrest as a Subject of Official Investigation," The Nineteenth Century and After, Vol. LXXI, 1912.
- "The Intellectual Bankruptcy of Socialism," The National Review, August 1912.
- "Women in Parliament," Nineteenth Century and After, Vol. LXXII, 1912.
- "The Social Data of Radicalism," Nineteenth Century and After, Vol. LXXIII, 1913.
- "A Catholic Critique of Current Social Theories," The Dublin Review, Vol. CLV, No. 311, July 1914.
- "War Expenditure of the United Kingdom," Fortnightly Review, Vol. CIV, August 1915.
- "Cost of War, the Limits of Supertaxation," Nineteenth Century and After, Vol. LXXVIII, September 1915.
- "The Distribution of Incomes," The North American Review, June 1916.
- "Capital and the Cost of the War," Nineteenth Century and After, Vol. LXXXIII, January 1918.
- "Memories of Men and Places," Harper's Weekly, May/June, 1920.

Translations

- "Lucretius on Life and Death," The Anglo-Saxon Review, Vol. III, December 1899.
- "The Bridal Hymns of Catullus," The Anglo-Saxon Review, Vol. VII, December 1900.

== See also ==
- John Henry Newman
- Russell Kirk
- William Allingham
