= The Sign of Four (1983 film) =

- Genre: Crime; mystery
- Based on: The Sign of the Four by Arthur Conan Doyle
- Screenplay by: Charles Edward Pogue
- Directed by: Desmond Davis
- Starring: Ian Richardson; David Healy; Thorley Walters; Cherie Lunghi
- Music by: Harry Rabinowitz
- Country of origin: United Kingdom
- Original language: English

Production
- Executive producer: Sy Weintraub
- Producer: Otto Plaschkes
- Cinematography: Dennis C. Lewiston
- Editor: Timothy Gee
- Running time: 103 minutes
- Production company: Mapleton Films

Original release
- Network: HBO
- Release: 7 December 1983

The Sign of Four (also known as Sir Arthur Conan Doyle's The Sign of Four) is a 1983 British made-for-television mystery film directed by Desmond Davis and starring Ian Richardson and David Healy. The film is based on Sir Arthur Conan Doyle's 1890 novel of the same name, the second novel to feature Sherlock Holmes and Doctor Watson.

== Production ==
In 1982, American producer Sy Weintraub partnered with English producer Otto Plaschkes to make six television films of Sherlock Holmes stories. Charles Edward Pogue was enlisted to pen the screenplays but only The Sign of the Four and The Hound of the Baskervilles were ultimately filmed as Granada Television's Sherlock Holmes series premiered in 1984.

In an interview with Scarlet Street, Ian Richardson explained:

That was the fly in our ointment. Initially, an unseen fly. You see, when Sy Weintraub was planning the films, he was unaware that the copyright on the Holmes stories was about to expire in England and he had to go through a great deal of legal negotiations with the Conan Doyle estate in order to gain permission to use them. However, he was totally ignorant of Granada's plans to film a series with Jeremy Brett...Weintraub was furious, because he'd paid a lot of money to get permission from the estate and here was Granada saying, "Thank you - but we're going to do it." So Weintraub took them to court. He had a very good case, apparently; but eventually there was an out of court settlement for an extraordinary sum of money - something like two million pounds - which was enough for Weintraub to cover his costs on both The Sign of Four and The Hound of the Baskervilles, and make a profit, too. And so he wrapped the project up.

The Sign of Four was shot simultaneously with The Hound of the Baskervilles but the schedule precluded having David Healy portray Watson in both films so Donald Churchill was enlisted to play the role in The Hound of the Baskervilles. Two previous Watsons appear in the film: Terence Rigby who played Watson to Tom Baker's Holmes in 1982s The Hound of the Baskervilles and Thorley Walters who played Watson three times previously; with Christopher Lee as Holmes in Sherlock Holmes and the Deadly Necklace, with Douglas Wilmer as Holmes in The Adventure of Sherlock Holmes' Smarter Brother and with Christopher Plummer as Holmes in Silver Blaze. Clive Merrison, who plays Bartholomew Sholto, would go on to play Holmes in the long running radio series.

== Cast ==
- Ian Richardson as Sherlock Holmes
- David Healy as Dr. John H. Watson
- Thorley Walters as Major John Sholto
- Cherie Lunghi as Mary Morstan
- Joe Melia as Jonathan Small
- John Pedrick as Tonga
- Clive Merrison as Bartholomew Sholto
- Richard Heffer as Thaddeus Sholto
- Terence Rigby as Inspector Layton
- Michael O'Hagan as Mordecai Smith
- Robert Russell as Williams

== Differences from novel ==
- The plot includes the recovery of the Agra treasure, which here was hidden in Small's wooden leg as he attempts to claim he disposed of it in the Thames. After Holmes realises what has happened due to the wooden leg's suspicious weight in the water, the treasure is claimed by the police (although its most precious piece, a large diamond called the Great Mogul, is given to Mary by Holmes). In the novel, Small disposes of the entire treasure into the Thames.
- Unlike the source novel, the movie features the murder of Thaddeus Sholto, where Small returns to the house to try and intimidate him into revealing the location of the treasure, beating Sholto to death in a rage when Sholto claims that it was given away long ago.
- While Watson expresses a strong attraction for Miss Morstan, a romantic development between the two characters is not implied in the movie, being displayed only in slight "romantic touches".
- The original novel features a local detective named Athelney Jones working in tandem with Holmes and Watson. In this version, the detective's name has been changed to "Layton".
