= The Hound of the Baskervilles (1983 film) =

1983 film directed by Douglas Hickox

- Genre: Mystery; thriller
- Based on: The Hound of the Baskervilles by Arthur Conan Doyle
- Written by: Charles Edward Pogue
- Directed by: Douglas Hickox
- Starring: Ian Richardson; Donald Churchill; Martin Shaw
- Theme music composer: Michael J. Lewis
- Country of origin: United Kingdom
- Original language: English

Production
- Executive producer: Sy Weintraub
- Producer: Otto Plaschkes
- Cinematography: Ronnie Taylor
- Editor: Malcolm Cooke
- Running time: 100 minutes
- Production company: Mapleton Films

Original release
- Network: HBO
- Release: November 3, 1983

The Hound of the Baskervilles (a.k.a. Sir Arthur Conan Doyle's The Hound of the Baskervilles) is a 1983 British made-for-television mystery thriller film directed by Douglas Hickox, starring Ian Richardson as Sherlock Holmes and Donald Churchill as Dr. John H. Watson. It is based on Arthur Conan Doyle's 1902 novel The Hound of the Baskervilles.

== Plot ==
Sherlock Holmes is given news of the late Sir Charles' death, and the legend of the hound which is said to have killed the evil Sir Hugo Baskerville in retaliation for his brutal and violent rape of a beautiful farm girl. Holmes prepares to save Sir Henry Baskerville — nephew and heir of Sir Charles, and next in line to die from the hound.

== Cast ==
- Ian Richardson as Sherlock Holmes
- Donald Churchill as Dr. John H. Watson
- Denholm Elliott as Dr. Mortimer
- Martin Shaw as Sir Henry Baskerville
  - Kerry Shale as the voice of Sir Henry (uncredited)
- Nicholas Clay as Jack Stapleton / Sir Hugo Baskerville
- Ronald Lacey as Inspector Lestrade
- Edward Judd as Barrymore
- Eleanor Bron as Mrs. Barrymore
- Brian Blessed as Geoffrey Lyons
- Connie Booth as Laura Lyons
- Glynis Barber as Beryl Stapleton
- David Langton as Sir Charles Baskerville
- Peter Rutherford as Selden
- Cindy O'Callaghan as Maid
- Eric Richard as Cabbie
- Michael Burrell as Shopkeeper
- Francesca Gonshaw as Young Girl in Mire

== Production ==
In 1982, American producer Sy Weintraub partnered with English producer Otto Plaschkes to make six television films of Sherlock Holmes stories. Charles Edward Pogue was enlisted to pen the screenplays but only The Sign of the Four and The Hound of the Baskervilles were ultimately filmed before Granada Television's Sherlock Holmes series premiered in 1984. A proposed third film, Hands of a Murderer (originally entitled The Prince of Crime) was eventually made with Edward Woodward as Sherlock Holmes and John Hillerman as Dr. John H. Watson.

In an interview with Scarlet Street, Ian Richardson explained:

"That was the fly in our ointment. Initially, an unseen fly. You see, when Sy Weintraub was planning the films, he was unaware that the copyright on the Holmes stories was about to expire in England and he had to go through a great deal of legal negotiations with the Conan Doyle estate in order to gain permission to use them. However, he was totally ignorant of Granada's plans to film a series with Jeremy Brett...Weintraub was furious, because he'd paid a lot of money to get permission from the estate and here was Granada saying, 'Thank you - but we're going to do it.' So Weintraub took them to court. He had a very good case, apparently; but eventually there was an out of court settlement for an extraordinary sum of money - something like two million pounds - which was enough for Weintraub to cover his costs on both The Sign of Four and The Hound of the Baskervilles, and make a profit, too. And so he wrapped the project up."

Denholm Elliott was cast as Dr. Mortimer having previously portrayed Stapleton in the comedy spoof version of the Hound starring Dudley Moore and Peter Cook. He also appeared with "Hound" co-star Connie Booth in the spoof The Strange Case of the End of Civilization as We Know It. Booth herself would later appear in 1987s The Return of Sherlock Holmes.

=== Differences from novel ===
- In the original novel, after the farm girl kidnapped by Sir Hugo Baskerville escapes, Hugo chases her across the moor and his companions find the girl dead from fear and Hugo killed by the hound. The film differs from the novel by having the girl acquire one of the manor's horses in her escape, and is pursued by Hugo alone. The pack of beagles Hugo sets out on her and his companions who follow him are omitted. The girl stumbles upon the Grimpen Mire and her horse drowns. She is pulled out and raped by Hugo; the girl survives when Hugo is fatally mauled by the Hound.
- A sniping attempt which does not occur in the original novel is made against Sir Henry.
- Inspector Lestrade is assigned the task of arresting Seldon. Unlike previous versions of the story, he is revealed to be the policeman who arrested Seldon. In the film climax's, his role in helping Holmes and Watson killing the hound is replaced by Dr. Mortimer in bringing Sir Charles' murderer to justice.
- The character Geoffrey Lyons never appears in the novel. The film's Geoffrey Lyons performs the feat of bending a fire iron as an intimidation tactic which was originally performed by Dr. Grimesby Roylott in "The Adventure of the Speckled Band". In the film version, Lyons is presented as an imposing suspect who is at one point falsely imprisoned for killing his wife. Holmes' solution to the case ultimately clears him.
- Laura Lyons dies in the film, strangled by the murderer to protect his identity. She does not die in the novel.
- Stapleton's demise in the bog is included as a part of the film's climax. He ambushes Holmes, Watson and Beryl outside the Hound's lair, but is chased by Holmes into the moor; he stumbles into the mire and sinks to his doom, despite Holmes' attempts to save him. The novel does not depict Stapleton's demise; he simply disappears on the moor and is assumed to have drowned in the mire.

== Reception ==
Cinema Retro called the film "a cracking piece of entertainment...with lush production values that completely belie its TV movie origins." Matthew Bunson in The Encyclopedia Sherlockiana praised the "first rate" production and Ronald Lacey's performance as Lestrade but felt that Richardson's interpretation of Holmes was "a bit too amiable." Dr Lenera praised the production but criticised the violence, particularly the rape scene, calling it "quite a grim affair, at least for a 1983 TV production".
