= The Scarlet Pimpernel (1982 film) =

- DVD cover
- Directed by: Clive Donner
- Screenplay by: William Bast
- Based on: The Scarlet Pimpernel1905 novel by Baroness Emma Orczy; Eldorado 1913 novel by Baroness Emma Orczy
- Produced by: David Conroy
- Starring: Anthony Andrews; Jane Seymour; Ian McKellen
- Cinematography: Denis Lewiston
- Edited by: Peter Tanner
- Music by: Nick Bicât
- Production company: London Films
- Distributed by: CBS
- Release date: 9 November 1982 (US)
- Running time: 142 minutes
- Country: United Kingdom
- Language: English

The Scarlet Pimpernel is a 1982 British romantic adventure television film set during the French Revolution. It is based on the novels The Scarlet Pimpernel (1905) and Eldorado (1913) by Baroness Emmuska Orczy, and stars Anthony Andrews as Sir Percy Blakeney/the Scarlet Pimpernel, the protagonist, Jane Seymour as Marguerite St. Just, the love interest, and Ian McKellen as Chauvelin, the antagonist.

In 1792 during the Reign of Terror, the Scarlet Pimpernel rescues French aristocrats while posing as the wealthy but foppish and seemingly empty-headed Sir Percival Blakeney. Percy marries the beautiful French actress Marguerite St. Just, but her previous relationship with Robespierre's agent Paul Chauvelin may endanger the Pimpernel's plans to save the young Dauphin, eldest son of the former King of France. The story differs from the books, but is largely inspired by them.

== Plot ==
In 1792 during the Reign of Terror of the French Revolution, a secret league of brave Englishmen are rescuing French aristocrats from the Guillotine. The leader of this secret society is a mysterious English nobleman known only as the Scarlet Pimpernel, whose signature sign is a humble wayside flower. In society, he hides his identity by posing as the wealthy but foppish and seemingly empty-headed Sir Percy Blakeney. After rescuing the Count de Beaulieu and his family, Percy is introduced to the beautiful French actress Marguerite St. Just through her brother, Armand, whom he rescued from an attack. Percy is attracted to Marguerite, but she is in a relationship with Paul Chauvelin, an agent of Maximilien Robespierre. Due to the Scarlet Pimpernel's past successes, Chauvelin is assigned to discover his identity and capture him.

After Percy and his associates smuggle another aristocrat out of the city while picnicking with Marguerite, Chauvelin deduces that the Scarlet Pimpernel must be an English nobleman and tries to coerce the Count de Tournay to spy on the English court for the Republic. Later, Marguerite and Chauvelin argue over the executions, and he angrily departs. Percy reveals his identity to Armand and convinces him to use his connections to Chauvelin to investigate the French prison holding the Dauphin, son of the former King of France. Soon after, the Scarlet Pimpernel and his associates rescue de Tournay's family.

Following a passionate courtship, Percy marries Marguerite, but soon their happiness is interrupted when he discovers that she apparently caused the arrest warrant to be served on the Marquis de St. Cyr and his family, the man responsible for the previous attack on Armand. This leads to beheadings of the entire St. Cyr family. Believing that she was seeking revenge and is still in league with Chauvelin, Percy becomes distrustful of his new wife. Unaware of her husband's knowledge of her extorted role in the deaths of the St. Cyr family, Marguerite unhappily notices his growing disdain for her and married life. Armand advises Percy to tell Marguerite about his suspicions so that she may defend herself, but Percy refuses, even though he admits he will love her until the day he dies.

Soon after, Chauvelin discovers that Armand is in league with the Scarlet Pimpernel and summons him back to Paris. Blackmailing Marguerite by threatening her brother's life, Chauvelin coerces her into discovering the vigilante's identity. After finding that the Scarlet Pimpernel is to rendezvous at midnight, Marguerite tells Chauvelin. However, she immediately warns the Scarlet Pimpernel, in actuality and unbeknownst to her, her husband, and adds that Chauvelin betrayed her trust and faked her signature. Percy's faith in his wife is restored. Having been thwarted from encountering them, Chauvelin angrily leaves for Paris. Percy and his associates also depart for France to save Armand and the Dauphin. Marguerite notices that Percy's family crest bears a scarlet pimpernel and quickly deduces his identity.

After Armand arranges the firing of the gaolers in charge of the Dauphin's care, Percy and his associates use the removal of their belongings to smuggle the Dauphin out of the city. The boy is taken to a castle on the French coast, but Percy is soon captured while trying to save Armand. Marguerite visits her husband in prison, where he tells her to arrange for the Baron de Batz, an Austrian interested in saving the Dauphin, to smuggle the boy out of France the following night. Later, Percy agrees to personally bring Chauvelin to the Dauphin. Chauvelin and Percy, along with Marguerite and Armand, who are hostages, arrive at the castle, but the Dauphin has already been removed.

Angered by the deception, Chauvelin orders Percy's execution, but the firing squad consists of members of the league of the Scarlet Pimpernel, disguised as Chauvelin's troops. Percy is rescued and returns to duel with Chauvelin and is victorious. Percy decides to leave Chauvelin's fate to Robespierre. Impersonating Chauvelin to ensure their escape, Armand departs from the castle with the French troops Chauvelin had stationed there. Percy and Marguerite sail away, happily in love.

== Cast ==
- Anthony Andrews as Sir Percy Blakeney/ the Scarlet Pimpernel, an English aristocrat who plays a foppish dandy in public, but is actually a bold adventurer who carries out daring rescue missions along with his band of followers known as the League of the Scarlet Pimpernel
- Jane Seymour as Marguerite Blakeney (née St. Just), a French actress whom Percy Blakeney meets while in France and subsequently marries
- Ian McKellen as Paul Chauvelin, the chief agent of the Committee of Public Safety tasked with capturing the Scarlet Pimpernel
- James Villiers as the Baron de Batz, an Austrian nobleman involved in a covert operation to rescue the young Dauphin
- Eleanor David as Louise, a French actress and understudy of Marguerite St. Just's, and is Armand St. Just's lover
- Malcolm Jamieson as Armand St. Just, the brother of Marguerite, and later a member of the League of the Scarlet Pimpernel
- Richard Morant as Robespierre, a leader of the French Revolution, who commands Chauvelin to find the identity of the Scarlet Pimpernel
- Dominic Jephcott as Sir Andrew Ffoulkes, a member of the League of the Scarlet Pimpernel
- Christopher Villiers as Lord Antony Dewhurst, a member of the League of the Scarlet Pimpernel
- Denis Lill as the Count de Tournay, a French aristocrat and friend of Percy Blakeney
- Ann Firbank as the Countess de Tournay, the wife of Count de Tournay
- Tracey Childs as Suzanne de Tournay, the daughter of Count and Countess de Tournay, and later fiancée of Sir Andrew Ffoulkes
- Julian Fellowes as the Prince of Wales, the somewhat foppish heir to the British throne and friend of Sir Percy Blakeney
- Mark Drewry as Lord Timothy Hastings, a member of the League of the Scarlet Pimpernel
- John Quarmby as Ponceau, a Frenchman who works for the Committee of Public Safety
- David Gant as Fouquet, a Frenchman who works for Robespierre and the Committee of Public Safety
- Geoffrey Toone as the Marquis de St. Cyr, a French aristocrat who later dies on the guillotine
- Joanna Dickens as Aunt Lulu, the aunt of Louise
- Richard Charles as Louis-Charles, Dauphin of France, the young heir to the French throne being held prisoner by Robespierre
- Gordon Gostelow as Duval, the caretaker of the young Dauphin in prison
- Carol MacReady as Madame Duval, the wife of Duval
- Daphne Anderson as Lady Grenville, an English noblewoman
- Nick Brimble as Bibot, a French soldier
- Tony Caunter as Pochard, a French soldier
- Timothy Carlton as the Count de Beaulieu, a French aristocrat rescued from the guillotine
- Kate Howard as the Countess de Beaulieu, the wife of Count de Beaulieu

== Production ==
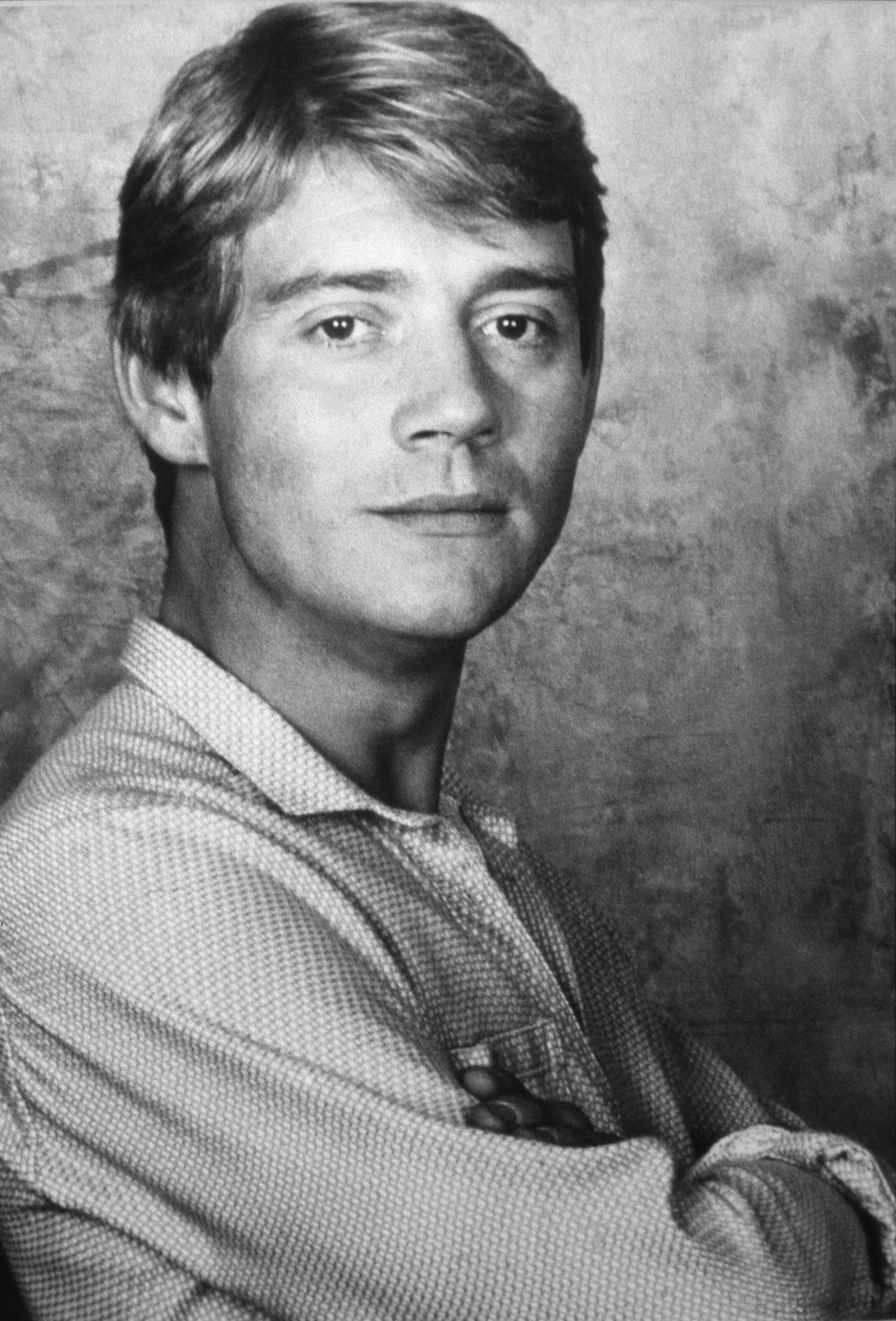
BAFTA-winning actor Anthony Andrews (pictured in 1982) starred as Sir Percival Blakeney and his alter ego the Scarlet Pimpernel

The Scarlet Pimpernel is based on a novel written by Baroness Emma Orczy. The 1982 adaptation was produced by London Films and directed by Clive Donner. Filming took place at various eighteenth century sites in England, including Blenheim Palace, Ragley Hall, Broughton Castle, and Milton Manor; also Lindisfarne. Tony Curtis (Note: Not the actor.) served as the film's designer. The film was expanded to three hours to allow time for the addition of a subplot and extra characters. The subplot, taken from another of Orczy's novels, detailed the successful rescue of the Dauphin from a French prison.

Anthony Andrews had recently won the BAFTA for Best Actor for his performance in the 1981 serial Brideshead Revisited, and was cast as Sir Percy Blakeney/Scarlet Pimpernel. In addition to that serial, Andrews was also known to American audiences through the PBS ITV& BBC shows Danger UXB and The Duchess of Duke Street as well as several other productions. London Films hoped that this popularity would lead to Andrews starring in a Scarlet Pimpernel series in the US, but this never occurred. Other cast members included Ian McKellen and Jane Seymour. The recipient of a Golden Globe nomination for East of Eden, Seymour was cast as Marguerite St. Just. She later played Marie Antoinette in the 1989 film La Révolution française.

== Reception ==
=== Critical response ===
The New York Times staff writer John J. O'Connor praised Anthony Andrews' performance as both the heroic and foppish Percy Blakeney. Ian McKellen's acting as Paul Chauvelin was also highlighted, as O'Connor felt he was "marvelously subtle" in giving "an intricately etched portrait of social envy and sexual jealousy." People called it a "rousingly suspenseful melodramatization".

In his 2006 work Stage Combat Resource Materials: A Selected And Annotated Bibliography, author J. Michael Kirkland referred to the sword fight between Percy and Chauvelin as "nicely staged, if somewhat repetitious ... but still entertaining." Kirkland also observed that the weapons used were in fact German sabres, which were not used during the Napoleonic era.

=== Awards and nominations ===
At the 35th Primetime Emmy Awards, The Scarlet Pimpernel's costume designer Phyllis Dalton won the Emmy Award for Outstanding Costume Design for a Limited Series or a Special. The film also received nominations for Outstanding Drama Special (for producer David Conroy and executive producer Mark Shelmerdine) and Outstanding Art Direction for a Limited Series or a Special (for production designer Tony Curtis and set decorator Carolyn Scott).

== Legacy ==
Romantic novelist Lauren Willig has cited the 1982 film as "the most direct inspiration" for her 2005 work The Secret History of the Pink Carnation.
