= Hands of a Murderer =

- Genre: Mystery
- Written by: Charles Edward Pogue
- Directed by: Stuart Orme
- Starring: Edward Woodward; John Hillerman; Anthony Andrews; Kim Thomson
- Music by: Colin Towns
- Country of origin: United Kingdom
- Original language: English

Production
- Executive producer: William F. Storke
- Producers: Robert E. Fuisz; Norman Foster; Charles Edward Pogue
- Cinematography: Ken Westbury
- Editor: Keith Palmer
- Running time: 90 minutes
- Production company: Green Pond Productions

Original release
- Network: CBS
- Release: May 16, 1990

Hands of a Murderer is a 1990 British made-for-television mystery film directed by Stuart Orme, starring Edward Woodward as Sherlock Holmes and John Hillerman as Dr. John H. Watson.

== Production ==
Filmed in England in association with Yorkshire Television, the film premiered on CBS on 16 May 1990.

The screenplay was by Charles Edward Pogue who had also written the earlier Ian Richardson Sherlock Holmes films, The Sign of Four and The Hound of the Baskervilles and was initially intended to be a part of that series of films.

== Cast ==
- Edward Woodward as Sherlock Holmes
- John Hillerman as Dr. John H. Watson
- Anthony Andrews as Professor Moriarty
- Kim Thomson as Sophie DeVere
- Peter Jeffrey as Mycroft Holmes
- Warren Clarke as Col. Gould
- Terence Lodge as Inspector Lestrade

== Reception ==
Reviews for the film were decidedly mixed. People gave the film a B review in its "picks and pans" column. According to Matthew E. Bunson in his Encyclopedia Sherlockiana, "this is a surprisingly disappointing production despite the best efforts of all concerned and lavish attention to detail." Alan Barnes in Sherlock Holmes on Screen wrote that the film "is no more than a number of high-concept set-pieces linked by the flimsiest of stories."
