= Anthony Andrews =

British actor (born 1948)

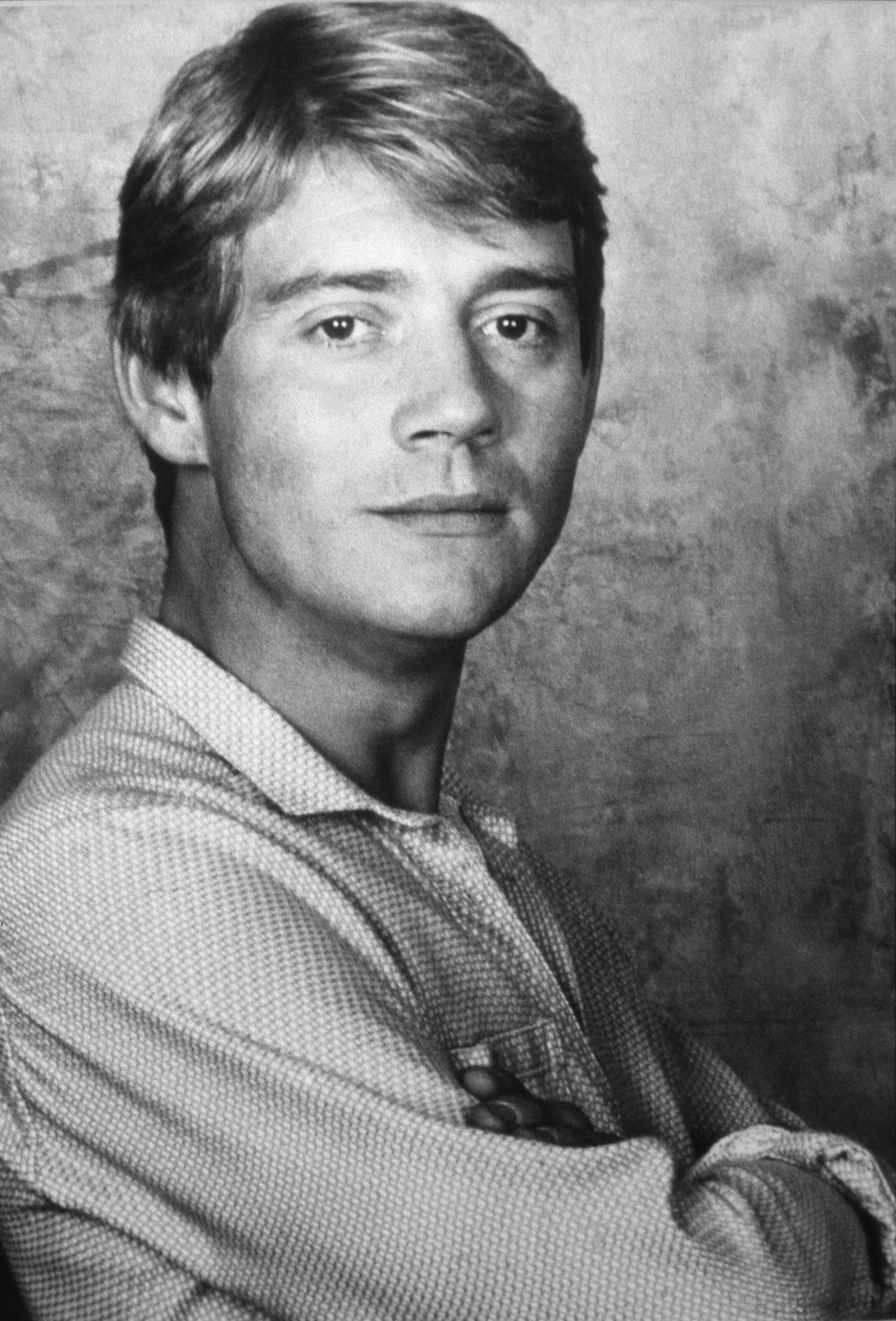
- Portrait by Allan Warren, 1982
- Born: Anthony Colin Gerald Andrews; 12 January 1948 (age 78); Finchley, London, England
- Occupation: Actor
- Spouse: Georgina Simpson (m. 1971)
- Children: 3

Anthony Colin Gerald Andrews (born 12 January 1948) is an English actor. He played Lord Sebastian Flyte in the ITV miniseries Brideshead Revisited (1981), for which he won Golden Globe and BAFTA television awards and was nominated for an Emmy. His other lead roles include Operation Daybreak (1975), Danger UXB (1979), Ivanhoe (1982) and The Scarlet Pimpernel (1982), and he played UK Prime Minister Stanley Baldwin in The King's Speech (2010).

== Early life and career ==
Andrews was born in London, the son of Geraldine Agnes (née Cooper), a dancer, and Stanley Thomas Andrews, an arranger and conductor for the BBC. He grew up in North Finchley, London. At the age of eight, he took dancing lessons, making his stage debut as the White Rabbit in a stage adaptation of Lewis Carroll's Alice in Wonderland. He attended the Royal Masonic School for Boys in Bushey, Hertfordshire.

After a series of jobs that included catering, farming and journalism, he secured a position at the Chichester Theatre, where he worked as an assistant stage manager and later as a stand-in producer. In 1968, he auditioned for a production of Alan Bennett's play Forty Years On, which featured John Gielgud as the headmaster of a British public school during the World War I period. Andrews was cast as Skinner, one of 20 schoolboys. In 1974, he played Lord Robert, Marquis of Stockbridge, in the TV series Upstairs, Downstairs. In 1975, he had a leading role in the Spanish film Las adolescentes (The Adolescents), opposite Koo Stark.

In June 1977, Andrews was cast as Bodie in the ITV series The Professionals, but after three days of filming, the creator and producer Brian Clemens believed the chemistry between Andrews and Martin Shaw (Doyle) did not work and that "the pair did not have the required undercurrent of menace to carry off the concept". Lewis Collins replaced Andrews. In 1979, Andrews was the main star of the ITV television series Danger UXB, playing a bomb disposal officer in the London Blitz. The series first aired in the United Kingdom in 1979 on the ITV network.

His subsequent work includes the leading role of Lord Sebastian Flyte in Brideshead Revisited (1981). In 1982, he won a Golden Globe and BAFTA TV Award for his performance and was nominated for an Emmy Award. In the United States, Andrews is best known for his portrayal of the titular character in the television film Ivanhoe as well as that of Sir Percy Blakeney in the film The Scarlet Pimpernel (both 1982).

At the National Theatre in London, he appeared in Coming in to Land (1986/1987) by Stephen Poliakoff, alongside Dame Maggie Smith. He also played Henry Higgins in a stage version of My Fair Lady (2003) and Count Fosco in Andrew Lloyd Webber's The Woman in White (2005).

Andrews narrated a 21st-anniversary BBC Radio 2 special broadcast of Cameron Mackintosh's musical Les Misérables, sung by the then West End cast at the Mermaid Theatre in London on Sunday 8 October 2006. He appeared as Prime Minister Stanley Baldwin in the film The King's Speech (2010), for which he and his castmates won a 2011 Screen Actors Guild Award for Outstanding Performance by a Cast in a Motion Picture.

== Personal life ==
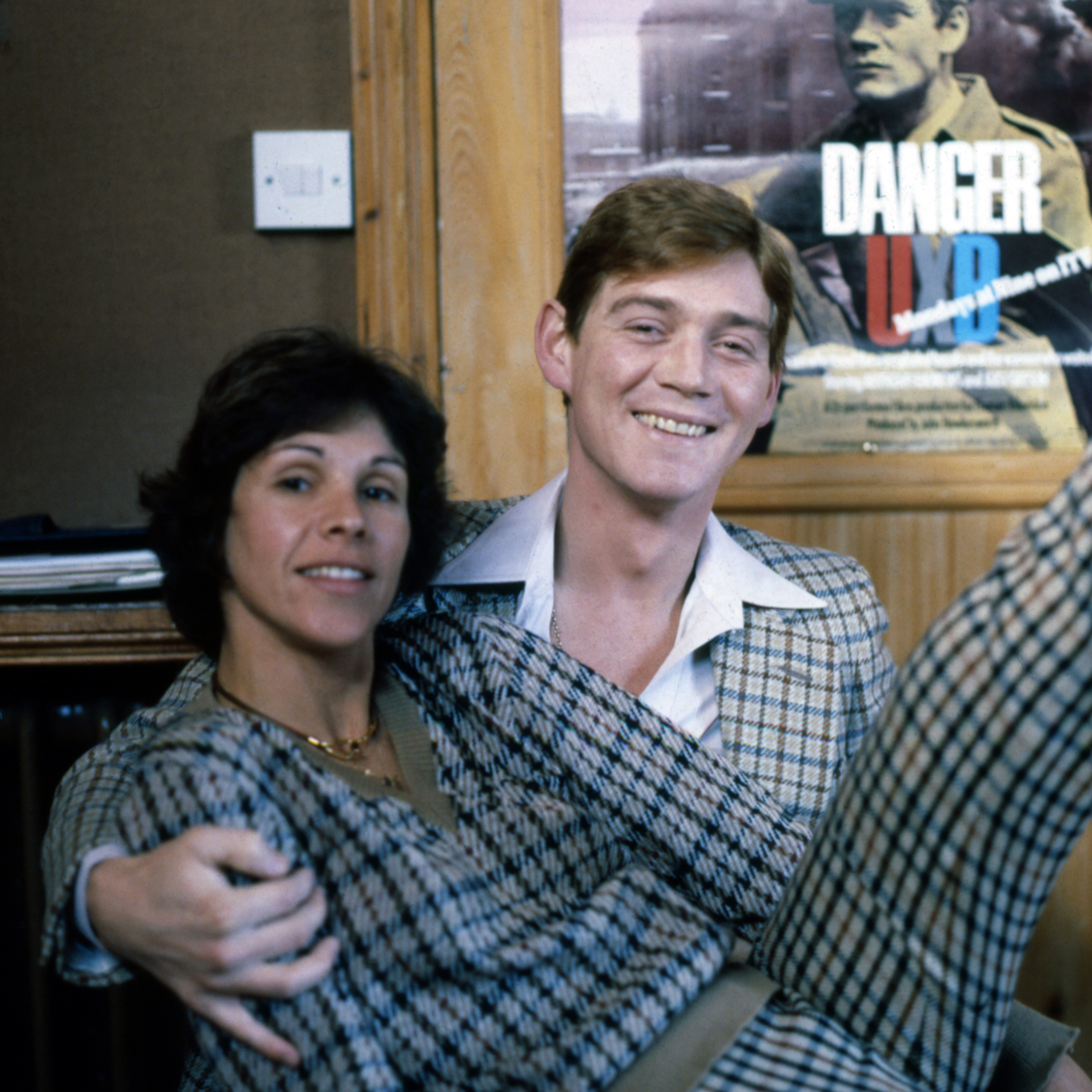
Andrews and his wife, Georgina Simpson, c. 1980

Andrews met actress Georgina Simpson, whose family owned the Simpsons of Piccadilly Department Store. They married on 1 December 1971 and have three children.

Andrews survived a case of water intoxication in 2003. The condition, also known as hyponatraemia ("low blood sodium"), occurs when sodium ions in the body are diluted so much that nerves are unable to function properly. The condition has symptoms similar to those of dehydration, such as headaches, nausea and cramps. While performing as Henry Higgins in My Fair Lady, Andrews consumed up to eight litres of water a day. He lost consciousness and spent three days in intensive care.

== Filmography ==
=== Film ===
Year	Title	Role	Notes
1972	A War of Children	Reg Hogg	TV film
1972	A Day Out	Brothers	TV film
1973	Take Me High	Hugo Flaxman	
1974	Percy's Progress	Catchpole	
1975	The Adolescents	Jimmy	
1975	Operation Daybreak	Jozef Gabčík	
1976	Call Girl	Marcos	
1978	Much Ado About Nothing	Claudio	TV film
1981	Mistress of Paradise	Buckley	TV film
1982	Ivanhoe	Wilfred of Ivanhoe	TV film
1982	La Ronde	The Young Gentleman	TV film
1982	The Scarlet Pimpernel	Sir Percy Blakeney	TV film
1983	Sparkling Cyanide	Tony Browne	TV film
1984	Under the Volcano	Hugh Firmin	
1985	The Holcroft Covenant	Johann von Tiebolt	
1986	The Second Victory	Major Hanlon	
1987	The Lighthorsemen	Major Richard Meinertzhagen	
1988	Bluegrass	Michael Fitzgerald	TV film
1988	The Woman He Loved	Prince of Wales	TV film
1988	Hanna's War	McCormack	
1990	Hands of a Murderer	Professor Moriarty	TV film
1991	Lost in Siberia	Andrei Miller	
1995	Haunted	Robert Mariell	
2000	David Copperfield	Edward Murdstone	TV film
2007	Last Night	Dad	Short film
2010	The King's Speech	Stanley Baldwin	
2019	The Professor and the Madman	Benjamin Jowett	

=== Television ===
Year	Title	Role	Notes
1968	The Wednesday Play	Harry	Episode: "A Beast with Two Backs"
1972	Dixon of Dock Green	Paul Richards	Episode: "First Offenders"
1972	Doomwatch	Carlos	Episode: "Say Knife, Fat Man"
1972	Follyfoot	Lord Beck	Episode: "The Awakening"
1972	Thirty-Minute Theatre	Michael Warren	Episode: "The Judge's Wife"
1974	The Fortunes of Nigel	Sir Nigel Olifaunt	Mini-series, 5 episodes
1974	QB VII	Stephen Kelno	Mini-series, 2 episodes
1974	The Pallisers	Earl of Silverbridge	Recurring role, 7 episodes
1974-1975	David Copperfield	Steerforth	Mini-series, 4 episodes
1975	Upstairs, Downstairs	Marquis (sic) of Stockbridge	Recurring role, 3 episodes
1976	The Duchess of Duke Street	Marcus Carrington	Episode: "Lottie's Boy"
1976	BBC Play of the Month	Hon. Alan Howard	Episode: "French Without Tears"
1976	BBC Play of the Month	Charles Courtley	Episode: "London Assurance"
1977	Wings	Lieutenant Walker	Episode: "The Prisoner's Friend"
1977	The Sunday Drama	Harry	Episode: "A Superstition"
1977	BBC Play of the Month	Horner	Episode: "The Country Wife"
1978	BBC Television Shakespeare	Mercutio	Episode: "Romeo and Juliet"
1979	Danger UXB	Brian Ash	Series regular, 13 episodes
1981	The Love Boat	Tony Selkirk	Recurring role, 3 episodes
1981	Brideshead Revisited	Sebastian Flyte	Recurring role, 6 episodes
1984	Play for Today	John Loomis	Episode: "Z for Zachariah"
1985	A.D.	Nero	Mini-series, 5 episodes
1988	American Playhouse	Johnnie Aysgarth	Episode: "Suspicion"
1988	Bluegrass	Michael Fitzgerald	TV movie
1989	A Fine Romance	Michael Trent	Episode: "Pilot"
1989	Columbo	Elliott Blake	Episode: "Columbo Goes to the Guillotine"
1989	Nightmare Classics	Dr. Henry Jekyll/Mr. Edward Hyde	Episode: "Strange Case of Dr Jekyll and Mr Hyde"
1992	Danielle Steel's Jewels	William Whitfield	Mini-series, 2 episodes
1992	Screen Two	Christopher Edwardes	Episode: "The Law Lord"
1996	The Ruth Rendell Mysteries	Luke Crossland	Episode: "Heartstones"
1996	Tales from the Crypt	Jonathan	Episode: "About Face"
1997	Screen Two	Robin	Episode: "Mothertime"
2001	Love in a Cold Climate	Boy	Mini-series, 3 episodes
2003	Cambridge Spies	King George VI	Mini-series, 1 episode
2004	Rosemary & Thyme	Richard Oakley	Episode: "The Invisible Worm"
2006	Agatha Christie's Marple	Tommy	Episode: "By the Pricking of My Thumbs"
2012	Birdsong	Colonel Barclay	Mini-series, 1 episode
2015	The Syndicate	Lord Hazelwood	Series regular, 6 episodes
2020	The English Game	Lord Kinnaird	Recurring role, 5 episodes

=== Theatre ===
Year	Title	Role	Venue	Notes
1968	Dragon Variations	Douglas Blake	Duke of York's Theatre, London	
1968	Forty Years On	Skinner	Apollo Theatre, London	
1971	Romeo and Juliet	Balthasar	Regent's Park Open Air Theatre, London	with New Shakespeare Company
1971	A Midsummer Night's Dream	Mustardseed	Regent's Park Open Air Theatre, London	with New Shakespeare Company
1986	One of Us	Garonway Rees	Greenwich Theatre, London	
1987	Coming Into Land	Neville	Lyttelton Theatre, London	
1999	Vertigo		Theatre Royal, Windsor	
2001	Ghosts	Pastor Manders	Comedy Theatre, London	
2003	My Fair Lady	Henry Higgins	Drury Lane Theatre, London	
2005	The Woman in White	Count Fosco	Palace Theatre, London	
2007	The Letter	Howard Joyce	Wyndham's Theatre, London	
2011	Bully Boy	Major Oscar Hadley	Nuffield Theatre, Southampton	
2012	A Marvellous Year for Plums	Sir Anthony Eden	Chichester Festival Theatre, Chichester	

== Producing credits ==
- Lost in Siberia (1991)
- Haunted (1995)

== Awards and nominations ==
Year	Award	Category	Work	Result
1982	British Academy Television Awards	Best Actor	Brideshead Revisited	Won
1982	Primetime Emmy Awards	Outstanding Lead Actor in a Limited or Anthology Series or Movie	Brideshead Revisited	Nominated
1983	Golden Globe Awards	Best Performance by an Actor in a Miniseries or Motion Picture Made for Television	Brideshead Revisited	Won
1991	CableACE Award	Best Actor in a Dramatic Series	Nightmare Classics	Nominated
1993	Golden Globe Awards	Best Performance by an Actor in a Miniseries or Motion Picture Made for Television	Danielle Steel's Jewels	Nominated
2011	Santa Barbara International Film Festival	Best Motion Picture Ensemble of the Year (with Claire Bloom, Helena Bonham Carter, Jennifer Ehle, Colin Firth, Michael Gambon, Derek Jacobi, Guy Pearce, Geoffrey Rush & Timothy Spall)	The King's Speech	Won
2011	Screen Actors Guild Awards	Outstanding Performance by a Cast in a Motion Picture (with Helena Bonham Carter, Jennifer Ehle, Colin Firth, Michael Gambon, Derek Jacobi, Guy Pearce, Geoffrey Rush & Timothy Spall)	The King's Speech	Won
