= Wolfe Morris =

English actor (1925–1996)

- Born: Woolf Steinberg; 5 January 1925; Portsmouth, Hampshire, England, United Kingdom
- Died: 21 July 1996 (aged 71); Camden, London, England, United Kingdom
- Occupation: Actor
- Years active: 1955–1995
- Parent(s): Morry Steinberg; Becky Steinberg
- Relatives: Aubrey Morris (brother)

Wolfe Morris (born Woolf Steinberg, 5 January 1925 – 21 July 1996) was an English actor, who played character roles on stage, television and in feature films from the 1950s until the 1990s. He made his film debut in Ill Met by Moonlight. His grandparents were from Kiev and escaped the Russian pogroms, arriving in London in about 1890. The family moved to Portsmouth at the turn of the century. Morris was one of nine children born to Becky (née Levine) and Morry Steinberg. His younger brother, Aubrey Morris, was also an accomplished actor. His daughter Shona Morris became a stage actress.

Morris trained as an actor at the Royal Academy of Dramatic Art, graduating in 1943. In his career, spanning five decades, he appeared in almost 90 different films and TV shows, as well as appearing in numerous stage plays as a member of the Royal Shakespeare Company. His best-known role on television was as Thomas Cromwell in The Six Wives of Henry VIII. In preparation for it, he visited a number of English castles to study the characters' portraits.

In 1968, he played Gollum in the BBC Radio dramatisation of The Hobbit, and later starred as the mad waxworks owner in the Amicus horror anthology film The House That Dripped Blood (1970). His other films included The Abominable Snowman (1957), The Camp on Blood Island (1958), I Only Arsked! (1958), Nine Hours to Rama (1963), The Best House in London (1969), The Mackintosh Man (1973), The Adventure of Sherlock Holmes' Smarter Brother (1975), The Message (1976), Cuba (1979), and The London Connection (1979).

== Partial filmography ==
- Cairo Road (1950) – Ali (uncredited)
- Ill Met by Moonlight (1957) – George
- Interpol (1957) – Morgue attendant
- The Abominable Snowman (1957) – Kusang
- The Camp on Blood Island (1958) – Interpreter
- Further Up the Creek (1958) – Algeroccan Major
- I Only Arsked! (1958) – Salaman
- Yesterday's Enemy (1959) – Informer
- The Clue of the New Pin (1961) – Yeh Ling
- Nine Hours to Rama (1963) – Det. Bose
- For Whom the Bell Tolls (1965) – Kashkin
- Doctor Who (1967, The Abominable Snowmen) - Padmasambhava (5 episodes)
- Sleep Is Lovely (1968) – Policeman #2
- The Best House in London (1969) – Chinese Trade Attache
- One Day in the Life of Ivan Denisovich (1970)
- The Six Wives of Henry VIII (1970) - Thomas Cromwell
- The House That Dripped Blood (1971) – Waxworks Proprietor (segment 2 "Waxworks")
- The Mackintosh Man (1973) – Malta Police Commissioner
- The Adventure of Sherlock Holmes' Smarter Brother (1975) – Frenchman, bidding for Redcliffe Document
- The Message (1976) – Bu-Lahab
- The Famous Five (1978, Episode: "Five go to Demon Rocks") – Ebenezer Loomer
- The London Connection (1979) – Dr. Krause
- Cuba (1979) – General Fulgencio Batista
- Shining Through (1992) – Male Translator
