= Silver Blaze (1977 film) =

- Based on: The Adventure of Silver Blaze by Arthur Conan Doyle
- Written by: Julian Bond
- Directed by: John Davies
- Starring: Christopher Plummer; Thorley Walters
- Countries of origin: United Kingdom; Canada
- Original language: English

Production
- Producer: William Deneen
- Editor: Alex Kirby
- Running time: 30 min

Original release
- Release: 1977

Silver Blaze is a 1977 British/Canadian television film directed by John Davies and starring Christopher Plummer and Thorley Walters. It is based on Arthur Conan Doyle's 1892 short story "The Adventure of Silver Blaze".

== Cast ==
- Christopher Plummer - Sherlock Holmes
- Thorley Walters - Dr. John H. Watson
- Basil Henson - Colonel Ross
- Gary Watson - Inspector Gregory
- Richard Beale - Straker
- Donald Burton - Fitzroy-Simpson

== Production ==
In the late 1970s, Harlech Television and OECA co-produced a series of half-hour television films under the umbrella title of Classics Dark and Dangerous. For the 1977 adaptation of Conan Doyle's The Adventure of Silver Blaze, Canadian actor Christopher Plummer was chosen for the role of Sherlock Holmes and British actor Thorley Walters portrayed Dr. John H. Watson. This was Walters' fourth appearance in the role of Watson, having previously appeared in 1962's Sherlock Holmes and the Deadly Necklace, 1969's The Best House in London and 1975's The Adventure of Sherlock Holmes' Smarter Brother. Plummer would go on to portray Holmes once more in 1979's Murder by Decree.

Plummer's interpretation of Holmes is notable for playing up Holmes' drug addiction. Plummer stated at the time:

And since the subject of drugs is so topical, I decided to stress this part of the detective's life by having the pallid colouring associated with drug addiction.

The film was an ambitious production with locations including the recently reopened Severn Valley Railway (later to be used in the film adaptation of The Seven-Per-Cent Solution). Plummer hoped the film would be successful and spawn a series of Holmes adaptations, telling Photoplay magazine he hoped it would be "the first of a mini-series of six of the best stories which have not been done before". By the time the film finally aired 18 months after production the idea of continuing the series had been shelved.
