= Charles Edward Pogue =

American dramatist

- Born: Charles Edward Pogue Jr. January 18, 1950 (age 76); Cincinnati, Ohio, U.S.
- Other names: Chuck Pogue, Charles Pogue
- Education: Highlands High School
- Alma mater: University of Kentucky
- Occupations: Screenwriter; playwright; actor
- Years active: 1983–present
- Notable work: The Hound of the Baskervilles, Psycho III, The Fly, D.O.A., Dragonheart
- Spouse: Julieanne Beasley (1987–present)
- Website: poguespages.blogspot.ca

Charles Edward Pogue Jr. (born January 18, 1950) is an American screenwriter, playwright and stage actor. He is best known for writing the screenplays of The Hound of the Baskervilles (1983), Psycho III (1986), The Fly (1986) and Dragonheart (1996).

== Early life ==
Pogue was born on January 18, 1950, in Cincinnati, Ohio, the son of Charles Edward Pogue Sr. (1921–1994) and Ruth Elizabeth Hick (1921–2010). He grew up in Fort Thomas, Kentucky, and graduated from Highlands High School in 1968. He earned a degree in theater arts from the University of Kentucky in 1972 where he was active in theatre productions.

== Career ==
Pogue began writing plays and screenplays after moving to Los Angeles, California. He has worked in the science fiction, fantasy, horror, and thriller genres, and he has also scripted several Sherlock Holmes adaptations: The Hound of the Baskervilles, The Sign of Four, and Hands of a Murderer. His most well-known work to date is probably the acclaimed 1986 remake of The Fly; he provided the initial drafts, though his work was heavily rewritten by David Cronenberg, the film's director.

He has expressed his disappointment with the films that were made from his screenplays for Dragonheart and Kull the Conqueror, saying that they were ruined by studio interference. He has stated that he believes that his most satisfying achievement was The Hound of the Baskervilles.

Pogue is also a renowned actor in regional theater who has worked onstage with such stars as Charlton Heston, Jeremy Brett, Cyd Charisse, Martha Raye and Deanna Dunagan.

From 1997 to 2001, Pogue served on the board of directors of the Writers Guild of America, West.

Pogue and his wife Julieanne Beasley reside in Georgetown, Kentucky. They are both active in theatre productions and he frequently works with the Actors Guild of Lexington in Lexington, Kentucky.

== Filmography ==
Year	Title	Director	Notes
1983	The Hound of the Baskervilles	Douglas Hickox	TV movie
1983	The Sign of Four	Desmond Davis	TV movie
1986	Psycho III	Anthony Perkins	
1986	The Fly	David Cronenberg	
1988	D.O.A.	Rocky Morton and Annabel Jankel	
1990	Hands of a Murderer	Stuart Orme	TV movie
1996	Dragonheart	Rob Cohen	
1997	Kull the Conqueror	John Nicolella	
2005	Hercules	Roger Young	TV movie

== Plays ==
- Whoddunit, Darling? (1983)
- The Ebony Ape (1987)
- Tartuffe (2007)

== Novels ==
- Dragonheart (1996; based on his original screenplay)
