= Thorley Walters =

British actor (1913–1991)

- Born: Thorley Swinstead Walters; 12 May 1913; Teigngrace, Devon, England
- Died: 6 July 1991 (aged 78); London, England
- Resting place: Golders Green Crematorium
- Occupation: Actor
- Years active: 1935–1991

Thorley Swinstead Walters (12 May 1913 – 6 July 1991) was an English actor. He played comedy roles in films including Carlton-Browne of the F.O. (1959) and Two-Way Stretch (1960).

== Early life ==
Walters was born in Teigngrace, Devon, the son of Prebendary Thomas Collins Walters of Silverton, Devon and his wife Mary Francis née Swinstead. He was educated at Monkton Combe School, Somerset.

Walters appeared in the West End in the 1942 naval play Escort by Patrick Hastings and the 1949 musical Her Excellency at the London Hippodrome.

== Career ==
=== Films ===
Walters featured in three of the St Trinian's films, starting as an army major in Blue Murder at St Trinian's. He later appeared as Butters, assistant to Education Ministry senior civil servant Culpepper-Brown (Eric Barker) in The Pure Hell of St Trinian's and played the part of Culpepper-Brown in The Wildcats of St Trinian's.

From the 1960s onwards Walters also appeared in several Hammer horror films, including The Phantom of the Opera (1962), Dracula: Prince of Darkness (1966), Frankenstein Created Woman (1967), Frankenstein Must Be Destroyed (1969) and Vampire Circus (1972). He was a close friend of Hammer's most important director Terence Fisher.

Walters played Sherlock Holmes's sidekick Doctor Watson in four unrelated films: Sherlock Holmes and the Deadly Necklace (1962), The Best House in London (1969), The Adventure of Sherlock Holmes' Smarter Brother (1975) and Silver Blaze (1977).

=== Television ===
Walters' television appearances included the Granada series Crown Court, both as a judge and as a barrister. He also appeared as a barrister in the BBC Series A P Herbert's Misleading Cases, starring Roy Dotrice as Albert Haddock. He also was in The Avengers starring as Hemming in the 1966 episode "What the Butler Saw". Walters also had roles in The Lotus Eaters and Tinker Tailor Soldier Spy. Walters was considered for the role of Captain Mainwaring in Dad's Army, before the part was assigned to Arthur Lowe – Walters was offered the role by producer David Croft but turned it down. In 1974 he played the Prince of Wales in the TV drama Jennie - Lady Randolph Churchill.

== Personal life ==
In the DVD commentary to The Man Who Haunted Himself, actor Roger Moore mentioned that co-star Walters lived in Dolphin Square in Pimlico, London in which some scenes of the film were shot.

Walters visited the ailing Terry-Thomas in Barnes, London in 1989. Walters had starred with Thomas in the Boulting Brothers' film Carlton-Browne of the F.O. and was shocked at his appearance (he was ill with Parkinson's disease). That visit resulted in the Terry-Thomas Gala held in the Theatre Royal, Drury Lane in the same year which raised funds to help Thomas live the rest of his life in comfort.

Actress Siobhan Redmond was visiting Walters when he died in a London nursing home. Actor Ian Bannen gave the main address at his funeral held at Golders Green.

== Filmography ==
- The Love Test (1935) - Chemist
- Once in a New Moon (1935)
- Life of St. Paul (1938) - Unidentified role
- Trunk Crime (1939) - Huey Frazer
- Secret Journey (1939) – Max von Reimer
- It Happened to One Man (1940) – Ronnie
- Medal for the General (1944) – Andrew
- They Were Sisters (1945) – Channing
- Waltz Time (1945) – Stefan Ravenne
- Captain Boycott (1947) – Army Officer (uncredited)
- Josephine and Men (1955) – Salesman
- Private's Progress (1956) – Captain Bootle
- Who Done It? (1956) – Raymond Courtney
- The Baby and the Battleship (1956) – Lt. Setley
- You Can't Escape (1956) – Chadwick
- The Passionate Stranger (1957) – Jimmy
- Second Fiddle (1957) – Charles
- The Truth About Women (1957) – Trevor
- The Birthday Present (1957) – Photographer
- Blue Murder at St Trinian's (1957) – Major
- Happy Is the Bride (1958) – Jim
- A Lady Mislaid (1958) – Smith
- Carlton-Browne of the F.O. (1959) – Colonel Bellingham of the Bays
- Don't Panic Chaps! (1959) – Brown
- Two-Way Stretch (1960) – Col. Parkright
- A French Mistress (1960) – Colonel Edmonds – Chairman of the Governors
- Suspect (1960) – Special Agent Prince
- The Pure Hell of St Trinian's (1960) – Butters
- Invasion Quartet (1961) – Cummings
- Murder, She Said (1961) – Cedric
- Petticoat Pirates (1961) – Captain Jerome Robertson
- The Phantom of the Opera (1962) – Lattimer
- Sherlock Holmes and the Deadly Necklace (1962) – Dr. Watson
- Heavens Above! (1963) – Tranquilax Executive
- Ring of Spies (1964) – Cmdr. Winters
- The Earth Dies Screaming (1964) – Edgar Otis
- Joey Boy (1965) – Col. Grant
- A Home of Your Own (1965) – Estate agent
- Rotten to the Core (1965) – Chief Constable Preston
- Dracula: Prince of Darkness (1966) – Ludwig
- The Psychopath (1966) – Martin Roth
- The Wrong Box (1966) – Lawyer Patience
- The Family Way (1966) – The Vicar
- Frankenstein Created Woman (1967) – Doctor Hertz
- Twisted Nerve (1968) – Sir John Forrester
- Crooks and Coronets (1969) – Hubbard
- Oh! What a Lovely War (1969) – Staff Officer in Ballroom
- The Last Shot You Hear (1969) – Gen. Jowett
- Frankenstein Must Be Destroyed (1969) – Inspector Frisch
- The Best House in London (1969) – Doctor Watson (uncredited)
- The Man Who Haunted Himself (1970) – Frank Bellamy
- Trog (1970) – Magistrate
- Bartleby (1970) – The Colleague
- There's a Girl in My Soup (1970) – Manager, Carlton Hotel
- Mr. Forbush and the Penguins (1971) – Mr. Forbush Sr.
- The Lotus Eaters (1972) – Major Edward Woolley
- Vampire Circus (1972) – Burgermeister
- Young Winston (1972) – Major Finn
- The Edwardians (1972) - King Edward VII
- Soft Beds, Hard Battles (1974) – General Erhardt
- The Gathering Storm (1974) – Stanley Baldwin
- The Adventure of Sherlock Holmes' Smarter Brother (1975) – Dr. Watson
- The People That Time Forgot (1977) – Norfolk
- The Wildcats of St Trinian's (1980) – Hugo Culpepper Brown
- The Sign of Four (1983) – Major John Sholto
- The Little Drummer Girl (1984) – Ned Quilley
- The Play on One: The Dunroamin' Rising (1988) – Mr Finister
