= Non-Combatant Corps =

- Active: 1916–1920; 1940–1963
- Allegiance: United Kingdom
- Branch: British Army
- Role: Non-combatant support in the army (logistics, supply, engineering)
- Size: 14 companies (Second World War)
- Engagements: First World War; Second World War; Post-Second World War

The Non-Combatant Corps (NCC) was a corps of the British Army composed of conscientious objectors as privates, with NCOs and officers seconded from other corps or regiments. Its members fulfilled various non-combatant roles in the army during the First World War, the Second World War and the period of conscription after the Second World War.

== First World War ==
The Non-Combatant Corps (NCC) was first established by royal warrant in March 1916 as a result of the Military Service Act 1916, which introduced conscription in Britain for the first time. The British Army, which had no precedents or guidelines for conscription, formed the corps to provide a military unit for a category of conscientious objectors who had been conscripted but were prepared to accept only non-combatant duties, which was guaranteed in the case of the NCC. It was commanded by regular army officers and NCOs, and its members wore army uniform and were subject to army discipline, but did not carry weapons or participate in battle. Their duties were mainly to provide physical labour (building, cleaning, loading and unloading anything except munitions) for the rest of the army, both in the British Isles and overseas. Conscientious objectors who were directed to the NCC but refused to serve were court martialled and imprisoned. Approximately 3,400 registered conscientious objectors accepted call-up into the NCC.

In a House of Commons debate on 13 August 1919, Winston Churchill, Secretary of State for War, stated that with respect to the Army, the members of the NCC "must be regarded as soldiers, and not as conscientious objectors", as it was "entirely composed of men whose conscience permits them to serve as British soldiers, though it does not permit them to take human life". The NCC received lower pay than most other soldiers, and were generally held in lower esteem by British society. The Corps was disparagingly referred to as the 'No-Courage Corps' by some sections of the British press, and as the 'Pick and Shovel Brigade' by The Times newspaper. The NCC's establishment was opposed by the pacifist No-Conscription Fellowship. The Corps were refused the January 1919 army pay increase, and they were denied any final gratuity. The NCC was demobilised more slowly than combatants and it was not finally disbanded until January 1920.

== Second World War ==
The NCC was re-formed during August 1940, just over a year after conscription was reintroduced. The corps was composed of conscripted men who had been registered as non-combatants by tribunals. Unlike in the First World War, there were also enlisted members of the NCC who had been deemed not physically competent for combatant service. This gave the Corps less of a stigma than it had had twenty five years earlier. It was divided into 14 companies, commanded mostly by veteran officers of the First World War and reservists. During the course of the war 6,766 men served in the NCC, of whom 465 volunteered to specialise in bomb disposal, on attachment to the Royal Engineers but remaining in the NCC. In 1944–45 some volunteered for transfer to the Royal Army Medical Corps, while retaining their non-combatant status, to join Parachute Field Ambulance units dropped over France on and after D-Day. Others worked in army stores, transport, agriculture, forestry, or on other projects 'not involving the handling of military material of an aggressive nature'. As in the First World War the NCC was part of the army, not a civilian unit. During the war some members of the NCC renounced their conscientious objector status to serve in combat roles, sometimes as examples of German war crimes came to public attention, just as some men who had originally accepted call-up into the ordinary armed forces changed their minds and claimed conscientious objection.

The Corps was disbanded for a second time when, in 1963, conscription ended.

== In popular culture ==
In the fictional television series Danger UXB, Private John Brinckley, a Quaker, is a member of the NCC in the Second World War. Assigned to Lieutenant Brian Ash's 347 Section of 97 Tunnelling Company, Brinckley reconsiders his objections to war and requests reassignment to the Royal Engineers. He is later sent to Officers Candidate School, is commissioned, and is trained as a bomb disposal officer. The storyline derives from an actual NCC member who took that path.
