= Sherlock Holmes and the Deadly Necklace =

1962 film by Terence Fisher

- French film poster
- German: Sherlock Holmes und das Halsband des Todes
- Directed by: Terence Fisher
- Screenplay by: Curt Siodmak
- Based on: Characters by Arthur Conan Doyle
- Produced by: Artur Brauner
- Starring: Christopher Lee; Senta Berger; Hans Söhnker; Hans Nielsen; Ivan Desny; Leon Askin; Wolfgang Lukschy; Edith Schultze-Westrum; Thorley Walters
- Cinematography: Richard Angst
- Edited by: Ira Oberberg
- Music by: Martin Slavin
- Production companies: CCC Filmkunst; Critérion Films; Incei Film
- Distributed by: Constantin Film
- Release dates: 30 November 1962 (West Germany); 3 May 1963 (Italy); 20 May 1964 (France)
- Running time: 87 minutes
- Countries: West Germany; France; Italy
- Box office: 198,324 admissions (France)

Sherlock Holmes and the Deadly Necklace (German: Sherlock Holmes und das Halsband des Todes) is a 1962 mystery film directed by Terence Fisher and written by Curt Siodmak, based on the characters Sherlock Holmes and Dr. Watson created by Arthur Conan Doyle. It stars Christopher Lee as Holmes and Thorley Walters as Watson, along with Senta Berger, Hans Söhnker, Hans Nielsen, and Ivan Desny.

Though the film had a British director and lead actors, it was a West German-French-Italian co-production led by Artur Brauner's CCC Filmkunst. It was released in West Germany by Constantin Film on November 30, 1962, and received mixed reviews.

== Plot ==
The film's plot has Sherlock Holmes and Dr. Watson attempting to recover a stolen necklace, formerly worn by Cleopatra, from Professor Moriarty. Holmes tries to convince the police that the professor is a criminal, but his pleadings fall on deaf ears.

== Cast ==
- Christopher Lee as Sherlock Holmes
- Thorley Walters as Dr. Watson
- Senta Berger as Ellen Blackburn
- Hans Söhnker as Prof. Moriarty
- Hans Nielsen as Inspector Cooper
- Ivan Desny as Paul King
- Leon Askin as Charles, the chauffeur
- Wolfgang Lukschy as Peter Blackburn
- Edith Schultze-Westrum as Mrs. Hudson
- Bernard Lajarrige as Inspector French
- Heinrich Gies as the Texan
- Linda Sini as Prostitute
- Roland Armontel as Doctor
- Max Strassberg as Johnny
- Rena Horten as Emily Kellner

== Production ==
One-time Universal screenwriter Curt Siodmak (The Wolf Man) wrote the screenplay, based on the characters created by Sir Arthur Conan Doyle. The film was intended to be an adaptation of Doyle's final Holmes novel, The Valley of Fear, but only minor elements of this story remained.

West German producer Artur Brauner originally conceived the film as the first of a German film series. The producers' contact with the Arthur Conan Doyle estate led to the estate vetoing their original schemes to set the film in the present day such as the Edgar Wallace German film series and have Dr. Watson played by German comedian Heinz Erhardt. Many scenes of the film had to be reshot due to the Doyle estate not approving the dailies. Director Terence Fisher wrote memos to Brauner complaining the film was too static and not cinematic enough, leading to many rewrites by various uncredited screenwriters.

Filming took place in July and August 1962 in Dublin, Ireland and Berlin, with some exterior location shooting in London. Interiors were shot at Spandau Studios. The scenes at Moriarty's house were filmed at Glienicke Palace. To ease the process of dubbing the film into multiple languages, the film was shot without sync sound, a common practice in continental Europe at the time.

Christopher Lee donned a false nose to play the famous detective for the first time. For unknown reasons, Lee and the rest of the cast were dubbed. Although Sherlock Holmes and the Deadly Necklace was originally filmed in English, the English language audio track was recorded post-production by different actors, mainly American, with Mid-Atlantic accents. Lee was dubbed by actor William Kiehl, who also dubbed him in Hercules in the Haunted World (1961) and The Whip and the Body (1963). In the German-language version, Lee was dubbed by Harry Wüstenhagen, who was the German voice of Holmes in several other productions including A Study in Terror (John Neville) and The Seven-Per-Cent Solution (Nicol Williamson).

The film has a jazz score by Martin Slavin.

== Release ==
The film's German premiere was on 30 November 1962. The Italian version was released on 3 May 1963 and the French one (Sherlock Holmes et le collier de la mort) on 20 May 1964. Sherlock Holmes and the Deadly Necklace was not released to theatres in the United Kingdom until March 1968, and it went directly to television in the United States.

=== Home media ===
Retromedia Entertainment released Sherlock Holmes and the Deadly Necklace on DVD in 2005. In 2006, Alpha Video released a double feature DVD including Sherlock Holmes and the Deadly Necklace and the 1931 film The Speckled Band, starring Raymond Massey. In 2021 the film was released on Blu-ray by Severin Films in the collection "The Eurocrypt of Christopher Lee".

== Reception ==
Segnalazione Cinematografiche criticised the film for reducing the tale to banalities and for being a sloppy adaptation with modest performances by director and actors. However, the German Lexikon des internationalen Films called it "an amusing detective game" set at the turn of the century that came quite close to recreating "the strange attraction" of Conan Doyle's Holmes adventures.

The Monthly Film Bulletin said of the film that "apart from some startling anachronisms the period detail was on the whole nicely done", but Marjorie Bilbow of Cinema and T.V. Today said, "As a story woven around an unknown detective it would have been forgiveable, but classic characters demand more accurate handling than this." A more recent review from George R. Reis of DVDdrive-in.com called the film "an enjoyable little mystery" and Lee "a wonderful Holmes".

Charles Prepolec of the Holmes fan website BakerStreetDozen.com wrote, "There are some amusingly broad characters that add an element of humour, including a sadly Nigel Bruce-like performance from Thorley Walters. Comedic turns abound in a pub sequence with Holmes in his thug disguise. There are some well played scenes between Lee and Hans Söhnker, played out on a bench that echo the fantastic exchange between Holmes and Moriarty recorded in The Final Problem. Great stuff, but unfortunately not frequent enough in this film."

=== Creators' response ===
Fisher and Lee were not happy with the film. Fisher called it "a film well worth left alone" and Lee said of it "I think it was a pity, this film, in more ways than one. We should never have made it in Germany with German actors, although we had a British art director and a British director. It was a hodge podge of stories put together by the German producers, who ruined it. My portrayal of Holmes is, I think, one of the best things I've ever done because I tried to play him really as he was written, as a very intolerant, argumentative, difficult man, and I looked extraordinarily like him with the make-up. Everyone who has seen it said I was as like Holmes as any actor they have ever seen both in appearance and interpretation."

== Legacy ==
Christopher Lee went on to reprise his role as Holmes in two made-for-television films in the 1990s, Sherlock Holmes and the Leading Lady (1991) and Incident at Victoria Falls (1992), featuring Patrick Macnee as Watson.

Thorley Walters played Watson in three other productions, The Best House in London (1969, with Peter Jeffrey as Holmes), The Adventure of Sherlock Holmes' Smarter Brother (1975, with Douglas Wilmer), and the made-for-television Silver Blaze (1977, with Christopher Plummer).
