= Aubrey Morris =

British actor (1926–2015)

- in The Prisoner episode: Dance of the Dead (1967)
- Born: Aubrey Steinberg; 1 June 1926; Portsmouth, Hampshire, England
- Died: 15 July 2015 (aged 89); Los Angeles, California, U.S.
- Occupation: Actor
- Years active: 1948–2015
- Parent(s): Morry Steinberg; Becky Steinberg
- Relatives: Wolfe Morris (brother)

Aubrey Morris (born Aubrey Steinberg; 1 June 1926 – 15 July 2015) was a British actor known for his appearances in the films A Clockwork Orange and The Wicker Man.

== Early life and career ==
Morris was one of nine children born to Becky (née Levine) and Morry Steinberg. An elder brother, Wolfe Morris, was also an accomplished actor. His Jewish grandparents were from Kyiv and escaped the Russian pogroms, arriving in London in about 1890. The family moved to Portsmouth at the turn of the 20th century. Aubrey attended Portsmouth Municipal College and RADA. His first stage appearance in 1944 was at the Open Air Theatre, Regent's Park in The Winter's Tale. From 1954 to 1956 he was at The Old Vic and appeared on Broadway.

== Film and television ==
Morris featured in over fifty films; a notable early role was as Thorburn, the oddball pornographer running a Soho bookshop in John Gilling's science fiction thriller The Night Caller (1965). His better known films include Stanley Kubrick's A Clockwork Orange (1971), Woody Allen's Love and Death (1975), Ken Russell's Lisztomania (1975), and Gene Wilder's The Adventure of Sherlock Holmes' Smarter Brother (1977).

He also appeared in many television programmes, his debut being in a BBC production of the comedy Fly Away Peter (1948). Television appearances include The Champions (1968), as Van Velden in episode 2, "The Invisible Man". Although most of his television appearances were in Britain, such as Z-Cars and Lovejoy, he also made some appearances in US productions, such as the Columbo television movie Ashes to Ashes (1998) and the Dennis Miller horror film Bordello of Blood (1996).

== Film ==
- The Quare Fellow (1962) – Silvertop
- The Night Caller (1965) – Thorburn
- The Great St Trinian's Train Robbery (1966) – Hutch
- The Sandwich Man (1966) – Cedric, the escapologist
- Up the Junction (1968) – Creely, an estate agent
- If It's Tuesday, This Must Be Belgium (1969) – Harry Dix
- A Clockwork Orange (1971) – P. R. Deltoid
- Blood from the Mummy's Tomb (1971) – Doctor Putnam
- Go for a Take (1972) – Director
- The Wicker Man (1973) – Gravedigger/gardener
- Man About the House (1974) – Lecturer
- Love and Death (1975) – Soldier
- Lisztomania (1975) – Manager
- The Adventure of Sherlock Holmes' Smarter Brother (1977) – Coach Driver
- S.O.S. Titanic (1979) – Steward John Hart
- Oxford Blues (1984) – Doctor Quentin Boggs
- The Zany Adventures of Robin Hood (1984) – Archbishop
- Lifeforce (1985) – Sir Percy Heseltine
- The Rachel Papers (1989) – Sir Herbert
- My Girl 2 (1994) – Alfred Beidermeyer
- The Goal Movie (1995) – Dr. Jonah
- Bordello of Blood (1996) – McCutcheon
- Bram Stoker's Legend of the Mummy (1998) – Dr. Winchester
- Visioneers (2008) – Old Jeffers

== Television ==
- Catweazle – Leslie Milton, a theatrical items shop owner
- City Beneath the Sea (1962) – Professor Ludwig Ziebrecken, a meglomaniac who sees himself as the leader of a 'New World Order'
- 1981 BBC TV adaptation of The Hitchhiker's Guide to the Galaxy – the dimwitted Golgafrinchan captain who was eternally taking a bath
- Tales from the Crypt (1990) Season 2, Episode 4 "'Til Death" as Freddy
- Reilly, Ace of Spies – Mendrovovich
- Ripping Yarns Episode 6 – Grosvenor, the butler who likes 'the naughty books'
- The Prisoner, episode 8: Dance of the Dead – Town crier
- The Saint – Pebbles
- Thorndyke (1964) – Julius Wicks
- The Avengers – Quince in episode 'Silent Dust' (1965)
- Babylon 5 – Duncan (in "Exogenesis")
- Danger Man – 3 episodes; portraying Mr. Harris in 'Yesterday's Enemies', Fortunato Santos in one episode, Tamasio in 'The Paper Chase'
- The Sweeney – Foreign Gambler, episode: 'Stoppo Driver', his brother Wolfe Morris also appeared in the same episode.
- Space: 1999, episode: Mission of the Darians – Petros High Priest
- Armchair Theatre – 6 episodes, including Joe, the make-up man in "Afternoon of a Nymph" (1962)
- ‘’Ashes to Ashes (Columbo)’’ 1998 - Fred
- Deadwood – Chesterton
- On the Buses – Marriage guidance counsellor
- It's Always Sunny in Philadelphia – Albert Zimmerman
- Pardon The Expression – Mr. Blenkinsop, 'The Cup That Cheers' (1966)
