= Danger UXB =

1979 British TV drama series

- Created by: John Hawkesworth and John Whitney
- Based on: stories by Major A. B. Hartley
- Starring: Anthony Andrews; Judy Geeson; Maurice Roëves; Iain Cuthbertson; Jeremy Sinden
- Composer: Simon Park
- Country of origin: United Kingdom
- Original language: English
- No. of series: 1
- No. of episodes: 13

Production
- Producer: John Hawkesworth
- Cinematography: Norman Langley; Tony Mander; Peter Jessop; Ian Wilson
- Running time: 49-51 minutes
- Production company: Euston Films for Thames

Original release
- Network: ITV
- Release: 8 January – 2 April 1979

Danger UXB is a 1979 British ITV television series set during the Second World War. It was developed by John Hawkesworth and starred Anthony Andrews as Lieutenant Brian Ash, an officer in the Royal Engineers (RE).

The series chronicles the exploits of the fictional 97 Tunnelling Company, (Note: The tunnelling companies of the Royal Engineers in World War I were numbered 170–185 and 250–258. Seven of them (170–173 and 178–180), were revived in 1939–1940, serving on Malta and Gibraltar, but not in bomb disposal.) which has been made a bomb disposal unit, and specifically 347 Section of the company, to deal with the thousands of unexploded bombs ("UXBs") in London during the Blitz. As with all his fellow officers, Ash must for the most part learn the techniques and procedures of disarming and destroying the UXBs through experience, repeatedly confronted with more cunning and deadlier technological advances in aerial bomb fuzing. The series primarily features military storylines, though among them is a romantic thread featuring an inventor's married daughter, Susan Mount (Judy Geeson), with whom Ash falls in love, and other human interest vignettes.

The programme was partly based on Unexploded Bomb - The Story of Bomb Disposal, the memoirs of Major A. B. Hartley and episodes were written by Hawkesworth and four screenwriters. The series was filmed in 1978 in and around the Clapham, Streatham and Tooting areas of south London. Lt. Col. E. E. Gooch was the technical adviser.

The programme appeared on the US PBS as a segment of Masterpiece Theatre from 4 January to 5 April 1981. It was also screened in Australia by the public broadcaster ABC Television, and in New Zealand by Television New Zealand.

== Cast ==
347 Section, 97 Company

- Anthony Andrews as Lieutenant Brian Ash, section bomb disposal officer
- Maurice Roëves as Sergeant James, section sergeant
- Ken Kitson as Corporal Samuel Horrocks, a large but timid section NCO
- Kenneth Cranham as Lance Corporal Jack Salt, a married man anxious about the safety of his wife and children
- George Innes as Sapper (later Lance Corporal) Jim Wilkins, section driver, a conniving petty thief and scrounger who avoids work as much as he can
- Gordon Kane as Sapper Gordon Mulley, also Ash's batman. He falls in love with the landlady's daughter.
- Robert Pugh as Sapper 'Tiny' Powell, a coarse and often bullying Welshman who plays the piano
- Robert Longden as Sapper Copping, a religious and contemplative young man
- David Auker as Sapper Baines, later transferred to the Eighth Army in North Africa
- Martin Neil as Private John Brinckley, a replacement from the Non-Combatant Corps later commissioned into the Royal Engineers as a bomb disposal officer
- John Bowler as Sapper Scott, a replacement
- Bryan Burdon as Sapper Binns, a replacement who in peacetime was a stage actor and comedian

97 Company, Royal Engineers

- Peter Cartwright as Major Luckhurst, officer commanding
- Ken Farrington as Captain 'Fannie' Francis, second-in-command (2IC) and later officer commanding
- Royston Tickner as Lieutenant (later Captain) Hamish Leckie, company adjutant and Scottish veteran of the First World War
- Jeremy Sinden as Lieutenant (later Major) Ivor Rodgers, Ash's good friend, later 2IC and officer commanding
- Steven Grives as Lieutenant Ken Machin, a replacement bomb disposal officer
- Osmund Bullock as Lieutenant (later Captain) Alan Pringle, section officer and later 2IC
- David Shaughnessy as 2nd Lieutenant Tim Carter-Brown, section officer
- Nick Brimble as Lieutenant Gresham, section officer and junior officer in the company
- Norman Chappell as Corporal Mould, mess corporal, who is constantly teased by Ivor Rodgers

Others

- Iain Cuthbertson as Doctor Gillespie, a boffin specialising in defeating German bomb fuses
- Judy Geeson as Susan Mount, Gillespie's married daughter and Brian Ash's paramour
- David Buck as Stephen Mount, Susan's codebreaker husband
- Moyra Fraser as Aunt Do-Do, Brian's surrogate mother
- Marjie Lawrence as Mrs Baker, landlady of Brian's billet
- Deborah Watling as Norma, Mrs Baker's daughter and Sapper Mulley's paramour
- David Wood as Lieutenant Roger Symes, 81 Company RE section officer
- Christopher Good as Captain West, RE
- Nick Tate as Lieutenant Chris Craik, Royal Navy, a bomb disposal officer specialising in naval mines
- Tim Pigott-Smith as Harry Winthrop, Dr Gillespie's associate at Cambridge
- Deborah Grant as Elspeth, Brian's paramour while stationed at Cambridge
- Geraldine Gardner as Mickey, a cabaret dancer who is attracted to Lance Corporal Salt

== Episodes ==
The series was first broadcast between 8 January and 2 April 1979 on Monday nights at 21:00.

No.	Title	Directed by	Written by	Original release date
1	"Dead Man's Shoes"	Ferdinand Fairfax	John Hawkesworth	8 January 1979
(September 1940) Brian Ash, a direct entry officer of the Royal Engineers after ten weeks of basic training at the Hampshire Depot, joins 97 Tunnelling Company. (Note: The conversion of a tunnelling company was a fictional plot device. The RE had been authorised 134 bomb disposal sections by July 1940 and 220 by August. The Blitz caused a hasty reorganisation into companies, of which 25 were authorised, all designated "Bomb Disposal Companies". The basis in fact for 97 Coy's "conversion" may have been the change during planning of 11 companies originally allocated to be "general construction" or "quarrying" units to allocation under the new bomb disposal classification, but all BD companies were raised as such. By January 1941 six companies worked in the London area: 2 BD Coy at Balham, 5 BD Coy at Acton, 15 BD Coy at Mill Hill, 21 BD Coy at South Woodford, 24 BD Coy at Chiswick and 25 BD Coy at Eltham. (Wakeling)) Without benefit of training as a bomb disposal officer, he is immediately put in charge of a section whose previous officer was killed by a bomb. The unexploded bombs they deal with have been armed by electrical fuses that activate after being dropped, but sometimes fail to go off on impact. If they fail to explode on impact, they can detonate when vibrations caused by movement or contact close the circuit. Under the tutelage of Sergeant James, he defuses a relatively straightforward type 15 fused bomb, but is dismayed to learn that the Germans have deployed an even deadlier fuse, the type 17, that is rigged with a clockwork long-delay detonator activated by the bomb's impact.
2	"Unsung Heroes"	Ferdinand Fairfax	John Hawkesworth	15 January 1979
(September 1940) Brian is reprimanded, first by Captain Francis for a newspaper story about the section that the 2IC believes injures the dignity of the service, then by Major Luckhurst for his reckless behaviour when defuzing a low-priority bomb. Brian becomes acquainted with a new officer, Ken Machin, who is assigned to his tutelage and billeted with him. Ken introduces Brian to his wife. Brian and Ken find they are to be sent on a hastily developed new course on bomb disposal.
3	"Just Like a Woman"	Roy Ward Baker	Jeremy Paul	22 January 1979
(September 1940) On their course, they learn that the boffins have developed a powerful electromagnetic "clockstopper" to counter the type 17's fuse. Brian gives in to Machin's pleadings and allows him to finish disarming the type 17 discovered in a residential garden while Brian goes to deal with a Category A (highest priority) bomb near a telephone exchange. While he is gone, the type 17 explodes, killing Machin despite the use of the clockstopper. He later learns that Machin had only just got engaged to his fiancée and that she is pregnant. He later finds the Category A bomb has ruptured without exploding, and has an intact type 17 fuse. Brian learns that the type 17 is also rigged with an anti-handling device called the Zeus 40 (Note: The term is an acronym verbalisation of the designation 'ZÜS 40' (Zünder Sperre 40) stamped on the device.) that detonates if there is an attempt to extract the fuse.
4	"Cast Iron Killer"	Jeremy Summers	Don Shaw	29 January 1979
(September 1940) A sceptical Brian is ordered to deliver a defused but otherwise intact bomb to Dr. Gillespie, a boffin in Kent who has come up with a novel solution to bypassing the Zeus 40: drilling a hole in the bomb casing and piping in steam to emulsify the explosive so it flows out of the casing for removal. Brian initially clashes with Gillespie's married daughter Susan, but the two come to respect each other after Brian is assigned to assist Gillespie. During its first field trial, on a bomb with a tricky double fuse mechanism the new method works in removing the bulk of the explosive and rendering the bomb safe, but Sapper Copping is killed by the fuse charge when the timer is restarted by the vibrations from a passing tube train and it detonates.
5	"The Silver Lining"	Henry Herbert	John Hawkesworth	5 February 1979
(September 1940) The section digs for a huge bomb in the sewers beneath a risqué nightclub. Entertained by Mickey, a dancer stranded at the club, and by Copping's replacement, Sapper Baines, the section eats and drinks the club's wares and is in no hurry to find the bomb. Mickey and Lance Corporal Salt begin a casual affair. Later, the section's rankers assist Salt in smuggling Mickey clear of the nightclub, where (due to the UXB) civilians are not supposed to be. After the bomb is located, Brian discovers that it is equipped with the new type 50, a hypersensitive fuse designed to detonate when the usual defuzing procedures are employed. The boffins have just developed a counter-tactic, however, and Brian is the first to try it: the BD liquid discharger, which forces a mixture of alcohol, benzene and salt into the fuse that causes the capacitors in the fuse to discharge their stored electricity harmlessly, thus neutralising the fuse . When Susan comes up to London, Brian takes her out for a night of dining and dancing. As a thank-you for preserving his stock, the silversmith next door to the nightclub presents a small loving cup to 347 Section.
6	"The Quiet Weekend"	Roy Ward Baker	Jeremy Paul	12 February 1979
(October 1940) 347 section is given a much-needed weekend off duty. Brian's plans to sleep are drastically changed when Susan seeks him out, and they stay together in a drab hotel in Bromley using assumed names. However, Brian is called back to work, cutting short their tryst, when Luckhurst sends him to assist 81 Company, which is hard-pressed by activity and casualties, with two bombs along a railway line. By the time he arrives, one of the bombs has exploded, killing half of an 81 Company section and emotionally crippling its officer. Brian successfully deals with the other bomb, which is double-fused with both a ticking type 17 and an active type 50. Susan grows impatient waiting for him and returns home to find an unexpected visitor: her husband Stephen.
7	"Digging Out"	Ferdinand Fairfax	Paul Wheeler	19 February 1979
(December 1940) While the section works on a bomb at a gas works, Lance Corporal Salt wanders off, hears cries for help, and finds a young woman trapped beside a second bomb with a time fuse . Without Brian's knowledge or permission, Salt and several other men take a great risk and manhandle the bomb into the Thames mudflats just before it explodes. Later, unable to get leave, Salt goes absent without leave (AWOL), to try to persuade his wife to leave Manchester with their children, but a German bomb dropped during a single-plane daylight raid kills her and injures him. When Salt recovers, he is demoted to sapper and fined two days' pay. Captain Francis is resentful that Salt's punishment is minor, but Luckhurst informs him that since he will shortly be taking command of 97 Company, as Luckhurst has been promoted, he should consider being more humane in enforcing regulations in a high-risk unit during wartime.
8	"Bad Company"	Ferdinand Fairfax	Don Shaw	26 February 1979
(May 1941) Major Francis' heavy-handed measures to impose peacetime discipline and regimental customs on 97 Company cause widespread resentment, leading to near-mutiny. He is particularly harsh with Brian's section after his men commit minor breaches of discipline, but for a more personal reason: Brian's affair with a married woman reminds him of his own wife's ongoing infidelity. When Francis is seen secretly burning letters commending Ash that he pilfered from the company files, Susan reconstructs the file and gets her father to use his influence to have Francis posted to a general construction company in Scotland. Captain Ivor Rodgers, 97 Company's second-in-command, is promoted to major and takes command of 97 Company. His first act is to recommend Brian for the MBE.
9	"Seventeen Seconds to Glory"	Douglas Camfield	John Hawkesworth	5 March 1979
(December 1941) 347 Section receives two replacements, Sapper Scott and Private Brinckley, the latter a Quaker conscientious objector serving in the Non-Combatant Corps who engenders suspicion from some of the others in the section. Powell picks a fight with Brinckley, but is beaten up by Salt to stop the attack. Salt has no sympathy for Brinckley's pacifist beliefs and advises him to think about the innocents being killed in the war. Brian helps Lieutenant Craik, an Australian serving in the Royal Navy, defuse a parachute mine designed to detonate just seventeen seconds after its timer mechanism starts. (Note: Craik's story is based on that of Lieutenants John S. Mould and Hugh R. Syme, Australians who had volunteered for the Royal Navy as bomb disposal officers under identical circumstances. Both Mould and Syme had characters in Danger UXB named after them. (Salmon, pp. 36-37)) Susan is chafing with guilt over their affair, and Brian proposes marriage. However, her husband, a codebreaker at Bletchley Park, has a nervous breakdown. She is advised to look after him, prompting her to break off her relationship with Brian without explanation. Dr. Gillespie takes her to Cambridge, where he has set up a new laboratory.
10	"Butterfly Winter"	Roy Ward Baker	Jeremy Paul	12 March 1979
(December 1942) The Germans attempt to sow confusion and fear in the British countryside by dropping hundreds of food can-sized butterfly bombs on a small village. Some detonate if moved, while others are time-delayed. The bombs end up in all manner of places, and their sheer numbers make it impossible for Brian to deal with them on his own; all of 347 Section, down to the lowest rank, must work to secure and blow them up. Lance-Corporal Salt is killed by one whilst helping yet another woman in distress.
11	"Dead Letter"	Simon Langton	Kenneth Clark	19 March 1979
(January 1943) A year after Brian and Susan have broken up, they have an awkward reunion when her father, Dr Gillespie, asks for Brian to be posted to his lab to determine how to defuse the new German Y fuse . The design uses multiple battery-operated mercury tilt switches to detect any movement of the fuse and close the circuit. The fuse also detonates automatically if a battery is short-circuited; its sole purpose is to kill bomb disposal officers. Gillespie's solution is to freeze the insides of the bomb to -20 °C to render the batteries inert, using liquid oxygen poured into a makeshift plasticine dam on the bomb's casing, a dangerous and time-consuming process. (Note: The episode was based on the actual circumstances involving Major John Hudson, a horticulturalist in the Territorial Army who became a bomb disposal expert. (Budiansky, Hartley, p. 147)) While in Cambridge, Brian has an affair with Elspeth, a woman who has lost the Royal Air Force bomber pilot she loved. The first trial of the Type Y freezing process is for a UXB assigned to 347 Section for disposal, following which Brian learns that Stephen Mount has committed suicide.
12	"The Pier"	Douglas Camfield	Don Shaw	26 March 1979
(September 1943) Brian is posted back to 347 Section, which relocates to Brighton to remove land mines laid in 1940 in anticipation of the German invasion that never came. Susan and Brian become engaged before he leaves. The former Private John Brinckley, Non-Combatant Corps, has joined the Royal Engineers and been commissioned as a bomb disposal officer. He is assigned to Brian for further training and seasoning. 347 Section is assigned a seaside pleasure pier where anti-personnel mines have been hidden under the decking. Ivor Rogers, still in command of 97 Company, instructs Brian to delegate the work (clearly grooming him for command); but when Lieutenant Brinckley is killed by an unmarked mine, Brian must resume clearing the explosives. While attempting to defuse a device installed on the slipway of the lifeboat station, he is badly injured when it goes off and blows him into the water.
13	"With Love From Adolf"	Henry Herbert	John Hawkesworth	2 April 1979
(February 1944) The pregnant Norma Baker and Gordon Mulley prepare to marry. A bomb just misses 347 Section's barracks and Mulley is nearly asphyxiated when he falls into its camouflet. Brian's difficult recovery strains his relationship with Susan near to breaking point as he worries about being invalided out of the service. He refuses to see anyone or attend the wedding until Sergeant James visits him and succeeds in breaking through his depression. Brian is restored to active service but when he is promoted to captain and transferred to what seems a meaningless position in Somerset, he feels useless. Ivor offers him an unofficial chance to defuse a recently discovered and relatively routine bomb dropped years before. Dismantling the fuse, however, Brian finds a note inside that says 'With Love from Adolf.' (Ivor had gone down the night before and left the note in the fuse for Brian to find, to see if he still had what it took to be a bomb disposal officer.) The viewers can infer that instead of going to Somerset, Brian will remain with 97 Company and 347 Section, doing a job at which he is very, very good. The series ends with Captain Ash and Sergeant James blowing up the defused Hermann with a block of plastic explosive.

== Books ==
Hartley's book, a non-fiction memoir of technical information and anecdotes, provided some of the major story developments. Danger UXB, a novel based on the series and written by Michael Booker, was published by Pan Books in 1978, and an annual was published by World Distributors in 1980.

A non-fiction book titled Danger UXB by Melanie Jappy was published in 2001 by Macmillan. It was based on the two-part Channel 4 documentary series Danger Unexploded Bomb (15-22 February 2001), rather than the drama series. However, many of the dramatic incidents shown in the series turn out to be based on actual cases. For example, the incident with one bomb in a schoolyard and another in a garden that cost Ken Machin his life is covered on pages 78 and 79. The liquid-oxygen fire in "Dead Letter" while Ash was defusing the Type Y fuse is covered on pages 152 and 153. Chapter 8 covers the Grimsby Raid of June 13, 1943, which forms the basis for "Butterfly Winter" and includes the development of the string-and-pulley system for moving the SD2s about, the bombs in the bean field, and the inspiration for Sergeant James being blown off the stone wall and breaking his arm. And pages 187 and 188 recount the inspiration for "The Pier" and Brian Ash's serious injuries.

== Production ==
Many of the bomb-disposal scenes were filmed in what appeared to be deep, freshly dug holes lined with wooden shoring (the way real bomb disposal often happened). In fact, these scenes were shot using two different physical sets intercut: a short above-ground wooden fence that appeared to be the top of the shaft down to the bomb (but was not in fact excavated); and a 30-foot above-ground hollow wooden tower with a muddy area inside at the bottom (often shot from above, looking down). A side of the bottom was also removable to facilitate "bottom-of-shaft" close-ups.

== Notes ==
Footnotes

Citations
