= The House in Karp Lane =

1965 film

- DVD cover
- Directed by: Kurt Hoffmann
- Written by: Gerd Angermann; M. Y. Ben-Gavriel (novel)
- Produced by: Heinz Angermeyer
- Starring: Jana Brejchová; Edith Schultze-Westrum; Wolfgang Kieling
- Cinematography: Josef Illík
- Edited by: Dagmar Hirtz
- Music by: Zdeněk Liška
- Production companies: Filmaufbau; Independent Film
- Distributed by: Neue Filmform Heiner Braun
- Release date: 12 March 1965
- Running time: 110 minutes
- Country: West Germany
- Language: German

The House in Karp Lane (German: Das Haus in der Karpfengasse) is a 1965 West German drama film directed by Kurt Hoffmann and starring Jana Brejchová, Edith Schultze-Westrum and Wolfgang Kieling.

It portrays the Jewish residents of a Prague boarding house during the German occupation of Czechoslovakia. While the film received several awards, it was a major commercial failure. Hoffmann then returned to directing the comedies he was better known for.

The film was shot at the Barrandov Studios in Prague, and on location around the city.

== Cast ==
- Jana Brejchová as Božena
- Edith Schultze-Westrum as Alte Kauders
- Wolfgang Kieling as Karl Marek
- František Filipovský as Alter Kauders
- Ladislav Kríz as Emil Kauders
- Rosl Schäfer as Olga Marek
- Helmut Schmid as Leutnant Slezak
- Walter Taub as Salomon Laufer
- Hana Vítová as Mali Laufer
- Peter Herrmann as Ernst Laufer
- Tamara Kafková as Frieda Laufer
- Martin Gregor as Marcel Lederer
- Margrit Weiler as Bertha Lederer
- Walter Buschhoff as Krauthammer
- Jiří Holý as Klossmann
- Rudolf Hrušínský as Karl Glaser
- Karl-Otto Alberty as Leopold Glaser
- Ludmila Pesková as Anna Krummbein
- Václav Voska as Leo Mautner
- Eva Maria Meineke as Lilly Mautner
- Ivan Mistrík as Milan Schramek
- Berno von Cramm as Behrend
- Jan Tříska as Kolowrat
- Libuse Pesková
- Josef Beyvl
- Rudolf Deyl

== Bibliography ==
- Bock, Hans-Michael; Bergfelder, Tim (2009-09-01). The Concise Cinegraph: Encyclopaedia of German Cinema. Berghahn Books. ISBN 978-0-85745-565-9.
