= Edith Schultze-Westrum =

German actress

- Rüdel postcard, 1970s
- Born: 30 December 1904; Mainz-Kastel, German Empire
- Died: 20 March 1981 (aged 76); Munich, West Germany
- Occupation: Actress
- Years active: 1932–1979

Edith Käthe Elisabeth Schultze-Westrum (30 December 1904 – 20 March 1981) was a German film actress. She appeared in more than 60 films between 1932 and 1979. These included the role of Mrs. Hudson in the 1962 film Sherlock Holmes and the Deadly Necklace.

== Selected filmography ==
- Kiki (1932)
- The Time with You (1948) – Fürsorgehelferin
- Tragödie einer Leidenschaft (1949) – Frau Berowska
- Heimliches Rendezvous (1949) – Fräulein Diethof
- Verspieltes Leben (1949) – Elisabeth von Kanzler
- Chased by the Devil (1950) – Schwester Grete
- Das ewige Spiel (1951)
- Captive Soul (1952)
- House of Life (1952) – Josepha Spratt
- The Great Temptation (1952) – Frau Riebold
- Zwerg Nase (1953) – Hexe
- I and You (1953) – Mutter Erdmann
- Love and Trumpets (1954) – Frau von Barro
- Sauerbruch – Das war mein Leben (1954) – Sekretärin (uncredited)
- The Beginning Was Sin (1954) – Mutter der Rosalia
- La Paura (1954)
- The Dark Star (1955) – Frau Lechner
- 08/15 at Home (1955) – Frau Brahm
- Weil du arm bist, mußt du früher sterben (1956)
- Vergiß wenn Du kannst (1956) – Kekki, Lappländerin
- Santa Lucia (1956) – Tante Rosa
- Sand, Love and Salt (1957) – Mother of Piero
- Immer wenn der Tag beginnt (1957) – Frau Kleinschmidt – Hans' Mutter
- Mein Mädchen ist ein Postillion (1958)
- Dorothea Angermann (1959) – Frau Lüders
- Die Brücke (1959) – Mother Bernhard
- Love Now, Pay Later (1959) – Frau Kroll, Putzfrau
- Darkness Fell on Gotenhafen (1960) – Mutter Reiser
- Headquarters State Secret (1960) – Frau Schmitz, Portiersche
- Weit ist der Weg (1960) – Schwester Teresa
- Via Mala (1961) – Mutter Lauretz
- Die Stunde, die du glücklich bist (1961) – Wirtschafterin
- Jeder stirbt für sich allein (1962, TV Movie) – Anna Quangel
- Escape from East Berlin (1962) – Mother Schröder
- Sherlock Holmes and the Deadly Necklace (1962) – Mrs. Hudson
- The Forester's Daughter (1962)
- Ostrva (1963)
- Ein Frauenarzt klagt an (1964) – Mutter Hartmann
- Praetorius (1965) – (uncredited)
- The House in Karp Lane (1965) – Alte Kauders
- All People Will Be Brothers (1973) – Frau Schermoly
- Derrick (1975–1976, TV Series) – Toilettenfrau / Frau Hofer
- Haus der Frauen (1977, TV Movie) – Zofia
