= Ostrva =

1963 film

- Directed by: Jovan Živanović
- Written by: Jug Grizelj; Rolf Schulz
- Starring: Peter Van Eyck; Elke Sommer; Blazenka Katalinic; Tori Jankovic
- Distributed by: Europix (United States)
- Release date: 22 May 1963
- Running time: 80 minutes
- Countries: Germany; Yugoslavia
- Languages: German; Serbo-Croat

Ostrva (German: Verführung am Meer) is a 1963 German-Yugoslav drama film directed by Jovan Živanović and starring Peter Van Eyck, Elke Sommer, Blazenka Katalinic and Tori Jankovic.

The English title is Seduction by the Sea.

== Plot ==
A young recently divorced German tourist is hired by a concerned mother to visit her son, who is living a hermit life on an island in the Adriatic Sea, and persuade him to come home. Instead she falls in love with him and his life in seclusion.

== Cast ==
- Peter Van Eyck as Peter
- Elke Sommer as Elke
- Blazenka Katalinic as Peter's Mother
- Tori Jankovic
- Edith Schultze-Westrum
