= The Adventure of Sherlock Holmes' Smarter Brother =

1975 film by Gene Wilder

- Promotional poster
- Directed by: Gene Wilder
- Written by: Gene Wilder
- Produced by: Richard A. Roth
- Starring: Gene Wilder; Madeline Kahn; Marty Feldman; Dom DeLuise; Leo McKern
- Cinematography: Gerry Fisher
- Edited by: Jim Clark
- Music by: John Morris
- Production company: Jouer Films
- Distributed by: 20th Century Fox
- Release date: December 14, 1975
- Running time: 91 minutes
- Countries: United Kingdom; United States
- Language: English
- Budget: $2,805,000
- Box office: $20,000,000

The Adventure of Sherlock Holmes' Smarter Brother is a 1975 American musical comedy film with Gene Wilder, Marty Feldman, Madeline Kahn, Dom DeLuise, Roy Kinnear, and Leo McKern. The film was Wilder's directorial debut, from his own original script.

Douglas Wilmer and Thorley Walters appear respectively as Sherlock Holmes and Dr. Watson. Wilmer had previously appeared as Sherlock Holmes in the 1960s BBC TV series, and Walters played Watson in three other films: Sherlock Holmes and the Deadly Necklace (1962), The Best House in London (1969), and Silver Blaze (1977).

== Plot ==
In 1891, Foreign Secretary Lord Redcliff haphazardly receives a document from Queen Victoria; the document is stolen from his safe later that night. Sherlock Holmes and Dr. Watson discuss the case. Deciding to lie low for a while, Holmes informs Watson that he will delegate cases to his younger brother, Sigerson, who has toiled in his brother's shadow without credit for decades. At a railway station, Holmes passes the message to Scotland Yard records clerk Orville Sacker.

Arriving at Sigerson's flat, Sacker finds him practicing his fencing and swordplay. Sigerson expresses bitterness and resentment over being unable to replicate Sherlock's success, mocking his big brother as "Sheer Luck" Holmes. Sigerson is also a private investigator. Arriving next is a woman claiming to be Bessie Bellwood, but who is really Jenny Hill, a music hall singer who believes she is being blackmailed by opera singer Eduardo Gambetti over a lewd letter she sent him. Sigerson sees through her immediately.

Sigerson attends one of Hill's performances and twice saves her from attempts on her life. The next day, he seduces her in her dressing room. She reveals that she stole the document from Redcliff's safe and claims that Redcliff is her father. When Sigerson meets with Redcliff, he learns that Hill is in fact Redcliff's fiancée.

Gambetti has made a deal with Professor Moriarty to sell him the document, which foreign powers have offered £50,000 to acquire. Moriarty pays, but the distrustful Gambetti proposes that he hand over the document during the debut of his opera so that he has time to deposit the money. Sigerson and Sacker infiltrate the opera, which soon devolves into chaos. Sigerson and Moriarty confront each other backstage and are drawn into a sword fight that corners Sigerson on an outside ledge; Moriarty taunts Sigerson by saying Sherlock was a greater challenge to him because of superior foresight. Under threat of death, Sigerson agrees to hand over what Moriarty thinks is the document before the chimes of Big Ben cause Moriarty to lose balance and plunge into the water below. Moriarty opens the document to reveal a game of tic-tac-toe: Sigerson had foreseen this and positioned the real document for Sherlock to recover.

The final scene is of Sigerson Holmes running through a park to attend Jenny and Redcliff's wedding. Sitting on a bench in the park, Jenny tells Sigerson that she has called off the wedding, as Sherlock and Watson watch in disguise. Sigerson and Jenny joyfully reconcile and dance.

== Cast ==
- Gene Wilder as Sigerson Holmes
- Madeline Kahn as Jenny Hill
- Marty Feldman as Sgt. Orville Stanley Sacker
- Dom DeLuise as Eduardo Gambetti
- Leo McKern as Professor Moriarty
- Roy Kinnear as Finney, Moriarty's assistant
- John Le Mesurier as Lord Redcliff, the Foreign Secretary.
- Douglas Wilmer as Sherlock Holmes
- Thorley Walters as Dr. Watson
- George Silver as Bruner
- Nicholas Smith as Hunkston
- John Hollis as Moriarty's Gunman
- Aubrey Morris as Coach Driver
- Tommy Godfrey as Fred
- Wolfe Morris as Frenchman, bidding for Redcliffe Document
- Julian Orchard as Man in Tails
- Kenneth Benda as Butler
- Tony Sympson as Opera Conductor
- Mel Brooks as the voice of the lion victim (uncredited)
- Albert Finney as Man in Audience at Opera (uncredited)

== Production ==
Gene Wilder was having lunch with Richard Roth when it was suggested that Wilder spoof Sherlock Holmes, but Wilder expressed doubts about making fun of such an iconic character. Roth approached Wilder again a week later and inquired if Wilder had given any more thought to the idea of a Sherlock Holmes film. Wilder replied "No, but I have given a great deal of thought to Sherlock's insanely jealous brother Sigi." Wilder began writing the screenplay as production was wrapping on Young Frankenstein, writing in parts for his co-stars Madeline Kahn and Marty Feldman.

On the set of Young Frankenstein, Mel Brooks warned Wilder that now that he was writing movies, he would eventually move to directing movies to protect his scripts. After Smarter Brother, Wilder went on to write, direct, and star in three more features over the next ten years (The World's Greatest Lover in 1977, The Woman in Red in 1984 and Haunted Honeymoon in 1986).

== Reception ==
=== Box office ===
The film earned $9.4 million in rentals in North America during its theatrical release.

=== Critical response ===
Vincent Canby of The New York Times called the film "a charming slapstick comedy" that like Young Frankenstein "is full of affection and generous feelings for the genre it's having fun with." Arthur D. Murphy of Variety wrote, "Gene Wilder now joins Brooks in that elusive pantheon of madcap humor, by virtue of Wilder's script, title characterization and directorial debut, all of which are outstanding." Gene Siskel of the Chicago Tribune gave the film two stars out of four, calling it "tedious" and Sigerson "a bland character at the center of a gimmick-filled movie" that "recalls the great detective only by name and occasional costume. There's really no story here, and certainly no mystery." Charles Champlin of the Los Angeles Times declared it "a light, easy, brisk but unforced, professional, kindly and ingratiating trip through Holmes' sweet home as it never was".

Gary Arnold of The Washington Post called it "an enjoyable, encouraging beginning" to Wilder's career as a writer-director that "reveals a surprisingly inventive and conscientious comic imagination at work". Pauline Kael of The New Yorker wrote that Wilder "wrote the roles for the actors but didn't write characters for them to play. He provided lots of lovely, sideswiping bits of business but no conceptions that would allow the actors to surprise us with something new or that would enable us to get involved in what's happening to them." John Pym of The Monthly Film Bulletin called it "better in its parts than as a whole, and essentially a showcase for the individual performances of Wilder himself, Marty Feldman, Madeline Kahn and, particularly, the perpetually energised, rubber-faced Dom DeLuise."

The Adventure of Sherlock Holmes Smarter Brother holds a 60% rating on Rotten Tomatoes based on ten reviews.

== Home media ==
The film was released on DVD on April 4, 2006.

== See also ==
- List of American films of 1975
