= Bully Boy =

Play by Sandi Toksvig

Bully Boy is a play by British-Danish playwright and comedian Sandi Toksvig. The show opened at the Nuffield Theatre in Southampton, on 13 May 2011, with Anthony Andrews as Major Oscar Hadley and Joshua Miles as Private Eddie Clark. The play then launched the debut season of St James Theatre in September 2012, the first new West End theatre to open in 30 years.

== Plot ==
The play considers the impact of war on the relationship between an officer, Oscar, who uses a wheelchair after service in the Falklands, and Eddie, a young private accused of throwing an eight-year-old boy down a well during a raid in the Middle East. The show is critical of politicians who launch wars without regard for the consequences.
