= Direct entry officer =

A direct entry officer, or DEO, is a commissioned officer in the British, Canadian, and Australian armies. In the Royal Air Force, such officers are usually described as direct entrants. A direct entry officer is normally commissioned directly from civilian status, although he can also be commissioned from lower army ranks. Most DEOs are under the age of thirty when they are commissioned.

== Sources ==
Website

- "DAOD 5002-2, Direct Entry Officer Plan - Regular Force". 2004.
