= John Hillerman =

American actor (1932–2017)

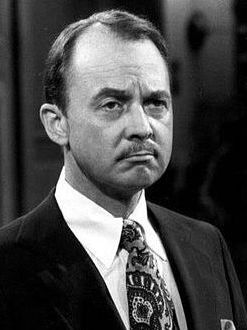
- Hillerman in The Betty White Show, 1977
- Born: John Benedict Hillerman; December 20, 1932; Denison, Texas, U.S.
- Died: November 9, 2017 (aged 84); Houston, Texas, U.S.
- Education: University of Texas at Austin
- Occupation: Actor
- Years active: 1957–1999
- Military career
- Allegiance: United States
- Branch: United States Air Force
- Service years: 1953–1957
- Rank: Staff Sergeant
- Units: Strategic Air Command

John Benedict Hillerman (December 20, 1932 – November 9, 2017) was an American actor best known for his starring role as Jonathan Quayle Higgins III on the television series Magnum, P.I. that aired from 1980 to 1988. For his role as Higgins, Hillerman earned five Golden Globe nominations, winning in 1981, and four Emmy nominations, winning in 1987. He retired from acting in 1999.

== Early life and career ==
Hillerman was born in Denison, Texas, the son of Christopher Benedict Hillerman, a gas station owner, and Lenora Joan (née Medlinger). He was the middle child with two sisters. His father was the grandson of immigrants from Germany and Holland, and his mother the daughter of immigrants from Austria and Germany. He was a first cousin once removed of author Tony Hillerman. Hillerman developed an interest in opera at the age of ten, and traveled to Dallas to watch Metropolitan Opera productions. He attended St. Xavier's Academy, and after graduation, he attended the University of Texas at Austin for three years, majoring in journalism.

Hillerman served four years in the United States Air Force (1953–1957), working in maintenance in a B-36 wing of the Strategic Air Command, and achieving the rank of Staff Sergeant. He became interested in acting after working with a theatrical group in Fort Worth during his service: "I was bored with barracks life. I got into [acting] to meet people in town. A light went on." After his 1957 discharge, he moved to New York City to study at the American Theatre Wing, and performed in professional theater for the next twelve years, in productions such as Henry IV, Part 2 and The Great God Brown. Despite over 100 stage roles, Hillerman was unable to make a living as a stage actor, and he moved to Hollywood in 1969.

== Career ==
=== Film ===
Hillerman made his film debut in They Call Me Mister Tibbs! (1970) in an uncredited role as a reporter. Director Peter Bogdanovich, with whom Hillerman had previously worked during his stage career, cast Hillerman in his films The Last Picture Show; What's Up, Doc?; and Paper Moon. Hillerman worked steadily thereafter in motion pictures and television through the 1970s, including notable supporting roles in the 1974 films Chinatown and Blazing Saddles. After being cast in Magnum, P.I., he appeared in four further films between 1980 and 1996, with his final film performance coming in A Very Brady Sequel.

=== Television ===
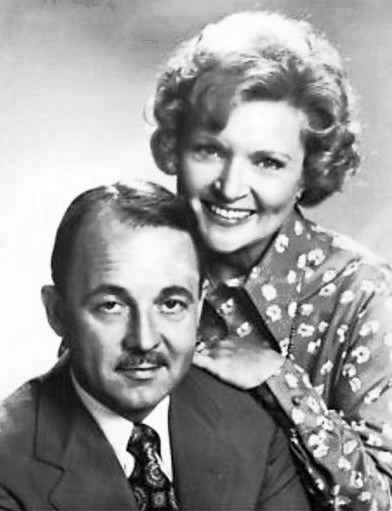
Hillerman and Betty White in a 1977 publicity photo for The Betty White Show

In 1975, Hillerman was a co-star in Ellery Queen as Simon Brimmer, a radio detective who hosted a radio show and tried to outsmart the title character (Jim Hutton). From 1976 to 1980, he had a recurring role as Mr. Conners on the sitcom One Day at a Time, and he co-starred as Betty White's estranged husband on The Betty White Show (1977–1978). He appeared in season 1, episode 6 of Wonder Woman (Wonder Woman vs. Gargantua) as a Nazi defector. In 1978, Hillerman also appeared in an episode of Little House on the Prairie called "Harriet's Happenings." In 1979, Hillerman performed on a television pilot for an American version of the British situation comedy Are You Being Served?, Beanes of Boston, as Mr. John Peacock, an American translation of the original British character, Captain Peacock.

He is best remembered for his role as former British Army Sergeant Major Jonathan Higgins in Magnum, P.I. (1980–1988). He learned to speak in the character's educated middle/upper class English accent, known as Received Pronunciation or the King's/Queen's English, by listening to a recording of Laurence Olivier reciting Hamlet. (Note: An article about Hillerman in Orange Coast magazine in June 1988 said, "... the accent supplanted a thick drawl. Born and raised in Texas, he [Hillerman] trained away the drawl in a year of intensive work in New York's American Theatre Wing.") He considered Higgins his favorite role, and described the character in a 1988 interview as "think[ing] he's the only sane character [in the show], and everyone else is stark raving mad." Hillerman recalled in 1984 that he was up for a role in the 1980 Buck Henry/Bob Newhart film First Family and "wanted the part very badly," and had he gotten the role, he would have turned down the role of Higgins.

In 1982, Hillerman starred in the television pilot of Tales of the Gold Monkey, as a German villain named Fritz the Monocle. He hosted the 1984 David Hemmings-directed puzzle video Money Hunt: The Mystery of the Missing Link. In 1990, Hillerman returned to television as Lloyd Hogan in the sixth and final season of the sitcom The Hogan Family. That same year, he portrayed Dr. Watson to Edward Woodward's Sherlock Holmes in Hands of a Murderer.

In 1993, he appeared in Berlin Break for one season. He played the role of Mac MacKenzie, a former spy and currently the proprietor of Mac's, a bar in West Berlin considered to be neutral territory during the Cold War. Mac teamed up with two jobless spies as investigators: Valentin Renko (Nicholas Clay), an ex-KGB agent, and Willy Richter (Kai Wulff), an ex-BND (West German secret service) operative. The show reunited him with Jeff MacKay, who portrayed "Mac" MacReynolds in Magnum P.I..

== Later years and death ==
After Hillerman retired from acting in 1999, he returned to his home state of Texas. On November 9, 2017, he died of cardiovascular disease at his Houston home, at the age of 84.

== Filmography ==
=== Film ===
Year	Title	Role	Notes
1970	They Call Me Mister Tibbs!	Reporter	Uncredited
1971	Lawman	Totts	
1971	The Last Picture Show	Teacher	
1971	Honky		
1972	What's Up, Doc?	Hotel Manager Kaltenborn	
1972	The Carey Treatment	Jenkins	
1972	Skyjacked	Walter Brandt	
1972	The Outside Man	Department Store Manager	
1973	The Thief Who Came to Dinner	Edmund Lasker	
1973	High Plains Drifter	Bootmaker	
1973	Paper Moon	Deputy Hardin / Jess Hardin	
1973	The Naked Ape	Psychiatrist	
1974	Blazing Saddles	Howard Johnson	
1974	The Nickel Ride	Carl	
1974	Chinatown	Russ Yelburton	
1975	At Long Last Love	Rodney James	
1975	The Day of the Locust	Ned Grote	
1975	Lucky Lady	McTeague	
1977	Audrey Rose	Scott Velie	
1979	Sunburn	Webb	
1981	History of the World, Part I	Rich Man	(The French Revolution)
1984	Up the Creek	Dean Burch	
1989	Gummibärchen küßt man nicht	Padre	
1996	A Very Brady Sequel	Dr. Whitehead	(final film role)

=== Television ===
Year	Title	Role	Notes
1971	Sweet, Sweet Rachel	Medical Examiner	Television film
1972	The Sixth Sense	Adrian Weems	Episode: "Once Upon a Chilling"
1972	Mannix	Larry Lawton	Episode: "Light and Shadow"
1972	The Great Man's Whiskers	Major Underwood	Television film
1973	Mannix	J. H. Morell	Episode: "Silent Target"
1974	Maude	Drunk	Episode: "The Commuter Station"
1974	Kojak	Mark Gallant	Episode: "The Only Way Out"
1974	The Law	Thomas Rachel	Television film
1975	Mannix	Norman Thompson	Episode: "Search for a Dead Man"
1975	The Bob Crane Show	Dean Harrington	Episode: "The Son of the Campus Capers"
1975–1976	Ellery Queen	Simon Brimmer	8 episodes
1976	Serpico	Raoul Christie	Episode: "Rapid Fire"
1976	Hawaii Five-O	Donald Blair	Episode: "Man on Fire"
1976	Wonder Woman	Conrad Steigler	Episode: "Wonder Woman vs Gargantua"
1976–1980	One Day at a Time	Mr. Connors	6 episodes
1977	Delvecchio	Dr. Augustus Hamilton	Episode: "Licensed to Kill"
1977–1978	The Betty White Show	John Elliott	14 episodes
1978	Hawaii Five-O	Nelson Bodine	Episode: "A Stranger in His Grave"
1978	Little House on the Prairie	Sterling Murdock	Episode: "Harriet's Happening"
1979	The Love Boat	Ed Hartnett	2 episodes
1979	Beane's of Boston	John Peacock	Pilot
1980	Soap	Minister	Episode: "3.12"
1980	Young Maverick	McBurney	Episode: "Makin' Tracks"
1980	Hart to Hart	Victor Sutter	Episode: "Cruise At Your Own Risk"
1980	Tenspeed and Brown Shoe	William Whitney	Episode: "Diamonds Aren't Forever"
1980	Lou Grant	Sturbridge	Episode: "Pack"
1980–1988	Magnum, P.I.	Jonathan Higgins	158 episodes Golden Globe Award for Best Supporting Actor – Series, Miniseries or Television Film; Primetime Emmy Award for Outstanding Supporting Actor in a Drama Series; Nominated—Golden Globe Award for Best Supporting Actor – Series, Miniseries or Television Film (1983, 1985, 1987–1988); Nominated—Primetime Emmy Award for Outstanding Supporting Actor in a Drama Series (1984–1986)
1982	Tales of the Gold Monkey	Monocle	2 episodes
1982	Simon & Simon	Jonathan Higgins	Episode: "Emeralds Are Not a Girl's Best Friend"
1983	The Love Boat	Manfred	Episode: "The Last Case"
1986	Murder, She Wrote	Jonathan Higgins	Episode: "Magnum on Ice"
1987	Assault and Matrimony	Neighbor, Cyril	Television film
1989	Around the World in 80 Days	Sir Francis Commarty	3 episodes
1990	Hands of a Murderer	Dr. John Watson	Television film
1990–1991	The Hogan Family	Lloyd Hogan	13 episodes
1992	Murder, She Wrote	Edgar Greenstreet	Episode: "Murder on Madison Avenue"

== Awards and nominations ==
Year	Award	Nominated work	Result
Primetime Emmy Awards
1984	Outstanding Supporting Actor in a Drama Series	Magnum, P.I.	Nominated
1985	Outstanding Supporting Actor in a Drama Series	Magnum, P.I.	Nominated
1986	Outstanding Supporting Actor in a Drama Series	Magnum, P.I.	Nominated
1987	Outstanding Supporting Actor in a Drama Series	Magnum, P.I.	Won
Golden Globe Awards
1982	Best Supporting Actor – Series, Miniseries or Television Film	Magnum, P.I.	Won
1983	Best Supporting Actor – Series, Miniseries or Television Film	Magnum, P.I.	Nominated
1985	Best Supporting Actor – Series, Miniseries or Television Film	Magnum, P.I.	Nominated
1987	Best Supporting Actor – Series, Miniseries or Television Film	Magnum, P.I.	Nominated
1988	Best Supporting Actor – Series, Miniseries or Television Film	Magnum, P.I.	Nominated
