= Otto Plaschkes =

British film producer

Otto Plaschkes (13 September 1929 – 14 February 2005) was a British film producer.

== Early life ==
Plaschkes was born in Vienna. His father, a butcher, was from Bratislava and his mother from Budapest. Plaschkes left for England at the age of ten, although he always expressed doubts about his date of birth—his personal papers gave three different birth dates—and felt that his mother may have added a year to qualify him for the kindertransport, which enabled him to escape the Nazi regime.

After arriving in England, he was temporarily adopted by a family in Liverpool, but, more fortunately than many other Jewish refugees, was soon reunited with his parents, younger brother and older sister in Salisbury, where he was to grow up and where his father started a sausage casing business. Plaschkes attended Bishop Wordsworth's School, where William Golding was amongst his teachers; many of his contemporaries have claimed that he was in fact the inspiration for the sensitive, overweight character of Piggy in Golding's Lord of the Flies, a claim which Golding never confirmed or denied.

Plaschkes went on to read History at Peterhouse, Cambridge, where he was a member of the Cambridge Film Society, and then took an education diploma at Wadham College, Oxford.

== Career ==
Having gained an enthusiasm for film, he wrote to Sir Michael Balcon at Ealing Studios, who offered him a job as a runner. He was soon promoted to production assistant and also worked in the cutting room.

By 1960, he was assistant director to Otto Preminger on Exodus and in 1962 worked as a production assistant on Lawrence of Arabia. He went on to become a producer in his own right: in 1965 he bought the rights to the Margaret Forster novel Georgy Girl, casting James Mason and Lynn Redgrave (after her sister Vanessa dropped out) in the leads. The film went on to be a great success. Plaschkes was keen to have his favourite singing group, The Seekers, record the title song for Georgy Girl. The song was written by Tom Springfield (music) and Jim Dale (lyrics), and recorded by the Seekers as opening and closing credits for the film, and a second version as a composite recording for inclusion on the group's Come The Day album. When Capitol Records released it in the US as a single, it went to number one, displacing The Monkees' "I'm a Believer," and making the Seekers the first Australian group to top the US charts. Among the other films he produced were The Homecoming (1973), Galileo (1975) and Hopscotch (1980), which was his most commercially successful film.

== Personal life ==
Plaschkes met his future wife, Louise Stein, at an after shooting party for The Homecoming, and they married in 1975, later having a daughter, Valli.

On Valentine's Day 2005, Plaschkes, as a member of the Academy of Motion Picture Arts and Sciences, had just attended a West End screening of Kay Pollak's As It Is in Heaven, which had been nominated for the Oscar for best foreign language film. On leaving the theatre, he suffered a fatal heart attack. He was 75 and was survived by his wife and daughter.
