= The Best House in London =

1969 British film by Philip Saville

- Theatrical poster
- Directed by: Philip Saville
- Written by: Denis Norden
- Produced by: Kurt Unger; Philip M. Breen
- Starring: David Hemmings; Joanna Pettet; George Sanders; Bill Fraser
- Cinematography: Alex Thomson
- Edited by: Peter Tanner
- Music by: Mischa Spoliansky
- Production company: Bridge Film
- Distributed by: Metro-Goldwyn-Mayer
- Release date: 12 June 1969
- Running time: 97 minutes (UK)
- Country: United Kingdom
- Language: English
- Box office: $374,655 (US)

The Best House in London is a 1969 British historical comedy film directed by Philip Saville and starring David Hemmings, Joanna Pettet, George Sanders, Warren Mitchell, John Bird, Maurice Denham and Bill Fraser. It was written by Dennis Norden.

== Plot ==
Victorian London. Sir Francis Leybourne is an aristocrat, city councillor, land baron, and businessman with interests in the far east. Like most aristocrats, more important for the married ones in needing refuge from one's wife, widowed Sir Francis has a kept woman, Babette. What Sir Francis doesn't know is that Babette is also sleeping with his estranged son, Walter Leybourne, their mission to get Walter back into Sir Francis' will as his primary beneficiary. It is in the role of land baron that Sir Francis is approached by the Minister in charge to head the pilot on a new initiative: to open London's first bordello. This effort is in understanding the necessary role of prostitutes in aristocratic society, yet get them off the streets, this house modeled on the French way. Concurrently, Sir Francis' orphaned young adult niece, Josephine Pacefoot, heads the League of Social Purity, a reformist organization aimed at giving streetwalkers technical skills to get them out of prostitution. She has recently joined forces with Benjamin Oakes, a freelance publicist, his current primary contract to publicize the work of Italian Count Pandolfo who is building an airship i.e. a dirigible. Benjamin confesses to Josephine that he is a bastard, his long passed mother, a servant, never having told him the identity of his father, a birthmark on his wrist the only clue as to who his father is. Benjamin wants to help Josephine publicize her work in further helping young women caught in prostitution. Further complications ensue when Sir Francis unexpectedly passes away, he having left his entire estate to Josephine including his London property, Belgravia Hall, where, in his temporary absence in a business trip to India, he left the task of setting up the property as that bordello to Babette. As such, Walter, with Babette by his side, does whatever required to obtain the property from Josephine to run the bordello as planned, Josephine, in her naïveté, having no idea of Sir Francis' plan for the house, she wanting to use it to further her work for the League.

== Cast ==
- David Hemmings as Benjamin Oakes / Walter Leybourne
- Joanna Pettet as Josephie Pacefoot
- George Sanders as Sir Francis Leybourne
- Dany Robin as Babette
- Warren Mitchell as Count Pandolfo
- John Bird as Home Secretary
- Jan Holden as Lady Dilke
- William Rushton as Sylvester Wall
- Bill Fraser as Inspector MacPherson
- Maurice Denham as Editor of The Times newspaper
- Wolfe Morris as Chinese Trade Attache
- Martita Hunt as headmistress
- Arnold Diamond as Charles Dickens
- Hugh Burden as Lord Tennyson
- Carol Friday as Flora
- Avril Angers as Flora's mother
- Betty Marsden as Felicity
- Tessie O'Shea as singer
- Arthur Howard as Mr. Fortnum
- Clement Freud as Mr. Mason
- Peter Jeffrey as Sherlock Holmes
- Thorley Walters as Doctor Watson
- John Cleese as Jones
- Margaret Nolan as prostitute
- Penny Spencer as Evelyn
- Veronica Carlson as Lily

== Critical reception ==
The Monthly Film Bulletin wrote: "A kind of omnibus collection of mock-Victoriana, Denis Norden's original screenplay for The Best House in London revels in a sunny disrespect for the life and times. This light-hearted irreverence is enjoyable, at least until the whimsy starts to run out of wind. Then the film sadly misses some more concentrated satire. There are delicious hints in early scenes, mocking the preoccupations of Victorian men of trade and their splendid but inglorious faith in the all-enveloping protection of their country's flag. The fiendishly complicated plot ridicules the devices and ingredients of Victorian serial novels ... But the verbal squibs, the little cameos of visual comedy amid the period bric-d-brac, and the wild farce of the finale, make an ill-assorted film."

Variety wrote that the film "carries exvensive and often-lush mounting, also an over-abundance of meaningless scenes and silly dialog intended to strike a tongue-in-cheek chord. That it misses is due to producers going overboard in their efforts to turn out a zany comedy."

Boxoffice wrote: "Metro-Goldwyn-Mayer, in its first 'X' rated film, has come up with a no-holds-barred, fun-filled sex romp through Victorian London. ...The film has an ample supply of nude bosoms and there is a chase sequence through the 'men's club,' revealing perverted pleasures not to be equaled on the screen since Shelley Winters set up housekeeping in The Balcony [1963]. ... Strictly for sophisticated audiences."

Leslie Halliwell said: "Cheerful slam-bang historical send-up with as many dull thuds of banality as pleasant witticisms."
