= Groeneveld (surname) =

Groeneveld is a Dutch toponymic surname. Literally translated as "green field", the name may refer to someone living on or owning green fields or may indicate an origin in the villages Groeneveld or Groenveld. People with the name include:

- Alexandra Kamp-Groeneveld (born 1966), German model and actress
- Arnaut Groeneveld (born 1997), Dutch football midfielder
- Daphne Groeneveld (born 1994), Dutch model
- George Groeneveld (born 1941), Canadian politician
- Ingrid Groeneveld (1921–2015), Dutch astronomer, namesake of the asteroid 1674 Groeneveld
- Jan Groenveld (1945–2002), Australian critic of new religious movements
- John Groenveldt (c.1647-1710), Dutch physician with a practice in England
- Margaretha Groeneveld (born 1956), Dutch singer and television presenter known as "Marcha" or "Marga Bult"
- Phil Groeneveld (born 1974), Canadian ice hockey goaltender
- Reinier van Groeneveld (c.1588–1623), Dutch political figure, son of Johan van Oldenbarnevelt
- Renee Groeneveld (born 1986), Dutch competitive sailor
- Steve Groeneveld (born 1973), Legends car racer
- Sara Groenevelt (died 1899), American pianist and litterateur
- Sven Groeneveld (born 1965), Dutch tennis player
- Warren Groeneveld (born 1983), South African cricketer
- Willem Groeneveld (born 1990), Namibian cricketer
- Fabiënne Nicole Groeneveld (born 1999), Indonesian-Dutch businesswoman, model, Miss Universe Indonesia 2023

== See also ==
- Groeneveld (disambiguation)
- Anna-Lena Grönefeld (born 1985), German tennis player
