= The Laughing Cavalier (novel) =

1914 adventure novel by Baroness Orczy

- First edition
- Author: Baroness Orczy
- Language: English
- Series: The Scarlet Pimpernel series
- Genre: Adventure, historical novel
- Publisher: Hodder & Stoughton (UK); George H. Doran Company (US)
- Publication date: 1914
- Publication place: United Kingdom
- Media type: Print (hardback)
- Pages: 406 pp
- Followed by: The First Sir Percy

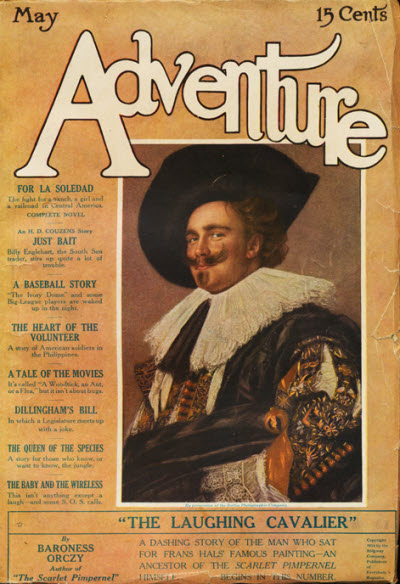
The Laughing Cavalier was serialised in Adventure magazine in 1914

The Laughing Cavalier is a historical adventure novel by Baroness Orczy, first published in 1914 by Hodder & Stoughton in the United Kingdom and by the George H. Doran Company in the United States. It was also serialised in Adventure magazine the same year. The novel's full subtitle is The Story of the Ancestor of the Scarlet Pimpernel.

The story is set in the Dutch Republic in 1623–1624 and centres on Diogenes, a swashbuckling English mercenary whose real name is Percy Blakeney—the ancestor of Sir Percy Blakeney, the hero of Orczy's famous Scarlet Pimpernel novels set during the French Revolution. The novel incorporates Frans Hals' 1624 painting The Laughing Cavalier into its plot, with Blakeney depicted as Hals' adopted son and the subject of the famous portrait. It was the fifth published novel in the Scarlet Pimpernel series, and its sequel, The First Sir Percy (1920), continues the story of the same character.

== Background ==
Baroness Orczy achieved literary fame with her play The Scarlet Pimpernel (1903) and its novelisation (1905), set during the Reign of Terror in revolutionary France. She wrote numerous sequels and related novels over the following decades. The Laughing Cavalier is unusual in the series in that it is set not during the French Revolution but nearly two centuries earlier, in the 17th-century Dutch Republic. Orczy, who had herself studied art at the West London School of Art and the Heatherley School of Fine Art, used the real historical painter Frans Hals as a character in the novel and built her plot around the origin of Hals' celebrated painting.

The Laughing Cavalier painting, completed in 1624, hangs in the Wallace Collection in London. It depicts an unidentified man with an enigmatic smile; the title "Laughing Cavalier" was an invention of the Victorian press when the painting was first exhibited in England in the 1870s. Orczy supplied an imaginative identity for the unnamed sitter, making him the ancestor of her most famous fictional creation.

The novel also draws on real Dutch political history. The antagonist, Willem van Oldenbarnevelt, Lord of Stoutenburg, and the events surrounding the execution of his father, statesman Johan van Oldenbarnevelt, by order of Stadtholder Maurice of Nassau, Prince of Orange, in 1619 are historical facts, though Orczy adapted them freely to suit her narrative, as was her custom throughout the Scarlet Pimpernel series.

The preface of the novel is signed "Emmuska Orczy. Haarlem, 1913," indicating it was completed before its 1914 publication.

== Plot summary ==
In March 1623, Willem van Oldenbarnevelt, Lord of Stoutenburg, is a fugitive. His father, the statesman Johan van Oldenbarnevelt ("John of Barneveld" in the novel), was accused of treason and executed by order of the Stadtholder, Maurice of Nassau, Prince of Orange, in 1619. His brother Reinier van Oldenbarnevelt, lord of Groeneveld, has also been executed for plotting to assassinate the Prince. Stoutenburg is now in hiding and bent on revenge.

Stoutenburg seeks shelter from Gilda Beresteyn, the daughter of a wealthy Haarlem merchant. Gilda was once in love with Stoutenburg but has never forgiven him for abandoning her to make a more profitable marriage. Despite her reservations, she shelters him briefly before sending him away, knowing her father, a friend of the Prince of Orange, would disapprove.

Nine months later, on New Year's Eve, Gilda witnesses three foreign adventurers protecting a Spanish woman from a mob in Haarlem. The mercenaries call themselves by the names of ancient philosophers: "Diogenes," "Socrates," and "Pythagoras." Gilda is attracted to Diogenes—in reality Percy Blakeney, the illegitimate son of an English nobleman and a Dutch woman—but he offends her by departing for a pub.

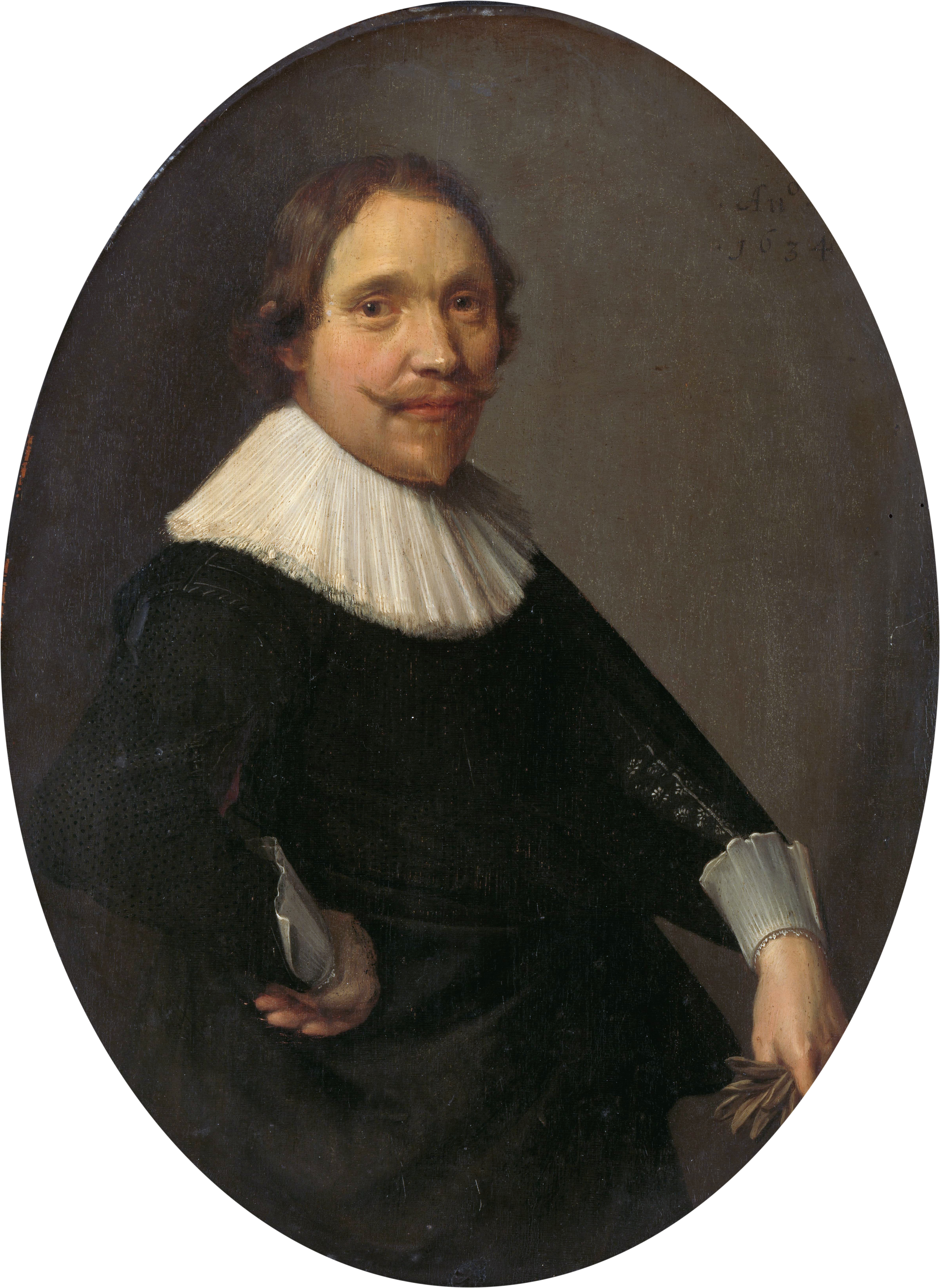
Willem van Oldenbarnevelt, Lord of Stoutenburg, anonymous portrait from 1634

Gilda continues to church but stays behind after the service to pray. She inadvertently overhears a secret meeting between Stoutenburg and his fellow conspirators, including her own brother Nicolaes, in which Stoutenburg reveals his plan to murder the Prince. When Nicolaes realises she has overheard, he begs Gilda to keep silent. She refuses, but Nicolaes tells the conspirators she can be trusted. Stoutenburg, unconvinced, persuades Nicolaes to send Gilda away until the assassination can be carried out.

Nicolaes hires Diogenes—whom he has seen at the pub—to kidnap Gilda. After seeing her portrait at Frans Hals' house, Diogenes recognises her as the woman he met the night before. With the help of the Spanish woman he earlier rescued, Diogenes abducts Gilda and her maid, transporting them out of Haarlem by sledge and leaving them in the care of Socrates and Pythagoras. He returns to Haarlem to sit for a painting by Hals. At the pub afterwards, he meets Gilda's distraught father. Nicolaes, furious at Diogenes' reappearance, cannot betray his role in the kidnapping. Caught between the two men, Diogenes finds himself promising Gilda's father he will find and return her.

Though Gilda could send Diogenes to the gallows with a single word, and despite her furious verbal attacks, he begins to develop deep feelings for her—a complication unwelcome to Stoutenburg, who remains determined to marry her.

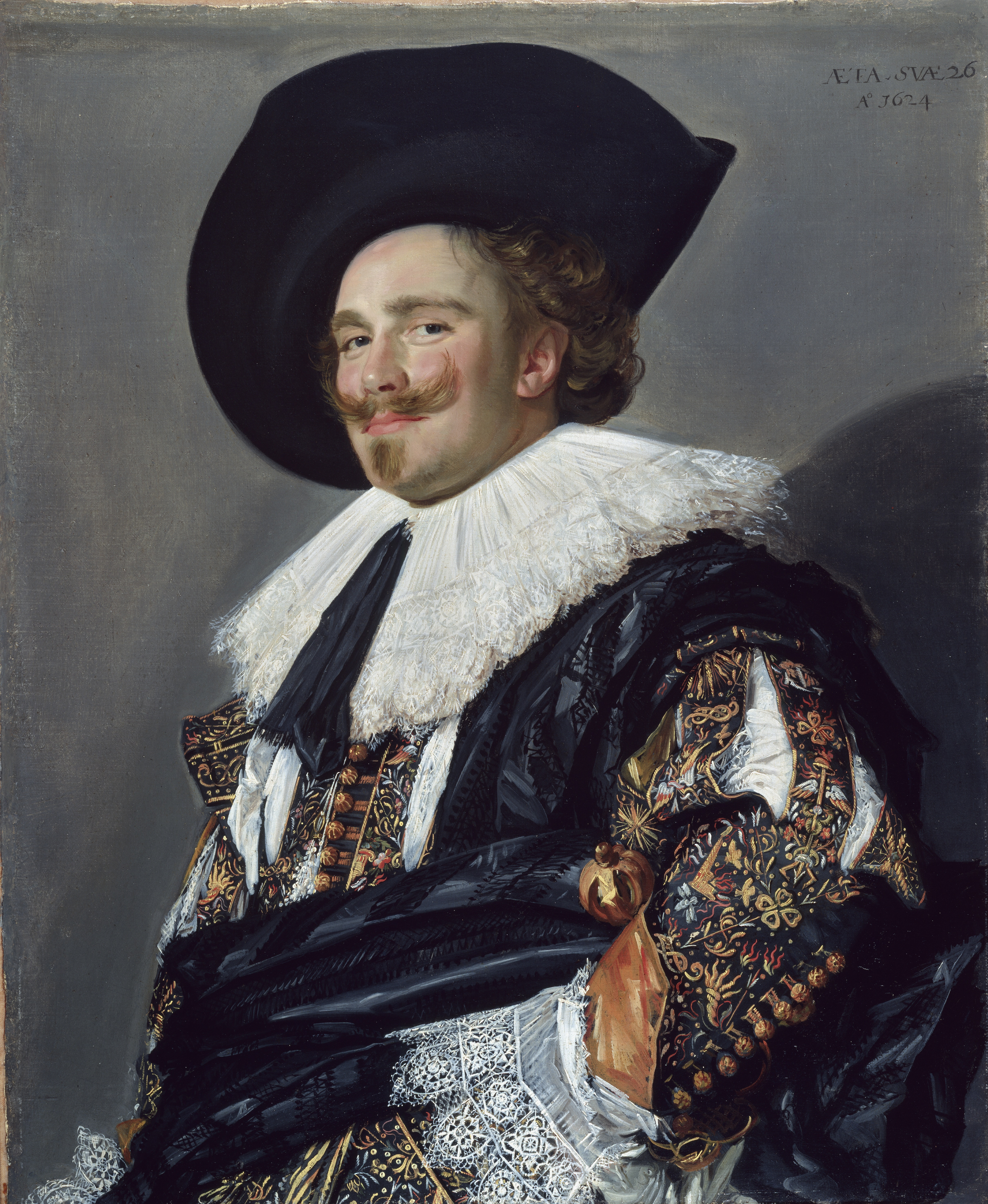
Laughing Cavalier by Frans Hals, 1624
