= 't Woudt =

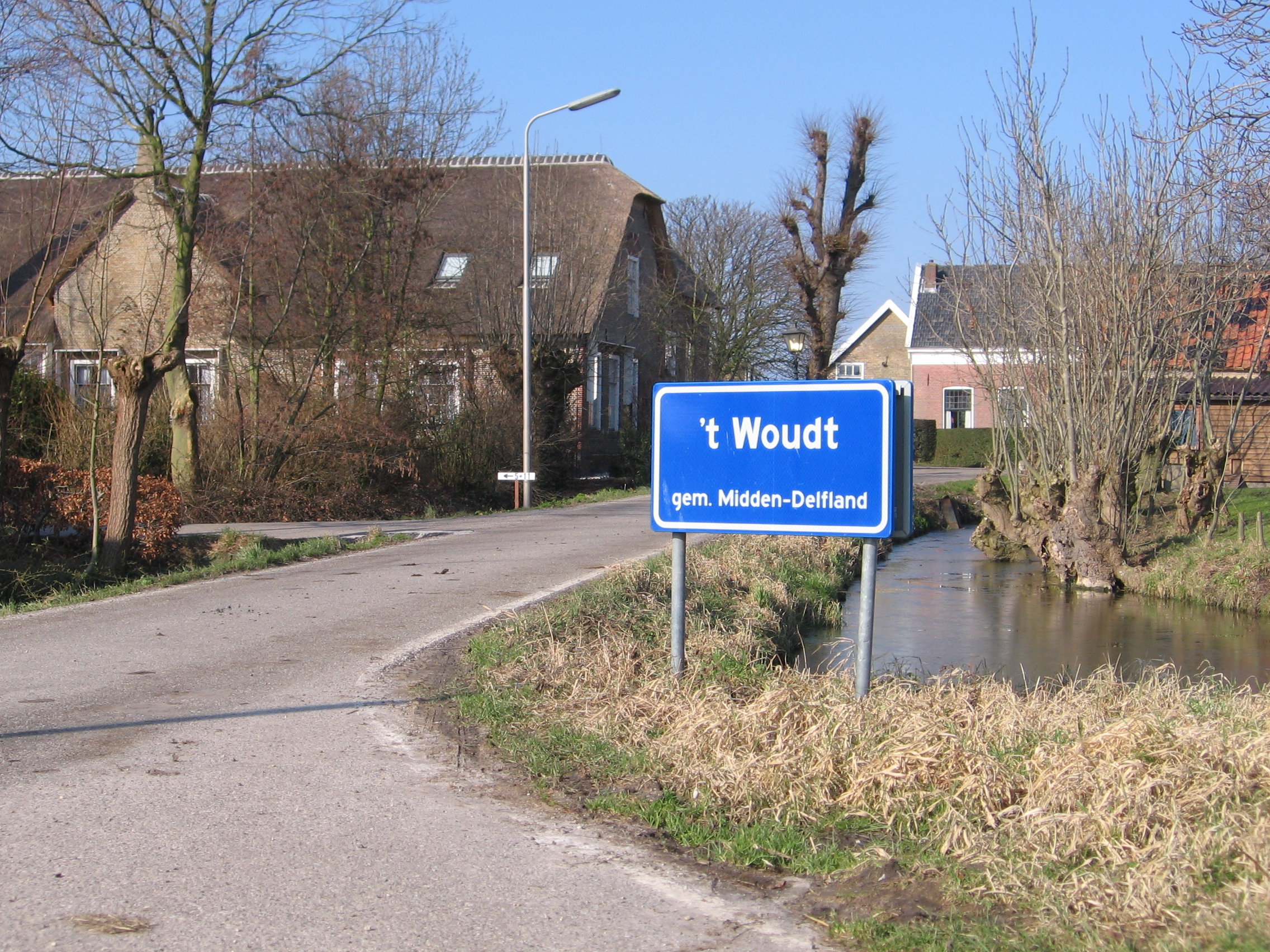

- Location within South Holland Location within Netherlands Location within Benelux
- Coordinates: 51°59′44″N 4°17′37″E
- Country: Netherlands
- Province: South Holland
- Municipality: Midden-Delfland

Population (2023)
  - Total: 33

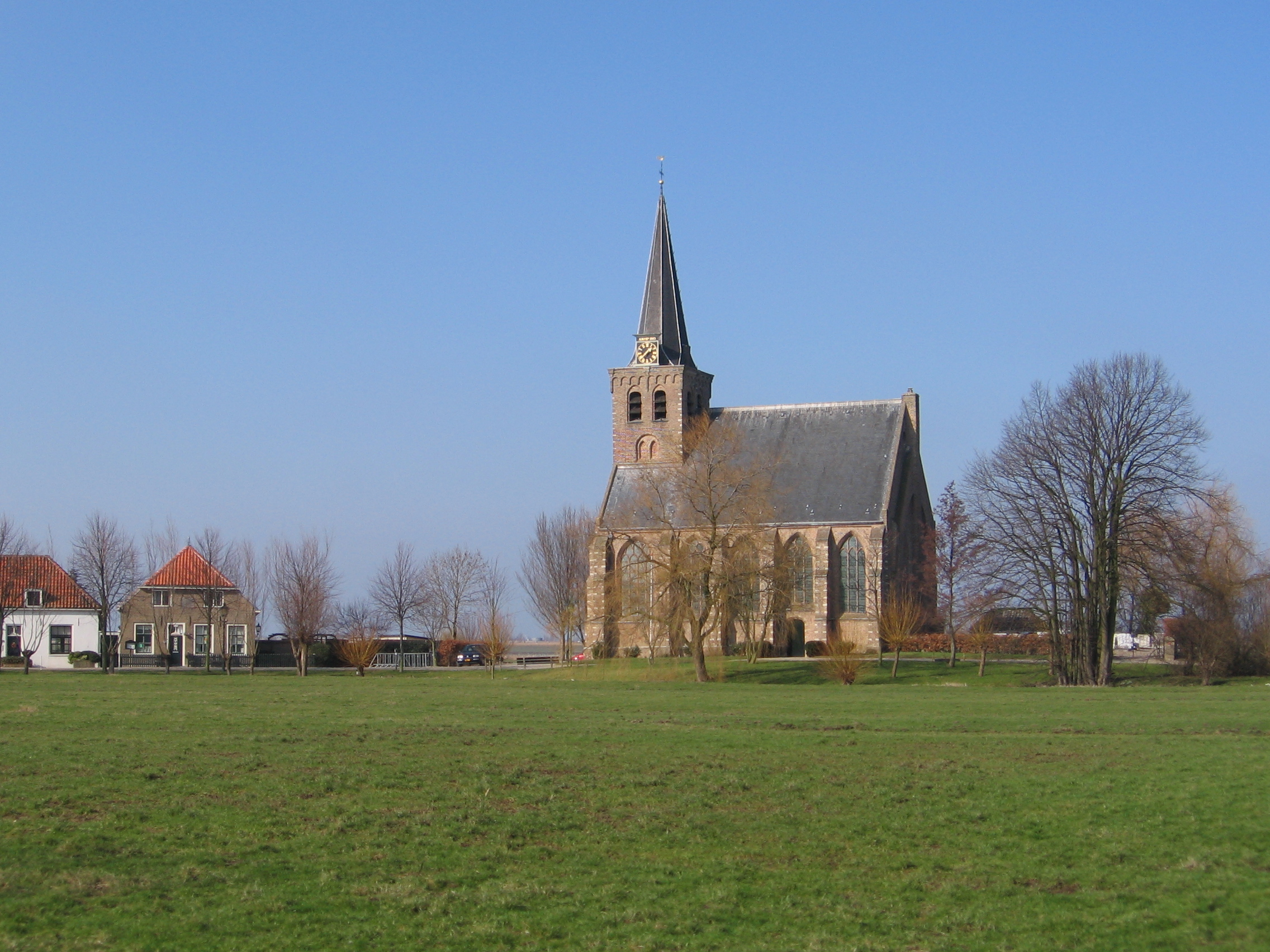
View from the village church

't Woudt is a small village in the Dutch province of South Holland. It is located about 5 km southwest of the city of Delft, in the municipality of Midden-Delfland.

't Woudt (then spelled "'t Woud") was a separate municipality between 1812 and 1817, when it was divided into Groeneveld, Hoog en Woud Harnasch, and a part that merged with Hof van Delft.
