= Laughing Cavalier =

1624 painting by Frans Hals

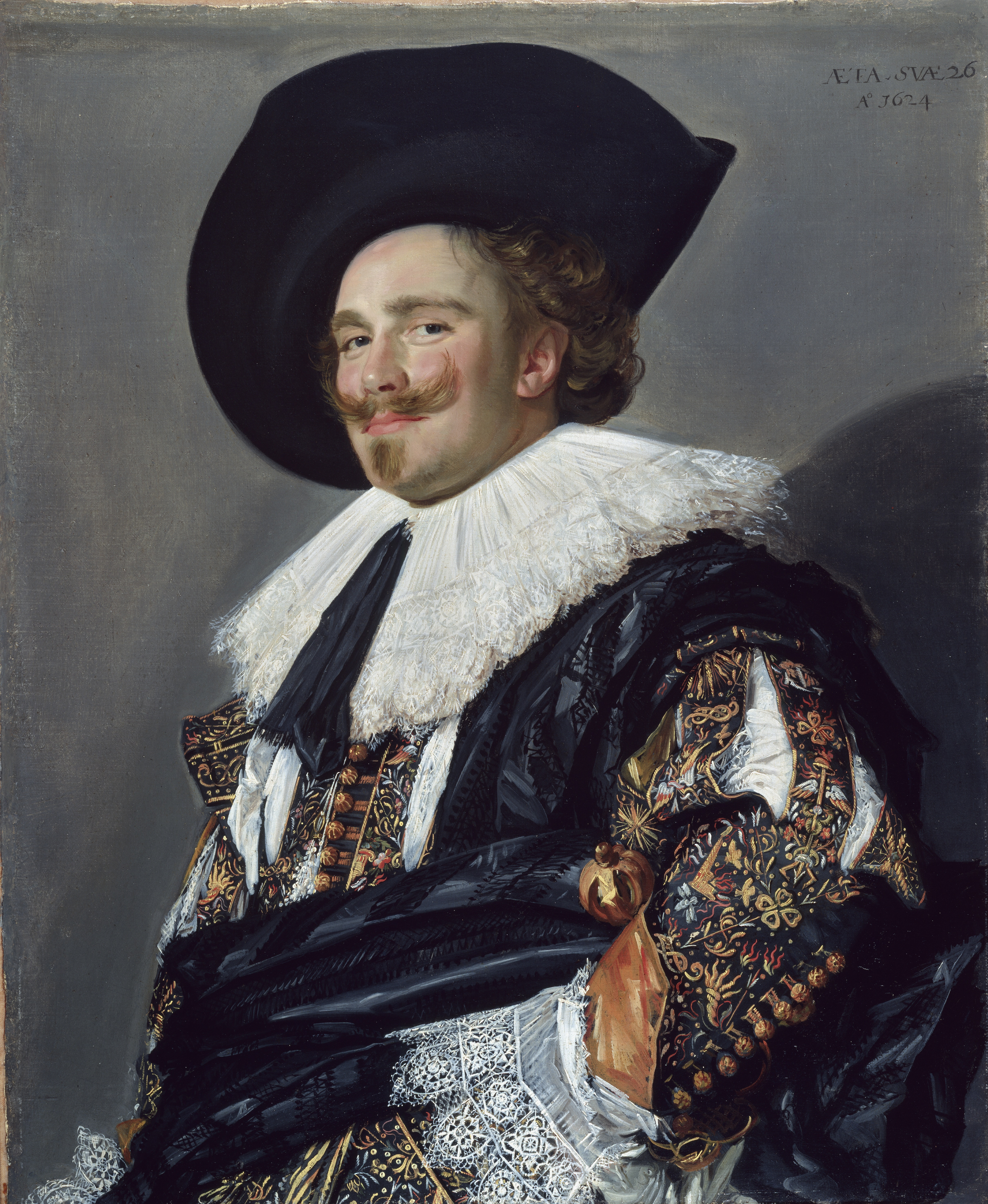
- Artist: Frans Hals
- Year: 1624
- Medium: Oil on canvas
- Dimensions: 83 cm × 67.3 cm (33 in × 26.5 in)
- Location: Wallace Collection; London

The Laughing Cavalier (1624) is a portrait by the Dutch Golden Age painter Frans Hals in the Wallace Collection in London. It was described by art historian Seymour Slive as "one of the most brilliant of all Baroque portraits". The title is an invention of the Victorian public and press, dating from its exhibition in the opening display at the Bethnal Green Museum in 1872–1875, just after its arrival in England, after which it was regularly reproduced as a print, and became one of the best known old master paintings in Britain. The unknown subject is in fact not laughing, but can be said to have an enigmatic smile, much amplified by his upturned moustache.

== Description ==
The portrait measures 83 cm × 67.3 cm (32.7 in × 26.5 in) and is inscribed at top right Æ'TA SVÆ 26/Aº1624, which expands to aetatis suae 26, anno 1624 in Latin and means that the portrait was painted when the sitter was 26 and in the year 1624, and was therefore born in 1597 or 1598. The identity of the man is unknown, and though the recorded 19th-century titles in Dutch, English and French mostly suggest a military man, or at least an officer in one of the part-time militia companies that were often the subjects of group portraits, including some by Hals and later Rembrandt's The Night Watch (1642), in fact he was as likely to be a wealthy civilian. Art historian Pieter Biesboer suggests the painting may depict Dutch cloth merchant Tieleman Roosterman (1598–1673), who is also the subject of another Hals portrait.

The composition is lively and spontaneous, and despite the apparent labour involved in the gorgeous, and very expensive, silk costume, close inspection reveals long, quick brush strokes. The turning pose and low viewpoint are found in other portraits by Hals and here allow emphasis on the embroidered sleeve and lace cuff. There are many emblems in the embroidery: signifying "the pleasures and pains of love" are "bees, arrows, flaming cornucopiae, lovers' knots and tongues of fire", while an obelisk or pyramid signifies strength and Mercury's cap and caduceus fortune.

In general, commissioned portraits such as this rarely showed adults smiling until the late 18th century, though smiling is often seen in tronies and figures in genre painting. But Hals is an exception to the general rule and often showed sitters with broader smiles than here, and in informal poses that bring an impression of movement and spontaneity to his work.

The effect of the eyes appearing to follow the viewer from every angle is a result of the subject being depicted as looking directly forward, toward the artist's point of view, combined with being a static two dimensional representation of this from whichever angle the painting itself is viewed.

== History ==
The painting's provenance only goes back to a sale in The Hague in 1770; after further Dutch sales it was bought by the Franco-Swiss banker and collector the Comte de Pourtalès-Gorgier in 1822. After his death the painting was acquired at the auction of his collection in Paris in 1865 by Richard Seymour-Conway, 4th Marquess of Hertford, who outbid Baron James de Rothschild at more than six times the sales estimate. It was in Hertford's Paris home in 1871, listed as portrait d'un homme ("portrait of a man"), and then brought to London, probably for the purpose of exhibiting it in a large and long loan exhibition of old master paintings at Bethnal Green, which was deliberately sited away from the West End of London to attract the working classes. The exhibition was a huge success and A Cavalier (the catalogue title) a particular hit with both public and the critics; it played a considerable part in raising the critical estimation of Hals in England.

By 1888, when it was again exhibited at the Royal Academy, it had become Laughing Cavalier, though a cleaning in the intervening period (in 1884) may have changed the effect. The critic in the Athenaeum noted a brighter appearance, but also that "The man smiles rather than laughs". Hertford's collection was bequeathed to his natural son Sir Richard Wallace Bt., whose widow donated it and his London house to the nation as the Wallace Collection. It was included in the 2021 exhibition 'Frans Hals—The Male Portrait', held at the Wallace Collection, and was on display at the 2023 and 2024 'Frans Hals' exhibition held at the National Gallery and the Rijksmuseum; the latter venue being the first time the painting had been on loan to an exhibition.

The "eyes following you round the room" trope has long been a stand-by in British comedy, used by Pete and Dud in The Art Gallery, among many others, sometimes in the form of a portrait with cut-away eyes that can be used as a peephole.

== Derivatives ==
The Laughing Cavalier is used by McEwan's beer as its logo. It has been modified showing the Laughing Cavalier enjoying the beer.

In the Scarlet Pimpernel adventure series by Emma Orczy, The Laughing Cavalier is a prequel recounting the story of the supposed subject of the painting, who is an ancestor of her main hero, the Scarlet Pimpernel, Sir Percy Blakeney.

The Laughing Cavalier features in "The Case of the Mirror of Portugal", episode six of the TV series The Rivals of Sherlock Holmes.

Television series The Monkees features an episode (S02E05) that revolves around the painting and a modified copy as a plot device.

A small copy of the Laughing Cavalier can be seen hanging on a wall in the Harris home in the 1959 murder mystery film Sapphire (40 mins).

== See also ==
- List of paintings by Frans Hals
