= The First Sir Percy =

1920 novel by Baroness Orczy

- American first edition, 1921
- Author: Baroness Orczy
- Illustrator: Leo Bates
- Language: English
- Genre: Adventure, Historical
- Publisher: Hodder & Stoughton
- Publication date: 1920
- Publication place: United Kingdom
- Media type: Print (hardback & paperback)
- Pages: 319 pp
- Preceded by: The Laughing Cavalier
- Followed by: The Scarlet Pimpernel

The First Sir Percy: An Adventure of the Laughing Cavalier is a 1920 adventure novel by Baroness Orczy featuring Sir Percy Blakeney, ancestor of Orczy's character The Scarlet Pimpernel. It is a direct sequel to The Laughing Cavalier, occurring a few months after the events in the first book.

== Background ==
The First Sir Percy is a direct sequel to The Laughing Cavalier (1914) and, like that earlier book, is set not during the French Revolution but in the early 17th century. The action takes place in 1624 in the Dutch Republic and follows the soldier of fortune known as "Diogenes" and his companions "Socrates" and "Pythagoras", whom Orczy presents as ancestors of her best-known character, the Scarlet Pimpernel. Against the background of the Eighty Years' War, the plot draws on the political intrigue of the period, including the position of the stadtholder Maurice, Prince of Orange.

== Plot summary ==
It is March 1624 in Holland. Two months earlier, a mercenary/adventurer who calls himself "Diogenes" foiled the plot on the life of the Stadtholder. Now, he has finally met his real father, an English nobleman, and realized his true identity as Sir Percy Blake of Blakeney, heir to a large estate in Sussex. He will soon marry Gilda Beresteyn, the woman he was paid to kidnap in January.

Blakeney has invited his friends from his mercenary days, "Socrates" and "Pythagoras," to the wedding. However, while traveling there, Pythagoras runs afoul of Lord Stoutenburg (now a fugitive for his plot to kill the Stadtholder). Stoutenburg recognizes Pythagoras, gets him drunk, and has his servant Jan shoot him in the back and leave him for dead.

On the day of the wedding, Diogenes is concerned when Pythagoras does not show up. Socrates and a group of men go out to look for him. Just as the celebration is ending, Socrates returns with the wounded Pythagoras. After being given medical treatment, Pythagoras reveals that Stoutenburg has a new plan to assassinate the Stadtholder, namely, the Archduchess Isabella has troops crossing the IJssel and coming up from Kleve. They plan to seize the cities of Arnhem and Nijmegen, then march across the Veluwe and confront the Stadtholder with a vast army. On top of this, Stoutenburg is plotting to poison the Stadtholder using chemicals he has been taught to manufacture by Francis Borgia.

The Stadtholder asks Diogenes to fight at his side. Diogenes is torn between his feelings for his new bride and the call of honour and duty. Gilda settles the matter when she brings him his sword, telling him he must leave for Vorden within the hour.

Gilda's brother, Nicholaes, travels with Diogenes as far as Barneveld but on returning home, he tries to convince Gilda that her husband is a traitor and is in league with the Archduchess.

In Vorden, Diogenes delivers the Stadtholder's orders to Messire Marquet and his troops. En route to Wageningen, he is suddenly chased and shot at by men on horses. Plunging into the river IJseel to evade his attackers, his horse is shot through the neck and the waters sweep over his head.

Four days pass and there is no news from Diogenes. The archduchess's troops have crossed the IJseel and overrun Gelderland. Nicholaes has been sent to Amersfoot to tell his father of the Stadtholder's coming and that they must evacuate the town. Fugitives from Ede have reached the Stadtholder's camp at Utrecht and it soon becomes obvious that Diogenes has failed to deliver orders to Messire Marquet and Mynheer De Keysere.

Gilda is worried, but refuses to believe her husband can have failed. She watches for him from the window and eventually spots him riding into the city. On hearing the news, Nicholaes exclaims that Diogenes' return is impossible but won't say any more when questioned. He then tries to get the Stadtholder away before he can talk to Diogenes, insisting that Diogenes is in league with the Archduchess. When Diogenes, weary and dazed, arrives, Nicholaes attacks him with cries of "Assassin!" but Gilda stops the fight.

Diogenes, Pythagoras, and Socrates follow Nicholaes and manage to frustrate his plans to deliver the Stadtholder into the hands of the Archduchess. However, before the traitorous Nicholaes meets up with Lord Stoutenburg, he shoots at Diogenes with a poisoned bullet and the resultant smoke causes him to go blind.

Nicolaes and Stoutenburg return to Amersfoort with 4000 mercenaries and demand the surrender of the city. Stoutenburg threatens to kill everyone there unless Gilda agrees to marry him. A commotion outside the house reveals a blind Diogenes is back and is entertaining the troops.

Stoutenburg is determined to hang his nemesis Diogenes, and thinks that Gilda will prefer a strong masterful man to a weak helpless one. The sad condition of her husband only seems to make Gilda more committed to him, so changing tack, Stoutenburg promises Gilda he will only spare Diogenes' life if she will agree to be his wife. She reluctantly agrees, but once she has gone to her room, Stoutenburg tells Jan to hang him anyway.

Faced with the gallows, Diogenes barters his knowledge of the Stadtholder's plans for a mug of port. Stoutenburg then tells Gilda's father that his son-in-law is a traitor, and knowing the man's views on such behaviour, leaves him alone in the dining hall with Diogenes and a loaded gun. A gunshot is heard from outside the room, and the Stadtholder leaves, locking the door behind him.
