= Groeneveld =

Groeneveld ("green field" in the Dutch language) may refer to:

- Groeneveld, South Holland, a former municipality
- Groeneveld (elm hybrid)
- Groeneveld (estate), a former Dutch colonial estate in Jakarta.
- Groeneveld (surname)
- 1674 Groeneveld, an asteroid, named after Ingrid Groeneveld
- Groeneveld Castle, a castle in Baarn, Utrecht, Netherlands
