= Hoog en Woud Harnasch =

Former Dutch municipality

Coordinates: 52.002981°N 4.31767°E

Coats of arms for the municipality of Hoog- en Woud-Harnasch

Hoog en Woud Harnasch is a former municipality in the Dutch province of South Holland. It was located to the west of the city of Delft.

The municipality existed between 1817 and 1833, when it became part of Hof van Delft.
