= Sara Groenevelt =

American litterateur and classical musician

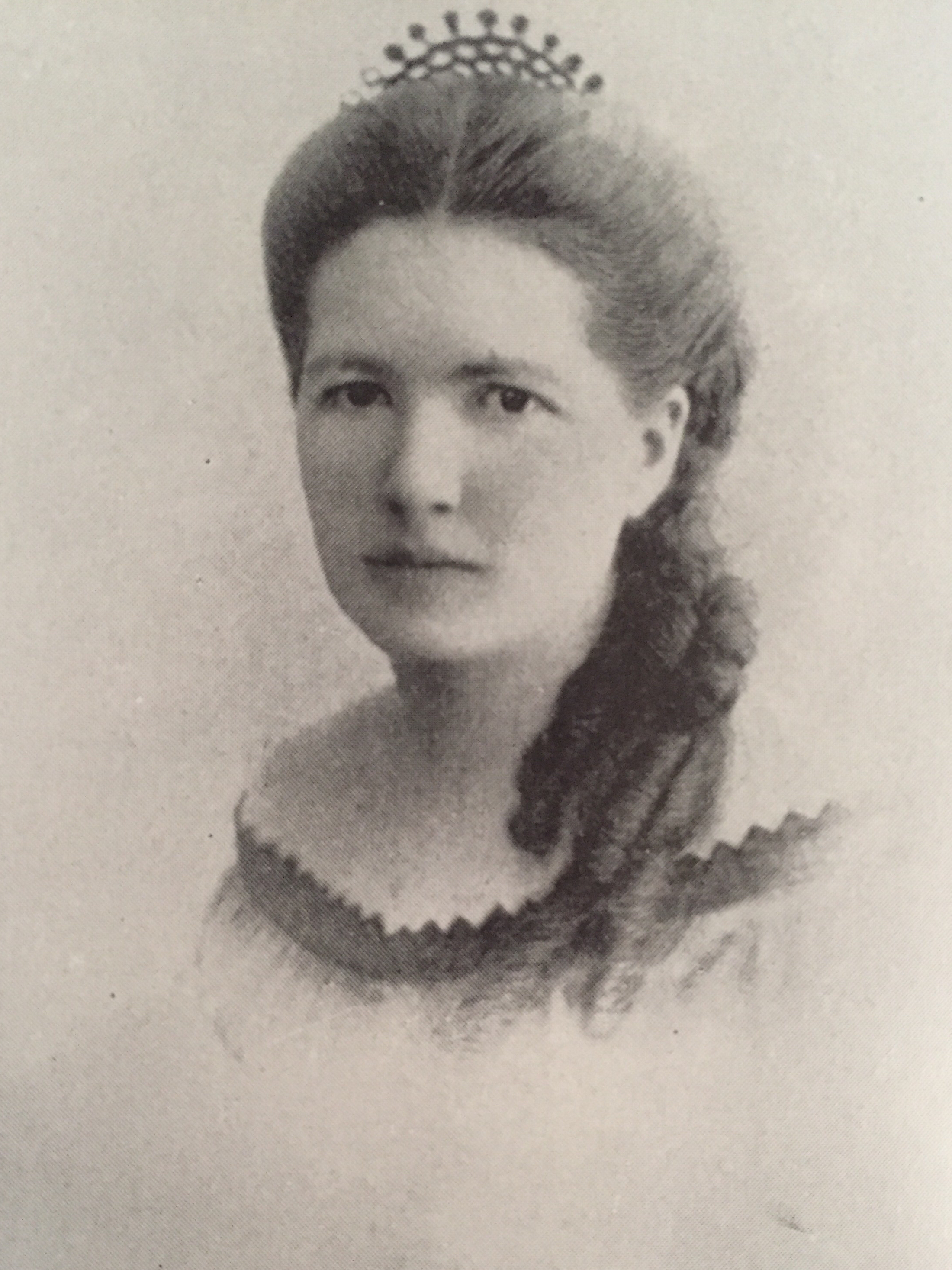

Background information
- Died: October 31, 1899
- Occupation: Writer

Sara M. Groenevelt (died October 31, 1899) was a litterateur and classical musician. Both her daughters became professional musicians as well.

== Early life ==
Sara Groenevelt was born on the "Bon Dieu", a cotton plantation of her uncle, F. G. Bartlett, which was romantically situated on a bend of the Red river called Bon Dieu, near Natchitoches, Louisiana. She was the daughter of Dr. Sylvanus Bartlett, of Maine, and Julia Finch Gresham, of Kentucky. Groenevelt was a cousin of Ben Washington, the journalist "Perley Poore".

At the age of fifteen she graduated from the girl's high school of New Orleans.

== Career ==
She was the only lady solo-player at the Haupt-Prufung of the Leipzig Conservatory of Music, held in the Gewandhaus in May 1867, where she played with success the Moscheles Concerto for piano, accompanied by the famous Leipzig Gewandhaus Orchestra, Moscheles himself leading.

Groenevelt wrote under various pen-names, and her poems have received recognition from the Louisiana Times-Democrat, and also from the Chicago Current, for which latter she wrote under the pen-name "Stanley M. Bartlett."

She is the author of Otille the Octoroone; Tragedy in Five Acts

== Personal life ==
A few years after graduation, she became the wife of Professor Eduard/Edward F. Groenevelt, Jr. (born June 6, 1827, died May 29, 1899), a descendant of an old Dutch noble, Baron Arnold de Groenevelt, of Netherland fame. They had four children: Edward Groenevelt, Jr.; Celeste Groenevelt, an eminent artist and performer on the piano, who lived in Berlin; one son, the eldest, chose medicine and surgery as a profession and was connected with the United States Marine Corps hospital service; he was detailed in the quarantine station at Chandeleur Islands and there contracted fever from which he died; Grace Groenevelt, one of the most expert violinists in Europe, died a few months after her father and a few months before her mother. Shortly after her marriage she accompanied her husband to Europe, where she spent several years, completing her musical education under the careful guidance of Ignaz Moscheles, Carl Reinecke and other masters.

She died on October 31, 1899, in Berlin, of typhoid fever and is buried at Lafayette Cemetery Number 1, New Orleans, Louisiana.
