= Willem Groenewald =

Namibian cricketer (born 1990)

Personal information
- Full name: Willem Johannes Groenewald
- Born: 27 June 1990 (age 36)
- Batting: Right-handed
- Bowling: Right-arm off break

International information
- National side: Namibia

Domestic team information
- Years: Team
- 2009/10–2011/12: Namibia

Career statistics
Competition	FC	LA	T20
Matches	11	13	7
Runs scored	189	102	2
Batting average	9.45	14.57	–
100s/50s	0/0	0/0	0/0
Top score	33	44	2*
Balls bowled	446	358	42
Wickets	6	5	0
Bowling average	55.00	60.40	–
5 wickets in innings	0	0	–
10 wickets in match	0	0	–
Best bowling	2/26	1/18	–
Catches/stumpings	4/–	4/–	1/–
- Source: CricketArchive, 16 October 2011

Willem Groeneveld (born 27 June 1990) is a Namibian former cricketer. He is a right-handed batsman and right-arm off-break bowler.

Groeneveld made his first-class debut for the side during the 2009-10 CSA Provincial Three-Day Challenge, against Griqualand West in October 2009. In the first innings in which he batted, he scored 5 runs.
