= The Scarlet Pimpernel =

1905 novel by Emma Orczy

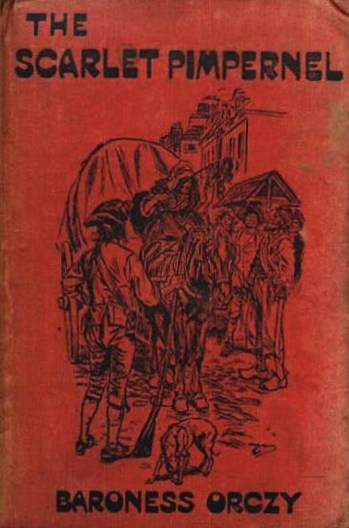
- 1908 edition
- Author: Baroness Orczy
- Language: English
- Genre: Historical fiction, adventure fiction
- Set in: 1792, during the early stages of the French Revolution
- Publisher: Greening
- Publication date: 1905
- Publication place: United Kingdom
- Pages: 319
- Preceded by: The First Sir Percy
- Followed by: Sir Percy Leads the Band

The Scarlet Pimpernel is the first novel in a series of historical fiction novels by British author Baroness Orczy, published in 1905. It was written after her stage play of the same title (co-authored with her husband Montagu Barstow) enjoyed a long run in London, having opened in Nottingham in 1903.

The novel is set during the Reign of Terror following the start of the French Revolution. The title is the nom de guerre of its hero and protagonist, a chivalrous Englishman who rescues aristocrats before they are sent to the guillotine. Sir Percy Blakeney leads a double life: apparently nothing more than a wealthy fop, but in reality, a formidable swordsman and a quick-thinking master of disguise and escape artist. The band of gentlemen who assist him are the only ones who know of his secret identity. He is known by his symbol, a simple flower, the scarlet pimpernel (Anagallis arvensis).

Opening at the New Theatre in London's West End on 5 January 1905, the play became a favourite of British audiences, eventually playing more than 2,000 performances and becoming one of the most popular shows staged in London. Published after the success of the play, the novel was an immediate success, gaining Orczy a following of readers in Britain and the rest of the world. The stage play and subsequent novel, with their hero and villain, were so popular that they inspired a revival of classic villainy at the time.

Orczy's premise of a daring hero who cultivates a secret identity disguised by a meek or ineffectual manner proved enduring. Doctor Syn, Zorro, the Shadow, the Spider, the Green Hornet, the Phantom, Superman and Batman followed within a few decades, and the trope remains a popular one in serial fiction today. Marvel Comics co-creator Stan Lee, who had read Scarlet Pimpernel stories as a child, said that their protagonist was "the first character who could be called a superhero."

== Plot ==
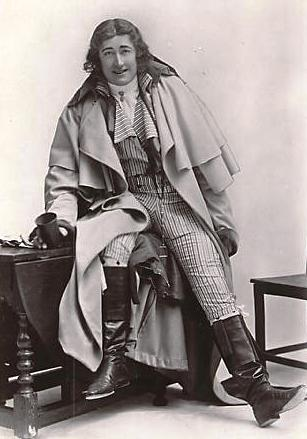
Fred Terry as Sir Percy Blakeney/The Scarlet Pimpernel in the 1905 West End theatre production

In 1792, an early stage of the French Revolution, Marguerite St. Just, a beautiful French actress, is married to wealthy English fop Sir Percy Blakeney, baronet. Before their marriage Marguerite took revenge upon the Marquis de St. Cyr, who had ordered her beloved brother Armand beaten for his romantic interest in the Marquis' daughter, with the unintended consequence that the Marquis and his sons were guillotined. When Percy found out, he became estranged from his wife. Marguerite, for her part, became disillusioned with Percy's shallow, dandyish lifestyle.

Meanwhile, the "League of the Scarlet Pimpernel", a secret society of twenty English aristocrats, "one to command, and nineteen to obey", is engaged in rescuing their French counterparts from the daily executions of the Reign of Terror. Their leader, the mysterious Scarlet Pimpernel, takes his nom de guerre from the small, red wayside flower he draws on his messages. Despite being the talk of London society, only his followers and possibly the Prince of Wales know the Pimpernel's true identity. Like many others, Marguerite is entranced by the Pimpernel's daring exploits.

We seek him here, we seek him there,
Those Frenchies seek him everywhere.
Is he in heaven?—Is he in hell?
That demmed, elusive Pimpernel.

— Sir Percy Blakeney, Baronet (ch.12)

At a ball attended by the Blakeneys, Percy's verse about the "elusive Pimpernel" becomes an instant success. But Marguerite is blackmailed by Citizen Chauvelin, the wily new French envoy to England: Chauvelin's agents have stolen a letter proving that Armand is in league with the Pimpernel. Chauvelin offers to trade Armand's life for her help against the Pimpernel. Contemptuous of her seemingly witless and unloving husband, Marguerite does not go to him for help or advice. Instead, she passes along information which enables Chauvelin to learn the Pimpernel's true identity.

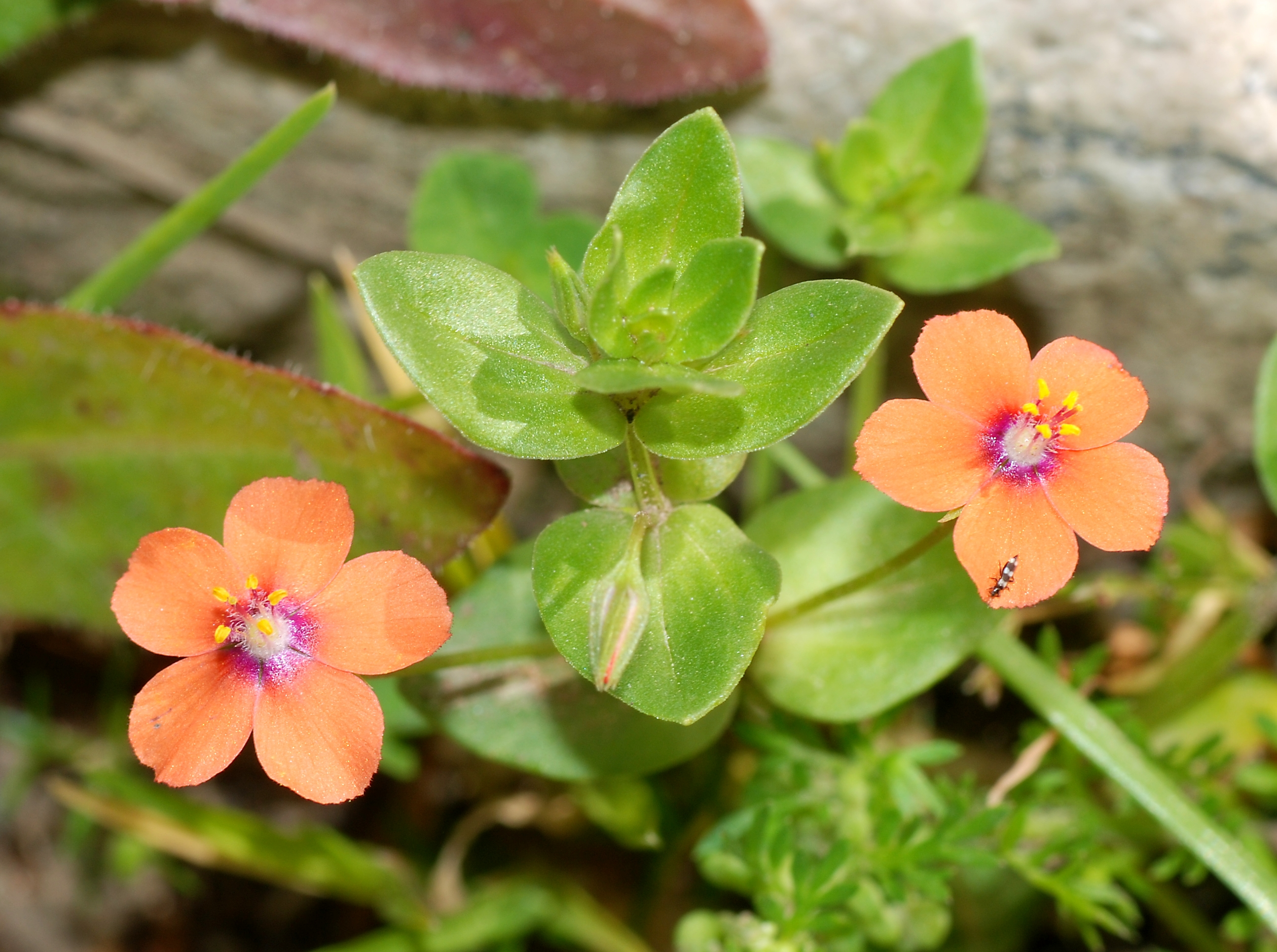
A scarlet pimpernel (Anagallis arvensis), which the eponymous hero leaves behind after his interventions

Later that night, Marguerite finally tells her husband of the terrible danger threatening her brother and pleads for his help. Percy promises to save him. After Percy unexpectedly leaves for France, Marguerite discovers to her horror (and simultaneous delight) that he is the Pimpernel. He had hidden behind the persona of a dull, slow-witted fop to deceive the world. He had not told Marguerite because of his worry that she might betray him, as she had the Marquis de St. Cyr. Desperate to save her husband, she decides to pursue Percy to France to warn him that Chauvelin knows his identity and his purpose. She persuades Sir Andrew Ffoulkes to accompany her, but because of the tide and the weather, neither they nor Chauvelin can leave immediately.

At Calais, Percy openly approaches Chauvelin in the Chat gris, a decrepit inn whose owner is in Percy's pay. Despite Chauvelin's best efforts, the Englishman escapes by offering Chauvelin a pinch of snuff, which turns out to be pure pepper. Through a bold plan executed right under Chauvelin's nose, Percy rescues Marguerite's brother Armand and the Comte de Tournay, the father of a schoolfriend of Marguerite's. Marguerite pursues Percy right to the very end, determined to either warn him or share his fate. Percy, heavily disguised, is captured by Chauvelin, who does not recognise him, so he is able to escape.

With Marguerite's love and courage amply proven, Percy's ardour is rekindled. Safely back on board their schooner, the Day Dream, the happily reconciled couple returns to England. Soon after, Sir Andrew Ffoulkes marries Suzanne, the Comte de Tournay's daughter.

== Characters ==
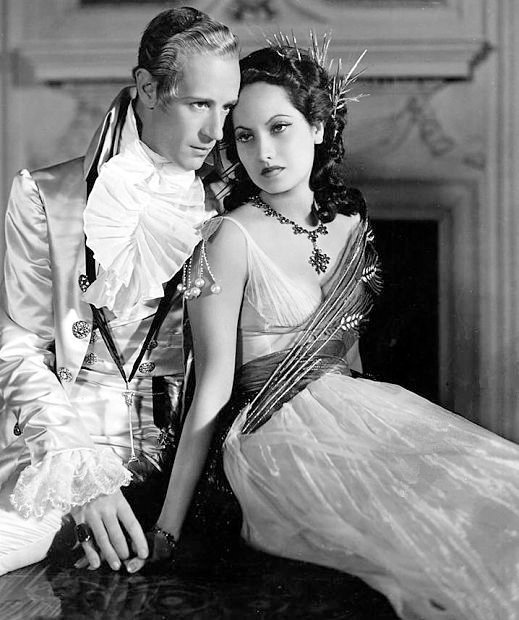
Leslie Howard as Sir Percy Blakeney with Merle Oberon as Lady Blakeney in The Scarlet Pimpernel (1934)

- Sir Percy Blakeney: He is a wealthy English baronet who rescues individuals sentenced to death by the guillotine. He soon reveals himself to be a master of disguise, an imaginative planner, a formidable swordsman and a quick-thinking escape artist. With each rescue he taunts his enemies by leaving behind a card showing a small flower—a scarlet pimpernel. The identity of the Scarlet Pimpernel thus becomes a topic of widespread popular interest and the hero himself becomes the subject of an international manhunt by the French revolutionary authorities. To hide his true identity, Sir Percy presents himself in everyday life as a dim-witted, foppish playboy. His secret is kept by a band of friends known as the League of the Scarlet Pimpernel. The league operates as an undercover team in enacting Sir Percy's rescue plans.
- Marguerite Blakeney, née St Just: She is married to Sir Percy. She leads London society with her beauty, style and intelligence. She was an actress in Paris, where she held salons to discuss the issues of the day. She was not an aristocrat in French society.
- Armand St Just: Older brother of Marguerite, who raised her after their parents died. He is a gentleman and a republican in France, but his views of the slaughter of the aristocracy do not match the times.
- Citizen Chauvelin: Newly appointed envoy to England from Revolutionary France. He seeks the Scarlet Pimpernel, who is allowing aristocrats to escape their fate under the new regime.
- Sir Andrew Ffoulkes: Friend of Sir Percy who aids Marguerite when she realizes her mistake. He falls in love with an émigrée, a girl who had been at school with Marguerite.
- Suzanne: Daughter of Comte de Tournay, also a friend of Marguerite's; she is the love interest of Sir Andrew Ffoulkes.

== Literary significance ==
"Orczy introduced a new idea into the collective consciousness: a heroic figure who creates a lounging foppish alter ego to hide his (or her) true heroic nature."

— Peter Royston.

The title character, Sir Percy Blakeney, a wealthy English fop who transforms into a formidable swordsman and a quick-thinking escape artist, established the "hero with a secret identity" in popular culture, a trope that would be seen in subsequent literary creations such as Don Diego de la Vega (Zorro), Kent Allard/Lamont Cranston (The Shadow), Clark Kent (Superman), and Bruce Wayne (Batman). The Scarlet Pimpernel exhibits characteristics that would become standard superhero conventions, including the penchant for disguise, use of a signature weapon (sword), ability to out-think and outwit his adversaries, and a calling card (he leaves behind a scarlet pimpernel at each of his interventions). By drawing attention to his alter ego, Blakeney hides behind his public face as a slow-thinking, foppish playboy, and he also establishes a network of supporters, The League of the Scarlet Pimpernel, that aids his endeavours. A plot technique from Pimpernel also used by some superheroes is the spurious "love triangle", where a woman is torn between attraction to her staid husband and the dashing hero—although they are in reality the same man. Marvel co-creator Stan Lee stated, "The Scarlet Pimpernel was the first superhero I had read about, the first character who could be called a superhero."

The popular success of the novel is considered to be based on the myth of the aristocratic hero with a double life, along with the love story and conflict of loyalties. Dugan says that "Behind the wigs and Mechlin lace cuffs lies an enduring human story of love, misunderstandings, conflict of loyalties, audacious bravery – and a dramatic double life." and this is a major part of the story's enduring popularity. Another aspect is the "Englishness" of the hero in the era when the British Empire began to shrink.

== Historical allusions ==
As a writer, Orczy often alluded to historical events and figures but adapted these freely in creating her tales.

Citizen Chauvelin, the recurring villain of the Scarlet Pimpernel series, is based to some extent on the real-life Bernard-François, marquis de Chauvelin, who survived the Revolutionary period to serve as an official under Napoleon. He was a noted liberal Deputy under the Bourbon Restoration.

Other historical figures who appear in Orczy's Pimpernel series include:

- Maximilien Robespierre
- Louis Antoine de Saint-Just
- Jean-Lambert Tallien
- Thérésa Tallien
- Georges Danton
- François Chabot
- Fabre d'Églantine
- The Prince of Wales (later, King George IV)
- Claude Basire
- Jean, Baron de Batz
- Jean-Paul Marat
- Paul Barras
- Georges Couthon
- Bertrand Barère
- Éléonore Duplay
- Collot d'Herbois

== Publishing history ==
=== Initial publication ===
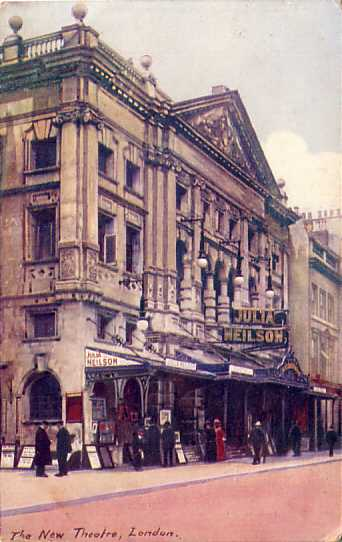
Postcard of the West End's New Theatre in 1905 with signs for Julia Neilson (who played Lady Blakeney) in The Scarlet Pimpernel

Orczy wrote the original manuscript for The Scarlet Pimpernel in five weeks during what she described as "The happiest time of her life". It was rejected by most publishing houses in London, despite her previous successes with her armchair detective stories, primarily The Old Man in the Corner which first appeared in The Royal Magazine in 1901 in a series of six "Mysteries of London". Eventually a friend put Orczy in contact with the actors Fred Terry and Julia Neilson who wanted a new romantic drama. The Scarlet Pimpernel was produced and adapted by Neilson and Terry and the play opened on 15 October 1903 at Nottingham's Theatre Royal, but it was not a success. Terry, however, had confidence in the play and, with a rewritten last act, took it to London's West End where it opened at the New Theatre on 5 January 1905. The premiere of the London production was enthusiastically received by the audience, but critics considered the play "old-fashioned". In spite of negative reviews, the play became a popular success, running 122 performances and enjoying numerous revivals. The Scarlet Pimpernel became a favourite of London audiences, playing more than 2,000 performances and becoming one of the most popular shows staged in the United Kingdom. The stage play (and subsequent novel), with their hero and villain, were so popular that they inspired a revival of classic villainy at the time.

The novel The Scarlet Pimpernel was published two years after the play opened and was an immediate success. Orczy gained a following of readers in Britain and throughout the world. The popularity of the novel encouraged her to write a number of sequels for her "reckless daredevil" over the next 35 years. The play was performed to great acclaim in France, Italy, Germany and Spain, while the novel was popular across the former British Empire and translated into 16 languages. Subsequently, the story has been adapted for television, film, a musical and other media.

The commercial success of The Scarlet Pimpernel allowed Orczy and her husband to live out their lives in luxury. Over the years, they lived on an estate in Kent, a bustling London home and an opulent villa in Monte Carlo. Conceiving the character while standing on a platform on the London Underground, Orczy wrote in her autobiography, Links in the Chain of Life:

I have so often been asked the question: "But how did you come to think of The Scarlet Pimpernel?" And my answer has always been: "It was God's will that I should." And to you moderns, who perhaps do not believe as I do, I will say, "In the chain of my life, there were so many links, all of which tended towards bringing me to the fulfillment of my destiny."

=== Sequels ===
Orczy wrote numerous sequels, none of which became as famous as The Scarlet Pimpernel. Many of the sequels revolve around French characters whom Sir Percy has met and is attempting to rescue. His followers, such as Lord Tony Dewhurst, Sir Andrew Ffoulkes, Lord Hastings, and Armand St. Just (Marguerite's brother), also take their turn in major roles.

In addition to the direct sequels about Sir Percy and his league, Orczy's related books include The Laughing Cavalier (1914) and The First Sir Percy (1921), about an ancestor of the Pimpernel; Pimpernel and Rosemary (1924), about a descendant; and The Scarlet Pimpernel Looks at the World (1933), a depiction of the 1930s world from the point of view of Sir Percy.

Some of her non-related Revolutionary-period novels reference the Scarlet Pimpernel or the League, most notably The Bronze Eagle (1915).

=== Novels ===
- The Scarlet Pimpernel (1905)
- I Will Repay (1906)
- The Elusive Pimpernel (1908)
- Eldorado (1913)
- Lord Tony's Wife (1917)
- The Triumph of the Scarlet Pimpernel (1922)
- Sir Percy Hits Back (1927)
- A Child of the Revolution (1932)
- The Way of the Scarlet Pimpernel (1933)
- Sir Percy Leads the Band (1936)
- Mam'zelle Guillotine (1940)

=== Collections of short stories ===
- The League of the Scarlet Pimpernel (1919)
- Adventures of the Scarlet Pimpernel (1929)

=== Omnibus editions ===
- The Scarlet Pimpernel etc. (1930) collection of four novels
- The Gallant Pimpernel (1939) collection of four novels
- The Scarlet Pimpernel Omnibus (1952) collection of four novels

=== Related books ===
- The Laughing Cavalier (1913) (about an ancestor of the Scarlet Pimpernel)
- The First Sir Percy (1920) (about an ancestor of the Scarlet Pimpernel)
- Pimpernel and Rosemary (1924) (about a descendant of the Scarlet Pimpernel)
- The Scarlet Pimpernel Looks at the World (1933) (Sir Percy viewing the world in the 1930s)

== Members of the League ==
The Life and Exploits of the Scarlet Pimpernel, a fictional biography of Percy Blakeney published in 1938, named the nineteen members of the League of the Scarlet Pimpernel.

- The original nine league or founder members who formed the party on 2 August 1792: Sir Andrew Ffoulkes (second in command), Lord Anthony Dewhurst, Lord Edward Hastings, Lord John Bathurst, Lord Stowmarries, Sir Edward Mackenzie, Sir Philip Glynde, Lord Saint Denys, and Sir Richard Galveston.
- Ten members enrolled in January 1793: Sir Jeremiah Wallescourt, Lord Kulmstead, Lord George Fanshawe, Anthony Holte, John Hastings (Lord Edward's cousin), Lord Everingham, Sir George Vigor, Bart., The Honorable St. John Devinne, Michael Barstow of York and Armand St. Just (Marguerite's brother).

Three members of the League have betrayed their oath of loyalty:

- In the short story "The Traitor" in The League of the Scarlet Pimpernel, in November 1793 while accompanying the League on a mission to rescue "some women of the late unfortunate Marie Antoinette's household: maids and faithful servants, ruthlessly condemned to die for their tender adherence to a martyred queen", Lord Kulmstead seduces a young girl into helping set a trap for the Scarlet Pimpernel, but the Pimpernel escapes and an unrepentant Kulmstead is captured and sent to Paris (presumably for trial and execution). In the radio series episode "The Traitor" (30 November 1952), Kulmstead is attempting to betray the League when he is shot and killed by League member Robert Kent.
- St. John Devinne's betrayal of Sir Percy forms an important part of the novel Sir Percy Leads the Band, but Devinne later regrets and repents his actions, and his treachery is forgiven by Sir Percy. While his treachery is never revealed to the other members of the League, it is hinted that to regain his lost honor he will join the British Army when England and France finally declare war.
- In the novel Eldorado, Armand St. Just betrays Sir Percy to Chauvelin in order to save the life of Jeanne L'Ange, with whom he has fallen in love, not knowing that Sir Percy has already rescued her and transported her to safety. Like Devinne, Armand is tormented by what he has done, but Sir Percy also forgives him.

Marguerite, Lady Blakeney, is also named as a member of the League in the book Mam'zelle Guillotine, but it is not known when she was formally enrolled. The Prince Regent is rumored to also be a member of the League, but in the original novel he refuses to confirm or deny this, saying "My lips are sealed!"; in the novel The Elusive Pimpernel, Sir Percy tells Marguerite that he has had to report to the Prince before joining her at the village gala.

== Chronology of novels in the series ==
Orczy did not publish her Pimpernel stories as a strict chronological series, and in fact, the settings of the books in their publication sequence may vary forward or backward in time by months or centuries. While some readers enjoy following the author's development of the Pimpernel character as it was realised, others prefer to read the stories in historical sequence. Taking into account occasional discrepancies in the dates of events (real and fictional) referred to in the stories, the following is an approximate chronological listing of Orczy's Scarlet Pimpernel novels and short stories:

Book Title	Setting	Published	Notes
The Laughing Cavalier	January 1624	1914	
The First Sir Percy	March 1624	1921	
The Scarlet Pimpernel	September–October 1792	1905	
Sir Percy Leads the Band	January 1793	1936	
Adventures of the Scarlet Pimpernel	1793	1929	each short story is set in a different month of 1793.
The League of the Scarlet Pimpernel	July 1793	1919	
A Child of the Revolution	July 1793–July 1794	1932	
I Will Repay	August–September 1793	1906	
The Elusive Pimpernel	September–October 1793	1908	
Lord Tony's Wife	November–December 1793	1917	
The Way of the Scarlet Pimpernel	late 1793	1933	concurrent with preceding 2 or 3 novels
Eldorado	January 1794	1913	
Mam'zelle Guillotine	January 1794	1940	concurrent with Eldorado
The Triumph of the Scarlet Pimpernel	April–July 1794	1922	
Sir Percy Hits Back	May–June 1794	1927	
In the Rue Monge (short story)	1790s	1931	unknown when set as no dates are mentioned
Pimpernel and Rosemary	1922–1924	1924	

== Adaptations ==
Hollywood took to the Pimpernel early and often, although most of the Pimpernel movies have been based on a melange of the original book and another Orczy novel, Eldorado. The best known of the Pimpernel movies is the 1934 The Scarlet Pimpernel starring Leslie Howard, which is often considered the definitive portrayal and adaptation.

=== Films ===
In 1923, Fred Terry and Julia Nelson bought the sole performance right to a stageplay based on The Scarlet Pimpernel. Orczy sued the two in an attempt to claim a separate right of performance for films, but was unsuccessful. As a result of the case, people who controlled a stage performance right under the English Copyright Act were entitled to create films with the same right.

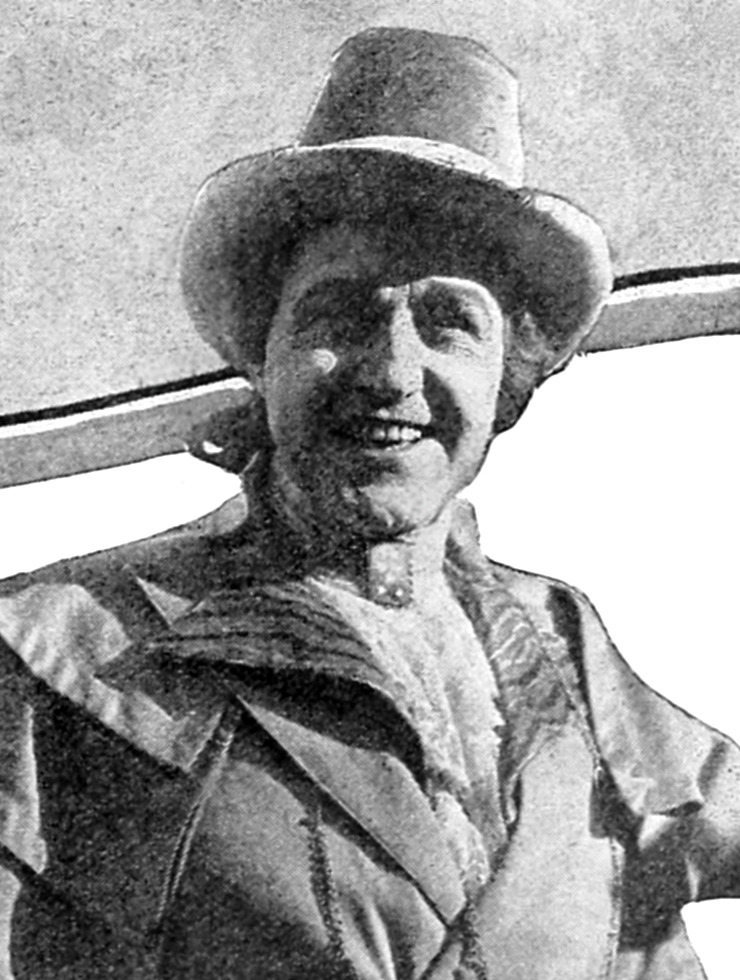
Dustin Farnum in The Scarlet Pimpernel (1917)

- The Scarlet Pimpernel (1917; silent) starring Dustin Farnum, Winifred Kingston and William Burress
- The Elusive Pimpernel (1919; silent) starring Cecil Humphreys, Maire Blanche and Norman Page
- I Will Repay (1923; silent) starring Holmes Herbert
- The Triumph of the Scarlet Pimpernel (1928) starring Matheson Lang
- The Scarlet Pimpernel (1934) starring Leslie Howard, Merle Oberon and Raymond Massey
- The Return of the Scarlet Pimpernel (1937) starring Barry K. Barnes, Sophie Stewart and Francis Lister
- The Elusive Pimpernel (1950), a.k.a. The Fighting Pimpernel in the US, starring David Niven, Margaret Leighton and Cyril Cusack

=== Stage ===
- The Scarlet Pimpernel (1903), a play co-written by Baroness Orczy and Montague Barstow; produced in England, opening in Nottingham in 1903, then moving to London; revived ten times between 1905 and 1985
- The Scarlet Pimpernel (1910), Broadway production of the Orczy/Barstow play; ran for only 40 performances
- The Scarlet Pimpernel (1997), a Broadway musical composed by Frank Wildhorn and written by Nan Knighton; the production starred Douglas Sills as Sir Percy, Christine Andreas as Marguerite and Terrence Mann as Chauvelin
- The Scarlet Pimpernel (2008), a Broadway-style Japanese adaptation, performed by the popular all-women's Takarazuka Revue in Hyogo and Tokyo, Japan
- The Scarlet Pimpernel (2011), Cawthra Park High School of the Performing Arts, Mississauga, Ontario.
- The Scarlet Pimpernel (2016), the Broadway 1997 version translated into Japanese, performed by Umeda Art's Theatre in Osaka and Tokyo, Japan

=== Television ===
- BBC Sunday Night Theatre – three performances, in 1951, 1952 and 1953, based on the stage play co-written by Baroness Orczy and Montague Barstow
  - Season 1 episode 6, 5 February 1950 starring James Carney as Sir Percy, Sydney Tafler as Chauvelin and Margaretta Scott as Marguerite
  - Season 2 episode, 2 14 January 1951 starring James Carney as Sir Percy, Terence de Marney as Chauvelin and Margaretta Scott as Marguerite
  - Season 6 episode 38, 18 September 1955 starring Tony Britton as Sir Percy, Douglas Wilmer as Chauvelin and Harriette Johns as Marguerite
- The Scarlet Pimpernel (1955–1956 British ITV television series) starring Marius Goring as Sir Percy, Stanley Van Beers as Chauvelin and Patrick Troughton as Sir Andrew
- DuPont Show of the Month Season 4 episode 4 ("The Scarlet Pimpernel"), 18 December 1960 starring Michael Rennie as Sir Percy, Maureen O'Hara as Marguerite and Reginald Denny as Chauvelin
- Den Røde Pimpernell (1968), Norwegian television series, broadcast by NRK
- The Elusive Pimpernel (1969), a ten-part BBC One serial starring Anton Rodgers as Sir Percy, Diane Fletcher as Marguerite and Bernard Hepton as Chauvelin
- The Scarlet Pimpernel (1982), starring Anthony Andrews as Sir Percy, Jane Seymour as Marguerite, and Ian McKellen as Chauvelin.
- The Scarlet Pimpernel, two TV series of three episodes each (1999, 2000). starring Richard E. Grant as Sir Percy and Martin Shaw as Chauvelin. Elizabeth McGovern starred as Marguerite in the first series; the character did not appear in the second.

=== Radio ===
- An adaptation of the 1934 film, featuring Leslie Howard in his original role and Olivia de Havilland as Marguerite, was produced in 1938 as part of the Lux Radio Theatre series.
- A radio series based on the novels starring Marius Goring as Blakeney was produced and syndicated 1952–53 on NBC under the direction of Harry Alan Towers through his Towers of London production company. This series did not include the character of Marguerite and promoted the character of Lord Antony "Tony" Dewhurst to Blakeney's second-in-command, while the novels' second-in-command, Sir Andrew Ffoulkes, became a lesser character.
- A two-part adaptation for BBC Radio 4 with James Purefoy as Sir Percy Blakeney was broadcast in December 2017.

== Parodies and media references ==
The novel has been parodied or used as source material in a variety of media, such as films, television, stage works, literature, and games:

- It was parodied as a 1950 Warner Bros. Cartoons animated short film featuring Daffy Duck, The Scarlet Pumpernickel. An action figure of the Scarlet Pumpernickel was released by DC Direct in 2006, making it one of the few—if not the only—toys produced based on the Pimpernel.
- In 1953, following Jack Kyle's performance for the Ireland national rugby union team against France in that year's Five Nations Championship, sportswriter Paul MacWeeney adapted lines from the work to salute Kyle.
- The Scarlet Pimpernel was parodied extensively in the Carry On film Don't Lose Your Head, which featured Sid James as the Black Fingernail, who helps French aristocrats escape the guillotine while hiding behind the foppish exterior of British aristocrat Sir Rodney Ffing. It also features Jim Dale as his assistant, Lord Darcy. They must rescue preposterously effete aristocrat Charles Hawtrey from the clutches of Kenneth Williams' fiendish Citizen Camembert and his sidekick Citizen Bidet (Peter Butterworth).
- The Kinks 1966 song "Dedicated Follower of Fashion" contains an allusion ("they seek him here, they seek him there") to a line from the book; these lyrics also appear in the 1993 film In the Name of the Father when Gerry Conlon (played by Daniel Day-Lewis) returns home to Belfast in hippie-style clothing that he got from London's Carnaby Street.
- In the third series of Blackadder, Blackadder the Third, the episode "Nob and Nobility" revolves around Blackadder's disgust with the English nobility's fascination for the Pimpernel. Tim McInnerny reprises a version of his "Lord Percy" character from the previous two series, who is the alter ego of the Pimpernel, who acts a bit like James Bond.
- In The Desert Song, the heroic "Red Shadow" has a milquetoast alter ego modelled after Sir Percy.
- The character was parodied in a lengthy comedy sketch on The Benny Hill Show (series 11, episode 1, 1980). Portrayed by Hill himself, the "Scarlet Pimple" spends just as much of his time unsuccessfully pursuing women as he does rescuing people. When one woman repeatedly shuns his advances, he leaves in a huff and refuses to rescue the next woman being sent to the guillotine.
- The Canadian comedy team of Wayne and Shuster created a comedy sketch in 1957 based on the Scarlet Pimpernel called "The Brown Pumpernickel", in which, instead of a red flower as his calling card, the hero would leave behind a loaf of pumpernickel.
- In The Huckleberry Hound Show episode "The Unmasked Avenger", Huckleberry Hound adopts the identity of the "Purple Pumpernickel". A parade of masked avenger characters at the top of the episode includes the real Scarlet Pimpernel. After the Purple Pumpernickel frees the populace from oppression, he unmasks and announces new building projects and social reforms to improve the lives of all, but which will require higher taxes. He is confronted by the Blue Bouncer, another masked avenger who regards the Purple Pumpernickel as the new oppressor of the people.
- In 1972, Burt Reynolds portrayed the "Lavender Pimpernel" in a season 5 episode of The Carol Burnett Show.
- Sir Percy and Marguerite are mentioned as members of an 18th-century incarnation of The League of Extraordinary Gentlemen in the graphic novels of that title by Alan Moore and Kevin O'Neill and make a more significant appearance in The Black Dossier, in the accounts of both Orlando and Fanny Hill, with whom Percy and Marguerite are revealed to have been romantically involved.
- A series of novels by Lauren Willig, beginning with The Secret History of the Pink Carnation (2005), chronicle the adventures of the Scarlet Pimpernel's associates, including the Purple Gentian (alias of Lord Richard Selwick), spies in the Napoleonic era.
- Steve Jackson Games published GURPS Scarlet Pimpernel, by Robert Traynor and Lisa Evans in 1991, a supplement for playing the milieu using the GURPS roleplaying game system.
- In "E-I-E-I-(Annoyed Grunt)", a 1999 episode of The Simpsons, the Scarlet Pimpernel appears as the antagonist in the fictional film The Poke of Zorro.
- The 2003 film Master and Commander: The Far Side of the World is set in 1805 and features a boy named Blakeney, whose father is named Sir Percy Blakeney, suggesting he is the son of the Scarlet Pimpernel.
- Writer Geoffrey Trease wrote his adventure novel Thunder of Valmy (1960; US title Victory at Valmy) partly as a response to Orczy's Pimpernel novels, which he argued were giving children a misleading image of the French Revolution. Thunder of Valmy revolves around the adventures of a peasant boy, Pierre Mercier, during the start of the Revolution, and his persecution by a tyrannical Marquis.
- Famed British barrister Sir Desmond Lorenz de Silva, QC, is often referred to by Fleet Street papers as "the Scarlet Pimpernel", because of his uncanny penchant for saving clients facing the death penalty outside the UK.
- Writer Diana Peterfreund took inspiration from the Scarlet Pimpernel for her book Across the Star Swept Sea. The main character, Persis Blake, pretends to be a shallow aristocrat while actually being the notorious spy "The Wild Poppy".
- In the 2014 videogame Assassin's Creed: Unity, protagonist Arno Dorian may encounter a man known as the "Crimson Rose", the leader of the "Crimson League", a royalist organization which saves aristocrats from the guillotine. However, it is later discovered that Crimson Rose is a Templar, and he and the League are wiped out by Arno.
- Dewey Lambdin includes an homage to the Scarlet Pimpernel in his book King, Ship, and Sword, in the character of a foppish Sir Pulteney Plumb who was known as "The Yellow Tansy".
- Philip José Farmer's Tarzan Alive: A Definitive Biography of Lord Greystoke includes the Scarlet Pimpernel as a member of the Wold Newton family. Farmer suggests that Sir Percy was present when the Wold Cottage meteorite fell near Wold Newton, Yorkshire, England, on 13 December 1795. Win Scott Eckert wrote two Wold Newton short stories featuring the Scarlet Pimpernel, both taking place in 1795: "Is He in Hell?" and "The Wild Huntsman." Eckert also constructed a "fictional genealogy" for the Pimpernel in his essay "The Blakeney Family Tree."
- In the Phineas and Ferb episode "Druselsteinoween", multiple characters dress as the Scarlet Pimpernel for a Halloween party in a castle. This is used for comedic effect as one of the Pimpernels uses the others as decoys to avoid his father, who disapproves of his son's girlfriend because she is the daughter of his sworn enemy.
- In the DuckTales episode "Friendship Hates Magic," the Scarlet Pimpernel is parodied as the Scarlet Pimperbill, whom Launchpad McQuack mistakes for Darkwing Duck due to the very similar design of the two characters.
- In the comic strip Doonesbury, the character called "the Red Rascal" has a story line which parodies the original.
- In the Babar episode "The Scarlet Pachyderm", the title character is a parody of the Scarlet Pimpernel.
- In the book Scarlet by Genevieve Cogman, the characters of the Scarlet Pimpernel make appearances as both protagonists and antagonists, with the Blakeneys being connected to some of the vampiric aristocrats of the book's plot.

== Possible inspiration for the character ==
Author Elizabeth Sparrow contends in her book Phantom of the Guillotine that the character is based on a French former artillery officer named Louis Bayard, claiming his life story matches the Pimpernel's exploits.

== Pimpernel used to name real rescuers ==
=== The Tartan Pimpernel (Donald Caskie) ===
Inspired by the title Scarlet Pimpernel, the Tartan Pimpernel was a nickname given to the Reverend Donald Caskie (1902–1983), formerly minister of the Paris congregation of the Church of Scotland, for aiding over 2,000 Allied service personnel to escape from occupied France during World War II.

=== The American Pimpernel (Varian Fry) ===
Varian Fry was a 32-year-old Harvard-educated classicist and editor from New York City who helped save thousands of endangered refugees who were caught in Vichy France, helping them to escape from Nazi terror during World War II. His story is told in American Pimpernel: The Man Who Saved the Artists on Hitler's Death List.

=== The Scarlet Pimpernel of the Vatican (Hugh O'Flaherty) ===
Monsignor Hugh O'Flaherty was an Irish priest who saved thousands of people, British and American servicemen and Jews, during World War II while in the Vatican in Rome. His story is told in two books and a film:

- J. P. Gallagher (1968), Scarlet Pimpernel of the Vatican, New York: Coward-McCann
- Brian Fleming (2008), The Vatican Pimpernel: The Wartime Exploits of Monsignor Hugh O’Flaherty, Collins Press
- The Scarlet and the Black, a 1983 made-for-television movie starring Gregory Peck and Christopher Plummer

=== The Black Pimpernel ===
==== Harald Edelstam ====
Harald Edelstam (1913–1989) was a Swedish diplomat. During World War II, he earned the nickname Svarta nejlikan ("the Black Pimpernel") for helping Norwegian resistance fighters in Hjemmefronten escape from the Germans. Stationed in Chile in the 1970s, he arranged for the escape of numerous refugees from the military junta of Augusto Pinochet; this brought him into conflict with the regime, and he eventually was forced to leave the country.

==== Nelson Mandela ====
This name was also given to Nelson Mandela prior to his arrest and long incarceration for his anti-apartheid activities in South Africa due to his effective use of disguises when evading capture by the police.

==== Walter Sisulu ====
"Behind the scenes, Mandela worked very closely with Walter Sisulu, who was now being pursued by the police. Z.K. Matthews told the Cape ANC in June that Sisulu was operating behind the 'Iron Curtain' of the Transkei as a Scarlet Pimpernel (before Mandela inherited the title): 'They sought him here, they sought him there, they sought him everywhere.'" Quote cites: Karis & Carter, Vol.3, op. cit., p.128

=== Raoul Wallenberg ===
Raoul Wallenberg, a Swedish diplomat, was directly inspired by "Pimpernel" Smith, a 1941 British anti-Nazi propaganda thriller, to begin rescuing Hungarian Jews during World War II. The film had been banned in Sweden, but Wallenberg and his sister Nina were invited to a private screening at the British Embassy in Stockholm. Enthralled by Professor Smith (played by Leslie Howard), who saved thousands of Jews from the Nazis, Nina stated, "We thought the film was amazing. When we got up from our seats, Raoul said, 'that is the kind of thing I would like to do'". Wallenberg issued false passports identifying the Jews as Swedish nationals, and is credited with rescuing at least 15,000 Jews. He disappeared in Eastern Europe after the war, and is believed to have died in a Soviet prison camp.
