= Stoutenburg =

- Village and neighbourhood
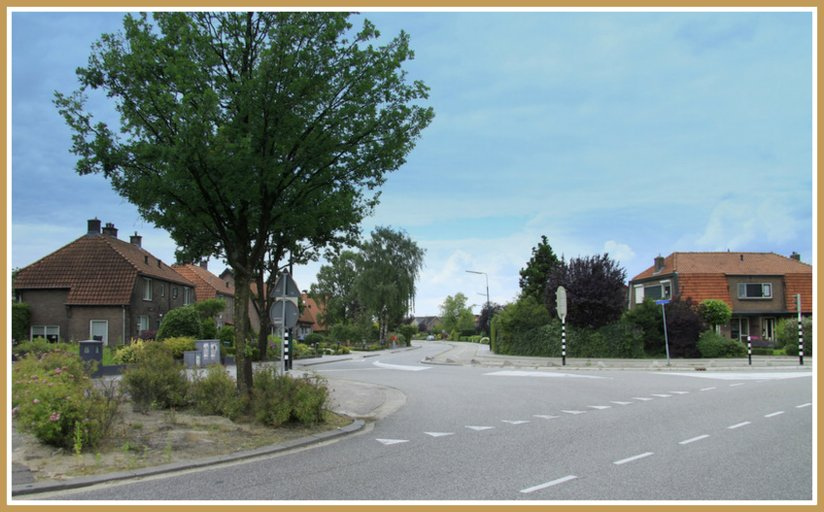
- Street view

- Location in the Netherlands Stoutenburg (Netherlands)
- Coordinates: 52°9′14″N 5°25′57″E
- Country: Netherlands
- Province: Utrecht
- Municipality: Leusden; Amersfoort

Area
  - Total: 6.89 km^{2} (2.66 sq mi)
- Elevation: 4 m (13 ft)

Population (2021)
  - Total: 485
  - Density: 70.4/km^{2} (182/sq mi)
- Time zone: UTC+1 (CET)
  - Summer (DST): UTC+2 (CEST)
- Postal code: 3835 & 3836
- Dialing code: 033

Stoutenburg is a village in the Dutch province of Utrecht. It is a part of the municipality of Leusden, and lies about 4 km (2 mi) east of Amersfoort. Since 1998, a part of the village is a neighbourhood in Amersfoort.

== History ==
The village was first mentioned in 1262 as Walter van Stoltenberch, and means "strong hill" which is a reference to castle Stoutenburg.

In 1252, the castle Stoutenburg near the village was founded by the lord of Amersfoort. From 1615, the castle was owned by Johan van Oldenbarnevelt. The castle was replaced by a manor, built in 1888. In 1948, the estate which was heavily damaged by war was bought by the Franciscans, and in 1952, a monastery opened. In 2019, the manor house was turned in an apartment building for people with Alzheimer.

In 1840, Stoutenburg was home to 584 people. Until 1 June 1969, Stoutenburg was a separate municipality, covering the villages of Stoutenburg and Achterveld. Most of the territory of the former municipality is now part of Leusden; the northern part was annexed by the municipality of Amersfoort in 1998.

== Gallery ==
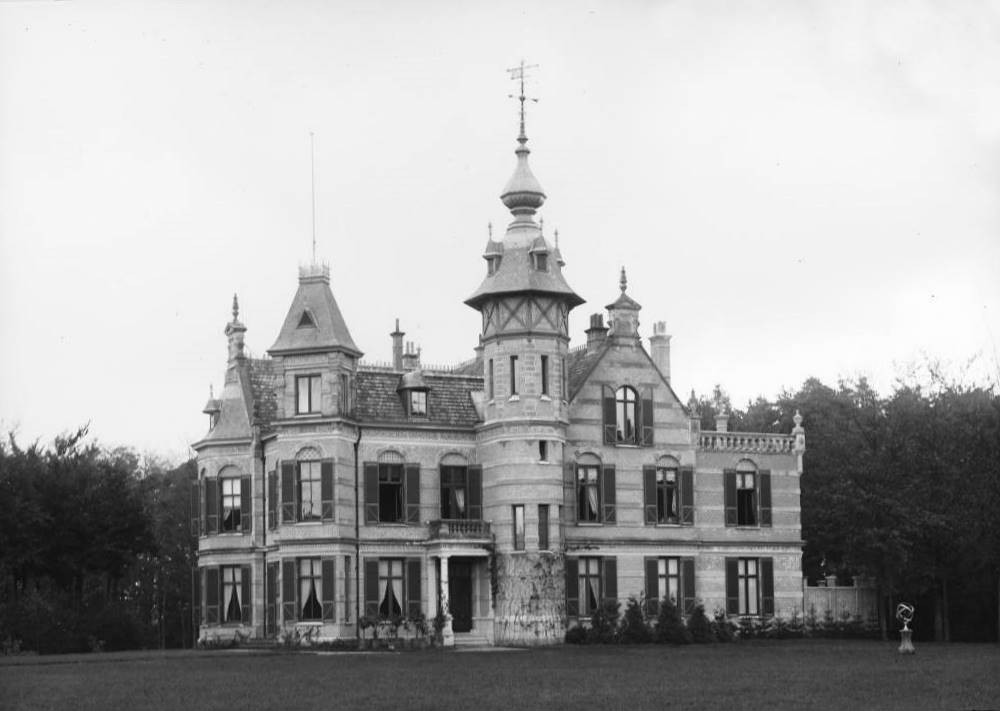
Castle Stoutenburg (1891)

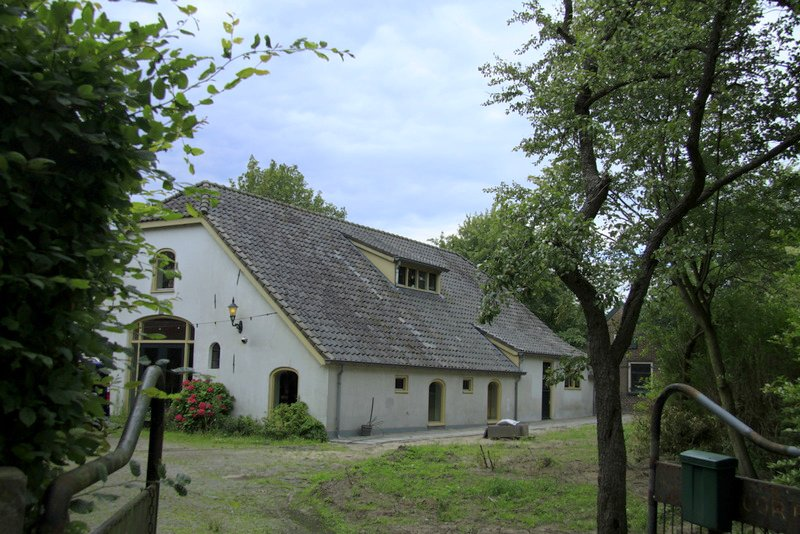
Farm in Stoutenburg

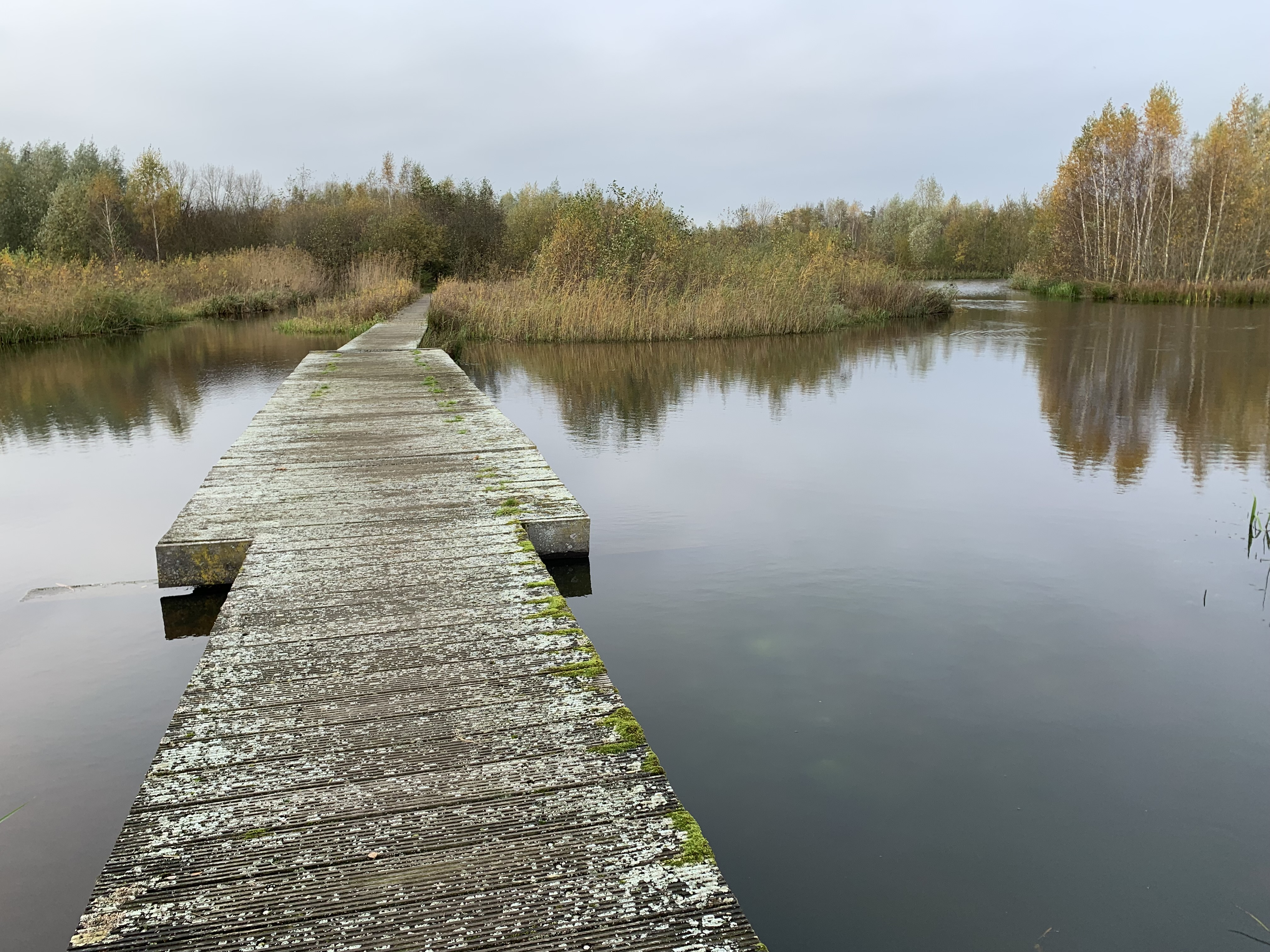
Nature area De Schammer

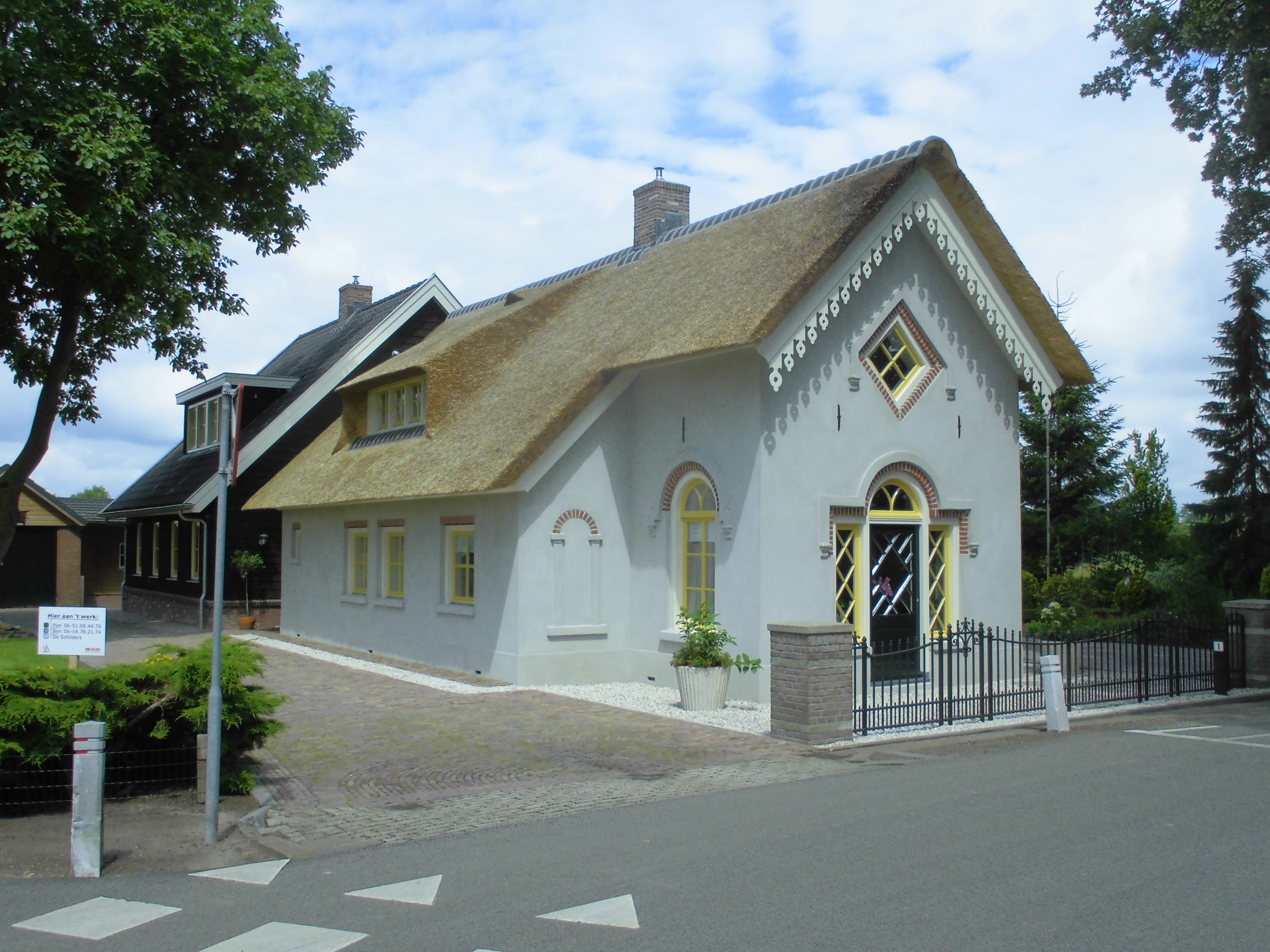
Former toll house
