= Hof van Delft =

Coordinates: 52°0′42″N 4°20′50″E

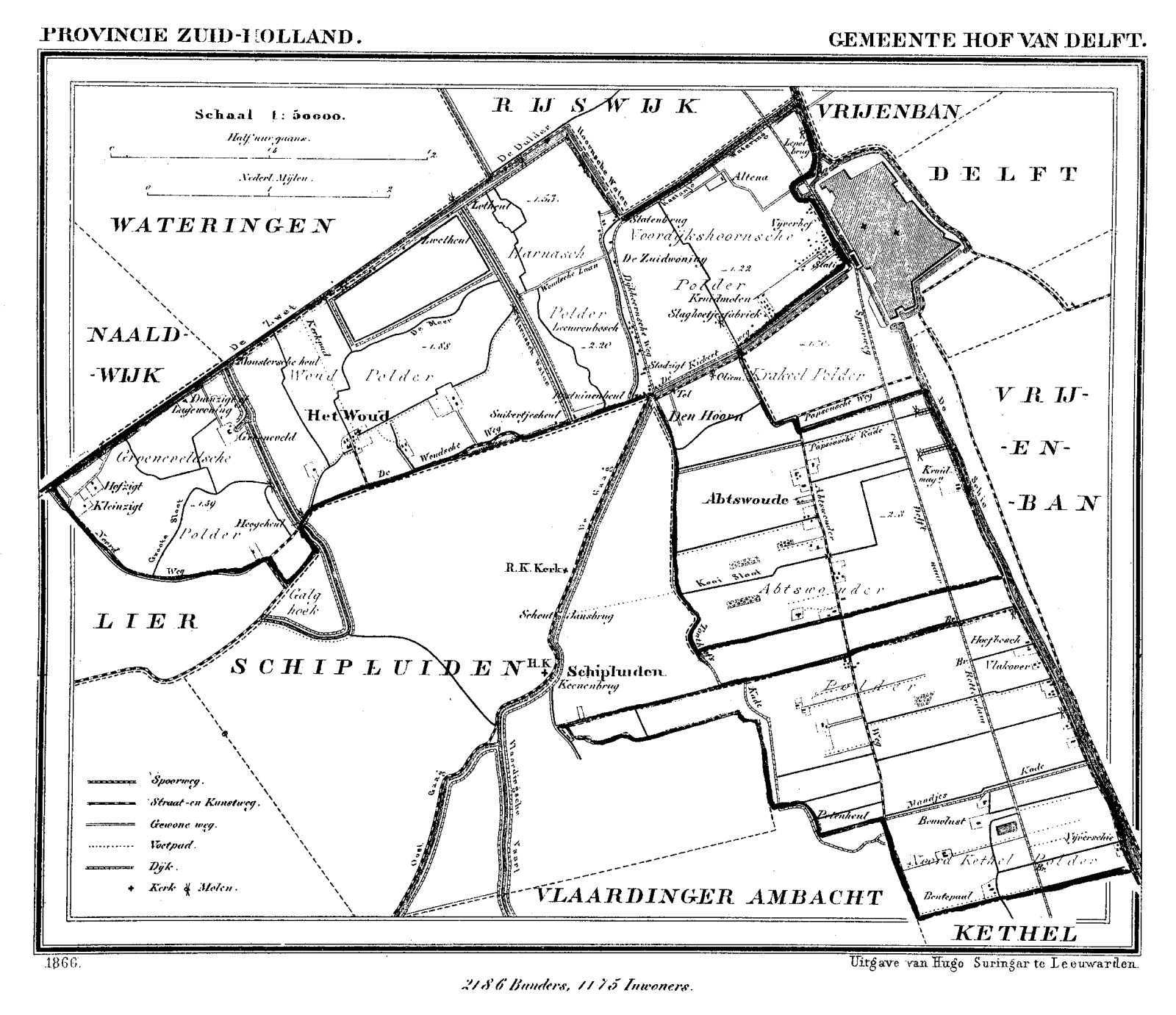
The former municipality in 1868.

Hof van Delft ("Court of Delft") is a former municipality in the Dutch province of South Holland. It was located to the west of the city of Delft, and covered the villages of Den Hoorn, Abtswoude, and 't Woudt.

The municipality existed from 1817 to 1921, when it became a part of Delft.

Currently, the name "Hof van Delft" is used for a neighbourhood in the northwest of Delft, west of the railway track to The Hague, which is only a small part of the former municipality.
