= Groeneveld, Netherlands =

Coordinates: 52°46′N 4°47′E

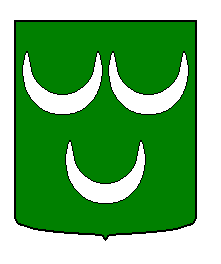
Coats of arms to Groeneveld

Groeneveld (Dutch pronunciation: [ˈɣrunəvɛlt]) is a former municipality in the Dutch province of South Holland. It was located to the west of the city of Delft. The municipality covered the Groeneveldse Polder, northwest of De Lier, and contained no towns or villages; only the hamlet of Lierhand.

The municipality of Groeneveld was split off from 't Woud in 1817, and only existed until 1855, when it became part of Hof van Delft.
