= KNSA =

KNSA may refer to:

- KNSA (AM), a radio station (930 AM) licensed to Unalakleet, Alaska, United States
- Koninklijke Nederlandse Schutters Associatie
