= Royal Dutch Shooting Sport Association =

Koninklijke Nederlandse Schietsport Associatie
- Sport: Shooting sports
- Jurisdiction: National
- Membership: 684 (year 2015)
- Abbreviation: KNSA
- Founded: 1968
- Affiliation: ISSF
- Regional affiliation: European Shooting Confederation
- Headquarters: Landweg 235, Leusden

The Royal Dutch Shooting Sport Association, Dutch Koninklijke Nederlandse Schietsport Associatie (KNSA), is a shooting sport governing body in the Netherlands which is internationally affiliated with the International Shooting Sport Federation (ISSF) and Muzzle Loaders Associations International Committee (MLAIC).

== History ==
The Royal Dutch Shooting Sport Association was founded in 1968 as a fusion of three associations. The Nederlandse Luchtbuks Federatie (Dutch Airgun Federation) and the Nationale Organisatie De Vrijheid (National Freedom Organisation) were dismantled and the Koninklijke Vereniging van Nederlandse Scherpschutters (Royal Association of Dutch Marksmen) changed its name into Koninklijke Nederlandse Schutters Associatie (Royal Dutch Shooters Association). In 2013 the association changed Schutters (shooters) into Schietsport (Shooting Sport).

== Competitions ==
KNSA coordinates the qualifying process for Dutch athletes to participate in the Shooting at the Summer Olympics and Paralympics. it also regulates non-olympic competitions and events.

== Legal support ==
The Association supports its over 600 member clubs to comply with the national laws and regulations regarding fireweapons. In 2004, KNSA commissioned a study regarding the environmental impact of clay pigeon shooting. The study was the basis for new regulation.

In 2020, the KNSA presented a challenge in court regarding the e-screener, a digital questionnaire to assess the psychological condition of gun license applicants. KNSA argued that it infringed the General Data Protection Regulation. The judge dismissed the challenge.

== See also ==
- Netherlands Practical Shooting Association
