= Oud-Leusden =

Oud Leusden
- Hamlet
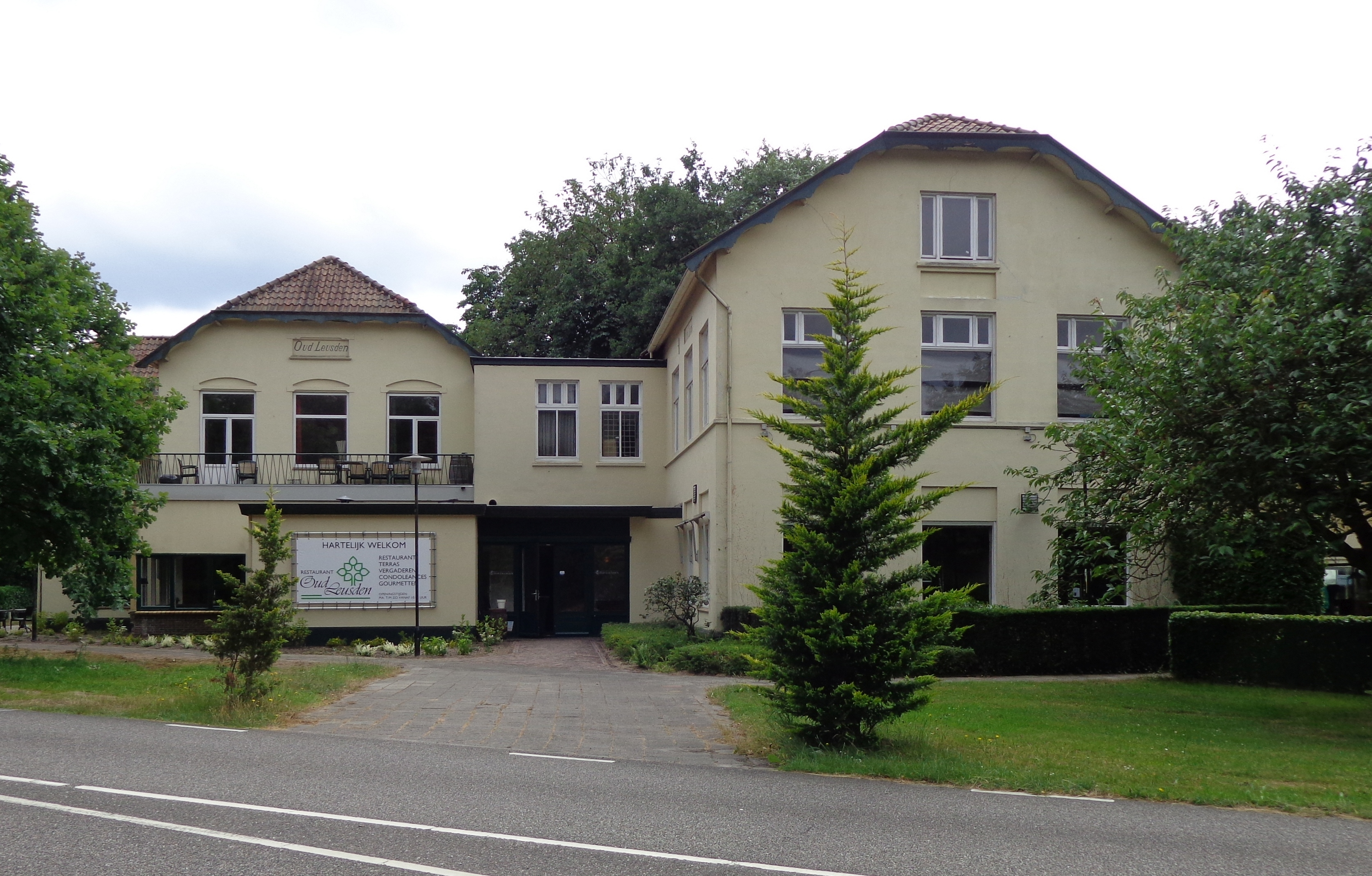
- Restaurant

- Location in the Netherlands Oud Leusden (Netherlands)
- Coordinates: 52.13095°N 5.37264°E
- Country: Netherlands
- Province: Utrecht
- Municipality: Leusden
- Time zone: UTC+1 (CET)
  - Summer (DST): UTC+2 (CEST)
- Postal code: 3832
- Dialing code: 033

Oud-Leusden is a hamlet in the Dutch province of Utrecht. It is a part of the municipality of Leusden, and lies about 4 km south of Amersfoort.

== History ==
Oud-Leusden ("old-Leusden") was formerly just called "Leusden". The name is known from the year 777, when villa Lisaduna was a large farm complex with defences. Although it was assumed to be located near the current location of Oud-Leusden, no evidence of this complex has been found.

The church tower of Oud-Leusden was originally part of a church, which before the reformation was dedicated to Saint Anthony. In the nineteenth century, most of the churchgoing population lived in the nearby village of Leusbroek (now Leusden-Zuid), and the church was replaced with a new one in Leusbroek, and demolished in 1828.

Oud-Leusden is not a statistical entity, and the postal authorities have placed it under Leusden. The hamlet consists of about 15 houses.

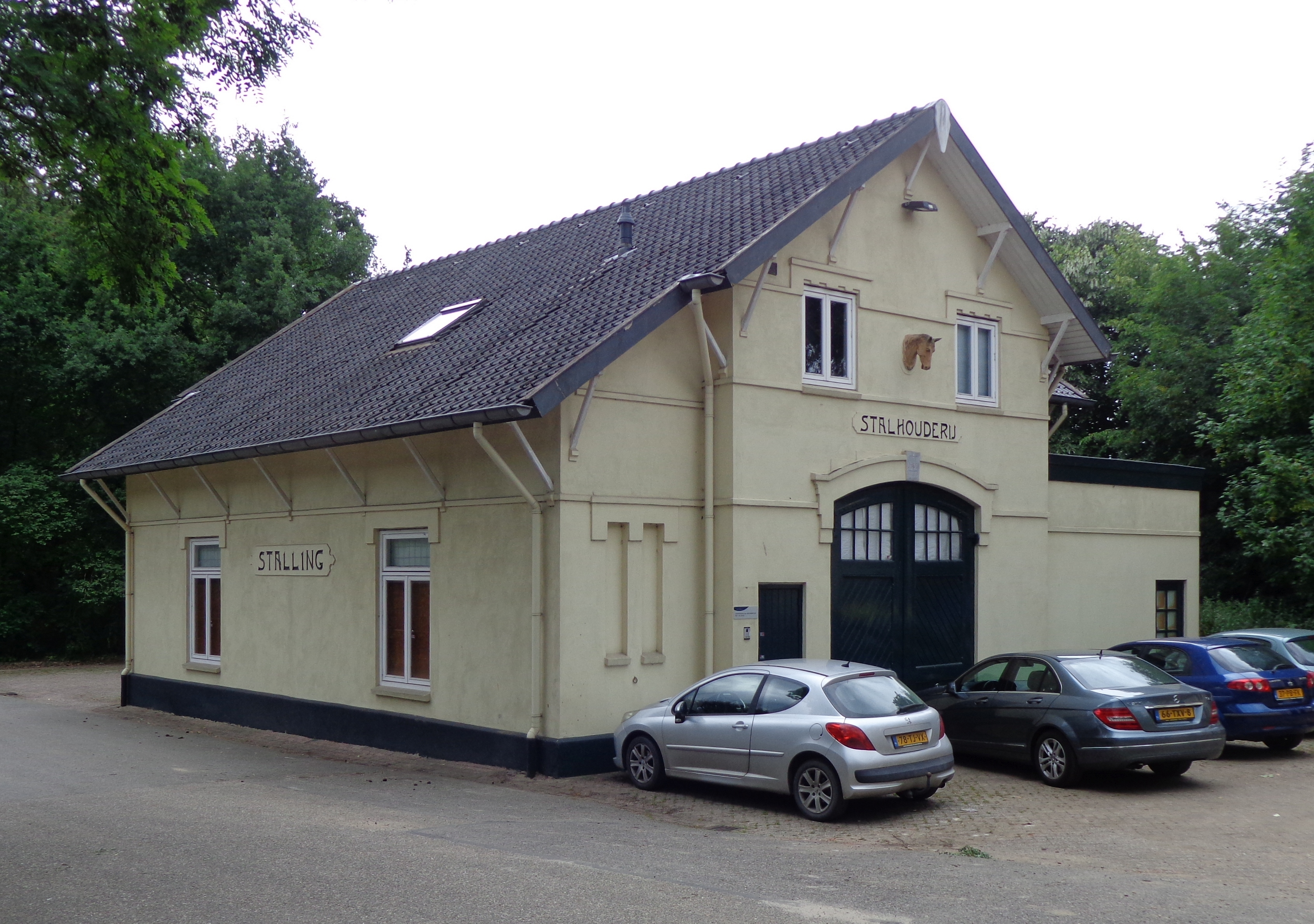
Former stables at Oud-Leusden

== See also ==
- Rusthof cemetery
