= Leusden-Zuid =

- Neighbourhood and former village
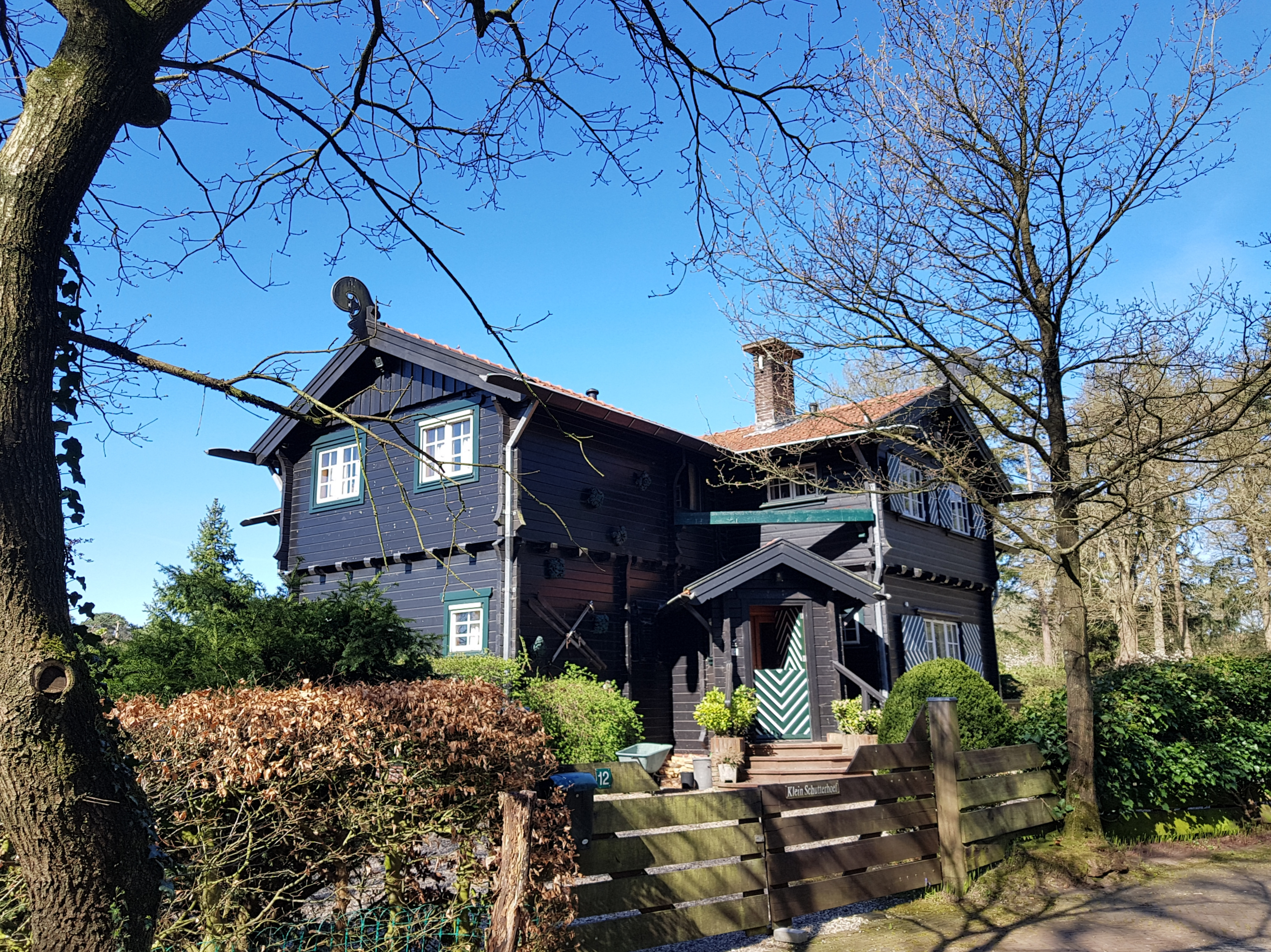
- Villa Klein Schutterhoef

- Location in the Netherlands Leusden-Zuid (Netherlands)
- Coordinates: 52°7′9″N 5°24′23″E
- Country: Netherlands
- Province: Utrecht
- Municipality: Leusden

Area
  - Total: 27.70 km^{2} (10.70 sq mi)
- Elevation: 3 m (9.8 ft)

Population (2004)
  - Total: 5,210
  - Density: 188/km^{2} (487/sq mi)
- Time zone: UTC+1 (CET)
  - Summer (DST): UTC+2 (CEST)
- Postal code: 3832
- Dialing code: 033

Leusden-Zuid is a neighbourhood and former village in the Dutch province of Utrecht. It is a part of the municipality of Leusden, and lies about 6 km south of Amersfoort. The village is now part of Leusden.

Until about 1969, the village was named "Leusbroek". The reformed church of the village dates from 1827; until that date the villagers went to church in the nearby village of Oud-Leusden.

The Estate Den Treek was built in 1807. A nature area of forests and heaths covering almost 22 square kilometres (8.5 sq mi) is part of the estate and covers five municipalities which makes Den Treek, the largest family owned estate. The nature area is publicly accessible for the recreational purposes.

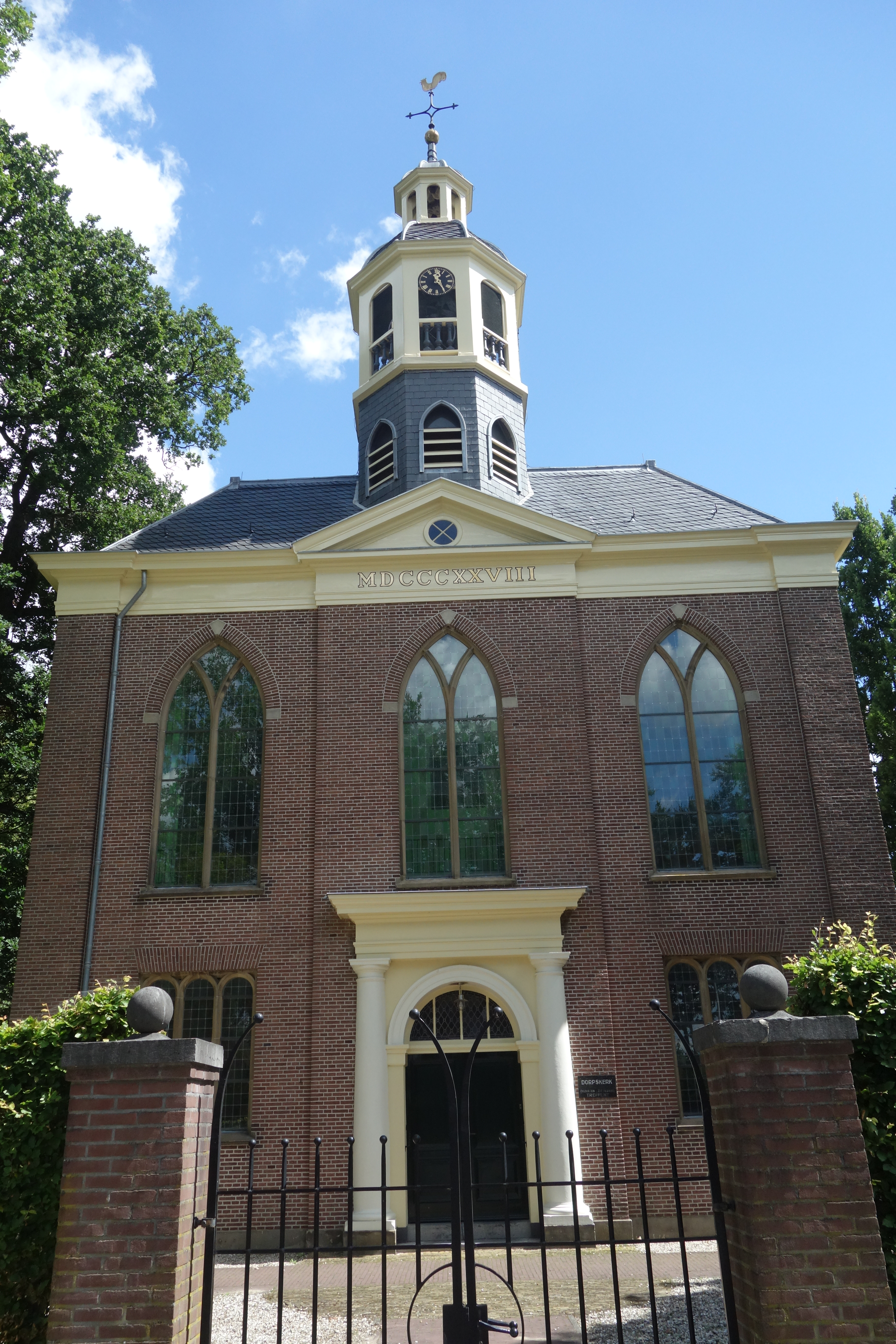
Church in Leusden-Zuid

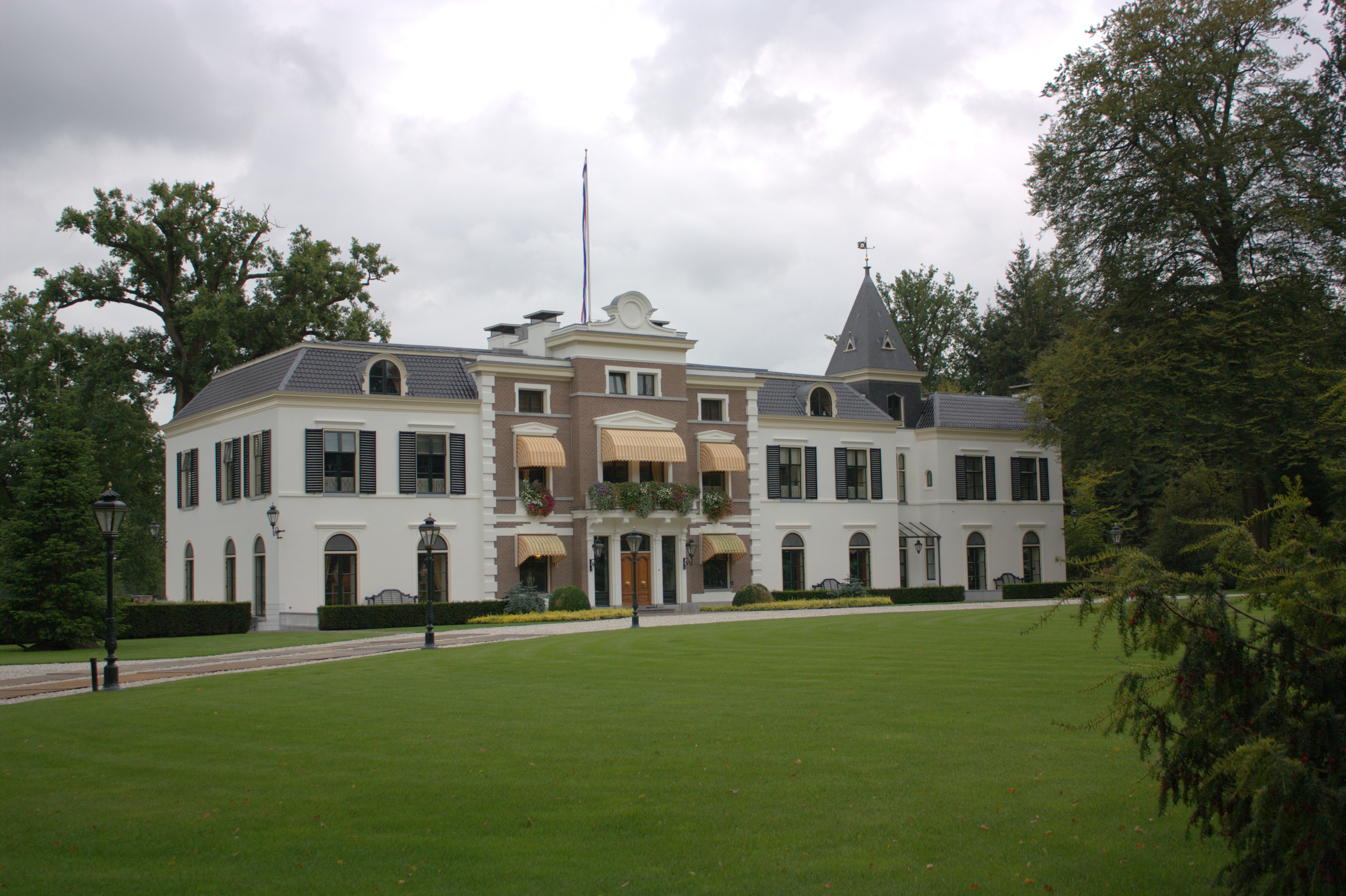
Estate Den Treek

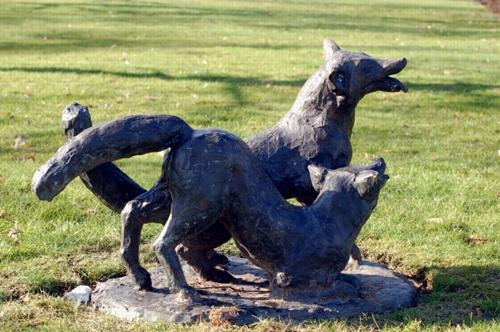
Foxes statue by W. Albers Pistorius

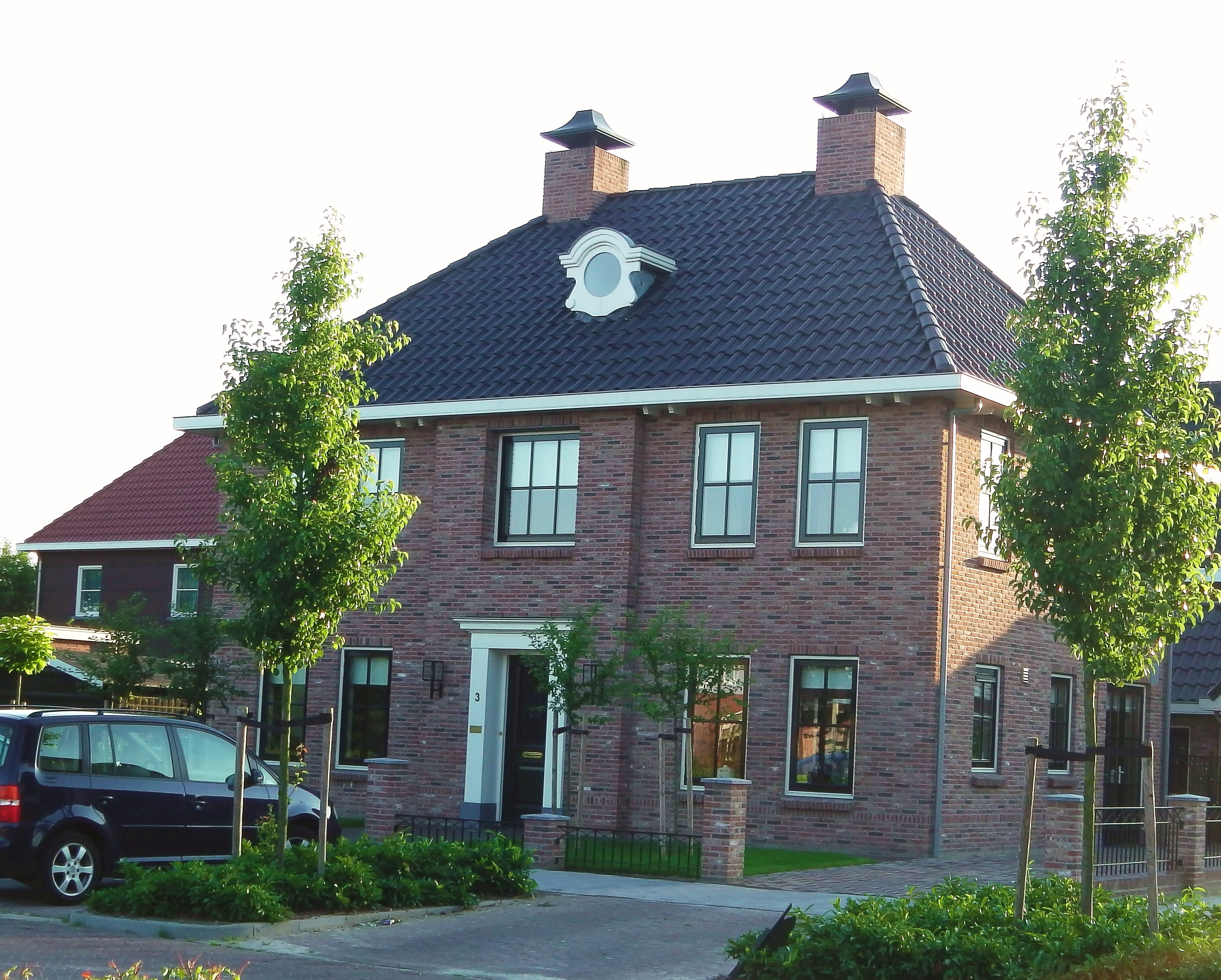
House in Leusden-Zuid
