= Netherlands Practical Shooting Association =

Dutch sports organization

- Nederlandse Parcours Schutters Associatie
- President: Sasja Barentsen
- Parent organization: International Practical Shooting Confederation
- Website: ipsc.nl

Netherlands Practical Shooting Association, Dutch Nederlandse Parcours Schutters Associatie (NPSA) is the Dutch association for practical shooting under the International Practical Shooting Confederation.

== History ==
In 2012, the NPSA spoke out against a proposed Dutch government ban on shooting competitions with moving targets.

In 2016, the NPSA organised the first Dutch Open international championship, co-hosted by the shooting clubs Katwijk (SSVK) and de Vrijheid in Leiderdorp.

In 2020, NPSA members had to cancel their participation in a shooting competition in Thailand due to the global COVID-19 pandemic.

== See also ==
- Netherlands Royal Shooting Sport Association
