= Leusden =

- Municipality
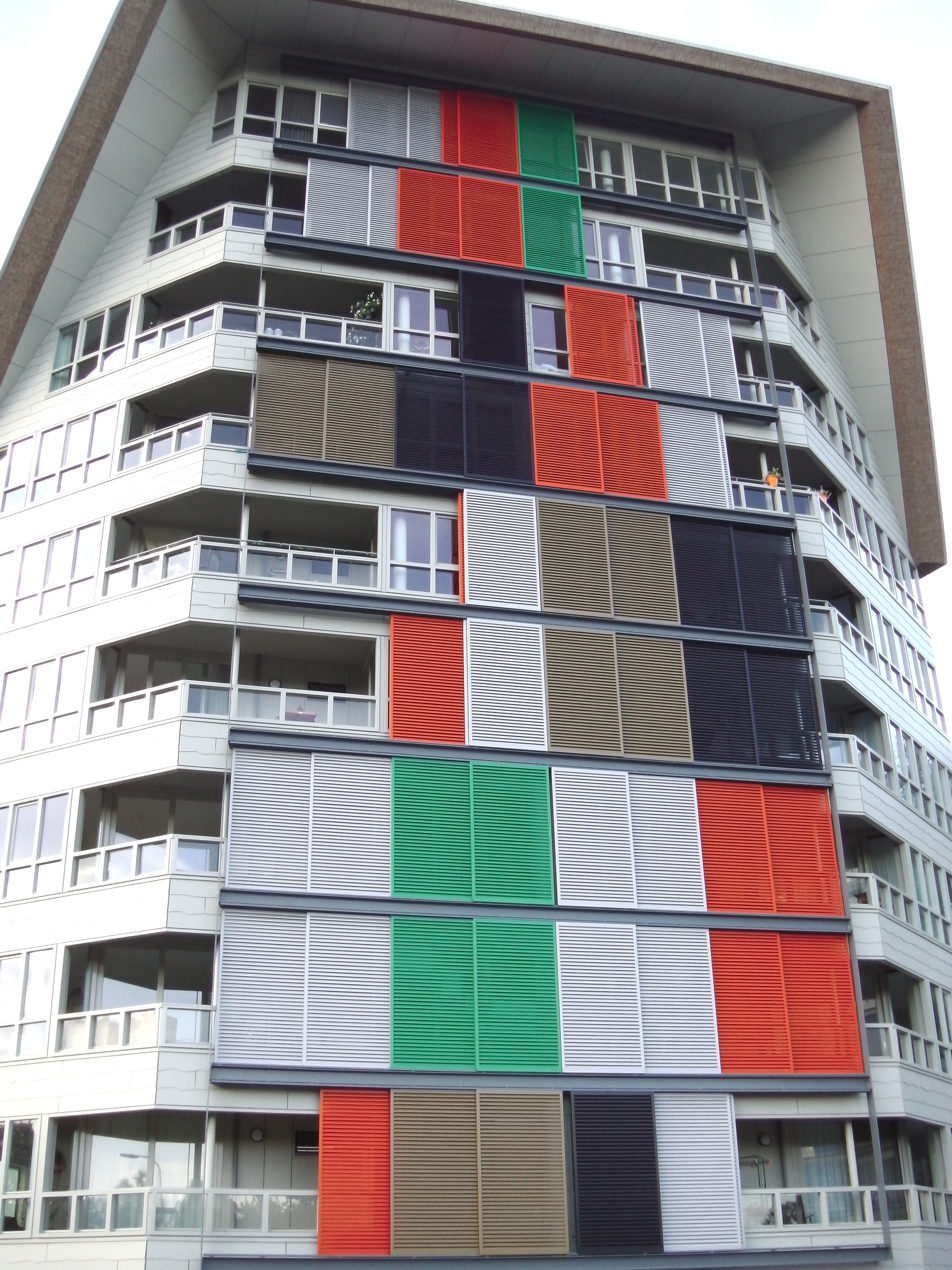
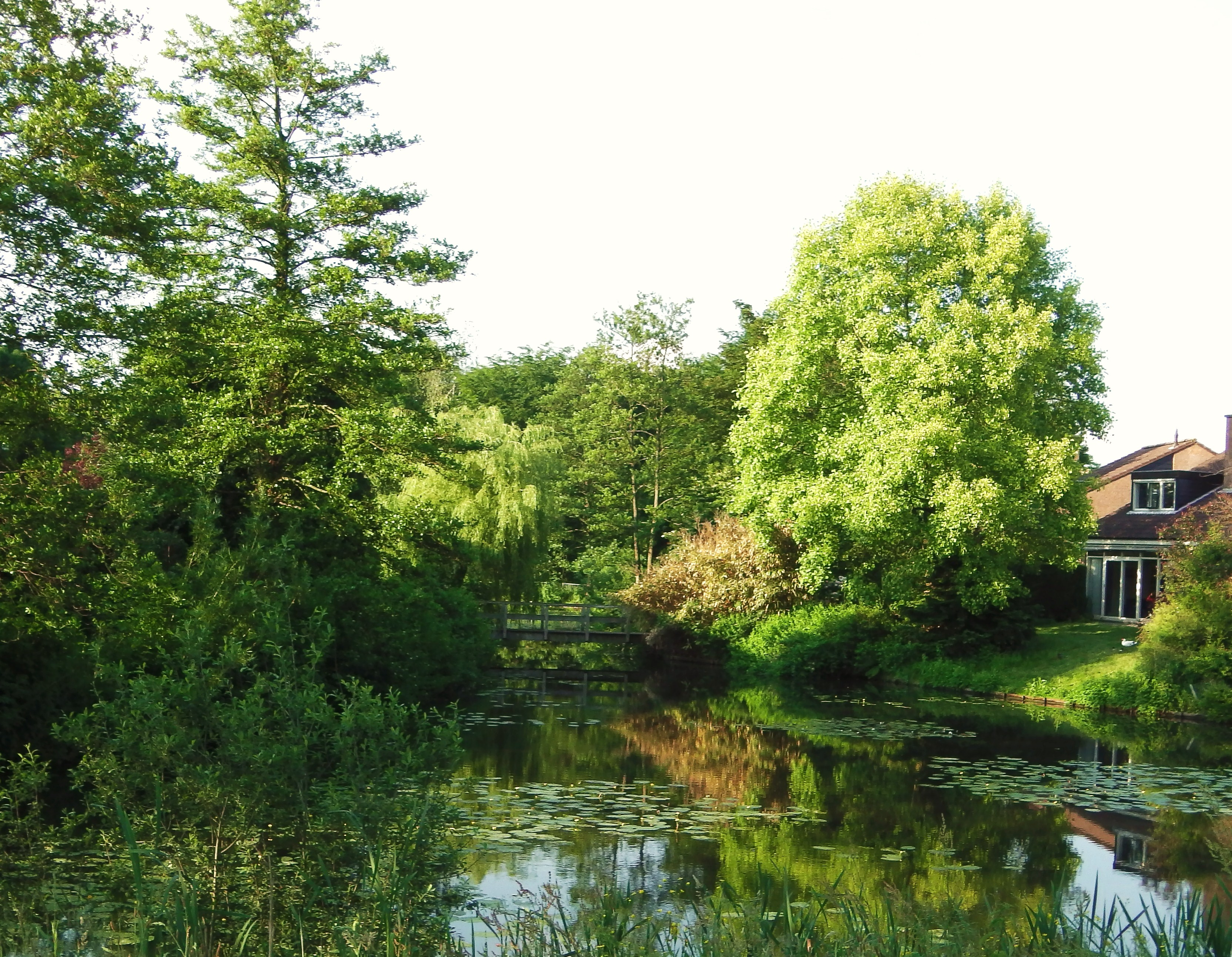
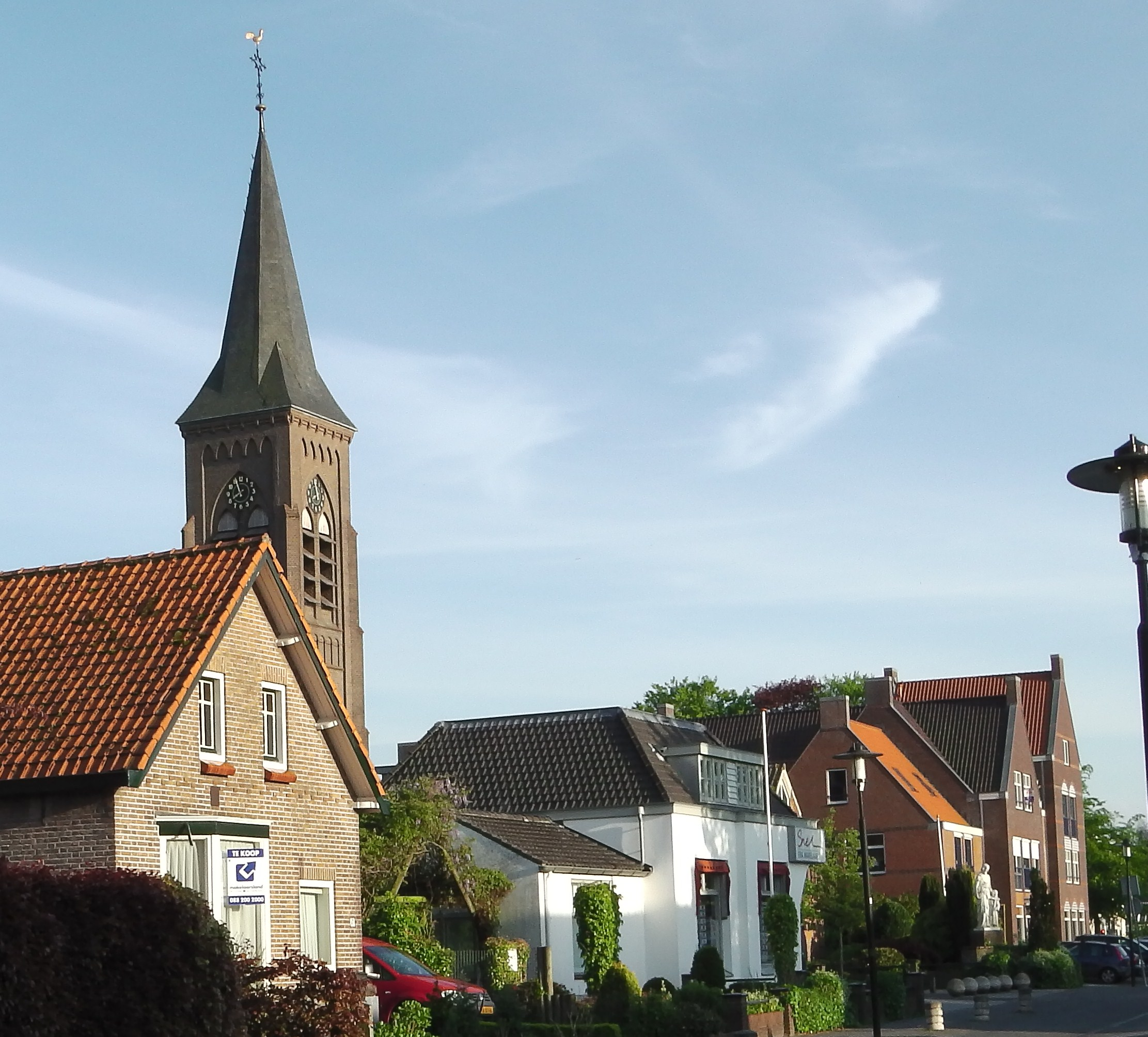
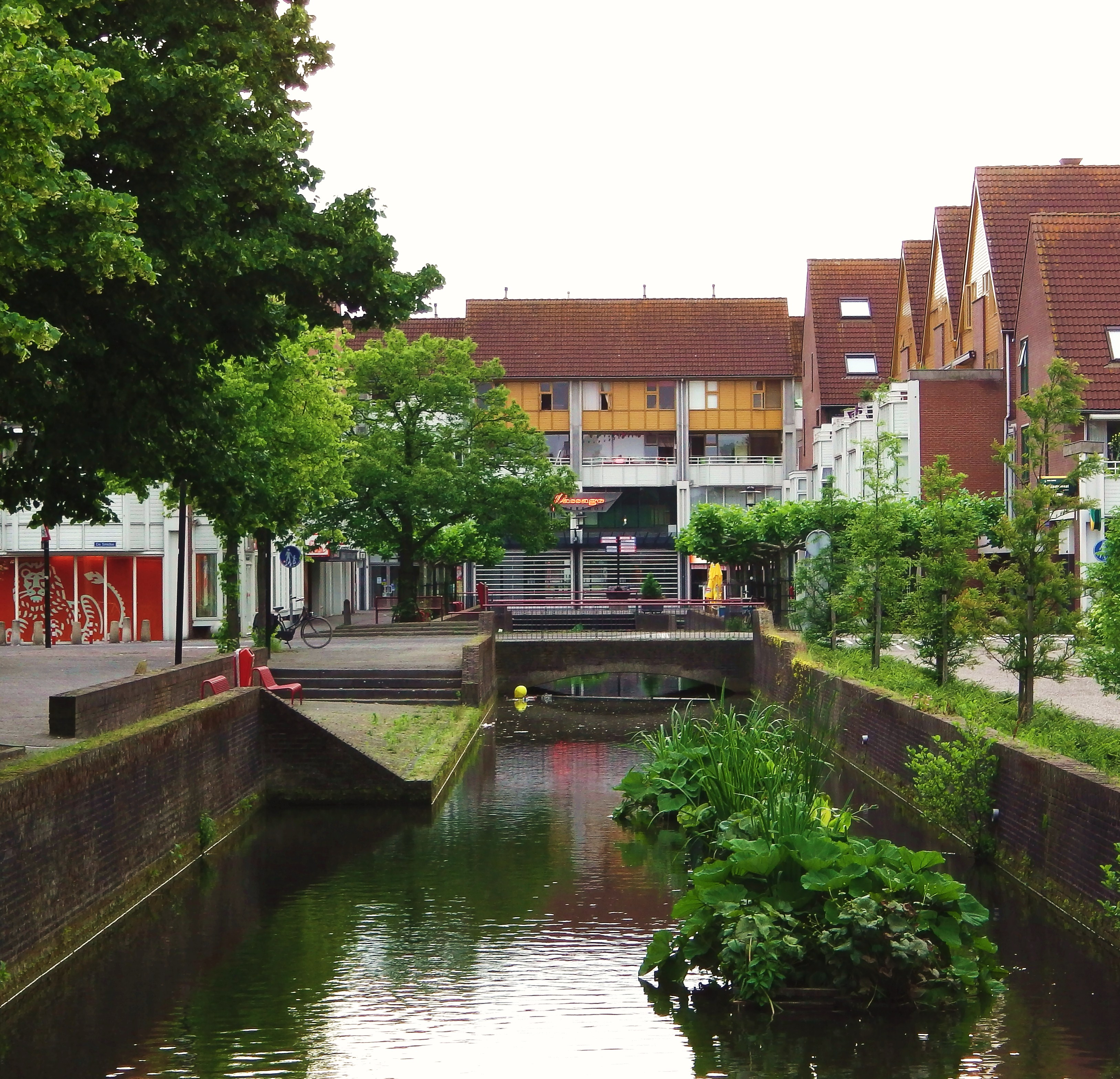
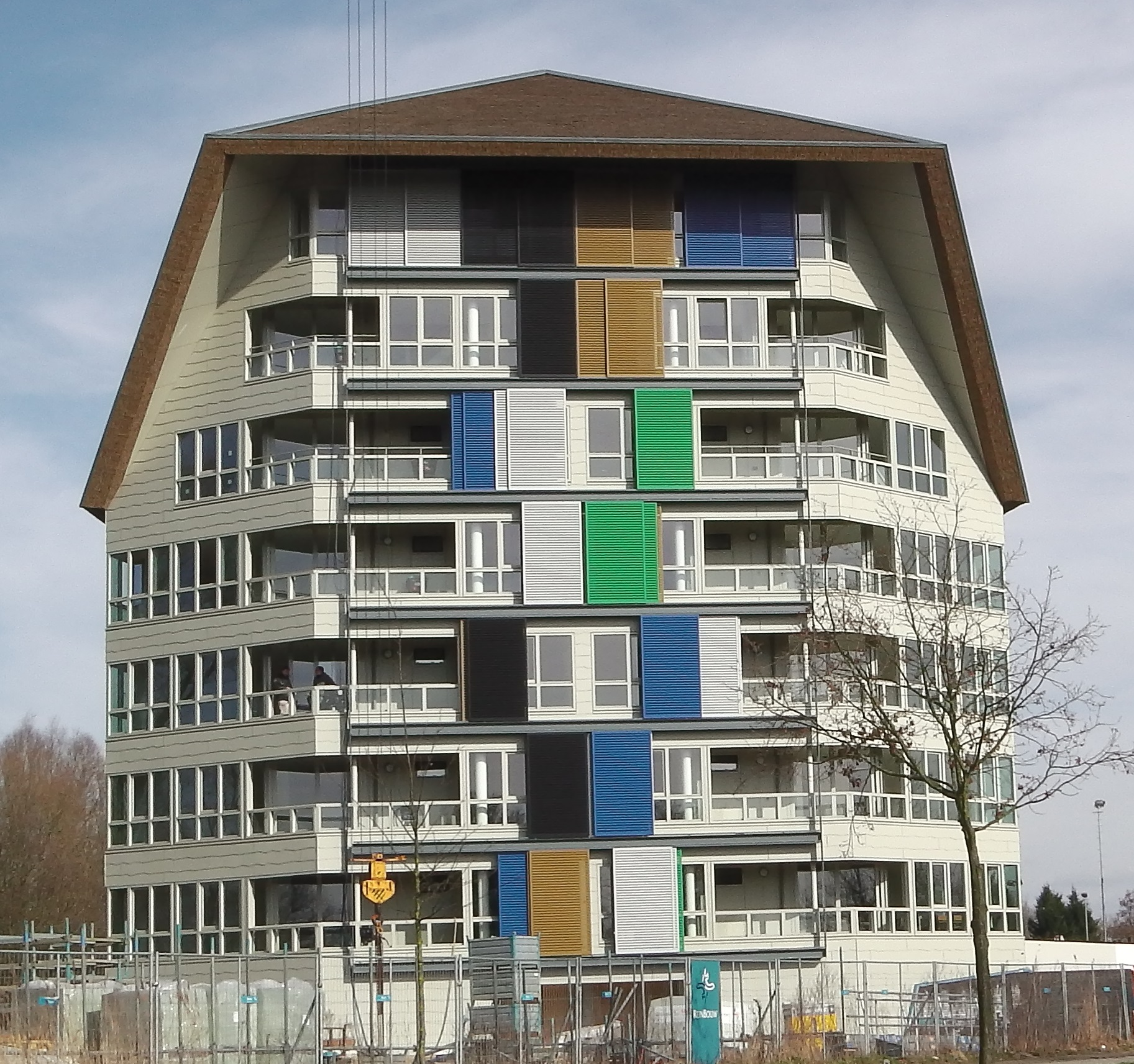
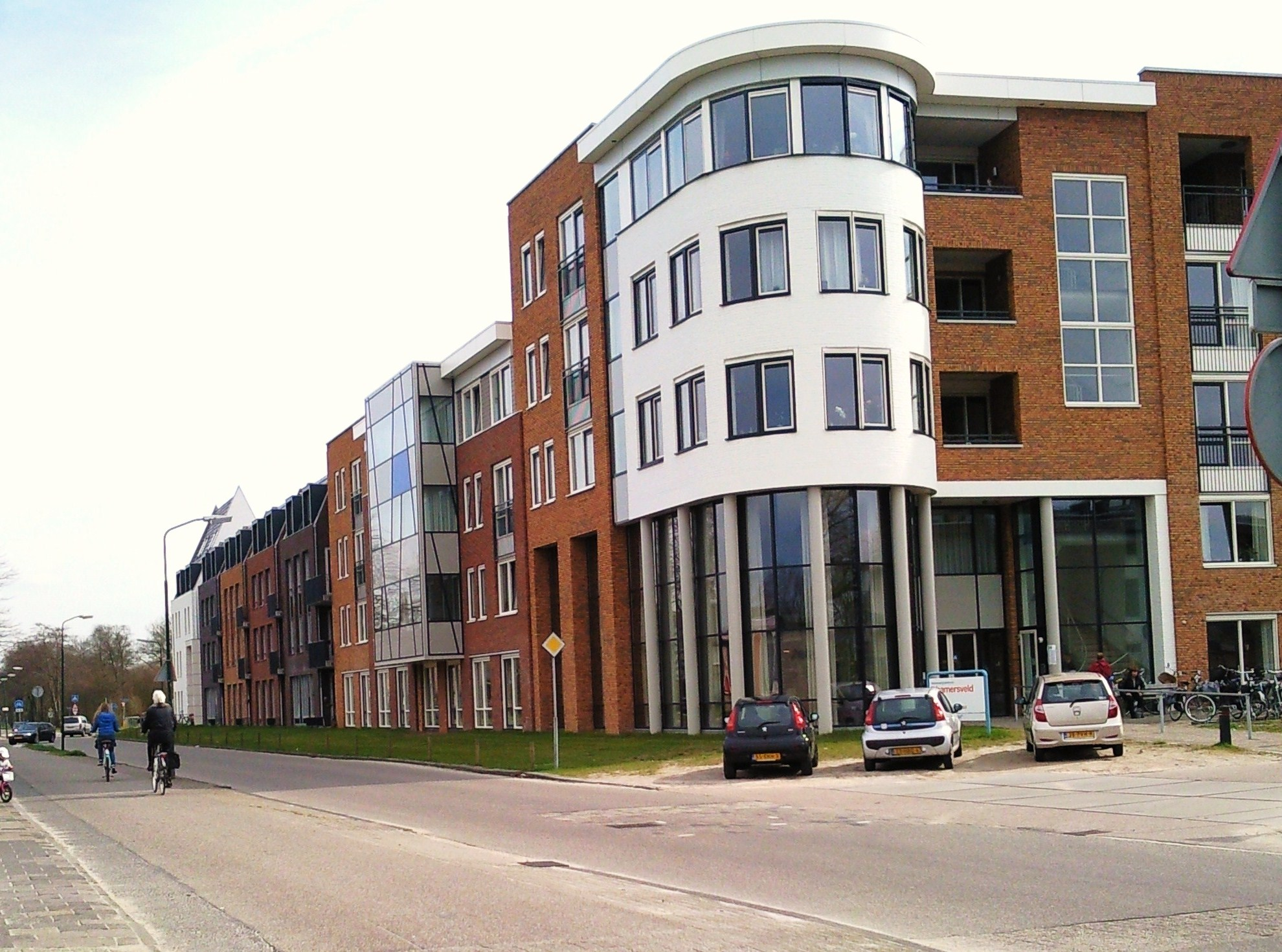
- Highrise building Park Wildenburg St. Jozefkerk Kooikersgracht Residential tower Biezenkamp

- Flag Coat of arms

- Location in Utrecht
- Coordinates: 52°8′N 5°26′E
- Country: Netherlands
- Province: Utrecht

Government
  - Body: Municipal council
  - Mayor: Gerolf Bouwmeester (D66)

Area
  - Total: 58.89 km^{2} (22.74 sq mi)
  - Land: 58.54 km^{2} (22.60 sq mi)
  - Water: 0.35 km^{2} (0.14 sq mi)
- Elevation: 3 m (9.8 ft)

Population (January 2021)
  - Total: 30,544
  - Density: 522/km^{2} (1,350/sq mi)
- Demonym: Leusdenaar
- Time zone: UTC+1 (CET)
  - Summer (DST): UTC+2 (CEST)
- Postcode: 3830–3835
- Area code: 033
- Website: www.leusden.nl

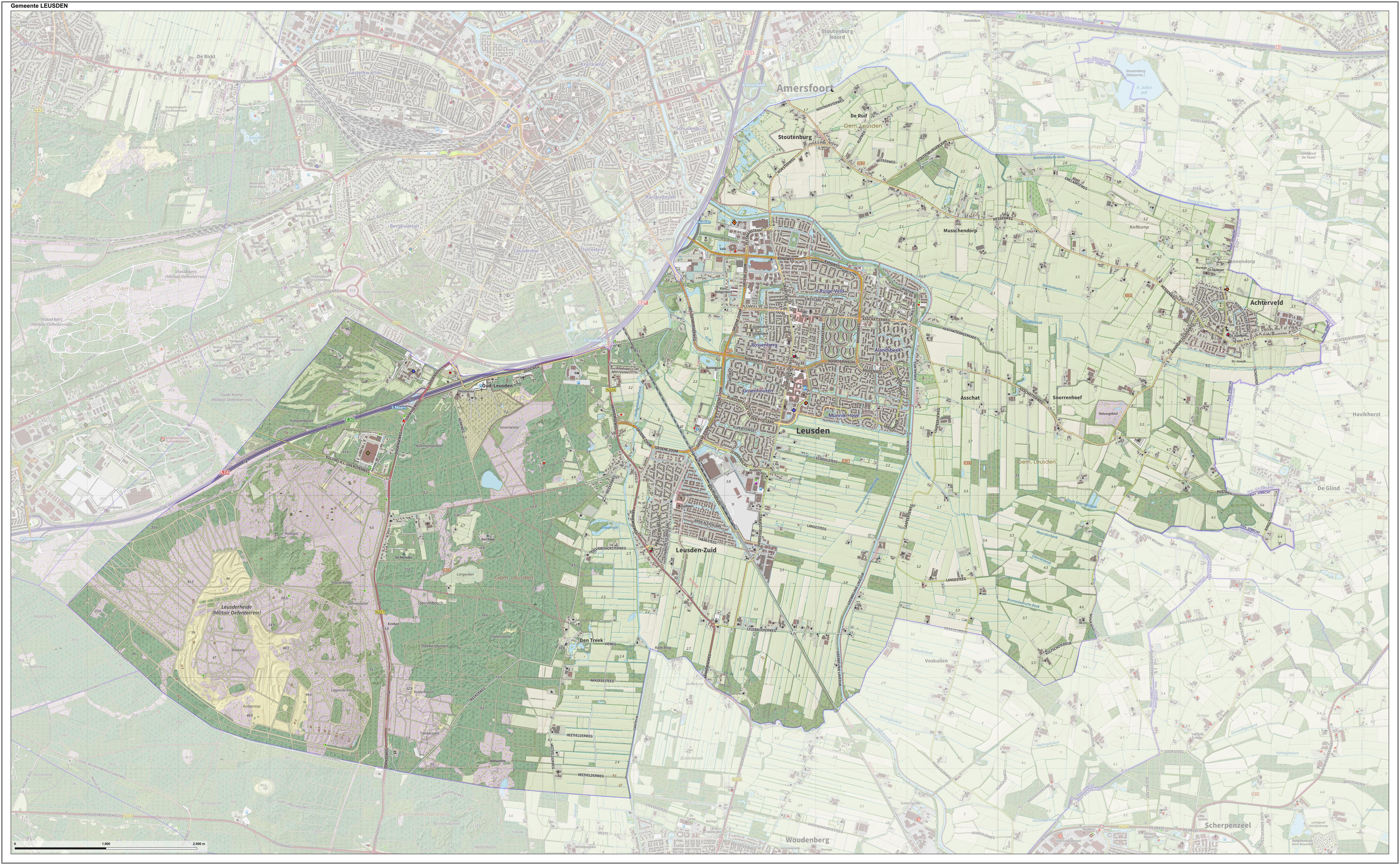
Dutch Topographic map of Leusden, June 2015

Leusden (Dutch pronunciation: [ˈløːzdə(n)]) is a municipality and a town in the Netherlands, in the province of Utrecht. It is located about 3 kilometres southeast of Amersfoort.

The western part of the municipality lies on the slopes of the Utrecht Hill Ridge and is largely covered by forest and heathlands. The eastern parts lie in the Gelderse Valley and are mostly agricultural.

Former Amersfoort concentration camp lies just within the northern municipal border with Amersfoort.

== Population centres ==
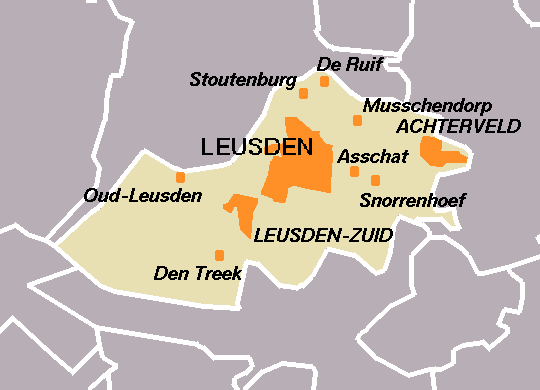
Map of the municipality, with towns and villages.

The municipality of Leusden contains four villages:

- Leusden, originally named "Hamersveld" and later "Leusden-Centrum";
- Leusden-Zuid, formerly "Leusbroek"
- Achterveld
- Stoutenburg

There are also a number of hamlets in the municipality:

- Asschat
- Den Treek
- De Ruif
- Jannendorp
- Musschendorp
- Oud-Leusden
- Snorrenhoef

== The town of Leusden ==
The place that is now called Leusden was first mentioned as Villa Lisiduna in a charter in 777. The exact location of that settlement, which is considered to have been a rather extensive farm complex with defenses, is unknown to us. It is possible that the old village of Oud-Leusden once was the location of Villa Lisiduna but excavations in the 1980s have not provided any evidence. However, the church tower of Oud-Leusden is one of the oldest towers in the Netherlands, dating back at least to the 11th century A.D. Close to Leusden is the site of the former monastery Heiligenberg, founded around the year 1000 by bishop Ansfridus of Utrecht, who died here in 1010.

In the 1970s, the agricultural villages of Leusbroek and Hamersveld grew together into a larger, mainly residential town. What once was Hamersveld is now called Leusden-Centrum, now commonly Leusden, and Leusbroek was to become Leusden-Zuid. In the original plans, Leusden was to grow into a town of around 46,000 inhabitants. After the initial expansion there was a growing resistance from the population, so some of the later phases of expansion have been abandoned.

== History ==
During the Pentecost weekend of 1924, the municipality housed the first ever Pinksterlanddagen also known as "Landdag voor anarchistische jongeren" (Land-day for anarchist youth). It was held on a terrain on the 'dode weg' owned by the municipality of Amersfoort.

== Shopping areas ==
In Leusden there are 3 main shopping areas:

1) "De Hamershof", located in the center near the town hall, with almost 90 stores. The oldest part opened in 1980 together with the Town Hall. It was renovated in 2018

2) "De Biezenkamp", north of Hamershof, with around 20 shops. The biggest market of the town takes place here every Tuesday. Modernization took place in 2016 and onwards, including new apartments that were built in the area.

3) "De Zuidhoek" opened in 2012 in Leusden-Zuid, to accommodate the people living in the new neighborhood "de Tabaksteeg"

In October 2025 began construction at the military training area in Leusderheide of a building that will house Technologie Centrum Land (TCL). The building will have a floor area of 60,000 square meters and replace the old tank workshop that was used the last few years to perform maintenance of ground-based vehicles of the Royal Netherlands Army.

== Notable residents ==
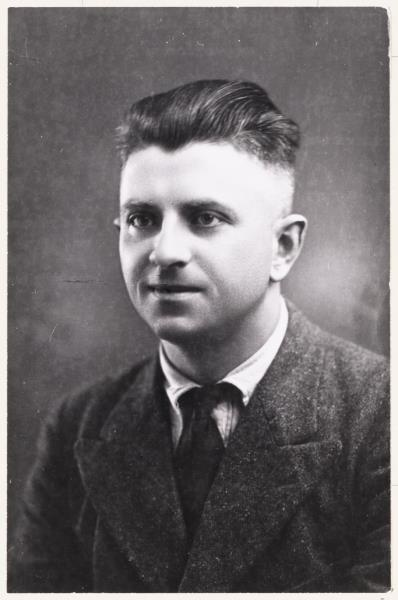
Gerrit Achterberg, 1936

- Gerrit Achterberg (1905-1962 in Leusden) a poet
- Arleen Auger (1939-1993 in Leusden) an American soprano
- Robby Valentine (born 1968 in Leusden) singer and multi-instrumentalist
- Marieke Wijsman (born 1975 in Leusden) former speed-skater, competed at the 1988 and 2002 Winter Olympics
- Marike Jager (born 1979) a Dutch singer-songwriter, guitarist and TV presenter, grew up in Leusden
- Haike van Stralen (born 1983 in Leusden) a Dutch former freestyle swimmer, who competed at the 2000 and 2004 Summer Olympics

== Image gallery ==
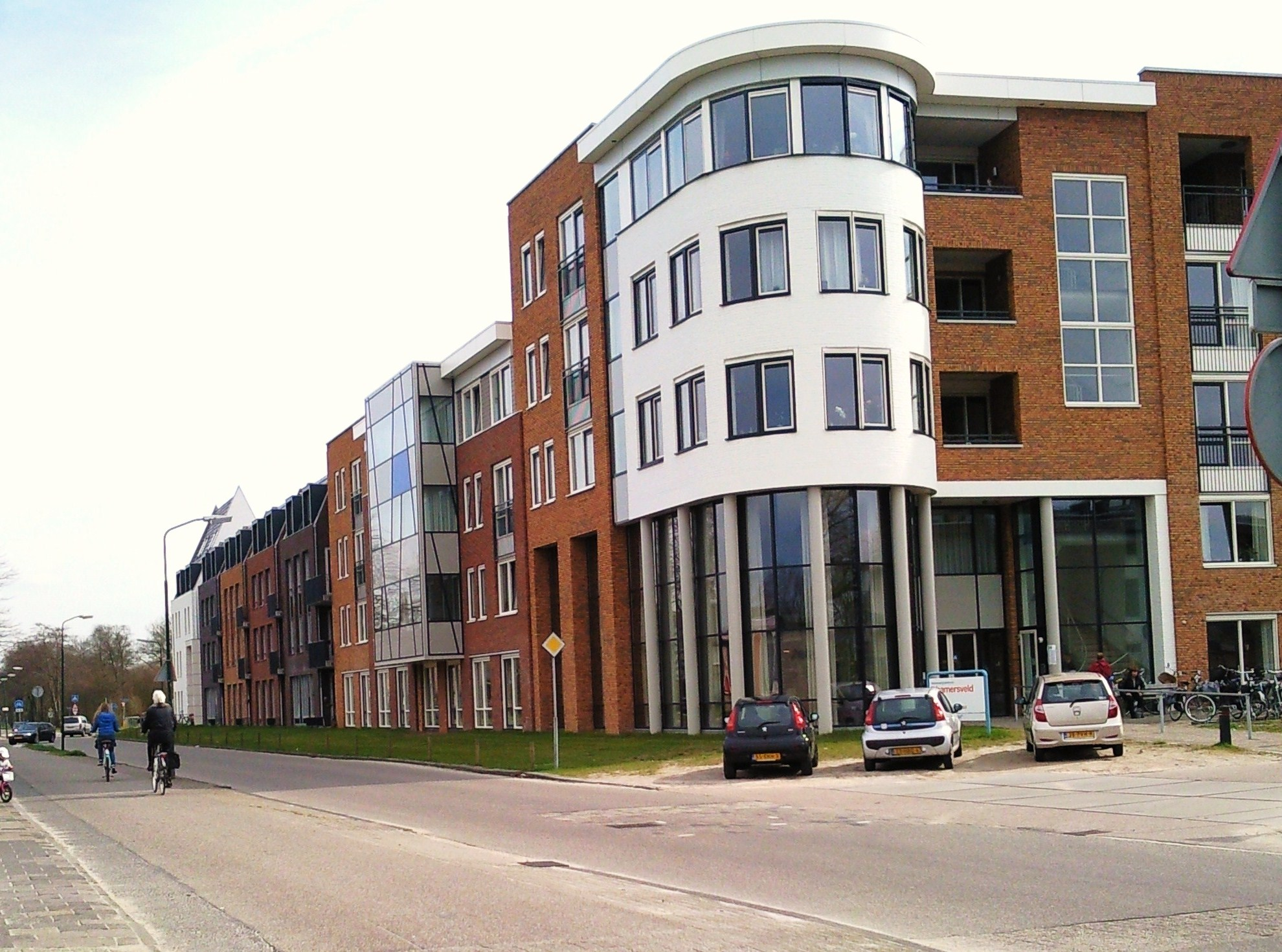
Newer part of the city, near a shopping centre

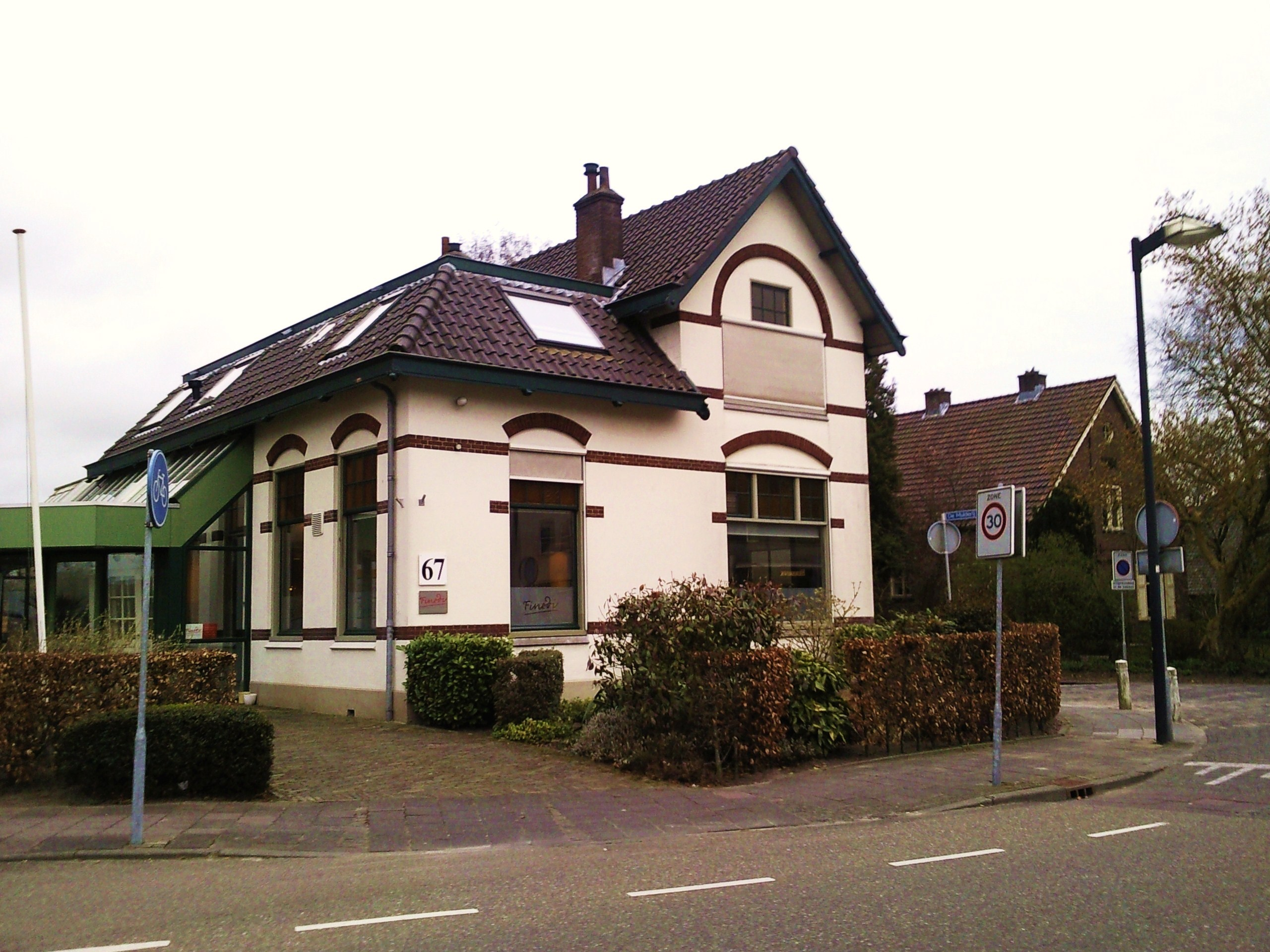
Old villa in the center

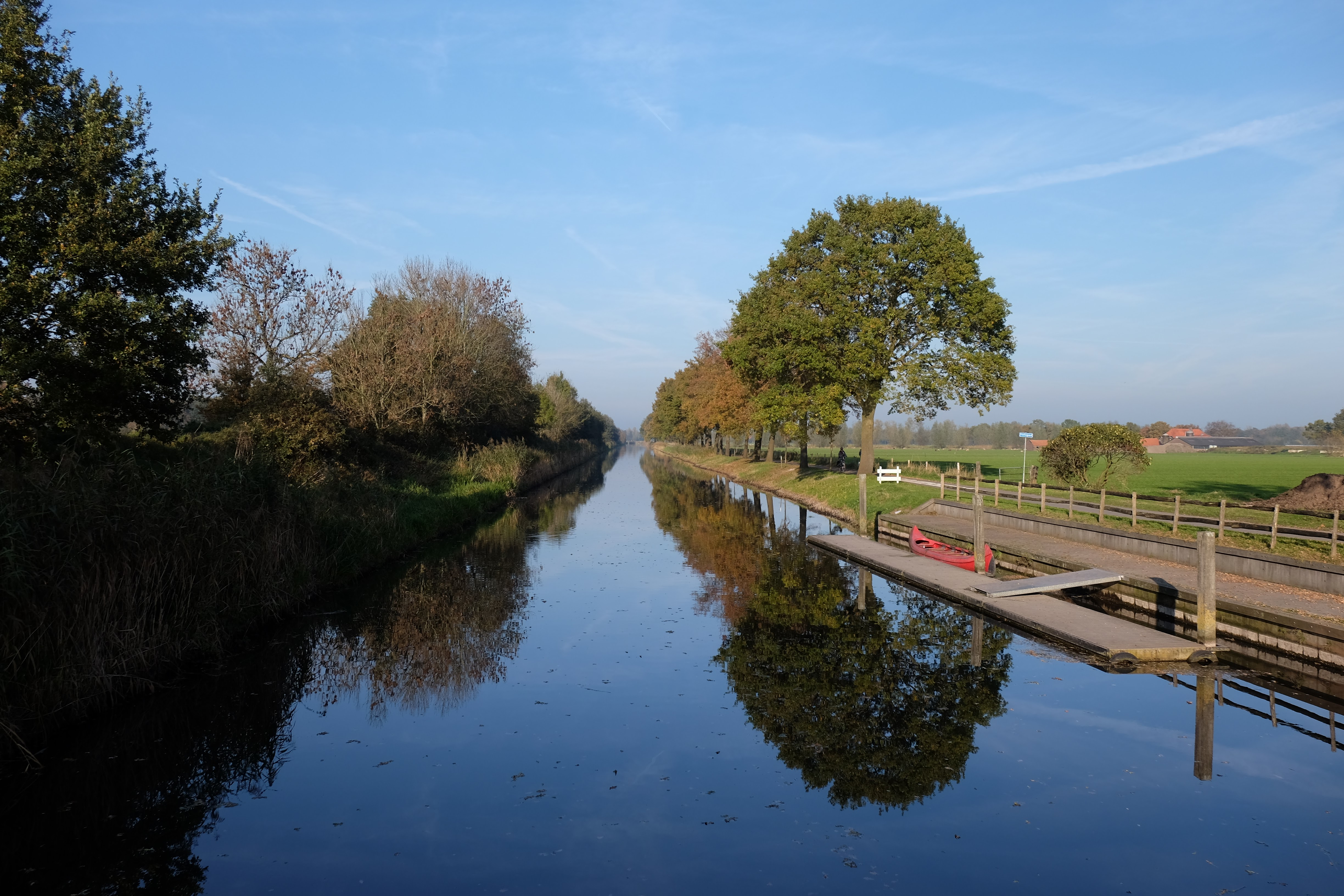
Leusden, panoramio

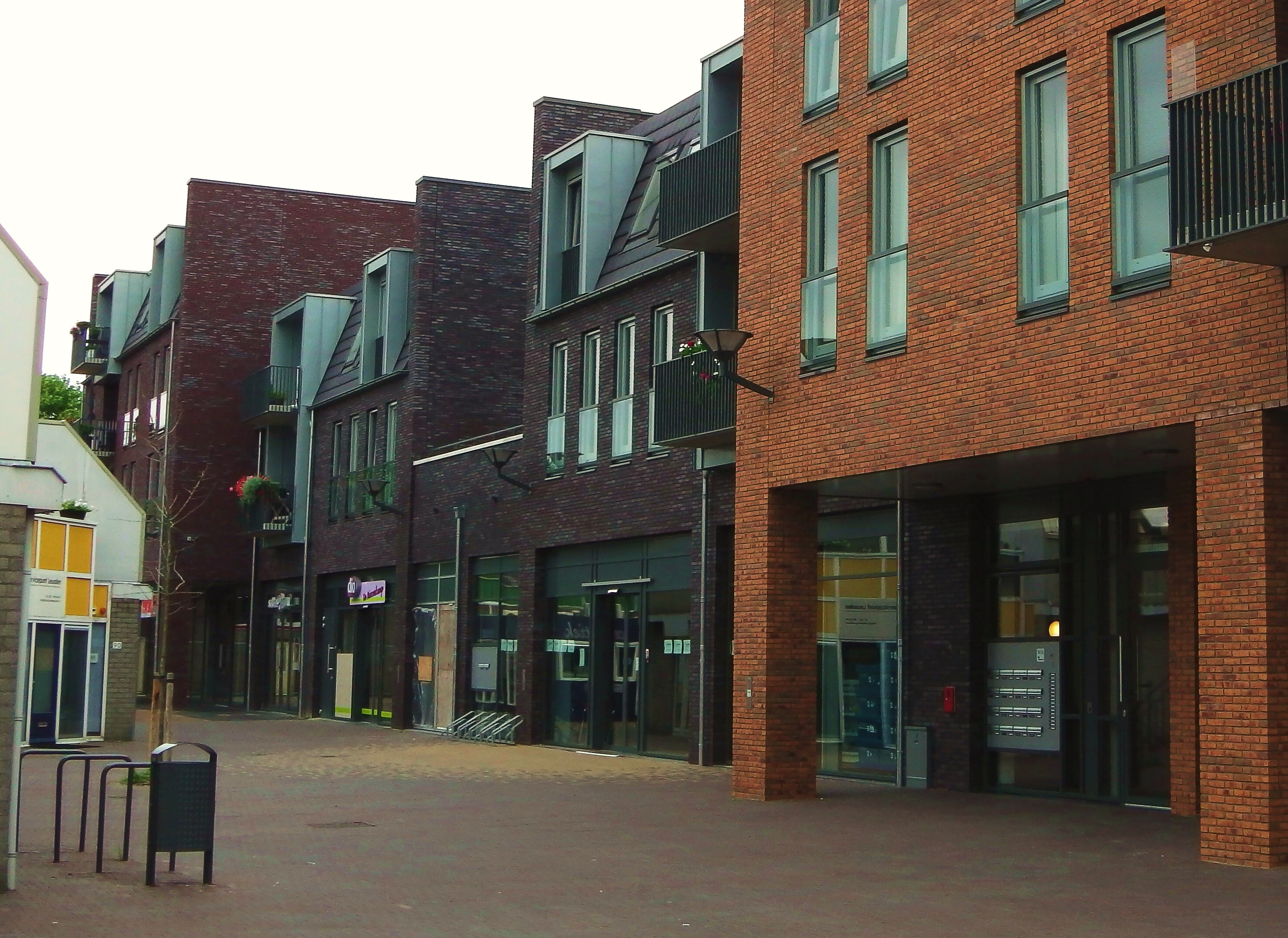
Shopping centre, Biezenkamp

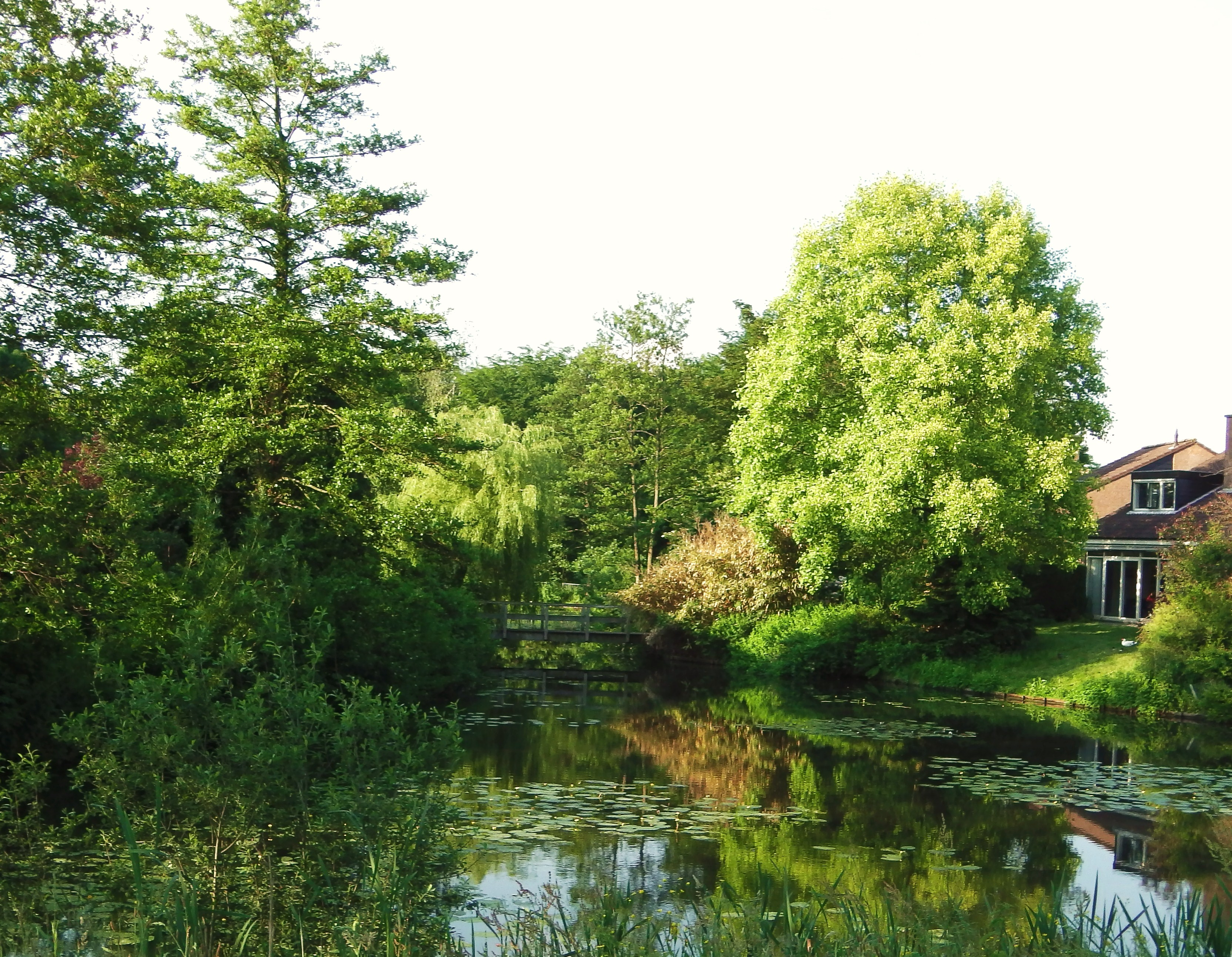
Park Wildenburg in Leusden

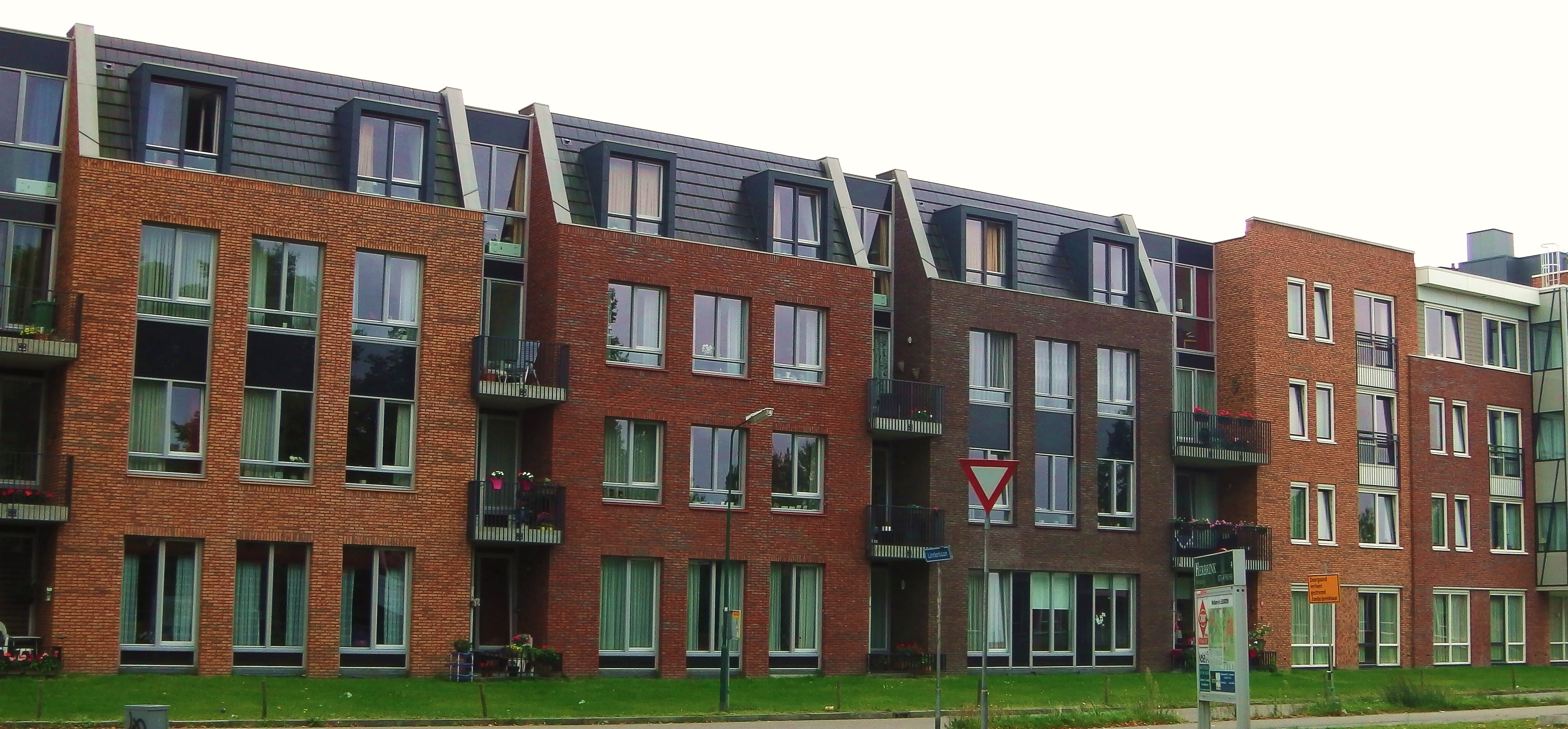
Row of new houses in the centre of Leusden

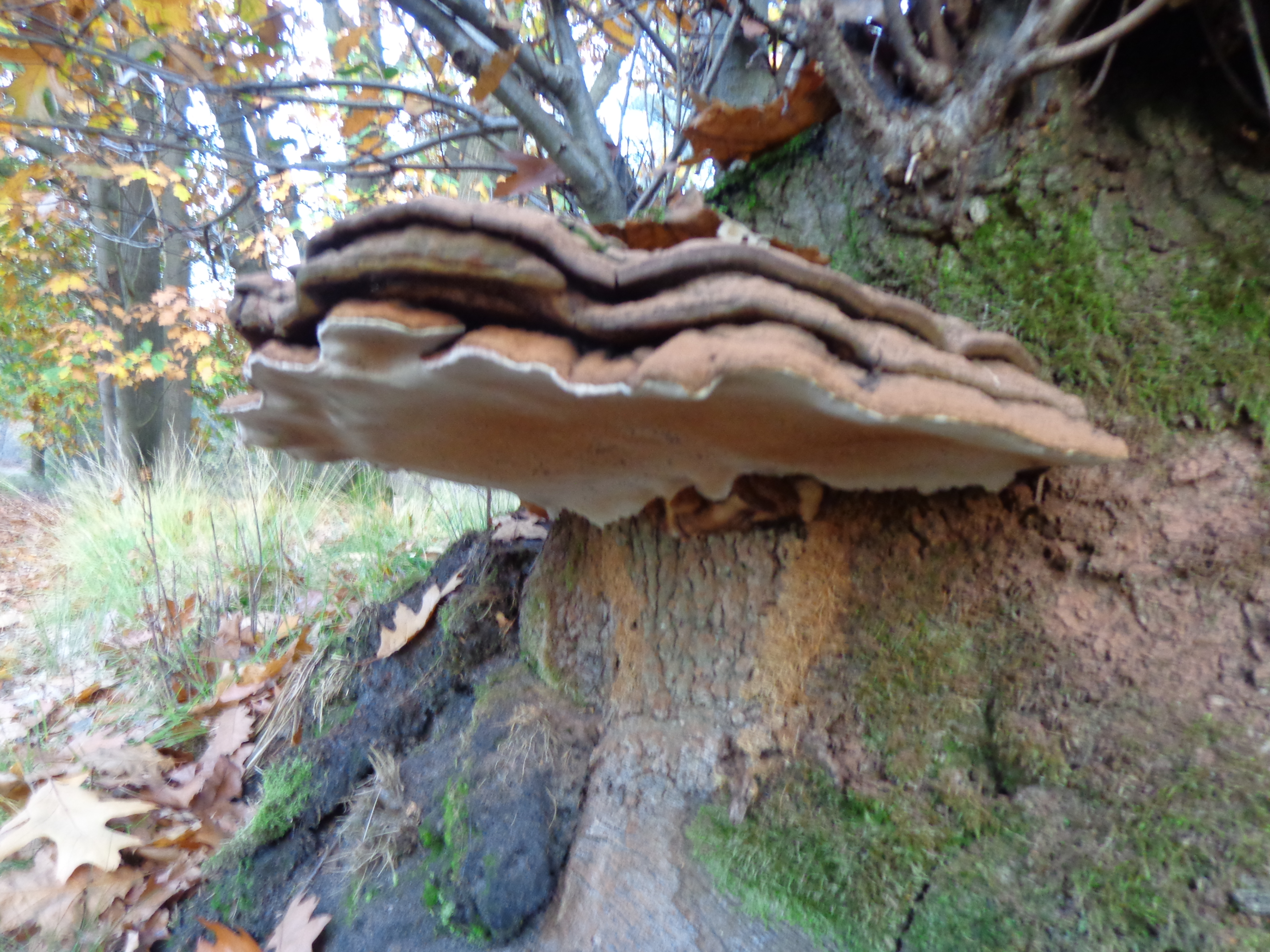
Paddestoelen op de Leusderheide 2019
