= List of British National films =

This is a list of films released by the British studio British National Films between 1935 and 1948. The company was financially backed by Lady Yule, and during the 1940s production was overseen by John Baxter and subsequently by Louis H. Jackson. Many of the films produced by the company were made at the British National Studios at Elstree.

== 1930s ==
Title	Release date	Director	Notes
Turn of the Tide	October 1935	Norman Walker	
Debt of Honour	November 1936	Norman Walker	
The Street Singer	November 1937	Jean de Marguenat	
Mr. Reeder in Room 13	February 1938	Norman Lee	
Meet Mr. Penny	June 1938	David MacDonald	
Lassie from Lancashire	August 1938	John Paddy Carstairs	
Night Journey	December 1938	Oswald Mitchell	
Dead Men Tell No Tales	December 1938	David MacDonald	
Spies of the Air	March 1939	David MacDonald	
Secret Journey	May 1939	John Baxter	
What Would You Do, Chums?	August 1939	John Baxter	
Old Mother Riley Joins Up	October 1939	Maclean Rogers	

== 1940s ==
Title	Release date	Director	Notes
Laugh It Off	March 1940	John Baxter	
The Second Mr. Bush	April 1940	John Paddy Carstairs	
Contraband	May 1940	Michael Powell	
Gaslight	June 1940	Thorold Dickinson	
Old Mother Riley in Society	July 1940	John Baxter	
Love on the Dole	April 1941	John Baxter	
Old Mother Riley in Business	April 1941	John Baxter	
Crook's Tour	May 1941	John Baxter	
Old Mother Riley's Ghosts	June 1941	John Baxter	
This England	July 1941	David MacDonald	
"Pimpernel" Smith	July 1941	Leslie Howard	
Old Mother Riley's Circus	December 1941	Thomas Bentley	
The Common Touch	December 1941	John Baxter	
Those Kids from Town	January 1942	Lance Comfort	
The Seventh Survivor	January 1942	Leslie Hiscott	
Penn of Pennsylvania	January 1942	Lance Comfort	
One of Our Aircraft Is Missing	April 1942	Michael Powell	
Let the People Sing	August 1942	John Baxter	
Salute John Citizen	August 1942	Maurice Elvey	
Sabotage at Sea	September 1942	Leslie Hiscott	
Lady from Lisbon	September 1942	Leslie Hiscott	
Asking for Trouble	September 1942	Oswald Mitchell	
We'll Smile Again	December 1942	John Baxter	
Old Mother Riley Overseas	1943	Oswald Mitchell	
When We Are Married	March 1943	Lance Comfort	
Old Mother Riley Detective	May 1943	Lance Comfort	
Theatre Royal	July 1943	John Baxter	
The Dummy Talks	October 1943	Oswald Mitchell	
The Shipbuilders	December 1943	John Baxter	
Strawberry Roan	1944	Maurice Elvey	
Candles at Nine	1944	John Harlow	
Heaven Is Round the Corner	April 1944	Maclean Rogers	
Welcome, Mr. Washington	May 1944	Leslie Hiscott	
Medal for the General	July 1944	Maurice Elvey	
The World Owes Me a Living	January 1945	Vernon Sewell	
Meet Sexton Blake!	February 1945	John Harlow	
Twilight Hour	February 1945	Paul L. Stein	
Give Me the Stars	May 1945	Maclean Rogers	
Don Chicago	August 1945	Maclean Rogers	
Waltz Time	August 1945	Paul L. Stein	
The Agitator	September 1945	John Harlow	
Latin Quarter	October 1945	Vernon Sewell	
Murder in Reverse	October 1945	Montgomery Tully	
The Echo Murders	December 1945	John Harlow	
Old Mother Riley at Home	December 1945	Oswald Mitchell	
The Trojan Brothers	February 1946	Maclean Rogers	
Lisbon Story	February 1946	Paul L. Stein	
Loyal Heart	February 1946	Oswald Mitchell	
Bedelia	May 1946	Lance Comfort	
Meet the Navy	September 1946	Alfred Travers	
The Laughing Lady	October 1946	Paul L. Stein	
Appointment with Crime	November 1946	John Harlow	
Spring Song	December 1946	Montgomery Tully	
Woman to Woman	February 1947	Maclean Rogers	
Green Fingers	June 1947	John Harlow	
Dual Alibi	June 1947	Alfred Travers	
The Ghosts of Berkeley Square	October 1947	Vernon Sewell	
Mrs. Fitzherbert	December 1947	Montgomery Tully	
The Three Weird Sisters	February 1948	Daniel Birt	
Counterblast	May 1948	Paul L. Stein	
Uneasy Terms	June 1948	Vernon Sewell	
No Room at the Inn	October 1948	Daniel Birt	

== Bibliography ==
- Murphy, Robert. Realism and Tinsel: Cinema and Society in Britain 1939-48. Routledge, 1989.
- Wood, Linda. British Films, 1927–1939. British Film Institute, 1986.

== See also ==
- List of Gainsborough Pictures films
- List of Ealing Studios films
- List of Stoll Pictures films
- List of British Lion films
- List of British and Dominions films
- List of Two Cities Films
- List of General Film Distributors films
- List of Paramount British films
