= British National Films Company =

Film production company

- Industry: Film industry
- Founded: 1934; 92 years ago in England
- Founder: J. Arthur Rank; Lady Annie Henrietta Yule; John Corfield
- Defunct: April 1948

The British National Films Company was formed in England in 1934 by J. Arthur Rank, Lady Annie Henrietta Yule of Bricket Wood, and producer John Corfield. Rank soon left the company but it continued to operate until the 1940s, funding mostly low budget films, but also some classics of British cinema such as Gaslight and One of Our Aircraft is Missing.

== Origin ==
Joseph Arthur Rank was a devout member of the Wesleyan Methodist Church and the son of a millionaire flour miller. On the first day of the week, he was a Sunday school teacher, and he discovered that if he screened religious films instead of lecturing his class, he got a positive response. His idea spread to other classes held by other churches, and in 1933 this motivated Rank to form the Religious Film Society to distribute the films that he wanted to show to other Sunday schools.

Following distribution, Rank then decided to go into the business of producing religious films. Mastership was his first religious film production. It was a twenty-minute film made at Merton Park Studios at a cost of £2,700. Mastership was never shown commercially, because it was merely intended as a form of evangelism and shown within other churches. Rank was pleased with the results, and other films went into production in Elstree at the better-equipped Rock Studios, which were later renamed British National.

=== Press challenge ===
In the 1930s, the Methodist Times newspaper in England began attacking the low moral standards exhibited by British films, and by American films shown in Britain. In response, the London Evening News answered the Methodist Times by suggesting that if the Methodist Church was so concerned about the effect that the film industry was having upon family life in Britain, it should start producing its own family-friendly films. It was this exchange that motivated Rank to expand his film interests into the commercial market.

=== Lady Yule ===
A young producer named John Corfield introduced Rank to Lady Annie Henrietta Yule of Bricket Wood, who was extremely wealthy. In order to fill her life with activity, she engaged in big game hunting and breeding Arabian horses with a degree of success and lasting fame; her Hanstead Stud won international recognition. She also commissioned luxury yachts, including the Nahlin, which she chartered in 1936 to the new king, Edward VIII. Upon meeting Rank, she decided to add the making of films to her list. However, when it came to the business side of film production, Lady Yule did not share the same ideas as Rank with regard to making and distributing films to improve society; she did not believe in giving discounts to religiously motivated film productions. She thought that films were an interesting hobby, and similar to her financial interests in Arabian horse breeding.

=== Formation of the company ===
In 1934, Rank, Lady Yule and John Corfield formed the British National Films Company and went into production in answer to the challenge by the Evening News.

British National's first feature film was Turn of the Tide, which was released in 1935. The script was based upon a 1932 novel by Leo Walmsley called Three Fevers. The setting, which Rank knew from childhood, was Robin Hood's Bay on the north coast of Yorkshire, England. Having read the book, Rank decided that it would make an excellent family-friendly British film in answer to the Hollywood-style films that Alexander Korda was making at the Denham Film Studios.

Although Turn of the Tide featured a good cast, British National were unable to gain wide distribution for the film, and when they did, it was as the second half of a double feature. The company struggled to recoup its costs. Rank knew that for British National to make a profit, he had to create a commercial version of his Religious Film Society to control distribution and exhibition.

Norman Walker, who directed Turn of the Tide, made a second film for British National, Debt of Honour (1936). Other films planned at the time were The Forbidden Road, based on a book by HL Meyers, and the story of Madame Tussaud.

In May 1936, it was announced that British National would make six films a year for 20th Century Fox, but this did not appear to happen.

=== Pinewood Film Studios ===
In 1934, Charles Boot had undertaken to construct a new film studio in the village of Iver Heath in Buckinghamshire. His location was set among the pine trees on the estate grounds of a mansion called Heatherden Hall that Boot had recently bought at auction. The complex was named Pinewood Film Studios and was completed within a year. By 1935, Boot had approached British National about taking over ownership and management of the new studios, and a contract was entered into. Corfield eventually resigned from the board of Pinewood Film Studios, and Lady Yule sold her shares to Rank.

Corfield and Yule continued British National without Rank.

== Resumption of production ==
British National resumed production with The Street Singer (1937), a musical with Arthur Tracy. It was followed by Mr. Reeder in Room 13 (1938), from an Edgar Wallace story; Meet Mr. Penny (1938) from director David MacDonald based on a radio series, intended to be the first in a series (that did not eventuate); Lassie from Lancashire (1938), a musical with Marjorie Brown; Night Journey (1938), a crime drama.

Dead Men Tell No Tales (1938) was a crime drama that performed strongly at the box office. Spies of the Air (1939) was an espionage film released prior to the outbreak of war. Most of these films were released by Associated British.

== Anglo-American Film Corporation ==
In June 1939 British National via John Cornfeld signed a deal with Anglo American Film Company, headed by Louis Jackson, for it to distribute the movies. By this stage Anglo American had four films in pre production: Mr Walker Wants to Know, which became What Would You Do, Chums?; Sons of the Sea, a film about the Navy; Old Mother Riley Joins Up; and Gaslight. These would be made by British National, except for Sons of the Sea.

British National's first film distributed by Anglo American was Secret Journey (1939) which came out after war had been declared. What Would You Do, Chums? (1939) was a comedy with Syd Walker. Old Mother Riley Joins Up (1939) was part of the Old Mother Riley series, which would be made at British National for the next decade.

== World War Two ==
Over the first four and a half years of the company's existence, it made twelve films. When the war started, it began making nine films a year. According to Kinematograph Weekly, "Variety will be the keynote of this new ambitious programme with one object in mind—that of making real, honest-to-goodness entertainment."

In November 1939, John Corfeld announced that British National would re-open its studios and start a programme of continuous production, with five films: Laugh it Off (1940), a comedy with Tommy Trinder; This German Freedom (which was never made); Blackout, a thriller (which became Contraband); Gaslight and an Old Mother Riley film (which became Old Mother Riley in Society). Gaslight became British National's best known early films.

British National also made Crook's Tour (1940) and The Second Mr. Bush (1940).

In late 1940, Corfield left the company, and was replaced as head of production by Louis H. Jackson.

British National began producing more elaborate films, such as Love on the Dole (1941), with Deborah Kerr; This England (1941); "Pimpernel" Smith (1941) with Leslie Howard; and Penn of Pennsylvania (1941). The studio alternated this with lower budgeted projects, notably the Old Mother Riley series: Old Mother Riley in Business (1941), Old Mother Riley's Ghosts (1941). In January 1941, Kinematograph Weekly reported "British National is probably the busiest production company in the country." The same month, G.W. Parish of British National declared:

It is the intention of my board to try to live up to everything implied in our name of British National, to maintain as high a standard as possible in our productions, to give continuity of employment to British film personnel and to provide restful, interesting, amusing and muchn eeded entertainment for the public with regard to the coming New Year.. continuity of production must be our objective, and, notwithstanding all the difficulties that the Industry will face during 1941, I feel confident that every effort will be made by all concerned to maintain and strengthen this great national work.

In February 1941, British National announced that since July 1939 it had made twelve films at a cost of £225,000, all of which had been "renumerative" for the company.

In July 1941, British National announced four new films, including Old Mother Riley's Cricus, One of Our Aircraft is Missing, and Let the People Sing.

Following the end of production on Penn of Pennsylvania in April 1942, British National ceased production for six weeks to give its staff a break, before resuming again with The Common Touch (1942). Kine Weekly wrote, "since the war, British National has spent over a quarter of a million and has an unbroken record of hits... a record in such difficult times of which anyone might be proud."

The studio had a big hit with the war movie One of Our Aircraft Is Missing (1942), and its other war films included Salute John Citizen (1942) and Sabotage at Sea (1942).

=== Shift in policy ===
In early 1942, British National shifted its policy, making fewer war movies and more light entertainment films. Examples of the latter included Let the People Sing (1942), Lady from Lisbon (1942), Asking for Trouble (1942), We'll Smile Again (1942), Old Mother Riley Overseas (1943), When We Are Married (1943), Old Mother Riley Detective (1943), Theatre Royal (1943),

The studio made The Dummy Talks (1943), a crime film; The Shipbuilders (1943), a drama; Strawberry Roan (1944), a romance; Candles at Nine (1944), a mystery film starring Jessie Matthews.

In 1944, regular director John Baxter left the company to set up his own company. In March 1945, Lady Yule criticised spending in the film industry.

In December 1945, Anglo was called the "number one independent British renters".

Vernon Sewell directed several films for the company. He later said, "I could do what I liked with Lady Yule... I could have run the studio, she would have given me the whole lot. She would have given me a Rolls Royce if I'd wanted it, she ate out of my hand for some unknown reason."

== Associated British ==
In January 1947, Anglo American was bought by Associated British Picture Corporation for a reported $1 million. Variety reported that the deal was to ensure British National pictures for Associated British's cinemas, writing "British National is good for nine films yearly and practically solves ABC's [Associated British Cinema's] quota problem. Circuit plays no pix of J. Arthur Rank, chief British film producer."

In August 1947, Lou Jackson announced British National would start a new slate of films, beginning with Death of a Rat, which became Counterblast.

In October, Jackson said, "I quite agree that production quality is essential, but I still maintain that the time it has taken to get this quality is not justified in the final result...the only way we can develop new stars is to put them into enough pictures, and I think it is wrong to spend £200,000 or more on a completely unknown artiste. A large number of technicians will not agree with me."

=== Ending ===
British National soon wound up and shut down in April 1948, after finishing No Room at the Inn. Vernon Sewell recalled the ending of the studio was sudden. "They gave everybody a fortnight's notice... It was sold to the BBC." He claimed Yule "got fed-up with it! Annoyed with Lou Jackson, annoyed with me, for not telling her the stories... She died shortly afterwards and so did her daughter, her daughter died quite young."

In 1947, United Artists reported, "Lady Yule, who financed this proposition [British National], is not particularly interested in putting up further money for Mr. Jackson to make pictures as ther have not been turning out particularly well as Jackson doesn't make a good picture."

Variety reported in April 1948 that Lady Yule "has lost close to $1,000,000, is in disagreement with the producer [Lou Jackson], and refuses to finance further films. Jackson cannot find other finance, and closure is temporary until an-other tenant goes in."

== Select credits ==
- Big Ben
- Polonaise
- The Canon in Residence
- Battle for Music (1944)

== 1930s ==
Title	Release date	Director	Notes
Turn of the Tide	October 1935	Norman Walker	First feature
Debt of Honour	November 1936	Norman Walker	Based on original story by Sapper
The Street Singer	November 1937	Jean de Marguenat	Musical vehicle for Arthur Tracy
Mr. Reeder in Room 13	February 1938	Norman Lee	
Meet Mr. Penny	June 1938	David MacDonald	
Lassie from Lancashire	August 1938	John Paddy Carstairs	
Night Journey	December 1938	Oswald Mitchell	
Dead Men Tell No Tales	December 1938	David MacDonald	
Spies of the Air	March 1939	David MacDonald	
Secret Journey	May 1939	John Baxter	
What Would You Do, Chums?	August 1939	John Baxter	
Old Mother Riley Joins Up	October 1939	Maclean Rogers	

== 1940s ==
Title	Release date	Director	Notes
Laugh It Off	March 1940	John Baxter	First film made after declaration of war; Tommy Trinder comedy
The Second Mr. Bush	April 1940	John Paddy Carstairs	Originally filmed in 1938
Contraband	May 1940	Michael Powell	Originally called Blackout
Gaslight	June 1940	Thorold Dickinson	
Old Mother Riley in Society	July 1940	John Baxter	
Crook's Tour	September 1940	John Baxter	Charters and Cauldicott comedy
Old Mother Riley in Business	November 1940	John Baxter	
Love on the Dole	April 1941	John Baxter	
Old Mother Riley's Ghosts	June 1941	John Baxter	
This England	July 1941	David MacDonald	
"Pimpernel" Smith	July 1941	Leslie Howard	
Old Mother Riley's Circus	December 1941	Thomas Bentley	
The Common Touch	December 1941	John Baxter	
Those Kids from Town	January 1942	Lance Comfort	
The Seventh Survivor	January 1942	Leslie Hiscott	
Penn of Pennsylvania	January 1942	Lance Comfort	
One of Our Aircraft Is Missing	April 1942	Michael Powell	
Let the People Sing	August 1942	John Baxter	
Salute John Citizen	August 1942	Maurice Elvey	
Sabotage at Sea	September 1942	Leslie Hiscott	
Lady from Lisbon	September 1942	Leslie Hiscott	
Asking for Trouble	September 1942	Oswald Mitchell	
We'll Smile Again	December 1942	John Baxter	
Old Mother Riley Overseas	1943	Oswald Mitchell	
When We Are Married	March 1943	Lance Comfort	
Old Mother Riley Detective	May 1943	Lance Comfort	
Theatre Royal	July 1943	John Baxter	
The Dummy Talks	October 1943	Oswald Mitchell	
The Shipbuilders	December 1943	John Baxter	
Strawberry Roan	1944	Maurice Elvey	
Candles at Nine	1944	John Harlow	
Heaven Is Round the Corner	April 1944	Maclean Rogers	
Welcome, Mr. Washington	May 1944	Leslie Hiscott	
Medal for the General	July 1944	Maurice Elvey	
The World Owes Me a Living	January 1945	Vernon Sewell	
Meet Sexton Blake!	February 1945	John Harlow	
Twilight Hour	February 1945	Paul L. Stein	
Give Me the Stars	May 1945	Maclean Rogers	
Don Chicago	August 1945	Maclean Rogers	
Waltz Time	August 1945	Paul L. Stein	
The Agitator	September 1945	John Harlow	
Latin Quarter	October 1945	Vernon Sewell	
Murder in Reverse?	October 1945	Montgomery Tully	
The Echo Murders	December 1945	John Harlow	
Old Mother Riley at Home	December 1945	Oswald Mitchell	
The Trojan Brothers	February 1946	Maclean Rogers	
Lisbon Story	February 1946	Paul L. Stein	
Loyal Heart	February 1946	Oswald Mitchell	
Bedelia	May 1946	Lance Comfort	
Meet the Navy	September 1946	Alfred Travers	
The Laughing Lady	October 1946	Paul L. Stein	
Appointment with Crime	November 1946	John Harlow	
Spring Song	December 1946	Montgomery Tully	
Woman to Woman	February 1947	Maclean Rogers	
Green Fingers	June 1947	John Harlow	
Dual Alibi	June 1947	Alfred Travers	
The Ghosts of Berkeley Square	October 1947	Vernon Sewell	
Mrs. Fitzherbert	December 1947	Montgomery Tully	
The Three Weird Sisters	February 1948	Daniel Birt	
Counterblast	May 1948	Paul L. Stein	
Uneasy Terms	June 1948	Vernon Sewell	
No Room at the Inn	October 1948	Daniel Birt	

== See also ==
- List of British National films
