= The Second Mr. Bush =

1940 film

- Directed by: John Paddy Carstairs
- Written by: Doreen Montgomery; Leslie Arliss
- Based on: play Stafford Dickens
- Produced by: John Corfield
- Starring: Wallace Evennett; Evelyn Roberts; Kay Walsh
- Cinematography: James Wilson
- Production company: British National Films
- Distributed by: Anglo-American Film Corporation
- Release date: April 1940
- Running time: 56 minutes
- Country: United Kingdom
- Language: English

The Second Mr. Bush is a 1940 British comedy film directed by John Paddy Carstairs and starring Wallace Evennett, Evelyn Roberts and Kay Walsh. It was written by Doreen Montgomery and Leslie Arliss based on the 1938 play by Stafford Dickens, and was made at Welwyn Studios by British National Films.

== Plot ==
Tony, an author living in a caravan for inspiration, provides a hiding place for Mr. Bush, a man fleeing a relentless pack of reporters. Bush, a shy New Zealand butterfly farmer, has recently inherited a fortune but has been plagued by unwanted celebrity since arriving in the country. To help him escape the attention, Tony offers to swap identities and stage a public display of giving all the money away. As part of the ruse, Tony moves in with a greedy family in financial straits. While he successfully carries out the plan and falls in love with their daughter, Angela, his scheme is thrown into chaos when Mr. Bush’s furious wife suddenly appears in search of her husband.

== Cast ==
- Wallace Evennett as Mr. Bush
- Evelyn Roberts as Major Dawson
- Kay Walsh as Angela Windel-Todd
- Derrick De Marney as Tony
- Barbara Everest as Mrs. Windel-Tod
- Ruth Maitland as Mrs. Bush
- Kenneth Buckley as David
- A. Bromley Davenport as Colonel Barlow
- Hal Walters as Joe
- W.T. Hodge as David's brother
- Vi Kaley
- Robert Rendel
- Margaret Yarde

== Production ==
British National originally bought the rights to the story in early 1938 as a vehicle for Richard Goolden who made Meet Mr. Penny for the studio. Filming took place in July 1938 at Welwyn Studios under the title If You Had a Million. However the film was not released until May 1940 under the title The Second Mr Bush.

== Reception ==
The Monthly Film Bulletin wrote: "A hurried tempo is maintained throughout. The acting is not outstanding but the film as a whole is amusing."

The Daily Telegraph said there were "one or two very funny moments" but felt "the play as a whole was a trite and ordinary piece of work, badly put together and written without much feeling for character or sense of plausibility."

Variety called it "too flimsy to hold attention."
