= This Man Is Mine (1946 film) =

British comedy

- Directed by: Marcel Varnel
- Written by: Mabel Constanduros; David Evans; Norman Lee; Doreen Montgomery; Nicholas Phipps; Val Valentine
- Based on: A Soldier for Christmas by Reginald Beckwith
- Produced by: Marcel Varnel
- Starring: Tom Walls; Glynis Johns; Jeanne de Casalis
- Cinematography: Phil Grindrod
- Edited by: Douglas Robertson
- Music by: Allan Gray
- Production company: Columbia British Productions
- Distributed by: Columbia Pictures
- Release date: 2 December 1946
- Running time: 103 minutes
- Country: United Kingdom
- Language: English

This Man Is Mine (also known as Christmas Weekend) is a 1946 British comedy film directed by Marcel Varnel and starring Tom Walls, Glynis Johns and Jeanne de Casalis. The screenplay was by Mabel Constanduros, David Evans, Norman Lee, Doreen Montgomery|, Nicholas Phipps and Val Valentine based on the hit West End play A Soldier for Christmas by Reginald Beckwith. It concerns a Canadian soldier who is billeted with a British family for the Christmas holidays.

== Premise ==
The wealthy Ferguson family are planning a quiet Christmas at their home in the countryside of southern England. A series of disruptions begin with the arrival of the married elder daughter Brenda, who has fled her London home after a row with her husband. This is followed successively by Millie, a WAAF NAAFI girl who used to be a servant in the house, now being billeted there, and then Bill, a Canadian soldier Bill from a nearby base, who is sent by his Colonel as a punishment for getting into fights with British troops in answer to a goodwill invitation from Mrs Ferguson.

The scatty Mrs Ferguson expected the Colonel himself to arrive himself but takes Bill's arrival in her stride. Fear that the family will have no bird to cook for Christmas dinner is dispelled when they are deluged by gifts of turkeys from several different sources, ending up with far too many. Phoebe, the younger daughter of the house, had been previously showing some interest in their lodger Ronnie, a scientist. Having doubts about his offer of marriage, she develops a sudden infatuation with the strong, easygoing Canadian Bill. This provokes rivalry with Millie who is also attracted to Bill. The sardonic Ronnie finds himself pushed aside, and even when he saves Bill's life rescuing some mail stolen by a criminal gang, he allows the Canadian to be hailed as a hero and himself as a coward. Things come to a head after a dance at the Canadian base. Phoebe spends a long time in Bill's room, from which several other characters, particularly Millie and Mrs Ferguson, draw the worst implications. In fact they have just been talking things over. Before long Phoebe realises she really does love Ronnie. Brenda is then reconciled with her husband who arrives from London with yet another turkey.

In a postwar epilogue, Bill is back in Saskatoon, where he and Millie have been happily married for several years.

== Cast ==
- Tom Walls as Philip Ferguson
- Glynis Johns as Millie
- Jeanne de Casalis as Mrs Ferguson
- Hugh McDermott as Bill Mackenzie
- Nova Pilbeam as Phoebe Ferguson
- Barry Morse as Ronnie
- Rosalyn Boulter as Brenda Ferguson
- Ambrosine Phillpotts as Lady Daubney
- Mary Merrall as Mrs Jarvis
- Agnes Lauchlan as Cook
- Bernard Lee as James Nicholls
- Charles Victor as hijacker
- Bryan Herbert as hijacker
- Peter Gawthorne as businessman
- Cyril Smith as taxi driver
- Charles Farrell as Canadian Sergeant
- Natalie Lynn as Mrs. Mackenzie
- Leslie Dwyer as van driver

== Production ==
The film was shot at Pinewood Studios with sets designed by art director George Provis. It was the final film of French director Varnel, known for his many comedies featuring music hall stars including Will Hay and George Formby. Varnel died in a car accident following the shooting of the film.

== Reception ==
The Monthly Film Bulletin wrote: "his outstandingly bright British comedy finds humour in the irritating shortages of contemporary England. The dialogue sparkles throughout, and, although some of the lines have the double entendre reminiscent of Aldwych farce, humour is never allowed to drop to crudity."

Kine Weekly wrote: "The picture, unfolded in retrospect, has many facets – calf-love, suburban snobbery, family loyalty, and gangster stuff all figure in its happy pattern – and the salient gags follow through with maximum effect."

== Bibliography ==
- Baskin, Ellen & Enser, A. G. S. Enser's filmed books and plays: 1928–2001. Ashgate Publishing, 2003.
