= This England (film) =

- Contemporary trade advertisement
- Directed by: David MacDonald
- Written by: A.R. Rawlinson; Bridget Boland; Emlyn Williams
- Produced by: John Corfield
- Starring: John Clements; Constance Cummings; Emlyn Williams
- Cinematography: Mutz Greenbaum
- Music by: Richard Addinsell; Orchestration, Roy Douglas; Direction, Muir Mathieson
- Production company: British National Films
- Distributed by: World Pictures Corporation
- Release date: 19 July 1941
- Running time: 84 mins
- Country: United Kingdom
- Language: English

This England (also known as Our Heritage) is a 1941 British historical drama film directed by David MacDonald and starring John Clements, Constance Cummings and Emlyn Williams. It was written by A.R. Rawlinson, Bridget Boland and Williams.

== Plot ==
The film follows the small English village of Cleveley and its historic resistance against tyrannical invaders recounted by one of the inhabitants to a visiting American journalist.

== Partial cast ==
- John Clements as John Rookeby
- Constance Cummings as Ann
- Emlyn Williams as Appleyard
- Frank Pettingell as Gage
- Roland Culver as Steward
- Morland Graham as doctor
- Leslie French as Johnny
- Martin Walker as Seigneur
- Ronald Ward as Lord Clavely
- Hugh Wakefield as vicar
- Esmond Knight as vicar's son
- Amy Veness as Jenny
- Roddy McDowall as Hugo
- Dennis Wyndham as Martin

== Production ==
The film was made for propaganda purposes during the Second World War. Its title comes from a speech by John of Gaunt in the play Richard II by William Shakespeare.

Kinematograph Weekly called it British National's "most ambitious film to date".

The movie was made at the Rock Studios Elstree. It was shot during the height of the blitz in September 1940.

The cost of this film, Penn of Pennsylvania, Pimpernell Smith and Love on the Dole came to an estimated $1 million.

== Reception ==
Variety called it "Episodic, dramalog unwinds a tale around a centuries oid English village, tracing its life and the lives of its villagers from Norman times up to the present-day conflict. It’s superbly acted and presented with simplicity, but the absence of spectacle and the very obvious nature of its propaganda telling militates against its chances outside of the United Kingdom."

The Monthly Film Bulletin wrote: "This is a film of sentiment, and its film craftsmanship is entirely indistinguished, for its episodic structure robs it of constructional unity and dramatic momentum. In attempting to escape into past ages, simply by ringing the changes on costumes and wigs, it succeeds no better than other similar films have succeeded before it. It has been conceived theatrically and without a proper understanding of the limitations and possibilities of the film medium. Not even its production qualities are all that could be desired. That many of the landscapes are model shots, for example, will be obvious even to those unaccustomed to distinguish such niceties. On the credit side, the cast has worked conscientiously and competently, and Emlyn Williams' portrayal of the simple and intense sincerity of Appleyard is the one distinctive feature of the whole film."

Kine Weekly wrote: "pitch ts somfdent prog and the I ts ate es 5 is a prognostication of the future. In a word, it is England at her full, formidable stature. Excel-: lant general booking, one with immense exploitation angles."

Picture Show wrote: "The story is told through certain characters that run through the film in all the sequences – farm labourer and his master being the chief ones. These roles are powerfully played by Emlyn Williams and John Clements, and Constance Cummings, as the chief feminine character, also does excellent work. It is very well directed. Splendid, unusual entertainment."

In British Sound Films: The Studio Years 1928–1959 David Quinlan rated the film as "mediocre", writing: "A well-meant parade of aphorisms, model shots and prop beards supposedly good for morale."
