= Holiday's End =

- Directed by: John Paddy Carstairs
- Written by: Gerald Elliott
- Produced by: Anthony Havelock-Allan
- Starring: Wally Patch; Rosalyn Boulter; Henry Victor
- Cinematography: Desmond Dickinson
- Production company: British and Dominions
- Distributed by: Paramount British
- Release date: March 1937
- Running time: 70 minutes
- Country: United Kingdom
- Language: English

Holiday's End is a 1937 British mystery film directed by John Paddy Carstairs and starring Sally Stewart, Rosalyn Boulter and Wally Patch. It was written by Gerald Elliot, and was made at Pinewood Studios as a quota quickie. The film follows the arrival at boarding school of a boy king.

== Preservation status ==
The British Film Institute National Archive holds a collection of stills but no film or video materials.

== Plot ==
When the boy monarch of an East European state arrives at an English boarding school, a science master is found murdered. Suspicion falls on everyone, until the killer is exposed as a revolutionary, attempting to depose the young king.

== Cast ==
- Wally Patch as Sergeant Yerbury
- Sally Stewart as Betty Sulgrave
- Kenneth Buckley as Arthur Marsh
- Rosalyn Boulter as Joyce Deane
- Aubrey Mallalieu as Bellamy
- Leslie Bradley as Peter Hurst
- Beckett Bould as Philpotts
- Robert Field as Des Voeux
- Henry Victor as Major Zwanenberg
- Denis Cowles as Superintendent of Police
- Bruce Moir as Perks

== Reception ==
The Monthly Film Bulletin wrote: "The setting gives interest to a familiar type of plot and the prep school atmosphere is well conveyed. The entire cast gives creditable performances and Wally Patch is exceptionally good as the school sergeant. The direction keeps faithfully to the type of story and carries it along."

Kine Weekly wrote: "The story is not too convincing, but much of the character drawing is interesting, the locale is novel, and the direction is not without resource, and it is on these counts that it manages to promote agreeable popular entertainment. ...The film is at least off the beaten track."

The Daily Film Renter wrote: "Virile leading portrayal by Leslie Bradley and cockney comedy from Wally Patch are acting highlights."
