= Spring Song (1946 film) =

1946 film by Montgomery Tully

- American poster
- Directed by: Montgomery Tully
- Written by: Lore Cowan; Maurice Cowan; James Seymour; Montgomery Tully
- Produced by: Louis H. Jackson
- Starring: Peter Graves; Carol Raye; Leni Lynn
- Cinematography: Ernest Palmer
- Edited by: Monica Kimick
- Music by: Hans May
- Production company: British National Films
- Distributed by: Anglo-American Film Corporation
- Release date: 23 December 1946
- Running time: 80 minutes
- Country: United Kingdom
- Language: English
- Budget: $280,000

Spring Song (also known as Springtime) is a 1946 British musical drama film directed by Montgomery Tully and starring Peter Graves, Carol Raye and Leni Lynn. It was written by Lore Cowan, Maurice Cowan, James Seymour and Tully.

== Synopsis ==
The film follows the history of a brooch after it is given as a present by a man to a woman in 1911.

== Cast ==
- Peter Graves as Tony Winster
- Carol Raye as Janet Hill/Janet Ware
- Lawrence O'Madden as Johnnie Ware
- Leni Lynn as Vera Dale
- Netta Westcott as Lady Norchester
- Diana Calderwood as Mary Norchester
- David Horne as Sir Anthony
- Finlay Currie as Cobb
- Alan Wheatley as Menelli
- Peter Penn as Carrington
- Maire O'Neill as dresser
- Gerhard Kempinski as hotel manager
- Lois Maxwell as Penelope Cobb
- Jack Billings as dancer

== Production ==
The film was shot at the British National Studios in Elstree outside London, with sets designed by the art director Wilfred Arnold.

The jet plane scenes were flown by Geoffrey de Havilland.

== Reception ==
The Monthly Film Bulletin wrote: "Here is a stereotyped story told, mainly, in an unambitious way, although with some moments of charm and freshness, notably in the period scenes of Oxford in 1911. The whole film is enlivened, however, by the gay performance of Peter Graves (as Tony Winster), who reveals, throughout a seemingly carefree portrayal, an impeccable sense of timing and a real feeling for his lines."

Picture Show wrote: "Pleasant music, attractive staging, and some delightful dancing and singing add to its attractions. Agreeable entertainment."

Variety wrote: "Never pretending to be more than a modest film, it gives real entertainment value. ... On her showing here, Miss Raye establishes herself as top newcomer in British films. She appears destined to be a big topliner. Hollywood is certain to take more note of her than British producers have so far. Never has she danced better, her number "Give Me a Chance to Dance" (with Jack Billings) winning big applause. Peter Graves shows up as an important light comedian. May soon rank in popularity with David Niven, whom he slightly resembles. Lawrence O'Madden, grand character actor, wins great sympathy by his fine playing, and Leni Lynn displays her coloratura in a couple of songs that have been interpolated to show the range of her voice."
