= Cathleen Cordell =

American actress (1915–1997)

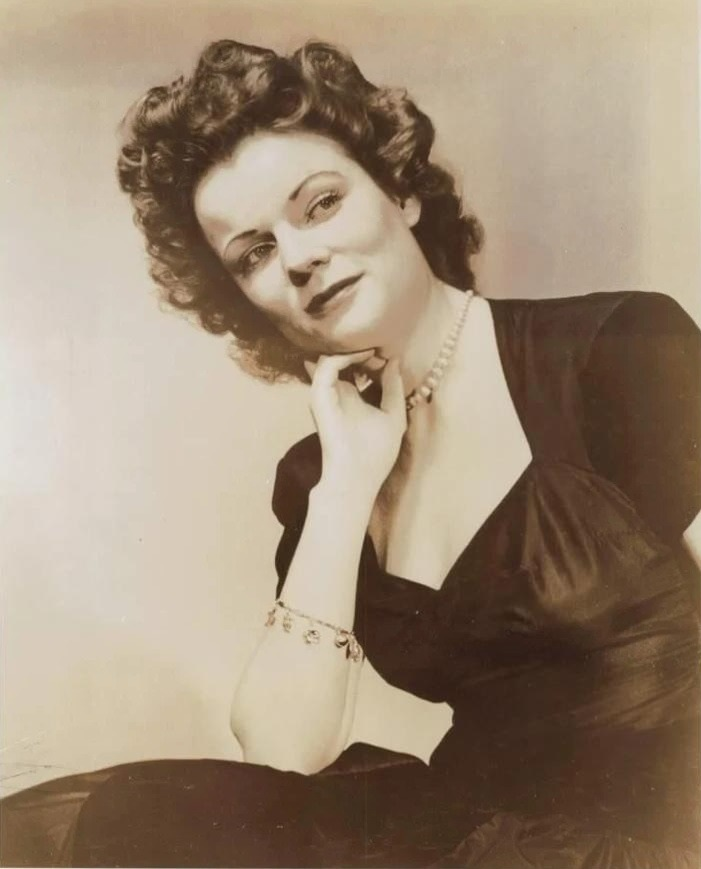
- Cordell in 1948
- Born: May 21, 1915; Brooklyn, New York, U.S.
- Died: August 19, 1997 (aged 82); Los Angeles, California, U.S.
- Occupations: Film, television actress
- Years active: 1938–1985

Cathleen Cordell (May 21, 1915 – August 19, 1997) was an American film and television actress. She was described as "a lass born in Brooklyn with an Irish name and an English accent; educated in India and France."

== Early years ==
Cordell was born in Brooklyn, New York. She moved to India, to England, then to France in order to begin her childhood education. "My father's business took him to India when I was a baby," she said, "Then we went to France, and when I was seven years old I was thrust into a French boarding school." She later attended the Royal Academy of Dramatic Art.

== Stage ==
Cordell's stage debut came in It's You I Want, presented by Seymour Hicks' company in England. Her "first important role" in the United States came in Never Trouble Trouble at the Brighton Theater in Brooklyn, New York, August 17, 1937. A Brooklyn newspaper described Cordell as "a 'discovery' of John Golden" and said the actress "has appeared abroad previously."

Cordell went on to appear on Broadway in Love of Women (1937), Romantic Mr. Dickens (1940), Golden Wings (1941), Yesterday's Magic (1942), Sheppey (1944), While the Sun Shines (1944), and The Linden Tree (1948).

== Film ==
Cordell began her film career in 1938 playing in Who Killed Cock Robin?. (Another source says she "made her film debut in the British version of Gaslight.") She starred in Gaslight (1940) with Anton Walbrook, as Nancy, the housemaid, a role that later launched Angela Lansbury into stardom in the American remake four years later.

She made numerous film and television appearances during her nearly 50-year career.

== Radio ==
Cordell was a member of the casts of Hilltop House (playing Vicky McLain), Amanda (playing Eve Fuller), Valiant Lady (playing Monica Brewster) and Counterspy and appeared in other programs, such as Quiet Please, Grand Central Station and The March of Time.

During World War II, Cordell lived in England and worked for the BBC.

== Television ==
Cordell appeared in two episodes of Perry Mason and Family Affair, and three times in Dragnet 1967, starring Jack Webb.

In 1963, she appeared as “Mrs. Lawson” in the S6E26 edition of Wagon Train in “The Michael Magoo Story”.

In 1970 she played Mrs. Beamish in “The Housekeeper” - Season 1 / Episode 1 of Rod Serling's, American anthology television series, Night Gallery.

== Later years ==
Cordell retired from acting in 1985 after appearing in the movie The Return of the Living Dead.

== Death ==
Cordell died on August 19, 1997, in Cedars-Sinai Medical Center, Los Angeles, at age 82.

== Radio appearances ==
Year	Program	Episode/source
1948	Quiet Please "Adam and the Darkest Day"	
1948	Grand Central Station	NA
1950	Playhouse of Favorites	The School for Scandal
1952	The FBI in Peace and War	The Trouble Shooter
1953	Theatre of Today	The Props

== Film appearances ==
Year	Title	Role	Notes
1938	Hey! Hey! USA	Susan, Johnson's girlfriend	Uncredited
1940	Gaslight	Nancy, parlour maid	
1941	Major Barbara	Mog Habbijam	
1964	The Unsinkable Molly Brown	Passenger	Uncredited
1968	Star!	Vendeuse	Uncredited
1970	MASH	Capt. Peterson - Nurse Corps	Uncredited
1970	Airport	Mrs. William Donovan, passenger	Uncredited
1974	Oliver Twist		Voice
1980	The Gong Show Movie	Lady in Elevator	
1985	The Return of the Living Dead	Ethel Glover, Colonel's Wife	(final film role)

== Television appearances ==
Year	Program	Episode/source	Role
1950	Armstrong Circle Theatre	"Happy Ending"	
1963	The Alfred Hitchcock Hour	Mrs. Spaulding	Season 1 Episode 18: "A Tangled Web"
1967	I Dream of Jeannie	"The Mod Party"	
1967	Batman	"The Unkindest Tut of All"	Librarian
