= Vic Oliver =

Austrian-born British actor and radio comedian (1898–1964)

- Born: Victor Oliver von Samek; 8 July 1898; Vienna, Austria-Hungary
- Died: 15 August 1964 (aged 66); Johannesburg, South Africa
- Resting place: Golders Green Crematorium, London, England
- Education: Vienna University
- Occupations: Entertainer; musician; actor; radio comedian
- Years active: 1919–1964
- Spouses: Sarah Millicent Hermione Churchill (m. 1936; div. 1945) Natalie Frances Conder (m. 1946)
- Children: 1
- Parent(s): Baron Viktor von Samek; Charlotte Wallner
- Military career
- Allegiance: Austro-Hungarian Empire
- Branch: Austro-Hungarian Army
- Conflicts: First World War

Victor Oliver von Samek (8 July 1898 – 15 August 1964) was an Austrian-born British musician, entertainer, comedian and actor, most popular between the 1920s and 1950s.

== Early life and musical career ==
He was born in Vienna into a Jewish family, the son of Baron Viktor von Samek. He played tennis, football and hockey as a youth and became junior tennis champion of Austria in 1914. He studied medicine at Vienna University but abandoned it for his first love, music. He had been acclaimed as a child prodigy on the violin, and for a time studied under Mahler. During the First World War he served in the Austrian cavalry as adjutant to Prince René of Bourbon-Parma, and at the end of the war escaped to France on a forged passport.

After the war he briefly worked as a banker and for a textile manufacturer, and performed as a drummer in a jazz band in Rouen and Le Havre. He travelled to the United States at the end of 1922, and played in vaudeville shows as a pianist and occasional vocalist. He joined a jazz group, The Nine Nights of Jazz, in 1923, and the following year formed a double act with violinist Margaret Crangle. After their act broke up, in 1927 he was appointed as conductor and compere of a travelling radio show in the U.S., with a portable transmitter.

== As a comedian and musician ==
In 1928, he reunited with Crangle. He discovered his gift for comedy by chance when he apologised to his audience after falling from a piano stool and found that his apologies "drew more laughs than did his accident". A new career as a comedian took him all over the United States. He reached the Palace Theatre, New York, then regarded as the pinnacle of the American vaudeville circuit, in 1929. Returning to England to perform with Crangle, he played the London Palladium two years later, and started to establish his reputation in Britain. With his deferential, modest humour, he became very popular, both in Britain and America, as a solo act, and gained a reputation as "a sophisticated if rather risqué cabaret artiste". He played the violin deliberately badly in his shows. By 1935, he was topping the bill at the London Palladium, and shared the record (with Max Miller) for appearances at the Holborn Empire.

He was principal comedian in C. B. Cochran's revue Follow the Sun at the Adelphi Theatre, where he met Winston Churchill's daughter Sarah. After Oliver returned to New York to play in the revue It's the Tops, Churchill joined him there and they were married amid much publicity on Christmas Day 1936. Winston Churchill did not approve of Oliver, who had been divorced at least once, possibly twice. Some thought there was negativity also towards those involved with music halls.

Oliver featured in a string of popular revues, just before and after the start of the Second World War, including Black and Blue, Black Velvet, and The Night and the Music. During the war he starred in the BBC radio show Hi, Gang! and appeared in many others, including Oliver Twist, Yankee Doodle Do, and Vic Oliver Introduces. He was Roy Plomley's first "castaway" guest on Desert Island Discs, on 29 January 1942. This lost broadcast was recalled in 2012 in a BBC radio documentary about Oliver's life in Britain.

He had aspirations as a conductor and in 1944 founded the Vic Oliver Concert Orchestra, which gave light classical concerts as well as complete opera performances. He toured with the orchestra, and in 1945, and again in 1952, appeared in the Royal Variety Performance. He featured in further London revues after the end of the war, and remained a popular comedian in pantomimes and on radio shows. He was a regular on Henry Hall's Guest Night and Workers' Playtime and, as a music-based comedian, has been considered a precursor of Victor Borge. In 1953 he established Variety Playhouse as a primetime radio show featuring music, comedy and light drama; the show did not survive him. In 1962 he appeared in Discord in Three Flats (1962) with Cicely Courtneidge and Jack Hulbert.

== Personal life and death ==
As a Jew, his name was reportedly listed on a Nazi blacklist (known as "The Black Book") of people to be arrested and killed immediately in the event of a successful German invasion of Britain. He became a naturalised British subject in 1948.

Oliver became a supporter of First Division club Brentford and was vice-president of the club in the early 1950s. He later became president of the Brentford Supporters' Club.

Oliver and Sarah Churchill divorced in 1945. It was noted that Oliver never capitalised on his relationship with Sarah Churchill, despite attractive offers. Oliver married Natalie Frances Conder in 1946 in Westminster, London, and they had one daughter.

He collapsed and died during a performance in Johannesburg, South Africa, in 1964, aged 66. Relatives still live in Vienna.

== Portrayal ==
Oliver was briefly portrayed in the 2002 film The Gathering Storm. He was played by Gerrard McArthur.

== Works ==
- Oliver, Vic (1954). Mr. Showbusiness: The autobiography of Vic Oliver (hardcover) (First ed.). London: Harrap.

== Filmography ==
- Rhythm in the Air (1936)
- Who's Your Lady Friend? (1937)
- Meet Mr. Penny (1938)
- Around the Town (1938)
- Room for Two (1940)
- Hi Gang! (1941)
- He Found a Star (1941)
- Give Us the Moon (1944)
- I'll Be Your Sweetheart (1945)
