= Counterblast =

1948 British film by Paul L. Stein

- Directed by: Paul L. Stein
- Written by: Guy Morgan; Jack Whittingham
- Produced by: Louis H. Jackson
- Starring: Robert Beatty; Mervyn Johns; Nova Pilbeam; Margaretta Scott
- Cinematography: Moray Grant; James Wilson
- Edited by: Joseph Sterling
- Music by: Hans May
- Production company: British National Films
- Distributed by: Pathé Pictures International
- Release date: 18 May 1948
- Running time: 99 minutes
- Country: United Kingdom
- Language: English

Counterblast (also known as Devil's Plot) is a 1948 British thriller film directed by Paul L. Stein and starring Robert Beatty, Mervyn Johns and Nova Pilbeam. It was written by Guy Morgan and Jack Whittingham, and made by British National Films at Elstree Studios.

== Plot ==
A Nazi scientist escapes from prison, murders a leading professor and takes his place at a research laboratory, where he experiments with biological warfare with which he intends to wage the next war against Britain.

== Cast ==
- Robert Beatty as Doctor Paul Rankin
- Mervyn Johns as Doctor Bruckner
- Nova Pilbeam as Tracy Hart
- Margaretta Scott as Sister Johnson
- Sybille Binder as Martha Lert, Bruckner's housekeeper
- Marie Lohr as Mrs Coles
- Karel Stepanek as Professor Inman
- Alan Wheatley as M.W. Kennedy
- Gladys Henson as Mrs Plum
- John Salew as Padre Latham
- Anthony Eustrel as Doctor Richard Forrester
- Carl Jaffe as Heinz
- Ronald Adam as Colonel Ingram
- Martin Miller as Van Hessian
- Aubrey Mallalieu as Major Walsh
- Olive Sloane as Ingram's housekeeper

== Production ==
The movie was part of a new film slate for British National.

Filming started in September 1947 under the title Death of a Rat and So Died a Rat. Opening scenes were shot at Colchester in an actual POW camp. The film was shot over eight weeks.

== Reception ==
The Monthly Film Bulletin wrote: "The story, which is not only topical but which also seems rather disturbingly plausible, offers plenty of scope to Mervyn Johns to display to the full his dramatic ability, and as Bruckner he makes the most of his opportunities. ... Robert Beatty renders strong Sipport as Rankin and Nova Pilbeam is well cast as Tracy."

Kine Weekly wrote: "Espionage romantic melodrama, built on solid rather than imaginative stage lines. ... A trifle far-fetched and over-long, it nevertheless holds the interest and sees that poetic justice spectacularly overtakes the villain in the end. The stars and supporting players are more than equal to their task and the staging has polish."

Picture Show wrote: "Can you believe in a German scientist escaping from a P.O.W. camp in England, murdering an English scientist, just arrived, from a ten-year stay in Australia, and taking his identity, to hold a responsible job at a scientific research station while he secretly continues his studies in bacterial warfare in preparation for the next Nazi war? If you can, you will probably enjoy this melodrama, for it is efficiently acted and convincingly set."

Reviewing the film during its US release in 1953 Variety called it "a heavy-handed British meller that is so filled with homicide it is a wonder the censors did not do much heavier pruning. Despite the pic’s many flaws, Paul L. Stein’s smooth direction manages to maintain siderable suspense."

In British Sound Films: The Studio Years 1928–1959 David Quinlan rated the film as "average", writing: "Holes in plot spoil nicely constructed idea."

The Radio Times Guide to Films gave the film 2/5 stars, writing: "Among the first films to consider Nazi experiments into germ warfare, this brisk British thriller boasts the interesting premise of turning a wanted war criminal into an accidental hero. ... This was an ambitious picture for its time."
