= Medal for the General =

- Godfrey Tearle (second from left) and Petula Clark (third from left) in a scene from the film
- Directed by: Maurice Elvey
- Written by: Elizabeth Baron; Based on the novel by James Ronald
- Produced by: Louis H. Jackson
- Starring: Godfrey Tearle; Jeanne de Casalis; Petula Clark
- Cinematography: Arthur Grant; James Wilson
- Edited by: Grace Garland
- Music by: William Alwyn
- Production company: British National Films Company
- Distributed by: Anglo-American Film Corporation (UK); Four Continents Films (US)
- Release date: 6 November 1944
- Running time: 100 minutes
- Country: United Kingdom
- Language: English

Medal for the General (US title: The Gay Intruders) is a 1944 British comedy film directed by Maurice Elvey and starring Godfrey Tearle and. Jeanne de Casalis. The screenplay by Elizabeth Baron was based on the novel of the same title by James Ronald (published in the U.S. under the title Old Soldiers Never Die).

== Plot ==
The title character is General Victor Church, a proud World War I veteran who lives alone in a large house with his WW1 batman, Bates, and a few servants. Church was highly decorated in WWI, including a Victoria Cross and the Distinguished Service Order.

At the onset of WW2 he goes to Whitehall to talk Major-General Lord Ottershaw (who was his adjutant in WW1) at the War Office to seek an active role in the War, after his numerous letters went unanswered. Despite their mutual respect, Ottershaw tells Church that he is too old, his experience out of date and that there was no vacancy for him. Church is subsequently ridiculed by some junior Army officers at his Club and although deflated, he decides to try and volunteer in the local Civil Defence organisations at the local town hall, but even they reject him. A woman at the town hall tries to be nice to him but her patronising comments simply make him feel old and useless. He becomes despondent and reclusive, cutting himself off from everyone and all news about the war. Eventually he takes to his bed and Bates becomes concerned about him. Bates arranges for an old friend of the General (Lady Frome) to visit along with the local doctor, but the General rejects all help and sends them away. As she leaves, Lady Frome tells Bates that she has an idea which may help.

The General then decides to go hunting for rabbits with his shotgun, but Bates becomes fearful that the General may attempt suicide with the shotgun and follows him. Whilst following, Bates observes the General pause and load the shotgun. Bates rushes in and disarms the General and encourages him to return home. On their arrival back at the house they find that Lady Frome has returned and has arranged for six rambunctious Cockney children, evacuated from the London slums, to be billeted with him. Resistant at first, he gradually begins to enjoy his paternal role (he is a widower and his only son was killed in World War 1), despite the children's challenging behaviour.

The eldest boy (Harry) subsequently steals Church's medals and runs away. The General uses logic to work out where he is and takes him back and begins buying books to help the boy train as a mechanic and lets him work on the engine of his Daimler with Bates. One of the children (nicknamed ‘Limpy’ who is frightened at the sound of airplanes) is lame from an injury during a bombing raid and is examined by the local doctor after a fall. The doctor tells the General that the boy’s injury can be cured by surgery, but the boy is terrified. The General reveals his own leg injury, sustained during his wartime service, to Limpy who eventually agrees to the operation. The General pays his own private surgeon to do this. The eldest girl, Carrie – who uses the name of "Snarrer" attempts to appear older than her years by smoking and wearing heavy makeup. She is eventually discouraged from this by Hank, an American soldier friend, with whom she falls in love. Hank is an honourable young man who promises to write and gives "Snarrer" a chaste kiss as he leaves for war, promising more when she is a little older.

One day a bomber crashes next to the mansion and the General becomes a local hero for rescuing the crew from the burning plane. He ends up in hospital with burnt hands. Limpy, having had his operation, is in the hospital bed next to him but the boy is too fearful to walk on his newly repaired leg. The General tricks Limpy into walking by feigning discomfort and presents Limpy with one of his own medals for his bravery. McNab (the Scottish gardener) and Bates visit the General in hospital and tell him that he has been awarded the George Medal for his bravery as a civilian.

== Cast ==
- Godfrey Tearle as Gen. Victor Church
- Jeanne de Casalis as Alice, Lady Frome (Victor's friend and local Women's Voluntary Services official)
- Morland Graham as Bates (his batman)
- Mabel Constanduros as Mrs. Bates (the housekeeper)
- John Laurie as McNab, the gardener
- Patric Curwen as Dr. Sargeant
- Thorley Walters as Maj. Andrew Church (Victor's nephew and ADC to Lord Ottershaw)
- Alec Faversham as Hank the soldier
- Michael Lambart as Maj-Gen. Lord Ottershaw (official at the War Office)
- Irene Handl as Mrs. Famsworth
- Rosalyn Boulter as Billetting Officer
- Maureen Glynne as Carrie Higgins, "Snarrer de la Fontaine" (eldest girl evacuee)
- Gerald Moore as Harry Doakes (eldest boy evacuee)
- Pat Geary as Violet Higgins (evacuee)
- Petula Clark as Irma Smith (evacuee)
- Brian Weske as Tommy Watkins, "Limpy" (evacuee)
- David Trickett as Bobby Higgins (evacuee)

== Production ==
Director Maurice Elvey was still searching for a young girl to portray the precocious orphan Irma when he attended a charity concert to benefit the National Fire Service at Royal Albert Hall. On the bill was 11-year-old Petula Clark, who in addition to singing appeared in a comedy sketch written by her father. Elvey was so impressed by her performance he went backstage and offered her the role in his film.

== Critical reception ==
The Monthly Film Bulletin wrote: "Merits of conscientious production, and some sincere acting are largely baulked by a tempo which is always deliberate and sometimes painfully slow. Both script and direction seem to lack selectivity and conciseness. Jeanne de Casalis, as an old friend of the general, and Morland Graham, as his butler, give strong support to Tearle. There are also some bright flashes from the children."

The Daily Film Renter wrote: "Ponderous handling but with some suspenseful moments and plenty of lively interludes from the kids. Spacious staging, good support and wholesome though conventional scripting. Reliable attraction for the family hall. As a piece of team work, this reflects credit on its makers. Nothing stands out in particular but the popular ingredients are present and it leaves an agreeable taste. It might have been quicker and funnier. As it stands, it is slow and steady, and, the gaucheries of some evacuee children apart, it scores more readily on its human and dramatic points than on its comedy."

Kine Weekly wrote: "Friendly, if slightly naive comedy drama of England in war time. ... The first half is definitely slow and stagey, but the artificial tale livens up considerably when the youngsters appear on the scene, and finally succeeds in making the popular grade. Strangely enough, the practically unknown juvenile players give many points to veterans Godfrey Tearle, Jeanne de Casalis and Morland Graham."

Variety wrote: "English reverence of everything ancient has always operated to the hopeless disadvantage of youth on the stage and in pictures. Medal for the General gives six London kids a chance to show what they can do. They turn in individual performances as good as the best the "Dead End" kids ever did, These youngsters may make this film appeal io U. S. market, in almost any house. British National doesn't star these kids in their early teens: not even featuring them. Godfrey Tearle and Jeanne de' Casalis get top" billing."

Picturegoer wrote: "Pleasant, well acted, if slight, comedy with an English countryside background. ... Morland Graham gives a sound characterisation as the General's batman and Mabel Constanduros is good as his wife. Jeannie De Casalis acts well but does not seem wholly at home as a Frenchwoman, one of the General's old flames. ... The evacuee children are all extremely good and amusing."

The Times said, "Medal for the General is hardly a subtle or intellectual film, but it is warmhearted and the acting and direction show tact and good sense throughout."

The Daily Telegraph thought the story "is hardly promising material, and the sentimental way in which it is treated does nothing to make it more palatable."
