= Kenneth Buckley =

British actor (1906–1982)

Kenneth Milne-Buckley (1 May 1906 – 25 February 1982) was a British actor, producer, and writer known for his contributions to film and television during the mid-20th century (IMDb, 2024).

== Early life and career ==
Milne-Buckley was born on 1 May 1906 in Chadderton, Lancashire, England (The Movie Database, 2024). He began his acting career in the 1930s, securing roles in several films, including The Minstrel Boy (1937) as Austin Ravensbourne, The Second Mr. Bush (1940) as David, and The Master of Bankdam (1947) as Brough (The Movie Database, 2024).

== Transition to production and direction ==
In the 1950s, Milne-Buckley expanded his career into production and direction. He worked on the television series It Pays to Be Ignorant (1957), where he served as both director and producer (Comedy.co.uk, 2024). Additionally, he produced and wrote for The Betty Driver Show in 1952 (IMDb, 2024).

== Personal life ==
Milne-Buckley met television announcer Sylvia Peters on her first day at the BBC, where he was a studio manager. Despite being married with children at the time, he and Peters formed a close professional relationship that later led to marriage (Christopher Silvester, 2024).

== Later years and legacy ==
Kenneth Milne-Buckley died on 25 February 1982 at the age of 75 (FilmAffinity, 2024). His contributions to British film and television—as an actor, producer, director, and writer—reflect his versatility and impact on the entertainment industry (IMDb, 2024).

== Selected filmography ==
- The Minstrel Boy (1937)
- Night Ride (1937) – as Claude Dulson
- Holiday's End (1937)
- The Man in News (1938) – as Ken Marquis
- Stolen Life (1939) – as Garrett
- The Second Mr. Bush (1940)
- School for Secrets (1946) - as Sqdn. Ldr. Buckley
- Master of Bankdam (1947)

=== Television career ===
Milne-Buckley was also involved in television productions, notably as a producer and writer for The Betty Driver Show in 1952 (IMDb, 2024). In addition, he directed and produced the television series It Pays to Be Ignorant in 1957, which was a British adaptation of the American radio quiz show.

=== Personal life ===
On 28 August 1950, Milne-Buckley married Sylvia Peters, a well-known BBC television announcer. The couple had one daughter, Carmella, and Milne-Buckley also became a stepfather to Peters' two children from her previous marriage. A photograph from 1956 shows Milne-Buckley and Peters at home with their child, reflecting their family life during that period.
