= Doreen Montgomery =

British screenwriter (1913–1992)

- Born: 12 April 1913; Glasgow, Scotland
- Died: 24 February 1992 (aged 78); London, England
- Education: University of Edinburgh
- Occupation: Screenwriter

Doreen Catherine Mary Montgomery (12 April 1913 in Glasgow – 24 February 1992 in London) was a British screenwriter.

== Biography ==
Montgomery graduated from the University of Edinburgh with an arts degree. She submitted scripts to Associated British Picture Corporation where they attracted attention of Walter Mycroft who put her under contract.

Working for Gainsborough Pictures, her early credits include Just William (1940), The Man in Grey (1943), Fanny by Gaslight (1944) and While I Live (1947). Television credits include Dr. Finlay's Casebook and The Avengers (for which she created the character of Cathy Gale).

In 1954 she wrote the play A Summer House based on the Constance Kent murder cast. She also co wrote a book, Voices in the Dark (1971).

== Personal life ==
Doreen Catherine Mary Montgomery was born on 12 April 1913 at Balgrayhill Glasgow to James Christie Montgomery M.B., C.M. and Agnes Julie nee Pieke. She was married first to Lawrence Antony Walton on 9 November 1934 at St. Mary's Cathedral, Edinburgh. They divorced in 1941. Her 2nd marriage was in October 1941 in Greenwich to RAF pilot Michael Edmund Staples. He died on 9 November 1941 at Middle Wallop, Hampshire whilst landing his RAF plane. He is buried at Brookwood Cemetery, Surrey. She next married John Nigel Allen Buckmaster in Scotland in 1945. He died in 2010. She died on 24 February 1992 in London.

== Selected filmography ==
- Mr. Reeder in Room 13 (1938)
- Lassie from Lancashire (1938)
- Meet Mr. Penny (1938)
- Dead Men Tell No Tales (1938)
- Poison Pen (1939)
- The Second Mr. Bush (1940)
- The House of the Arrow (1940)
- The Flying Squad (1940)
- At the Villa Rose (1940)
- Just William (1949)
- Bulldog Sees It Through (1940)
- The Man in Grey (1943)
- Fanny by Gaslight (1944)
- Love Story (1944)
- This Man Is Mine (1946)
- While I Live (1947)
- Shadow of the Eagle (1950)
- The Rival of the Empress (1951)
- The Scarlet Web (1954)
- Dance Little Lady (1954)
- Rheingold Theatre (1953–54) (TV series)
- Born for Trouble (1955) (TV series)
- You Can't Escape (1956)
- The Narrowing Circle (1956)
- Hawkeye and the Last of the Mohicans (1957) (TV series)
- William Tell (1958–59) - writer, story editor
- The New Adventures of Charlie Chan (1958) (TV series)
- Murder Reported (1958)
- H.G. Wells' The Invisible Man (1958) (TV series)
- Danger Man (1960) (TV series)
- Sir Francis Drake (1962) (TV series) - writer
- The Avengers (1963) (TV series)
- Crane (1964) (TV series) - writer "A Danger to Others"
- Dr. Finlay's Casebook (1964–65) (TV series) - various episodes
- No Hiding Place (1965) (TV series) - episode "A Fistful of Trouble"
- Who-Dun-It (1969) (TV series) - play basis for "Murder Goes to School"
