= Laugh It Off (1940 film) =

- Directed by: John Baxter
- Written by: Bridget Boland; Austin Melford (dialogue)
- Story by: Bridget Boland
- Produced by: John Corfield
- Starring: Tommy Trinder; Jean Colin
- Cinematography: James Wilson
- Edited by: Michael C. Chorlton
- Music by: Marr Mackie; Ronnie Munro; Kennedy Russell
- Production company: British National Films
- Distributed by: Anglo-American Film Corporation (UK)
- Release date: 9 March 1940 (UK)
- Running time: 78 minutes
- Country: United Kingdom
- Language: English

Laugh It Off is a 1940 British musical comedy film directed by John Baxter and starring Tommy Trinder, Jean Colin, Anthony Hulme and Marjorie Browne. It was written by Bridget Boland and Austin Melford and filmed at Walton Studios starting in November 1939, just after the outbreak of war.

== Plot ==
At the start of World War II, concert party entertainer Tommy Towers is drafted into service. He immediately gets on the wrong side of commanding officer Sergeant Major Slaughter, but after saving the camp show with his show business expertise Tommy is granted a commission.

== Cast ==
- Tommy Trinder as Tommy Towers
- Jean Colin as Sally
- Anthony Hulme as Somers
- Marjorie Browne as Peggy
- Edward Lexy as Sergeant Major Slaughter
- Ida Barr as Mrs McNab
- Charles Victor as Colonel
- Peter Gawthorne as General
- Wally Patch as Sergeant
- Warren Jenkins as Pat
- John Laurie as Jock
- Henry Lytton, Jr. as George

== Production ==
It was the first in a slate of five films made by British National. According to Kinematograph Weekly "Variety will be the keynote of this new ambitious programme with one object in mind—that of making real, honest-to-goodness entertainment."

Filming started November 1939 at Walton Studios. It finished that month. It was trade screened in December.

== Critical reception ==
The Monthly Film Bulletin wrote: " After a very slow beginning this film develops into a simple happy-go-lucky kind of story which will please the unsophisticated and those who like Tommy Trinder. It is frequently punctuated by concert acts designed to set off his characteristic talents. He is well served by his supporting cast, and for many the funniest scene will be the lamentable rehearsal of the Sergeant's troupe, where Tommy Trinder does not appear at all."

Kine Weekly wrote: "Grand comedy, rousing song and variety entertainment at its jolliest."

Picturegoer wrote: "Tommy Trinder certainly scores a personal success in this wartime musical comedy burlesque ... Well-chosen songs intersperse the humour at the expense of officialdom and now and then the patriotic note is struck. Gags are well timed and Trinder gets the most out of each of them. Jean Colin brings prettiness and a pleasing voice to the heroine's role, and sound character work comes from Anthony Hulme, Edward Lexy, Marjorie Brown and Wally Patch. Bright entertainment which banishes the blackout blues."

TV Guide called it "a fairly entertaining effort".

In British Sound Films: The Studio Years 1928–1959 David Quinlan rated the film as "average", writing: "Breezy comedy, ironically funniest when its star is off screen."

The success of the film led to John Cornfeld of British National signing John Baxter to a two-year contract with the company to make five films a year.

The film was reissued in July 1943.
