= Night Ride (1937 film) =

- Opening titles
- Directed by: John Paddy Carstairs
- Written by: Ralph Gilbert Bettison
- Based on: a story by Julian Vedey
- Produced by: Anthony Havelock-Allan
- Starring: Julian Vedey; Wally Patch; Jimmy Hanley
- Cinematography: Desmond Dickinson
- Edited by: Lister Laurance
- Production company: British and Dominions
- Distributed by: Paramount British Pictures
- Release date: June 1937 (UK)
- Running time: 69 minutes
- Country: United Kingdom
- Language: English

Night Ride is a 1937 black and white British drama film directed by John Paddy Carstairs and starring Julian Vedey, Wally Patch and Jimmy Hanley. It was written by Ralph Gilbert Bettison based on a story by Vedey, and was made at Pinewood Studios as a quota quickie for release by Paramount Pictures.

== Plot ==
Young truck driver Dick Benson and his friend Alf Higgins set up their own haulage company with the financial backing of Tony Spinelli, an Italian restaurant owner. However, their former boss Arthur Wilson, concerned about the competition, uses underhand methods to try and sabotage the enterprise. Wilson sends his attractive daughter Ruth to seduce Dick, and a group of thugs to work over their trucks. Wilson very nearly succeeds, but Dick and the truckers make a success of themselves by rescuing miners trapped in a flooded mine.

== Main cast ==
- Julian Vedey as Tony Spinelli
- Wally Patch as Alf Higgins
- Jimmy Hanley as Dick Benson
- Joan Ponsford as Jean Morley
- Frank Petley as Arthur Wilson
- Elizabeth Kent as Ruth Wilson
- Kenneth Buckley as Claude Dulson
- Clelia Matania as Lucia Spinelli
- Mervyn Johns as miner

== Production ==
The film's sets were designed by the art director Wilfred Arnold.

== Critical reception ==
Kine Weekly wrote: "The culminating excursion into spectacle is not too convincing, but the setting out of the plot and the by-play is expert, and all the characters are accurately drawn. On balance, the film comes out on the right side. Good supporting feature for the masses."

Picture Show wrote: "Although it opens well enough, it sags in the middle and never quite recovers its pace. Fair entertainment."

In British Sound Films, David Quinlan considered the film a "saggy drama".

Leslie Halliwell called it a "brisk action programmer".
