= The Adventures of William Tell =

British television series (1958–1959)

- Also known as: William Tell
- Starring: Conrad Phillips; Jennifer Jayne; Richard Rogers; Willoughby Goddard
- Theme music composer: Melody: Gioachino Rossini; Lyrics: Harold Purcell
- Opening theme: William Tell Overture, sung by David Whitfield
- Composers: Albert Elms; Sydney John Kay
- Original language: English
- No. of series: 1
- No. of episodes: 39

Production
- Executive producer: Ralph Smart
- Producer: Leslie Arliss
- Running time: 25 minutes
- Production company: ITC for ATV

Original release
- Network: ITV
- Release: 15 September 1958 – 15 June 1959

The Adventures of William Tell is a British swashbuckler adventure series, first broadcast on the ITV network in 1958, and produced by ITC Entertainment. In the United States, the episodes aired on the syndicated NTA Film Network in 1958–1959.

William Tell is a folk hero of Switzerland in the early 14th century, said to have encouraged the Old Swiss Confederacy population to revolt against the regime of Albert I of Germany (reigned 1298–1308). This legend is recorded in the White Book of Sarnen (1474).

== Cast ==
=== Main ===
- Conrad Phillips as William Tell
- Jennifer Jayne as Hedda Tell (wife)
- Richard Rogers as Walter Tell (son)
- Willoughby Goddard as Landburgher Gessler
- Nigel Green as The Bear
- Jack Lambert as Judge Furst (Hedda's father)
- Peter Hammond as Hofmanstahl

=== Supporting ===
- Derek Bond
- James Booth
- Wilfrid Brambell
- Alfred Burke
- Michael Caine
- John Carson
- Kenneth Cope
- Adrienne Corri
- John Howard Davies
- Roger Delgado
- Frazer Hines
- Sid James
- Edward Judd
- Delphi Lawrence
- Christopher Lee
- Ronald Leigh-Hunt
- John Le Mesurier
- Charles Lloyd-Pack
- William Lucas
- Ferdy Mayne
- Warren Mitchell
- Lee Montague
- Derren Nesbitt
- Glyn Owen
- Donald Pleasence
- Edwin Richfield
- Michael Ripper
- Bruce Seton
- Robert Shaw
- Melissa Stribling
- Frank Thornton
- Patrick Troughton
- Richard Vernon
- Deborah Watling
- Jack Watling
- Mary Webster

== Production ==
The series was produced by Ralph Smart, who wrote a number of stories for the series and also created and produced Danger Man. The show was made at the National Studios in Elstree.

The outdoor scenes were filmed around the mountains and lakes of Snowdonia in Wales. The film base and make-up were at a small farm in Cwm-y-glo in Snowdonia. This is beside Llyn Padarn, a lake which can be seen in many shots. The crew used to walk up the mountain from their base, as there was no vehicle access, and brought work for at least three yearly shoots to a tiny corner of North Wales before tourism took off.

An accident early occurred to the star, Conrad Phillips, during filming in Snowdonia. He was asked to keep stepping back until he stepped off a twelve-foot drop, injuring his knee – which eventually led to his retirement from acting. Phillips had to wear support bandages during filming but sometimes forgot, causing him to struggle with some action scenes.

Daily rushes were viewed at the only cinema in the area, at Llanberis, which was taken over from 8.00 until noon every morning. The film was taken to Soho in London for developing and the rushes returned to Llanberis by 8.30 next morning.

Although all three series had location scenes, the third was more studio-based and location scenes were mostly taken from unused and reused stock shots from the first and second series. A smaller crew went to Wales for this series and more money was saved by shooting without synchronised sound. In the days of enforced demarcation, this saved several technicians' wages.

Though in some ways similar to The Adventures of Robin Hood, a brave bowman fighting against a tyrant, William Tell was an even harder show, with crossbow bolts killing people and Tell fighting hand-to-hand, which often resulted in the death of the bad guy. Unlike the courtly Sheriff of Nottingham, Gessler was a pig of a man, unshaven, often eating or drinking without manners and throwing his metaphorical as well as literal weight around. Nevertheless, the interaction between the hero and the Sheriff and Landburgher respectively, was a strong point in both series, bringing out the high quality diction and crispness of both Alan Wheatley's and Willoughby Goddard's acting. In contrast, the absence of a regular enemy in the TV series Sir Francis Drake weakened that series.

The Adventures of William Tell series was repeated well into the 1960s. In June 2020, the series began a rerun on the British Talking Pictures TV channel and was repeated again on TPTV in 2025-26.

== Music ==
The series featured a long-remembered theme song, with music based on the William Tell Overture by Gioachino Rossini. For the show, the song lyrics were by Harold Purcell and were sung by David Whitfield.

Because this portion of Rossini's overture was the theme of The Lone Ranger in the United States, a different portion of the overture, with lyrics added, became the theme song there, titled: The Freedom Song – "Marching Behind William Tell" by Geoffrey Parsons. This is on The Network DVD episode Castle of Fear.

Incidental music was by Albert Elms and Sydney John Kay.

=== Lyrics ===
1. Come away, come away with William Tell,
Come away to the land he loved so well;
What a day, what a day when the apple fell,
For Tell and Switzerland

2. Come away with Tell to the mountainside
Look down to the pass where the tyrants ride.
Fit a bolt to your bow and down they go,
For Tell and Switzerland

3. We are simple peasant folk
We will not bear a foreign yoke
Our freedom song will echo on
To fight for what is right.

4. Hurry on, hurry on, there's a dungeon cell;
Hurry on, hurry on, there's a noose as well;
But we'll escape from the jaws of hell
For Tell and Switzerland.

5. We lived our lives, we loved our friends,
We never wanted more.
We had the skill to plough and till,
But not the art of war,
But now the tyrant from the plains
Steals up to take our lands,
Instead of spade we wield the blade
Our life is in our hands.

6. Follow on, follow on, at the leader's heel
With a thrust of a pike and a clash of steel
Follow on with the fight till the tyrants reel
For Tell and Switzerland.

7. Give 'em one for the day they burned the grain,
Give 'em two for the night that Fritz was slain,
Give 'em three, give 'em four and hooray for more,
For Tell and Switzerland.

8. The shepherd's crook, the reaping hook
Has taken on a warlike look.
With blades we've beaten from the plough
We'll reap a harvest now.

9. Come away, come away with William Tell,
Come away to the land he loved so well
Fit a bolt to your bow, and away we go
For Te-e-e-ell, and Switzerland.

Verses 1, 2, 4 with the opening titles, 6, 7, 8, 9 with the closing credits.

== Episodes ==
Airdate is for ATV Midlands. ITV regions varied date and order.

No.	Title	Directed by	Written by	Original release date
1	"The Emperor's Hat"	Ralph Smart	Rene Wilde and Leslie Arliss	15 September 1958
The Swiss are subject to heavy taxes and cruel laws by the conquering Austrians and have to show respect to the Emperor's hat placed in each village. William Tell refuses and is arrested and, hearing of his prowess with the crossbow, Landburgher Gessler forces Tell to shoot at an apple on his son's head. Adapted from the original play by Friedrich von Schiller. Stars Derren Nesbitt and Norman Mitchell.
2	"The Hostages"	Ralph Smart	Doreen Montgomery story by Ralph Smart	22 September 1958
Gessler orders William Tell's arrest, after he steals a cache of arms, and takes hostage six innocent men who will be executed if Tell does not surrender. Stars James Booth and Roy Purcell.
3	"Secret Death"	Peter Maxwell	Doreen Montgomery story by Ralph Smart	29 September 1958
When his wife Hedda is captured by Gessler, Tell offers himself in exchange. Stars Sid James, Howard Lang and Peter Welch.
4	"The Gauntlet of St. Gerhardt"	Peter Maxwell	Doreen Montgomery story by Ralph Smart	6 October 1958
The Gauntlet of St. Gerhardt is a religious relic that the Swiss rally round and carry into battle. Gessler plans to steal the relic by killing the abbot that guards it. Stars Derren Nesbitt, Edward Judd and Ian Wallace.
5	"The Prisoner"	Peter Maxwell	John Kruse	13 October 1958
The Austrians building a road into the heart of Switzerland with slave labour capture a resistance fighter. Tell has to free the prisoner. Stars Michael Caine, Bruce Seton, Keith Pyott, Gwen Watford and Richard Shaw.
6	"Voice in the Night"	Terry Bishop	Ralph Smart	20 October 1958
Gessler falsely imprisons two men, Jules Gunther and Judge Furst, who is William Tell's father-in- law. Tell has to expose his replacement Judge and free the men. Stars Ronald Leigh-Hunt, Michael Ripper and Derren Nesbitt.
7	"The Assassins"	Terry Bishop	Ralph Smart story by Rene Wilde	27 October 1958
Prince Karl, the cousin of the Austrian emperor, is assassinated and Gessler arrests two men but gives them the chance to save themselves if they find William Tell and kill him. Stars Alfred Burke, Edwin Richfield and Roy Purcell.
8	"The Baroness"	Peter Maxwell	John Kruse story by Ralph Smart	3 November 1958
A beautiful woman seeks William Tell's help as she is being blackmailed by her bailiff for helping a resistance fighter. Hedda Tell suspects a plot and follows her husband. Stars Delphi Lawrence and Bruce Seton.
9	"The Elixir"	Terry Bishop	Lindsay Galloway story by Ralph Smart	10 November 1958
A local monastery, which is making money from the wine they make, with the proceeds going to founding a school, comes to the attention of Gessler and he wants the recipe in lieu of taxes. Stars Jack Watling and Ian Wallace.
10	"The Suspect"	Quentin Lawrence	Doreen Montgomery and Larry Forester	17 November 1958
A young girl is accused of spying for the Austrians and Tell has to prove her innocence before the townspeople hang her. Stars Edward Judd, Tommy Duggan and Sheila Raynor.
11	"The Cuckoo"	Peter Maxwell	Ralph Smart	24 November 1958
Gessler is under pressure from the Emperor to collect more taxes but his sleep is disturbed by a persistent cuckoo outside his bedroom. Stars Jack Watling
12	"The Bear"	Ernest Morris	Doreen Montgomery story by Michael Connor	1 December 1958
The son of a robber, known as The Bear, because of his size, joins the resistance, against his father's wishes. The Bear challengers Tell to a fight and, if Tell wins, his son can stay with the resistance. Stars Nigel Green and John Howard Davies.
13	"The Magic Powder"	Peter Maxwell	Martin Worth story by Ralph Smart	8 December 1958
Tell and Gessler meet unexpectedly at the castle of Dr. Kleine, a scientist experimenting with explosives. Gessler wants the magic powder for warfare. Stars Gerald Cross.
14	"The Golden Wheel"	Peter Maxwell	Michael Connor	15 December 1958
Gessler discovers the location of resistance funds being channelled to Italy by a Swiss banker, Hanzler, to buy arms. William Tell has to save the banker. Stars Patrick Troughton and Derek Godfrey.
15	"The Bride"	Quentin Lawrence	Doreen Montgomery story by John Kruse	22 December 1958
Maddelena, a beautiful countess, is kidnapped by Austrian soldiers on the orders of Gessler so that he can marry her. Tell sees an opportunity; his wife Hedda is not so sure. Stars Glyn Owen and Nadja Regin.
16	"The Boy Slaves"	Terry Bishop	John Kruse	29 December 1958
Outraged when a boy knocks his hat off, Gessler cancels an agreement to release young slave labourers. When the boy gives himself up, Gessler decides to hang him. Stars Frazer Hines and Derren Nesbitt.
17	"The Young Widow"	Peter Maxwell	Paul Christie	5 January 1959
Escaping the Austrians, William Tell and his wife Hedda, who has been injured, seek refuge with the Countess von Markhein. The Countess's servant recognises the pair and threatens to inform unless the Countess agrees to marry him. Stars Melissa Stribling.
18	"Landslide"	Terry Bishop	John Kruse	12 January 1959
Gessler uses a double of Tell to discredit him, as the double robs the Swiss and Gessler's men collect the taxes again. Stars Charles Lloyd-Pack, Wilfrid Brambell and Frank Thornton.
19	"The Trap"	Quentin Lawrence	Doreen Montgomery story by Max Savage	19 January 1959
The Bear is rescued by Peter von Brechet, who claims to be a fugitive, but Gessler a plan to smash the resistance. Stars Robert Shaw and Walter Gotell.
20	"The Shrew"	Peter Maxwell	Max Savage	26 January 1959
Hedda Tell is lured to a village when told her sister is ill and becomes a pawn in Gessler's plan to capture her husband. Stars Keith Pyott.
21	"The Manhunt"	Peter Maxwell	Doreen Montgomery story by Ralph Smart	2 February 1959
William Tell is trapped on an island and hunted by Prince Erik who enjoys hunting human prey. Stars Christopher Lee and Kevin Stoney.
22	"The Killer"	Peter Maxwell	Lindsay Galloway	9 February 1959
Accused of murder and theft of a partisan, William Tell has to prove his innocence in the face of his main accuser whom he believes is the real killer. Stars Richard Vernon, Derek Godfrey and Kevin Stoney.
23	"The Surgeon"	Peter Maxwell	Doreen Montgomery	16 February 1959
Seriously wounded William Tell is taken to a Swiss surgeon, pursued by Gessler. The surgeon has to think of a way to hide Tell. Stars Frank Thornton.
24	"The Ensign"	Quentin Lawrence	Max Savage and Leslie Arliss	23 February 1959
Fritz, a young Austrian officer, faces a conflict between duty and conscience and turns unexpectedly to William Tell for help. Stars John Carson, Edward Evans and John Maxim.
25	"The Unwelcome Stranger"	Peter Maxwell	Paul Christie	9 March 1959
Tell travels to the sword-making village of Linzen to find out why they have stopped the supply and finds himself under suspicion and the villagers wanting him gone. Stars David de Keyser, Derren Nesbitt and John Maxim.
26	"The Avenger"	Anthony Squire	Lindsay Galloway	16 March 1959
Two envoys sent to negotiate a peace treaty have disappeared and William Tell suspects the beautiful Anna might be involved. Stars John Le Mesurier, Derek Waring and Ralph Michael.
27	"The Bandit"	Anthony Squire	Doreen Montgomery story by Ralph Smart	23 March 1959
Tell searches for one of his men, sent to make contact with a rival resistance leader, and who may have been murdered, but a bandit is operating in the area under Gessler's orders. Stars Kenneth Cope, Brian Rawlinson, Maurice Kaufmann and Robert Raglan.
28	"Gessler's Daughter"	Ernest Morris	Lindsay Galloway	30 March 1959
Gessler seeks William Tell's help when his daughter is kidnapped and held for ransom. Stars Patsy Smart.
29	"The General's Daughter"	Peter Maxwell	Ian Stuart Black	6 April 1959
The Bear is captured when a young Swiss patriot, Stephan, is handing food to the partisans. Tell must rescue him and determine whether or not Stephan is a traitor. Stars Michael Caine and Bruce Seton.
30	"The Raid"	Leslie Arliss	Leslie Arliss and Rene Wilde	13 April 1959
A daring raid on a Swiss-occupied fortress for much needed arms leads to disaster when William Tell is recognised.
31	"Castle of Fear"	Peter Maxwell	Roger Marshall story by Max Savage	20 April 1959
Visiting Werner castle to track down a murderer of a resistance leader, the gateman gives Tell a dire warning of death, with his own life at stake. Stars Ferdy Mayne, Edwin Richfield, Alan Rowe and Erik Chitty.
32	"The Black Brothers"	Quentin Lawrence	Arnold Abbot	27 April 1959
The three Black brothers, Italian bandits, steal arms intended for the Swiss resistance and then try to sell them to William Tell. Stars Roger Delgado, Warren Mitchell, Paul Stassino and Eileen Way
33	"The Lost Letter"	Terry Bishop	Michael Connor	4 May 1959
Without realising it, Gessler is walking about with a letter for which he is searching, in the sole of his boot. William Tell must retrieve it to save the lives of resistance workers. Stars Derren Nesbitt and John Dearth.
34	"Secret Weapon"	Ernest Morris	Doreen Montgomery story by Arnold Abbot	11 May 1959
Gessler is erecting new fortifications that will split the country in two. Tell and The Bear investigate. Stars Jack Watling and Derrick Sherwin.
35	"The Master Spy"	Ernest Morris	Doreen Montgomery	18 May 1959
A beautiful spy, Mara, known as The Shadow, is sent by Gessler to lure Tell into a trap. Stars Jack Watling, Adrienne Corri and Glyn Owen.
36	"The Traitor"	Peter Maxwell	Roger Marshall and Leslie Arliss	25 May 1959
William Tell and Hedda receive a visit from a friendly resistance leader who needs help to find a traitor in his camp. They soon find that they are in a trap. Stars William Lucas, Bruce Seton and Derren Nesbitt.
37	"The Spider"	Ernest Morris	Roger Marshall story Ralph Smart	1 June 1959
A ruthless Austrian commander nicknamed The Spider captures two of Tell's men, demanding to know, under threat of torture, the whereabouts of Tell's camp. Using false documents, Tell infiltrates The Spider's ranks. Stars Donald Pleasence and Deborah Watling.
38	"The Mountain People"	Quentin Lawrence	Doreen Montgomery story by John Kruse	8 June 1959
A beautiful naive girl is rescued by William Tell from Austrian soldiers and finds his life and reputation endangered. Stars Lee Montague, James Booth and John Dearth.
39	"Undercover"	Ernest Morris	Lindsay Galloway	15 June 1959
Tell goes deep into Austrian territory after the death of a partisan whose sources of information go as far as the emperor's daughter. Stars Derek Bond and Peter Welch.

== Home video ==
The entire series is available on a five-disc region 2 DVD set from Network Distributing Ltd Home Entertainment/Granada Ventures in 2007, as well as a three-disc region 1 DVD set.

== Related series ==
Conrad Phillips later played William Tell's sidekick, Stefan, in the series Crossbow which ran from August 1987 till February 1989. William Tell was played by Will Lyman. The series ran for 72 thirty-minute colour episodes over three seasons, 24 each, with the third season unaired in America. Other members of the cast were Jeremy Clyde as Hermann Gessler, Valentine Pelka as Roland, Melinda Mullins as Blade and David Barry Gray as Tell's son Matthew.

There was a series derived from William Tell in New Zealand entitled The Legend of William Tell, which lasted one season of 16 episodes of sixty minutes from August till December 1998. In the cast were Kieren Hutchison as William Tell, Andrew Binns as Xax, Nathaniel Lees as Leon, Katrina Browne as Aruna, Ray Henwood as Kreel, Sharon Tyrell as Kalem, Beth Allen as Princess Varga and Drew Neemia as Drogo.
