= He Found a Star =

1941 film

- Directed by: John Paddy Carstairs
- Written by: Bridget Boland (Screenplay); Austin Melford (Additional Dialogue)
- Based on: Ring O' Roses (novel) by Monica Ewer
- Produced by: John Corfield
- Starring: Vic Oliver; Sarah Churchill
- Cinematography: Ernest Palmer
- Edited by: Michael C. Chorlton
- Music by: Ben Frankel
- Production company: John Corfield Productions
- Distributed by: General Film Distributors (U.K.)
- Release date: 20 September 1941 (U.K.)
- Running time: 89 minutes
- Country: United Kingdom
- Language: English

He Found a Star is a 1941 British musical film directed by John Paddy Carstairs and starring Vic Oliver, Sarah Churchill and Evelyn Dall. It was written by Bridget Boland and Austin Melford based on based on the 1939 novel Ring O' Roses by Monica Ewer. It concerns a frustrated stage manager who quits his job and, with his secretary's help, sets up a theatrical agency. Songs include "Waitin'" (Manning Sherwin & Harold Purcell) and "Salome" (Sarah Churchill).

== Plot ==
Theatrical agent Lucky Lyndon and his loyal secretary Ruth Cavour use their talent agency to discover unknown talents. In his search for the next "big star," Lyndon tries to promote ungrateful nightclub singer Suzanne. Meanwhile, Ruth, who is madly in love with Lyndon, saves the day when the increasingly difficult Suzanne causes a crisis.

== Cast ==
- Vic Oliver as Lucky Lyndon
- Sarah Churchill as Ruth 'Ruthie' Cavour
- Evelyn Dall as Suzanne
- Gabrielle Brune as Diane
- J.H. Roberts as Mr. Victor Cavour
- Barbara Everest as Mrs. Cavour
- Joan Greenwood as Babe Cavour
- David Evans as Jimmy Cavour
- Robert Sansom as Dick Hargreaves
- Jonathan Field as Bob Oliphant
- Mignon O'Doherty as Mrs. Miley
- Peggy Novak as Madame
- Robert Atkins as Frank Forrester
- George Merritt as Max Nagel
- Raymond Lovell as Nick Maurier
- Uriel Porter as George Washington 'Wash' Brown
- Peggy McCormack as Rose, Lucky's date
- Charles Victor as Ben Marsh
- Cyril Chamberlain as Louie
- Jack Kellaway as Jack
- Sylvia Kellaway as Elsie
- Eileen Bennett as Sleepy
- Peter Saunders as Raymond Alvarez

== Production ==
The film was made by John Corfield Productions with sets designed by Alfred Junge.

== Critical reception ==
The Monthly Film Bulletin wrote: "A pleasing story, well told without unnecessary sentimentality, and with a good balance of light comedy. Vic Oliver is a very satisfactory Lucky Lyndon, and is well partnered by Sarah Churchill as Ruth Cavour. There are two cameos worth noting particularly by J. H. Roberts as Mr. Cavour and George Merritt as the producer Max Nagel."

Kine Weekly wrote: "The first half is ragged and a number of story loose ends do not improve matters, but an adroit culminating mixture of popular humour and sentiment, good tunes and better acts, nevertheless, enable the show to make the grade. ... The direction is somewhat erratic and many early issues are shelved ... but although the story promises more than it gives it is sufficiently well supported by the stars and clever vaudeville entertainers happily to last out its ample running time. Evelyn Dall and Uriel Porter, a fine coloured singer, are particularly good. Star values confirm its obvious mass appeal."
