= Gerhard Kempinski =

German actor (1904–1947)

Gerhard Kempinski (1904–1947) was a German-born actor.

== Partial filmography ==
- The Day Will Dawn (1942)
- We'll Smile Again (1942)
- Lady from Lisbon (1942)
- Thursday's Child (1943)
- Beware of Pity (1946)
- Spring Song (1946)
- Gaiety George (1946)
- Woman to Woman (1947)
- White Cradle Inn (1947)
