= Joss Ambler =

Australian-born British film and television actor (1900–1959)

- 1939 photo by Angus McBean
- Born: 23 June 1900; Melbourne, Victoria, Australia
- Died: 1959 (aged 58–59); Kensington, London, England
- Years active: 1937–58
- Spouse: Irene Floyd

Joss Ambler (23 June 1900 – 1959) was an Australian-born British film and television actor. He usually played somewhat pompous and irascible figures of authority, particularly in comedy films. He was an effective foil to George Formby in both Trouble Brewing (as Lord Redhill) and Come On George! (as Sir Charles), and similarly to Will Hay in The Black Sheep of Whitehall, (as a government minister).

== Filmography ==
Year	Title	Role	Notes
1937	The Last Curtain	Ellis	
1937	Captain's Orders	Randolph Potts	
1938	The Claydon Treasure Mystery	Inspector Fleming	
1938	Break the News	Press Agent	
1938	Meet Mr. Penny	Gridley	
1938	The Citadel	Dr. A.H. Llewellyn	
1938	Premiere	Spectator	
1938	Keep Smiling	Max	Uncredited
1939	Murder in Soho	Drunk	
1939	Trouble Brewing	Lord Redhill	
1939	Black Eyes	Tipsy Diner	Uncredited
1939	Secret Journey	Col. Blondin	
1939	Come On George!	Sir Charles Bailey	
1940	Contraband	Lt. Cmdr. Ashton	
1940	The Briggs Family	Prosecutor	
1941	The Prime Minister	Earl of Carnarvon	Uncredited
1941	Fingers	Inspector	
1941	Once a Crook	Inspector Marsh	
1941	Atlantic Ferry	Dr Lardner	
1941	Jeannie	Proprietor	
1942	The Black Sheep of Whitehall	Sir John	
1942	The Big Blockade	Stoltenhoff	
1942	Penn of Pennsylvania	Lord Mayor	
1942	The Next of Kin	Mr Vernon	
1942	Flying Fortress	Sheepshead	Uncredited
1942	Let the People Sing	Minor Role	Uncredited
1942	Gert and Daisy Clean Up	Mr. Perry	
1942	Much Too Shy	Sir George Driscoll	
1943	The Peterville Diamond	Police Chief	
1943	The Silver Fleet	Cornelis Smit	
1943	Happidrome	Mr Mossup	
1943	Rhythm Serenade	Mr. Preston	
1943	Somewhere in Civvies	Matthews	
1943	Headline	Chief Sub-Editor	
1943	Battle for Music	Mr. Clifton	
1944	The Halfway House	Pinsent	
1944	A Canterbury Tale	Police Inspector	
1944	Candles at Nine	Garth Hope	
1945	Give Me the Stars	George Burns	
1945	They Were Sisters	Blakemore	
1945	I'll Be Your Sweetheart	Dugan	
1945	The Agitator	Charles Sheridan	
1946	The Years Between	Atherton	
1946	Under New Management	Hotel Manager	
1946	Here Comes the Sun	Bradshaw	
1947	Mine Own Executioner	Julian Briant	
1950	Her Favourite Husband	Mr Wilson	
1950	The Magnet	Businessman	
1952	Who Goes There!	Tour Guide	Uncredited
1952	Something Money Can't Buy	Mr Burton	
1952	Ghost Ship	Yard Manager	
1952	Murder at Scotland Yard	Lester	
1953	Martin Luther		
1953	The Captain's Paradise	Prof. Ebbart	
1953	Background	Judge	
1954	John Wesley	Trustee of Georgia	
1954	Aunt Clara	Paul Levington	Uncredited
1954	The Harassed Hero	Dr Grice	
1955	Miss Tulip Stays the Night	Inspector Thorne	
1955	Strange Experiences	Effdob Bilk	Episode: "The Pickpocket"
1956	The Feminine Touch	Mr Bateman	
1956	Soho Incident	Tom Walker	
1956	The Long Arm	Cashier	
1956	The Big Money	Hobson	Uncredited
1958	Dunkirk	Small Boat Owner	Uncredited
