= Debt of Honour =

1936 British film by Norman Walker

- Directed by: Norman Walker
- Written by: Cyril Campion; Thomas J. Geraghty
- Based on: story by Herman C. McNeile
- Produced by: John Corfield
- Starring: Leslie Banks; Will Fyffe; Geraldine Fitzgerald
- Cinematography: Robert Martin
- Production company: British National Films
- Distributed by: General Film Distributors
- Release date: 27 March 1936
- Running time: 83 minutes 54 mins (1939 reissue)
- Country: United Kingdom
- Language: English

Debt of Honour (also known as The Man Who Could Not Forget) is a 1936 British drama film directed by Norman Walker and starring Leslie Banks, Will Fyffe, Geraldine Fitzgerald and Garry Marsh. It was based on a story by Sapper, and scripted by Tom Geraghty and Cyril Campion.

It was made at British and Dominions Elstree Studios by British National Films. It was the second film made by British National, and had the same director, Norman Walker, as the first, Turn of the Tide (1935).

== Plot ==
A Colonel's daughter steals from the regimental mess funds to pay off her gambling debts. One of the officers, who is love with her, takes the blame, and is sent to Africa.

== Cast ==
- Leslie Banks as Major Jimmie Stanton
- Will Fyffe as Fergus McAndrews
- Geraldine Fitzgerald as Peggy Mayhew
- Niall MacGinnis as Lieutenant Peter Stretton
- Reginald Purdell as Pedro Salvas
- Garry Marsh as Bill
- Stewart Rome as Major Purvis
- Phyllis Dare as Mrs Stretton
- Joyce Kennedy as Lady Bracebury
- William Kendall as Paul Martin
- Randle Ayrton as Captain Turner
- Eric Cowley as Richard Denham
- David Horne as Colonel Mayhew
- Kathleen Davis as Kamara

== Production ==
It was the second film from British National Films. It was originally called "Word of Honour".

Some scenes were shot at Pembroke Docks, Tilbury with the co operation of the War Office.

== Release ==
The film was originally released in 1936. Picturegoer criticised the "unsophisticated and extremely naive story built on a too hearty "stout fellar" tradition... There are several unintentional laughs owing to the out-moded nature of plot and treatment, but Will Fyffe does manage to provide some genuine light relief at times as an African trader."

It was reissued in 1939 at a shorter running time. Kinematograph Weekly wrote "the initial criticism still goes. It was described as 'too deeply saturated in the hoary stout-fellow tradition of the pre-war stages ever to get by with modern, sophisticated audiences.' Star values and quota ticket may serve it in good stead."

== Bibliography ==
- Low, Rachael. Filmmaking in 1930s Britain. George Allen & Unwin, 1985.
- Wood, Linda. British Films, 1927-1939. British Film Institute, 1986.
