= Rosalyn Boulter =

British actress (1917–1997)

- 1939 Spotlight photo (by Angus McBean)
- Born: 1 February 1917; Burton upon Trent, East Staffordshire, England
- Died: 6 March 1997 (aged 80); Santa Barbara, California, U.S.
- Occupation: Actress
- Spouse(s): Stanley Haynes; William Sistrom
- Children: Carol Haynes Johnson

Rosalyn Boulter (1 February 1917 – 6 March 1997) was an English stage and screen actress. She married Stanley Haynes, a film writer, director and producer, before having a daughter together, Carol, in 1943.

Between 1935 and 1936 Boulter featured in four West End productions shortly followed by her first two films, a romantic comedy called Love at Sea (1936) and a thriller called Holiday's End (1937). In 1937, she toured the UK and made her Broadway debut, playing the lead in the West End hit George and Margaret. Boulter died on 6 March 1997 in Santa Barbara, California, United States.

== Filmography ==
Year	Title	Role	Notes
1936	Love at Sea	Betty	
1937	Return of a Stranger	Carol Wall	
1937	Holiday's End	Joyce Deane	
1938	A Royal Divorce	Hortense	
1942	The First of the Few	Mabel Lovesay	
1943	The Gentle Sex	Telephonist	
1943	Rhythm Serenade	Monica Jimson	
1944	Medal for the General	Billetting Officer	
1946	George in Civvy Street	Mary Colton	
1946	This Man Is Mine	Brenda Ferguson	
1949	For Them That Trespass	Frankie Ketchen	
1957	All Mine to Give	Mrs. Stephens	(final film role)
