= What Would You Do, Chums? =

- Syd Walker and Jean Gillie in the film
- Directed by: John Baxter
- Written by: Gordon Crier (radio series); David Evans; Geoffrey Orme; Con West
- Produced by: John Corfield
- Starring: Syd Walker; Jean Gillie; Cyril Chamberlain
- Cinematography: James Wilson
- Edited by: Reginald Mills
- Music by: Kennedy Russell
- Production company: British National Films
- Distributed by: Anglo-American Film Corporation
- Release date: 11 December 1939
- Running time: 75 minutes
- Country: United Kingdom
- Language: English

What Would You Do, Chums? is a 1939 British comedy film directed by John Baxter and starring Syd Walker, Jean Gillie, Cyril Chamberlain and Peter Gawthorne. It was written by Gordon Crier, David Evans, Geoffrey Orme and Con West based on a sketch Walker hosted in the BBC radio series Band Waggon, and the film's title was taken from the popular catchphrase of Walker in the series. It was made at Elstree Studios.

== Plot ==
Soon after junk man Syd Walker takes Lucy under his wing, she falls in love with fellow-lodger Mike Collins. When Syd finds out that Mike is connected to a forgery operation, he forces him to confess all to Lucy, and when he promises to go straight, Lucy forgives him. Nevertheless Mike continues his criminal activities and is arrested. Syd persuades a lawyer to defend him, but arranges via a legal technicality for his defence to fail, in order to save Lucy from an unhappy marriage to a career criminal.

== Cast ==
- Syd Walker as himself/narrator
- Jean Gillie as Lucy
- Cyril Chamberlain as Mike Collins
- Jack Barty as Joe Barker
- Wally Patch as Tom
- Gus McNaughton as Harry Piper
- Peter Gawthorne as Sir Douglas Gordon KC
- Julian Vedey as Mossy
- Arthur Finn as Slim Barton
- Andreas Malandrinos as Pop
- Leonard Morris as Ernie Parsons
- George Street as Inspector Wedge

== Production ==
The project was originally called Mr Walker Wants to Know. Producer John Corfleld successfully defended an action by radio writer Ernest Dudley to stop him from using both that title and the title What Would You Do, Chums?, which Dudley claimed was based on a script he had sold to Jack Buchanan which was subsequently sold to British National.

== Reception ==
The Monthly Film Bulletin wrote: "Comedy drama. One glance at the title of this film will tell any radio listener that it is all about Mr. Walker, and one of his famous 'Mr. Walker-wants-to-know' problems. The translation of this idea from the medium of the radio to that of the screen has been carried out with considerable success ... The humour is rich, and full, and the acting of every part is convincing, but the devastating anti-climax at the finish, in order to drag in a happy ending, nearly succeeds in wrecking the entire film."

Kine Weekly wrote: "Cockney comedy drama, representing an intriguing human problem from the notebook of Syd Walker, of B.B.C. fame. The principal character asks the question and, in all good time, provides the answer. In performing his task he paves the way to rich, down-to-earth entertainment of universal appeal. Supporting Syd Walker, who, let it be observed, gets his quaint and compelling radio personality well and truly over, are excellent types, dialogue and atmosphere."

The Daily Film Renter wrote: "Syd Walker vehicle, with star appearing as famous B.B.C. junk-man in story that presents characteristic 'problem' ... Low life cameos are convincingly portrayed in realistic settings, and Cockney humour neatly balanced by moments of pathos, while star is in own particular element. Very good entertainment for popular consumption, with Syd Walker big drawing card in celebrated radio character study."
