= Waltz Time (1945 film) =

1945 film

- Directed by: Paul L. Stein
- Written by: Henry C. James; Karl Rossier; Montgomery Tully; Jack Whittingham
- Produced by: Louis H. Jackson
- Starring: Carol Raye; Peter Graves; Patricia Medina
- Cinematography: Ernest Palmer
- Edited by: Douglas Myers
- Music by: Hans May
- Production company: British National Films
- Distributed by: Anglo-American Film Corporation
- Release date: 13 August 1945
- Running time: 98 minutes
- Country: United Kingdom
- Language: English

Waltz Time is a 1945 British musical film directed by Paul L. Stein and starring Carol Raye, Peter Graves and Patricia Medina. It was written by Henry C. James, Karl Rossier, Montgomery Tully and Jack Whittingham.

== Premise ==
In Imperial Vienna a young Grand Duchess is prevented from marrying the man she loves.

== Ccast ==
- Carol Raye as Empress Maria
- Peter Graves as Count Franz von Hofer
- Patricia Medina as Cenci Prohaska
- John Ruddock as Count Prohaska
- Harry Welchman as Count Rodzanka
- Thorley Walters as Stefan Ravenne
- George Robey as Vogel
- Wylie Watson as Josef
- Richard Tauber as Shepherd
- Toni Edgar-Bruce as Augustine
- Hay Petrie as Minister of War
- Hugh Dempster as Ferdinand Hohenlohe
- Brefni O'Rorke as Emperor
- Ivan Samson as Gendarmes Captain
- Kay Kendall as lady-in-waiting

== Reception ==
=== Box office ===
According to Kine Weekly the film was a "runner up" at the British box office in 1945.

=== Critical ===
The Monthly Film Bulletin wrote: "This is a light-hearted film in which appear a galaxy of stars. The whole production is on a lavish scale, but with its background of Court scenes and picturesque Vienna it cries out for the use of colour. All the principals are well suited to the parts they play, and the whole thing is garnished with tuneful music, the high-lights of which should be, of course, the songs which Richard Tauber contributes. It must be admitted, however, that the parts in which he appears seem to have been added somewhat as an afterthought. And how it jars to hear the Empress persistently saying 'Lootenant!'"

Variety wrote: "This is a big disappointment. But it goes further than that. This film is proof of British picture makers' ignorance of fundamentals that make a film musical. Production-wise, Waltz Time is terrific. The tunes are okay and mainly adequately sung. Orchestration is top-notch and effectively handled both by visual bands and also background music. But it is no go, mainly because of faulty scripting and direction."
