= Dead Men Tell No Tales (1938 film) =

1938 British film by David MacDonald

- Directed by: David MacDonald
- Written by: Stafford Dickens; Doreen Montgomery; Walter Summers; Emlyn Williams
- Based on: The Norwich Victims by Francis Beeding
- Produced by: John Corfield
- Starring: Emlyn Williams; Sara Seegar; Hugh Williams
- Cinematography: Bryan Langley
- Edited by: James Corbett
- Music by: W.L. Trytel
- Production company: British National Films
- Distributed by: Associated British Film Distributors
- Release date: 1938
- Running time: 70 minutes
- Country: United Kingdom
- Language: English

Dead Men Tell No Tales is a 1938 British thriller film directed by David MacDonald and starring Emlyn Williams, Sara Seegar and Hugh Williams. It was written by Stafford Dickens, Doreen Montgomery, Walter Summers and Emlyn Williams based on the 1935 novel The Norwich Victims by Francis Beeding. The film was made at Welwyn Studios.

== Plot ==
An English schoolteacher wins a French lottery, but on her way to Paris she is murdered and an imposter attempts to claim her prize.

== Cast ==
- Emlyn Williams as Dr. Headlam
- Sara Seegar as Marjorie
- Hugh Williams as Detective Inspector Martin
- Marius Goring as Greening
- Lesley Brook as Elizabeth Orme
- Christine Silver as Miss Haslett
- Clive Morton as Frank Fielding
- Ann Wilton as Bridget
- Jack Vyvian as Crump
- Marjorie Dale as The Singer
- Hal Gordon as Sergeant

== Reception ==
Kinematograph Weekly reported that the film "received the approval of the press" and ran for two weeks at a West End theatre. It also wrote that the film did well at the British box office in May 1938, adding that the film was "one that confounded the critics".

The Monthly Film Bulletin wrote: "Of its kind it is very well done – efficiently put over and brilliantly acted. Emlyn Williams in the dual role of the pedantic and supercilious schoolmaster and the cold-blooded murderer dominates: the whole thing, and gives a remarkable performance, differentiating skilfully the totally contrasted characters. ... Suspense is well maintained, and the sadistic element in the final scene is in keeping with the atmosphere throughout. The supporting players give of their best, and the technical qualities reach a high standard."

The Evening Standard wrote the film had "a hair raising start, but pace slackens."

The movie received strong reviews in the US. Variety wrote: "A blood-and-thunder contribution by England that has its drawbacks but can stand up alongside the average 'B' of its type in America... There is plenty of action in Alliance's murder mystery but also a lot of dialog, some of it a bit windy. ... No one touches Williams on performance, but some others in the cast are agreeable characters, well portrayed. Romantic leads are Sara Seegar, who's fairly good, and Hugh Williams, as a pretty youthful Scotland Yard inspector. ... A mildly impressive job is turned in by Marius Goring. English accents are rather pronounced."

== Bibliography ==
- Goble, Alan. The Complete Index to Literary Sources in Film. Walter de Gruyter, 2011. ISBN 9783110951943
- Shafer, Stephen C. British popular films, 1929-1939: the cinema of reassurance. Routledge, 1997.
