= Lassie from Lancashire =

- British trade ad
- Directed by: John Paddy Carstairs
- Written by: Ernest Dudley; Doreen Montgomery
- Produced by: John Corfield
- Starring: Marjorie Browne; Hal Thompson; Marjorie Sandford
- Cinematography: Bryan Langley
- Production company: British National Films
- Distributed by: Associated British Film Distributors
- Release date: August 1938
- Running time: 81 minutes
- Country: United Kingdom
- Language: English
- Budget: £13,920

Lassie from Lancashire is a 1938 British romantic musical comedy film directed by John Paddy Carstairs and starring Marjorie Browne, Hal Thompson and Marjorie Sandford. It was written by Ernest Dudley and Doreen Montgomery, and made by British National Films at Welwyn Studios. The film's art direction was by Duncan Sutherland.

== Plot ==
Struggling young actress Jenny joins her dad when he moves into Aunt Hetty's boarding house. Aunt Hetty overworks them, but Jenny is lucky enough to find love in the form of aspiring songwriter Tom. But their romance is threatened and nearly destroyed by Margie, the jealous star actress of the local pierrot troupe. However, the young lovers move on to bigger and better things after winning a London West End theatre contract.

== Cast ==
- Marjorie Browne as Jenny
- Hal Thompson as Tom
- Marjorie Sandford as Margie
- Mark Daly as Dad
- Vera Lennox as Daisy
- Elsie Wagstaff as Aunt Hetty
- Billy Caryll as himself
- Hilda Mundy as herself
- Johnnie Schofield as Cyril
- Leslie Phillips as bit part
- Anita Sharp-Bolster as woman in audience

== Critical reception ==
The Monthly Film Bulletin wrote: "The charming little love story is merely the excuse for a number of catchy songs and jokes which are not only funny but clean. Marjorie Browne makes a vivacious Jenny, Hal Thompson is a sufficiently attractive hero and Elsie Wagstaffe puts just the right amount of exaggeration into the part of a shrew of a landlady."

Kine Weekly wrote: "Marjorie Browne shows promise in the lead, while the supporting players with few exceptions shoulder their responsibilities competently and amicably. Atmosphere is very good. ... Cheery story, friendly team-work, good atmosphere tuneful numbers, bright comedy burlesque and catchy title."

The Daily Film Renter wrote: "No subtleties, but a broad story done with a fair amount of hokum, and a warm homely treatment which should please industrial audiences. ... Highlights are turns by Caryll and Mundy; Tessa Deane; and the Three Music Hall Boys."

TV Guide gave the film two out of four stars, calling it "An amusing little romantic comedy."
