= Twilight Hour =

- Danish poster
- Directed by: Paul L. Stein
- Written by: Jack Whittingham
- Based on: Twilight Hour by Arthur Valentine
- Produced by: Louis H. Jackson
- Starring: Mervyn Johns; Basil Radford; Marie Lohr
- Cinematography: James Wilson
- Edited by: Douglas Myers
- Music by: Hans May
- Production company: British National Films
- Distributed by: Anglo-American Film Corporation
- Release date: 12 February 1945
- Running time: 85 minutes
- Country: United Kingdom
- Language: English

Twilight Hour is a 1945 British drama film directed by Paul L. Stein and starring Mervyn Johns, Basil Radford, and Marie Lohr. It was written by Jack Whittingham based on the 1944 novel of the same title by Arthur Valentine.

== Cast ==
- Mervyn Johns as Major John Roberts
- Basil Radford as Lord Chetwood
- Marie Lohr as Lady Chetwood
- A. E. Matthews as General Fitzhenry
- Lesley Brook as Virginia Roberts
- Grey Blake as Michael Chetwood
- Ian McLean as Hemingway
- Barbara Waring as Gladys
- Brefni O'Rorke as Richard Melville
- Margaret Vyner as Angela
- Joyce Heron as Diana
- Marie Ault as Liz
- Cecil Bevan as Hartley
- Marjorie Caldicott as Mrs. Trim
- Noel Dainton as chauffeur
- Gabrielle Daye as housemaid
- Toni Edgar-Bruce as Mrs. Cardigan
- Margaret Emden as Duchess of Wetherby
- Violet Gould as charwoman
- Alfred Harris as Wilkinson
- John Howard as William Rolands
- Ruby Miller as Mother Superior
- Ethel Royale as Mrs. Rolands
- Roy Russell as Sir John Gough
- Christopher Steele as Mr. Cardigan
- Edward Stirling as Magistrate
- Elsa Tee as Jeavons
- Richard Turner as The Abbot
- Rita Varien as Mrs. Murphy
- Bertram Wallis as Duke of Wetherby
- Olive Walter as marchioness
- David Ward as Roger
- C. Denier Warren as photographer
- H. Victor Weske
- Sybil Wise as Miss Perkins
- Victor Wood as footman

== Production ==
The film was shot at the British National Studios in Elstree, with sets designed by art director Wilfred Arnold.

== Reception ==
The Monthly Film Bulletin wrote: "The sterling sincerity of Mervyn Johns' work and determined support from Basil Radford, Marie Lohr and Lesley Brook save this piece. They succeed despite a script which attempts to find interest in any and every irrelevant detail presumably because of a basic failure to keep the main and subsidiary themes in perspective. Direction also suffers from this confusion, so that tempo is periodically slowed to concentrate on nonessentials. Photography is good and contributes much to the atmosphere of the country-house sequences. The burial alive of Mervyn Johns and his escape are factors for those who consider the suitability of films for children."

Picturegoer wrote: "An exceedingly good performance by Mervyn Johns as a gallant officer ... helps to bolster up a somewhat synthetic, romantic comedy-drama."

Leslie Halliwell wrote: "Plodding and very predictable drama with popular cast."
