= Gaslight (1940 film) =

1940 British film by Thorold Dickinson

- Pre-release poster for trade showing
- Directed by: Thorold Dickinson
- Written by: A. R. Rawlinson; Bridget Boland
- Based on: Gas Light; 1938 play by Patrick Hamilton
- Produced by: John Corfield
- Starring: Anton Walbrook; Diana Wynyard
- Cinematography: Bernard Knowles
- Edited by: Sidney Cole
- Music by: Richard Addinsell
- Production company: British National Films
- Distributed by: Anglo-American Film Corp. (United Kingdom)
- Release date: 25 June 1940 (United Kingdom)
- Running time: 89 minutes
- Country: United Kingdom
- Language: English

Gaslight (released in the United States as Angel Street) is a 1940 British psychological thriller directed by Thorold Dickinson starring Anton Walbrook, Diana Wynyard and Frank Pettingell. It was written by A. R. Rawlinson and Bridget Boland.

The film adheres more closely to the original play upon which it is based – Patrick Hamilton's Gas Light (1938) – than does the 1944 MGM remake.

== Plot ==
In Pimlico, London, Alice Barlow is murdered by an unknown man, who then ransacks her house, ripping her furniture apart as if desperately searching for something. The house remains empty for many years, until newlyweds Paul and Bella Mallen move in. Bella soon finds herself misplacing small objects; and, before long, Paul has her believing she is losing her sanity. B. G. Rough, a former detective involved in the original murder investigation, begins to suspect Paul of Alice Barlow's murder.

The gas lamps in the house dim slightly, which disturbs and confuses Bella - such dimming suggests that someone elsewhere in the house has been lighting additional lamps - but when Bella asks the servants, they say that nobody else is in the house. Unknown to everyone is that Paul has entered the upper floor from the roof and has turned on the lamps upstairs while he searches for jewels. The sinister change in light levels, as well as unexplained noises, heighten Bella's insecurity due to the pattern of deception to which Paul subjects Bella, such as berating her for losing a brooch, which he had hidden inside his locked rolltop desk.

Rough gets wind of Paul's plan to have Bella certified insane and institutionalised so that he can carry on with Nancy, their promiscuous maid, and summons Bella's concerned cousin Vincent Ullswater for help in getting her out of Paul's grasp. After Paul verbally abuses Bella before leaving to attend a music hall show with Nancy, Rough comes to the house and reveals to Bella that Paul is really the wanted Louis Bauer, who has returned to the house to search for the rubies he was unable to find after murdering his aunt, Alice Barlow. Furthermore, due to Bauer's bigamous marriage to another woman in Australia, his marriage to Bella is invalid. Rough forces open Paul's desk in search of evidence that Paul is Bauer, but is interrupted when Bella sees the gaslight flicker shortly before Bauer returns to the house. Rough confronts him with their knowledge and Bauer mockingly opens the desk drawer which he is confident contains no evidence. Inside is Bella's missing brooch, and she reveals that the brooch has a secret compartment in which the rubies had been hidden. When the brooch is opened Alice Barlow's initials can be seen inside. Bella also tells Rough that she hid the rubies inside a vase on the mantelpiece. The cornered Bauer attacks them both with a chair, but is knocked unconscious by Rough. Bauer attempts to coerce Bella into freeing him from his restraints, but she denounces him at knifepoint before he is led away by the police.

== Cast ==
- Anton Walbrook as Paul Mallen/Louis Bauer
- Diana Wynyard as Bella Mallen
- Frank Pettingell as B. G. Rough
- Cathleen Cordell as Nancy, the parlour maid
- Robert Newton as Vincent Ullswater
- Jimmy Hanley as Cobb
- Minnie Rayner as Elizabeth, the cook
- Marie Wright as Alice Barlow
- Aubrey Dexter as house agent
- Mary Hinton as Lady Winterbourne
- Angus Morrison as pianist
- Jack Barty as chairman of music hall
- The Darmora Ballet
- Katie Johnson as Alice Barlow's maid (uncredited)

== Production ==
The film was announced in June 1939. It was a more prestigious production from British National Pictures than that studio normally made.

== Reception ==
=== Box office ===
According to Kinematograph Weekly the film did well at the British box office in September 1940.

=== Critical ===
The Monthly Film Bulletin wrote: "This is a gripping story, the suspense of which heightens right up to the last few moments. It is effectively produced, brilliantly directed and admirably acted. The Victorian background is cleverly portrayed, and relief from the Grand Guignol atmosphere is provided by a music-hall sequence, complete with comic song and can-can. There are numerous touches, in addition to the very effective opening, by means of which the Director adds poignancy to the situation. He is well served by the cast. Anton Walbrook gives a brilliant performance of unmitigated and heartless villainy, and Diana Wynyard has never acted better. Hers is an exceedingly difficult part, but she seizes the opportunities it offers with both hands, and gives a well-balanced, sensitive and appealing study of the hapless and helpless victim of a maniac. The supporting players rise to the high standard of acting set by the principals."

Rotten Tomatoes tallied a 100% score, based on six professional reviews.

Leonard Maltin gave the film 3 1/2 stars (out of 4): "Electrifying atmosphere, delicious performances, and a succinctly conveyed sense of madness, and evil lurking beneath the surface of the ordinary".

The Time Out critic wrote, "Nothing like as lavish as the later MGM version ... But in its own small-scale way a superior film by far. Lurking menace hangs in the air like a fog, the atmosphere is electric, and Wynyard suffers exquisitely as she struggles to keep dementia at bay."

== Post-release ==
Encouraged by the success of the play and film, MGM bought the remake rights, but with a clause insisting that all existing prints of Dickinson's version be destroyed, even to the point of trying to destroy the negative, so that it would not compete with their more highly publicised 1944 remake starring Charles Boyer, Ingrid Bergman, and Joseph Cotten.

When the British film (1940) was eventually released in the United States in 1952, it was renamed as Angel Street, the title that had been used in the 1940s for Broadway productions of the original play.

== Denominalisation of the film's title ==
Self-help and popular psychology authors sometimes denominalise the film's title (also known as "verbing") and use it as a verb ("gaslighting"). Gaslighting, in this context, refers to manipulating a person or a group of people, in a way similar to the way the protagonist in the play was manipulated.
