= Penn of Pennsylvania =

1941 film by Lance Comfort

- Italian poster
- Directed by: Lance Comfort
- Written by: Anatole de Grunwald; C. E. Vulliamy (biography)
- Produced by: Richard Vernon
- Starring: Clifford Evans; Deborah Kerr; Dennis Arrundell
- Cinematography: Gus Drisse
- Edited by: Sidney Cole
- Music by: William Alwyn (first film score)
- Production company: British National Films
- Distributed by: Anglo-American Film Corporation (UK); J.H. Hoffberg Company (U.S.)
- Release date: 1941
- Running time: 78 mins
- Country: UK
- Language: English

Penn of Pennsylvania (also known as Courageous Mr. Penn) is a 1941 British historical drama film directed by Lance Comfort and starring Deborah Kerr, Clifford Evans, Dennis Arundell, Henry Oscar, Herbet Lomas and Edward Rigby. It was written by Anatole de Grunwald "with acknowledgements to C. E. Vulliamy's William Penn."

The film depicts the life of the Quaker founder of Pennsylvania, William Penn.

== Story ==
The film portrays Penn's struggle to be granted a colonial charter in London and to attract settlers to his new colony, as well as his adoption of a radical new approach to the treatment of the Native Americans.

== Cast ==
- Clifford Evans as William Penn
- Deborah Kerr as Gulielma Maria Springett
- Dennis Arundell as Charles II
- Aubrey Mallalieu as Chaplain
- D.J. Williams as Lord Arlington
- O. B. Clarence as Lord Cecil
- James Harcourt as George Fox
- Charles Carson as Admiral Penn
- Henry Oscar as Samuel Pepys
- Max Adrian as Elton
- John Stuart as Bindle
- Maire O'Neill as Cook
- Edward Rigby as Bushell
- Mary Hinton as Lady Castlemaine
- Joss Ambler as Lord Mayor
- Edmund Willard as Captain
- Percy Marmont as Holme
- Gibb McLaughlin as Indian Chief
- Herbert Lomas as Captain Cockle
- Gus McNaughton as mate

== Production ==
The idea of a film about Penn was developed by the producer Richard Vernon. After listening to a radio broadcast by President Franklin Delano Roosevelt, Vernon had been struck by how similar his views were to the Quaker philosophy of William Penn. The next morning, he approached bosses at British National Films and pitched the idea of a Penn biopic to them, securing their support. Anatole de Grunwald hastily wrote a screenplay and production of the film began at Elstree Studios on 10 February 1941. Filming finished April 1941.

Deborah Kerr, a rising star although not yet 20 years old, was given equal billing with Clifford Evans, who played Penn, but she had far less screen time as the film primarily focused on Penn rather than her portrayal of his wife. The film concentrates on Penn's emblematic importance rather than simply as a historic individual, and he serves as a broader depiction of a freedom-loving Englishman. The musical score was written by William Alwyn, the first time he had written for a feature film. His score is generally considered far superior to the film itself.

Made during the Second World War, the film was intended in part as a propaganda effort to stir the United States out of isolationism and persuade it into joining the war on Britain's side, and was one of a series of historical films including The Prime Minister, The Young Mr. Pitt, and The Great Mr. Handel which were made at the same time, as well as Thunder Rock and 49th Parallel which portrayed a similar message in a contemporary setting.

== Reception ==
The film received universally bad reviews which criticised the lack of vitality in the historical figures who often resembled stereotypes.

The New York Times observed "Penn is definitely not one of England's better film efforts".

Evans' portrayal of Penn was generally praised for his "sympathetic" performance.

== Bibliography ==
- Capua, Michelangelo. Deborah Kerr: A Biography. McFarland & Company, 2010.
- Johnson, Ian. William Alwyn: the art of film music. The Boydell Press, 2005.
- McFarlane, Brian. Lance Comfort. Manchester University Press, 1999.
