= Contraband (1940 film) =

1940 British film by Michael Powell

Contraband (Blackout)
- Poster from trade screening 20 March 1940
- Directed by: Michael Powell
- Written by: Scenario: Michael Powell; Brock Williams
- Screenplay by: Emeric Pressburger
- Story by: Emeric Pressburger
- Produced by: John Corfield
- Starring: Conrad Veidt; Valerie Hobson
- Cinematography: Freddie Young
- Edited by: John Seabourne
- Music by: Richard Addinsell; John Greenwood
- Production company: British National Films
- Distributed by: Anglo-American
- Release dates: 11 May 1940 (UK); 29 November 1940 (U.S.)
- Running time: 92 minutes (UK); 80 minutes (U.S.)
- Country: United Kingdom
- Language: English
- Budget: £35,000
- Box office: 1,385,365 admissions (France)

Contraband (U.S.: Blackout) is a 1940 wartime spy film by the British director-writer team of Michael Powell and Emeric Pressburger, which reunited stars Conrad Veidt and Valerie Hobson after their earlier appearance in The Spy in Black the previous year. On this occasion, Veidt plays a hero, something he did not do very often, and there is also an early (uncredited) performance by Leo Genn.

The title of the film in the United States was Blackout. Powell writes in his autobiography, A Life in Movies, as saying that the U.S. renaming was a better title and he wished he had thought of it.

== Plot ==
Danish Captain Andersen and his freighter Helvig are stopped in the English Channel by Lt. Commanders Ashton and Ellis for a cargo inspection in a British Contraband Control Port as World War II is slowly consuming Europe, despite Denmark being neutral.

He receives two shore passes for himself and his First Officer Axel Skold to dine with Ashton and Ellis, but the passes (and Helvig's motorboat) are stolen by passengers Mrs. Sorensen and talent scout Mr. Pidgeon. From a cut-out newspaper train schedule, Andersen is able to figure out they are taking a train to London and catches up with them; but, when the train arrives in the blacked-out metropolis, he is only able to hold on to Mrs. Sorensen.

He invites her to dine at the restaurant of Skold's brother Erik. Then she takes him to the home of her aunt, where they are captured by a Nazi spy ring led by Van Dyne, a man Mrs. Sorensen has already had unpleasant dealings with in Düsseldorf, Germany. Van Dyne knows Mrs. Sorensen and Pidgeon are British agents. Van Dyne finds a message hidden on one of Mrs. Sorensen's cigarette papers, identifying her as "M47" and listing the names of neutral ships under which two German vessels are traveling. He decides to replace one of the names with that of an American ship to cause trouble, the United States being neutral at this time. Mrs. Sorensen and Andersen are tied up, but the captain manages to escape. He brings back reinforcements in the form of Erik Skold's staff and is able to free Mrs. Sorensen and knock out Van Dyne. With everything cleared up, Capt. Andersen and Mrs. Sorensen resume their sea voyage.

== Cast ==
- Conrad Veidt as Capt. Andersen
- Valerie Hobson as Mrs Sorensen
- Hay Petrie as Axel Skold/Erik Skold
- Joss Ambler as Lt. Cmdr. Ashton, RNR
- Raymond Lovell as Van Dyne
- Esmond Knight as Mr Pidgeon
- Charles Victor as Hendrick
- Phoebe Kershaw as Miss Lang
- Harold Warrender as Lt. Cmdr. Ellis, RN
- John Longden as Passport Officer
- Eric Maturin as Passport Officer
- Paddy Browne as Singer in "Regency"
- Dennis Arundell as Lieman
- Molly Hamley-Clifford as Baroness Hekla
- Eric Berry as Mr Abo
- Olga Edwardes as Mrs Abo

=== Cast notes ===
- Leo Genn and Peter Bull as two of Van Dyne's associates
- Bernard Miles in an amusing scene arguing with two air raid wardens
- Esma Cannon as Hay Petrie's niece
- Michael Shepley as the helpful man in the club
- Milo O'Shea made his film debut, in the uncredited role of an air raid warden.

== Production ==
Contraband was intended as a followup to Powell and Pressburger's The Spy in Black, which was filmed at the end of 1938, but was not released by Alexander Korda for almost a year. The current film was in production from 16 December 1939 through 27 January 1940 at Denham Film Studios, with location shooting in London at Chester Square in Belgravia, and in Ramsgate in Kent. It was the first prestige picture from British National Pictures.

== Critical reception ==
According to Kinematograph Weekly the film did well at the British box office in May 1940.

The TV Guide online review called it "An odd little comic thriller - who, except perhaps Michael Powell, would cast 47-year-old Cabinet of Dr. Caligari (1920) star Conrad Veidt as a light romantic hero?"

Time Out wrote that "Less stylish than The Spy in Black, this espionage thriller is more fun, with its tongue-in-cheek plot revelling in Hitchcockian eccentricities". Radio Times describes it as "A neat Second World War espionage thriller that depicts a London crawling with spies".

Dennis Schwartz of Ozus' World Movie Reviews had mixed feelings, giving it a grade of B−. "The brisk pace and its added touches of quaintness, made the film endearing inspite [sic] of the lack of any character study and the one-dimensional tone of the villains." However, he wondered "how much better a more romantically inclined hero would have fared in his [Veidt's] role."
