= Lady from Lisbon =

- Richard Hearne
- Directed by: Leslie S. Hiscott
- Written by: Michael Barringer
- Produced by: Elizabeth Hiscott
- Starring: Francis L. Sullivan; Jane Carr; Martita Hunt; Charles Victor
- Cinematography: Erwin Hillier
- Edited by: Peter Tanner
- Music by: W.L. Trytel (uncredited)
- Production companies: British National Films; Shaftesbury Films
- Distributed by: Anglo-American Film Corporation (UK)
- Release date: September 1942 (UK)
- Running time: 75 minutes
- Country: United Kingdom
- Language: English

Lady from Lisbon is a 1942 British comedy film directed by Leslie S. Hiscott and starring Francis L. Sullivan, Jane Carr, Martita Hunt and Charles Victor.

It was shot at the Riverside Studios in London. The film's sets were designed by the art director James A. Carter.

== Plot ==
When the Nazis steal Leonardo da Vinci's Mona Lisa, South American art lover Minghetti travels to Lisbon to spy for the Germans in return for the famous painting.

Inept Nazi agents, counterspies, racketeers and multiple fakes of the masterpiece soon confound all attempts.

The artist Ganier is murdered. Lady Wellington Smyth is accused.

The painting is swapped for a poor copy under Minghetti's nose.

== Cast ==
- Francis L. Sullivan as Minghetti
- Jane Carr as Tamara
- Martita Hunt as Susan Wellington Smythe
- George Street as Hauptmann
- Gerhardt Kempinski as Flugel
- Tony Holles as Anzoni
- Leo De Pokorny as Mario
- Wilfrid Hyde White as Ganier
- Ian Fleming as Adams
- Charles Victor as Porter
- John Godfrey as Clerk

== Production ==
Filming started 11 May 1942 at Hammersmith.
