= Meet Mr. Penny =

- Directed by: David MacDonald
- Written by: Victor Kendall; Doreen Montgomery
- Based on: radio series by Maurice Moiseiwitsch
- Produced by: John Corfield
- Starring: Richard Goolden; Vic Oliver; Fabia Drake
- Cinematography: Bryan Langley
- Production company: British National Films
- Distributed by: Associated British Film Distributors
- Release date: June 1938
- Running time: 70 minutes
- Country: United Kingdom
- Language: English
- Budget: £20,212

Meet Mr. Penny is a 1938 British comedy film directed by David MacDonald and starring Richard Goolden, Vic Oliver and Fabia Drake. It was written by Victor Kendal and Doreen Montgomery based on the BBC radio series The Strange Adventures of Mr. Penny (1936) by Maurice Moiseiwitsch, in which Goolden played Mr. Penny.

== Premise ==
Timid solicitor's clerk Henry Penny and his neighbours attempt to prevent the destruction of their local vegetable-growing allotment, on which property tycoon Mr Allgood plans to build a warehouse.

== Cast ==
- Richard Goolden as Henry Penny
- Vic Oliver as Allgood
- Fabia Drake as Annie Penny
- Kay Walsh as Peggy Allgood
- Patrick Barr as Clive Roberts
- Hermione Gingold as Mrs. Wilson
- Wilfrid Hyde-White as Mr. Wilson
- Charles Farrell as Jackson
- Hal Walters as Cecil
- Joss Ambler as Gridley
- Jack Raine as Preston
- Renee Gadd as Mrs. Brown
- Tom Gill
- Daphne Raglan
- Gilbert Davis

== Production ==
It was made at Welwyn Studios by British National Films.

In August 1937 it was announced John Corfeld of British National had secured the film rights.

The film was intended to be the first in a series of Mr Penny movies, the unproduced sequel being The Pennys Abroad.

== Reception ==
The Monthly Film Bulletin wrote: "Richard Goolden's brilliant broadcast improvisations as Mr. Penny were a joy to many listeners, and it was inevitable that sooner or later a character with so wide and ready-made an appeal should be claimed by the cinema and seen as well as heard. Such a transformation is not without its dangers, for Mr. Penny is an artist in words, and the cinema is a record of action; but though it sometimes appears that Richard Goolden finds the pace of this boisterous farce a little too much for him, when all is said and done Mr. Penny's many friends will find in his performance the authentic Mr. Penny of their imagination. ... The production is competent, if unadventurous, and the film will have a very wide appeal."

Kine Weekly wrote: "Refreshing comedy of suburbia, put over by the shy humour of Richard Goolden, popular radio character comedian. Story complications seldom deviate from hide-bound theatrical convention, and there is considerably more talk than direct action, but the atmosphere is lifelike, and so are the types. Friendliness of fundamentals and directorial shrewdness conserve mass and family appeal. Good popular light entertainment, with a ready-made public in the star's considerable fans."

Picturegoer wrote: "A popular radio character-comedian, Richard Goolden, makes a very good impression in his screen debut but the material at his command is very theatrical and too full of verbiage for complete success. ... Vic Oliver is very good as the financier, as is Fabia Drake as Mrs. Penny. There is a slight, conventional love interest, introduced competently by Kay Walsh and Patrick Barr. Sound support comes from Charles Farrell and John Ambler. Domestic humour is good, but some of the farcical situations seem rather dated."

The Evening Chronicle wrote "the material is not always cinematic but admirers of Mr Penny will find it entertaining."

The Guardian felt "the London atmosphere is well caught and the whole film is mildly satisfying."

== Bibliography ==
- Wood, Linda. British Films, 1927-1939. British Film Institute, 1986.
