= Marjorie Browne =

British actress (1910–1990)

- 1939 Spotlight photo
- Born: 13 March 1910; Manchester, Lancashire, England
- Died: 21 October 1990 (aged 80)
- Occupation: Actress
- Spouse: Trevor Reeve (m. 1941–1990)

Marjorie Browne, Lady Reeve (1910–1990) was a British musical theatre actress who made occasional films.

Her West End appearances included the original productions of Cole Porter's Wake Up and Dream at the London Pavilion in 1929; Stanley Lupino's musical Sporting Love at the Gaiety in 1934; and as Marjanah in the revival of Chu Chin Chow at the Palace in 1940.

== Filmography ==
- Lassie from Lancashire (1938)
- Laugh It Off (1940)
- I Didn't Do It (1945)
