= Secret Journey (1939 film) =

- American poster
- Directed by: John Baxter
- Written by: Michael Hogan
- Based on: story 'Lone Wolves,’ by Charles Robert Dumas
- Produced by: John Corfield
- Starring: Basil Radford; Silvia St. Claire; Thorley Walters
- Cinematography: James Wilson
- Music by: Kennedy Russell
- Production company: British National Films
- Distributed by: Anglo-American Film Corporation
- Release dates: 2 October 1939; October 1945 (reissue)
- Running time: 72 minutes
- Country: United Kingdom
- Language: English

Secret Journey is a 1939 British thriller film directed by John Baxter and starring Basil Radford, Silvia St. Claire and Thorley Walters. It was written by Michael Hogan.

It is a remake of the 1936 French film Wolves Between Them, itself based on a novel by Charles Robert-Dumas. It was released in the United States in 1940 as Among Human Wolves.

== Synopsis ==
The screenplay concerns a British agent who travels to Berlin to recover a top-secret invention that has been stolen by German intelligence.

== Cast ==
- Basil Radford as John Richardson
- Silvia St. Claire as Helen Richardson
- Thorley Walters as Max von Reimer
- Peter Gawthorne as Gen. von Reimer
- Tom Helm as Capt. Benoit
- Joss Ambler as Col. Blondin
- George Hayes as Insp. Walter
- Megs Jenkins as girl in glasses

== Production ==
The film was made at M.P. Studios, Elstree, by British National Films as a supporting feature. Filming finished in April 1939.

== Reception ==
The Monthly Film Bulletin wrote: "By more ambitious direction much more could have been made of this interesting story. After a promising beginning the film peters out into something very ordinary. Few of the supposedly tense situations are well sustained. Basil Radford impressed as the British Secret Service agent. The settings are appropriate."

Kinematograph Weekly called it "all very sweet and pretty but a modern audience is apt to demand more of espionage farce."

Picturegoer wrote: "The formula is fairly familiar. Action is sacrificed in the overstressing of the love interest, but the climax carries a fair thrill. Basil Radford plays Richardson in the well-known 'silly ass' secret service man tradition and Silvia St. Claire shows promise as Helen, but Thorley Walters overdoes the sensitive moments as Max and is frequently in danger of provoking laughs in the wrong places."

Picture Show wrote: "This picture, though not without sate fine melodramatic scenes, is very much the type of old-fashioned spy story which we enjoyed in the days of the silents. Nothing is left to the imagination, but some of the methods used appear to be very clumsy."

Variety called it "a consistently reasonable tale. with good, often brilliant dialog, splendid suspense, artistic production, good photography and intelligent direction. Acting is competent with the lone drawback being the lack of marquee names."

== Bibliography ==
- Wood, Linda. British Films, 1927-1939. British Film Institute, 1986.
