= John Paddy Carstairs =

British film director and artist (1910–1970)

John Paddy Carstairs

John Paddy Carstairs (born John Keys; 11 May 1910, in London – 12 December 1970, in London) was a British film director (1933–62) and television director (1962–64), usually of light-hearted subject matter. He was also a comic novelist and painter.

== Biography ==
The son of actor Nelson Keys, and the brother of director Anthony Nelson Keys, Carstairs changed his name to his mother's surname in order to avoid the appearance of nepotism. He directed 37 films in total. He had a long association with the character of Simon Templar (the character's creator, Leslie Charteris, dedicated the 1963 book, The Saint in the Sun to Carstairs). Aside from directing the 1939 Saint film, The Saint in London, he also directed two episodes of The Saint in the 1960s, making him the only individual (other than Charteris himself) to be connected to both the Hollywood film and British series of The Saint.

Carstairs directed many British comedies including Norman Wisdom's first six films.

Filmink magazine argued Carstairs had "a style as recogniseable as any British auteur – we’re surprised more academics don’t discuss him."

== Death ==
Carstairs died of a heart attack on 12 December 1970, aged 60.

== Select bibliography ==
- Movie Merry-Go-Round (1937)
- Vinegar and Brown Paper (1939)
- Nicer to Stay in Bed (1940)
- Bunch: A biography of Nelson Keys (1941)
- Whatho she bumps ! (1941)
- Honest Injun (1942)
- But Wishes Aren't Horses (1942)
- Rain on Her Face (1943)
- Down the Wide Stream (1943)
- Gremlins in the Cabbage Patch (1944)
- No Music in the Nightingale (1944)
- Hadn't We the Gaiety (1945)
- Lillipop Wood. A story for children (1945)
- Magical was the Moment (1945)
- Kaleidoscope and a Jaundiced Eye (1946)
- Kimmie by John Paddy Carstairs (1946)
- Nothing Happens Mondays (1947)
- Love and Ella Rafferty (1947)
- My Fancy has Wings (1948)
- Solid! Said the Earl (1948)
- Fingle-Fangle (1949)
- Tinsel and Stars (1950)
- Call No Man Faithful (1951)
- Exultation of Skylarks (1952)
- Hope Comes on the South Wind (1953)
- Paintings and Watercolours (1955)
- Sunshine and Champagne (1955)
- Gardenias Bruise Easily (1958)
- Watercolour is Fun (1958)
- No Wooden Overcoat (1959)
- Touch a French Pompom (1960)
- Pardon My Gun (1962)
- The Concrete Kimono (1965)
- A Smell of Peardrops (1966)
- No Thanks for the Shroud (1967)

== Selected filmography ==
- A Honeymoon Adventure (1931, screenwriter)
- The Water Gipsies (1932, screenwriter)
- Nine till Six (1932, screenwriter)
- The Impassive Footman (1932, screenwriter)
- Love on the Spot (1932, screenwriter)
- It's a Boy (1933, screenwriter)
- Paris Plane (1933)
- Boomerang (1934)
- Gay Love (1934)
- It's a Cop (1934, screenwriter)
- Lost in the Legion (1934, screenwriter)
- Falling in Love (1935)
- While Parents Sleep (1935, screenwriter)
- Two's Company (1936, screenwriter)
- The Captain's Table (1936, screenwriter)
- Holiday's End (1937)
- Double Exposures (1937)
- Night Ride (1937)
- Missing, Believed Married (1937)
- Incident in Shanghai (1938)
- Lassie from Lancashire (1938)
- A Yank at Oxford (1938, screenwriter)
- The Saint in London (1939)
- The Lambeth Walk (1939, screenwriter)
- All Hands (1940)
- Meet Maxwell Archer (1940)
- Now You're Talking (1940)
- The Second Mr. Bush (1940)
- Dangerous Comment (1940)
- Telefootlers (1941)
- He Found a Star (1941)
- Spare a Copper (1941)
- Dancing with Crime (1947)
- Sleeping Car to Trieste (1948)
- Fools Rush In (1949)
- The Chiltern Hundreds (1949)
- Tony Draws a Horse (1950)
- Talk of a Million (1951)
- Made in Heaven (1952)
- Treasure Hunt (1952)
- Little Big Shot (1952, screenwriter)
- Top of the Form (1953)
- Trouble in Store (1953)
- Up to His Neck (1954)
- The Crowded Day (1954, story)
- One Good Turn (1955)
- Man of the Moment (1955)
- Jumping for Joy (1956)
- Up in the World (1956)
- Just My Luck (1957)
- The Big Money (1958)
- The Square Peg (1959)
- Tommy the Toreador (1959)
- And the Same to You (1960, screenwriter)
- Sands of the Desert (1960)
- A Weekend with Lulu (1961)
- The Devil's Agent (1962)
