= John Corfield =

British film producer (1893–1953)

- Born: 22 March 1893; Liverpool, Lancashire, England, United Kingdom
- Died: 10 January 1953 (aged 59); Surrey, England, United Kingdom
- Occupations: Film producer, art director
- Years active: 1935–1948

John Corfield (22 March 1893 – 10 January 1953) was a British film producer. For more than a decade he oversaw production at British National Films.

He left British national and in 1941 announced he was entering independent production starting with Ring o Roses which became He Found a Star.

== Selected filmography ==
- Turn of the Tide (1935)
- Debt of Honour (1936)
- Mr. Reeder in Room 13 (1938)
- Meet Mr. Penny (1938)
- Lassie from Lancashire (1938)
- Night Journey (1938)
- Secret Journey (1939)
- Dead Men Tell No Tales (1939)
- What Would You Do, Chums? (1939)
- Old Mother Riley Joins Up (1939)
- Contraband (1940)
- The Second Mr. Bush (1940)
- Gaslight (1940)
- He Found a Star (1941)
- One of Our Aircraft Is Missing (1942)
- Headline (1944)
