= Turn of the Tide (film) =

- British trade ad
- Directed by: Norman Walker
- Written by: L. du Garde Peach; J.O.C. Orton
- Based on: novel Three Fevers by Leo Walmsley
- Produced by: John Corfield
- Starring: John Garrick; Geraldine Fitzgerald; Wilfrid Lawson; Moore Marriott
- Cinematography: Franz Planer
- Edited by: Ian Dalrymple; Stephen Harrison; David Lean
- Music by: Arthur Benjamin
- Production company: British National Films
- Distributed by: Gaumont British Distributors
- Release date: 21 October 1935
- Running time: 80 minutes
- Country: United Kingdom
- Language: English
- Budget: £30,000
- Box office: £18,000

Turn of the Tide is a 1935 British drama film directed by Norman Walker and starring John Garrick, Geraldine Fitzgerald and Wilfrid Lawson. It was written by L. du Garde Peach and J.O.C. Orton based on the 1932 novel Three Fevers by Leo Walmsley.

It was the first feature film made by J. Arthur Rank.

== Plot ==
In the fictional Yorkshire fishing village of Bramblewick there is rivalry between two fishing families. Rivalry between the lobster fishermen begins when one boat is fitted with a new diesel engine. Ropes are cut so the lobsters cannot be retrieved. The feuding comes to an end when a man from one family says he wants to marry a girl from the other family.

== Cast ==
- John Garrick as Marney Lunn
- J. Fisher White as Isaac Fosdyck
- Geraldine Fitzgerald as Ruth Fosdyck
- Wilfrid Lawson as Luke Fosdyck
- Moore Marriott as Tindal Fosdyck
- Sam Livesey as Henry Lunn
- Niall MacGinnis as John Lunn
- Joan Maude as Amy Lunn
- Derek Blomfield as Steve Lunn
- Hilda Davies as Mrs. Lunn

== Production ==
J. Arthur Rank was a flour baron who had invested in some religious films. He read an article in the Evening News challenging criticism of the film industry by editor R.G. Burnett complaining about the moral standing of movies, and challenging them to produce a family appropriate movie, even suggesting a book: Leo Walmsley’s Three Fevers. Rank decided to do this.

He formed an assocaion with Annie Henrietta Yule, widow of an Anglo-Indian jute baron, who was, like Rank, a wealthy Methodist. They formed British National Films Company in 1934 and Turn of the Tide would be the first commercial film from the company. John Corfeld, who introduced Yule to Rank, produced the film.

The film was shot near Whitby, Yorkshire with interiors shot at British & Dominions' studio, Elstree. The film contains many Whitby registered boats (WY) and much documentary-style footage of making and repairing lobster creels.

David Lean worked on the film uncredited as an editor. Ian Dalyrymple also worked uncredited.

Rank was unhappy with the efforts of the distributor, Gaumont British. This prompted him to buy into distribution, production and exhibition interests, such as General Film Distributors and Pinewood Studios, launching his film empire.

== Reception ==
Although the film was originally considered a box-office disappointment it was voted the sixth best British movie of 1936.

The Monthly Film Bulletin wrote: "The simple and unaffected dialogue and the genuine open-air atmosphere of this film give it an unusual charm. The acting, notably that of Geraldine Fitzgerald as Ruth Fosdyck, is very good and in the right key ... The photography and choice of settings, both natural and architectural, are extremely good. The story (which is adapted from a novel) is not altogether convincing ... but the settings and the acting have an air of genuineness about them which makes the film most refreshing."

Writing for The Spectator in 1935, Graham Greene remarked that the film was "unpretentious and truthful", and "one of the best English films [he] ha[d] yet seen". Rejecting contemporary critical comparison of the film to Man of Aran, Greene suggested that where Man of Aran had featured sentimentality, Turn of the Tide's director "Norman Walker is concerned with truth, [...] and the beauty his picture catches is that of exact statement".

Variety called it "slow moving".

== Notes ==
- Wood, Alan (1952). Mr. Rank: A Study of J. Arthur Rank and British Films. Hodder and Stoughton.
