= Richard Goolden =

British actor (1895–1981)

Goolden, circa late 1930s

Richard Percy Herbert Goolden, OBE (23 February 1895 – 18 June 1981) was a British actor, most famous for his portrayal of Mole from Kenneth Grahame's 1908 children's book The Wind in the Willows in A A Milne's 1929 stage adaptation, Toad of Toad Hall.

Goolden took up the stage after serving in the army in the First World War. From the start of his career he was cast in character parts, usually elderly. He played more than 500 roles in a career that lasted more than fifty years, and embraced the classics, farce, opera bouffe, radio, films and television. He first played Mole in 1930 and took the part in numerous revivals until his retirement in 1980. He created roles in new plays by Samuel Beckett and Tom Stoppard, and, in his last year, in the radio series The Hitchhiker's Guide to the Galaxy and the television drama Cribb.

== Life and career ==
=== Early years ===
Goolden was born in London, the son of a barrister, Percy Pugh Goolden Goolden [sic], and his wife Margarida, née da Costa Ricci. He was educated at Charterhouse, where his impersonation of the headmaster delighted the headmaster's wife and everybody except possibly the headmaster, who counselled him to "aim at good taste in the use of his gifts". From Charterhouse he went up to New College, Oxford; his university career was interrupted by the First World War. From 1915 to 1918 he was a private in the Royal Army Medical Corps in France (serving in the same unit as Ralph Vaughan Williams), ending the war as acting unpaid lance corporal. Returning to Oxford at the end of the war he took an honours degree in French literature in 1923. He was appointed secretary of the Oxford University Dramatic Society, with whom he visited Scandinavia, appearing in Galsworthy's Loyalties and A A Milne's Mr Pim Passes By. He counted the role of Mr Pim as one of his three favourites, together with Mole in Toad of Toad Hall and the Fool in King Lear. He appeared as Dolon in Cyril Bailey's production (in the original Greek) of the Euripides tragedy Rhesus.

In October 1923 Goolden made his first professional appearance on stage. For J B Fagan's company at the Oxford Playhouse he played Mazzini Dunn in Bernard Shaw's Heartbreak House. He later commented, "Shaw was a bloody nuisance; he used to read all the parts himself, convulsed by his own wit – especially the women's parts; he loved mincing up and down." Goolden was a member of Fagan's company for seven years, playing fifty characters. While still a member of the Oxford company he appeared in Stratford-upon-Avon and in the West End. At Stratford in 1925 he played Clown (Young Shepherd) in The Winter's Tale with the young John Laurie as Autolycus. In London, in the same year, he played Owain Flatfish in Fagan's production of Richard Hughes's A Comedy of Good and Evil at the Ambassadors. Praising his performance, The Times called him "a fishmonger, a guardian angel and a solemn jester rolled generously into one." In the same year he played the aged butler Firs in Fagan's production of The Cherry Orchard at the Royalty, London. The Times later noted that he was only thirty when he played the role, and in his early years was usually happier when cast as characters twice his age. In this role Goolden had, said the paper, "an inspired rightness".

=== Hammersmith, West End and Mr Mole ===
Nigel Playfair had seen Goolden's performances at Stratford, on the strength of which he invited him to appear with his company at the Lyric, Hammersmith. He was in the Lyric's revue, Riverside Nights (1926) and played the professor of philosophy in Molière's The Would-Be Gentleman (1926) in a cast headed by Playfair and including Sydney Fairbrother, Miles Malleson and James Whale.

Over the next three decades Goolden generally divided his theatrical career between Shakespeare and more recent classics, new plays – mostly ephemeral, and his perennial role of Mole in A A Milne's Toad of Toad Hall, based on Kenneth Grahame's The Wind in the Willows. His Shakespeare roles included Costard (Love's Labours Lost, 1932), Aguecheek (Twelfth Night, 1933), Quince (A Midsummer Night's Dream, 1938), Fool (King Lear, 1943), Young Gobbo (The Merchant of Venice, 1944), Roderigo (Othello, 1944), Polonius (Hamlet, 1944) and Lepidus (Anthony and Cleopatra, 1951), Shallow (The Merry Wives of Windsor, 1968), Old Gobbo (The Merchant of Venice, 1969), Verges (Much Ado About Nothing, 1970), the Pedant (The Taming of the Shrew, 1975), Sir Nathaniel (Love's Labour's Lost, 1976), and the King of France (Henry V, 1977).

Goolden first played Mole in 1930. In his later years he was so closely associated with the part that many assumed he had created it. In fact it had been created by Alan Webb at the premiere in Liverpool the previous year; Goolden said of Webb, "He was very good, but felt foolish playing an animal." At Milne's recommendation Goolden auditioned for the role of Badger in the first London production; he then auditioned for Ratty, and only after that was he cast in the role that became synonymous with his name. He played the part in revivals from the 1930s to the end of the 1970s. Among those with whom he appeared in the play were Wendy Toye, Leslie Henson. Michael Blakemore, Ian Wallace, Michael Bates, and Nicky Henson, The Variety Club of Great Britain gave him a special award in 1976 for his appearances as Mole. He commented, "The last thing I ever won was a medal for running when I was a youth. Today I feel less like a mole and really rather more like an elderly chimpanzee."

=== Other roles ===
Goolden appeared in more than 500 stage roles. He attributed this large total to his habit of getting himself cast in plays that failed. He recalled one of the worst: "It lasted five nights and [we] were given notice after the first. One matinée was cancelled because they had sold no tickets at all for that performance. Still, [we] had two nice parties, one to open and one to close, within a week."

On radio Goolden played the part of Mr Chips, adapted from the novel by James Hilton. He then achieved popularity as the comic character Mr Penny, "a timid fellow, who went quietly off to the office each morning only to be involved in some extraordinary adventure". Goolden appeared in films including Whom the Gods Love (1936), In the Doghouse (1961), It's All Happening (1963), The Amorous Adventures of Moll Flanders (1965), It! (1967), and Joseph Andrews (1977). For BBC television he played a range of roles, including Pond, the headmaster, in The Happiest Days of Your Life (1947), the title role in The Magistrate (1951), Mr Dick in David Copperfield (1956), Cinna the poet in Julius Caesar (1959), and Albert in The Flaxton Boys (1970).

In his entry in Who's Who, Goolden wrote that he had played "a diversity of parts ranging from traditional classical repertoire to Farce, Opera Bouffe, Revue, Single Act Variety and Seaside Piers." One of the farces was Charley's Aunt, in which he played the principal role of Babbs in 1938 at the Haymarket; another was Look After Lulu, by Georges Feydeau adapted by Noël Coward, in 1959. The opera bouffe was Offenbach's The Grand Duchess at Daly's Theatre in 1937. One of his less typical roles was Nagg in the premiere of Endgame, Beckett's English version of his play Fin de partie. A lasting friendship grew between the playwright and the actor.

Goolden's last new stage role of note was in Stoppard's Dirty Linen and New-Found-Land in 1976. He played Bernard, a very senior civil servant who rambles reminiscently about Lloyd George and General Haig before dozing off while his younger colleague (Arthur, played by Stephen Moore) extols the beauties of America at mesmeric length. When Toad of Toad Hall was revived during the Christmas season, Goolden, by then in his early eighties, played three performances a day: two matinées as Mole and the evening show as Bernard.

Goolden's last role was on radio as Zaphod Beeblebrox IV in The Hitchhiker's Guide to the Galaxy, broadcast in January 1980. In November 1980, following a stay in hospital, he appeared as a guest on an episode of This Is Your Life for actor Peter Bowles. That same year Goolden announced his retirement. He died the following year in St Stephen's Hospital, Fulham, near the Chelsea house in which he had lived since 1924. He was unmarried.
