= Louis H. Jackson =

British film producer (1904–1960)

- Born: 1904; London, United Kingdom
- Died: 1960 (aged 55–56); London, United Kingdom
- Occupation: Producer
- Years active: 1944–1948 (film)

Louis H. Jackson (1904–1960) was a British film producer. He oversaw production at British National Films during the 1940s.

== Selected filmography ==
- Waltz Time (1945)
- Twilight Hour (1945)
- Loyal Heart (1946)
- The Trojan Brothers (1946)
- The Laughing Lady (1946)
- Green Fingers (1947)
- Woman to Woman (1947)

== Bibliography ==
- Harper, Sue. Women in British Cinema: Mad, Bad and Dangerous to Know. A&C Black, 2000.
