= Man of the World (TV series) =

British TV drama series (1962–1963)

- Titlecard of the pilot episode, which was filmed in colour.
- Created by: Leslie Harris
- Starring: Craig Stevens; Tracy Reed
- Theme music composer: Henry Mancini
- Composers: Ivor Slaney; Edwin Astley
- Country of origin: United Kingdom
- Original language: English
- No. of series: 2
- No. of episodes: 20 (list of episodes)

Production
- Executive producer: Leslie Harris
- Producer: Harry Fine
- Cinematography: Brendan J. Stafford; Walter J. Harvey
- Running time: 49 min.
- Production company: ATV

Original release
- Network: ITV
- Release: 29 September 1962 – 22 June 1963

Related
- The Sentimental Agent

Man of the World is an ATV drama series, distributed by ITC Entertainment. The show ran in the United Kingdom in 1962 and 1963 for 20 one-hour episodes in monochrome.

== Plot ==
The series stars Craig Stevens as Michael Strait, a world-renowned photographer whose assignments lead him into investigating mysterious goings-on amongst the rich and glamorous and intrigue from far-flung places such as Iraq, French Indochina and Algiers. Tracy Reed co-stars in the first series.

== Cast ==
=== Main cast ===
- Craig Stevens as Michael Strait
- Tracy Reed as Maggie MacFarlane (Series 1)

=== Guest cast ===
- Alfred Burke, Shirley Eaton, Burt Kwouk, Anthony Quayle, Warren Mitchell, Leela Naidu, Eric Pohlmann, Donald Sutherland, Carlos Thompson, Patrick Troughton, Sam Wanamaker, Patrick Wymark, John Meillon

Craig Stevens and Tracy Reed

== Production ==
=== Music ===
The series' theme music was by Henry Mancini, with incidental music under the control of Ivor Slaney using many musical cues of Edwin Astley.

== Episodes ==
Airdate is for ATV London. ITV regions varied date and order.

Production number here refers to the order of the Network DVD.

=== Series one ===
Filmed on location and at Shepperton Studios

No. overall	No. in series	Title	Directed by	Written by	Original release date	Prod. code
1	1	"Death of a Conference"	David Greene	Tudor Gates and Robert E. Thompson	29 September 1962	102
When an Algerian revolutionary is assassinated at peace talks which Mike Strait is covering, he is plunged into mystery involving French nationalists and Algerian separatists. Stars Warren Mitchell, Patrick Troughton, John Carson, Gerald Flood, Zena Marshall and Alan Rowe.
2	2	"Masquerade in Spain"	David Greene	Lindsay Hardy	6 October 1962	101
Strait is assigned to take pictures of one of the richest women in the world, but he and the woman are kidnapped. Stars Graham Starke, Clifford Evans, Noel Coleman, George Coulouris and George Pastell. Pilot episode filmed in colour.
3	3	"Blaze of Glory"	Harry Booth	John Roddick	13 October 1962	104
Tony Gardner, an ace racing driver, refuses to accept that his eyesight is failing, putting his and other drivers' lives at risk, and Strait investigates a minor road accident he had the year before. Stars Graham Starke, Patricia Donahue, Peter Dyneley, Eric Pohlmann, Jane Merrow and Martin Miller.
4	4	"The Runaways"	Charles Crichton	Michael Pertwee	20 October 1962	103
An impressionable young heiress, Joanne, falls in love with a penniless conman, leading to disaster when Mike Strait decides to break them up with unexpected consequences for himself. Stars Noel Harrison, Erica Rogers and Renée Houston.
5	5	"The Frontier"	Anthony Bushell	Lindsay Galloway	27 October 1962	106
On the Indo-China border, Strait on assignment discovers Chinese soldiers occupying an Indian village while building a road. Strait with the help of a beautiful Indian doctor trick the Chinese into leaving but when their ruse fails, the doctor makes a dramatic sacrifice to save the threatened village. Stars Leela Naidu, Gary Raymond, Peter Arne, Alfred Burke, Burt Kwouk and George Little.
6	6	"The Sentimental Agent"	Charles Frend	Jack Davies	3 November 1962	108
In Havana, Cuba, Strait is jailed for taking pictures in a restricted area and a charming rogue comes to his aid. Stars Carlos Thompson, Shirley Eaton, Peter Jones, John Hollis, Cyril Shaps and Steve Plytas. Spin-off series The Sentimental Agent.
7	7	"The Highland Story"	Charles Frend	Lindsay Galloway	10 November 1962	105
Assigned to report on the Scottish clan system, Strait finds the residents of a village not very forthcoming when the protection of the clan includes killers from Australia. Stars Finlay Currie, John Laurie, Noelle Middleton, Ray Barrett, Kenneth Watson, Andrew Downie and Patsy Smart.
8	8	"The Nature of Justice"	Harry Booth	Tudor Gates	17 November 1962	107
Strait is assigned to cover a story in Iraq about a famous archaeologist who allows greed to compromise his principles over the discovery of an ancient stone tablet. Stars Robert Flemyng, Bernard Archard, Ewen Solon, Jacqueline Ellis, Michael Mellinger and Glenn Beck.
9	9	"The Mindreader"	Anthony Bushell	Wilton Schiller and Robert E. Thompson	24 November 1962	109
A girl's ability to read minds threatens her health and a normal life unless Strait uncovers if she is a fraud or there is a scientific explanation. Stars Juliet Mills, Moira Redmond, Patrick Wymark, Jack Watson, Leslie French and Alec Ross.
10	10	"Portrait of a Girl"	Charles Crichton	Michael Pertwee	1 December 1962	111
Strait meets Joanne again and finds himself involved in a fraud to extract money from her father by selling a fake painting by Thomas Gainsborough. Stars Erica Rogers, Colin Gordon, Donald Stewart, Michael Goodliffe, Bessie Love, Neil McCarthy and John Glyn-Jones with an uncredited appearance by Donald Sutherland.
11	11	"Specialist for the Kill"	Jeremy Summers	Lindsay Hardy	8 December 1962	110
The CIA employs Strait to photograph passengers arriving on a plane in West Germany to identify a unique assassin intent on killing the East German president who is making a visit to the American sector. Stars Derren Nesbitt, Paul Maxwell, Kenny Baker, George Pravda, Oscar Quitak and Gábor Baraker.
12	12	"A Family Affair"	Anthony Bushell	Norman Borisoff and Robert E. Thompson	15 December 1962	112
In Paris for a fashion shoot, Strait is caught up in an explosion and when his film of the devastation is confiscated by a bogus policeman, Strait becomes involved in the supposed death of a dangerous OAS fanatic. Stars Lisa Page, Richard Warner, Eugene Deckers, Paul Whitsun-Jones, Alan Gifford, Keith Pyott and Richard Leech.
13	13	"Shadow of the Wall"	Harry Booth	Ian Stuart Black	22 December 1962	113
Strait goes to West Berlin for a photo shoot and stumbles into a spy plot where his friend, with a young English wife, has been arrested for passing secrets to the east with evidence provided by Strait. Stars Paul Maxwell, Suzanne Neve, Joseph Fürst, Charles Lloyd-Pack, Sheila Raynor and Steven Scott

=== Series two ===
No. overall	No. in series	Title	Directed by	Written by	Original release date	Prod. code
14	1	"The Bandit"	Charles Crichton	John Pudney and Ian Stuart Black	11 May 1963	114
While photographing a Greek temple in Sicily, Strait becomes involved with a charismatic bandit who has kidnapped a tempestuous actress. Strait has to play cards with the bandit to save his and the girl's life. Stars Sam Wanamaker, Natasha Parry, John Woodvine, Robert Rietti, Gertan Klauber and Nigel Hawthorne.
15	2	"The Enemy"	John Llewellyn Moxey	Julian Bond	18 May 1963	115
Strait, on assignment in Vietnam, is ambushed and is treated at a mission run by an Italian doctor who has rejected western values. Communist troops take over the mission and put the doctor on trial for allowing freedoms of thought and Christian beliefs. Sentenced to death, Strait is given help from a surprising quarter to free the doctor. Stars Anthony Quayle, John Meillon, Tsai Chin and John Hollis.
16	3	"Double Exposure"	Jeremy Summers	Jack Davies	25 May 1963	117
The CIA asks Strait to go undercover as the chauffeur of an eccentric old lady and go behind the Iron Curtain on her annual holiday to take the waters. The aim is to photograph a general who the CIA believes has died and been replaced by a double. Stars Nigel Davenport, Cicely Courtneidge, Brian Wright, Erika Remberg and John Tate.
17	4	"Jungle Mission"	Harry Booth	Lindsay Galloway	1 June 1963	116
Strait flies to the Amazon jungle in search of a story about a rebel leader and encounters an order of nuns trying to establish a mission in the face of opposition from the local headhunting natives. Stars Paul Maxwell, Alexander Davion, Noelle Middleton, Alan Rowe, Kenneth Farrington and Isobel Black.
18	5	"In the Picture"	John Llewellyn Moxey	Brian Clemens	8 June 1963	118
An exhibition of Strait's photographs reveals the existence of a secret plot to assassinate a European president and leads the plotters to destroy the exhibition and negatives, always one step ahead of Strait. Stars Wensley Pithey, Albert Lieven, Nadja Regin, Maurice Kaufmann, Bartlett Mullins, André Maranne, Peter Madden and Edward Cast.
19	6	"The Bullfighter"	Harry Booth	Marc Brandel	15 June 1963	119
Photographing a young bullfighter, Strait finds someone is prepared to go to any lengths to stop the young man becoming famous as he follows in his father's footsteps. Stars Ferdy Mayne, Marla Landi, Joseph Cuby, Eileen Way, John Bailey and Michael Peake.
20	7	"The Prince"	Charles Crichton	Arthur Berlin	22 June 1963	120
In Loscha, a small country between Burma and China, Strait becomes involved in establishing the identity of a 12-year-old boy who may be a prince, in order to avert a revolution. Stars Geoffrey Keen, Michael Sirr, Larry Cross and Robert Arden.
