= The Sentimental Agent =

1963 British television drama series

- Created by: Leslie Harris
- Starring: Carlos Thompson; John Turner; Burt Kwouk; Clemence Bettany
- Theme music composer: Ivor Slaney
- Composers: Ivor Slaney; Edwin Astley
- Country of origin: United Kingdom
- Original language: English
- No. of series: 1
- No. of episodes: 13 (list of episodes)

Production
- Executive producer: Leslie Harris
- Producer: Harry Fine
- Cinematography: Brendan J. Stafford
- Running time: 49 mins
- Production company: ATV

Original release
- Network: ITV
- Release: 28 September – 21 December 1963

Related
- Man of the World

The Sentimental Agent is a television drama series spin-off from Man of the World. It was produced in the United Kingdom in 1963 by Associated Television and distributed by ITC Entertainment.

The series ran for 13 one-hour monochrome episodes. Some of the episodes were edited into the feature film Our Man in the Caribbean (1962).

== Plot ==
The series stars Carlos Thompson as Carlos Varela, a successful Argentinian import-export agent based in London.

Varela's company takes him into unusual and sometimes dangerous situations. He is always impeccably dressed, cigar smoking and using his wit, ingenuity, and charm, which often involve a damsel in distress. He is assisted by Chin, a resourceful Chinese manservant, and Miss Carter, an ultra-efficient secretary.

Later episodes introduced Bill Randall, a businessman, who becomes the boyfriend of Miss Carter and then an employee of Varela.

== Cast and characters ==
John Turner, Clemence Bettany, Carlos Thompson, and Burt Kwouk

- Carlos Thompson as Carlos Varela
- Burt Kwouk as Chin Sung
- John Turner as Bill Randall
- Clemence Bettany as Miss Suzy Carter

Carlos Thompson did not appear in production episodes 110, 111, 112, and only briefly at the beginning and end of 113.

Guest stars included: Warren Mitchell, Diana Rigg, Imogen Hassall, Patrick Troughton, Ann Bell, Carol Cleveland, Annette Andre, and Donald Sutherland.

== Episode list ==
Filmed on location and at Shepperton Studios

Airdate is for ATV London. ITV regions varied date and order.

Production number is of the Network DVD order.

No.	Title	Directed by	Written by	Original release date	Prod. code
1	"All That Jazz"	Charles Frend	Julian Bond	28 September 1963	101
Carlos Varela takes responsibility for a jazz group, The Arthur Rogers Jaz Quintet, that his company has been transporting around Europe on tour when Major Harold Nelson of MI.5 informs him that the group are sending information to spies and he wants to know how. Stars Anthony Bushell, Peter Arne and Anneke Wills.
2	"The Beneficiary"	John Paddy Carstairs	Julian Bond	5 October 1963	102
A Korean wartime colleague of Varela sends him a prearranged distress signal from Lisbon that spells danger. The friend is murdered and Varela goes to Lisbon and finds he is the beneficiary of a supposed key to a safe deposit box containing secret research papers into the perfecting of a new laser beam, but there is no key and interested parties are prepared to kill to obtain the papers. Stars Michael Godfrey, Derek Francis, Lubna Aziz, Aubrey Morris, Bill Mitchell, Robert Rietti and David Graham.
3	"Express Delivery"	Charles Frend	Lindsay Hardy	12 October 1963	103
When on business in Poland, Varela finds he is being harassed by the police and decides to take the express train back to Vienna. He is befriended by a young girl, Katrina who wants to escape the iron curtain using Varela as cover but is she a spy and for which side? And who are their fellow passengers? Stars Ann Bell, Patrick Magee and Donald Morley.
4	"Never Play Cards with Strangers"	John Paddy Carstairs	Julian Bond	19 October 1963	104
Varela hears that passengers who booked a cruise from his agency have been fleeced of their savings playing bridge and decides to board the ship in Marseilles to give the cardsharps a taste of their own medicine. He takes the daughter whose parents were victims but the trouble is he cannot play bridge. Help is at hand from Chin. Stars Suzanna Leigh, Donald Stewart, Bessie Love, Hugh McDermott, and Jack Melford.
5	"May the Saints Preserve Us"	Charles Frend	Patrick Campbell	26 October 1963	105
Varela has the unusual job of shipping an ancient Irish border castle to Texas. The local illegal potcheen makers do not like the idea but the castle's secret blocked passageway between the Republic of Ireland and Northern Ireland is a way to smuggle back a deported Irish writer, befriended by Varela, back into Britain. Stars Brian Phelan, Carol Cleveland, Godfrey Quigley and Kevin Flood.
6	"Meet My Son, Henry"	John Paddy Carstairs	Lindsay Hardy	2 November 1963	108
Henry, the son of one of Verela's clients, is a boy genius. When he buys an obscure book that has stolen top secret flight plans concealed within it, the thieves want the book and follow Henry on his way to Switzerland escorted by Miss Carter and Bill Randall who is employed by the boy's father. Stars John Turner, John Phillips, Glynn Edwards, Derren Nesbitt and Vladek Sheybal.
7	"A Little Sweetness and Light"	Harold French	Tudor Gates	9 November 1963	107
Informed that his business agent on a Greek island has been killed in a motoring accident, Varela investigates the man's death and the loss of business, and discovers the island and its bandit leader have come under the influence of gangster deported from Chicago. Stars Patrick Allen, Zena Marshall, Patrick Newell, Martin Miller and Eileen Way.
8	"The Height of Fashion"	Charles Frend	Peter and Betty Lambda	16 November 1963	110
Varela is abroad when Miss Carter is left with the problem of 30,000 unwanted horse blankets. Bill Randall visiting her for a dinner date takes over and with the help of a top model enters the cutthroat world of fashion and the forthcoming wedding of a royal princess. Stars Sue Lloyd, Dennis Price, Warren Mitchell and Anton Rodgers.
9	"A Very Desirable Plot"	Harry Booth	Brian Clemens	23 November 1963	109
When a conman is selling worthless plots of land in the Bahamas for which Mercury International is supplying prefabricated houses, the victims complain and Varela heads to the Bahamas to sort out the problem. Stars William Mervyn, Paul Maxwell, Diana Rigg, David Healy and Donald Sutherland.
10	"Finishing School"	Harry Fine	Peter and Betty Lambda	30 November 1963	111
Valera is in New York when a young girl goes missing from an exclusive ladies' finishing school where he is a school governor. Bill Randall, staying at Valera's London office, steps in to investigate at the headmistress's request. Stars Annette Andre, Susan Clark, Helen Cherry, and Andrew Ray.
11	"The Scroll of Islam"	John Paddy Carstairs	Jack Davies	7 December 1963	106
Varela is intrigued when two professors approach him to obtain photographs of a relic contained within a priceless casket, which could prove more important than the Dead Sea Scrolls. It means entering a small sheikdom with the help of the sheik's son, who has expensive tastes. Stars William Sylvester, Patrick Troughton, Frank Thornton, Alan Gifford, Clifford Elkin and Terence Brook.
12	"Not Quite Fully Covered"	Charles Frend	Leslie Harris and Roger East	14 December 1963	112
Valera is away and Bill Randall, now employed by Mercury International, goes to Beirut to escort a girl back to London but she has a priceless collection of French antiques and furniture she had smuggled from her homeland. To transport the goods requires a large insurance premium that the girl does not have. Randall agrees for Mercury International to pay the premium but the cargo is lost at sea. Stars Keith Baxter, Imogen Hassall, Reginald Beckwith, Cyril Shaps and Charles Lloyd-Pack.
13	"A Box of Tricks"	Harold French	Ian Stuart Black	21 December 1963	113
An £11 million gift, dollars for Europe, for the poor of Palabria is refused unless the five man committee each receive an expected bribe but a government inspector is investigating corruption. Varela is on a cruise so Bill Randall and Chin go to Palabria to pay the bribes under the inspector's nose. Stars Ferdy Mayne, Gary Raymond, Walter Gotell, George Pastell, Zena Marshall and Robert Rietti.

== Music ==
The series' theme music, "Carlos' Theme", was written by Ivor Slaney who was also the director of incidental music using some musical cues of Edwin Astley.

Slaney released "Carlos' Theme" as a single in September 1963 on the HMV record label, as did Johnny Keating in January 1964 on the Piccadilly label, but neither version reached the charts.

== DVD release ==
Network released the 13 episodes on DVD in April 2010.
