= Shadow of the Past =

- British trade ad
- Directed by: Mario Zampi
- Written by: Aldo De Benedetti; Ian Stuart Black
- Story by: Aldo De Benedetti
- Produced by: Mae Murray (Associate producer)
- Starring: Joyce Howard; Terence Morgan
- Cinematography: Hone Glendinning
- Edited by: Giulio Zampi
- Music by: Stanley Black
- Production company: Mario Zampi Productions (as Anglofilm)
- Distributed by: Columbia Pictures Corporation (UK)
- Release date: 4 September 1950 (UK)
- Running time: 83 minutes
- Country: United Kingdom
- Language: English

Shadow of the Past (also known as Lady in Black) is a 1950 British crime film directed by Mario Zampi and starring Joyce Howard, Terence Morgan, and Michael Medwin. The screenplay, by Aldo De Benedetti and Ian Stuart Black, involves a man who catches sight of a woman believed by everyone to be dead.

== Plot ==
In an apartment unused for two years, John Harding sees a mysterious woman dressed in black. He later discovers that the woman looks identical to the apartment owner's wife, thought to have died in a car accident. It transpires that she is in fact the late wife's sister, and that the wife had not died in an accident: she was murdered by her husband.

== Cast ==
- Joyce Howard as Lady in Black
- Terence Morgan as John Harding
- Michael Medwin as Dick Stevens
- Andrew Osborn as George Bentley
- Wylie Watson as caretaker
- Marie Ney as Mrs. Bentley
- Ella Retford as daily help
- Ronald Adam as solicitor
- Louise Gainsborough as Susie
- Ian Fleming as doctor

== Critical reception ==
The Monthly Film Bulletin wrote: "Although the melodrama is slow moving and artificial, curiosity is maintained since the secrets of the plot are kept to the end."

Kine Weekly wrote: "The picture has little reason and less logic, but its cast and camera are used to advantage and between them they create a good atmosphere of mystery."

Picturegoer wrote: "Terence Morgan does quite a good job as the forthright and gallant hero, and Joyce Howard flits to and fro elegantly as the shadowy heroine. But it is the cameraman, rather than the cast, who creates what tension there is and puts a few thrills into the climax. A cut above average crime-fiction, it has a strong appeal for women."

Picture Show wrote: "It is a little confusing but is efficiently acted and directed."

TV Guide gave the film two out of four stars and described it as a "modest murder mystery... Tightly paced with several highly tense sequences."

In British Sound Films: The Studio Years 1928–1959 David Quinlan rated the film as "average", writing: "Modest but quite tense; twists in the plot are well concealed."
