= She Died Young =

1938 novel

- French edition
- Author: Alan Kennington
- Language: English
- Genre: Mystery thriller
- Publisher: Jarrolds
- Publication date: 1938
- Media type: Print

She Died Young is a 1938 thriller novel by the British writer Alan Kennington. It was published in France in 1950 translated by Maurice-Bernard Endrèbe, himself a noted writer of crime novels.

== Adaptation ==
In 1956 the novel served as a basis for the film You Can't Escape starring Noelle Middleton, Guy Rolfe and Robert Urquhart.

== Bibliography ==
- Goble, Alan. The Complete Index to Literary Sources in Film. Walter de Gruyter, 1999.
