= World for Ransom =

1954 film by Robert Aldrich

- Theatrical release poster
- Directed by: Robert Aldrich (uncredited)
- Screenplay by: Lindsay Hardy; Hugo Butler (uncredited)
- Produced by: Bernard Tabakin; Robert Aldrich
- Starring: Dan Duryea; Gene Lockhart; Patric Knowles
- Cinematography: Joseph Biroc
- Edited by: Michael Luciano
- Music by: Frank De Vol
- Production company: Plaza Production
- Distributed by: Allied Artists Pictures
- Release dates: January 27, 1954 (Los Angeles); June 4, 1954 (New York)
- Running time: 82 minutes
- Country: United States
- Language: English
- Budget: $100,000
- Box office: 441,946 admissions (France)

World for Ransom is a 1954 American film noir drama directed by Robert Aldrich and starring Dan Duryea, Patric Knowles, Gene Lockhart, Reginald Denny and Nigel Bruce (in his final film role).

Many of the actors and sets used in the film were recycled from Duryea's television show China Smith.

== Plot ==
Mike Callahan is an Irish national and war veteran working in Singapore as a private detective. He takes a case from a former flame, now a nightclub singer, who suspects that her husband Julian March is involved in criminal activities.

Callahan learns that a man named Alexis Pederas has involved Julian in a plot to kidnap prominent nuclear scientist Sean O'Connor and hold him for ransom to the highest bidder. O'Connor is one of only four men in the world who knows how to detonate the hydrogen bomb.

== Cast ==
- Dan Duryea as Mike Callahan aka Corrigan
- Gene Lockhart as Alexis Pederas
- Patric Knowles as Julian March
- Reginald Denny as Major Ian Bone
- Nigel Bruce as Governor Sir Charles Crotts
- Marian Carr as Frenessey March
- Arthur Shields as O'Connor
- Douglass Dumbrille as Inspector McCollum
- Carmen D'Antonio as Dancer
- Keye Luke as Wong
- Clarence Lung as Johnny Chan
- Lou Nova as Guzik
- Beal Wong as Wu, Bartender
- Strother Martin as Corporal
- Patrick Allen as Soldier
- Spencer Chan as Club Patron
- Herschel Graham as Club Patron

== Production ==
Aldrich was inspired to produce the film while directing episodes of China Smith. When production was on hiatus, he wrote a story with a colleague. Bernard Tabakin, who produced China Smith, agreed to produce the film along with Aldrich.

Aldrich claimed that the script was almost entirely written by the uncredited Hugo Butler, a blacklisted screenwriter. Aldrich said: "There are optimists in the society, not many left, who thought that someday those guys [on the Hollywood Blacklist] would get post-mortem credits for their work. So he wrote World for Ransom and I put my name on it to try and get him the credit. And it went into arbitration with the Writer's Guild, and another guy, Lindsay Hardy, got total screen credit on it. It was a joke. He no more wrote that script than walk on the water. Butler made that total screenplay."

Filming began on April 13, 1953 at the Motion Picture Center Studio. It was shot over the course of six days, and then Aldrich halted production to shoot television commercials to raise money for the film's post-production. A five-day shoot ensued to finish production. The film's budget was between $90,000 and $100,000.

Aldrich later said that the film "... first embedded what I wanted to say in films. It was mainly about two men with good and bad points. Both men believed in individual liberty but the belief of one man was weaker than the other because he had no respect for humanity."

== Reception ==
In a contemporary review for The New York Times, critic Bosley Crowther wrote: "Set it down as an item booked not beneath its class. Nothing gives it distinction, save possibly the people in its cast. ... Robert Aldrich produced and directed. He was trying. Some day he may learn how."

Reviewer Wanda Hale of the New York Daily News called the film "a tight thriller" and wrote: "'World for Ransom' sustains suspense and the cast ... all give the star first rate support."
