= Noelle Middleton =

Irish actress (1926–2016)

- Born: Evelyn Noelle Middleton; 18 December 1926; Sligo, Ireland
- Died: 30 January 2016 (aged 89); Strandhill, Ireland
- Other names: Evelyn Woodeson
- Education: Trinity College Dublin
- Occupations: Actress, announcer

Evelyn Noelle Woodeson (née Middleton; 18 December 1926 – 30 January 2016) was an Irish actress and one of the first BBC television announcers. She was also a leading lady of the 1950s British films.

Middleton received a BAFTA Film Award nomination for her leading role in Carrington V.C. (1954). Her other notable film roles were in Happy Ever After (1954), John and Julie (1955), The Iron Petticoat (1956), and Three Men in a Boat (1956).

== Biography ==
Middleton was the daughter of Lillian (née Martin) and Wilbram or Willbraham Middleton. She has a brother, Gerald (91)who has lived in Sydney Australia with his wife Zoe since the late 1960’s. Her cousin Ian Doyle (89) still resides in Sligo. She attended Trinity College, Dublin, but left and began her career on the stage at the famous Gate Theatre in Dublin. In the 1950s she moved to London and began appearing in British films. She was also an announcer on the BBC.

Her first film was South of Algiers in 1953. Other films include Carrington V.C. with David Niven and The Iron Petticoat with Katharine Hepburn and Bob Hope. She was nominated for a BAFTA Film Award for Best Actress in 1955 for her performance in Carrington V.C.. She was a founding member of Irish Actors' Equity.

She retired and returned to County Sligo to run an oyster farm at Culleenamore Bay. Noelle died on 30 January 2016 at Summerville Nursing Home, Strandhill, County Sligo aged 89. Her home sadly left the family and was sold to others after her death. There was a stone seat with a memorial plaque created on her death by her 2nd cousin Steven Doyle at her cottage.

== Filmography ==
List of acting performances in film and television
Year	Title	Role	Note
1953	South of Algiers	Stewardess	
1954	Happy Ever After	Kathy McGluskey	
1954	Buried Treasure	Herself	TV series (1 episode)
1955	Carrington V.C.	Captain Alison L. Graham	
1955	John and Julie	Miss Stokes	
1955	St. Ives	Flora Gilchrist	TV series (6 episodes)
1955	A Yank in Ermine	Angela	
1956	The Iron Petticoat	Lady Connie Warburton-Watts	
1956	Three Men in a Boat	Ethelbertha	
1956	You Can't Escape	Kay March	
1957	The Vicious Circle	Laura James	
1958	Sword of Freedom	Adriana	TV series (1 episode)
1961	A Question of Suspense	Rose Marple	
1961	Sir Francis Drake	Mary Queen of Scots	TV series (1 episode)
1962	Man of the World	Mother Superior / Fiona	TV series (2 episodes)

== Awards and nominations ==
Year	Award	Category	Nominated work	Result
1955	8th British Academy Film Awards	Best British Actress	Carrington V.C.	Nominated
