= The Night Has Eyes (novel) =

1939 novel

- Author: Alan Kennington
- Language: English
- Genre: Mystery
- Publisher: Jarrolds
- Publication date: 1939
- Media type: Print

The Night Has Eyes is a 1939 mystery thriller novel by the British writer Alan Kennington. On the Yorkshire Moors a schoolteacher meets and become attracted to a distinctly odd young man living in isolation from the world.

== Film adaptation ==
In 1942 it was made into a British film of the same title directed by Leslie Arliss and starring James Mason and Joyce Howard.

== Bibliography ==
- Goble, Alan. The Complete Index to Literary Sources in Film. Walter de Gruyter, 1999.
- McFarlane, Brian . Four from the forties: Arliss, Crabtree, Knowles and Huntington. Manchester University Press, 2018.
