= Sir Francis Drake (TV series) =

British television adventure series (1961–1962)

- Also known as: The Adventures of Sir Francis Drake
- Genre: Adventure
- Directed by: Clive Donner; Harry Booth (1961)
- Starring: Terence Morgan
- Theme music composer: Ivor Slaney
- Composer: Ivor Slaney
- Country of origin: United Kingdom
- Original language: English
- No. of seasons: 1
- No. of episodes: 26 (list of episodes)

Production
- Executive producer: Leslie Harris
- Producer: Anthony Bushell
- Cinematography: Brendan J. Stafford; Jack Mills
- Running time: 25 Mins
- Production company: Incorporated Television Company

Original release
- Network: ITV
- Release: 12 November 1961 – 20 May 1962

Sir Francis Drake (aka The Adventures of Sir Francis Drake) is a 1961–1962 British adventure television series starring Terence Morgan as Sir Francis Drake, commander of the sailing ship the Golden Hind. As well as battles at sea and sword fights, the series also deals with intrigue at Queen Elizabeth's court.

== Production ==
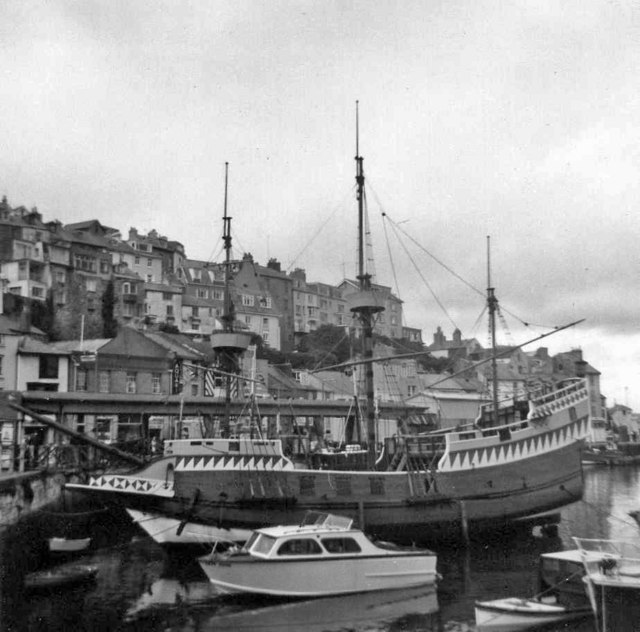
Ship used in the TV series moored in Brixham harbour in 1968

The series was a joint ABC/ATV production, made at Associated British Elstree Studios and on historical sites in England.

A replica of the Golden Hind was constructed at a cost of £25,000 and was used for filming in and around the bays of Torbay and Dartmouth. In 1963 the ship was permanently moored in Brixham harbour in Devon where it became a tourist attraction. The ship was wrecked in a storm in 1987, after which it was towed to Dartmouth and replaced with the current replica.

=== Additional production staff ===
Historical research was provided by E. Hayter Preston. Beatrice Dawson designed the many period costumes worn in the show. Ian Stuart Black was story editor. The fight scenes were arranged by Peter Diamond, who also appeared in four episodes.

== Broadcast history ==
The series was originally shown on UK network ATV from 12 November 1961, until 20 May 1962. It later aired in the US on NBC from 24 June 1962, to 9 September 1962 as a summer replacement for Car 54, Where Are You?. In 2020, it began being broadcast on Talking Pictures TV.

== Cast and characters ==
- Terence Morgan as Sir Francis Drake
- Jean Kent as Queen Elizabeth I
- Michael Crawford as John Drake
- Roger Delgado as Count Bernardino de Mendoza
- Patrick McLoughlin as Trevelyan
- Alex Scott as Don Pedro
- Milton Reid as Diego
- Richard Warner as Walsingham
- Ewan Roberts as Munro
- Howard Lang as Richard Grenville
- Glynn Edwards as Will Martin
- Peter Diamond as Bosun

== Guest appearances ==
- David McCallum as Lord Oakeshott
- Delphi Lawrence as the Countess
- Raymond Huntley as Dr John Dee
- Noelle Middleton as Mary Queen of Scots
- Michael Anderson Jr. as John Harington
- Clive Morton as English Ambassador
- Ronald Leigh-Hunt as Hawkins
- Nanette Newman as Yana
- Olive McFarland as Jenny Smellitt
- Michael Ripper as Almighty Jones
- Mark Eden as Agila
- Anthony Bushell as Tom Doughty
- Frederick Jaeger as Vicary
- William Lucas as Count Julio
- Neil McCallum as Sir Martin
- Francesca Annis as Mariella of Naples
- Ferdy Mayne as Joos
- Mary Merrall as Duchess
- Nigel Davenport as Miguel de Cervantes
- Reginald Beckwith as Sir Henry Rainsford
- Brian Bedford as Estaban
- Barry Morse as Governor
- Pamela Brown as Catherine de' Medici
- Patrick Allen as Henry of Navarre
- Natasha Parry as Countess Inez

== Episode list ==
Airdate is for ATV London ITV regions varied date and order.

No.	Title	Directed by	Written by	Original release date
1	"The Prisoner"	Peter Maxwell	Ian Stuart Black	12 November 1961
The Golden Hind sinks a Spanish ship and prisoners are bought aboard. Among them Countess Inez (Natasha Parry) who plans to repay Drake's kindnesses by sinking his ship using a long fuse made by Roberto (Warren Mitchell) from her cabin to the ship's gunpowder stored below. Drake evacuates his ship as time for its sinking comes close, staying on board with the Countess. Also starred Clifford Elkin as Don Antonio.
2	"The Lost Colony of Virginia"	David Greene	Larry Forester	19 November 1961
Drake pleads the case of the Virginia colony to Elizabeth against Daniel Peters (Charles Lloyd-Pack) who only wants any gold found and wants the colony shut down, and Walsingham (Richard Warner). We see Mendoza (who is the Spanish Ambassador to the court) for the first time. They discover a stowaway aboard on the way to Virginia, (Olive McFarland) who they take to her husband to be Tom Brewster (Barry Foster). The colonists leave as they have had enough of Indian attacks and bad supplies. Also starred Glynn Edwards as Martin Armstrong, Fred Johnson as Parson Main, Ruth Lodge as Mistress Seaton, John Walsh as Governor Walters and William Peacock as Lambert
3	"Queen of Scots"	David Greene	Lindsay Galloway	26 November 1961
Elizabeth is worried about Mary, Queen of Scots (who she eventually had executed) (played by Noelle Middleton). Walsingham decides it is time to get Mary out of the way and has his henchman, Thomas Phillips (Harvey Hall) forge a letter from her to make it look like she wants Elizabeth dead. Drake is sent to check on this but is imprisoned by her captor, Sir Amyas Paulet (Alfred Burke) who is in on the plot too. Also starred Reginald Jessup as Sergeant.
4	"Doctor Dee"	Clive Donner	Doreen Montgomery	3 December 1961
Doctor Dee (Raymond Huntley) entertains Elizabeth and her court with some magic tricks. Mendoza's man, Don Pedro steals all Dee's papers and he is forced to make a false astrology chart so the superstitious Queen refuses to allow Drake to sail to Ostend where some Spanish ships are holed up and rescue some English prisoners on them as well as liberating the captured cargo. Drake has to get the papers back for Dee before he can sail. The episode also stars Michael Golden as Rafe and Edward Cast as captain of the Guard and Michael Crawford sings "Greensleeves".
5	"Bold Enterprise"	Anthony Bushell and Harry Booth	John Roddick	10 December 1961
Drake tries to persuade Elizabeth to let him raid Santo Domingo (now capital of the island, Dominican Republic) where the fort is not yet fully armed and is loaded with gold. Elizabeth refuses, as she does not want to upset Spain. Meanwhile, her emissary, Lord Westbrook (Patrick Holt) is imprisoned at the fort. Drake decides to bring in Sir Richard Bosanquet (Richard Pearson) banker, to finance a mission behind Elizabeth's back, to Santo Domingo knowing that if he succeeds, Elizabeth will forgive him but if he fails, she will behead him. The episode also stars Michael Peake as the (Spanish) Governor, Leon Peers as Eastwood, Joanne Dainton as Laura and Peter Diamond as Bosun.
6	"The English Dragon"	Clive Donner	Ian Stuart Black	17 December 1961
A favourite of the Queen and a young fool, Lord Oakeshott (played by a bearded David McCallum) turns into an even worse lovesick young fool. Held by a Countess (Delphi Lawrence) in a prison in Calais, Ambassador Mendoza in his slimy way threatens the Queen that King Phillip will have the French execute Oakeshott unless Drake (or "El Drako", the English Dragon of the title) is hung. It is up to Drake to release Oakeshott, despite Mendoza and Oakeshott's efforts to stop him doing so. The episode also stars Henry Vidon as The Prefect and Howard Lang as Grenville. As Grenville certainly looked the part as Drake's second in command he became a permanent character in the show.
7	"Boy Jack"	Clive Donner	Cedric Wallis and Ian Stuart Black, story by Cedric Wallis	24 December 1961
Elizabeth sends her godson, Jack Harrington (Michael Anderson Jr.) on a mission as an emissary to deliver a message to an ambassador in Portugal (Clive Morton) not knowing that the Spanish have just invaded Portugal. Drake and Jack find themselves in a tavern full of Spanish soldiers where the ambassador is held captive. There was a point early in the story where it was shown that the ship's crew lived on very poor food. In the sword fight near the end, the ship's cook (Victor Maddern) is seen grabbing all the Spanish food he could to take back to the ship. There were two models used to show Royal residences of the time. Also starred John Moffatt as a Spanish Captain, Timothy Pearce as a Spanish soldier, Isobel Black as Sophia and Peter Diamond as Bosun.
8	"The Garrison"	David Greene	Ian Stuart Black	31 December 1961
Drake takes provisions to the 500 men in the Dutch garrison at Blankenberg who are keeping the Spanish at bay. After a disastrous first trip, Drake returns to find out that there are only 13 men (from the original 35) defending the garrison and Sir Miles (Laurence Naismith) has been pocketing the money. The cast includes Patrick Wymark as Captain Williams (of the garrison), Peter Diamond as Bosun, Bill Dancy as Master Gunner, Brian Cant as Corporal, Grodon Gardner as Lacey and Michael Bell as Captain of the Guard.
9	"Visit to Spain"	Terry Bishop	Doreen Montgomery	7 January 1962
King Phillip II (Zia Mohyeddin) 15-year-old son, Carlos (Joseph Cuby) is due to marry Mariella of Naples (Francesca Annis) to ally Italy with Spain. Mariella is a young girl who is horrified with the very nasty brat, Carlos who even his father has contempt for. Help is on hand in the form of Drake who is sent as the Queen's emissary to the wedding. To make sure Drake is safe, the Duke of Cordova (John Arnatt) is a "guest" of Elizabeth in England and Cordova knows many of Phillip's invasion plans for England so Drake is safe in his enemy's hands. However, Cordova has bribed his way free and has now returned to Spain meaning Drake is now in great danger. The episode also stars Bryan Coleman as Ambassador Wenham and Catherine Woodville as daughter Anne/Suzanne.
10	"The Flame Thrower"	Anthony Bushell and Harry Booth	Doreen Montgomery	14 January 1962
Sir Martin Amyas (Neil McCallum), a young inventor has made a flame thrower to clear weeds from gardens but the Queen sees its potential as a weapon of war which can burn the Spanish fleet and orders him to make more flame throwers for English ships. Amyas is an idealist and is horrified that his invention could be used to kill people. That night a friar persuades Amyas to run away but the friar turns out to a Spaniard, Count Julio (William Lucas) who plans to deliver him and his invention to Spain. The episode also stars Richard Huggett as Alonzo and Helen Christie as Lady Amyas.
11	"The Governor's Revenge"	Clive Donner	John Baines	21 January 1962
Roger Delgado as the villain again, but here he is Governor, Don Frederico Martinez di Acuna of Villa Real, King Phillip's viceroy to Santa Marta. He drugs guest John Hawkins (Ronald Leigh-Hunt) and frames him for theft, threatening to cut off his hand and hang him if Drake does not give up the Golden Hind as ransom for his life. However Drake has a plan. The cast also includes Marie Burke as Dona Inez, Maureen Moore as Isabel, Pauline Letts as Dona Clara, John Bennett as Tomas and Will Stampe as Don Gonzalo.
12	"Slaves of Spain"	Harry Booth and Anthony Bushell	Ian Stuart Black	28 January 1962
The Golden Hind is in urgent need of supplies so they put into Tobago where Drake finds that the locals and British prisoners are being used as slave labour to mine gold for Spain. Drake works on a plan to release them unaware that Agila (Mark Eden) plans to betray him to the Spaniards. The cast includes Nanette Newman as Yana, Michael Ripper as Almighty Jones, Derek Sydney as the Spanish Governor and Catherine Finn as his wife, Marshall Jones as Garrett, Dallas Cavell as a Lieutenant and Colin Rix as a prisoner.
13	"The Doughty Plot"	David Greene	Margaret Irwin and David Greene, story by Margaret Irwin	4 February 1962
Producer Anthony Bushell plays Tom Doughty in this episode. Old friend of Drake, Doughty and two other businessmen finance a voyage by Drake to get spices from Egypt. A long way from home, Drake reveals that his real purpose is to sail around Tierra Del Fuego and up the coast of Chile where there will be Spanish treasure ships. The businessmen don't like this and Doughty pushes a number of Drake's men to mutiny against him and take over the ship. The episode also stars Frederick Jaeger as Vicary, Victor Maddern as Brewer, Glynn Edwards as Martin, Bob Grant as Clements, Marshall Jones as Cooper and Rory MacDermot as Fletcher.
14	"King of America"	David Greene	Ian Stuart Black	11 February 1962
John Drake, Sir Francis's nephew, joins Thomas Stukeley's (Kieron Moore) expedition to colonise America. However, the hardships are too much for the small number of colonists and, with the badgering of Richard Flavel (Andrew Keir), the colonists decide to use a captured Spanish ship and head for England leaving Stukeley to fend for himself. The episode also stars Susan Hampshire as Celia, Charles Hill as the Spanish Admiral, Walter Randall as the Spanish Captain and Frederick Rawlings as the Indian Chief. This episode is very loosely based on Thomas Stukeley's failed attempt to set up a colony in Florida in 1563.
15	"The Irish Pirate"	Peter Graham Scott	Donal Giltinian	18 February 1962
Elizabeth orders Drake to capture Irish rebel, Lord O'Neill (Liam Gaffney). On the way, Drake is given Grace O'Malley (Elspeth March), notorious Irish pirate and decides to use her as a swap for O'Neill with her two sons who each rule a rebel party in Ireland. Things do not go as planned and treachery and fighting is the order of the day. This episode also stars Peter Halliday as Theobald Burke.
16	"Beggars of the Sea"	Terry Bishop	Ian Stuart Black	25 February 1962
The Spanish troops in the Netherlands (who they are at war with) near mutiny, as they have not been paid in a long time. Spain is running short on gold so borrow some from merchants in Venice who charge very high rates and they get Elizabeth's promise that the treasure ship will not be plundered by English ships on the way to the Netherlands. Elizabeth knows this money must not arrive to reinforce Spain in Northern Europe so tells Drake that no ENGLISH ship must attack them and Drake notes the emphasis. The episode's title refers to people who use rowing boats to scrounge what they can at sea. Stars William Lucas as Count Julio, Michael Forest as Jan, Gerard Heinz as Alva, Robert Rietti as Captain Riccardo, George Little as a Lieutenant and David Grahame as a banker.
17	"Drake on Trial"	John Lamont	Tudor Gates	4 March 1962
It is said that everyone has a double and so does Drake in the form of Hugh Graveney (also played by Terence Morgan) who uses a sister ship of the Golden Hind to pretend to be Drake so he can scare Spanish ships into surrendering then loot them and kill the people on board. Caught by the Spanish, Mendoza sees this as a chance to blacken Drake's name by having Graveney attack a Dutch ship as Drake (the Dutch are necessary allies as they keep the Spanish busy in the Netherlands so they cannot invade England). Mendoza returns to court and demands Drake be hanged for his murderous attacks on a Spanish and a Dutch ship, supported by a Dutch captain who recognised Drake. The episode also stars Peter Stephens as Counsellor, Arnold Diamond as Governor, Richard Shaw as Captain Vanderhof, David Davies as Sykes, Tom Bowman as a Mate and Stanley Morgan as Lieutenant.
18	"The Bridge"	Terry Bishop	Brian Clemens	11 March 1962
The Spanish invade Portugal May 1580 and imprison the Portuguese leaders in Castle Ortega. Elizabeth asks Drake to release the most important of these, Gazio (Patrick Troughton) so while his ship lies nearby, Drake enters the Spanish fortress alone to secure his release. The cast includes Zena Marshall as Maria, Dennis Edwards as De Vazim, Bill Nagy as Corsia, Anthony Bate as Tilsto, John Ronane as Spanish Officer and Vicki Woolf as a prisoner.
19	"Johnnie Factotum"	Peter Graham Scott	John Keir Cross	18 March 1962
There is a sea battle in which Drake takes treasure from a Spanish ship. He finds out that it is to be stolen so with Diego, he is disguised and goes undercover to find out who wants to steal it. There are more fights, an ambush and Johnny Factotum (Philip Guard) turns out to be William Shakespeare. The episode also stars Katherine Blake as The Dark Lady, Lawrence Davidson as Lord Marmont, Duncan Burns as a boy actor, Barry Shawzin as Chamberlain and Lawrence Taylor as Janitor.
20	"Mission to Paris"	David Greene	Lindsay Galloway and David Greene, story by Lindsay Galloway	25 March 1962
Elizabeth is in love with Alençon, son of Catherine de' Medici (Queen of France) to the horror of her Court. He has to return to France where his mother guesses what is going on and puts him in the Bastille as she does not like the idea of him marrying Elizabeth either. Drake is sent to bring him back to England. The episode also stars Patrick Allen as Navarre, Michael Ripper as Caylus, Peter Diamond as De Luc, Desmond Newling as Rietti, Ryan Jeffs as Martier and Yvonne Buckingham as Heloise.
21	"The Reluctant Duchess"	Terry Bishop	Gordon Wellesley and Paul Tabori	1 April 1962
The Spanish want to invade England overland but the small area of Ravenstein (in Holland) stands in their way. Elizabeth sends Drake to bring the Duchess (Mary Merrall) back to England so the Spanish cannot use her to threaten her people to stop resisting them. Drake joins a group of players run by Joos Maartens (Ferdy Mayne) to accomplish the task. The cast includes Basil Dignam as Duke of Alva, Andrew Faulds as Count Toledo, Susan Burnett as Lady Elena and Kenneth Gilbert as Sergeant.
22	"The Gypsies"	John Lamont	John Baines	8 April 1962
The Golden Hind comes across a rowing boat full of gypsies and takes them aboard. Led by Pastora (Eileen Way who played a number of evil hags), the small group cause trouble on the Golden Hind, even trying to sink it. The episode also stars Sarah Branch as Sara, Harry Lockhart as Rafael, Christopher Carlos as Baltasar, Larry Burns as Obadiah, William Abney as Don Pedro
23	"Court Intrigue"	Terry Bishop	Hugh Ross Williamson	15 April 1962
An English goldsmith (Adam Forrester played by Robin Hughes) with loyalty to Spain gives Elizabeth false information so Drake will not attack a treasure ship necessary to help finance the Spanish Armada. The episode also stars Bernard Archard as Sir Christopher, Ewan Roberts as Munro, John Arnatt as Spanish ambassador, Charles Carson as Spanish admiral, Edward Woodward as Spanish captain, Colin Jeavons as an officer, Michael Mellinger as a servant.
24	"Gentleman of Spain"	John Lamont	John Keir Cross	22 April 1962
Before Europeans started taking slaves from Africa, Africans took slaves from Europe. In such a raid, a relative of Elizabeth and his family are taken from Wales to the slave markets at Tripoli. The Queen sends Drake on the hopeless mission of trying to rescue him but all is not as bad as it seems. Crewman Martin was a slave there for two years before escaping with the help of a Spaniard, Don Miguel Cervantes (Nigel Davenport). Drake finds him still helping slaves and Cervantes talks of writing a book called Don Quixote one day. The episode also stars Paul Stassino as Hassan Bey, Jack Melford as Sir Owen Tudor, Marne Maitland as Uluch Ali, Guy Deghy as Zarque, Kim Tracy as Zaharra, Wavenley Lee as Olwen, and Norman Scace as Stephens.
25	"The Fountain of Youth"	Terry Bishop	Ian Stuart Black	29 April 1962
Drake intercepts a treasure ship and finds the Spanish attach more importance to some barrels of water than they do to the gold on board. This is said to be from the Fountain of youth for King Phillip of Spain. Back in England, Elizabeth tells Drake that Sir Henry Rainsford (Reginald Beckwith) has found out about a new route the Spanish are using to move gold from the new world which is near to Florida. Drake is sent with Rainsford to intercept gold ships and while there he meets red Indians there who are fighting the Spanish who now have a hold in Florida. The cast includes Catherine Woodville as Little Dove and Endre Muller as Black Eagle.
26	"Escape"	David Greene	David Greene	20 May 1962
Drake is held prisoner by a sadistic Governor (Barry Morse) and after a failed escape attempt ends up in front of a firing squad. The cast includes Charles Heslop as Withers, Brian Bedford as Estaban, Barry Keegan as Gomez and Martin Boddey as The Colonel.

== DVD release ==
The complete series is out on DVD and includes a still showing Terence Morgan as Sir Francis Drake playing bowls, alluding to the famous incident when the Spanish Armada was sighted.
