= Alan Kennington (writer) =

British writer (1906–1986)

- Born: 1906; United Kingdom
- Died: 10 November 1986 (aged 79–80); United Kingdom
- Occupation: Novelist

Alan Kennington (1906–1986) was a British novelist and playwright, particularly known for his thrillers. Two of his novels were adapted into films. The 1939 novel The Night Has Eyes was made into a 1942 film of the same title, while She Died Young (1938) was turned into the 1956 film You Can't Escape. His 1949 novel Pastures New was a comedy about American students in post-war Britain.

== Selected works ==
- She Died Young (1938)
- The Night Has Eyes (1939)
- Flying Visitor (1946)
- Pastures New (1949)
- Blood Velvet (1954)

== Bibliography ==
- Curthoys, Ann & Lake, Marilyn. Connected Worlds: History in Transnational Perspective. ANU E Press, 2006.
- Goble, Alan. The Complete Index to Literary Sources in Film. Walter de Gruyter, 1999.
- Wearing, J.P. The London Stage 1930-1939: A Calendar of Productions, Performers, and Personnel. Rowman & Littlefield, 2014.
