= Felix Warden Brown =

British psychiatrist

- Born: 10 April 1908; Heaton Chapel, Lancashire, England
- Died: 10 June 1972 (aged 64)
- Scientific career
- Fields: Psychiatry
- Workplaces: Guy's Hospital; Charing Cross Hospital; Royal Free Hospital

Felix Warden Brown (10 April 1908–10 June 1972) was a British psychiatrist specialising in child, family and adolescent psychiatry.

== Biography ==
Born in Heaton Chapel, Lancashire, on 10 June 1908, Felix Warden Brown was educated at Bedford School, at Keble College, Oxford, at the Royal London Hospital, where he qualified in Medicine in 1932, and at Johns Hopkins University, where he trained in psychiatry under Adolf Meyer. He began working at Guy's Hospital in 1936, and subsequently worked at the Charing Cross Hospital, before becoming Consultant Physician at the Royal Free Hospital. He was elected as a Fellow of the Royal College of Physicians in 1968.

Brown was married to the actress Eileen Way. He died on 10 June 1972.
