= John and Julie =

1955 film

- Film poster
- Directed by: William Fairchild
- Written by: William Fairchild
- Produced by: Herbert Mason
- Starring: Colin Gibson; Lesley Dudley; Noelle Middleton; Moira Lister
- Cinematography: Arthur Grant
- Edited by: Bernard Gribble
- Music by: Philip Green
- Production company: Group 3 Films
- Distributed by: British Lion Films (UK)
- Release dates: 26 July 1955 (UK); August 1957 (USA)
- Running time: 82 min.
- Country: United Kingdom
- Language: English
- Box office: £154,494 (UK)

John and Julie is a 1955 British comedy film written and directed by William Fairchild and starring Colin Gibson, Lesley Dudley, Noelle Middleton and Moira Lister, and featuring Peter Sellers and Sid James in early screen roles. It was produced by Group 3 Films and distributed by British Lion Films and also marked the film debut of Valerie Buckley.

In 1953, two children are determined to see the Queen and decide to make their way to London.

== Plot ==
The film is set in 1953 in the week leading up to the coronation of Queen Elizabeth II.

John and Julie are two young children from Dorset who are eager to see the Coronation of Elizabeth II despite the fact that their respective parents have no intention of going. When the two are left alone, they decide to run off to London to see John's "Uncle Ben" who is in the Life Guards and therefore "knows the queen".

They steal a horse and take it to the railway station where they buy two tickets to London, but John loses his ticket. Julie gets off the train too and joins a group of Brownies on their chartered bus to London, but John is not allowed on because he is a boy. He steals a bike to follow the bus, leaving an apology note. Julie asks the bus driver to stop to go to the toilet but is actually trying to feed John.

Finally arriving in London, they get separated in a huge crowd. Julie is taken under the wing of a well-dressed street girl before the two protagonists are reunited in Trafalgar Square.

At the end of the film, all the individuals who were part of the story appear in the crowd watching the Queen's procession.

== Cast ==
- Colin Gibson as John Pritchett
- Lesley Dudley as Julie
- Noelle Middleton as Miss Stokes
- Moira Lister as Dora
- Wilfrid Hyde-White as Sir James, a Field Marshal in the Life Guards
- Sid James as Arthur Pritchett, John's father
- Megs Jenkins as Mrs Pritchett, John's mother
- Joseph Tomelty as Mr Davidson, a judge on holiday from America
- Constance Cummings as Mrs Davidson, his wife
- Patric Doonan as Jim Webber, a bicycle shop owner
- Andrew Cruickshank as Uncle Ben, a Corporal of Horse in the Life Guards
- Peter Coke as captain in the Life Guards
- Colin Gordon as Mr Swayne, a boys' group leader
- Winifred Shotter as Mrs Swayne, his wife
- Peter Jones as Jeremy
- Vincent Ball as Digger
- Peter Sellers as Police Constable Diamond
- Patrick Connor as Trooper Rogers
- Philip Stainton as a London police sergeant
- Mona Washbourne as Miss Rendlesham
- Molly Weir as Landlady
- Katie Johnson as woman in street

Frazer Hines who later became known for his portrayal of Jamie McCrimmon in Doctor Who had a minor role.

== Production ==
Filming took place at Beaconsfield Studios. It is interspersed with footage from the day of the coronation.

== Release ==
John and Julie was released to cinemas in the United Kingdom on 26 July 1955, over two years after the Coronation of Elizabeth II. The film represented Britain at the 1955 Venice Film Festival.

== Reception ==
=== Critical ===
Variety called it an "entertaining, lightweight story."

The Monthly Film Bulletin wrote: "This film, which is eminently suitable for juvenile audiences, manages to include most of the stock comic/sentimental situations peculiar to the British cinema and is played by a large array of veteran character actors. Its strong patriotic theme also suggests that hardly anything of importance had occurred in the lives of anyone concerned until the Coronation came along. William Fairchild, making his directorial debut, successfully evokes the warm and cosy atmosphere of good clean fun synonymous with stories dealing with the British middle and working classes, and one has little alternative but to succumb to the syrupy, oldfashioned charm of it all."

In September 1956, Maclean's film reviewer, Clyde Gilmour described the film as, "A predictable little comedy-adventure, good fun for most youngsters and bolstered by newsreel shots of the actual event."

Halliwell's Film Video & DVD Guide describes the film as, "Genial little family comedy full of stock comic characters."

=== Box office ===
According to the National Film Finance Corporation, the film made a comfortable profit. According to Kinematograph Weekly it was a "money maker" at the British box office in 1955.

== Home media ==
In 2007, John and Julie was released on DVD as part of the Long Lost Comedy Classics collection.

== Notes ==
- MacCann, Richard Dyer (July 1977). "Subsidy for the Screen Grierson and Group 3". Sight and Sound. pp. 168–173.
- Walker, John. (ed). (2004). Halliwell's Film Video & DVD Guide. HarperCollins Entertainment. 19th edition
