= The Night Has Eyes =

- 1949 US re-release film poster
- Directed by: Leslie Arliss
- Written by: Leslie Arliss; John Argyle
- Based on: The Night Has Eyes by Alan Kennington
- Produced by: John Argyle
- Starring: James Mason; Joyce Howard
- Cinematography: Günther Krampf
- Edited by: Flora Newton
- Music by: Charles Williams
- Distributed by: Pathé Pictures International
- Release date: 1 June 1942
- Running time: 79 minutes
- Country: United Kingdom
- Language: English
- Budget: £15,000

The Night Has Eyes, released in the United States as Terror House by Producers Releasing Corporation and re-released in the US by Cosmopolitan Pictures in 1949 as Moonlight Madness, is a 1942 British thriller film directed by Leslie Arliss starring James Mason, Joyce Howard, Wilfrid Lawson, Mary Clare and Tucker McGuire. It was written by Arliss and John Argyle based on the 1939 novel of the same title by Alan Kennington.

== Plot ==
Two young female teachers travel to the Yorkshire Moors where their friend had disappeared a year before, and it is not long before they encounter a man they believe to be her murderer. That night, a violent storm breaks out, and they become stranded in the house where they are staying.

== Cast ==
- James Mason as Stephen Deremid
- Wilfrid Lawson as Jim Sturrock
- Joyce Howard as Marian Ives
- Mary Clare as Mrs. Ranger
- Tucker McGuire as Doris
- John Fernald as Doctor Barry Randall
- Dorothy Black as Miss Fenwick
- Amy Dalby as Miss Miggs

== Critical reception ==
The Monthly Film Bulletin wrote: "The dIrection and production of this film are too stagey to get the most out of quite a good plot. James Mason and Joyce Howard do their best as the hero and heroine. The best performance is undoubtedly that of Wilfrid Lawson as Mrs. Ranger's thoroughly Yorkshire husband."

Kine Weekly wrote: "The story takes some time to get down to brass tacks; there is a tendency to be arty and overstress the mental eccentricities of the hero, but once the gaff is blown and it is clear that the unhappy fellow has been framed, things begin to hum. In other words, the impetus given by the unexpected carries the story through a hectic maze of thrills to a grim, but morally secure, climax. It is an obvious, if grisly, winner from the straight."

Picturegoer wrote: "There is something intrinsically phoney about this psychological thriller which handicaps it from the start. ... James Mason is quite good as the ex-officer who believes he is a killer and Mary Clare is disarming as the housekeeper. Wilfrid Lawson is apt to overact as the handyman."

Picture Show wrote: "Unusual, grim thriller ... Although it is rather too arty and slow at first, the film picks up later on, and moves to a really horrifying climax."

Leonard Maltin called the film an "OK mystery."

TV Guide wrote "though melodramatic and soundstage-bound, Terror House is still quite effective and eerie. Fog covers almost every exterior; cinematographer Gunther Krampf spent long periods getting the artificial fog at just the right density... The final film was almost too effective, and after initially getting an A rating from the British censor and being booked on the biggest cinema circuit in Britain, the rating was suddenly changed to H (for "Horrific"), making it off-limits for anyone under 16 years of age. The big circuits had a policy of showing only A films, so the independent cinemas became the big winners, getting an excellent thriller starring Mason, Britain's top leading man at the time."
