= You Can't Escape =

1956 British film by Wilfred Eades

- U.S. poster
- Directed by: Wilfred Eades
- Written by: Robert Hall; Doreen Montgomery
- Based on: She Died Young by Alan Kennington
- Produced by: Robert Hall
- Starring: Noelle Middleton; Guy Rolfe; Robert Urquhart; Peter Reynolds
- Cinematography: Norman Warwick
- Edited by: E.B. Jarvis
- Music by: Charles Williams
- Production company: Forth Films
- Distributed by: Associated British-Pathé
- Release date: 20 February 1956
- Running time: 77 minutes
- Country: United Kingdom
- Language: English

You Can't Escape is a 1956 British second feature ('B') drama film directed by Wilfred Eades and starring Noelle Middleton, Guy Rolfe and Robert Urquhart. It was written by Robert Hall and Doreen Montgomery based on the 1938 novel She Died Young by Alan Kennington.

== Plot ==
Rising novelist, Peter Darwin, has a row with former mistress Claire, and accidentally kills her. He somehow manages to persuades his reluctant fiancé Kay to help him bury Claire's body in a wood. But when the body is found, and a blackmailing journalist appears on the scene, Darwin resorts to desperate measures to cover his tracks, including framing an innocent person.

== Cast ==
- Noelle Middleton as Kay March
- Guy Rolfe as David Anstruther
- Robert Urquhart as Peter Darwin
- Peter Reynolds as Rodney Nixon
- Elizabeth Kentish as Claire Segar
- Barbara Cavan as Aunt Sue
- Martin Boddey as Inspector Crane
- Thorley Walters as Chadwick
- Jacqueline Mackenzie as Mrs. Baggerley
- Thorley Walters as Chadwick
- Wensley Pithey as Constable Wagstaff
- Edward Forsyth as Colonel Tripp
- Barbara Leake as Mrs. Trussler
- Sam Kydd as Ted, Poacher
- Hal Osmond as Poacher's Friend
- Victor Platt as Darts Player
- Arthur Gross as Bystander
- Noel Coleman as Official
- Robert Cawdron as Pugilist
- Maureen Connell as 1st Peasant Blouse
- Sally Bazely as 2nd Peasant Blouse
- Alec Finter as Foreman of The Jury

== Release ==
It was released as an 'A' certificate. Though filmed in 1.33:1, it was also framed in 1.66:1 for any theatre that had the equipment to exhibit widescreen films.

== Critical reception ==
The Monthly Film Bulletin wrote: "A stereotyped murder melodrama, which ambles unexcitingly towards a conclusion that the spectator has anticipated long before the film reaches that far. Playing and direction are somewhat lifeless."

TV Guide concluded there was "Nothing much to get excited about."

In British Sound Films: The Studio Years 1928–1959 David Quinlan rated the film as "poor", writing: "Very lacklustre thriller."

My Reviewer found the film "full of action from the off and whilst it all feels a little dated now, it has a certain old school charm – like the very best of ITC shows from back in the day."

Blueprint Review wrote, "Despite its rather stagey tone You Can’t Escape remains a fun example of British B-movies from that era."
