= Harry Booth (filmmaker) =

English film director, film producer, screenwriter and editor

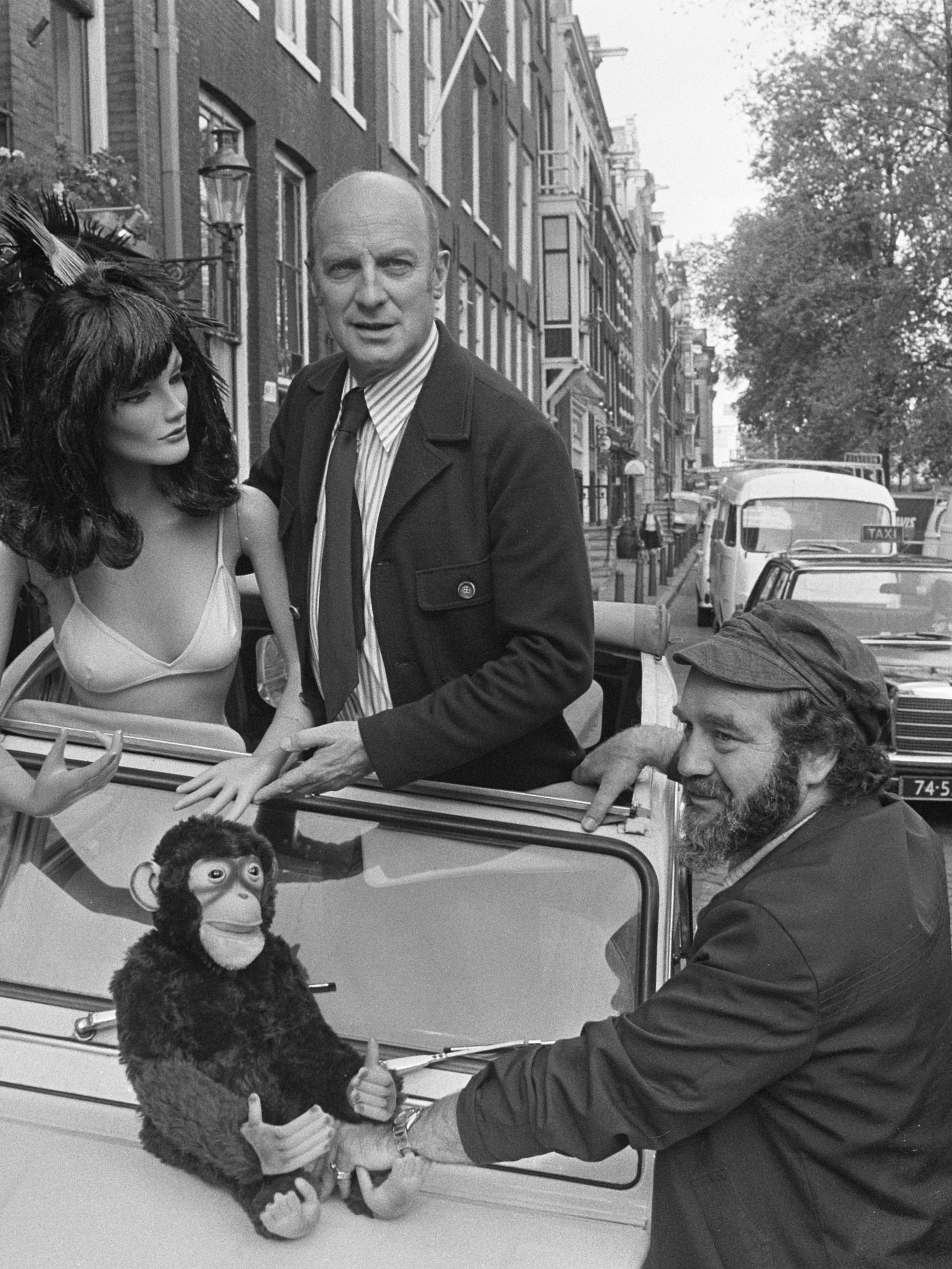
Booth (right) with Wim Sonneveld while shooting Op de Hollandse toer

Harry Booth (born in London) is an English film director, film producer, screenwriter and editor. He began his film career in 1941.

He debuted as a director with the war documentary Blitz on Britain (1960). His subsequent films include A King's Story (1965), which was nominated for an Academy Award.

Booth's work on television includes directing 14 episodes of Here Come the Double Deckers (1970-1971), a children's series.

== Filmography ==
=== Director ===
- Ben Hall TV series (unknown episodes; 1975)
- Op de Hollandse toer – English title Going Dutch (1973)
- The Flying Sorcerer (1973)
- The Protectors (1 TV episode; 1973)
- Go for a Take – U.S. title Double Take (also credited as writer; 1972)
- Mutiny on the Buses (1972)
- On the Buses (1971)
- Here Come the Double Deckers (14 TV episodes; 1970–1971)
- River Rivals (1967)
- A King's Story (1965)
- The Sentimental Agent (1 TV episode; 1963)
- Man of the World (5 TV episodes; 1962–1963)
- The Adventures of Sir Francis Drake (3 TV episodes; 1961)

=== Editorial department ===
- Rockshow assistant editor (1980)
- The Avengers post-production coordinator (12 TV episodes; 1968–1969)
- Visit to Spain supervising editor (TV episode; 1962)

=== Sound department ===
- Robin Hood: The Movie dubbing editor (video; 1991)

=== Writer ===
- At the Stroke of Nine (1957)
- The Case of the Mukkinese Battle Horn (1956)

=== Editor ===
- Crosstrap (1962)
- Blitz on Britain (1960)
- Penny Points to Paradise (1951)

=== Composer ===
- International Detective TV series (unknown episodes; 1959)
