= Eileen Way =

English actress (1911–1994)

- Born: Eileen Mabel Elizabeth Way; 2 September 1911; New Malden, Surrey, England
- Died: 16 June 1994 (aged 82); Canterbury, Kent, England
- Occupation: Actress
- Years active: 1938–93
- Spouse: Felix Warden Brown

Eileen Mabel Elizabeth Way (2 September 1911 – 16 June 1994) was a British actress who appeared in film and television roles in a career dating back to the 1930s. She trained at the Royal Academy of Dramatic Art from the age of 16.

She was in some of the first productions of Tennessee Williams' plays in Great Britain, including playing the role of the Mexican Woman in A Streetcar Named Desire, and appeared at the Bristol Old Vic and Nottingham Playhouse.

She appeared in a televised episode of Hancock's Half Hour, The Reunion Party ', as a puritanical former ATS member, the TV series Doctor Who, in the serials An Unearthly Child (as Old Mother, the programme's first on-screen death) and The Creature from the Pit (as Karela), as well as in the 1966 film Daleks' Invasion Earth 2150 A.D. (as Old Woman), based on the serial The Dalek Invasion of Earth (1964). She also appeared in the second series of Poldark (1977) as Aunt Agatha; Century Falls; Upstairs, Downstairs; By the Sword Divided; Inspector Morse; Bergerac; and Ripping Yarns.

She was married to the psychiatrist Felix Warden Brown.

== Filmography ==
=== Film ===
Year	Title	Role	Notes
1951	Cheer the Brave	2nd woman	
1952	The Happy Family	Mrs. Potter	
1952	The Stranger Left No Card	Secretary	
1952	Venetian Bird	Woman Detective	
1953	Street of Shadows	Mrs. Thoms	
1953	Blood Orange	Mme. Fernande	
1954	They Who Dare	Greek Woman	
1954	Knave of Hearts	1st Landlady	Uncredited
1954	Aunt Clara	Maggie Mason	
1955	On the Twelfth Day…	Milkmaid	Uncredited
1957	Bullet from the Past	Lady at No. 72	Uncredited
1957	Fortune is a Woman	Mrs. Litchen's housekeeper	
1958	The Vikings	Kitala	
1960	Kidnapped	Jennet Clouston	
1961	The Singer Not the Song	Fortune teller	Uncredited
1962	Village of Daughters	Gloria Balbino	
1964	The Bargee	Onlooker	Uncredited
1964	The Comedy Man	Landlady	
1966	Daleks' Invasion Earth 2150 A.D.	Old Woman	
1966	Drop Dead Darling	Italian Dressmaker	
1969	Vendetta for the Saint	The Maid	
1981	Sphinx	Aida	
1984	Memed My Hawk	Seuneh	
1985	Bad Medicine	Sra. Madera	
1989	Queen of Hearts	Mama Sibilla	

=== Television ===
Year	Title	Episode(s)	Role	Network	Archive status
1938	The Gay Lord Quex	TV Movie	Unknown	BBC Television Service	Missing
1939	The Day is Gone	TV Movie	Florrie	BBC Television Service	Missing
1947	The Gay Lord Quex	TV Movie	Miss. Moon	BBC Television Service	Missing
1952	BBC Sunday-Night Theatre	Series 4, Episode 4: The Gay Lord Quex	Miss. Moon	BBC Television Service	Missing
1955	Music and Macaroni	Episodes 1-2, 5-6	Grandmother	BBC Television Service	Missing
1955	BBC Sunday-Night Theatre	Series 6, Episode 16: Midsummer Fire	La Cachiporra	BBC Television Service	Missing
1955	Thunder Rock	TV Movie	Ellen Kirby	BBC Television Service	Missing
1955	The Blakes	Episode 1	Gypsy Rebecca	BBC Television Service	Missing
1955	Barbie	Episodes 2-3	Miss McGinty	BBC Television Service	Missing
1956	Nom-de-Plume	Episode 9: The Ten Strangers	Mme. Felix	BBC Television Service	Missing
1956	BBC Sunday-Night Theatre	Series 7, Episode 34: Siding 723	Jadwiga Konska	BBC Television Service	Missing
1956	Armchair Theatre	Series 1, Episode 11: The Right Thing	Unknown	ITV (ABC)	Missing
1957	ITV Television Playhouse	Series 2, Episode 24: The Affair at Assino	Tina	ITV	Missing
1957	The Coelacanth	TV Movie	Nicko's mother	BBC Television Service	Missing
1957	BBC Sunday-Night Theatre	Series 8, Episode 49: Counsellor at Law	Sarah Becker	BBC Television Service	Missing
1958	Television World Theatre	Series 1, Episode 3: Women of Troy	Woman of Troy	BBC Television Service	Partial (18 minute excerpt survives)
1958	General Electric Theater	Series 6, Episode 15: Time to Go Now	Old maid	CBS	Unknown
1958	BBC Sunday-Night Theatre	Series 9, Episode 32: The Shadow of Doubt	Gladys Gibson	BBC Television Service	Missing
1958	ITV Television Playhouse	Series 4, Episode 10: Breakdown	Susan	ITV	Exists
1959	The Adventures of William Tell	Series 1, Episode 32: The Black Brothers	Granny Rossi	ITV (ITC)	Exists
1959	The Vagrant Heart	TV Movie	Mrs. Smith	BBC Television Service	Missing
1960	International Detective	Series 1, Episode 5: The Winthrop Case	Mama Carlucci	ITV (ABPC)	Exists
1960	Hancock's Half Hour	Series 6, Episode 4: The Reunion Party	Mavis Smith	BBC Television Service	Exists
1960	BBC Sunday-Night Play	Series 1, Episode 15: Glorious Morning	Ruth Kellner	BBC Television Service	Missing
1960	BBC Sunday-Night Play	Series 1, Episode 27: A Town Has Turned to Dust	Senora Rivera	BBC Television Service	Missing
1960	BBC Sunday-Night Play	Series 1, Episode 34: The Liberators	Mama Valbella	BBC Television Service	Missing
1960	Rendezvous	Series 1, Episode 18: Next Time You'll See Venice	Signora Zampino	ITV (Rediffusion)	Exists
1960	Theatre 70	Series 1, Episode 14: To Death With Love	Marie Albert	ITV (ATV)	Missing
1961	Rashomon	TV Movie	The medium	BBC Television	Exists
1961	The Charlie Drake Show	Series 2, Episode 2: Charlie the Kid	Unknown	BBC Television	Exists
1961	One Step Beyond	Series 3, Episode 27: The Confession	Mrs. Evans	ABC	Exists
1961	Dixon of Dock Green	Series 8, Episode 7: Desperation	Isa Capon	BBC Television	Missing
1962	Sir Francis Drake	Series 1, Episode 22: The Gypsies	Pastora	ITV (ITC)	Exists
1962	Benny Hill	Series 2, Episode 1: The Mystery of Black Bog Manor	Lorna	BBC Television	Exists
1963	Compact	Episode 126	Violet	BBC Television	Missing
1963	Crane	Series 1, Episode 5: The Executioners	Unknown	ITV (Rediffusion)	Missing
1963	Man of the World	Series 2, Episode 6: The Bullfighter	Catrina	ITV (ATV)	Exists
1963	Moonstrike	Series 1, Episode 21: A Matter of Trust	Helene	BBC Television	Missing
1963	Drama '63	Series 3, Episode 14: Rasputin Was a Nice Old Man	Landlady	BBC Television	Missing
1963	Maupassant	Series 1, Episode 10: Bachelors	Mme. Padoie	ITV (Granada)	Exists
1963	Maigret	Series 4, Episode 3: The Lost Life	Irene	BBC Television	Exists
1963	The Sentimenal Agent	Series 1, Episode 7: A Little Sweetness and Light	Miss Mithras	ITV (ITC)	Exists
1963	Kidnapped	Episode 7: Catriona	Jennet Clouston	BBC Television	Missing
1963	Doctor Who	Series 1: An Uneartly Child (2 episodes)	Old woman	BBC Television	Exists
1964	ITV Play of the Week	Series 9, Episode 23: Camino Real	La Madrecita	ITV (Granada)	Missing
1964	First Night	Series 1, Episode 30: How Many Angels	Mrs. Phillips	BBC Television	Missing
1964	The Graham Stark Show	Series 1, Episode 7	Unknown	BBC One	Missing
1964	The Larkins	Series 6, Episode 3: Gypsy's Warning	Gypsy	ITV (ATV)	Exists
1964	Cluff	Series 1, Episode 5: The Daughter-in-law	Mrs. Bateson	BBC One	Missing
1965	Cluff	Series 2, Episode 9: The Daughters	Amy Horrisey	BBC One	Exists
1965	Mogul	Series 1, Episode 9: A Job for Willy	Mrs. Murtagh	BBC One	Missing
1965	Court Martial	Series 1, Episode 4: No Wreath for an Angel	Madame Cornelis	ITV (ITC)	Exists
1966	Court Martial	Series 1, Episode 10: Where There Was No Echo	Woman	ITV (ITC)	Exists
1966	The Wednesday Play	Series 4, Episode 4: Calf Love	Aunt Erika	BBC One	Exists
1966	The Wednesday Play	Series 4, Episode 22: The Executioner	Marguerite Rosmer	BBC One	Missing
1966	The Newcomers	29 episodes	Cora Brassett	BBC One	Missing
1967	Comedy Playhouse	Series 6, Episode 4: Heirs on a Shoestring	Mrs. Jibbet	BBC One	Audio recording survives
1967	Mickey Dunne	Series 1, Episode 13: Are There Any More at Home Like You	Sophia Lombardi	BBC One	Missing
1967	Z-Cars	Series 6, Episode 49: The Great Art Robbery, Pt. 1	Mrs. Hancock	BBC One	Exists
1967	The Troubleshooters	Series 4, Episode 11: Who Buys Who?	Saroya	BBC One	Missing
1968	The Spanish Farm	Episodes 1, 3 and 4	Berthe	BBC Two	Partial (Episode 4 survives)
1968	ITV Playhouse	Series 2, Episode 9: The Kindness of Mrs Radcliffe	Gypsy woman	ITV	Missing
1969	The Saint	Series 6, Episodes 15-16: Vendetta for the Saint, Pts.1 & 2	The maid	ITV (ITC)	Exists
1969	Omnibus	Series 2, Episode 16: The Woman from the Shadows	Old Dorothy	BBC One	Exists
1969	The Gold Robbers	Series 1, Episode 8: The Arrangement	The dowager	ITV (LWT)	Exists
1969	The Gold Robbers	Series 1, Episode 12: The Man with Two Faces	The dowager	ITV (LWT)	Exists
1969	The Wednesday Play	Series 9, Episode 1: The Last Train Through Harecastle Tunnel	Mrs. Phillips	BBC One	Exists
1969	The Wednesday Play	Series 9, Episode 6: All Out for Kangaroo Valley	Woman in pub	BBC One	Missing
1969	The Flaxton Boys	Series 1, Episode 8: The Witches	Macena	ITV (Yorkshire)	Exists
1970	Germinal	Episodes 3 & 4: Mob Rule / Soldiers	Ma Brûlé	BBC Two	Exists
1970	ITV Playhouse	Series 3, Episode 32: A Sound from the Sea	Woman	ITV	Exists
1970	The Doctors	Episodes 97-104	Alice Platt	BBC One	Missing
1972	New Scotland Yard	Series 1, Episode 3: Memory of a Gauntlet	Mrs. Esther Gruber	ITV (LWT)	All programmes exist from this point
1972	The Onedin Line	Series 2, Episode 3: A Woman Alone	Old woman	BBC One	All programmes exist from this point
1972	Thirty Minutes Worth	Series 1, Episode 6	Unknown	ITV (Thames)	All programmes exist from this point
1973	The Adventures of Black Beauty	Series 1, Episode 25: The Barge	Maggie	ITV (LWT)	All programmes exist from this point
1974	Z-Cars	Series 10, Episode 1: Bits An' Bats	Mrs. McGann	BBC One	All programmes exist from this point
1974	Upstairs, Downstairs	Series 4, Episode 8: The Glorious Dead	Madame Francini	ITV (LWT)	All programmes exist from this point
1976	The Glittering Prizes	Series 1, Episode 6: A Double Life	Mrs. Hersh	BBC Two	All programmes exist from this point
1977	Z-Cars	Series 12, Episode 2: Rage	Mrs. Riley	BBC One	All programmes exist from this point
1977	The Mackinnons	Series 1, Episode 7: Shame the Devil	Christina McSween	BBC One	All programmes exist from this point
1977	Poldark	Series 2, Episodes 1-5	Agatha Poldark	BBC One	All programmes exist from this point
1977	Ripping Yarns	Series 1, Episode 5: Across the Andes by Frog	Old woman	BBC Two	All programmes exist from this point
1977	Just William	Series 2, Episode 5: William the Philanthropist	Mrs. Marsh	ITV (LWT)	All programmes exist from this point
1978	Les Misérables	TV Movie	Lodger	CBS	All programmes exist from this point
1979	Doctor Who	Series 17: The Creature from the Pit (4 episodes)	Karela	BBC One	All programmes exist from this point
1979	Secret Army	Series 3, Episode 10: Collaborator	Woman patient	BBC One	All programmes exist from this point
1980	Fair Stood the Wind for France	TV Movie	Grandmother	BBC One	All programmes exist from this point
1982	Minder	Series 3, Episode 1: Dead Men Do Tell Tales	Mrs. Chamber's mother	ITV (Thames)	All programmes exist from this point
1982	The Hunchback of Notre Dame	TV Movie	Woman in crowd	CBS	All programmes exist from this point
1983	The Old Men at the Zoo	Episode 4: Armageddon	Mrs. Langley-Beard	BBC Two	All programmes exist from this point
1983	By the Sword Divided	Series 1: 9 episodes	Minty	BBC One	All programmes exist from this point
1983	BBC Television Shakespeare	Series 6, Episode 2: Macbeth	Second witch	BBC Two	All programmes exist from this point
1984	Sakharov	TV Movie	Ruf Grigorievna	HBO	All programmes exist from this point
1985	By the Sword Divided	Series 2: 8 episodes	Minty	BBC One	All programmes exist from this point
1985	Mussolini: The Untold Story	Episode 2	Vendor	NBC	All programmes exist from this point
1986	Paradise Postponed	Episodes 10-11: Faith Unfaithful / The Simcox Inheritance	Dora Nowt	ITV (Thames)	All programmes exist from this point
1986	All Passion Spent	All 3 episodes	Genoux	BBC One	All programmes exist from this point
1987	Screen Two	Series 3, Episode 6: Naming the Names	Finn's granny	BBC Two	All programmes exist from this point
1987	One by One	Series 3, Episode 1: Changing Places	Mrs. Maplin	BBC One	All programmes exist from this point
1987	Vanity Fair	Episode 3: Crawley of Queen's Crawley	Mrs. Tinker	BBC One	All programmes exist from this point
1988	The Rainbow	Episodes 1 & 3: Ghosts / The Darkness of Paradise	Lydia Brangwen	BBC One	All programmes exist from this point
1989	War and Remembrance	Episodes 10-11	Mrs. Stern	ABC	All programmes exist from this point
1990	Chillers	Series 1, Episode 12: Under a Dark Angel's Eye	Edna	France 3	All programmes exist from this point
1990	Screen One	Series 2, Episode 6: One Last Chance	Aunt Anna	BBC One	All programmes exist from this point
1991	Bergerac	Series 9, Episode 7: The Waiting Game	Mrs. Edwards	BBC One	All programmes exist from this point
1991	Inspector Morse	Series 5, Episode 4: Greeks Bearing Gifts	Mrs. Papas	ITV (Carlton)	All programmes exist from this point
1991	Birds of a Feather	Series 3, Episode 10: Cuckoo	Irene	BBC One	All programmes exist from this point
1992	Sean's Show	Series 1: 6 episodes	Mrs. Pebbles	Channel 4	All programmes exist from this point
1992	The Bill	Series 8, Episode 74: A Blind Eye	Mrs. Collins	ITV (Thames)	All programmes exist from this point
1993	The Detectives	Series 1, Episode 2: Hostage	Old lady	BBC One	All programmes exist from this point
1993	Century Falls	5 episodes	Alice Harkness	BBC One	All programmes exist from this point
1993	Sean's Show	Series 2, all 7 episodes	Mrs. Pebbles	Channel 4	All programmes exist from this point
