= A King's Story =

1965 documentary film by Harry Booth

- Directed by: Harry Booth
- Written by: Sydney Box; The Duke of Windsor; Glyn Jones
- Produced by: Jack Levin
- Narrated by: Orson Welles
- Cinematography: Dick Bayley
- Edited by: Alan Streeter
- Music by: Ivor Slaney
- Distributed by: BLC/Columbia (a joint venture of British Lion and Columbia)
- Release date: 1965
- Running time: 102 minutes
- Country: United Kingdom
- Language: English

A King's Story is a 1965 British colour documentary film directed by Harry Booth about the life of King Edward VIII, from his birth until abdication in 1936. It was written by Sydney Box (original screen treatment), Glyn Jones and John Lord (commentary) based on the book by The Duke of Windsor.

== Cast ==
- Orson Welles as narrator
- Flora Robson as voice of Queen Mary
- Patrick Wymark as voice of Sir Winston Churchill
- Carleton Hobbs as voice of King George V
- David Warner as voice of Prince of Wales

== Soundtrack ==
An original soundtrack of the music by Ivor Slaney was issued on the Philips label in 1965.

== U.S. release ==
It was released in the United States by Continental Distributing in 1967.

== Reception ==
The Monthly Film Bulletin wrote: "A film compilation of the events which led to the historic abdication of King Edward Viii in 1936. Although it does not proceed biographically beyond the retirement into private life, it presents the Duke and Duchess of Windsor as they are today by means of interspersed colour-film interviews. ... There are similar, though fewer, contributions by the Duchess. Primarily, however, it is an historical compilation which begins in the Victorian era and surveys the childhood and youth of the king-to-be. Some measure of its detail may be deduced from the fact that in just under three-quarters of an hour the biography has only been taken up to the end of the First World War. And there are no irrelevancies, except for a brief compilation designed to summarise the prevailing spirit of the roaring twenties."

Variety wrote: "Jack Le Vien [sic] and his team have done a worthy job with A King's Story, turning out an absorbing documentary slice of history ... Le Vien and director Harry Booth have coaxed some warm, human linking from the Duke and his wife, and the Duke reveals a nice sense of humor. Film is based on the Duke's book. Le Vien ... had the advantage of the Duke's full co-operation, even to the extent of being able to select from nearly 13,000 feet of negative from his own private film library, as well as his physical presence in the film. ... But all this, plus newsreel material and a lot of up to the minute shooting, could have gone down the drain but for a secreenplay and narrative that deftly blend a sense of history, drama, pageantry and, above all, destiny with fitting dignity and plenty of quiet humor. Those anticipating a pepped-up, peephole version of the most dramatic love story of a generation will be somewhat disappointed. About 70 of the film's 102 minutes pass before Mrs. Simpson is mentioned."

Boxoffice wrote: "A King's Story is as colorful and glamorous as any fanciful fiction film and it has its own bright star, the Duke of Windsor. It also has a very serious side and a very melancholy tone ... this is a beautiful work, intercutting rare newsreels and the Duke's personal films with new footage of the homes and locales which form the background of this man's life. A few lapses in taste in the '20s sequences and some padding along the way mar the overall designs. But the ex-King is a real professional with his on-camera comments and, indeed, a truly fascinating subject."

== Accolades ==
The film was nominated for an Academy Award for Best Documentary Feature.

== See also ==
- Orson Welles filmography
