= Love Is a Ball =

1963 film by David Swift

- Hope Lange and Glenn Ford on the soundtrack album cover
- Directed by: David Swift
- Written by: David Swift; Frank Waldman; Tom Waldman
- Based on: The Grand Duke and Mr. Pimm; 1959 novel by Lindsay Hardy
- Produced by: Martin Poll
- Starring: Glenn Ford; Hope Lange; Charles Boyer
- Cinematography: Edmond Séchan
- Edited by: Cathy Kelber; Tom McAdoo
- Music by: Michel Legrand
- Distributed by: United Artists
- Release date: March 1963 (Las Vegas)
- Running time: 111 minutes
- Country: United States
- Language: English

Love Is a Ball (UK title: All This And Money Too; also known as The Grand Duke and Mr. Pimm) is a 1963 romantic comedy film directed by David Swift and starring Glenn Ford, Hope Lange, and Charles Boyer. It is based on the novel The Grand Duke and Mr. Pimm by Lindsay Hardy.

== Plot ==
Etienne Pimm has an unusual way of making a living: he arranges for impoverished European aristocrats to marry unsuspecting rich women. He is then discreetly compensated for his matchmaking. His latest target is Millicent "Millie" Mehaffey, newly arrived on the Riviera.

Pimm and his assistant Janine begin grooming the penniless Grand Duke Gaspard Ducluzeau for Millie by hiring three men. Ex-Oxford academic Julian Soames is to teach him manners and English. As their target fancies herself a race car driver, Pimm recruits John Lathrop Davis, a retired champion many times over, to instruct Gaspard in driving. The third man is world-renowned chef Maurice Zoltan. Pimm himself instructs his protege in the art of romance.

When all is ready, Pimm arranges an "accidental" meeting with Millie's uncle, Dr. Christian Gump (who fancies himself a gourmet), and invites him to a dinner prepared by Zoltan. Gump cannot resist the bait of a meal prepared by a famous chef. After dinner, he is introduced to the handsome young duke, who has undergone weeks of intensive training. As Pimm had hoped, Gump begs him to bring the duke to a party he has arranged for Millie, confiding that he hopes they fall in love and that his troublesome niece will settle down.

Meanwhile, Priory, another of Pimm's minions, has gotten himself hired as the chauffeur in order to spy on the family. When an errant polo ball struck by Gaspard breaks Priory's arm, a reluctant Davis takes his place. Davis is openly contemptuous of Millie's unrealistic plan to compete in the International Grand Prix, clashing repeatedly with his spoiled employer. As they spend more time together though, her initial dislike turns into love.

Unaware of this development and with the romance between Millie and Gaspard not proceeding satisfactorily, Pimm offers Millie the use of his private villa for a romantic night. She takes him up on his offer, only with Davis, not Gaspard.

The next morning, Millie learns the truth and is outraged, even though Pimm confesses that Davis was not the intended groom. For revenge, she decides to marry an oafish suitor named Freddie. However, on her wedding day, her grandmother Mathilda convinces her to reconcile with Davis. This is just fine with Gaspard, as he has fallen for and marries Janine.

== Cast ==
- Glenn Ford as John Lathrop Davis
- Hope Lange as Millicent "Millie" Mehaffey
- Charles Boyer as Etienne Pimm
- Ricardo Montalbán as Duke Gaspard Ducluzeau
- Telly Savalas as Dr. Christian Gump
- Ruth McDevitt as Mathilda
- Ulla Jacobsson as Janine
- Georgette Anys as Mme. Gallou
- Robert Bettoni as milkman
- Mony Dalmès as Mme. Fernier
- Laurence Hardy as Priory
- Jean Le Maitre as Carlo
- André Luguet as Maurice Zoltan
- Jean Parédès as Freddie
- Redmond Phillips as Starcy
- Erika Soucy as Gretl
- Aram Stephan as Gallou
- Olga Valéry as Mme. Giardin
- John Wood as Julian Soames
- Jean-Pierre Zola as Mueller

== Production ==
The novel was published in 1959. Rights were bought by Martin H. Poll of Gold Medal Enterprises; Poll owned Gold Medal Studios in the Bronx, facilities which were hired out to movie makers. He had decided to move into film production. The screenplay was originally written by the author of the novel.

Ford and Lange were signed to star early on. They were already an off-screen couple. Ford had persuaded Frank Capra to cast Lange as his co-star (instead of Shirley Jones) in the 1961 film Pocketful of Miracles, and Lange divorced her husband, fellow actor Don Murray, on July 7, 1961.

Blake Edwards was originally to direct. Eventually David Swift came in to write and direct. Swift had an unhappy time working with Ford, later stating:

Glenn Ford is a man who, I find, approaches his craft like a twelve-year-old temperamental child. Were he mine I would have spanked him physically. But the industry sees fit to accord a star with adult reprimands instead of treating him with childish reprimands. Some of our actors feel they can quit at four o'clock because they're emotionally whacked. So we came to blows about the four o'clock quitting time. And I was greeted with a pouting which I don't find attractive in an adult. Many minor disturbances like this. Hope Lange, a very competent and promising actress, unfortunately got caught up in this business because she was the girl-friend of Glenn Ford. So he cast her in the picture... Most actors in this town are much too free a hand with the script. They begin to pose attitudes and defiances and changes on a script, an area where they don't function too well. They're too emotional. They're not professional about writing. Charles Boyer, who was also in the picture, is one of the real professionals, a creative actor.

Ulla Jacobsson signed to make her American debut with the film.

The film was shot location on the French Riviera.

It had its world premiere in Las Vegas.

== Reception ==
The Monthly Film Bulletin wrote: "Connoisseurs of plutocratic vulgarity will relish much of this romantic extravaganza, from a chef's creation iced to look like an insurance office, and champagne sucked from toothbrush bristles, to an anthology of the Riviera's most hideously opulent interiors. Surpassing these is Pimm's lakeside love-nest, booby-trapped with massive erotic statuary, and as elegant of décor as a Farouk palace. To do justice to the architectural and other ironies, Edmond Séchan's photography assures compositions and colour quality of admirable standard. As for the humans, Hope Lange combines the looks, shape, charm, and rare comedienne's ability to carry off the role of a man-eating tomboy millionairess with a nice line in sadism for chaste chauffeurs – "Ever waxed a Bentley by moonlight?". ...Yet, too often one feels that the director has missed a trick. Ricardo Montalban's scenes go for little; the verbal wit is not up to the level of the visual felicities; there is some gear-crashing editing; Michel Legrand's score tries too hard; certainly the film is too long. Those extra few moments of self-doubt and self-discipline, if only in the cutting-room, would have helped so much."

Bosley Crowther, critic for The New York Times, panned it, writing that "If 'Love Is a Ball,' somebody fumbled." He found it "predictable nearly every step of the way" and "laboriously arch in tone, broadly played in general and directed with slapdash aimlessness by Mr. Swift." He noted that the "sun-kissed scenery, though, should set anyone drooling". He mentioned the "determined, good-natured attitude of a game cast headed by Glenn Ford, Hope Lange and Charles Boyer", and in particular found Montalban and Jacobsson "entirely disarming."

Lindsay Hardy, author of the novel and of the earlier radio serial The Knave of Hearts upon which the novel was based, disliked the film. Hardy stated that the film "bore no relation to the book whatever – plot gone, people gone. You would never know there had ever been a book. What makes the movie men tick I cannot understand. They buy a story, get A, B, C, and D to write various screenplays from it, and then shoot a movie about something else entirely. So what are you to make of them? It was in colour and looked very pretty... but apart from that it had nothing and was not too well received. Not that it made a scrap of difference to me. I had been paid and the money handed over to doctors and hospitals long before it ever appeared on the screen. In my last letter to Marty Poll [the producer] I asked him why, oh why Marty-boy, do you bother to buy books at all? He hummed and hawed."

== See also ==
- List of American films of 1963
