= Assignment Redhead =

1956 British film by Maclean Rogers

- British quad poster
- Directed by: Maclean Rogers
- Screenplay by: Maclean Rogers
- Based on: Requiem for a Redhead by Lindsay Hardy
- Produced by: William G. Chalmers; Richard Gordon
- Starring: Richard Denning; Carole Mathews; Ronald Adam; Danny Green
- Cinematography: Ernest Palmer
- Edited by: Peter Mayhew
- Music by: Wilfred Burns
- Production companies: Amalgamated Productions; Butcher's Film Distributors
- Distributed by: Rank Film Organisation (UK)
- Release date: 1956
- Running time: 79 mins
- Countries: United Kingdom; United States
- Language: English
- Budget: over £15,000

Assignment Redhead (U.S. title: Million Dollar Manhunt) is a 1956 British second feature ('B') crime thriller film written and directed by Maclean Rogers. It was based on the novel Requiem for a Redhead by Lindsay Hardy.

== Synopsis ==
Murderous international master criminal Dumetrius specialises in providing false travel documents. He flies to London from post-war Berlin to retrieve twelve million dollars in counterfeit cash. With the aide of his confederate Hedy, a redheaded cabaret singer, he covers his tracks and kills one passenger retrieving an identifying photograph and frames another man for the murder. American Major Keen is working attached to British intelligence and pursues him. Keen falls for Hedy, who is under Dumetrius's control, compromising the investigation.

== Cast ==
- Richard Denning as Major Gregory Keen
- Carole Mathews as Hedy Bergner
- Ronald Adam as Major Scammel / Dumetrius
- Danny Green as Yotti Blum
- Brian Worth as Captain Peter Ridgeway
- Jan Holden as Sally Jennings
- Hugh Moxey as Sergeant Tom Coutts
- Peter Swanwick as Monsieur Paul Bonnet
- Elwyn Brook-Jones as Digby Mitchel
- Ronald Leigh-Hunt as Colonel Julian Fentriss, M.I.5.
- Robert O'Neil as Captain Hank Godowski
- Paul Hardtmuth as Dr. Buchmann
- Bill Nagy as Marzotti
- Alex Gallier as Max Rubenstein
- Robert Bruce as staff officer
- George Holdcroft as nightclub diner

== Production ==
The film was the first of seven made by Richard Gordon's Amalgamated Productions. It was a co-production with Butcher's Film Distributors.

The film was made for under £15,000 plus the salaries and expenses of the American participants.

== Reception ==
The Monthly Film Bulletin wrote: "Confused and improbable, the film's central situation is developed with little imagination or tension. Script and direction also follow a firmly predictable pattern."

Kine Weekly wrote: "A strong Anglo-American cast puts a kick into its hearty highlights and the backgrounds are widely varied. It'll keep the ninepennies on the qui vive. Very good British programmer."

In The Radio Times Guide to Films David Parkinson gave the film 1/5 stars, writing: "This dismal thriller has all the hallmarks of a Butcher's production: shoddy script, cheap settings and a cast of has-beens and no-hopers. Ronald Adam can just about hold his head up as the crook intent on blagging counterfeit Nazi cash, but the rest of the cast is just inept.
