= The Vicious Circle (1957 film) =

- Directed by: Gerald Thomas
- Written by: Francis Durbridge
- Produced by: Peter Rogers
- Starring: John Mills; Lionel Jeffries; Wilfrid Hyde-White; Noelle Middleton
- Cinematography: Otto Heller
- Edited by: Peter Boita
- Music by: Stanley Black
- Distributed by: Beaconsfield Productions
- Release date: September 22, 1957 (United Kingdom)
- Running time: 84 min
- Country: United Kingdom
- Language: English

The Vicious Circle (also known as The Circle) is a 1957 British thriller film directed by Gerald Thomas and starring John Mills, Noelle Middleton, Wilfrid Hyde-White and Lionel Jeffries. It was written by Francis Durbridge based on his TV serial My Friend Charles (1956). The screenplay concerns a leading Harley Street specialist who is forced to work with the police to nail a gang of international criminals, after being falsely accused of murder.

== Plot ==
Doctor Howard Latimer answers what he believes to be a request for a favour from an American friend by picking up a famous German actress from London Airport. He goes in the company of a journalist Geoffrey Windsor who tags along after failing to gain an interview with Latimer about recent medical research. As Latimer is already late for a date with his fiancée at the Royal Festival Hall, he lets Windsor take the actress to Claridges Hotel.

When her body is later discovered in Latimer's flat, with absolutely no trace of Windsor, he is faced with questions from the police. DI Dane is initially sympathetic but as the evidence mounts up it increasingly seems as if only Latimer could have committed the murder. Latimer has the added problem of Mrs Ambler, a patient referred to him by his colleague Doctor Kimber, who keeps changing her suspicious story. With the evidence looking as though he will be charged, he goes to stay at his friend Kenneth Palmer's house where he hopes to avoid the police. While there he encounters the mysterious "Robert Brady" who shows a strange interest in a matchbook given to Latimer by the German actress.

When Mrs Ambler's dead body is found suspicion again points towards Latimer. However DI Dane appears to believe in his innocence. When Latimer is approached by Windsor demanding £4,000 in blackmail – not from Latimer but from Doctor Kimber – the police reveal that they know more about the case than they had been letting on. Latimer is introduced to the man he believed to be Brady who is in fact Major Harrington who works in Intelligence. Harrington reveals that the case revolves around a passport-forging ring led by an Englishman at its head. Latimer then works with the police to help unmask the criminal amongst his acquaintances.

== Cast ==
- John Mills as Doctor Howard Latimer
- Derek Farr as Kenneth Palmer
- Noelle Middleton as Laura James
- Wilfrid Hyde-White as Major Harrington/Robert Brady
- Roland Culver as Detective Inspector Dane
- Mervyn Johns as Doctor George Kimber
- Rene Ray as Mrs Ambler
- Lionel Jeffries as Geoffrey Windsor
- Lisa Daniely as Frieda Veldon
- David Williams as Detective Sergeant
- Diana Lambert as Latimer's office nurse
- Hal Osmond as Joe, the golf caddy

== Production ==
Thomas and Rogers were offered the film after impressing the Woolf Brothers on Time Lock.

== Critical reception ==
The Monthly Film Bulletin wrote: "'The team of Peter Rogers and Gerald Thomas, who made Timelock from a Canadian television play, have now tackled a very different product of the small screen. Francis Durbridge has made a smooth adaptation of his own television serial Brass Candlestick, but he has not altogether succeeded in disguising its episodic origin; and only a high degree of polish in direction, editing and photography masks the shallow characterisation and the absurdly over-complicated plot."

In The New York Times, Bosley Crowther thought the film was "of not too high an order in the mystery melodrama line. Francis Durbridge's fiction, which has a forgery ring at its core, is considerably farfetched and frenzied, not to mention cluttered and confused...Actually, the actors in it are some of Britain's best, from Mr. Mills and Mr. Culver to Wilfrid Hyde White and Mervyn Johns."

A reviewer for Sky Movies wrote that the film has "one of the most tortuous plots ever devised...The suspense mounts steadily under master thriller writer Francis Durbridge's guiding hand, and most English critics were won over by the results. An excellent cast will keep you guessing throughout."
