= Joyce Howard =

British actress (1922–2010)

- Born: 28 February 1922; London, England
- Died: 23 November 2010 (aged 88); Santa Monica, California
- Occupations: Actress, writer, story analyst
- Spouse(s): Basil Sydney (m. 1946; div. 1958); Joel Shor (m. 1961; div. 19??)
- Children: 3; Rowena and two others from her first marriage

Joyce Howard (28 February 1922 – 23 November 2010) was an English actress, writer, and film executive.

== Acting career ==
After studying at RADA, she was spotted by film director Anthony Asquith in a play at London's Embassy Theatre. He cast the 19-year-old in Freedom Radio (1941), and starring roles in films followed, including opposite James Mason in The Night Has Eyes and They Met in the Dark, the former winning her rave reviews.

She was also active in theatre, including Romeo and Juliet at the Old Vic and in A Streetcar Named Desire. She performed in London throughout World War II, even as Nazis were bombing the city.

== Writing career and personal life ==
In 1950, after 13 films, she more or less retired from acting to raise her three children by actor Basil Sydney. Howard also began a second career as a writer. She wrote three well-received novels, Two Persons Singular (1960), A Private View (1961) and Going On (2000). She also wrote plays, including Broken Silence, which was produced by the BBC. After her divorce from Sydney, Howard married American psychoanalyst Joel Shor, and moved to California in 1964.

Although the couple eventually separated, Howard remained in California. To support her family as a single mother, she embarked on a third career as a story analyst for network television. She was promoted to executive and story editor at Paramount Pictures and Paramount TV, eventually becoming responsible for property acquisition and development.

She also continued to write for television and wrote original treatments for the miniseries The Whiteoaks and Picasso's Painted Ladies. At the request of Henry Miller's widow, Howard collated, edited and wrote the introduction to Letters by Henry Miller to Hoki Tokuda Miller (1986).

== Filmography ==
Year	Title	Role	Notes
1941	Freedom Radio	Elly	
1941	Love on the Dole	Helen Hawkins	
1941	The Common Touch	Mary	
1942	Back-Room Boy	Betty	
1942	The Night Has Eyes	Marian Ives	
1942	Talk About Jacqueline	June Marlow	
1943	The Gentle Sex	Anne Lawrence	
1943	They Met in the Dark	Laura Verity	
1946	They Knew Mr. Knight	Freda Blake	
1946	Appointment with Crime	Carol Dane	
1947	Woman to Woman	Nicolette Bonnet	
1947	Mrs. Fitzherbert	Maria Fitzherbert	
1950	Shadow of the Past	Lady in Black	
