= Culleenamore =

Beach in Ireland

- Beach
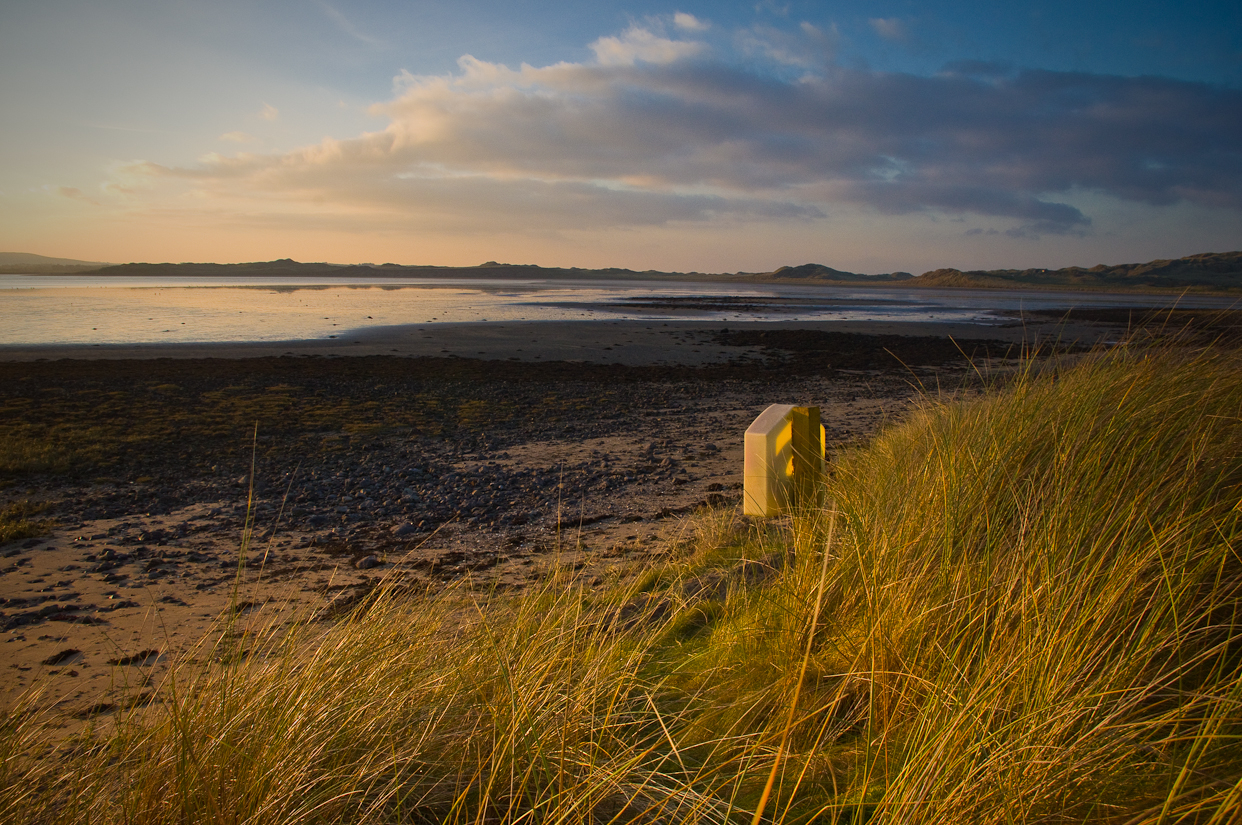

- Location in Ireland
- Coordinates: 54°15′30″N 8°35′57″W
- Location: County Sligo, Ireland
- Water bodies: Ballysadare Bay

Culleenamore is a beach located south of Strandhill, at the mouth of Ballysadare Bay in County Sligo, Ireland. The beach is the site of a 200 metre-long midden, mostly of oyster shells, dating to around 1000 AD.

== Gallery ==
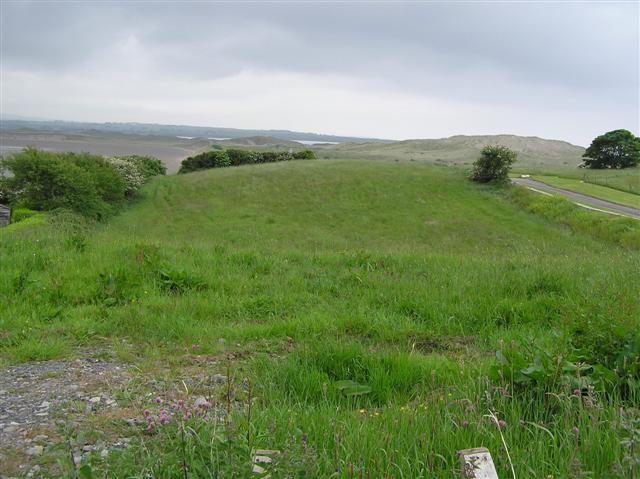
Culleenamore Beach, looking southwest

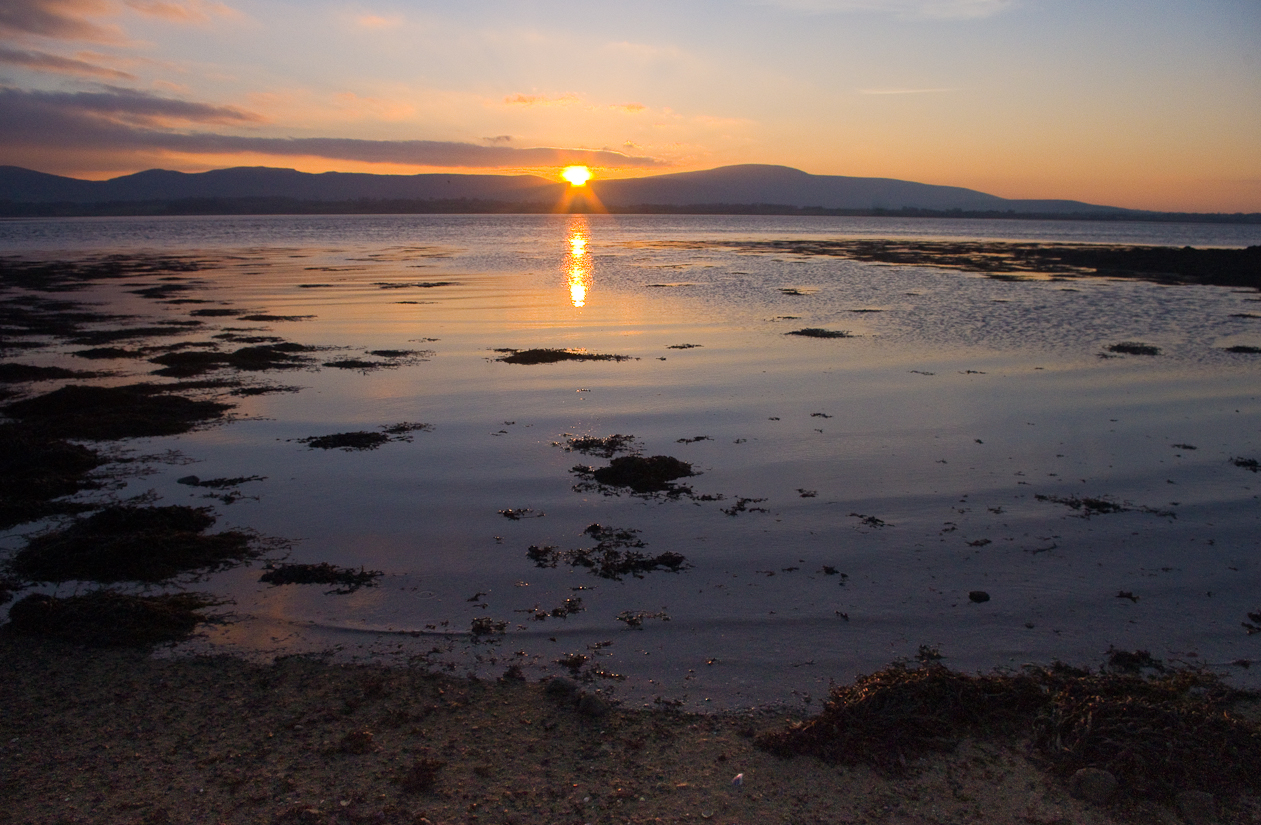
Sunset over Ox Mountains, as seen from Culleenamore
