= Anthony Bushell =

English actor (1904–1997)

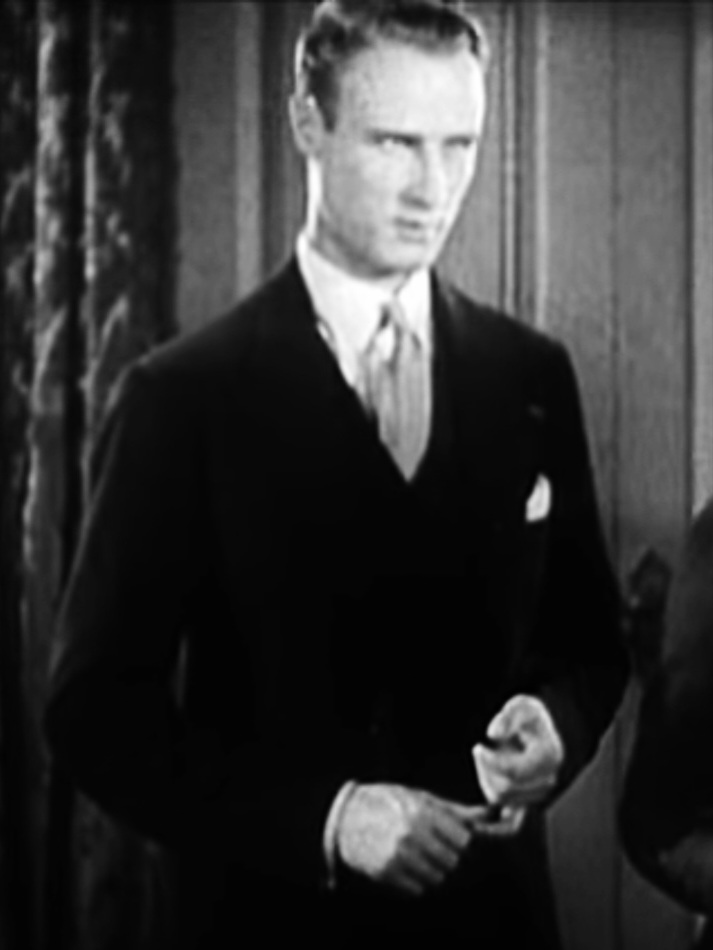
- Bushell in The Royal Bed (1931)
- Born: Anthony Arnatt Bushell; 19 May 1904; Westerham, Kent, England
- Died: 2 April 1997 (aged 92); Oxford, England
- Occupation: Actor
- Years active: 1923–1964
- Spouses: Zelma O'Neal (m. 1928; div. 1935) Anne Pearce-Serocold (m. 1955)

Anthony Arnatt Bushell (19 May 1904 – 2 April 1997) was an English film actor and director who appeared in more than 50 films between 1929 and 1961. He played Colonel Breen in the BBC serial Quatermass and the Pit (1958–59), and also appeared in and directed various British TV series such as Danger Man.

== Early life ==
Bushell was born in Westerham, Kent and was educated at Magdalen College School, and then Hertford College, Oxford, where he was the stroke on the college rowing eight, and belonged to the Hypocrites' Club. After Oxford, he trained at the Royal Academy of Dramatic Art and got his start on stage from Sir Gerald du Maurier, making his theatrical debut in Sardou's Diplomacy at the Adelphi Theatre in 1924.

== Career ==
He worked in the U.S. for a time in 1927–28, touring in Her Cardboard Lover with Jeanne Eagels.

In 1928, he met American actress Zelma O'Neal (1903–1989), who was performing on the London stage in the musical Good News. They married in New York on 22 November 1928, when he was appearing on Broadway in Maugham's The Sacred Flame and she was preparing to open in the musical Follow Thru. George Arliss saw Bushell on Broadway the play and when he was cast as the lead in his first talkie, the American film Disraeli (1929), recommended Bushell for the role of Disraeli's young rival Charles Deeford.

Bushell was cast in another American film Jealousy (1929), but after shooting was completed all his scenes were re-shot with Fredric March at the insistence of the film's star Jeanne Eagels. His other Hollywood films, several of which saw him in the military roles that became his specialty, included Journey's End (1930), Three Faces East (1930) with Erich von Stroheim, Five Star Final (1931) with Edward G. Robinson, Chances (1931) with Douglas Fairbanks Jr., Vanity Fair (1932) with Myrna Loy, and A Woman Commands (1932) with Pola Negri in her first sound picture.

In 1930, he and his wife took a delayed honeymoon trip to Germany, France, and England, leaving on the Nieuw Amsterdam in April and returning to New York in July.

Bushell and O'Neal relocated to London in 1932, where she established a second stage career. They divorced in 1935. Following their divorce, they appeared in the same show at least once, though they did not appear together on stage. O'Neal appeared in Swing Along in Manchester and London in 1936. She returned to New York in June 1937.

Bushell remained in England and played more important roles in several films: The Midshipmaid (1932) with Jessie Matthews; Boris Karloff's horror film The Ghoul (1933) where he played the romantic lead; The Scarlet Pimpernel (1934) with Leslie Howard; Dark Journey (1937) with Vivien Leigh; and The Arsenal Stadium Mystery (1939) in which the Arsenal football team appeared and played a match against a fictitious team called the "Trojans." Bushell played Trojans start John Doyce who is poisoned during a match. He also had a brief affair with Patricia Roc, with whom he appeared and gave her first onscreen kiss in film The Rebel Son (1938) set in 17th-century Ukraine. In a sarcastic assessment of the film, which he left after a half-hour, Graham Greene wrote in The Spectator: "I liked particularly the scene when the young Cossack (played by Mr Anthony Bushell with his keen young Oxford accent) bursts into the bedroom of the girl he loves, 'I know it's very late to call but ... O I am glad you are not angry.'" In The Lion Has Wings (1939), a documentary-style anti-German propaganda film, he was cast, in one critic's words, as one of several "idiosyncratic but not over well-known actors" who could stand in for RAF crew members.

On the outbreak of World War II in 1939 he enlisted with the British Army, receiving a commission as an officer in the Welsh Guards. He saw action in the Guards Armoured Division as a tank squadron commander. During the war, he married his second wife, Anne Pearce Serocold, daughter of Brigadier Eric P Serocold and Beatrice Lucy Rice, the daughter of Admiral Ernest Rice, who was mentioned by David Niven as the wife of one of his fellow officers.

After the war, he developed a professional relationship with Laurence Olivier, and was the associate producer of Hamlet (1948), and later as associate director on two more films which Olivier both directed and starred in, Richard III (1955) and The Prince and the Showgirl (1957). Colin Clark, who worked as an assistant on the latter, wrote in his diary: "I don't think Tony [Bushell] could direct traffic in Cheltenham. Despite his imposing appearance he is really a pussy cat, but [Olivier] needs a chum to guard his rear, as it were, and it is a great joy to have Tony around. He has a heart the size of a house which he loves to hide behind a glare." He described Bushell at the time: "Tony looks like a bluff military man–bald, red-faced and jovial. In fact he was in the Guards during the war and almost everyone forgets he is an actor."

Bushell directed for the first time in 1950, using material from an earlier Austrian filmed called Der Engel mit der Posaune, substituting new scenes with British actors where necessary and dubbing minor roles to create an English-language version, The Angel with the Trumpet. Bushell also took the role of Baron Traun, companion to Rudolf, Crown Prince of Austria.

Of his direction in partnership with Reginald Beck of The Long Dark Hall (1951), one critic wrote: "The tandem direction is surprisingly able and occasionally inventive."

In the early 1960s, he directed segments of The Valiant Years, a documentary based on the memoirs of Winston Churchill. Though it was a documentary, and BBC's rules then forbade their programmes featuring re-enactments, Bushell appeared in one scene as an RAF air marshal deriding British attempts to sway German public opinion by dropping leaflets on their cities early in World War II. He was filling in for Sir Arthur "Bomber" Harris and speaking Harris' words only because illness prevented Harris from participating on the day scheduled for filming.

== Final years ==
Bushell retired in 1964, and he later served as director of the Monte Carlo Golf Club. He died in Oxford on 2 April 1997. He was 92.

== Partial filmography ==
=== Actor ===
- Disraeli (1929) – Charles
- The Show of Shows (1929) – Performer in 'Henry VI' Sequence (uncredited)
- Lovin' the Ladies (1930) – Brooks – the Butler
- Journey's End (1930) – 2nd Lt. Hibbert
- The Flirting Widow (1930) – Bobby
- Three Faces East (1930) – Capt. Arthur Chamberlain
- The Royal Bed (1931) – Freddie Granton
- Born to Love (1931) – Leslie Darrow
- Chances (1931) – Tom Ingleside
- Five Star Final (1931) – Phillip Weeks
- Expensive Women (1931) – Arthur Raymond
- A Woman Commands (1932) – Lt. Iwan Petrovitch
- Shop Angel (1932) – Larry Pemberton
- Vanity Fair (1932) – Dobbin
- Escapade (1932) – Philip Whitney
- The Silver Greyhound (1932) – Gerald Varrick
- Sally Bishop (1932) – Bart
- The Midshipmaid (1932) – Lt. Valentine
- Soldiers of the King (1933) – Lt. Ronald Jamieson
- The Ghoul (1933) – Ralph Morlant
- I Was a Spy (1933) – Otto
- Channel Crossing (1933) – Peter Bradley
- Crime on the Hill (1933) – Tony Fields
- Red Wagon (1933) – Toby Griffiths
- Love at Second Sight (1934) – Bill
- Forbidden Territory (1934) – Rex Farringdon
- The Scarlet Pimpernel (1934) – Sir Andrew Ffoulkes
- Lilies of the Field (1934) – Guy Mallory
- Admirals All (1935) – Flag Lt. Steve Langham
- Dusty Ermine (1936) – Det. Insp. Forsythe
- Dark Journey (1937) – Bob Carter
- Farewell Again (1937) – Roddy Hammond
- The Angelus (1937) – Brian Ware
- The Return of the Scarlet Pimpernel (1937) – Sir Andrew Foulkes
- The Rebel Son (1938) – Andrei Bulba
- The Arsenal Stadium Mystery (1939) – John Doyce – Trojan Team Member
- The Lion Has Wings (1939) – Pilot
- For Those in Peril (1944) – (uncredited)
- Hamlet (1948) – Bit Part (uncredited)
- The Small Back Room (US title Hour of Glory, 1949) – Col. Strang
- The Angel with the Trumpet (1950) – Baron Hugo Traun
- The Miniver Story (1950) – Dr. Kaneslaey
- The Long Dark Hall (1951) – Clive Bedford
- High Treason (1951) – Maj. Elliott
- Who Goes There! (1952) – Major Guy Ashley
- The Red Beret (1953) – General Whiting
- The Black Knight (1954) – King Arthur
- The Purple Plain (1954) – Group Captain Aldridge
- The Black Tent (1956) – Ambassador Baring
- Bhowani Junction (1956) – Lanson (uncredited)
- The Battle of the River Plate (1956) – Mr. Millington Drake – British Minister, Montevideo
- Bitter Victory (1957) – General Paterson
- The Wind Cannot Read (1958) – Brigadier
- A Night to Remember (1958) – Capt. Arthur Rostron – Carpathia
- Quatermass and the Pit (TV Series, 1958–1959) – Colonel James Breen
- Desert Mice (1959) – Plunkett
- The Queen's Guards (1961) – Major Cole

=== Director ===
Film

- The Angel with the Trumpet (1950)
- The Long Dark Hall (1951)
- The Terror of the Tongs (1961)

Television

- The Third Man (6 episodes, 1959)
- The Four Just Men (3 episodes, 1959–60)
- The Valiant Years (1960)
- Danger Man (2 episodes, 1961)
- Sir Francis Drake (2 episodes, 1961–62)
- The Scales of Justice (1 episode, 1962)
- Man of the World (2 episodes, 1962)
- The Saint (1 episode, 1962)
