= Strandhill =

Town in County Sligo, Ireland

Strandhill An Leathros (Irish)
- Town
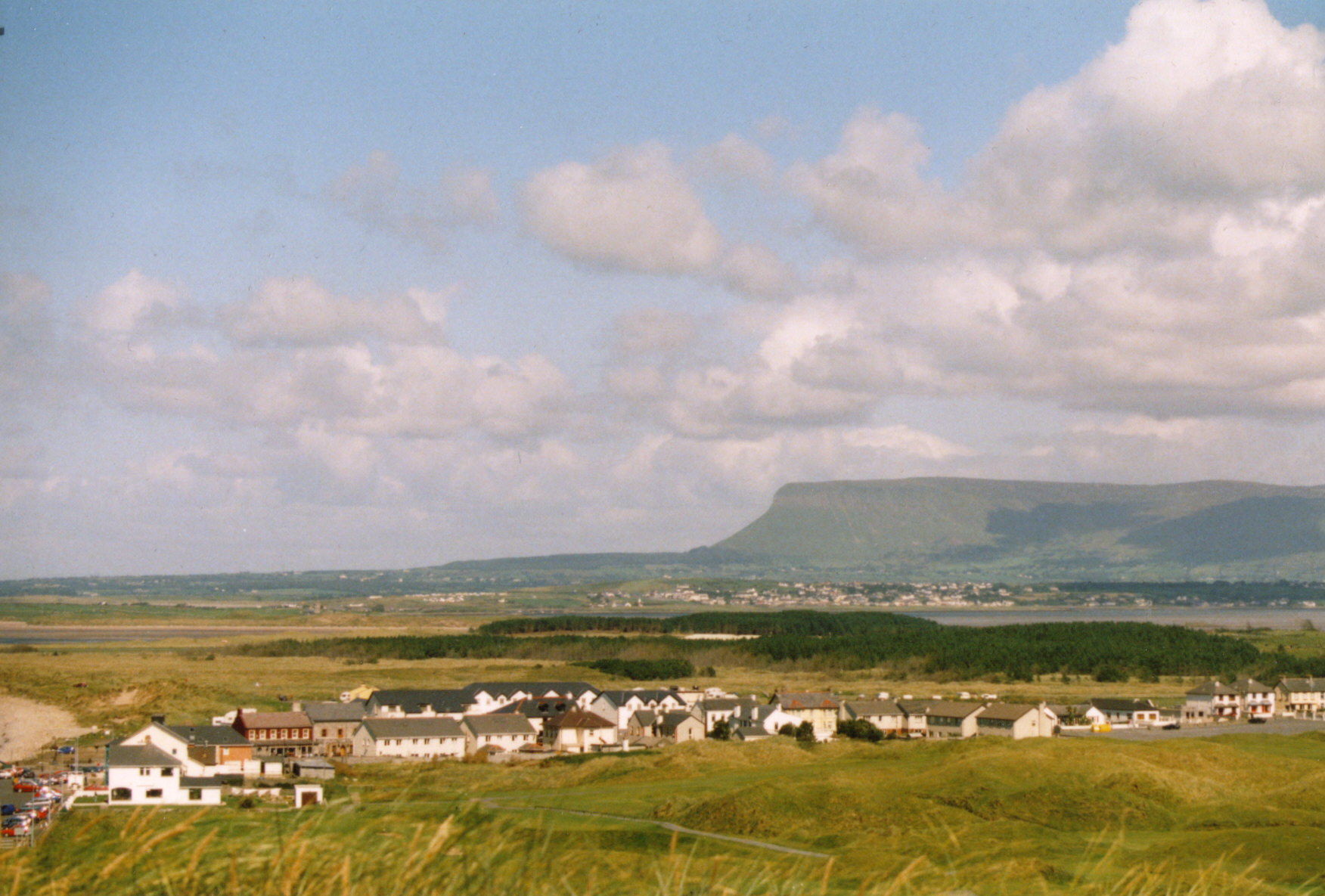

- Location in Ireland
- Coordinates: 54°16′19″N 8°35′36″W
- Country: Ireland
- Province: Connacht
- County: County Sligo
- Elevation: 36 m (118 ft)

Population (2022)
  - Total: 1,982
- Time zone: UTC±0 (WET)
  - Summer (DST): UTC+1 (IST)
- Eircode routing key: F91
- Telephone area code: +353(0)71
- Irish Grid Reference: G613360

Strandhill or occasionally Larass (Irish: An Leathros) is a coastal town and townland on the Coolera Peninsula in County Sligo, Ireland. As of 2022, the population was 1,982, an increase of 40% from the 2006 census. The old name appears to be Ros Dragnige (see Killaspugbrone).

== History ==
It is suggested the development of Strandhill can be attributed to a Benjamin Murrow who purchased the undeveloped land from the upper road in 1895 for £1,760. He constructed a roadway to the sea for £1,000, and offered plots either side of the roadway, which he named Buenos Ayres Drive. In 1912 he constructed a bathhouse to attract visitors. Buenos Ayres drive was conveyed into public ownership in 1928, and the strip of land to the shore in 1936.

== Location ==
Strandhill is situated at the western base of Knocknarea on the Cúil Irra (Coolera) peninsula in Sligo Bay, 7 km (4 mi) west of the centre of Sligo town, and faces the Atlantic Ocean. Although the main part of the village lies within the townland of Strandhill, it also extends into the townlands of Killaspugbrone and Carrowbunnaun. The area is well known for surfing, as well as walks.

== Surrounding area ==
Strandhill's surrounding areas include the mountain of Knocknarea, Coney Island, Culleenamore beach, and Dorrins Strand. Much of the terrain consists of marram-covered dunes, and the local council has had to undertake various measures throughout the years to combat coastal erosion.

== Amenities ==
Strandhill has a caravan park, pubs, restaurants/cafes, St Asicus National School, St Patrick's Church, St Annes Church of Ireland and the Strandhill surgery. The village has multiple hostels and lodges.

== Recreation ==
=== Surfing ===
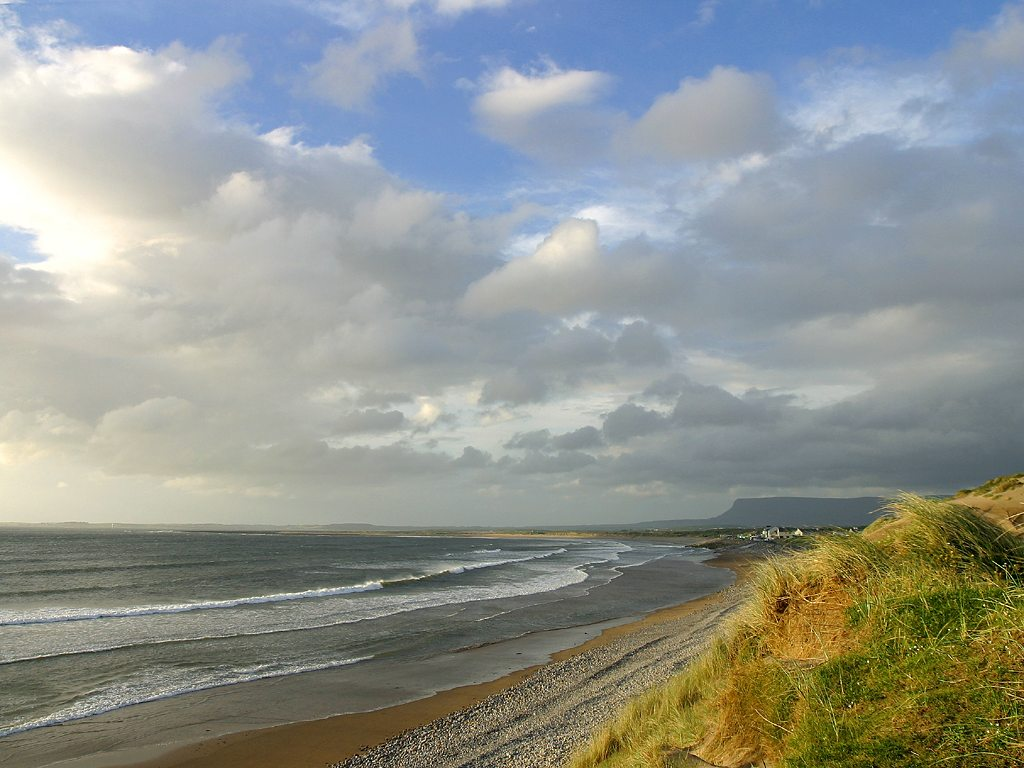
Strandhill beach

Strandhill is a vast beach break capable of holding huge waves in the right conditions. Surfing is usually best when the tide is on the push in from mid to high tide.

While Strandhill's beach is renowned for surfing, it is not safe for swimming. The nearby strand at Culleenamore is suitable for paddling.

=== Sport ===
Strandhill has a soccer club named Strand Celtic and Sligo Rugby Football Club is based in Hamilton Park, where tag rugby is also played. Coolera/Strandhill GAA club involves Strandhill and the neighbouring parish of Ransboro, and also field a hurling team.

The local 18-hole golf course has been described as having "undulating fairways and unforgiving short cuts".

== Places of interest ==
Dolly's Cottage, a 200-year-old traditional thatched cottage, is open to the public.

The Klaus Gundchen sculpture on a plinth at the entrance to the beach was removed by the council on 22 February 2016.

The Strandhill Peoples Market takes place at Sligo airport every Sunday. The market has stalls selling locally produced foods, textiles, and crafts. It has been nominated for the best new business in Sligo Leader Business Awards 2015 and also nominated for the best start up in the IBYE awards.

== Annual events ==
The Culleenamore Races is an annual beach pony and horseracing event dating from the 1800s that takes place early in the summer

The Warriors Run, a 15k race held annually since 1985, takes participants from the beach front in Strandhill around and then up the nearby Knocknarea mountain, to the cairn at the top, and back again, as music and festivities takes over the town.

The annual Strandhill Guitar Festival is held in late September.

== Transport ==
Strandhill is the site of Sligo Airport, which opened in 1983. There is a regular bus service to Sligo town.

== Notable residents ==
Westlife's Kian Egan and his wife, actress and model Jodi Albert, live in Strandhill with their children.

== See also ==
- List of towns and villages in the Republic of Ireland
