= Lindsay Hardy =

Australian novelist, playwright and screenwriter (1914–1994)

- Born: 17 September 1914; Victor Harbor, South Australia
- Died: 7 February 1994 (aged 79); London, England
- Writing career
- Language: English

Lindsay John Hardy (17 Sep 1914 – 7 Feb 1994) was an Australian novelist, playwright, and screenwriter who worked in Australia, the US, and the UK. He is regarded as one of the greatest writers for Australian radio drama.

== Early life ==
A native of South Australia, Lindsay Hardy received his education at Strathalbyn and Victor Harbor. He attended the University of Adelaide but did not graduate, and worked as a salesman in Sydney. He enlisted in 1939 and fought in the El Alamein and Papua New Guinea battles of World War II. In 1942, he was wounded by a shrapnel in North Africa; and in November 1943, his left arm was permanently disabled by a grenade in New Guinea.

== Writing career ==
Back in Australia, Hardy wrote radio scripts in the late 1940s, first in Melbourne for Donovan Joyce, and then from 1950 in Sydney with Grace Gibson. After marrying in 1952 he moved to the US to write for television, but unsatisfied with the treatment of his scripts in Hollywood, he relocated to New York City. In about 1959–1960 he was in the UK, writing thrillers for the BBC and ITV. He wrote scripts for the TV shows Man of the World (1962–1963) and The Sentimental Agent (1963).

Kirkus Reviews described his novel The Grand Duke and Mr. Pimm as "No mark to leave on the literary world here, but plenty of clean cutting up in a literate manner. Fun."

== Film adaptations ==
- Assignment Redhead, 1956 film based on his novel Requiem for a Redhead
- Love Is a Ball, 1963 film based on his novel The Grand Duke and Mr. Pimm
