= Ivor Slaney =

British composer and conductor (1921–1998)

Ivor Ernst Slaney (27 May 1921 – 20 March 1998) was a British composer and conductor, notable for his work in film, television and radio.

Slaney's father Ernst Wallace Slaney was the principal cellist in the Bournemouth Municipal Orchestra in the 1920s and 1930s under Sir Dan Godfrey. His mother was Grace Elizabeth Arney (born 22 April 1893, died July 1988). She married Ernst in Bristol in 1920. Born in West Bromwich, as a youngster Ivor joined the choir of St Stephen's Church, Bournemouth where he was also taught by Percy Whitlock, the church's Director of Music and a colleague of Ernst Slaney at the Bournemouth Pavilion. According to Whitlock's diary, Ivor was known as 'Tiny'.

In 1935, aged 14, Ivor entered the Royal Artillery in Woolwich and gained a scholarship to the Royal College of Music, where he studied oboe with Léon Goossens and made friends with Malcolm Arnold. During the war he joined up as a musician in the Royal Army Ordnance Corps, and afterwards worked for a time as an orchestral player with the London Philharmonic, the Covent Garden Opera House Orchestra and the Boyd Neel Orchestra. He married pianist Mary Dawn Ludlow (known by her stage name, Dolores Ventura) in 1948, divorcing her in 1969 and remarrying in 1974.

In later life, Ivor Slaney lived in Milford on Sea, Hampshire. His son Adrian E. Slaney, a lawyer specialising in healthcare, was born in 1950. A daughter was born in 1979. Ivor died in Southampton in 1998, aged 76.

== Composition and arrangements ==
Slaney was the uncredited arranger for many recordings by the 101 Strings in the early 1960s, and was a prolific contributor to the recorded music libraries, particularly DeWolfe. His best-known works include "Top Dog", which was used as the theme music for the BBC radio comedy series The Men from the Ministry and "Carlos' Theme" (from The Sentimental Agent) for which he won an Ivor Novello award. He also wrote numerous short orchestral light music pieces, such as the suite Three Village Greens, the "Sighing Waltz" and "Window Gazing", as well as the choral work Mass of Saint Richard (1970).

He wrote the music for several Hammer Films, including 36 Hours (1953), The Gambler and the Lady (1953), Spaceways (1953), and The House Across the Lake (1954), as well as the scores to A King's Story (1965), The Strange Case of the End of Civilization as We Know It (1977), Prey (1977), Terror (1978), and Death Ship (1980).

Slaney arranged "Non Stop", the theme tune for Independent Television News by John Malcolm, used from 1955 to 1982. He was composer and musical director for the British Children's Film Foundation cinema movie series The Magnificent Six and 1/2 from 1968–69, as well as the TV series Here Come the Double Deckers (1970–71) which followed it. He also composed the theme to the Harry Worth TV show whose opening titles showed the famous "window routine". Some of his "Dramatic Impacts" were featured in Blackadder Goes Forth, The Simpsons, The Ren and Stimpy Show, Bill Nye the Science Guy, SpongeBob SquarePants, Beavis and Butt-head, and Camp Lazlo.
