= Ian Stuart Black =

British novelist, playwright and screenwriter (1915–1997)

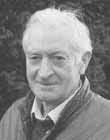
- Born: 21 March 1915; London, England
- Died: 13 October 1997 (aged 82); Honiton, Devon, England
- Occupation: Writer

Ian Stuart Black (21 March 1915 – 13 October 1997) was a British novelist, playwright and screenwriter. Both his 1959 novel In the Wake of a Stranger and his 1962 novel about the Cyprus emergency, The High Bright Sun, were made into films, Black writing the screenplays in each case.

== Early life ==
Black attended Daniel Stewart's College in Edinburgh and Manchester University, where he studied philosophy. After writing a one-act play and submitting it to the Donald Wolfit Theatre Company, he was asked to join them as an actor. Here he met his wife, the actress Anne Brooke, whom he married just prior to being called up for service in the Second World War. Following service with RAF Intelligence in the Middle East, he was demobilised in 1946.

== Writing ==
He later wrote scripts for several British television programmes from the 1950s to the 1970s, including The Invisible Man and Sir Francis Drake (for which he was also story editor), as well as Danger Man (on which he served as associate producer) and Star Maidens.

In addition, he wrote three stories for Doctor Who in 1966 and 1967. These stories were The Savages and The War Machines (with Kit Pedler and Pat Dunlop) for William Hartnell's Doctor; and The Macra Terror for Patrick Troughton. He novelised all three stories for Target Books. Of these three serials Black wrote for the show, only The War Machines is still known to exist in full. Both The Savages and The Macra Terror are completely missing from the BBC Archives.

His final credit was for a half-hour supernatural drama called House of Glass, which was made by Television South in 1991.

== Selected filmography ==
- The Limping Man (1953)
- Soho Incident (aka Spin a Dark Web) (1956)
- The Swagman (1965)
- The High Bright Sun (1965)
