= All at Sea (1977 film) =

- Based on: story by Howard Leeds
- Written by: Hugh Stuckey
- Directed by: Igor Auzins
- Starring: Johnny Pace; Harriet Pace; Mike Preston; Joe Martin; Noel Ferrier; Barry Creyton; Abigail; Stuart Wagstaff; Joy Chambers; Ugly Dave Gray
- Country of origin: Australia
- Original language: English

Production
- Producer: Howard Leeds
- Cinematography: Paul Onorato
- Running time: 75 mins
- Production company: Grundy Organisation

Original release
- Network: Network Ten
- Release: 8 July 1977

All at Sea is a 1977 Australian television film about a group of misfits on holiday on an island resort. It features the cast from The Celebrity Game.

== Premise ==
The story unfolds at Sea Island Resort in Queensland, where various guests and staff members embark on a series of adventures. The resort is managed by Mr. Blimer, assisted by John Bright. Blimer attempts to seduce his assistant, while Joy, a waitress, faces constant harassment from the guests as she pursues her own agenda. Meanwhile, employee Mike, initially interested in Maryanne, unexpectedly finds himself involved with the seemingly proper Miss Farrow. Arthur Pickering, a government minister, and Reverend Parslow, who is revealed to be a thief, add further twists to the tale.

== Cast ==
- Johnny Pace as John Bright
- Mike Preston as Mike
- Joe Martin as Joe, the barman
- Joy Chambers as Joy
- Harriet Pace (as "Harriet") as Miss Tuttle
- Noel Ferrier as Mr. Blimer
- Johnny Lockwood as Reverend Parslow/George Parsons
- Abigail as Denise Demour
- Stuart Wagstaff as Mr Arthur Pickering
- Cornelia Frances as Miss Farrow
- Sheila Kennelly as Mrs. Hand
- Ugly Dave Gray as Dick Goscomb
- Barry Creyton as Dennis Radley
- Megan Williams as Maryanne Hand
- Barbara Wyndon
- Jacqueline Kott
- Garry Keane
- Sheryl Sciro
- Ray Marshall
- Alan Penney

== Production ==
The film was a rare comedy from the Grundy Organisation. Reg Grundy claimed he was the one who had the idea of making an Australian TV movie in the vein of the Carry On films featuring the most popular comics in the country. He pitched the idea to Ian Holmes at Channel Ten who agreed to finance it. Grundy's wife Joy Chambers was then a panelist on The Celebrity Game on Channel Ten, and she also appeared in the cast.

Grundy assigned producing duties to Howard Leeds who had recently joined Grundys from Hollywood. "So here I had an American producing a show that was based entirely on English comedy with mostly Australian actors", Grundy later wrote. "It was a mishmash."

The Johnny Lockwood part was originally offered to John Meillon who turned it down.

The film was shot in Sydney over 12 days in February 1977 at locations including the Shore Motel at Artarmon, the Pasadena Hotel, Church Point, Sacha's Restaurant, the Newport Hotel and Newport.

Noel Ferrier called it "a nightmarish experience" because the film featured so many stand-up comics. "Being in a company of, or working with, one stand up comedian can be a taxing experienced; when surrounded by about eight of this remarkable breed the consequences can be singularly unfunny. There were more tantrums and bitchy scenes among this bunch of lovelies than you'd be likely to find in half a dozen ballet companies."

== Reception ==
Grundy wrote in his 2010 memoirs that the movie "got a twenty-one rating which these days would be a hit but back then was just okay. Howard [Leeds] had struck out." No TV station wanted to pick it up and turn it into a series.
