= Edith Arundel =

English author (1901–1993)

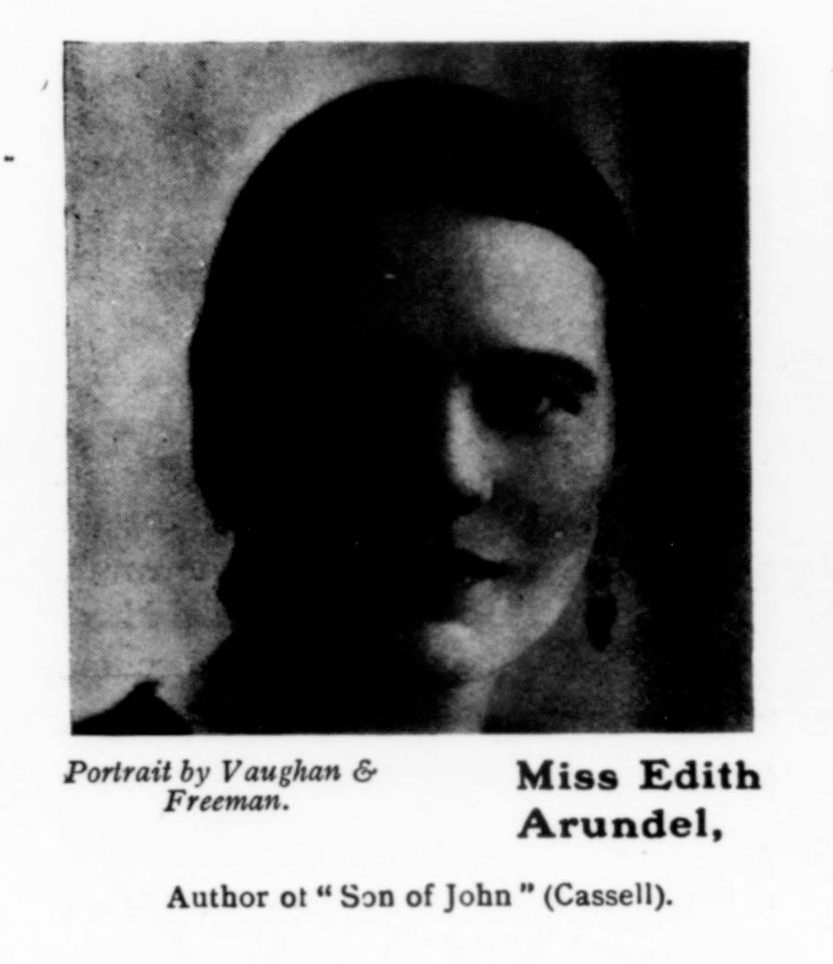
- Born: Edith Arundel; 12 June 1901; Fulham, London, England
- Died: 27 February 1993 (aged 91); Islington, London, England
- Citizenship: British
- Occupation: Novelist
- Spouse: Charles Burdon Buxton (m. 1944)
- Writing career
- Pen name: Anne Maybury, Katherine Troy
- Genres: Gothic fiction, Romantic fiction

Edith Buxton (née Arundel; 12 June 1901 – 27 February 1993) was an English writer of historical romances. She was a most industrious novelist and working under the names of Edith Arundel, Anne Maybury and Katherine Troy she published more than 80 novels.

== Publications ==
- Son Of John [1930]
- A Ghost Slips By [1932]
- The Best Love of All (ps: Anne MAYBURY) [1932]
- The Enchanted Kingdom (ps: Anne MAYBURY) [1932]
- The Love That Is Stronger Than Life (ps: Anne MAYBURY) [1932]
- Love Triumphant (ps: Anne MAYBURY) [1932]
- The Way Of Compassion (ps: Anne MAYBURY) [1933]
- The Second Winning (ps: Anne MAYBURY) [1933]
- Pilgrim On Wings [1934]
- Farewell To Dreams (ps: Anne MAYBURY) [1934]
- Harness The Winds (ps: Anne MAYBURY) [1934]
- Catch At A Rainbow (ps: Anne MAYBURY) [1935]
- Come Autumn - Come Winter (ps: Anne MAYBURY) [1935]
- The Garden Of Wishes (ps: Anne MAYBURY) [1935]
- The Starry Wood (ps: Anne MAYBURY) [1935]
- The Wondrous To-morrow (ps: Anne MAYBURY) [1936]
- Give Me Back My Dreams (ps: Anne MAYBURY) [1936]
- Lovely Destiny (ps: Anne MAYBURY) [1936]
- The Stars Grow Pale (ps: Anne MAYBURY) [1936]
- This Errant Heart (ps: Anne MAYBURY) [1937]
- This Lovely Hour (ps: Anne MAYBURY) [1937]
- I Dare Not Dream (ps: Anne MAYBURY) [1937]
- Oh, Darling Joy! (ps: Anne MAYBURY) [1937]
- Lady, It Is Spring! (ps: Anne MAYBURY) [1938]
- The Shadow Of My Loving (ps: Anne MAYBURY) [1938]
- They Dreamed Too Much (ps: Anne MAYBURY) [1938]
- Chained Eagle (ps: Anne MAYBURY) [1939]
- Gather Up The Years (ps: Anne MAYBURY) [1939]
- Return To Love (ps: Anne MAYBURY) [1939]
- The Barrier Between Us (ps: Anne MAYBURY) [1940]
- Dare To Marry (ps: Anne MAYBURY) [1940]
- I'll Walk With My Love (ps: Anne MAYBURY) [1940]
- Dangerous Living (ps: Anne MAYBURY) [1941]
- The Secret Of The Rose (ps: Anne MAYBURY) [1941]
- Journey Into Morning (ps: Anne MAYBURY) [1944]
- Can I Forget You? (ps: Anne MAYBURY) [1944]
- The Persistent Warrior [1945]
- The Valley Of Roses (ps: Anne MAYBURY) [1945]
- Catherine's Circle [1947]
- The Young Invader (ps: Anne MAYBURY) [1947]
- The Winds Of Spring (ps: Anne MAYBURY) [1948]
- Storm Heaven (ps: Anne MAYBURY) [1950]
- The Lonely Hunter [1951]
- First, The Dream (ps: Anne MAYBURY) [1951]
- Goodbye, My Love (ps: Anne MAYBURY) [1952]
- The Music Of Our House (ps: Anne MAYBURY) [1952]
- Her Name Was Eve (ps: Anne MAYBURY) [1953]
- The Heart Is Never Fair (ps: Anne MAYBURY) [1954]
- Prelude To Louise (ps: Anne MAYBURY) [1954]
- Follow Your Hearts (ps: Anne MAYBURY) [1955]
- The Other Juliet (ps: Anne MAYBURY) [1955]
- Forbidden (ps: Anne MAYBURY) [1956]
- Dear Lost Love (ps: Anne MAYBURY) [1957]
- Beloved Enemy (ps: Anne MAYBURY) [1957]
- The Stars Cannot Tell (ps: Anne MAYBURY) [1958]
- My Love Has A Secret (ps: Anne MAYBURY) [1958]
- The Gay Of Heart (ps: Anne MAYBURY) [1959]
- The Rebel Heart (ps: Anne MAYBURY) [1959]
- Shadow Of A Stranger (ps: Anne MAYBURY) [1960]
- Bridge To The Moon (ps: Anne MAYBURY) [1960]
- Stay Until Tomorrow (ps: Anne MAYBURY) [1961]
- Someone Waiting (ps: Katherine TROY) [1961]
- Whisper In The Dark (ps: Anne MAYBURY; also Katherine TROY) [1961]
- The Night My Enemy (ps: Anne MAYBURY) [1962]
- I Am Gabriella! (aka: Gabriella) (ps: Anne MAYBURY) [1962]
- Green Fire (ps: Anne MAYBURY) [1963]
- Enchanter's Nightshade (US: The Winds Of Night) (ps: Katherine TROY) [1963]
- The Brides of Bellenmore (aka: My Dearest Elizabeth) (ps: Anne MAYBURY) [1964]
- Falcon's Shadow (ps: Katherine TROY) [1964}
- Jessica (ps: Anne MAYBURY) [1965]
- The Pavilion At Monkshood (ps: Anne MAYBURY) [1965]
- The House of Fand (ps: Katherine TROY) [1966]

=== Film adaptations ===
The Persistent Warrior has been adapted in the film Green Fingers (1947) directed by John Harlow and starring Robert Beatty, Carol Raye and Nova Pilbeam.
