= Lisbon Story =

Lisbon Story can refer to:

- The Lisbon Story (musical), a 1943 West End musical by Harry Parr Davies and Harold Purcell
- Lisbon Story (1946 film), a British film directed by Paul L. Stein
- Lisbon Story (1994 film), a film directed by Wim Wenders
- Lisbon Story Centre, a museum located at Praça do Comércio, in Lisbon
