= Stuart Wagstaff =

English-born Australian entertainer (1925–2015)

Stuart Wagstaff AM
- Born: 13 February 1925; Great Durnford, Wiltshire, England
- Died: 10 March 2015 (aged 90); Greenwich, Sydney, New South Wales, Australia
- Occupations: Actor, music and stage manager
- Years active: 1945-2012

Stuart Wagstaff AM (13 February 1925 – 10 March 2015) was an English-born entertainer who was active in all genres of the industry in both his native United Kingdom and Australia and New Zealand including theatre, television and film, and music and stage management, over a career spanning over 60 years.

Wagstaff was well known to television audiences as The Beast on talk show Beauty and the Beast and his regular appearances on Blankety Blanks alongside Ugly Dave Gray, Carol Raye, Noelene Brown, and others.

== Early life ==
Wagstaff was born in Great Durnford, Wiltshire, England, and grew up on a farm with his parents and two older sisters. His father was very strict and emotionally abusive and he received little affection from his mother. His mother, however, frequently took him and his sisters to see plays and pantomime, generating an early interest in the arts.

In September 1940, at the insistence of his father, Wagstaff joined the Royal Navy as an apprentice aircraft mechanic in the Fleet Air Arm. He served at naval air stations and on aircraft carriers until the end of the war, but considered himself to be a poor mechanic. He frequently volunteered for ships' concert parties to further his interest in acting.

== Career ==
Wagstaff in the post-war years joined the Windsor repertory theatre as an assistant stage manager, occasionally taking small roles in plays. He then joined the Whitley repertory theatre in which he took part in up to 48 plays and four weeks of pantomime each year as well as a few West End, film and television appearances.

Wagstaff first came to Australia in 1958 to appear in the J. C. Williamson theatre production Not in the Book. In 1959, Williamson put him into the original My Fair Lady production, with which he was associated for the next four and a half years, the last two and half playing Professor Henry Higgins, through all the Australian and New Zealand capital cities. Following this, he took over the male lead in the stage musical The Sound of Music.

Wagstaff's early Australia television appearances consisted of commercials, and a role in the 1960 Crawford Productions play Seagulls Over Sorrento. Other dramatic appearances included three episodes of the drama series Whiplash (1960), the ABC play Concord Of Sweet Sounds (1963), and episodes of the ABC's historical serial The Hungry Ones (1963).

In 1964 he appeared as the host of the Channel 7 variety show Studio 'A' and in 1965 he replaced the ailing Eric Baume as the "Beast" on the Channel 7 daytime show, Beauty and the Beast. This production established him as one of Australia's firm television favourites. During this two-and-a-half year period with Beauty and the Beast, he also appeared in leading roles in several stage productions including There's a Girl in My Soup, Present Laughter, Private Lives, several theatre restaurant revues, and a 1966 episode of the TV drama series Homicide. In 1965, he presented ATN-7's news program The Wagstaff Report.

In 1968 he became host of a major Tonight show on the Seven Network. Later that year he appeared as a guest on the inaugural Channel Seven Perth Telethon. Wagstaff would later become closely associated with Telethon, with the entertainer returning for 35 subsequent Telethons, making his last appearance via video in 2009.

Wagstaff later moved to the Nine Network to become one of the regular hosts of In Melbourne Tonight. During the following three years he hosted several shows on the Nine Network, including The Sound of Music and a regular late night interview show.

=== Impact of smoking advertising on his career ===
Wagstaff's suave style led to his advertising Benson & Hedges, a brand of British cigarettes, with the tagline "When only the best will do ... and isn't that all the time?". In a 2003 interview published in The Age, journalist Chris Beck commented:

"By his own account he is a workman-like actor who has been largely ignored for film and television roles because, he says, "I did 116 Benson and Hedges commercials and I was very heavily identified. It was irritating because I love movies." People often ask me if I have any regrets about doing those commercials because I think a lot of people—young, impressionable people—might have taken up smoking as a result. And I suppose I have regrets about that. But...we didn't know then. So, I can't have regrets about something I didn't know.

— Wagstaff, interviewed in The Age, 23 January 2003

The Non Smokers' Movement of Australia website (issue 18, May–June 1997) wrote in "Smoking Frontman Expresses Late Regrets":

Stuart Wagstaff, who made a career from 116 Benson and Hedges commercials spanning two decades has disclosed he regretted his lucrative liaison with the tobacco industry. He is quoted as saying, "One thing that concerns me deeply in the light of what we know today is that I might have been instrumental in people starting smoking. The company policy was that the ads were intended to make people who accept smoking change brands but, of course, people must have indeed have started as a result of it. And that I regret. [...] Cigarettes [sic] advertising on TV was banned in Australia in September 1976, but in April 1997 Wagstaff revealed that the company kept paying him "for nothing" until 1993–17 years later. "They believed whenever a group of people saw me they thought, subliminally, Benson & Hedges. So they kept me on the payroll. I didn't argue."

=== Later career and death ===
After a three-year stint in Hollywood, working in film and television, Wagstaff returned to Australia in 1975 and was immediately kept busy with TV appearances all over the country, including being a regular panellist on Channel 9's Celebrity Squares, then two years as permanent panellist on the 0-10 Network's Blankety Blanks, plus seven seasons as the host/presenter on the ABC's Stuart Wagstaff's World Playhouse.

Besides television, Wagstaff remained active in his first love, the theatre. In late 1979 he appeared again as Professor Higgins in My Fair Lady and a successful national tour followed in which he was also a co-producer. About this time he also produced Sydney and Melbourne seasons of the American stage comedy Father's Day. In 1981 he toured as the narrator in the successful Rocky Horror Show starring Daniel Abineri, and repeated this with a second tour a few years later which featured Russell Crowe. In 1982 Wagstaff appeared in a leading role in the play Noises Off which had a successful national tour. In 1983 he played the lead in Blithe Spirit at Marian Street Theatre in Sydney and then went on to host the Midday Movie and Friday Night Movies on the Seven Network for two years.

Wagstaff's television guest roles in the 1990s included appearances in G.P., Rafferty's Rules, A Country Practice and All Saints. He often appeared on The Midday Show and Good Morning Australia, and continued to appear on the Perth Telethon. The late 1980s and the 1990s saw him on stage with Sydney seasons and subsequent tours of Noises Off, Black Comedy, The Winslow Boy, Lend Me A Tenor and Gershwin's musical Crazy For You. He also appeared in the role of Old Cookson in the theatrical production of Pan at the Capitol Theatre, Sydney. Cameron Mackintosh's production of Oliver!, had Wagstaff returning to the stage in the role of Mr. Brownlow.

Wagstaff died from complications associated with pulmonary fibrosis, aged 90, on 10 March 2015.

== Honours ==
On 26 January 1998, Wagstaff was appointed a Member of the Order of Australia (AM) for service to the community, particularly through the Channel Seven Perth Telethon by raising funds for charities that support children's medical research.

In March 2023, Wagstaff was commemorated with a new street name 'Wagstaff Way' in the residential subdivision of the former TVW studios site in Dianella, Western Australia due to his direct personal contribution to the Channel 7 Perth Telethon. The new road was completed and open in August 2023.

== Filmography ==
=== Film ===
- A Night to Remember (1958) as Titanic Steward (uncredited)
- Seagulls Over Sorrento (1960, TV movie)
- Concord of Sweet Sounds (1963, TV play) as Alexander Croyston
- Sunstruck (1972) as Announcer
- For Pete's Sake (1974) - Man in Chandelier Store (aka July Pork Bellies)
- Is There Anybody There? (1975, TV movie) as Lars Dickinson
- All at Sea (1977, TV movie) as Mr. Arthur Pickering
- Bit Part (1978, TV movie) as Bernard
- The Journalist (1979) as Courtney Lewers

=== Television ===
- Whiplash (1961) as Jimmy Quicksilver (3 episodes)
- The Hungry Ones (1963)
- Studio A (1964) as Host
- The Wagstaff Report (1965) as Presenter
- Homicide (1966) as Stanley Copeland (episode: "Death Us Do Part")
- Beauty and the Beast (1966-68) as Presenter ('The Beast')
- Tonight Show (1968) as Host
- In Melbourne Tonight (1970) as Host
- The Partridge Family (1973) as Head Waiter (episode: "The Last of Howard")
- Temperatures Rising (1974) as Thornton (episode: "Healer Man")
- Celebrity Squares (1975) as Panellist
- Name That Tune (1975) as Himself
- Blankety Blanks (1977) as Panelist
- The Dick Emery Show in Australia (1977) as Various Characters
- Stuart Wagstaff's World Playhouse (1977-83) as Presenter
- G.P. (1990s) as guest role
- Rafferty's Rules (1990s) as guest role
- A Country Practice (1990s) as guest role
- The Midday Show (1990s) as regular guest
- Good Morning Australia (1990s) as regular guest
- Channel Seven Perth Telethon (1968- 2009) as regular guest
- All Saints (1998) as Reg Howard (episode: "Revelations")
- Bullpitt! (1998) as Tyrone Wilde (episode: "One Hump or Two?")
- Graham Kennedy: Farewell to the King (2005) as himself
