= Lilacs in the Spring =

1954 British film by Herbert Wilcox

- 1954 Theatrical Poster
- Directed by: Herbert Wilcox
- Based on: The Glorious Days by Harold Purcell and Robert Nesbitt
- Produced by: Herbert Wilcox
- Starring: Errol Flynn; Anna Neagle; David Farrar; Kathleen Harrison
- Cinematography: Max Greene
- Edited by: Reginald Beck
- Music by: Robert Farnon
- Production company: Everest Pictures
- Distributed by: Republic Pictures; United Artists (US)
- Release date: 21 December 1954
- Running time: 94 minutes
- Country: United Kingdom
- Language: English
- Budget: £297,746

Lilacs in the Spring is a 1954 British musical film directed by Herbert Wilcox and starring Anna Neagle, Errol Flynn and David Farrar. The film was made at Elstree Studios with sets designed by the art director William C. Andrews. Shot in Trucolor it was distributed in Britain by Republic Pictures. It was the first of two films Neagle and Flynn made together, the other being King's Rhapsody. It was released in the United States as Let's Make Up.

The script was based on the stage musical The Glorious Days written by Harold Purcell and Robert Nesbitt, which had been a big success for Neagle, running for two years and 467 performances. It referenced several earlier hits of Neagle, including Nell Gwynn (1934) and Victoria the Great (1937).

== Plot ==
A young actress, Carole Beaumont, is wooed by actor-producer Charles King but she is unsure how she feels about him. During an air raid in the Blitz, a bomb explosion rocks the cafe and Carole is knocked unconscious. In her confused state, fantasies flash through her mind, and she seems to become Nell Gwyn of Old Drury, with Charles King looking very much like King Charles.

Recovering, she is advised by her doctor to take a rest in the country and there another beau, Albert Gutman, prompts his grandmother, Lady Drayton (Helen Haye), to invite Carole to their family home at Windsor. She accepts and telephones Charles but hangs up when his phone is answered by a female voice.

Looking out on Windsor Castle, she sees herself as the young Queen Victoria and Albert as Prince Albert. Influenced by her day-dream, she accepts Albert's proposal. Charles arrives to tell her that all arrangements are made for her to leave with him and the company for Burma, but she refuses saying she will never marry an actor.

Barmaid Kate tells Charles why Carole feels the way she does about actors: Carole's mother, Lillian Grey, was with a touring show in 1913 when the handsome star John Beaumont elevated her from the chorus to be his partner in his first West End show. They were successful, fell in love, and were married. However, the war soon took Beau off to Flanders and Lillian was left to become a great star on her own. Carole was born in wartime but saw little of her busy mother.

== Cast ==
- Anna Neagle as Carole Beaumont/Lillian Grey/Queen Victoria/Nell Gwyn
- Errol Flynn as John Beaumont
- David Farrar as Charles King/King Charles II
- Kathleen Harrison as Kate
- Peter Graves as Albert Gutman/Prince Albert
- Helen Haye as Lady Drayton
- Scott Sanders as Old George
- Alma Taylor as Woman in theater audience
- Hetty King as Woman in theater audience
- Alan Gifford as Hollywood director
- Jennifer Mitchell as Young Carole
- Gillian Harrison as Carole as child
- George Margo as Reporter
- Gerard Heinz as Waiter at Romano's
- Sam Kydd as Actor in Beaumont Film
- George Benson as Theatre Royal manager
- Stephen Boyd as Beaumont's Poolside Companion
- Sean Connery as Extra in crowd scene

== Production ==
The film was made by Everest Pictures, a new production company from producer-director Herbert Wilcox. Wilcox had just made three films in collaboration with Republic Pictures, and hoped for them to finance films of two Ivor Novello musicals he had purchased. When this did not happen, he was forced to obtain finance from British Lion. Neagle and Wilcox guaranteed a loan of £75,000 to make the film. This later contributed to Wilcox's bankruptcy when the films failed.

Errol Flynn agreed to make the film to pay off the debts he incurred due to his abandoned William Tell project, The Story of William Tell.

The movie was shot at Elstree Studios near London in July 1954. Neagle enjoyed working with her co-star:

I love naturalness and simplicity and Errol Flynn has this to a charming degree. He has made so many friends on this picture with his sense of fun and his conscientiousness and he has been enormously co-operative. It's so unfair to judge people by what you read or hear and I mst confess I was not prepared to find him such a hard worker.

Flynn used his real singing voice. It was the feature film debut of Sean Connery.

== Reception ==
United States Let's Make Up Theatrical Poster

The film was not a success at the box office, in Britain or the United States.

=== Critical response ===
Dilys Powell of the Sunday Times said the film's "pleasures are innocuous and domesticated." C. A. Lejeune wrote that Flynn and Neagle "quietly manage a parody of the period that is not without distinction."

The critic for the Los Angeles Times said "I could discover little reason for its being made".

Filmink magazine called it "a mess – fascinating, but a mess."

=== Other Flynn-Wilcox collaborations ===
Wilcox announced he had signed Flynn to make six films over two years. (Another figure quoted was £12,000 for three films over 12 months.) Among the proposed projects were a version of Somerset Maugham's Caesar's Wife and a movie about Napoleon's escape from Elba, with Flynn to play an Irish soldier of fortune, but no film resulted.
