= Manning Sherwin =

American composer (1902–1974)

Manning Sherwin (January 4, 1902 – July 26, 1974) was an American composer. Born in Philadelphia, Sherwin attended Columbia University before embarking upon a long career in musical theatre and films.

His most enduring composition is the music for "A Nightingale Sang in Berkeley Square", lyrics by Eric Maschwitz, written for New Faces in 1940. Another wartime success, published in 1939, was "Who's Taking You Home Tonight?", with lyrics by Tommie Connor.

He settled in Britain in 1938, and contributed to George Posford's Magyar Melody. His musical Sitting Pretty, whose main hit was the duet "I'll Take a Little Time", was pulled early due to the outbreak of war, and he countered with Get A Load of This which achieved 698 West End performances (1941-3), Something in the Air (1943-4) (336 performances, plus 163 more in 1944-5), and Under the Counter (665 perfs in 1945-7). During the war he worked for British cinema, providing the music for hit wartime comedy features such as Miss London.

His last successful musicals were The Kid from Stratford (1948-9: 235 performances) and Her Excellency (1949) (jointly composed with Posford, whose real name was Benjamin George Ashwell, perfs 252). A number of his songs also featured in British musical films of the period.

Sherwin died in Los Angeles. He was buried in Grand View Memorial Park Cemetery in Glendale, California.
