= Joy Chambers =

Australian actress, author, poet and businesswoman (1947–2023)

- Born: Carolyn Joy Chambers; 1947; Ipswich, Queensland, Australia
- Died: 17 September 2023 (aged 76); Queensland, Australia
- Occupations: Actress; author; poet; businesswoman
- Years active: 1965–2010
- Known for: The Restless Years (TV series) as Rita Merrick; The Young Doctors (TV series) as Dr. Robyn Porter; Neighbours (TV series) as Rosemary Daniels
- Spouse: Reg Grundy (m. 1971; died 2016)
- Website: www.joychambers.com

Carolyn Joy Chambers-Grundy (née Chambers; 1947 – 17 September 2023) was an Australian actress, author, poet and businesswoman. As the wife of multimillionaire television tycoon Reg Grundy, she wrote for, worked as a production assistant on and appeared in his productions, and served on the board of Grundys Worldwide; subsequently with her husband, she formed media investment company "RG Capital Holdings", and pursued a career as a writer of historical novels.

== Biography ==
=== Early career ===
Chambers was named the inaugural Miss Surf Girl in 1965 by the Queensland Surf Life Saving Club and was a model when she was spotted by her future producer husband Reg, who placed her as a panellist on the Australian version of his game show I've Got A Secret in which she featured over a 10-year tenure and won two Logie Awards in 1969 and 1970 as Most Popular Female Personality in Queensland. She went on to appear in numerous other Grundy's game shows including Everybody's Talking, The Celebrity Game and Blankety Blanks.

=== Television soap opera ===
Chambers-Grundy is known for several television soap opera roles including Rita Merrick in The Restless Years, Dr Robyn Porter in The Young Doctors, and Rosemary Daniels in Neighbours. Chambers first played Rosemary, businesswoman and adopted daughter of Anne Haddy's character Helen Daniels, as a guest appearance in 1986 and then played the character on a recurring basis until 2010. Chambers made a brief return to the show in 2005, after line producer Linda Walker emailed her asking if she would return for the 20th anniversary celebrations. She shot her scenes in April on a visit to Melbourne. In May 2010, it was announced that Chambers would again be reprising the role of Rosemary. Chambers also appeared in film All at Sea.

=== Career as writer ===
Chambers had a keen interest in poetry and literature which began in childhood, with her father encouraging her deep love of the English word. Chambers was an author of historical novels. She was also the International Patron of the Ipswich Poetry Feast.

== Personal life and death ==
Chambers was the second wife of television media mogul Reg Grundy from 1971 until his death in 2016. The couple lived in Bermuda. Chambers died in Queensland, Australia on 17 September 2023, at the age of 76.

== Filmography ==
Television

Year	Title	Role	Notes
1967-1972	I've Got A Secret	Herself - Regular Guest	TV series, 1 episode
1968	Everybody's Talking	Herself - Regular panelist	TV series
1969	The 11th Annual TV Week Logie Awards	Herself	TV special
1970	The 12th Annual TV Week Logie Awards	Herself	TV special
1974	Barry McKenzie: Ogre Or Ocker	Herself	TV special
1976–1977	The Celebrity Game	Herself – Regular Panelist	TV series
1977–1978	Graham Kennedy's Blankety Blanks	Herself – Panelist	TV series
1977	All at Sea	Joy	TV movie
1977–1979	The Restless Years	Rita Merrick	TV series, 101 episodes
1981–1982	The Young Doctors	Robyn Porter	TV series
1981	Channel Nine Celebrates: 25 Years Of Television	Herself in audience with Reg Grundy	TV special
1986–1987, 1989–1991, 1993–1998, 2005, 2010	Neighbours	Rosemary Daniels	TV series, 88 episodes
1993, 1996, 2000, 2003	Good Morning Australia	Herself – Guest	TV series, 4 episodes
2005, 2010	A Current Affair	Herself & Reg Grundy	TV series
2010	Sunrise	Herself - Guest	TV series, 1 episode
2010	Ten News	Herself & Reg Grundy	TV series, 1 episode
2010	Seven News	Herself & Reg Grundy	TV series, 1 episode
2010	Nine News	Herself & Reg Grundy	TV series, 1 episode
2010	Sky News	Herself & Reg Grundy	TV series, 1 episode
2010	Today Tonight	Herself & Reg Grundy	TV series, 1 episode
2010	ABC News	Herself & Reg Grundy	TV series, 1 episode
2010, 2016	A Current Affair	Herself & Reg Grundy	TV series
2016	A Current Affair	Herself	TV series, 1 episode
2017	Sunrise	Herself - Archive clips	TV series, 1 episode

=== Net worth ===
Year	Financial Review Rich List		Forbes Australia's 50 Richest	
Year	Rank	Net worth (A$)	Rank	Net worth (US$)
2019	108 ▲	$871 million ▲		
2020	114 ▼	$871 million		
2021	122 ▼	$871 million		
2022	n/a	unlisted		
2023	156 ▲	$901 million ▲		

Legend
Icon	Description
Steady	Has not changed from the previous year
▲	Has increased from the previous year
▼	Has decreased from the previous year

== Bibliography ==
- Mayfield (1993). ISBN 0747238634
- My Zulu, Myself (1995). ISBN 0747248591
- Vale Valhalla (2000). ISBN 0747260885
- None But the Brave (2003). ISBN 0755305213
- For Freedom (2007). ISBN 0755309405
- The Great Deception (2012). ISBN 0755352645
