= Lisbon Story (1946 film) =

- Directed by: Paul L. Stein
- Screenplay by: Jack Whittingham
- Based on: play with music The Lisbon Story by Harry Parr Davies and Harold Purcell
- Produced by: Louis H. Jackson
- Cinematography: Gerald Moss
- Edited by: Douglas Myers
- Music by: Hans May
- Production company: British National Films
- Distributed by: Anglo-American Film Corporation (UK)
- Release date: 20 May 1946 (UK)
- Running time: 100 minutes
- Country: United Kingdom
- Language: English

Lisbon Story is a 1946 British musical thriller film directed by Paul L. Stein and starring Patricia Burke, David Farrar, Walter Rilla and Austin Trevor. It was written by Jack Whittingham based on the musical The Lisbon Story by Harold Purcell and Harry Parr Davies that ran at The Hippodrome, London, in 1943.

== Synopsis ==
Cabaret singer Gabrelle Girard and British intelligence officer David Warren travel to Berlin to rescue an atomic scientist being held there.

== Cast ==
- Patricia Burke as Gabrielle Girard
- David Farrar as David Warren
- Walter Rilla as Karl von Schriner
- Lawrence O'Madden as Michael O'Rourke
- Austin Trevor as Major Lutzen
- Paul Bonifas as Stephan Corelle
- Ralph Truman as Police Commissionaire
- Joan Seton as Lisette
- Harry Welchman as George Duncan
- Martin Walker as journalist
- Noele Gordon as Panache
- Esmé Percy as Mariot
- Allan Jeayes as Dr. Cartier
- John Ruddock as Pierre Sargon
- Uriel Porter as Joe
- Richard Tauber singing "Pedro the Fisherman" and other numbers

== Reception ==
The Monthly Film Bulletin wrote: "David Farrar is an attractive and sincere actor who here has to portray the laconic Englishman instead of following up the indications of good acting which he gave in For Those in Peril. The whole affair is geared to showmanship (songs, dresses, sets, cliche comedy, cliche melodrama) and will greatly shock any visitor from countries which have suffered actual Occupation."

The Daily Film Renter wrote: "Strong points are excellent tunes, well sung, coupled with dramatic espionage story, and considerable title value. Patricia Burke plays her original role with composure and polish; and Richard Tauber gives a fresh lease of life to 'Pedro the Fisherman.' Director has handled the transcription with assurance, and exhibitors can count on the results for a solid clean-up at the box-office. Something for everybody is offered in this potent combination of music, thrills and romance, packed with incident, and well acted by a competent team."

Variety wrote: "This is the best musical yet to be turned out by a British studio. ... All the music, composed by Harry Parr Davies, is well above the usual filmusical [sic] standard. Harold Purcell's lyrics are not less outstanding, and an exceptionally well-trained chorus helps."
