= Reg Grundy =

Australian businessman (1923–2016)

Reg Grundy AC OBE
- Grundy on A Current Affair in 2010
- Born: Reginald Roy Grundy; 4 August 1923; Sydney, New South Wales, Australia
- Died: 6 May 2016 (aged 92); Tucker's Town, Bermuda
- Education: University of Queensland
- Occupation: Media mogul
- Years active: 1941–2016
- Spouses: Patricia Lola C Powell (m. 1954, divorced); Joy Chambers (m. 1971)

Reginald Roy Grundy AC, OBE (4 August 1923 – 6 May 2016) was an Australian entrepreneur and media mogul, best known for his numerous television productions. He was the producer of various Australian game shows, such as Blankety Blanks (based on a Mark Goodson–Bill Todman production, Match Game) and Wheel of Fortune (based on the US Merv Griffin production of the same name) before later diversifying into soap operas and serials including Prisoner, The Young Doctors, Sons and Daughters and Neighbours, the last of which was inducted into the Logie Hall of Fame in 2005.

== Early life ==
Reginald Roy Grundy was born on 4 August 1923 in Sydney, New South Wales, to Roy Grundy and Lillian Lees. Grundy served in the Australian Army during World War II as a Sergeant stationed in Sydney in the 1 Motor Division Signals. He enlisted in December 1941 and was discharged in August 1946.

== Career ==
Grundy started his media career as a boxing and general sports commentator for the Sydney radio station 2SM in 1947. While he was working at 2CH Sydney in 1957, Grundy conceived and hosted the Wheel of Fortune game show on radio, which moved to Channel Nine two years later. He founded his own production company Reg Grundy Enterprises in 1960, and began producing game shows for the Australian and overseas market, before eventually branching out into drama in 1973. In 1977, he co-produced ABBA: The Movie.

The company produced several successful television soap operas and drama series, including Class of '74, The Restless Years, The Young Doctors, Prisoner, Glenview High, Sons and Daughters and Neighbours. Grundy was the first person to sell an Australian drama to America (Prisoner) and the first to sell an Australian quiz show to the UK (Going for Gold). He subsequently started the US-based company Reg Grundy Productions, which produced the 1980s NBC daytime game shows Sale of the Century and Scrabble, as well as Time Machine for NBC, Bruce Forsyth's Hot Streak for ABC, and Scattergories (also for NBC).

The Grundy Organisation was ultimately owned by Grundy Worldwide Ltd, based in the tax haven of Bermuda. In 1995, he sold the Grundy Organisation to the media and publishing company Pearson PLC, now Fremantle, for $386 million. Grundy owned the private media investment company RG Capital, which had shares in several FM radio stations. Grundy also had shares in WAM Capital, Austereo, Argus Solutions and Photon Group.

== Photography ==
Grundy had a lifelong passion for wildlife photography. He published a book of photographs in 2005, The Wildlife of Reg Grundy. In June 2009, an exhibition of photographs of Bermuda Longtail birds by Grundy, "Longtails: The Bermuda Dream", opened in The Rick Faries Gallery at the Masterworks Museum of Bermuda Art.

== Personal life ==
Grundy married Patricia Lola Powell in 1954 and they had a daughter, Kim. After Grundy and Powell divorced, he married the actress and author Joy Chambers in 1971. The couple met at a television audition in the 1960s. Chambers was 18 and Grundy was in his forties. They renewed their vows several times. Grundy and Chambers moved to Bermuda in 1982. They remained married until his death; Chambers died on 17 September 2023, aged 76.

In 2015, the Australian Financial Review listed Grundy as Australia's 59th-richest individual, with an estimated wealth of $809 million. Grundy published an eponymous autobiography in 2010. He was the owner of a yacht named Boadicea, which was sold in 2009.

== Death ==
Grundy died on 6 May 2016 at his Bermuda home, with his family by his side. No cause was given. After his death was announced, many tributes were paid to Grundy. Presenter Andrew Denton commented, "I'm sure the record will show that more Australians have watched more hours of Reg Grundy television than that of any other individual." While actress Jackie Woodburne, who worked on Grundy productions Neighbours, Prisoner and The Young Doctors, stated that "Reg was a true groundbreaker in Australian television in the [']70s and [']80s, and beyond[,] in light entertainment and drama."

Tracy Grimshaw, who interviewed Grundy in 2010, said: "RG was a pioneer in game shows, in drama, in soapies. He was a star-maker. But he totally rejected the limelight. He only gave one television interview in his life, and I was privileged and fascinated to be the one who spoke with him." Grimshaw's interview with Grundy was rebroadcast during the 9 May edition of A Current Affair. Ian Hogg, whose company bought Grundy Organisation, announced that FremantleMedia were thinking of a permanent way to honour Grundy.

== Honours ==
Grundy was appointed an Officer of the Order of the British Empire in the New Years Honours of 1983. He was appointed a Companion of the Order of Australia in the Queen's Birthday Honours of 2008. He received the International Emmy Founders Award in 1996 and the AFI Raymond Longford Award in 2010. In July 2004, he was awarded an Honorary Doctorate of Philosophy by the University of Queensland.

== In popular culture ==
Colloquially, in Australia, "Reg Grundies", "Grundies" or "Reggies", is rhyming slang for "undies" (underpants).

== Bibliography ==
- The Wildlife of Reg Grundy (2005, Grundy Foundation) ISBN 9781894916363
- Mother and Child: Wildlife Photography (2015, Glitterati Incorporated) ISBN 9780990380870
- Reg Grundy (2010, Allen & Unwin) ISBN 9781742662534
