= Her Excellency (musical) =

1949 musical

- Written by: Archie Menzies; Max Kester
- Music by: Manning Sherwin; Harold Purcell
- Genre: Musical

Premiere
- Date premiered: 19 April 1949
- Place premiered: Alhambra Theatre, Glasgow

Her Excellency is a musical comedy composed by Manning Sherwin and Harold Purcell from a book by Archie Menzies and Max Kester. A couple of the songs were composed by Harry Parr-Davies. The story takes place entirely in the British Embassy in the fictional San Barcellos.

After premiering at the Alhambra Theatre, Glasgow, the show transferred to London's West End enjoying a run of 252 performances between 22 June 1949 and 28 January 1950, initially at the London Hippodrome before switching to the Saville Theatre. It was written as a starring vehicle for Cicely Courtneidge and produced by her husband Jack Hulbert. The cast also included Patrick Barr, Austin Trevor, Thorley Walters, Billy Dainty and Tucker McGuire.

== Bibliography ==
- Wearing, J.P. The London Stage 1940-1949: A Calendar of Productions, Performers, and Personnel. Rowman & Littlefield, 2014.
