= The Love Racket (musical) =

The Love Racket is a musical comedy by Stanley Lupino with music by Noel Gay and lyrics by Frank Eyton, Barbara Gordon and Basil Thomas, and Leslie Gibbs, with additional dialogue by Arty Ash and additional numbers by Hubert Gregg and Freddie Bretherton.

The original production was as a star vehicle for Arthur Askey and also featured Roy Royston and Carol Raye. After a season at the Opera House Manchester, it opened in the West End at the Victoria Palace Theatre in October 1943. It moved to the Princes Theatre in April 1944 before closing in July 1944.
