= Metalstorm: The Destruction of Jared-Syn =

1983 film by Charles Band

- Original movie poster
- Directed by: Charles Band
- Written by: Alan J. Adler
- Produced by: Charles Band; Albert Band; Alan J. Adler
- Starring: Jeffrey Byron; Mike Preston; Tim Thomerson; Kelly Preston; Richard Moll
- Cinematography: Mac Ahlberg
- Edited by: Brad Arensman
- Music by: Richard Band
- Production company: Albert Band International Productions
- Distributed by: Universal Pictures (United States and Canada); Arista Films (International)
- Release date: August 19, 1983
- Running time: 84 minutes
- Country: United States
- Language: English
- Budget: $2.5 million
- Box office: $5.3 million

Metalstorm: The Destruction of Jared-Syn is a 1983 science fiction film starring Jeffrey Byron, Michael Preston, Tim Thomerson, Kelly Preston and Richard Moll. It was directed and produced by Charles Band. The story is a space-age Western which combines themes of esoteric sorcery and high technology. Metalstorm was filmed in 3D.

The movie portrays the story of a space ranger named Dogen (played by Jeffrey Byron), who is in search of an intergalactic criminal with supernatural powers named Jared-Syn (played by Michael Preston). He has tracked this individual to a desert planet called Lemuria. The planet's human population lives in scattered mining towns, gathering valuable crystals which seem to be the basis for their technology and economy. Syn has posed as the leader of a strange group of nomadic humanoids called the "One Eyes" – so named because they symbolically gouge out one of their eyes – who are descendants of a vanished culture called the Cyclopians. The territorial nomads have begun a holy war to drive the human miners from their lands. Syn has instigated this crusade, but Dogen knows that Syn's plan is really to enslave them all and seeks to stop him at all cost. Syn equips his nomads with strange red crystals that drain the life out of touched victims. Dogen searches Lemuria's wastelands for Syn's camp, traveling in an armored vehicle.

== Plot ==
A "skybike", a one-man, open-cockpit flying machine, attacks Dogen. Dogen shoots it down and finds one of Syn's crystals on the pilot's body. Carved into the crystal is a symbol of a dead tree. Dogen finds a murdered prospector, whose young daughter Dhyana saw him killed by Baal, Jared Syn's half-cyborg son. Baal sprayed the man with a green liquid that caused a nightmare dream-state, in which Syn appeared and executed him with a crystal. Dogen convinces Dhyana to help him find Syn.

Dhyana takes Dogen to Zax, who identifies the crystal as a lifeforce storage device. Dhyana tells them about the ancient Cyclopians who once used such devices and says the only power against it is a magic mask located in their lost city. Zax affirms this and directs Dogen to find a prospector named Rhodes in the nearby mining town of Zhor.

Dogen and Dhyana are blocked by vehicles driven by nomads commanded by Baal, who sprays Dogen with the green liquid, paralyzing him. Dhyana drives them off and cares for Dogen, who in the dream world finds Syn and Baal looming over him. Syn fails to pull Dogen away from Dhyana: their will is too strong. Dogen awakes, but Dhyana is suddenly teleported away. A summoned monster appears in her place and fires electric bolts at him. Dhyana simultaneously faces Syn in his lair. Dogen shorts-out the creature, and it vanishes.

Dogen arrives in Zhor and finds Rhodes, a washed-up soldier, in a bar. Rhodes denies the lost city's existence and refuses to get involved. Dogen leaves and comes upon a group of miners beating a captured nomad soldier. Dogen assists him, and the miners turn hostile. Dogen is out-gunned until Rhodes helps him defeat the miners.

Rhodes reluctantly agrees to help Dogen. Deep into Cyclopian territory, Dogen locates a large statue with a single eye and finds the crystal mask. Suddenly attacked by snake-like creatures, they escape, until they are accosted by a group of nomad warriors. Their leader, Hurok, grabs the mask from Dogen and accuses them of trespassing – a capital crime. Rhodes cites nomad law that a warrior can fight for his freedom, so Dogen duels Hurok. When Dogen spares his life, Hurok accepts Dogen as a friend and frees him.

Syn takes Dhyana before a massive crystal and forces her to touch it. Syn says the crystal is powered by captured souls, including that of her father. Dhyana, disgusted, says her warrior will come for her. Elsewhere, Dogen and Rhodes assault Baal's encampment, and a chase ensues. After evading them, Dogen wears the mask and finds himself in the dream world with a burning tree. In his hand he finds an axe and hacks into the tree. The tree moans like the crystal in Syn's camp and trickles a stream of blood. Dogen removes the mask and returns to Rhodes. Baal suddenly attacks, extending his robotic arm to spray Dogen, but Rhodes pushes him out of the way and is knocked out. Dogen, struggling with Baal, rips the robotic limb from his shoulder. Baal flees, and Dogen tracks the green fluid to Syn's camp. He sees the nomads gathered around Syn, and Hurok greets him.

Syn denounces Dogen as an enemy, but Dogen says he has only come for Syn. Hurok refuses to kill Dogen and demands that he be allowed to speak. Dogen says Syn is a liar who wants to enslave them. When the crowd turns hostile to Syn, he activates the crystal, which stuns the crowd. Syn fires blasts at Dogen, but he deflects them with the mask. Baal grabs the mask and it shatters on the ground. Hurok kills Baal, and Syn teleports away. Dogen jumps onto a skybike and chases Syn into the desert, but Syn escapes through an energy portal.

Dogen returns to the nomad camp, finding Dhyana safe with Hurok. Dogen promises to fight Syn if he returns and destroys Syn's soul crystal. Dogen and Dhyana leave the camp on foot but soon encounter Rhodes in Dogen's truck. He picks them up and takes them into town.

== Cast ==
- Jeffrey Byron as Dogen
- Michael Preston as Jared-Syn
- Tim Thomerson as Rhodes
- Kelly Preston as Dhyana
- Richard Moll as Hurok
- R. David Smith as Baal
- Larry Pennel as Aix
- Marty Zagon as Zax
- Mickey Fox as Annie "Poker Annie"
- Annabelle Larsen as Siren
- Winston Jones as Chimera
- William Jones as Baal's Lieutenant

== Production ==
Producer Charles Band and Alan J. Adler initially only sought to produce another 3D film on the level of their previous film Parasite, but as they began assembling the crew and discussing concepts this led to an increase in the scope and budget with both Band and Adler working for deferred pay instead of upfront salaries. Band and Adler described the film as Western of the "Cowboys and Indians" variety with Adler incorporating a large amount of Native American mythology. Adler further incorporating elements from the legend of Atlantis in the hopes he could develop those elements in a potential sequel for a planned trilogy. Plans for a trilogy were cancelled as although grosses saw a modest return on investment, they were deemed insignificant to justify further films.

=== Filming ===
Principal photography began in February 1982 for a period of seven weeks in Simi Valley, California and Vasquez Rocks. Mac Ahlberg who had shot Parasite returned to shoot Metalstorm.

== Home media ==
Universal released the DVD of the movie on August 3, 2010. On the DVD, the opening credit sequence is presented in the 2.35:1 "widescreen" aspect ratio, the original format for the entire 3D film, but after the credits the rest of the film is presented 1.33:1 "pan & scan" transfer for television. The cover of the DVD also features more simplistic-looking artwork rather than the original theatrical poster. Shout! Factory released the film on 2D and 3D Blu-ray on September 13, 2016, under their horror/science fiction/cult label Scream Factory.

== Notes ==
- Actors Jeffrey Byron and Richard Moll, as well as some of the road-warrior vehicles used in this movie, are seen once again in Charles Band's cult science fiction/fantasy movie The Dungeonmaster (1985).
- Richard Moll had originally shaved his head for his role in this movie. The producers of Night Court liked the look for Moll, so he continued shaving his head for the show.
- The movie's tagline "It's High Noon at the End of the Universe." was also used as the tagline for the Full Moon Entertainment production Oblivion 2: Backlash (1996).
- There is a tip of the hat to the film in the 2024 film The Fall Guy in which the 'movie within a movie' is titled Metalstorm and shares a similar tagline.

== Reception ==
The film earned negative reviews from critics. On review aggregator website Rotten Tomatoes, there is no critics' score for the film, as it only has three critics' reviews registered, though all of them are labeled 'Rotten.' However, 23% of over 250 audience members gave the film a positive review with an average rating of 2.4 out of 5. Audiences polled by CinemaScore gave the film an average grade of "D-" on an A+ to F scale.

Lawrence Van Gelder of The New York Times called it "a slow-moving, thoroughly derivative movie". Writing for The Washington Post, Gary Arnold described it as "Spacehunter at an amateurish level of production".

John Nubbin reviewed Metalstorm: The Destruction of Jared-Syn for Different Worlds magazine and stated that "It is apparent that towards the end, the producers (also Band and Adler) started to run out of money. Despite the clever ways they found to stretch the dollar throughout most of the film, the budget strained their wiles towards the end of the production, and the entire project suffers vastly for it. If money had not been wasted on 3-D, the picture might have been much more enjoyable. As it is, it just misses the mark, which is a true shame."

Reviewing the film on Blu-Ray, Chris Coffel of Bloody Disgusting wrote, "It's a low budget rip off of better movies, but it's done with a lot of fun and heart." In rating it 3/5 stars, Anthony Arrigo of Dread Central recommended the Blu-Ray to fans of cheesy 1980s films, saying that although it is not a good film, it is creative and fun.

== See also ==
- List of American films of 1983
- List of 3D films
