= Under the Counter (musical) =

1945 musical

- Original language: English
- Written by: Arthur Macrae; Harold Purcell
- Music by: Manning Sherwin
- Genre: Musical

Premiere
- Date: 10 September 1945
- Place: Grand Theatre, Leeds

Under the Counter is a musical comedy composed by Manning Sherwin from a book by Arthur Macrae with lyrics by Harold Purcell. The plot is centred around shortages and black market activity during wartime rationing.

After premiering at the Grand Theatre, Leeds, before transferring for a lengthy run of 665 performances at the Phoenix Theatre in London's West End between 22 November 1945 and 5 July 1947. It starred Cicely Courtneidge, who was replaced for a month by Florence Desmond before she returned to the role. It was produced by Courtneidge's husband Jack Hulbert. The cast also included Cyril Raymond, Thorley Walters, Hartley Power, Robert Dorning, Irene Handl and Jeanne Stuart. It then toured the British provincial theatres.

In late 1947, the musical ran for 27 performances at the Shubert Theatre on Broadway, with Courtneidge and several other cast members reprising their roles alongside Ballard Berkeley and Wilfred Hyde-White. Critics praised Courtnedge but were critical of the plot and musical numbers. It was the first British musical to transfer to New York in a decade, and its failure discouraged other producers for several years. Courtneidge took the play to tour Australia for a year where it was a great success.

== Bibliography ==
- Hischak, Thomas S. The Mikado to Matilda: British Musicals on the New York Stage. Rowman & Littlefield, 2020.
- Wearing, J. P. The London Stage 1940–1949: A Calendar of Productions, Performers, and Personnel. Rowman & Littlefield, 2014.
