= Rainbow Square =

Rainbow Square is a musical with book and lyrics by Guy Bolton and Harold Purcell and music by Robert Stolz. It is set in occupied Vienna in a square bordering the American and Russian zones.

Rainbow Square played 146 performances at the Stoll Theatre in London following its 21 September 1951 premiere. Its cast included Martha King, Gloria Lane, Vera Pearce and Sonnie Hale.
