= Jenny Jones (musical) =

1944 musical

- Written by: Ronald Gow
- Music by: Harry Parr-Davies; Harold Purcell
- Original language: English
- Genre: Musical
- Setting: Rural Wales

Premiere
- Date premiered: 12 September 1944
- Place premiered: Hippodrome, Brighton

Jenny Jones is a 1944 musical composed by Harry Parr-Davies based on a book by Ronald Gow with lyrics by Harold Purcell. It is set in a Welsh village.

It premiered at the Brighton Hippodrome before transferring to begin a run of 153 performances at the London Hippodrome between 2 October 1944 and 22 January 1945. The original London cast included Carole Lynne and Jimmy James. It was produced by the impresario Edward Black.

== Bibliography ==
- Wearing, J.P. The London Stage 1940-1949: A Calendar of Productions, Performers, and Personnel. Rowman & Littlefield, 2014.
