= Patricia Burke =

English actress (1917–2003)

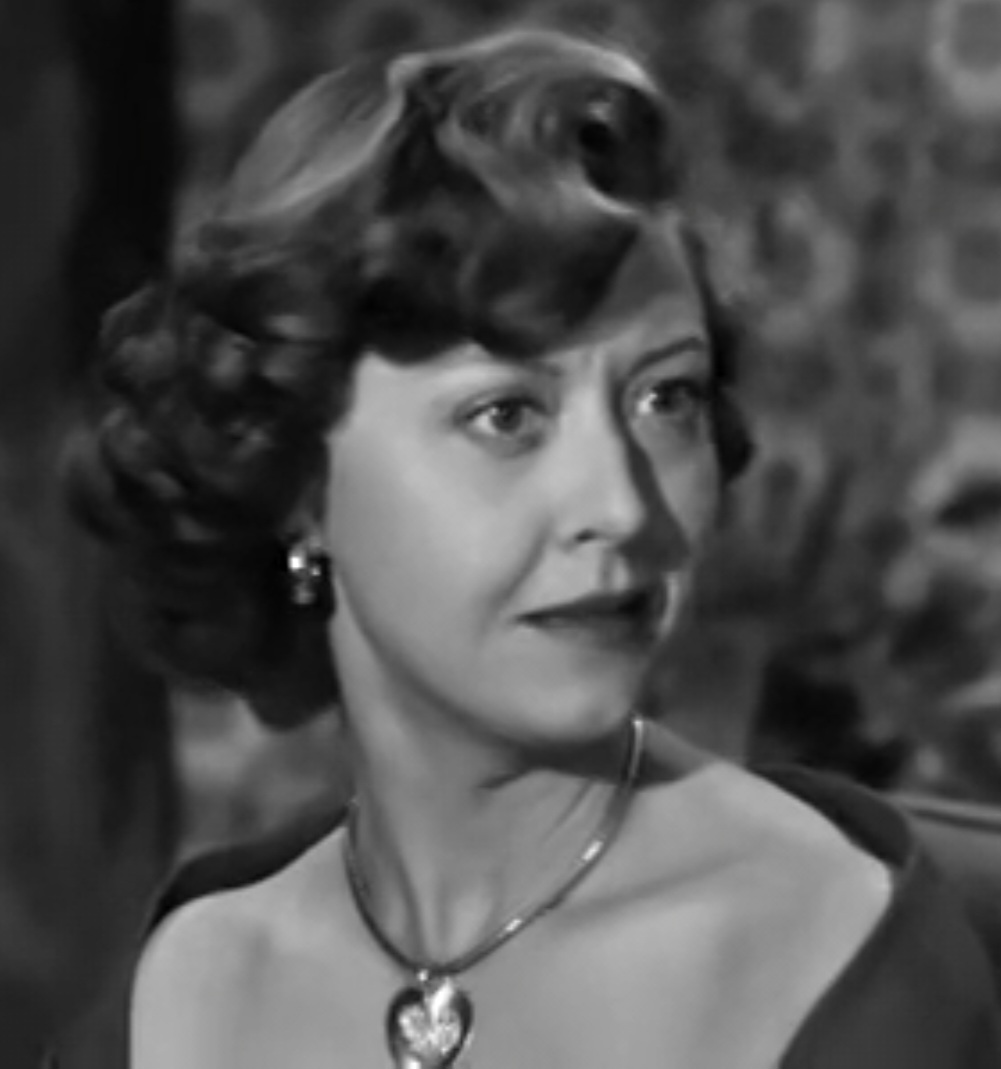
- Burke in an episode of The Public Defender (1955)
- Born: Patricia Burke; 23 March 1917; Milan, Italy
- Died: 23 November 2003 (aged 86); Draguignan, France
- Occupation: Actress
- Years active: 1937-1974
- Spouses: Michael William Kimpton; Duncan C. Macdonald; John Collingwood
- Children: 2

Patricia Burke (23 March 1917 – 23 November 2003), was an English singer and actress in cinema, stage and TV. She was the daughter of actress Marie Burke and British operatic tenor Thomas Burke.

On stage she enjoyed success in the 1943 West End musical The Lisbon Story. Patricia Burke's most well known films were Lisbon Story (1946) and The Trojan Brothers (1946), and the role of Elizabeth in the 1949 TV production of Elizabeth of Ladymead. She appeared in several episodes of the TV series The Adventures of Robin Hood between 1955 and 1958. In 1947-48 she acted in productions of Shakespeare and Shaw at the Old Vic. In 1957 she acted in a production of Aristophanes' Lysistrata at the Royal Court Theatre. Between 1958 and 1972 she played the part of Jimmy Clitheroe's mother in the BBC Radio Series The Clitheroe Kid.

== Selected filmography ==
- Jennifer Hale (1937)
- Ship's Concert (1937)
- Lisbon Story (1946)
- The Trojan Brothers (1946)
- While I Live (1947)
- Forbidden (1949)
- The Happiness of Three Women (1954)
- The Desperate Man (1959)
- Edgar Wallace Mysteries "Marriage of Convenience" (1960)
- The Impersonator (1961)
- Dilemma (1962)
- Edgar Wallace Mysteries "Strangler's Web" (1960)
- The Day the Fish Came Out (1967)
- Soft Beds, Hard Battles released in US as Undercovers Hero (1974)
