= Green Fingers (1947 film) =

1947 film

- British theatrical poster
- Directed by: John Harlow
- Screenplay by: Jack Whittingham
- Based on: novel Persistent Warrior by Edith Arundel
- Produced by: Louis H. Jackson
- Starring: Robert Beatty; Carol Raye; Nova Pilbeam
- Cinematography: Ernest Palmer
- Edited by: Joseph Sterling
- Music by: Hans May
- Production company: British National Films
- Distributed by: Anglo-American Film Corporation (UK)
- Release date: 2 June 1947 (UK)
- Running time: 83 minutes
- Country: United Kingdom
- Language: English

Green Fingers is a 1947 British drama film directed by John Harlow and starring Robert Beatty, Carol Raye and Nova Pilbeam. It was written by Jack Whittingham, based on the 1945 novel Persistent Warrior by Edith Arundel.

The film title does not use the term green fingers in its normal context, alluding to an untaught and natural skill at growing plants, but rather applies it to the world of alternative medicine and the ancient concept of individuals being natural "healers".

== Plot ==
Thomas Stone, a seaman on a fishing trawler, discovers that he has what appear to be healing powers when a crewmate is injured. He shows a natural aptitude as a healer.

He begins training formally as an osteopath, but his natural flair in combination with human sympathy causes him to treat the daughter of the family where he lodges two months before he is due to qualify. He cures her, enabling her to walk, but is thrown out of his studies as a result. He does, however, marry the girl. He also gets much press coverage for his cure – attracting many clients.

During his studies, he had waited on tables in a high-class restaurant. There he encountered Alexandra, the daughter of a doctor. Her father had failed to cure her constant headaches. She has much faith in Stone, and becomes his patron, also beginning an affair.

When he is asked to choose between his wife and Alexandra, he chooses his wife. Alexandra is furious. He refuses to believe her headache is real, and when she goes home her father is also unsympathetic. She commits suicide.

At the public inquest, he has to reveal his affair. Worse still, it is proven that his one diagnosis of a pituitary problem was wrong. If she had only been x-rayed it would have revealed an operable tumour. Stone has therefore effectively killed her. He is denounced as a quack.

His wife stands by him. Moreover, he is informed he can return to complete his studies and formally qualify, as this too would have avoided the tragedy.

On a boating trip near their home in Whitby, his wife becomes sick, and loses the power of her legs again. He wants to now wait until he is qualified or get in a professional. But she has faith in him and wants him to cure her.

The film ends with them walking hand-in-hand to Whitby Abbey with Jeannie clearly cured.

== Production ==
It was made by British National Films at Elstree Studios with some scenes shot on location in Whitby in Yorkshire. The film's sets were designed by the art director Wilfred Arnold.

== Main cast ==
- Robert Beatty as Thomas Stone
- Carol Raye as Jeannie Mansell
- Nova Pilbeam as Alexandra Baxter
- Felix Aylmer as Daniel Booth
- Moore Marriott as Pickles
- Brefni O'Rorke as Coroner
- Charles Victor as Joe Mansel
- Harry Welchman as Dr Baxter
- Edward Rigby as Albert Goodman
- Ellis Irving as Jones
- Olive Walter as Mrs Mansell
- Wally Patch as Dawson
- Daisy Burrell as Stone's receptionist

== Production ==
Filming took place over September–October 1947.

Nova Pilbeam called it a movie she "very much enjoyed doing, utterly unlike anything I had done before... I don’t think it was a particularly good film but I simply loved playing in it. I played a bitch, coming between Robert Beatty and Carol Raye, and that was fun. I suppose the film was fairly controversial in its day, being about osteopathy, which was not recognised then."

== Reception ==
Variety wrote "Unlikely to please the medical profession, this picture is the biggest boost osteopathy has yet had, although it points out the dangers of the inexperienced dabbling in the art and science... John Harlow, who achieved success with Appointment With Crime has made a fair job of a not-too-convincing story."

Kinematograph Weekly wrote "The film, popular fiction in screen form, evenly pivots on the age-old conflict between orthodox and unorthodox medical men. It is never too technical and although the hero is given the benefit of many doubts, is unlikely to lead even the most gullible patron into the consulting-rooms of ‘quacks.' The triangle, represented by Tom, Jeannie and Vicky contains most of the meat, and this is effectively parvered in picturesque Whitby and London’s West End and suburbs. The womenfolk are pretty certain to tackle its hearty and tender fare with relish. In all, a workmanlike artistic and refreshingly unpretentious piece of screen merchandise."
