= Harold Purcell =

British writer and lyricist (1907–1977)

- Born: 9 December 1907; Lewisham, London, United Kingdom
- Died: 28 May 1977 (aged 69); Worthing, Sussex, United Kingdom
- Occupations: Writer, lyricist

Harold Purcell (1907–1977) was a British writer and musical lyricist who frequently collaborated with Harry Parr-Davies. They co-wrote the book for the 1952 Anna Neagle musical The Glorious Days.

== Selected works ==
- Magyar Melody (1938)
- The Lisbon Story (1943)
- Jenny Jones (1944)
- Under the Counter (1945)
- Her Excellency (1949)
- Rainbow Square (1951)
- The Glorious Days (1952)

== Bibliography ==
- Wearing, J.P. The London Stage 1950–1959: A Calendar of Productions, Performers, and Personnel. Rowman & Littlefield, 2014.
- White, Mark. 'You Must Remember This--': Popular Songwriters 1900–1980. C. Scribner's Sons, 1985.
