= The Celebrity Game =

- Presented by: Bert Newton (1969); Mike Preston (1976–1977)
- Country of origin: Australia
- Original language: English
- No. of seasons: 2

Original release
- Network: Nine Network
- Release: 1969 – 1969
- Network: Network Ten
- Release: 1976 – 1977

The Celebrity Game is an Australian game show that aired in two different formats. The original series, based on an American game show of the same name, was hosted by Bert Newton on the Nine Network in 1969 as Australia's Celebrity Game. The later series, based on the game of charades, involving two teams of celebrities, was hosted by Mike Preston on Network Ten ran from 1976 to 1977.

== Gameplay ==
In the original 1969 version, similar to the 1964 American version, a panel of nine celebrities were asked a question on a popular topic, and three contestants were then asked to choose a celebrity and to tell how that contestant voted. After every three turns, if all three contestants correctly guessed the celebrity's answers, they each won $10; if two contestants were successful, they received $20; if one contestant was successful, that contestant received $30.

In the 1976–77 version, two teams of two celebrities and a contestant competed in the game of charades, where each player acted out words or phrases for two minutes, often by pantomiming similar-sounding words, while one player guessed the words or phrases. The celebrity regulars included Joy Chambers, Joe Martin, Johnny Pace, Harriet, Stuart Wagstaff and Barry Creyton.

== See also ==
- List of Australian game shows
- Pyramid, Australian game show
- Give Us a Clue
- People Will Talk
