= The Journalist (1979 film) =

- Film poster
- Directed by: Michael Thornhill
- Written by: Michael Thornhill; Edna Wilson
- Produced by: Pom Oliver
- Starring: Jack Thompson; Elizabeth Alexander; Sam Neill; Carol Raye; Charles (Bud) Tingwell; Stuart Wagstaff; Penne Hackforth-Jones
- Cinematography: Donald McAlpine
- Edited by: Tim Welburn; Ron Williams
- Production companies: FJ Promoters; Edgcliff; NSW Film Corporation
- Distributed by: Roadshow
- Release date: 22 November 1979
- Running time: 83 minutes
- Country: Australia
- Language: English
- Budget: AU$400,000
- Box office: AU $52,000 (Australia)

The Journalist is a 1979 Australian sex comedy about the romantic adventures of a journalist (Jack Thompson). It has the reputation as one of the worst Australian films of all time.

== Plot ==
Journalist Simon Morris has trouble with his love life. He is separated from his wife Wendy and daughter Suzie and lives with his girlfriend Liz. He is assigned to cover a conference in Hong Kong and sleeps with a woman there. Back in Australia he sleeps with another woman.

== Cast ==
- Jack Thompson as Simon Morris
- Sam Neill as Rex
- Elizabeth Alexander as Liz Corbett
- Carol Raye as Maggie
- Bud Tingwell as Sid Mitchell
- Penne Hackforth-Jones as Gillie Griffiths
- Frank Wilson as Vic Parson
- Dennis Miller as Junior Interviewer
- Chard Hayward as Barry
- Martyn Sanderson as Bert
- Jane Harders as Wendy Morris
- Michelle Jarman

== Production ==
Michael Thornhill wrote the outline for the film with Edna Wilson, a journalist, in August 1978. Roadshow agreed to distribute and agreed to invest money in the film. In October the New South Wales Film Corporation agreed to invest on the basis of a second draft script. Thornhill had been on the board of the corporation so this was controversial at the time due to a perceived conflict of interest.

By December, the movie was cast. Thornhill later reflected the film "wasn’t supposed to be realistic, and it bears no resemblance to Australian journalism whatsoever. In the film we have newspapers and television stations unconnected, which is the norm overseas but, as you know, is not the case here.” He saw The Journalist as "a modest little thing I thought I could get going fast”.

Roadshow wanted Jack Thompson to play the lead and a second draft was written with him in mind. The shoot started in Sydney on 22 January 1979 and went for five weeks with several days of filming in Hong Kong. The budget was estimated as being between $380,000 and $500,000.

Thompson said prior to filming "We hope this film will be a lightweight domestic comedy - something like an Australian answer to the American film Fun with Dick and Jane. This is a genre which has not been undertaken in Australia before." Thornhill said the film was as representative of journalism as The Goodbye Girl had been of amateur theatre in New York.

It was Thompson's return to leading roles after having played support characters for a number of years. "Two years ago eight out of the ten films presented to the film corporations seem to have been written for me in the lead role," he said. "And those films were all the same - there was an obligatory fight and the lead character was tough. I have made a deliberate decision that I can come back to the centre screen, now that I am offered a variety of roles."

Thompson was seeking finance for a passion project around this time Wandering Stranger but was unable to secure it. According to Filmink, "yet somehow, producers found the money for The Journalist (1979). Life is strange."

Two editors were used on the film to help it be ready in time for the Cannes Film Festival.

== Reception ==
The movie was part of a slate of sixteen Australian films that screened at the Cannes Film Festival in April 1979.

David Stratton later wrote in The Last New Wave that the film was:

Feeble beyond belief... Establishing scenes are sketchy and stiff, the trip to Hong Kong seems utterly extraneous, the theme of the habitual womaniser has been handled infinitely better before by Tim Burstall. The film is uncertain of its tone, and veers wildly between unfunny silent screen style slapstick... to sententious comment on the way its male chauvinist protagonist carries on... What jokes there are seem mostly to be in-jokes inaccessible to a general audience... The actors seem acutely embarrassed, especially Jack Thompson who has never given a stiffer or more awkward performance; only Sam Neill emerges with some credit.

The film was very poorly received critically and commercially. Thornhill:

The Journalist was a misfire completely and I think it was my fault entirely. We should never have had Jack Thompson. He was just miscast. He's not a comedian. He's a serious, solid actor. We should have had Sam Neill in the lead role and you would have had a debonair roue - it was meant to be a debonair roue. It was meant to be a piece of fluff, a piece of effervescent fluff that came out feeling like lard.

The Sun Herald called it "a mediocre story that is sometimes slapdash in its execution... an unambitious failure."

Robert Macklin wrote a novelisation of the script for $5,000.

Thornhill later claimed:

It’s another example of a film that Australian writers will call a male chauvinist sexist masturbatory fantasy and overseas it will be seen as a feminist picture attacking the Australian male. But I don’t really care what people here think. People here follow the overseas trends and think they’re being revolutionary.
