= Carol Raye =

Australian actress and comedian (1923–2022)

Carol Raye AM
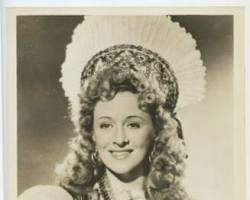
- Carol Raye as Empress Maria in Waltz Time
- Born: Kathleen Mary Corkrey; 17 January 1923; Rotherhithe, London, Middlesex, England
- Died: 18 June 2022 (aged 99); Macleay Valley, New South Wales, Australia
- Other name: Carole Raye
- Occupations: Actress; comedienne; singer; dancer; radio and television producer; radio and television director; series creator; television executive; media personality
- Years active: 1938–2000
- Known for: Films –: Strawberry Roan; Waltz Time; Green Fingers; While I Live; Television – The Mavis Bramston Show as actress and producer Number 96 As Baroness Amanda Von Pappenburg
- Spouse(s): 1-Clark Spencer married 1945-? 2-Robert Ayre Smith married 1951-2006
- Children: 3

Carol Raye AM (17 January 1923 – 18 June 2022 as Kathleen Mary Corkrey and also billed as Carole Raye) was a British-born Australian actress and comedian of film, television, radio, theatre and revue. She was also a singer, dancer, producer, director and media personality.

Her career spanned some seven decades, firstly as a film star and stage performer in the United Kingdom, in such movies as Song of Romance, Strawberry Roan and Waltz Time, after which she briefly worked in Kenya. She then immigrated to Australia, where she became notable for her small-screen roles, and as the first female television executive at a time when the industry was dominated by men.

Raye was best known as the creator, producer and original star of the iconic TV satire The Mavis Bramston Show, alongside Gordon Chater and Barry Creyton, as well as a semi-regular star of soap opera Number 96, as Baroness Amanda von Pappenburg.

== Early life ==
Raye was born in Rotherhithe, south east, London Docklands, Middlesex England, the daughter of Royal Navy commander Reuben B. Corkrey and Ethel McGlashan, an accomplished pianist. The family travelled extensively, including stays in Bermuda and Malta, until her father was stationed at the Portsmouth Navy Base.

Raye's early ambition was to become a dance teacher, and she trained in ballet and ballroom at the Southsea School of Dance.

== Career ==
=== Britain ===
Raye won her first stage role in No, No, Nanette in 1938, and was discovered the following year by Australian-born choreographer and producer Freddie Carpenter, then operating a dance academy in Soho, who further trained her in dance. Carpenter suggested her for a tour of the musical comedy Bobby Get Your Gun and was also instrumental in creating her stage name.She made her professional debut opposite Bobby Howes and Bertha Bellmore at the Manchester Opera House in 1939. Her breakthrough stage role came only months later, in Funny Side Up at His Majesty's Theatre, which marked her London debut.

Raye began her screen career with starring roles in films including Song of Romance, which was the first British musical film shot in technicolor, and Strawberry Roan (1945) by Maurice Elvey. However it was 1945 musical romance Waltz Time by Paul Stein, as Empress Maria that launched her international screen career. That year in April, she toured the United States with the lead role in a stage production of Bonanza Bound!. She turned down a multi-year Hollywood contract, deciding return to London, where she subsequently appeared in features including Spring Song (1946) directed by Montgomery Tully and two films directed by John Harlow, Green Fingers (1947) and While I Live (1947) as well as several telemovies for the BBC.

Raye also played lead roles in many musicals and television productions in her native Britain. Her theatre roles included Tough at the Top, Fun and Games and The Merry Widow, Dear Miss Phoebe and The Ticket-of-Leave Man.

=== Kenya ===
Raye having remarried in 1951, and with her husband being offered by the British Government, the opportunity to run a 1000-acre farm in the overseas Kenya Colony, the family settled in Navaisha Town, in the West of Mombasa. Whilst in Kenya, two filmmakers offered Raye the lead role in their film No Rain in Timbura, which would be the first feature produced in that country. She worked briefly as a producer/director and on-screen talent for the Kenya Broadcasting Corporation from 1961 to 1964, making her one of the first faces on British East African television.

=== Australia ===
After the family emigrated to Australia in 1964, Raye was introduced to the ABC's Charles Moses, who in turn recommended her to Seven Network CEO James Oswin at Sydney station ATN-7, where she took a job as network assistant to the General Manager. She devised the concept of a satirical television series, based on Phillip Street Theatre revues and British TV series The Week That Was. In November 1964, the network gave the green light for The Mavis Bramston Show, in which Raye starred as one of three originals, along with Gordon Chater and Barry Creyton. She also produced the pilot episode and co-produced the series (with Michael Plant), until her departure from the show in late 1965. She resumed work on the series for the 1967 and 1968 final seasons.

In the 1970s, Raye played the ongoing comedy role of much-married British socialite and baroness Amanda von Pappenburg, aunt of Don Finlayson (played by Joe Hasham) whom she visits from Heidelberg, Germany, in the top-rated soap opera Number 96. She also portrayed Amanda's lookalike, Claudine. The Duke of Bedford and his wife appeared as guests on the show. After two substantial stints with the series between 1973 and 1974, Amanda was permanently written out of the serial, but Raye remained on as creative director, casting regular characters, and reviewing scripts and storylines.

From 1976 to 1977, Raye appeared in the medical soap opera The Young Doctors, playing the guest role of Rosalie Parker. She also appeared in comedy series Up The Convicts with Frankie Howard and alongside Jack Thompson and Sam Neill in the 1979 film The Journalist.

As a notable media personality, she often appeared on The Mike Walsh Show, was a regular panellist on game show Blankety Blanks and was also the subject of an episode of This Is Your Life.

In the early 1980s, Raye had a four-year appointment with the Theatre Board of the Australia Council. She appeared in many Australian theatre productions, including California Suite, The Pleasure of His Company, Travelling North, The Merry Wives of Windsor, You Can't Take It With You, Noises Off, and Hay Fever.

Raye retired in 2000, following a guest appearance in SeaChange as the mother of Sigrid Thornton’s character. Subsequently she campaigned Seven Network boss Kerry Stokes to release a DVD of The Mavis Bramston Show, although in a DVD release of 32 episodes of Number 96, she provided an audio commentary alongside co-star Elisabeth Kirkby, film and TV critic Andrew Mercado and The Honourable Michael Kirby.

== Personal life and death ==
On 3 November 1945, Raye married U.S. Army Engineer Captain Clark Spencer, a "prominent Winchester and Marblehead sportsman" (Massachusetts, USA).

In 1951, she married prominent veterinarian Robert Ayre Smith (1926–2006). They had three children, two of whom followed their mother into theatrical roles. Her eldest child, Sally Ayre Smith, is a former television producer, best known for the ABC series SeaChange, but is now a director of an organic farm produce marketing business. Her youngest daughter, Harriet, born in 1961 started her career in the Sydney Theatre Company office and is also an occasional actress.

Raye died peacefully at her home in Macleay Valley on the mid-north coast of New South Wales on 19 June 2022, at the age of 99, after a short illness. Her daughters were by her side. She was survived by her three children and three grandchildren.

== Honours ==
Raye was honoured in the 2022 Commonwealth of Australian Queens Birthday Honours List, with an appointment to the Member of the Order of Australia (AM), with the citation For services to the arts as an actress and producer.

== Filmography ==
=== Film ===
Year	Title	Role	Type
1945	Strawberry Roan	Molly Lowe	Feature film
1945	Waltz Time	Empress Maria	Feature film
1945	Dressing Up		TV film
1946	Spring Song	Janet Hill / Janet Ware	Feature film
1947	Green Fingers	Jeannie Mansell	Feature film
1947	While I Live (aka Dream of Olwen)	Sally Grant	Feature film
1949	The Good Companions	Susie Dean	TV film
1949	Happy Week-End	Polly	TV film
1950	Triple Bill		TV film
1954	No Rain at Timbura	Mrs Carol Massey	
1956	Ivor Novello		TV film
1979	The Journalist	Maggie	Feature film
1984	Man of Letters	Ursula Panhindle	TV film
1985	Remember Me	Jenny's mother	TV film
1985	Relatives	Aunty Joan	Feature film

=== Television ===
Year	Title	Role	Type
1964–1968	The Mavis Bramston Show	Various roles	
1965	Today with Carol Raye	Host	
1965	The Peek Snatchers	Self	
1966	66 And All That	Host	
1966	Australian Playhouse	The Woman	Teleplay: "Across the Bridge"
1967	The Delightfully Desperate, Daring and Different Doings of Daphne Davenport	Daphne Davenport	Teleplay
1969	The Pennyweathers		TV pilot
1969	Riptide	Lauriana French	1 episode
1970	Tarbuck's Luck	Self	1 episode
1973–1975	Number 96	Baroness Amanda Von Papenburg / Claudine	35 episodes
1976	Up The Convicts	Lady Fitzgibbon	
1976	This Is Your Life: Gordon Chater	Guest	1 episode
1976–1977	The Young Doctors	Rosalie Parker	15 episodes
1977–1978	Graham Kennedy's Blankety Blanks	Regular panellist	16 episodes
1977	This Is Your Life: Carol Raye	Guest	1 episode
1978	Cappriccio!	Host	
1978	Loss of Innocence	Julie	Miniseries, 1 episode
1978	Chopper Squad	Eileen Traill	1 episode
1978	Micro Macro	Team Leader	
1978	Exploring the Psychic Mind	Host	
1987	Rafferty's Rules		
1994	Mission Top Secret	Mrs. Jessie Burdock (uncredited)	1 episode
1994	The Mavis Bramston 30th Anniversary Special	Herself	TV special
2000	SeaChange	June Dawson	1 episode
2022	Pushing the Boundaries: The Mavis Bramston Show		TV documentary

== Theatre ==
Year	Title	Role	Type	Ref.
1938	No, No, Nanette	Nanette	Southsea Theatre	
1939	Bobby Get Your Gun		Manchester Opera House	
1940	Funny Side Up (aka Laugh Clown Laugh)	Ensemble	His Majesty's Theatre, London, Opera House Theatre, Blackpool	
1941	Fun and Games	The Dancer	Princes Theatre, West End	
1943–1944	The Merry Widow	Frou-Frou	His Majesty's Theatre, London	
	The Love Racket			
1947–1948	Bonanza Bound	Belinda Da Vinci	US tour	
1949	Tough at the Top	Ruritanian Princess	Adelphi Theatre, London	
1950–1951	Dear Miss Phoebe	Miss Phoebe Throssel	UK tour	
1956	Harmony Close	Jill Grant	Theatre Royal, Birmingham	
1957	The Ticket-of-Leave Man	May Edwards	Arts Theatre, London	
1969	Lie Back and Enjoy It		Phillip St Theatre, Sydney	
1970	This, That and the Other		Palace Theatre, Southend-on-Sea	
1976	California Suite	Hannah Warren / Diana Nichols / Gert Franklyn	Ensemble Theatre, Sydney	
1977	The Pleasure of His Company	Katharine Dougherty	Theatre Royal Sydney, Comedy Theatre, Melbourne with AETT	
1978	The Mighty 1978 RSL Talent Quest	Performer / Guest Judge	Whitehorse Pub Theatre, Sydney	
1979	Travelling North	Frances	Nimrod, Sydney, Melbourne Athenaeum, Civic Playhouse, Newcastle with Hunter Valley Theatre Company	
1980	The Merry Wives of Windsor	Mistress Alice Ford	Sydney Opera House with STC	
1981	Hay Fever	Judith Bliss	Playhouse, Newcastle with Hunter Valley Theatre Company	
1982	You Can't Take It With You		Sydney Opera House with STC	
1982	Night and Day	Ruth Carson	Marian St Theatre, Sydney, Canberra Theatre Centre	
1982–1983	Noises Off	Dotty Otley	Australian tour	
1984	Agnes of God	Mother Miriam	Melbourne Athenaeum, University of Sydney with AETT	
1985	Stepping Out	Vera	Australian tour	
1989–1990	Hay Fever		Australian tour with Peter & Ellen Williams	
