= Dear Miss Phoebe =

1950 musical

- Written by: Christopher Hassall
- Music by: Harry Parr-Davies
- Original language: English
- Genre: Musical
- Setting: England, 1810s

Premiere
- Date premiered: 31 July 1950
- Place premiered: Theatre Royal, Birmingham

Dear Miss Phoebe is a musical with a book by Christopher Hassall and music by Harry Parr-Davies. It is based on the play Quality Street by J.M. Barrie.

It premiered at the Theatre Royal, Birmingham before transferring to the Phoenix Theatre in London's West End, where it ran for 283 performances between 13 October 1950 and 16 June 1951. The original London cast included Carol Raye, Peter Graves, Olga Lindo, Moya Nugent, Gretchen Franklin and Noel Dyson. The song "I Leave My Heart in an English Garden" from it is particularly well-known.

== Bibliography ==
- Wearing, J. P. The London Stage 1950-1959: A Calendar of Productions, Performers, and Personnel. Rowman & Littlefield, 2014.
