= While I Live =

- Opening titles
- Directed by: John Harlow
- Written by: John Harlow, Doreen Montgomery
- Based on: play Olwen by Robert Bell
- Produced by: Edward Dryhurst
- Starring: Sonia Dresdel; Tom Walls; Carol Raye
- Cinematography: Freddie Young
- Edited by: Doug Robertson
- Music by: Charles Williams
- Distributed by: 20th Century Fox (UK)
- Release date: 7 October 1947
- Running time: 85 min
- Country: United Kingdom
- Language: English
- Budget: £200,000

While I Live (also known as The Dream of Olwen) is a 1947 British drama film directed by John Harlow and starring Sonia Dresdel, Tom Walls and Carol Raye. It was written by Harlow and Doreen Montgomery based on a play by Robert Bell, referred to in the opening credits as This Same Garden, and first produced as Olwen in March 1947, with Hilda Bayley as Julia.

While I Live is best remembered for its musical theme "The Dream of Olwen" composed by Charles Williams, reprised at intervals throughout the film, which became hugely popular in its time and is still regularly performed.

== Plot ==
In Cornwall in 1922, young pianist and composer Olwen Trevelyan is struggling with the ending of a piano tone poem she is composing. Driven to complete the piece by her domineering elder sister Julia, Olwen becomes agitated and despondent, and one night sleepwalks to the edge of a cliff near their home. Julia follows her and shouts her name but Olwen, abruptly awakened, loses her balance and falls to her death on the rocks below. Julia is unable to come to terms with Olwen's death and the guilt of her own role in it, over the years becoming a reclusive, obsessive figure whose main raison d'être is to keep Olwen's memory alive. Olwen's final composition gains her posthumous recognition, and each year on the anniversary of her death it is broadcast on the radio.

On the 25th anniversary of Olwen's death, Julia is listening to the broadcast when she hears a frantic knocking at the door and opens it to admit an unknown young woman, who immediately walks up to the piano and begins expertly playing along with the piece on the radio. The young woman claims to have lost her memory and to have no idea of who she is or how she came to chance upon the isolated house, yet she seems to have a familiarity with the surroundings and the history of the Trevelyan family. Struck by her physical resemblance to Olwen, Julia offers her refuge and, also seeing behavioural traits reminiscent of Olwen, becomes convinced that the woman is the reincarnation of her dead sister. A local faith healer, Nehemiah, who also claims second sight, becomes involved and it seems increasingly as though history is repeating itself, culminating when the young woman too is found standing precariously on the edge of the cliff from which Olwen fell.

== Cast ==
- Sonia Dresdel as Julia Trevelyan
- Tom Walls as Nehemiah
- Carol Raye as Sally Grant
- Patricia Burke as Christine Sloan
- Clifford Evans as Peter Sloan
- John Warwick as George Grant
- Audrey Fildes as Olwen Trevelyan
- Charles Victor as Sgt. Pearne
- Edward Lexy as Selby
- Ernest Butcher as Ambrose
- Enid Hewitt as Ruth
- Sally Rogers as Hannah

== Reception ==
The Monthly Film Bulletin wrote: "This totally unreal production has nothing to commend it. The tone poem, which is the cause of all the bother, is not worth finishing anyway; and a Cornish atmosphere is hardly achieved by means of a few seascapes, Tom Walls as Nehemiah saying 'My dear Soul,' at intervals, and Clifford Evans, who is supposed to have been brought up in Cornwall by Julia, retaining his Welsh accent. Sonia Dresdel does not induce belief in the unbalanced Julia; and the whole thing, with the exception of Patricia Burke's performance as a refreshingly normal young woman, is as unreal as a backcloth."

Kine Weekly wrote: "Artistically mounted screen novelette, confidently addressed to the distaff side of the popular box-office. ... Sonia Dresdel makes comparatively easy work of the ticklish leading role and both the supporting cast and the staging are above average. Sincere and showmanlike treatment successfully removes the odour of mothballs from its time-honoured 'pages.' Very good programmer, and British at that!"
