= Jack Grimsley =

- Born: 18 October 1925; Melbourne, Australia
- Died: 8 June 2015 (aged 89); Australia
- Occupations: Musical director and composer

John Franklin Grimsley (18 October 1925 – 8 June 2015) known as Jack Grimsley was an Australian musical director and composer who worked as the musical director at Network Ten between 1966 and 1988. He also worked on many compilation albums involving various styles of music, including jazz and swing music.

Grimsley responsible for the creating the theme music of Wheel of Fortune and Sale of the Century in Australia. The 2005 revival of Sale of the Century, known as Temptation did not use Grimsley's theme, although Wheel of Fortune kept the original score with an updated rendition of his theme in 1995. Grimsley also worked on shows such as Blankety Blanks, Benny Hill Down Under, and the Ian Turpie era of The Price is Right. His orchestra provided the score for the musical Say It With Music.

Grimsley worked with many famous Australian musicians such as John Williamson and even played instruments on their albums such as the piano on Road Thru The Heart and Boomerang Café. He died on 8 June 2015, aged 89.
