= The Glorious Days =

1952 musical

- Original language: English
- Written by: Robert Nesbitt; Miles Malleson
- Music by: Harry Parr Davis; Harold Purcell
- Genre: Musical

Premiere
- Date: 30 July 1952
- Place: Palace Theatre, Manchester

The Glorious Days is a 1952 British musical composed by Harry Parr Davis and Harold Purcell from a book by Robert Nesbitt and Miles Malleson. It was designed as a vehicle for Anna Neagle, showcasing her in several roles throughout history including two Nell Gwynn and Queen Victoria which she had played in films.

After premiering at the Palace Theatre in Manchester it transferred to London's West End where it ran for 256 performances at the Palace Theatre on Charing Cross Road between 28 February and 7 November 1953. As well as Neagle the cast included Patrick Holt, Peter Graves and Lesley Osmond.

== Synopsis ==
In Second World War London an actress is knocked unconscious following an explosion during an air raid. In her dreams she is transported to historical settings, encountering Charles II and Prince Albert.

== Adaptation ==
In 1954 it was adapted into a film Lilacs in the Spring directed by Herbert Wilcox and starring Neagle, Errol Flynn and David Farrar. In contrast to the stage musical it was not a great commercial or critical success.

== Bibliography ==
- Wearing, J.P. The London Stage 1950-1959: A Calendar of Productions, Performers, and Personnel. Rowman & Littlefield, 2014.
