= Meet Sexton Blake! =

- Opening title card
- Directed by: John Harlow
- Screenplay by: John Harlow
- Based on: The Mystery of the Free Frenchmen by Anthony Parsons
- Produced by: Louis H. Jackson
- Starring: David Farrar; Manning Whiley; Dennis Arundell; John Varley
- Cinematography: Geoffrey Faithfull
- Edited by: Vi Burdon
- Music by: Percival Mackey
- Production companies: Strand Film Company (for); British National Films
- Distributed by: Anglo-American Film Corporation (UK)
- Release date: 5 February 1945 (UK)
- Running time: 80 minutes
- Country: United Kingdom
- Language: English

Meet Sexton Blake! is a 1945 British second feature ('B') drama film directed by John Harlow and starring David Farrar, Manning Whiley, Dennis Arundell, and John Varley. It was written by Harlow based on the 1940 novel The Mystery of the Free Frenchmen by Anthony Parsons. It was one of two films directed by Harlow in which Farrar played Sexton Blake, the other being The Echo Murders (1945).

== Plot ==
Important documents are stolen from a dead man during an air raid, and the War Office call in Sexton Blake to investigate.

== Cast ==
- David Farrar as Sexton Blake
- Manning Whiley as Raoul Sudd
- Dennis Arundell as Johann Sudd
- John Varley as Tinker
- Betty Huntley-Wright as Nobby
- Gordon McLeod as Inspector Venner
- Kathleen Harrison as Mrs Bardell
- Cyril Smith as Belford
- Magda Kun as Yvonne
- Ferdy Mayne as Slant-Eyes
- Charles Farrell as Skipper
- Roddy Hughes as Ferraby
- Philip Godfrey as James Baird
- Tony Arpino as Torch
- Charles Rolfe as Mario Carloni
- Elsie Wagstaff as Mrs Baird
- David Keir as Charlie Kunn

== Critical reception ==
The Monthly Film Bulletin wrote: "This is a long-drawn-out murder story unfolded in confusing manner and with the actual murder sequences photographed in crude detail. The cast, headed by David Farrar as Sexton Blake and John Varley as Tinker, is an efficient one, but they are hampered by dialogue which tends to make their performances seem amateurish."

Kine Weekly wrote: "This British offering attempts a little too much to achieve coherence, let alone convincing entertainment. The story, exploring the crime calendar from opium dens to grisly murder, is never held in clear perspective and only a master mind will follow it with any accuracy. Competently acted and staged, it nevertheless has undeniable box-office claims in its title and, on this score alone, should make a reliable programmer for industrial halls and the masses as a whole."

Picturegoer wrote: "If it's blood and thunder – and unitentional laughter – you are after, this is your meat."

TV Guide called the film "entertaining in an unintended way", rating it two out of five stars.
