= The Echo Murders =

- Directed by: John Harlow
- Screenplay by: John Harlow
- Based on: The Terror of Tregarwith by Hector Hawton (as John Sylvester)
- Produced by: Louis H. Jackson
- Starring: David Farrar; Dennis Price
- Cinematography: James Wilson
- Edited by: Lito Carruthers
- Music by: Percival Mackey
- Production companies: British National Films; Strand Film Company Ltd.
- Distributed by: Anglo-American Film Corporation (UK)
- Release date: 17 December 1945 (UK)
- Running time: 75 minutes
- Country: United Kingdom
- Language: English

The Echo Murders is a 1945 British thriller film directed by John Harlow and starring David Farrar and Dennis Price. It was written by Harlow based on the story "The Terror of Tregarwith" by Hector Hawton (as John Sylvester).

It was one of two films directed by Harlow in which Farrar played Sexton Blake, the other being Meet Sexton Blake (1945).

== Plot ==
A man's life is threatened and he seeks the assistance of Sexton Blake.

== Cast ==
- David Farrar as Sexton Blake
- Dennis Price as Dick Warren
- Pamela Stirling as Stella Duncan
- Julien Mitchell as James Duncan
- Cyril Smith as Police Constable Smith
- Dennis Arundell as Rainsford
- Ferdy Mayne as Dacier
- Johnnie Schofield as Purvis
- Paul Croft as Marat
- Kynaston Reeves as Beales
- Desmond Roberts as Cotter
- Danny Green as Carl
- Patric Curwen as Dr. Grey
- Tony Arpino as Fox
- Vincent Holman as Col. Wills
- Gerald Pring as Sir Horace Cranston

== Reception ==
The Monthly Film Bulletin wrote: "The plot has elements of probability, but is too heavily overlaid with absurdities and situations which it is difficult to accept seriously. Shots of the Cornish coast are pleasing and the members of the cast are adequate in the roles assigned to them, David Farrar, in particular, being suitably 'tough' as the necessarily tough detective."

Kine Weekly wrote: "Serial-like blood and thunder, latest of the robust Sexton Blake series ... There are so many strings and characters to the plot that it is impossible to keep track of them all, but the hearty, though hardly plausible, surface action should keep the industrial ninepennies on their toes."

Picturegoer wrote: "Another of the Sexton Blake series, with David Farrar as the famous sleuth ... It's all very juvenile in the best 'blood and thunder' tradition. Kynaston Reeves is good as the villain, but the supporting cast is not all that could be desired."
