= Appointment with Crime =

1946 British film by John Harlow

- Directed by: John Harlow
- Written by: John Harlow
- Produced by: Louis H. Jackson
- Starring: William Hartnell; Raymond Lovell; Robert Beatty; Joyce Howard
- Cinematography: Gerald Moss; James Wilson
- Edited by: Monica Kimick
- Music by: George Melachrino
- Production company: British National Films Ltd
- Distributed by: Anglo-American Film Corporation
- Release date: 4 November 1946 (UK)
- Running time: 92 minutes
- Country: United Kingdom
- Language: English

Appointment with Crime is a 1946 British crime film directed and written by John Harlow and starring William Hartnell, Raymond Lovell, Joyce Howard and Robert Beatty.

== Plot ==
Leo Martin works for a criminal gang run by Gus Loman that primarily uses a smash and grab tactic. During one particular risky robbery heist, Leo breaks the window at a jewellery store only to have his wrists broken by a security shutter falling on them. He is soon caught and brought to prison to serve his term. Throughout his stay, Leo does not reveal who he is working for to the authorities but instead serves his time, angered by Gus for running out on him during the robbery.

When Leo is released, he returns to Gus to obtain a job. Gus harshly rebuffs him and points out how Leo's injured wrists would prevent him from working as a thief. This leads Leo to seek complete vengeance against Gus. He decides to frame Gus for murder by stealing his gun and murdering the getaway driver (now working as a cab driver) who had also abandoned him during the abortive raid. He manages to provide himself with an alibi to avoid any prosecution. During this scheme he meets Carol Dane, who is unaware of his true nature, and the two begin a romance. Later he confronts Gus with the understanding that if he does not give him money he'll hand over the gun to the police.

After Gus hands over the money, he contacts Gregory Lang, whom he is actually working under. Gregory is an antiques dealer who hired Gus to steal jewellery and art pieces for him. Meanwhile, Leo learns that Detective Inspector Rogers is investigating the murder case. He attempts to assure Rogers that he is attempting to live a life away from crime, but Rogers continues to question Leo's character and whereabouts during the night of the murder.

Things begin to go downhill when Leo and Gregory learn that it was actually Gregory's gun that was used rather than Gus's. Gregory becomes upset and has his companion plot to murder Gus while forcefully threatening Leo. Leo's wrists are crushed again, but he and Gus reach a deal for Leo to bring back the gun and steal a jewel. All the while, Rogers uncovers more and more clues.

When Leo steals the jewel and brings back the gun to Gregory, a gunfight ensues, leaving Gregory dead. As Leo jumps on the train to run away with Carol, she confronts him about his lies. Soon after, Rogers arrives after finally learning that Leo murdered the cab driver. He prepares to apprehend Leo, but Leo tries to jump out of the train window only to have the window slam shut on his wrists.

== Cast ==
- William Hartnell as Leo Martin
- Raymond Lovell as Gus Loman
- Joyce Howard as Carol Dane
- Robert Beatty as Detective Inspector Rogers
- Herbert Lom as Gregory Lang
- Alan Wheatley as Noel Penn
- Cyril Smith as Detective Sergeant Charlie Weeks
- Elsie Wagstaff as Mrs. Wilkins
- Ian Fleming as prison governor
- Wally Patch as Joe Fisher (garage manager)
- Ian McLean as Detective Mason
- Wilfrid Hyde-White as cleaner
- Ivor Barnard as Jonah Crackle

== Reception ==
=== Box office ===
Appointment with Crime was the 12th most popular film at the British box office in 1946 after The Wicked Lady, The Bells of St. Mary's, Piccadilly Incident, The Captive Heart, Road to Utopia, Caravan, Anchors Away, The Corn is Green, Gilda, The House on 92nd Street and The Overlanders.

=== Critical reception ===
The Monthly Film Bulletin wrote: "This is one of a few modest but unusual crime films turned out by British studios. Free from the usual night-club and carchase clichés of the American second-feature thriller, it contains a credible story and more sensitive psychological perception than many more ambitious productions. In an extremely strong cast, William Hartnell stands out with a particularly good performance as the mean, plausible rat, turning easily to brutal crimes to compensate for his wounded vanity. Excellent acting on the part of both stars and minor characters, combined with sensitive and imaginative direction, make this an outstanding film of its class."

The Radio Times called it "solid noir," rating it 3/5 stars.
