= Dennis Arundell =

English actor (1898–1988)

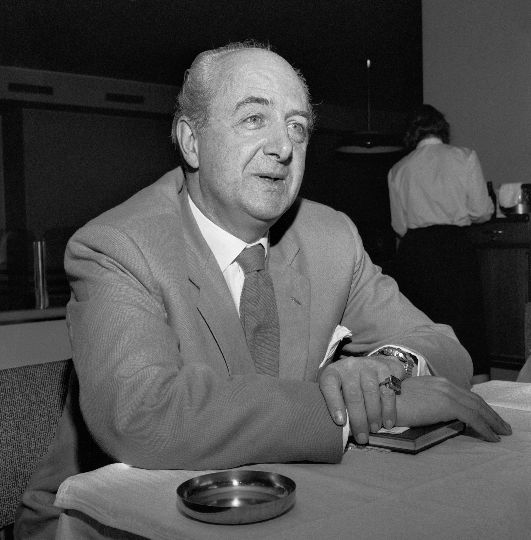
Dennis Arundell, 1957

Dennis Drew Arundell OBE (22 July 1898 – 10 December 1988) was a British actor, librettist, opera scholar, translator, producer, director, conductor and composer of incidental music who was born in Finchley and died in Camden.

== Life and career ==
Arundell's studies at St John's College, Cambridge, reading Classics and Music, were interrupted by the First World War, where in 1918 he was gassed and invalided out. As a Fellow of the College from 1923 to 1929 he mounted the first staging of Handel's Semele in 1926, and an early British performance of Stravinsky's L'Histoire du soldat. He took the title role in the first British performance of Pirandello's Enrico IV, with designs by Cecil Beaton. He also developed a lifelong love of the music of Purcell; publishing a book and conducting and producing The Fairy-Queen in Hyde Park in 1927, and editing King Arthur the following year. His professional acting debut took place at the Lyric Hammersmith in 1926 in the revue Riverside Nights and he created the role of Viscount Harkaway in Tantivy Towers. In 1933 he joined the Old Vic company in 1933, appearing as Lucio in Measure for Measure, Scandal in Love for Love, and Antonio in The Tempest, also composing the incidental music. He was the first to play Lord Peter Wimsey on stage (Busman's Honeymoon), and created the role of the obsessed husband in Gas Light.

After the Second World War Arundell concentrated on opera – as producer, translator, teacher, and historian. Among translations from this period were Le Roi David (which he had staged in 1929 in its first British performance), Háry János, Schwanda the Bagpiper, Jeanne d'Arc au bûcher, From the House of the Dead, Il matrimonio segreto, and, for the film by Powell and Pressburger, The Tales of Hoffmann. He also produced operas such as I quatro rusteghi (1946), Faust (1947), Katya Kabanova (1951 UK premiere), Tosca, and The Flying Dutchman, for Sadler's Wells Opera. His production technique was described as having "dramatic vigour and stage mastery", while displaying his "breadth of historical inquiry".

He directed a revival of The Bohemian Girl at Covent Garden in 1951 with Beecham conducting, following this with the same conductor the first production of Irmelin at the New Theatre in Oxford in 1953.

He also worked as a producer for Australian Opera and the Finnish National Theatre and Opera, and was head of opera at the Royal College of Music from 1959 to 1973.

Arundell's publications include an edition of Congreve's text for Semele (1925), Dryden and Howard (1929), The Critic at the Opera (1957), and The Story of Sadler's Wells (1965, 2nd edition 1978). He gave lectures at the Society of Theatre Research, broadcast regularly, was a member of the Purcell Society, and wrote for Opera magazine.

== Selected filmography ==
- The Show Goes On (1937)
- Glamour Girl (1938)
- "Pimpernel" Smith (1941)
- Penn of Pennsylvania (1941)
- The Life and Death of Colonel Blimp (1943)
- The Saint Meets the Tiger (1943)
- The Echo Murders (1945)
- The Man from Morocco (1945)
- Meet Sexton Blake! (1945)
- The End of the River (1947)
