= Ugly Dave Gray =

Australian comedian

- Born: Graham David Taylor; 26 December 1933 (age 92); Manchester, England, United Kingdom
- Occupations: Comedian; actor; television personality; radio host; singer-songwriter; game show compere and panelist; commercial spokesperson
- Years active: 1960s-
- Known for: The Young Doctors as Bunny Howard; Blankety Blanks (as panelist)

Graham David Taylor (born 26 December 1933), known better as Ugly Dave Gray, is an English Australian comedian, actor, television personality, radio presenter, singer-songwriter, game show host and compere and panellist. He featured briefly in the TV serial The Young Doctors in 1976–1977 as publican Bunny Howard.

== Biography ==
=== Early life ===
Born Graham David Taylor, he transposed his first and middle names to come up with "Dave Gray". The "Ugly" part came from his first wife, Gail Gray, who joked that Gray was so ugly, he made her look attractive. He became active as a comedian in his native England in the 1960s, before arriving in Australia.

== Career ==
His first television gig in Australia was in 1972, when he hosted a version of the American television game show Beat the Clock. Although still working as a stand-up comedian, by 1976, Gray had taken a straight dramatic role as publican Bunny Howard in the early episodes of soap opera The Young Doctors. The following year, however, Gray appeared in his most popular role, as a regular panellist on the game show Blankety Blanks. He proceeded to leave his role in The Young Doctors after his initial 13-week contract expired to work on Blankety Blanks, with Graham Kennedy himself convincing Gray to do the game show. Gray had been receiving $100 a day for The Young Doctors; with Blankety Blanks paying $45 an episode, this represented a pay cut. Later, Gray signed with agent Harry M Miller, who negotiated the increased pay rate of $75 per episode, which remained until the series ended.

Gray was appointed Court Jester to 1977 King of Moomba Mickey Mouse (a controversial choice with some Melburnians, who preferred 'home-grown' Blinky Bill).

With his ever-present cigar, Gray became one of the most popular comedians on Australian TV. He became a game show host in his own right, helming Celebrity Tattle Tales in 1980, and Play Your Cards Right from 1984 to 1985. Gray also appeared in a series of commercials for Half Case supermarkets in the 1980s, as well as spots for other products, including an erectile dysfunction nasal spray in 2003.

In the 1980s, Gray also presented a drive-time radio program on 3UZ, with Mary Hardy.

== Biography and personal life ==
Ugly Dave Gray has two children, a daughter and a son. His son, also called Dave Gray, is following in his father's footsteps as a comedian.

In his 2005 autobiography, It's Funny Being Ugly, Gray said he was not invited to speak at Graham Kennedy's funeral, and indeed was not even told where the service was being held. He did attend after asking Phillip Brady for details.

In 1999, Gray announced that he wished to be cryogenically frozen after death.

== Albums ==
List of albums, with certifications
Title	Album details	Certifications
Gray and Spicy. Boom! Boom!	Released: 1977; Format: LP, Cassette; Label: Crest International (CRIN-TV-123)	AUS: Gold
Ugly Dave Gray's Singalong	Released: October 1977; Format: LP, Cassette; Label: Crest International (CRIN-TV-130)	

== Filmography ==
Title	Year	Role
In Melbourne Tonight (TV series)	1969–1970	Himself (Host)
The Graham Kennedy Show	1973–1975	Himself
The Ernie Sigley Show (TV series)	1974	Himself (Guest artist)
Ted Hamilton's Musical World (TV series)	1974	Himself
The Penthouse Club (TV series)	1974	Himself
Celebrity Squares (Australian version) (TV series)	1975–1976	Himself (Celebrity)
Dinah! (TV series)	1976	Himself
The Young Doctors (TV series)	1976–1977	Bunny Howard
All at Sea (TV movie)	1977	Dick Goscomb
Blankety Blanks (TV series)	1977–1978	Himself (Panellist)
Celebrity Tattle Tales (TV series)	1980	Himself (Host)
The Daryl Somers Show	1982–1983	Himself
Play Your Cards Right (TV series)	1984	Himself (Host)
Vaudeville (TV movie documentary)	1992	Himself
Frontline (TV series) (known as Behind the Frontline or Breaking News in the U.S.)	1994	Himself
Burke's Backyard	1996	Himself (Celebrity gardener)
The Micallef P(r)ogram(me) (TV series)	2001	Himself (Guest)
Gettin' Square (Movie)	2003	Jack Cullan
Double the Fist (TV series)	2004	Himself
Graham Kennedy: Farewell to the King (TV movie)	2005	Himself
Temptation (TV series)	2006	Himself (Contestant)
I Will Not Go Quietly (Documentary)	2010	Himself
The Hamster Wheel (TV series)	2011	Himself (Guest)

== References in popular culture ==
Gray was portrayed by Angus Sampson in the 2007 television movie The King, about the life of Graham Kennedy.
