= Robert Nesbitt (theatre director) =

Theatre director

Robert Nesbitt (11 January 1906 – 3 January 1995) was a theatre director, theatrical producer and impresario, particularly known for staging 25 instances of the Royal Variety Show.

Nesbitt was born on 11 January 1906 in London, England.

He was the Royal Variety Show's stage director in 1945, 1946, 1958 and 1961; and its producer from 1962 until 1976 and again in 1978. He staged and co-wrote the 1952 hit musical The Glorious Days starring Anna Neagle.

He once rejected an audition by Julie Andrews, but on the grounds of her age (she was only twelve at the time) rather than a deficiency of talent.

He appeared as a castaway on the BBC Radio programme Desert Island Discs on 27 January 1973.

He died on 3 January 1995.
