= The Lisbon Story (musical) =

1943 musical

- Original language: English
- Written by: Harold Purcell
- Music by: Harry Parr-Davies
- Genre: Musical
- Setting: Lisbon and Paris, summer 1942

Premiere
- Date: 31 May 1943
- Place: Imperial Theatre, Brighton

The Lisbon Story is a 1943 British musical composed by Harry Parr-Davies with a Book by Harold Purcell. It was produced by Edward Black. The plot is a wartime spy thriller set in Lisbon and Paris during the summer of 1942.

It premiered at the Imperial Theatre, Brighton before transferring to the West End where it ran for 493 performances at the London Hippodrome from 17 June 1943 to 8 July 1944. The original cast included Patricia Burke, Albert Lieven, Jack Livesey, Noele Gordon, Reginald Long and George Hayes. The song "Pedro the Fisherman" became a particular hit and was subsequently recorded by various artists including Richard Tauber, Gracie Fields, and Julie Andrews.

== Film Adaptation ==
In 1946 it was adapted into a film Lisbon Story produced by British National Films. Directed by Paul L. Stein it starred Burke, David Farrar and Walter Rilla with several other actors reprising their roles from the original stage work.

== Bibliography ==
- Goble, Alan. The Complete Index to Literary Sources in Film. Walter de Gruyter, 1999.
- Wearing, J.P. The London Stage 1940-1949: A Calendar of Productions, Performers, and Personnel. Rowman & Littlefield, 2014.
