= Michael Preston =

English actor (1933–2026)

Background information
- Born: Jack Charles Davis; 14 May 1933; Metropolitan Borough of Hackney, County of London, England
- Died: 8 June 2026 (aged 93) Florida, U.S.
- Occupations: Actor; singer; television host; boxer; cameraman
- Years active: 1958–2002
- Labels: Decca Records, Spin Records, Fable Records

Michael Preston (born Jack Charles Davis; 14 May 1933 – 8 June 2026) was an English-born singer and television and film character actor who worked in his native United Kingdom, Australia, and the United States. He is sometimes credited as Mike Preston.

== Early life ==
Preston was born in what was then the Metropolitan Borough of Hackney in the County of London, England on 14 May 1933. He was a boxer and cartoon cameraman, and then became a singer.

== Career ==
=== Music career ===
Preston launched a career as a singer after being discovered in the West End by agent record producer Denis Preston and appeared on the Oh Boy! television series, he released his first single on Decca Records, "A House, A Car And A Wedding Ring" by Jerry Lordan, and his third record, "Dirty Old Town" (1959) was produced by Joe Meek. Preston had three Top 40 hits in the UK Singles Chart, including reaching No. 12 with his cover version of The Fleetwoods "Mr. Blue" in November 1959, before emigrating to Australia, where he worked as a nightclub singer.

=== Television and film ===
Preston later became a host on television, and also an actor. He was a regular host on In Melbourne Tonight in 1968, and in 1969 was a guest celebrity on the game show The Celebrity Game; he went on to host the revival from 1976 to 1977.

His first ongoing starring role on television was in police drama series Homicide as Sen. Det. Bob Delaney from 1972 to 1973. He then had a recurring role in the soap opera Bellbird as Fr. John Kramer between 1974 and 1976.

He later took a lead role in the prison-based soap opera Punishment (1981), but this series was short-lived. In 1984, he had an ongoing role in Hot Pursuit, as the character Alec Shaw.

He made numerous guest appearances in television series both locally and internationally, including The A-Team, Max Headroom, Airwolf, Scarecrow and Mrs. King, Alien Nation, Ellen, and Highlander. He also made an appearance in the series Baywatch Nights.

Preston also acted in films. His first feature was Surabaya Conspiracy (1969); other film roles included playing Pappagallo in Mad Max 2 (1981), his best-known role, and Jared-Syn in the science fiction B-movie Metalstorm: The Destruction of Jared-Syn (1983). H

He was nominated for the 1979 AACTA Award for Best Actor in a Leading Role for his role in The Last of the Knucklemen and he won two Logies, in 1968 and 1969, for Most Popular Male Personality in Victoria.

== Personal life and death ==
Preston died in Florida, USA on 8 June 2026, at the age of 93.

== Selected filmography ==
- Climb Up the Wall (1960) – Himself (singing next to the Albert Memorial)
- Surabaya Conspiracy (1969) – Steven Blessing
- Homicide (1972–73) – Bob Delaney
- Barney (1976) – O'Shaughnessy
- The Last of the Knucklemen (1979) – Pansy
- Maybe This Time (1981) – Paddy
- Mad Max 2 (1981) – Pappagallo
- Duet for Four (1982) – Ray Martin
- Metalstorm: The Destruction of Jared-Syn (1983) – Jared-Syn
- A Caribbean Mystery (1983, TV movie) – Arthur Jackson
- Blade in Hong Kong (1985, TV movie) – Charters
- J.O.E. and the Colonel (1985, TV movie) – Schaefer
- The Return of Mickey Spillane's Mike Hammer (1986, TV movie) – David 'Dak' Anson Kola
- Hunter (1987) – Evans (as Mike Preston)
- Airwolf (1987, TV series) – Jack Ware
- Fame (1987, TV series) – Jack Ware
- Harry's Hong Kong (1987, TV movie) – Max Trumble
- The Long Journey Home (1987, TV movie) – Frank Mota
- Perry Mason: The Case of the Lady in the Lake (1988, TV movie) – Waiter
- Exile (1990, TV Movie) – Rupe Murphy
- Superboy (1990) – 2nd Police Officer
- Alien Nation (1990) – Rigac
- Jake and the Fatman (1991) – Vorster
- Renegade (1995, TV series) – Nick Schneider
- Highlander: The Series (1995) – Terrence Kincaid
- Steel (1997) – Mr. Weston (uncredited)
- The Getaway (2002, video game) – Harry

== Discography ==
- "A House, A Car And A Wedding Ring" / "My Lucky Love" (1958) – (US No. 93, Australia No. 18) (Decca)
- "Why, Why Why" / "Whispering Grass" (1958) (Decca)
- "In Surabaya" / "Dirty Old Town" (1959) (Decca)
- "Mr. Blue" / "Just Ask Your Heart" (1959) (UK No. 12) (Decca)
- "Too Old" / "A Girl Like You" (1960) (Decca)
- Four Songs By Ray Noble EP: "Love Is the Sweetest Thing" / "The Very Thought of You" / "The Touch of Your Lips" / "Not a Star in Sight" (1960) (Decca)
- "I'd Do Anything" / "Where Is Love" (1960) (UK No. 23) (Decca)
- "Togetherness" / "Farewell My Love" (1960) (UK No. 41) (Decca)
- "Marry Me" / "Girl Without a Heart" (1961) (UK No. 14) (Decca)
- "It's All Happening" / "Just As I Am" (1961) (Decca)
- Marry Me EP: "Am I Wasting My Time On You" / "Where Is Love" / "An Ordinary Couple" / "Marry Me" (1961) (Decca)
- "As If I Didn't Know" / "Game of Chance" (1961) (Decca)
- "I've Got All the Time in the World" / "Innocent Eyes" (1962) (Decca)
- "My First Love Affair (Un Premier Amour)" / "Suspicion" (1962) (Decca)
- "It's a Sin to Tell a Lie" / "Careless Love" (1962) (Decca)
- "Punish Her" / "From the Very First Rose" (1963) (Decca)
- "Cry Baby" / "Write to Me" (1963) (Decca)
- "No Strings" / "Nobody Told Me" (1964) (Decca)
- "Till Then My Love" / "I Know" (1965)
- "Our Love Will Go On" / "Forgive Me" (1966) (Emerald)
- "Dear Heart" / "Wonderful, Wonderful World" (1968) (Australia No. 20, Kent chart, No. 34 Go-Set chart) (Spin)
- "Christmas Alphabet" / "Smile" (1968) (Australia No. 71 Kent chart) (Spin)
- "Buona Sera Mrs. Campbell" / "Another Go Round" (1969) (Australia No. 64 Kent chart) (Spin)
- "Cellophane Disguise" / "The Honey-Wind Blows" (1970) (Spin)
- "Why" / "Pianissimo" (1972) (Australia No. 70) (Fable Records)

== See also ==
- List of artists under the Decca Records label
