= Harry Parr-Davies =

Welsh composer (1914–1955)

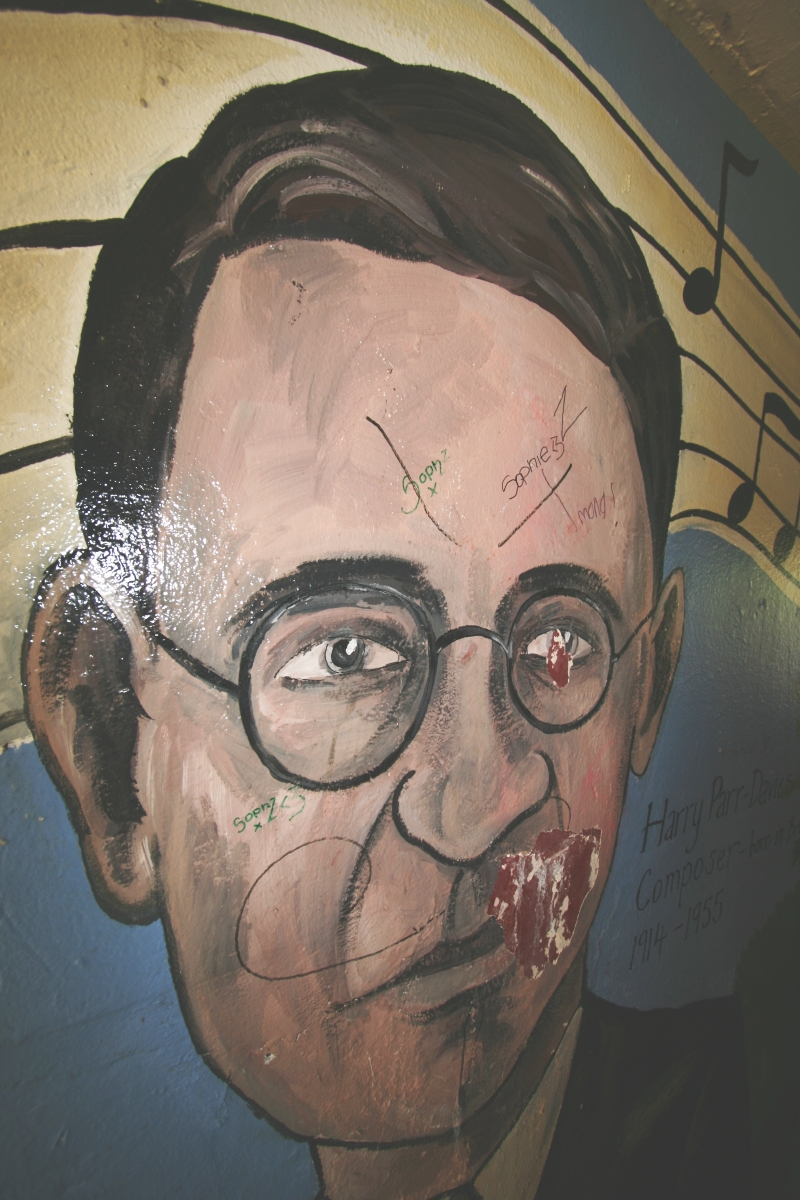
Mural painting of Harry Parr-Davies near Neath

Harry Parr-Davies (24 May 1914 – 14 October 1955) was a Welsh composer and songwriter.

He was born Harry Parr Davies in Briton Ferry, Neath, South Wales, and was educated at Neath Grammar School. He was considered a musical prodigy, having composed entire operettas by the time he was in his teens. He came to the attention of composer Sir Walford Davies, who encouraged him to study music at Oxford or Cambridge. However, his early professional success meant that this opportunity was not pursued. By the age of fourteen, he had already composed six songs and soon left Wales to build on his early achievements.

In 1931, in an uncharacteristic moment of assertiveness, he managed to gain access to the dressing room of the singing star Gracie Fields at London’s Winter Garden Theatre. Starting in 1934, he worked as Fields' accompanist. He also wrote songs for Jack Buchanan, Anna Neagle, and others. His best-known songs included "Pedro the Fisherman," "Wish Me Luck as You Wave Me Goodbye," and "Sing as We Go."

He provided additional lyrics for Jan Peerce's best-selling recording of "Bluebird of Happiness," with music by Sandor Harmati and original lyrics by Edward Heyman.

In 1939, the show Black Velvet featured Parr-Davies's song "Crash, Bang, I Want to Go Home." Other wartime shows that included his work were Big Top, Happidrome (starring Tessie O'Shea), Full Swing, The Knight Was Bold, and The Lisbon Story. During the war, he was seconded from his regiment to join Gracie Fields in ENSA.

In 1944, his musical, Jenny Jones, which had a Welsh setting, was a flop, but it was followed by the successful revue Fine Feathers (1945), Her Excellency (1949) starring Cicely Courtneidge, and Dear Miss Phoebe (1950). He collaborated on the hit 1952 musical The Glorious Days, a vehicle for Anna Neagle.

In 1944, his musical Jenny Jones, set in Wales, was a flop. However, it was followed by the successful revue Fine Feathers (1945), Her Excellency (1949), starring Cicely Courtneidge, and Dear Miss Phoebe (1950). He also collaborated on the hit 1952 musical The Glorious Days, which was a vehicle for Anna Neagle.

Parr-Davies was at the peak of his success when he died on 14 October 1955 from an internal hemorrhage caused by a perforated ulcer. According to his sister, Billie David, he had declined to seek medical attention for this condition. He died at his London home in Knightsbridge and is buried beside his father and mother (whom he outlived) in Oystermouth Cemetery near Swansea.

== Songs by Parr-Davies used in George Formby films ==
- "Bell Bottom George" (Park/Parr-Davies)
- "If I Had a Girl Like You" (Park/Parr-Davies)
- "In My Little Snapshot Album" (Harper/Haines/Parr-Davies)
- "It's in the Air" (Parr-Davies)
- "Noughts and Crosses" (Hunter/Parr-Davies)
- "Swim Little Fish" (Park/Parr-Davies)
- "Your Way Is My Way" (Parr-Davies)
