= Magyar Melody =

1938 British musical

Magyar Melody is a 1938 musical written by Eric Maschwitz and George Posford with music by Posford and Bernard Grun. The musical was adapted from a play by Maschwitz, Fred Thompson and Guy Bolton.

Magyar Melody (revised from an earlier production named Paprika) premiered at the Manchester Opera House on 29 November 1938, before moving His Majesty's Theatre, London, in January 1939, where it ran for 105 nights.

Magyar Melody is notable as the first full-length musical to be shown on British television, on 27 March 1939.
