= John Harlow (director) =

English film director (1896–1977)

- Born: 19 August 1896; Ross-on-Wye, Herefordshire, England
- Died: 1977 (aged 80 or 81); London, England
- Occupation: Film director
- Years active: 1933–1954

John Harlow (19 August 1896 – 1977) was an English film director, active from the 1930s to the 1950s. Harlow worked for smaller studios, mainly in crime/thriller genre potboilers, with his better known films including Candles at Nine (1944), the Sexton Blake thrillers Meet Sexton Blake and The Echo Murders (both 1945), Appointment with Crime (1946) and the 1947 reincarnation drama While I Live. He also directed two late entries in the popular, if critically unappreciated, Old Mother Riley series.

== Filmography (director) ==
- 1933: My Lucky Star
- 1934: Master and Man
- 1941: Spellbound (AKA ' Passing Clouds ')
- 1942: This Was Paris
- 1943: The Dark Tower
- 1944: Candles at Nine
- 1944: Headline
- 1945: The Agitator
- 1945: Meet Sexton Blake!
- 1945: The Echo Murders
- 1946: Appointment with Crime
- 1947: Green Fingers
- 1947: While I Live
- 1949: Old Mother Riley's New Venture
- 1950: Old Mother Riley Headmistress
- 1953: Those People Next Door
- 1953: The Blue Parrot
- 1954: Dangerous Cargo
- 1954: Delayed Action
