= Blankety Blanks (Australian game show) =

1977 Australian TV game show

- Also known as: Graham Kennedy’s Blankety Blanks
- Genre: Game Show
- Based on: Match Game by Frank Wayne
- Directed by: Alan Catt
- Presented by: Graham Kennedy; Daryl Somers; Shane Bourne
- Narrated by: Don Blake; John Blackman; Pete Smith
- Theme music composer: Jack Grimsley
- Country of origin: Australia
- Original language: English
- No. of seasons: 2

Production
- Executive producer: Bill Mason
- Producer: Tony Connelly
- Production locations: Sydney, New South Wales (1977–1978); Melbourne, Victoria (1985–1986, 1996–1997)
- Running time: 30 minutes

Original release
- Network: Network Ten
- Release: 24 January 1977 – 3 November 1978
- Network: Nine Network
- Release: 1985 – 1986
- Release: 1996 – 1997

Blankety Blanks is an Australian game show based on the American game show Match Game. It was hosted by Graham Kennedy on the 0-10 Network from 1977 to 1978.

Blankety Blanks had a two-season run from 1977 to 1978. It was screened at a rate of five, thirty-minute episodes each week, stripped across an early evening timeslot. In Sydney and Melbourne, it was broadcast in the 7pm timeslot across both seasons. It was a ratings success, beating the flagship current affairs programs Willesee at Seven on the Seven Network and A Current Affair on the Nine Network, and on occasions achieving ratings in the low 40s. It was only after this ratings success that Network Ten revealed Kennedy was paid an unprecedented $1 million per season.

In 1978, Kennedy won a TV Week Gold Logie Award for Most Popular Personality on Australian Television. When Kennedy had a bout of pneumonia, announcer Don Blake was forced to host the show for an episode.

== Gameplay ==
Two contestants, including a returning champion, competed. The contestants were always a man and a woman – at no point during the series did two people of the same gender compete. The object was to match the answers of the six celebrity panelists to fill-in-the-blank statements.

The main game was played in two rounds. The challenger was given a choice of two statements labelled either "A" or "B." Kennedy then read the statement. Many of the show's questions were designed as double entendres, such as "Joan and Paul went to bed and Joan asked Paul to (BLANK) her".

The celebrity panelists wrote their answers on cards, after which the contestant gave their answer. Kennedy then asked each celebrity in turn, beginning in the upper left hand corner, to reveal their response. The contestant earned one point for a matching answer (or reasonably similar as determined by the adjudicator – producer Tony Connelly who was dubbed by Kennedy "Tony the moustache twirler").

After completion of the round, Kennedy read the question on the other card for the returning champion and play was identical.

The challenger again began Round 2, with two new questions, unless he/she matched everyone in the first round. Only panelists that a contestant didn't previously match played this round. If the players tied with the same score at the end of the round the scores were reset to 0–0. Play continued until there was a clear winner.

The winner of the game went on to play the Super Match. The contestant had to match a word in a fill-in-the-blank phrase with the most popular response given in an audience survey. The contestant could consult three panelists for suggestions. The most popular answer in the survey was worth $100, the second-most popular $50, and the third most popular $25. The contestant won the amount of the answer they matched with.

If a contestant failed to match any of the three answers, the bonus round ended. If successful the contestant had the opportunity to win 10 times that amount (either $250, $500 & $1,000 depending on the bonus round) in the "Head-To-Head Match". In this part of the game, they must match another fill-in-the-blank response with a celebrity panelist of his or her choice. If successful, he/she won the money accumulated in both parts of the round. Either way, the winning contestant could keep playing until defeated by another challenger.

== Running gags ==
Many questions were quotations of a fictional character named Cyril, and would begin "Cyril said..." with the quotation recited by Kennedy in a stereotypical gay male voice (Cyril was Kennedy's middle name). Another recurring character in the questions was Dumb Dora – a joke borrowed from Match Game. A recurring comedy skit between Kennedy and Gray involved discussion about a man named "Dick", leading to "Did Dick?", "Dick did!" exchanges between Kennedy and Ugly Dave Gray.

Kennedy's risqué brand of humour often nudged the boundaries of contemporary Australian broadcasting standards. Peter Hough was the crew member behind the show's sets pulling the lever that uncovered the correct answers on the board. During the second episode he was dubbed "Peter the Phantom Puller" by Kennedy. To reveal each answer in turn, Kennedy would call out "Peter could you have a pull", "Pull it Peter!", etc.

In one episode Kennedy came on with a prepared list of "rude" words which were deemed acceptable to be spoken on-air. Throughout the episode, he would suddenly launch into a chant of "wee poo bum, wee poo bum!".

== History ==
The series was a Reg Grundy production based on the long-running American game show Match Game, which had been created by Mark Goodson and Bill Todman. Indeed, the Blankety Blanks set looked almost identical to its American counterpart. The series also used a similarly stylised logo.

One of the conditions Kennedy requested when he started Blankety Blanks was the right to choose the members of the panel. If they worked well they would be retained, but if they didn't, they wouldn't be asked back.

The first episode aired on TEN-10 Sydney on Monday, 24 January 1977 at 7:30pm, where it was telecast Monday to Friday. After six weeks of broadcasting at 7:30pm the show was moved into the 7pm slot, where it remained through to the end of its first season on Friday 2 December 1977. After summer break, the show returned to TEN-10 on Monday 9 January 1978 and remained at 7pm Monday to Friday for its entire second season.

In October 1978 the series came up for renewal, and Ten was keen to renew the series. Kennedy consulted key panelist Ugly Dave Gray about the potential renewal. Gray felt he had used every joke he had done in his career and exhausted the comic potential of the formula and expressed a desire to not continue with the series. Kennedy observed that the ratings were down from earlier figures; although earlier figures were unusually high (ratings in the 40s), recent figures in the 30s range were still extremely high. In any event, Kennedy informed Ten that he would not be continuing with the series, and the show ended its run on TEN-10 Sydney on Friday 3 November 1978.

The series has been repeated many times since its original run. It was shown on all four Network Ten stations, particularly ATV-10 Melbourne, numerous times between January 1985 and January 1987. In the 2000s it aired on Foxtel's TV1. In January 2009, The Comedy Channel began screening back-to-back episodes on Friday nights.

A DVD set of 30 episodes was released in late 2005.

== Revivals ==
The game show has been revived twice in Australia since the Graham Kennedy series. The first of these, a 1985-1986 version hosted by Daryl Somers on the Nine Network, had moderate success.

A second revival hosted by Shane Bourne followed in 1996–97, again on the Nine Network. Its regular panelists included Marty Fields, Rhonda Burchmore, Tim Smith, Kerri-Anne Kennerley, Nicky Buckley, Ian "Molly" Meldrum, Jane Turner and Sam Newman. This had slightly more success than the 80s revival, lasting two seasons.

Both of these versions followed the same format as the Kennedy version, but with a top prize of $5,000 (Audience Match amounts were $500–$250–$100, equaling those from the 1973–1982 American versions of Match Game). In the second round of the 1990s revival, both players and the panel wrote their answers to the same statement and the player who played second in the first round chose whether to play with the top or bottom row and each match scored 2 points.

== See also ==
- List of Australian game shows
- Match Game
- Blankety Blank
