= List of films and television shows shot at Clarendon Road Studios =

This is a chronological list of films and television shows that have been shot at any of the studios that have existed at the site adjacent to Clarendon Road, Borehamwood, England, since 1984 known as BBC Elstree Centre. The site is now also adjacent to Eldon Avenue, which did not exist when the site first opened as a film studio in 1914, and was the first of several sites collectively known as "Elstree Studios".

In 1960, the film studios were converted to television studios used by the former ITV contractor ATV and, since 1984, by the BBC.

== Neptune Film Studios (1914–17) ==
The Neptune Film Company opened the first studios in Borehamwood in 1914. All films listed below were silent movies produced by the company, and it is assumed they were shot at the company's studios.

- The Harbour Lights (1914)
- In the Ranks (1914)
- Enoch Arden (1914)
- The Coal King (1915)
- Flying from Justice (1915)
- The Little Minister (1915)
- A Rogue's Wife (1915)
- What Every Woman Knows (1917)

== Ideal Film Studios (1917–24) ==
The Ideal Film Company bought the studios in 1917. All films listed below were silent movies produced by the company between 1917 and 1924. It is assumed they were shot at the company's studios, although it is possible that a small number were shot elsewhere.

- Justice (1917)
- Tom Jones (1917)
- The Gay Lord Quex (1917)
- Profit and the Loss (1917)
- Doing His Bit (1917)
- Red Pottage (1918)
- My Sweetheart (1918)
- God and the Man (1918)
- The Life Story of David Lloyd George (1918, released 1996)
- The Chinese Puzzle (1919)
- The Impossible Woman (1919)
- The Ever Open Door (1920)
- Colonel Newcombe, the Perfect Gentleman (1920)
- Torn Sails (1920)
- Mr. Gilfil's Love Story (1920)
- General Post (1920)
- Bleak House (1920)
- Lady Audley's Secret (1920)
- Build Thy House (1920)
- Ernest Maltravers (1920)
- Beyond the Dreams of Avarice (1920)
- The Manchester Man (1920)
- The Twelve Pound Look (1920)
- The Diamond Necklace (1921)
- Money (1921)
- The Will (1921)
- A Woman of No Importance (1921)
- The Rotters (1921)
- The Adventures of Mr. Pickwick (1921)
- Married Life (1921)
- Single Life (1921)
- Sybil (1921)
- The Prince and the Beggarmaid (1921)
- The Bachelor's Club (1921)
- Belphegor the Mountebank (1921)
- Handy Andy (1921)
- The Old Wives' Tale (1921)
- Sonia (1921)
- Demos (1921)
- The Old Country (1921)
- All Sorts and Conditions of Men (1921)
- The Card (1922)
- Sinister Street (1922)
- Shirley (1922)
- A Master of Craft (1922)
- Bentley's Conscience (1922)
- The Lonely Lady of Grosvenor Square (1922)
- The Pauper Millionaire (1922)
- A Bill of Divorcement (1922)
- The Grass Orphan (1922)
- Diana of the Crossways (1922)
- Hutch Stirs 'em Up (1923)
- Through Fire and Water (1923)
- This Freedom (1923)
- The Harbour Lights (1923)
- I Will Repay (1923)
- The Loves of Mary, Queen of Scots (1923)
- The Great Well (1924)
- Old Bill Through the Ages (1924)
- Hurricane Hutch in Many Adventures (1924)

== Blattner Studios (1928–34) ==
In 1928, the studios were sold to Ludwig Blattner, who installed sound recording equipment. The following films were shot at the studios.

- Splinters (British and Dominions; 1929)
- Rookery Nook (British and Dominions; 1930)
- Wolves (British and Dominions; 1930)
- Betrayal (Fogwell Films; 1932)
- A Lucky Sweep (National Talkies; 1932)
- Come Into My Parlour (Gem Productions; 1932)
- Send 'em Back Half Dead (Cecil Landeau; 1933)
- My Lucky Star (Masquerader; 1933)
- The Tell-Tale Heart (Clifton-Hurst Productions; 1934)

== Rock Studios (1934–39) ==
In 1934, the studios were leased to Joe Rock Productions, who bought them in 1936, and added four large stages, including the "C" and "D" stages that are still in use today. The following films were shot at Rock Studios.

- The Stoker (Leslie Fuller; 1935)
- Everything Is Rhythm (Joe Rock; 1936)
- Excuse My Glove (Alexander Film Productions; 1936)
- The Luck of the Irish (British & Dominions/Paramount; 1936)
- One Good Turn (Joe Rock; 1936)
- House Broken (British & Dominions/Paramount; 1936)
- The Man Behind the Mask (Joe Rock; 1936)
- Captain Bill (Leslie Fuller; 1936)
- Boys Will Be Girls (Leslie Fuller; 1937)
- Cotton Queen (Rock Studios; 1937)
- Darby and Joan (Rock Studios; 1937)
- The Edge of the World (Rock Studios; 1937)
- Live Again (Morgan Productions; 1937)
- Love at Sea (British & Dominions/Paramount; 1937)
- Sing as You Swing (Rock Studios; 1937)
- Stardust (Morgan; 1937)
- Two on a Doorstep (British & Dominions/Paramount; 1936)
- The Reverse Be My Lot (Rock Productions; 1937)
- Rhythm Racketeer (Rock Productions; 1937)
- The Singing Cop (Warner Bros./First National; 1938)
- Sons of the Sea (British Consolidated; 1939)
- Meet Maxwell Archer (RKO; 1940)

== British National Studios (1939–53) ==
The studios were bought by the British National Films Company in 1939. All films listed below were produced by the company, except those indicated otherwise.

- The Fourth Estate (Realist Film Unit; 1940)
- The Common Touch (1941)
- Love on the Dole (1941)
- Old Mother Riley in Business (1941)
- Crook's Tour (1941)
- Old Mother Riley's Ghosts (1941)
- This England (1941)
- Penn of Pennsylvania (1941)
- Old Mother Riley's Circus (1941)
- Those Kids from Town (1942)
- Much Too Shy (Columbia British Productions; 1942)
- One of Our Aircraft Is Missing (British National Films/Archers Film Productions; 1942)
- Salute John Citizen (1942)
- Let the People Sing (1942)
- Old Mother Riley Overseas (1943)
- Old Mother Riley Detective (1943)
- When We Are Married (1943)
- The Butler's Dilemma (Shaftesbury Films; 1943)
- Battle for Music (Strand Film Company; 1943)
- Theatre Royal (1943)
- The Dummy Talks (1943)
- The Shipbuilders (1943)
- Welcome, Mr. Washington (1944)
- Heaven Is Round the Corner (1944)
- Give Me the Stars (1944)
- Medal for the General (1944)
- Candles at Nine (1944)
- Strawberry Roan (1945)
- Meet Sexton Blake! (1945)
- The World Owes Me a Living (1945)
- Waltz Time (1945)
- The Agitator (1945)
- Twilight Hour (1945)
- Latin Quarter (1945)
- Murder in Reverse (1945)
- The Echo Murders (Strand Film Company; 1945)
- Old Mother Riley at Home (1945)
- Lisbon Story (1946)
- Meet the Navy (1946)
- The Laughing Lady (1946)
- Appointment with Crime (1946)
- Spring Song (1946)
- Woman to Woman (1947)
- Green Fingers (1947)
- Dual Alibi (1947)
- The Ghosts of Berkeley Square (1947)
- Mrs. Fitzherbert (1947)
- Loyal Heart (1947)
- The Three Weird Sisters (1948)
- Counterblast (1948)
- Uneasy Terms (1948)
- No Room at the Inn (1948)
- The Elusive Pimpernel (London Films; 1950)

== National Studios (1953–58) ==
In 1953, the studios were bought by Douglas Fairbanks Jr..

- Douglas Fairbanks Presents (Douglas Fairbanks Productions for NBC; 1953–1957; TV series shot on film)
- The Count of Monte Cristo (later episodes) (ITC Entertainment/TPA for ATV/ITV; 1956; TV series shot on film)
- To Dorothy a Son (British Lion Films; 1954)
- Police Dog (Douglas Fairbanks Productions; 1955)
- Brothers in Law (British Lion Films; 1956)
- Port of Escape (Wellington Films; 1956)
- Not Wanted on Voyage (Byron Films; 1957)
- The Scamp (James Lawrie; 1957)
- The Strange World of Planet X (Artistes Alliance; 1958)
- The Duke Wore Jeans (Insignia Films; 1958)
- Battle of the V-1 (Eros Films/John Bash Films Corporation; 1958)
- The Giant Behemoth (Artistes Alliance; 1959)
- The Night We Dropped a Clanger (Four Star Films; 1959)
- The Treasure of San Teresa (Beaconsfield Productions/Kurt Ulrich Filmproduktion/Orbit Films; 1959)
- Bobbikins (1959)
- Too Young to Love (Welbeck Films; 1959)
- Shield of Faith (Religious Films; 1959)
- Be Not Afraid (Religious Films; 1959)
- Desert Mice (Sydney Box Associates; 1960)

== ATV Elstree Studios (1958–84) ==
The studios that the ITV contractor ATV bought in 1958 were film studios and the first TV shows made here were shot on film.

- The Adventures of William Tell (ITC Entertainment for ATV/ITV and NTA Film Network; 1958–1959)
- H.G. Wells' Invisible Man (ITC Entertainment for ATV/ITV and CBS; 1958–1959)

During 1960–1961, all the soundstages were converted to video TV studios. All shows listed below were video productions by ATV for ITV unless indicated otherwise.

- The Jo Stafford Show (1961)
- Emergency Ward 10 (1961–1967)
- Two of a Kind (1961–1968)
- On the Braden Beat (1962–1967)
- Hancock (1963)
- The Larkins (1963–1964)
- Sergeant Cork (1963–1968)
- The Plane Makers / The Power Game (1963–1969)
- The Des O'Connor Show (1963–1973)
- Love Story (1963–1974)
- Mrs Thursday (1966–1967)
- George and the Dragon (1966–1968)
- The Golden Shot (1967)
- The Heart of Showbusiness (1967)
- Market in Honey Lane (1967–1969)
- This Is Tom Jones (ATV for ITV and ABC; 1969–1971)
- Timeslip (1970–1971)
- The Marty Feldman Comedy Machine (1971)
- General Hospital (1972–1979)
- Julie on Sesame Street (ITC Entertainment for ATV/ITV and ABC; 1973)
- James Paul McCartney (ATV for ABC and ITV; 1973)
- Long Day's Journey into Night (ITV; 1973)
- Thriller (1973–1976)
- Pipkins (1973–1981)
- Antony and Cleopatra (1974)
- Father Brown (1974)
- Carry On Laughing (1975)
- Edward the Seventh (1975)
- Down the 'Gate (1975–1976)
- Celebrity Squares (1975–1979)
- The Cedar Tree (1976–1979)
- The Muppet Show (ITC Entertainment/Henson Associates for ATV/ITV and CBS; 1976–1981)
- Bing Crosby's Merrie Olde Christmas (ITC Entertainment/Konigsberg Company/Smith-Hemion Productions for CBS and ATV/ITV; 1977)
- A Bunch of Fives (1977–1978)
- A Sharp Intake of Breath (1977–1981)
- Will Shakespeare (1978)
- Bonkers! (1979)
- Sapphire & Steel (ATV/Central for ITV; 1979–1982)
- For Maddie with Love (1980)
- Young at Heart (ATV/Central for ITV; 1980–1982)
- Family Fortunes (ATV/Central for ITV; 1980–1983)
- Diamonds (1981)
- Shine on Harvey Moon (Central for ITV; 1982–1983)
- Auf Wiedersehen, Pet (Central for ITV; 1983)
- Luna (Central for ITV; 1983)
- Cuffy (Central for ITV; 1983)
- Blockbusters (Central for ITV; 1983)
- I Thought You’d Gone (Central for ITV, 1984)

== BBC Elstree Centre (1984–present) ==
The BBC bought the studios in 1984. At first the studios were used for BBC shows only, but later they became available for hire by other production companies and broadcasters. Today they are run by BBC Studioworks.

- The Tripods (BBC/Seven Network; 1984–1985)
- EastEnders (BBC One; 1985–present)
- Grange Hill (BBC1; 1985–2002)
- The Tale of the Bunny Picnic (Henson Associates for HBO and BBC1; 1986)
- 'Allo 'Allo! (BBC1; 1988–1989)
- Going for Gold (Reg Grundy Productions for BBC1; 1988–1992)
- BBC Newsroom South East (BBC London and South East; 1989–2001)
- Opportunity Knocks (BBC1; 1990)
- You Rang, M'Lord? (BBC1; 1990–1993)
- Big Break (BBC1; 1991–1993)
- Top of the Pops (BBC1; 1991–2001 2018)
- Hangar 17 (BBC1; 1992–1994)
- Incredible Games (BBC2; 1994)
- Kilroy (BBC One; 1999–2002)
- Holby City (BBC One; 1999–2022)
- Tikkabilla (CBeebies; 2002–2005)
- Bamzooki (CBBC; (2004–2006)
- Show Me Show Me (CBeebies; 2009–2015)
- Relic: Guardians of the Museum (BBC One; 2010)
- Odd One In (Zeppotron for ITV1; 2010–2011)
- Rock & Chips (Shazam for BBC One; 2010–2011)
- Sadie J (CBBC; 2011–2013)
- A League of Their Own (CPL Productions for Sky One; 2011–2015)
- The IT Crowd (Talkback for Channel 4; 2013)
- That Puppet Game Show (The Jim Henson Company for BBC One; 2013–2014)
- Children in Need (BBC One; 2013–2020)
- Fake Reaction (STV Productions for ITV2; 2014)
- Live at the Electric (Avalon Television for BBC Three; 2014)
- Keep It in the Family (Over the Top Productions for ITV; 2014–2015)
- Celebrity Juice (Thames for ITV2; 2014–2016, 2021–2022)
- Goodness Gracious Me (BBC Two, 2015)
- Tenable (Initial for ITV; 2016)
- Lip Sync Battle UK (Whizz Kid Entertainment for Channel 5; 2016–2018)
- Let's Sing and Dance (Whizz Kid Entertainment for BBC One; 2017)
- Not Going Out (Avalon/Arlo for BBC One; 2017)
- Play to the Whistle (Hungry Bear Media for ITV; 2017)
- Room 101 (Hat Trick Productions for BBC One; 2017)
- Sam Smith at the BBC (BBC One; 2017)
- Dara O Briain's Go 8 Bit (DLT Entertainment for Dave; 2017–2018)
- The Big Fat Quiz of the Year (Hotsauce TV for Channel 4; 2018)
- Celebrity Game Night (Monkey for Channel 5; 2018)
- Through the Keyhole (Talkback for ITV; 2018–2019)
- Blockbusters (Thames for Comedy Central; 2019)
- 8 Out of 10 Cats (Zeppotron for E4; 2019)
- The Ranganation (Zeppotron for BBC Two; 2019)
- The Jonathan Ross Show (Hotsauce TV and ITV Studios for ITV; 2019, 2021)
- Comic Relief (BBC One; 2019–2021)
- Mock the Week (Angst Productions for BBC Two; 2019–2021)
- Take Off with Bradley & Holly (Hungry Bear Media for BBC One; 2019–2021)
- Crazy Delicious (Optomen for Channel 4; 2020)
- Kate & Koji (Hat Trick Productions for ITV; 2020–2022)
- Never Mind the Buzzcocks (Talkback for Sky Max; 2021)
- Limitless Win (Hello Dolly and Mitre Studios for ITV; 2022–)

== See also ==
- Category:Films shot at Rock Studios (1928–1939)
- Category:Films shot at British National Studios (1939–1958)
- Category:Television shows shot at British National Studios (before 1958)
- Category:Television shows shot at ATV Elstree Studios (1958–1983)
- Category:Television shows shot at BBC Elstree Centre (since 1984)
- Chronological lists of productions shot at the other Elstree studios:
  - List of films and television shows shot at Elstree Studios
  - Gate Studios § Films shot at the studios
  - British and Dominions Imperial Studios § Films shot at Imperial Studios
  - List of films shot at MGM-British Studios, Elstree
  - New Elstree Studios § List of films shot at New Elstree Studios
