= Elstree Studios =

8 film & TV studios in Borehamwood, UK

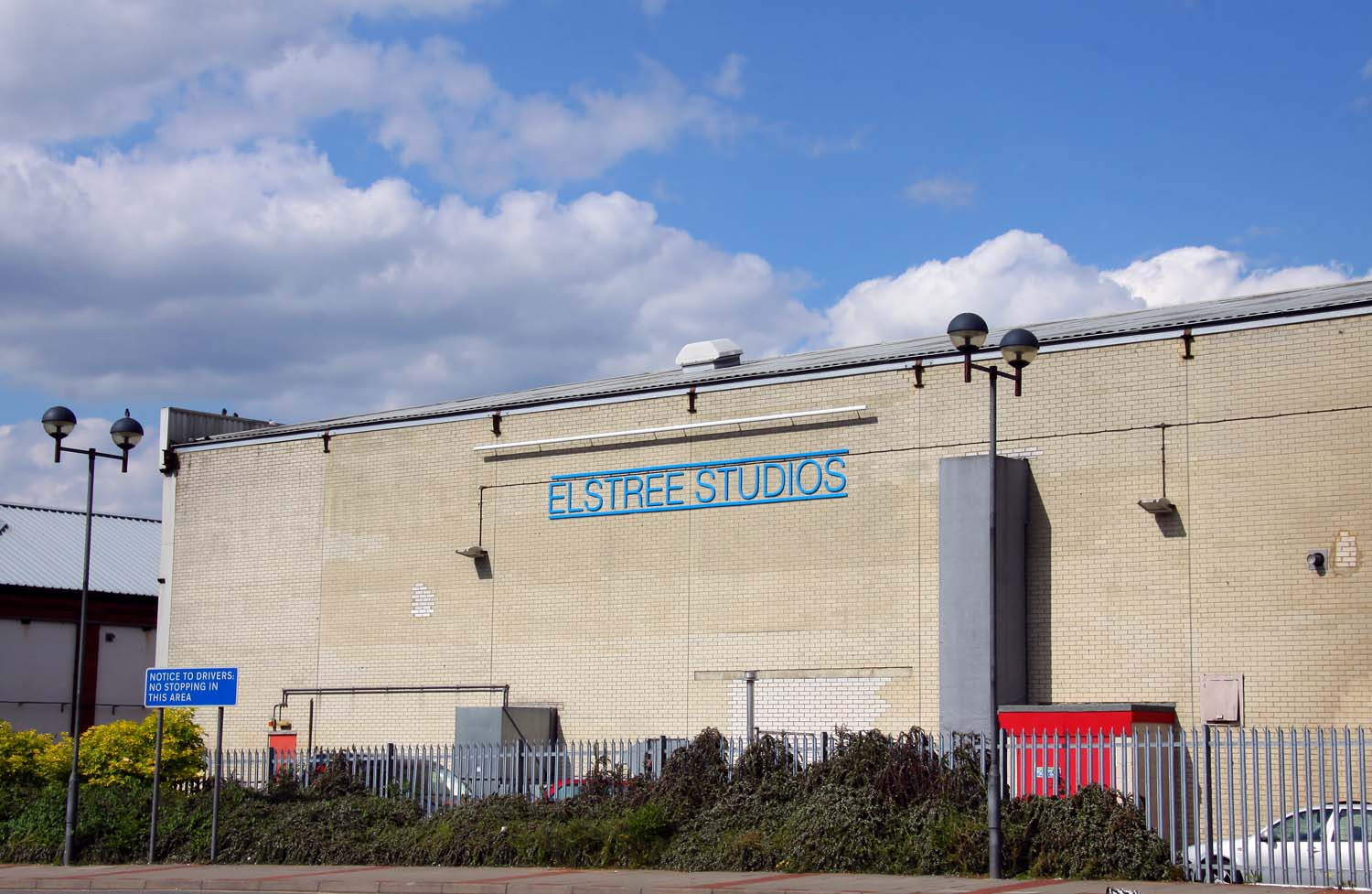
- One of the many Elstree Studios, at Shenley Road, Borehamwood

- Location within Hertfordshire

General information
- Type: Group of many film and television studios
- Location: Elstree and Borehamwood, Hertfordshire, United Kingdom
- Coordinates: 51.658°N 0.276°W
- Construction started: 1914

Elstree Studios is a generic term which can refer to several current and demolished British film studios and television studios based in or around the town of Borehamwood and village of Elstree in Hertfordshire, England. Production studios have been located in the area since 1914 when film production began there.

Films shot at Elstree include: Britain's first sound film, Alfred Hitchcock's Blackmail (1929), The Dam Busters (1955), Moby Dick (1956), Summer Holiday (1963), 2001: A Space Odyssey (1968), Where Eagles Dare (1968), Goodbye, Mr. Chips (1969), Star Wars (1977), The Shining (1980) and the Indiana Jones films.

Television shows shot at Elstree include The Avengers, Danger Man, The Prisoner, UFO, Robot Wars, The Muppet Show, EastEnders, Holby City, Who Wants to Be a Millionaire? and Big Brother. The music video for Queen's "Bohemian Rhapsody" was filmed at Elstree in November 1975.

Currently, two major sites remain in use in Borehamwood: Elstree Studios on Shenley Road and the BBC Elstree Centre on Eldon Avenue. A third, Sky Studios Elstree is currently under construction, whilst a fourth Millennium Studios still exists in a much reduced capacity where it trades as Studio 2000.

== History and facilities ==
Studio
Site of former studio
Shown within Elstree and Borehamwood parish

Despite being called Elstree Studios, only one studio has ever been located in Elstree itself, the remainder residing in the adjacent town of Borehamwood. When the studios were being established, Elstree was significantly larger than Borehamwood, while today Borehamwood is larger. Nevertheless the studios are still referred to as Elstree Studios.

The civil parish that contains the town was Elstree parish. The local railway station was originally named Elstree, but today called Elstree & Borehamwood. The local telephone exchange was also called Elstree.

=== Eldon Avenue Studios, Borehamwood ===
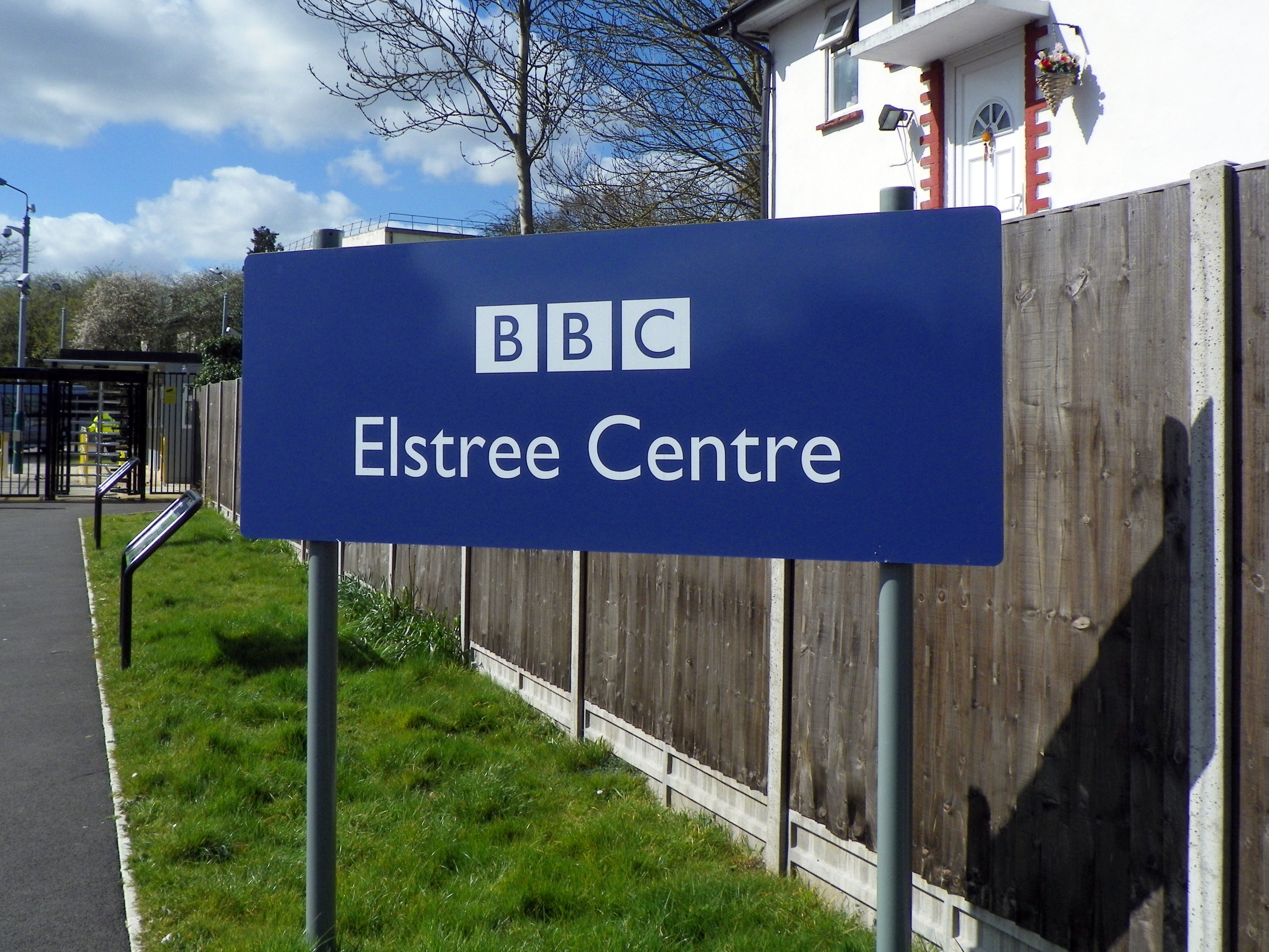
Entrance to BBC Elstree Centre

The Neptune Film Company opened the first studios in Borehamwood in 1914. Production ceased during 1917, and the studio was sold to the Ideal Film Company who used the site up until 1924.

During 1928, the studio was sold to Ludwig Blattner who connected it to the electricity mains and introduced a German system of sound recording. The Blattner Studio was leased to Joe Rock Productions during 1934, which purchased the site two years later. Rock Productions built four new large stages. The site was again sold, and taken over by the British National Films Company between 1939 and 1948, although during this period a large portion of the studio was taken over by the British government for war work.

During 1953, the studios were bought by Douglas Fairbanks, Jr., mainly for television production and were later sold to Lew Grade's Associated Television (ATV). The Eldon Avenue centre became the main television production hub for ATV. The smaller Studios A and B were used for schools and sitcoms, while Studio C was a drama studio. Studio D, with permanent audience seating, was used for light entertainment programmes such as the ATV Morecambe and Wise series Two of a Kind (1961–68) and The Muppet Show (1976–81).

When ATV was restructured as Central Independent Television in 1982, one of the conditions of its licence renewal by the governing body of the ITV network, the Independent Broadcasting Authority, was that ATV should leave any London-centric facilities and become more focused on the Midlands, the part of the United Kingdom to which it broadcast ITV programmes. They remained in operation by Central up until July 1983.

The BBC bought the Elstree site in 1984 to produce its new soap opera EastEnders (first aired on 19 February 1985). In addition to EastEnders, many other programmes have been made there including Top of the Pops, 'Allo 'Allo!, You Rang, M'Lord?, Grange Hill, Hangar 17 and Holby City. Most of the site is now devoted to EastEnders production, but Studio D is available for hire via BBC Studioworks.

=== Elstree Studios, Shenley Rd, Borehamwood ===
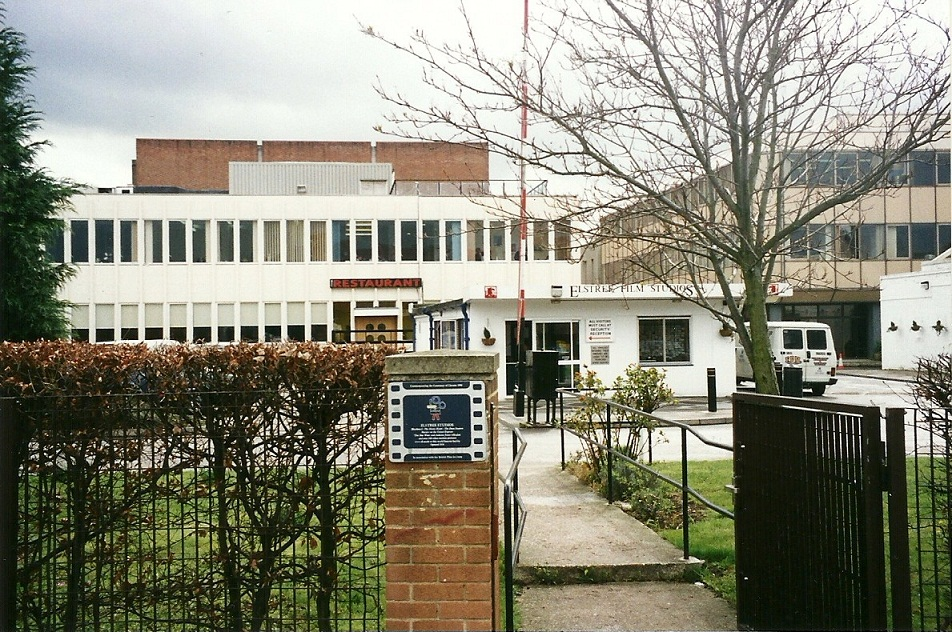
The Main Gate entrance at Shenley Road (late 1990s)

British National Pictures Ltd. purchased 40 acres (16 ha) of land on the south side of Shenley Road and began construction of two large film stages in 1925. The first film produced there was Madame Pompadour (1927). The company was renamed British International Pictures (BIP) and a second stage was ready for production in 1928.

Alfred Hitchcock made Blackmail (1929), the first British talkie at the studios in 1929. At the end of the silent-film era, six new sound stages were built; three of these were sold to the British & Dominions Film Corporation. BIP became Associated British Picture Corporation (ABPC) in 1933. During World War II, the studios were used by the War Office for storage.

In 1946, Warner Brothers acquired a substantial interest in ABPC, appointed a new board and decided to rebuild the stages. In 1969, EMI gained control of ABPC and the studios were renamed EMI-Elstree Studios. In 1969, Bryan Forbes was appointed head of production of the film studio (see EMI Films). His tenure was short-lived and marked by financial problems, brought about by deliberately withheld funding and failed projects. Forbes resigned in 1971. During the period 1970–73, when EMI had a short-lived production and distribution deal with the American Metro-Goldwyn-Mayer film studio, the facilities were known as the EMI-MGM Elstree Studios.

In August 1973, Andrew Mitchell MBE took over from Ian Scott as managing director of the studios but was almost immediately told to close the facility and lay off all the staff. This was halted, but only with significant job cuts and closure of some facilities. The studio's immediate survival was secured through the facilities being used for Star Wars (1977). This led to subsequent Lucas productions such as the Star Wars sequels and Indiana Jones franchise being made at Elstree and also brought in director Steven Spielberg. In 1979, Thorn Electrical Industries merged with EMI after EMI's debacle with its invention of the CT scanner, and the studios were renamed Thorn-EMI Elstree Studios.

Stages at Elstree Studios

The studios were put up for sale in 1985. Acquired by the entertainment and property company Brent Walker part of the largely derelict backlot and their facilities were demolished and 19 acres were sold to Tesco plc to build their superstore.

A "Save Our Studios" campaign mainly led by local writer and historian Paul Welsh MBE, saw the remaining site purchased by Hertsmere Borough Council (for whom Welsh then worked) in February 1996 for two million pounds and they invested ten million pounds for renovations and the construction of two brand new stages, Welsh estimates Hertsmere ratepayers receive a 15% annual return on their original investment. Management company, Elstree Film & Television Studios Ltd were appointed to run the studios in 2000.

The studios at Shenley Road are used for both film and television production and are the permanent home of BBC Studioworks during the redevelopment of Television Centre. Shows such as Strictly Come Dancing and Pointless are recorded there.

=== Station Road Studios, Borehamwood ===
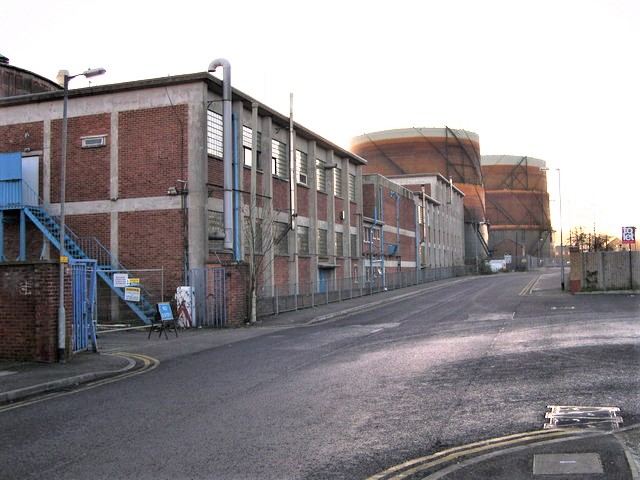
The former Gate Studios in 2004, before demolition in 2006

A single large stage was built in Station Road in 1928 by Whitehall Films Ltd, but the company was wound up in 1930. In 1935, Julius Hagen, the owner of Twickenham Studios, bought the site and formed a new company, JH Studios.

In 1937, financial difficulties forced Hagen to sell the studios to MP Productions owned by producer J Banberger.

During World War II, the studio was used by the government for storage.

In 1950, the site was bought by J. Arthur Rank, who renamed it Gate Studios and made religious films.

Production ceased in 1957, and the site was sold to Andrew Harkness, a manufacturer of cinema screens. Harkness Screens moved out of the site in 2004 having established a global manufacturing base in France and the US and relocated its UK operation to a new production facility in Stevenage. The building in Borehamwood was demolished in 2006 to make way for apartments new properties, the development being named Gate Studios in homage to the former site.

=== Imperial Studios, Borehamwood ===
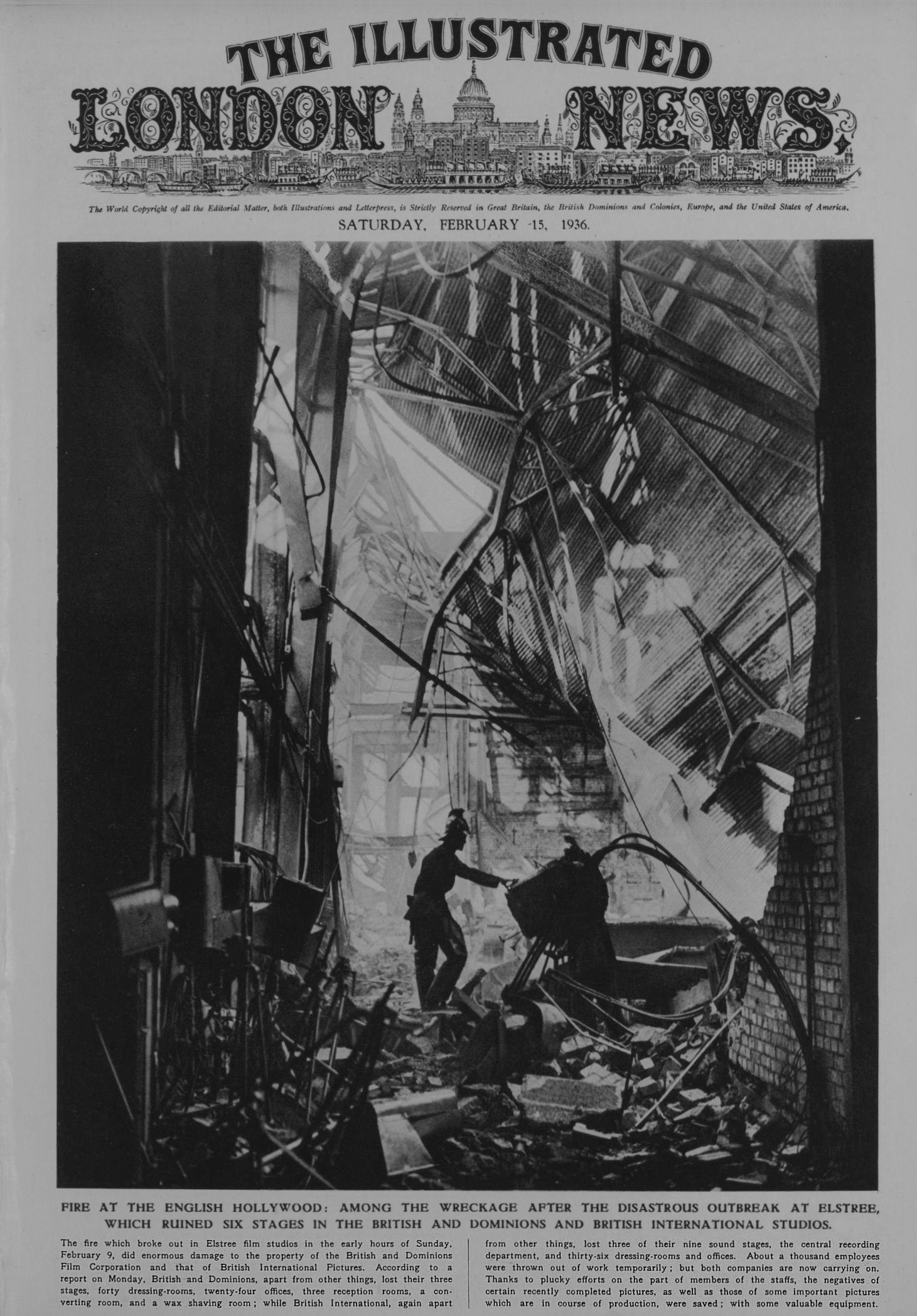
Fire destroys three stages of British and Dominions Studios. The Illustrated London News 15 February 1936

In 1930, the British and Dominions Film Corporation bought three new sound stages from British International Pictures Ltd on the adjoining site before their construction was completed, which they named "Imperial Studios". Alexander Korda made one of his greatest successes at the studio, The Private Life of Henry VIII (1933), which starred Charles Laughton as the King. The film's success in the United States and elsewhere persuaded United Artists and The Prudential to invest in Korda's proposed Denham Film Studios.

Film production continued until 1936 when fire destroyed the three stages. British and Dominions made a substantial investment in Pinewood Studios at Iver Heath, Buckinghamshire, and moved production there. The support buildings in Borehamwood that remained after the fire were sold off to various companies including Frank Landsdown Ltd, which opened a film vault service. The Rank Organisation bought the music stage for the production of documentary films. It later became the headquarters of the film and sound-effect libraries.

=== MGM British, Borehamwood ===
Amalgamated Studios Ltd constructed a large studio on the north side of Elstree Way between 1935 and 1937, but its plans collapsed and the facility was soon sold to Rank, who never used it for making films. After a brief period owned by the Prudential, the studios were purchased by the American film studio Metro-Goldwyn-Mayer (MGM) in 1944 and was renamed MGM-British Studios. After improvements the studio contained seven stages totalling over 70,000 square feet (7,000 m^{2}) of floor space. MGM sometimes leased the studios to other film companies including the 20th Century Fox-produced The Inn of the Sixth Happiness (1958), for which a large set of a Chinese town, complete with artificial lakes, covering some 500,000 square feet, was constructed.

Several stages were taken up with the sets for 2001: A Space Odyssey (1968) over its extended production schedule, and indeed Stanley Kubrick's film is sometimes blamed for making the studios financially unviable. The facility continued to be used until 1970 when MGM closed the studios. The American company formed a short-lived deal with EMI, while the site of its former studios was redeveloped for industrial use and housing.

=== Danziger Studios, Elstree ===
In 1956 the Danziger brothers converted a wartime plane engine testing factory into a film studio they called "New Elstree", which was located to the west of the Aldenham Reservoir. The 7.5-acre (3.0 ha) site had six sound stages and employed 200. It was used mainly for second features and television series, but was closed by 1962 and sold in 1965. The site is now occupied by "The Waterfront" business park on the A411 Elstree Road.

=== Millennium Studios, Elstree Way, Borehamwood ===
Established in 1993, the Millennium Studios on the south side of Elstree Way (opposite the site of the former MGM-British studios) offered television and film production space together with associated services. Productions shot there include the first series of CBBC's The Mysti Show in 2004 and one year of Channel 5's Trisha Goddard in 2005. Millennium Studios relocated to Thurleigh near Bedford in 2010.

A single television studio, Studio 2000, remains on the Borehamwood site, and has been used for the Channel 4 series Rude Tube.

=== Sky Studios Elstree, Borehamwood ===
In December 2019, media conglomerate Sky announced plans to develop a new studio facility at Rowley Lane. The new studios were expected to open in 2022, and to have 13 stages with the smallest being approximately 1,800 m^{2} (19,000 sq ft). The site is also expected to house post-production facilities and an on-site screening cinema. A further 10 stages could be added in a proposal ("Sky Studios Elstree North") to extend the site northward.

There is also a proposal for a separate 21-stage Hertswood Studios immediately to the north of the proposed Sky Studios Elstree North site.

== Timeline ==
The following table lists all the various names of studios over time.

Clarendon Road / Eldon Avenue				
1914–1917; Neptune Film
1917–1928; Ideal Films	Shenley Road			
1917–1928; Ideal Films	1925–1927; British National; Pictures			
1917–1928; Ideal Films	1927–1933; British; International; Pictures	Station Road		
1928–1934; Blattner	1927–1933; British; International; Pictures	1928–1934; Whitehall	Imperial Place	
1928–1934; Blattner	1927–1933; British; International; Pictures	1928–1934; Whitehall	1929–1936; British and Dominions'; Imperial	
1928–1934; Blattner	1933–1969; Associated; British; Picture; Corporation	1928–1934; Whitehall	1929–1936; British and Dominions'; Imperial	
1934–1939; Rock	1933–1969; Associated; British; Picture; Corporation	1934–1935; Consolidated	1929–1936; British and Dominions'; Imperial	Elstree Way (north side)
1934–1939; Rock	1933–1969; Associated; British; Picture; Corporation	1935–1937; J.H.	1929–1936; British and Dominions'; Imperial	1935–1944; Amalgamated
1934–1939; Rock	1933–1969; Associated; British; Picture; Corporation	1937–1950; M.P.		1935–1944; Amalgamated
1939–1953; British National; Films	1933–1969; Associated; British; Picture; Corporation	1937–1950; M.P.		1935–1944; Amalgamated
1939–1953; British National; Films	1933–1969; Associated; British; Picture; Corporation	1937–1950; M.P.		1944–1970; MGM-British
1939–1953; British National; Films	1933–1969; Associated; British; Picture; Corporation	1950–1957; Gate		1944–1970; MGM-British
1953–1958; National (a.k.a. Fairbanks)	1933–1969; Associated; British; Picture; Corporation	1950–1957; Gate		1944–1970; MGM-British
1953–1958; National (a.k.a. Fairbanks)	1933–1969; Associated; British; Picture; Corporation	1950–1957; Gate	Danziger	1944–1970; MGM-British
1953–1958; National (a.k.a. Fairbanks)	1933–1969; Associated; British; Picture; Corporation	1950–1957; Gate	1956–1965; New Elstree	1944–1970; MGM-British
1958–1981; ATV	1933–1969; Associated; British; Picture; Corporation		1956–1965; New Elstree	1944–1970; MGM-British
1958–1981; ATV	1969–1970; EMI			1944–1970; MGM-British
1958–1981; ATV	1970–1973; EMI-MGM			
1958–1981; ATV	1973–1979; EMI			
1958–1981; ATV	1979–1986; Thorn-EMI			
1982–1983; Central TV	1979–1986; Thorn-EMI			
1984–present BBC Elstree; Centre	1979–1986; Thorn-EMI			
1984–present BBC Elstree; Centre	1986–1988; Cannon			
1984–present BBC Elstree; Centre	1988–1996; Goldcrest			Elstree Way (south side)
1984–present BBC Elstree; Centre	1988–1996; Goldcrest			1993–2006; Millennium
1984–present BBC Elstree; Centre	1996–2007; Elstree Film & TV			1993–2006; Millennium
1984–present BBC Elstree; Centre	2007–2008; Elstree Film			1993–2006; Millennium
1984–present BBC Elstree; Centre	2008–present Elstree; Studios			2009–present Studio 2000
1984–present BBC Elstree; Centre	2008–present Elstree; Studios	Rowley Lane		2009–present Studio 2000
1984–present BBC Elstree; Centre	2008–present Elstree; Studios	2023–present Sky Studios; Elstree		2009–present Studio 2000

== See also ==
- List of British film studios
- The Elstree Project, an oral history project capturing stories from crew members who have worked at the studios in Elstree and Borehamwood
- "Elstree" (song)
- Lists of productions shot at each of the Elstree studios:
  - List of films and television shows shot at Elstree Studios
  - List of films and television shows shot at Clarendon Road Studios, Elstree
  - Gate Studios § Films shot at the studios
  - British and Dominions Imperial Studios § Films shot at Imperial Studios
  - List of films shot at MGM-British Studios, Elstree
  - New Elstree Studios § List of films shot at New Elstree Studios

== Sources ==
- Leslie Banks, The Elstree Story: Twenty-One Years of Film-Making. Clarke and Cockeran. 88 pages. With contributions by Douglas Fairbanks, Alfred Hitchcock, Ralph Richardson, Victory Saville, Googie Withers, Anna Neagle and John Mills.
- Castle, Stephen; Brooks, William (1988). The Book of Elstree & Boreham Wood. Buckingham, England: Barracuda Books Ltd. ISBN 978-0-86023-406-7.
- Peecher, John Phillip (1983) The Making of Star Wars: Return of the Jedi. Ballantine Books. ISBN 0-345-31235-X.
- Warren, Patricia (1983). Elstree: The British Hollywood. Columbus Books: London, ISBN 0-86287-446-7.
- Warren, Patricia, (1983). British Film Studios: An Illustrated History. Batsford. ISBN 0-7134-8644-9.
- Welsh, Paul (1996). Elstree Film & Television Festival Programme. Elstree and Borehamwood Town Council.
