= White Cargo (1930 film) =

1930 film

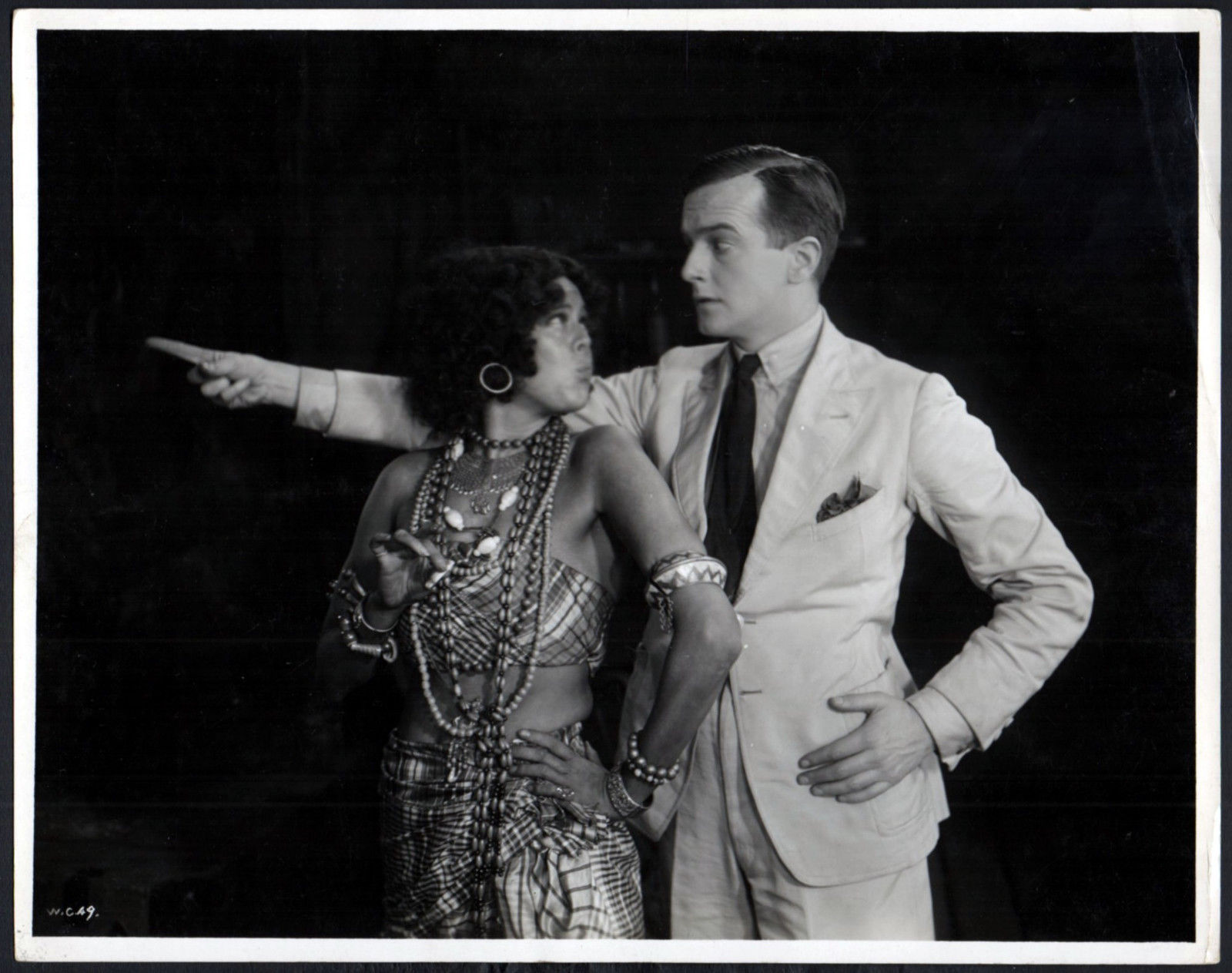
- Directed by: J. B. Williams
- Written by: Leon Gordon (play); Ida Vera Simonton (novel); J. B. Williams
- Produced by: Arthur Barnes; J. B. Williams
- Starring: Leslie Faber; John F. Hamilton; Maurice Evans
- Cinematography: Karl Puth; Freddie Young
- Production company: Neo-Art Productions
- Distributed by: Williams and Pritchard Films
- Release dates: May 1930 (Premiere); October 1930 (General Release)
- Running time: 88 minutes
- Country: United Kingdom
- Languages: Sound (Part-Talkie); English Intertitles

White Cargo is a 1930 sound part-talkie British drama film directed by J.B. Williams and starring Leslie Faber, John F. Hamilton and Maurice Evans. While the film has a few sequences with audible dialog, the majority of the film featured a synchronized musical score with sound effects. The majority of the film was photographed at Twickenham Studios, while the talking sequences were filmed at Whitehall Studios, Elstree which was wired for sound recording.

A Hollywood production, by Metro-Goldwyn-Mayer, White Cargo 1942, stars Hedy Lamarr and Walter Pidgeon.

== Cast ==
- Leslie Faber as Weston
- John F. Hamilton as Ashley
- Maurice Evans as Langford
- Sebastian Smith as Doctor
- Humberston Wright as Missionary
- Henri De Vries as Skipper
- George Turner as Mate
- Tom Helmore as Worthing
- Gypsy Rhoumaje as Tondelayo (as Gypsy Rhouma)

== Music ==
The film features a theme song entitled “White Cargo,” by Alexander Stewart (words) and Manlio Diveroli (music). Also featured on the soundtrack is a song entitled “Tondelayo,” by Stanley Hill (words) and Noel Gay (music).

== Bibliography ==
- Warren, Patricia. British Film Studios: An Illustrated History. Batsford, 2001.
- Wood, Linda. British Films, 1927-1939. British Film Institute, 1986.
