= The Elstree Project =

Oral history project

The Elstree Project logo

The Elstree Project is an oral history project which began in 2010, interviewing cast and crew members who worked at Elstree Studios. The project is conducted by Howard Berry, a Principal Lecturer at the University of Hertfordshire, and formerly involved Elstree Screen Heritage as a partner. The project is endorsed by the BECTU History Project and Elstree Film Studios.

== Background ==
The Elstree Project interviews cast and crew members who have worked at any of the six main studios in Elstree and Borehamwood: Elstree Film Studios (formerly ABPC, later EMI), BBC Elstree Centre (formerly ATV), MGM-British Studios, Danziger's New Elstree Studios, British and Dominion Studios and The Gate Studios.

The project has interviewed crew members from various departments including continuity, sound, post-production, camera and lighting, props and scenery and construction. Writers, producers and directors have also been interviewed, including Jan Harlan, Roger Moore, Brian Blessed, Kenneth Cope, Walter Murch, and Steven Spielberg.

== Access ==
There is currently no method of public access to the complete archive of interviews. However, the project content has been gradually made available through excerpts and edited documentaries. Content is also accessible in the Elstree and Borehamwood museum.

The project has hosted three seasons of screenings, showing either three films or two films and a double-bill of television episodes of productions made at the studios in Elstree and Borehamwood. These have included The Shining (1980), The Prisoner (TV 1967-68), Flash Gordon (1980) and Randall and Hopkirk (Deceased) (TV 1969-70). Edited extracts from the interviews recorded have been made into documentaries which have been premiered before each screening.

The 17-minute-long documentary which preceded The Shining, entitled Staircases to Nowhere: Making Stanley Kubrick's 'The Shining', gained attention from film blogs. Originally containing interviews with five crew members from the film, it was expanded to fifty-five minutes with additional interviews with four more crew members and with Kubrick's widow Christiane. Project content has been used by researchers and authors, such as Kiri Waldon's book British Film Studios, as well as specially created for publication in published works such as the DVD release of Elstree Story.

A documentary, made from project interviews, was completed in October 2014. From Borehamwood to Hollywood: The Rise and Fall and Rise of Elstree, is a 100-minute-long film which tells the story of 100 years of filmmaking in the two towns. The film is narrated by Barbara Windsor.

== Events ==
The project has run several screenings local to the area, and also notably gathered together the crew of The Shining to celebrate the 35th anniversary of the release of the film, in partnership with Warner Brothers. The organisers reunited 25 crew members from the film, along with Pixar director Lee Unkrich, a fan of the film, and brought them back to Elstree Studios for the first time, before screening the film to an audience, with Q&A. Danny Lloyd, who played Danny in the film, also provided a pre-recorded message for the audience, describing his enjoyment of making the film.

== Notable interviewees ==
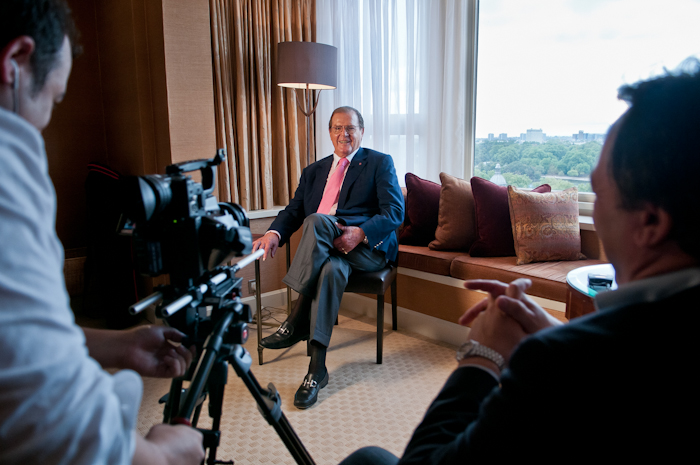
Sir Roger Moore being interviewed for The Elstree Project, September 2012

Interviewed for ‘The Elstree Project’:

- Terry Rawlings (post-production)
- Johnny Goodman (producer)
- John Hough (film director)
- Brian Clemens (writer and producer)
- Roger Moore (actor)
- Douglas Milsome (camera assistant and operator)
- Brian W. Cook (assistant director)
- Brian Blessed (actor)
- Kenneth Cope (actor)
- Steven Spielberg (producer and director)
- Joe Turkel (actor)
- Walter Murch (film and sound editor)
- Barbara Windsor (actress)
- Dave Prowse (actor)
- Trevor Horn (record producer)
- Bradley Walsh (actor and presenter)
- Dave Goelz (muppet performer)

Interviewed for ‘Kubrick Visions’:

- Christiane Kubrick (Stanley Kubrick's widow)
- Jan Harlan (producer)
- Tony Palmer (producer)
- Sir Ken Adam (production designer)
