= A Single Life =

A Single Life may refer to:

- Single Life (film), a 1921 British silent film
- A Single Life (1985 film), an Australian television film
- A Single Life (2014 film), a Dutch short animated film
- Single Life, a 1985 album by Cameo, or the title song
