= Duncan McRae (actor) =

British actor and director (1873–1931)

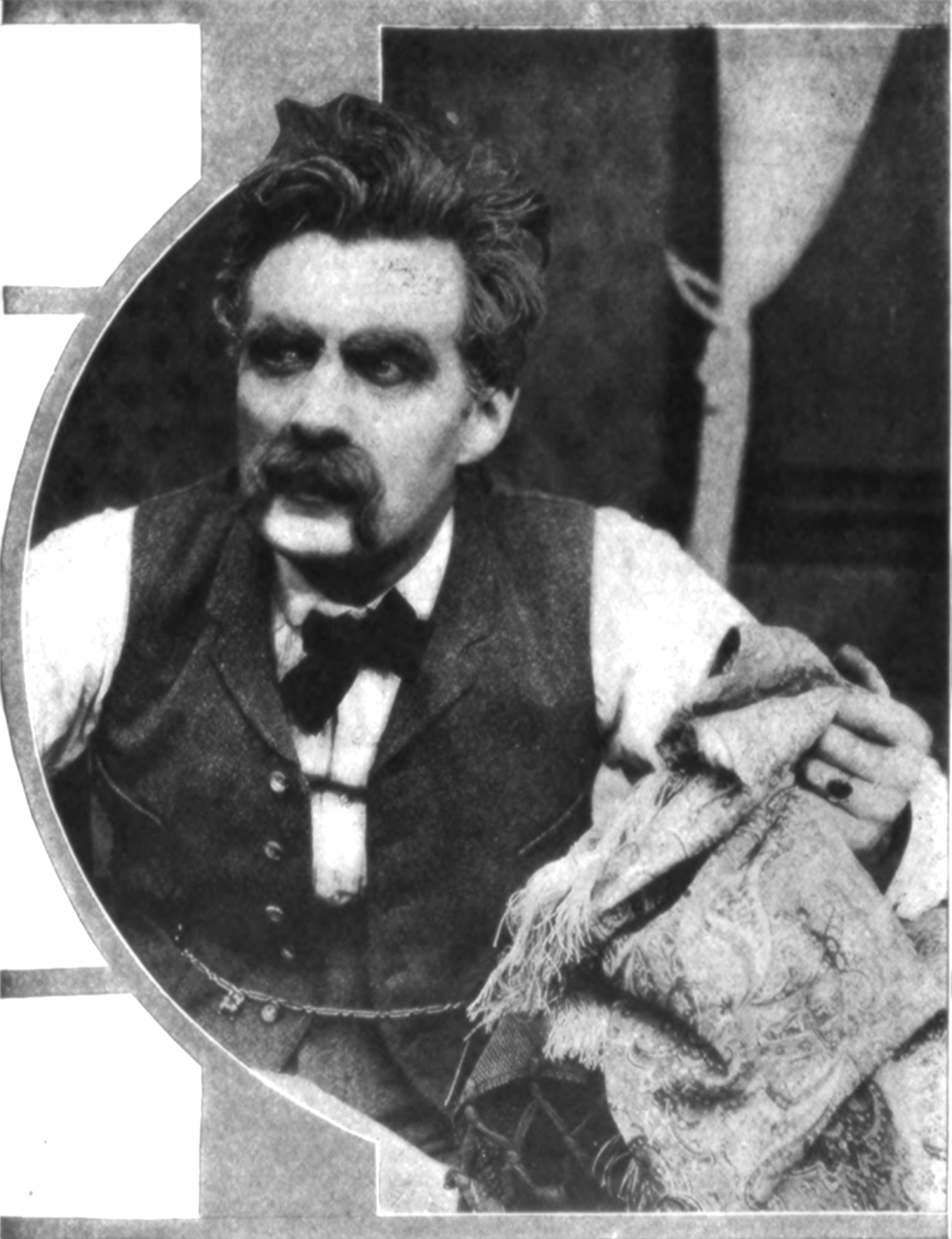
Duncan McRae in Through Turbulent Waters (1915)

Duncan McRae (1873–1931) was a British actor and film director. Much of his acting work was done in the United States.

== Selected filmography ==
Actor

- The House of the Lost Court (1915)
- Cohen's Luck (1915)
- The Woman's Law (1916)
- That Sort (1916)
- The Flower of No Man's Land (1916)
- Red, White and Blue Blood (1917)
- My Own United States (1918)

Director

- June Friday (1915)
- Through Turbulent Waters (1915)
- The Usurper (1919)
- The Auction Mart (1920)
- Money (1921)
