= Desert Mice =

1959 British film by Michael Relph

- Theatrical release quad poster
- Directed by: Michael Relph
- Screenplay by: David Climie
- Produced by: Basil Dearden
- Starring: Alfred Marks; Sid James; Dora Bryan
- Cinematography: Ken Hodges
- Edited by: Reginald Beck
- Music by: Philip Green
- Production companies: Artna Films; Welbeck
- Distributed by: J. Arthur Rank Film Distributors (UK
- Release date: December 1959 (UK)
- Running time: 85 minutes
- Country: United Kingdom
- Language: English

Desert Mice is a 1959 British comedy film directed by Michael Relph and starring Alfred Marks, Sid James, Dora Bryan, Irene Handl, John Le Mesurier and Liz Fraser. The screenplay was by David Climie. A group of ENSA entertainers with the British army in the North Africa desert during the Second World War thwart a Nazi plan. The title is a play on the Desert Rats.

It was a Welbeck Presentation released through Rank.

== Plot ==
An ENSA group tours around North Africa entertaining British troops. One night, Bert hears the tune (with no words) for "Lily Marlene". He sets about writing a variety of lyrics to the tune. Attached to an intelligence unit they realise that when singing their words to the well-known tune some in the audience are singing in German, exposing them as spies.

== Cast ==
- Alfred Marks as Major Poskett
- Sid James as Bert Bennett
- Dora Bryan as Gay Bennett
- Dick Bentley as Gavin O'Toole
- Joan Benham as Una O'Toole
- Reginald Beckwith as Fred
- Irene Handl as Miss Patch
- Kenneth Fortescue as Peter
- Patricia Bredin as Susan
- Liz Fraser as Edie
- Marius Goring as German Major
- Anthony Bushell as Plunkett
- George Rose as Popados
- Alan Tilvern as German Captain
- John Le Mesurier as Staff Colonel
- M. E. Clifton James as Field Marshal Montgomery

== Production ==
The film was made through Sydney Box Associates, who had a deal with the Rank Organisation. The movie was produced through Welbeck Film Distributors, one of Box's companies. Among the other films it made for Rank at this time were The Night We Dropped a Clanger, Too Young to Love, Faces in the Dark and Conscience Bay.

The original title was Every Night Something Awful, which was a joke alternative meaning for ENSA. Filming took place in September 1959. The title was changed to Desert Mice in October 1959.

In one of the lorries a photo of football player Dave Mackay is visible. While the film is set during the Second World War, Mackay did not start his professional football career until 1952.

== Critical reception ==
Sight and Sound said "good idea and a talented cast thrown away on a lazy and boorish script."

Kinematograph called it a "giddy World War II burlesque, given French and North African backdrops... The sallies, mostly at ENSA, are aimed at sitting targets, but a versatile and povular cast and a resourceful director see that the fusillade, punctuated by songs, explodes in laughs. Colourful and realistic settings, worthy of actual war epics, not only furnish sharp contrast, but also amplify its down-to-earth fooling."

Variety wrote "it would be foolish to pretend that “Desert Mice” is anything but a small comedy. Yet, somehow, it has an endearing quality."

Filmink wrote the film "has a great idea... but no feel for its subject (Relph directed) and shoves all its plot into the last 20 minutes."

TV Guide called it a "Light little comedy."

Sky Cinema said: "A good-hearted, sporadically enjoyable tribute to ENSA," whilst noting "an enjoyable roster of familiar British character actors, headed by Sidney James, Dora Bryan, Reginald Beckwith, Irene Handl and Dick Bentley, all seen at near their best. Director Michael Relph's serious-minded talents are not entirely suited to this featherweight farce, although he does deliver some agreeably funny moments."

The Radio Times Guide to Films gave the film 3/5 stars, writing: "The feeble title pun on "Desert Rats" ...rather sets the tone for this overlookable comedy from director Michael Relph. Full of predictable characters, humdrum incidents and gags that would have lowered the morale of even the most battle-hardened tommy, it accompanies an ENSA concert party on its tour of army camps."
