= Pop Pirates =

1984 film

- Video release cover
- Directed by: Jack Grossman
- Written by: Jack Grossman
- Produced by: Ralph Thomas
- Starring: George Sweeney; Roger Daltrey
- Production companies: Welbeck Films; Children's Film and Television Foundation
- Release date: 1984
- Running time: 58 mins
- Country: England
- Language: English
- Budget: £181,208

Pop Pirates is a 1984 British children's adventure film directed and written by Jack Grossman and starring Roger Daltrey and George Sweeney. It was produced by Welbeck Fims for the Children's Film Foundation.

== Plot ==
"The Pirates" are a schoolboy pop group who enter a local talent contest. When it comes to a crucial round in the contest, lead singer Paul is unable to attend, because of his involvement in his uncle Stewart's videotape piracy racket. Paul is thrown out of the group, and their road manager alerts the police to Stewart's nefarious activities.

== Cast ==
- George Sweeney as Stewart
- Roger Daltrey as producer-compère
- Joe Melia as security guard
- Frieda Shand as Mrs Wine
- Allan Love as Steve
- Robert Morgan as Andy
- Christopher Beeny as Mr Crawford
- P. P. Arnold as producer's assistant
- Jon Finch as coastguard officer
- Eamonn Jones as commissionaire
- Simon Rouse as Sergeant Jones
- Bill Treacher as Mr Carpenter
- James Curran as policeman
- Jean Marlow as Mrs Carpenter
- Lisa Turner as Jill
- Stephen Bird as Robert
- Spencer Chandler as Paul
- Patrick Pereira as Tanby
- Calvin Samuel as Fred
- Ricky Simmonds as Michael

== Reception ==
Ann Billson wrote in The Monthly Film Bulletin: "This topical adventure manages to denounce the evils of video piracy while hinging its plot on the bacon-saving capacities of the personal stereo system. But Pop Pirates is rather weakened in that three-quarters of its racially mixed quartet of schoolboy heroes act as virtual stooges, apparently unaware of the drama raging elsewhere in the film. Law and order is restored, not through any effort of the boys themselves, but through the deus ex machina intervention of the police. The contrast between the well-adjusted Michael (seen taking leave of his scatty but happy family) and Paul, the fledgeling law-breaker from a one-parent household, is also a little facile. But George Sweeney's lip-curling performance lends Uncle Stewart an entertainingly seedy dimension."

== Home media ==
The film in included on the DVD Children’s Film Foundation Bumper Box Vol 1 (BFI, 1984).
