= Corinthian Jack =

1921 British film by Walter Courtney Rowden

Corinthian Jack is a 1921 British adventure film directed by Walter Courtney Rowden and starring Victor McLaglen, Kathleen Vaughan and Warwick Ward. It was based on a novel by Charles E. Pearce.

== Cast ==
- Victor McLaglen as Jack Halstead
- Kathleen Vaughan as Nyra Seaton
- Warwick Ward as Sir Philip Tenbury
- Dorothy Fane as Lady Barbara
- Malcolm Tod as Lord Walsham
- Conway Dixon as Col Dane
- William Lenders as Weare
- Roy Raymond as Mike
