= Sydney Paxton =

English actor (1860–1930)

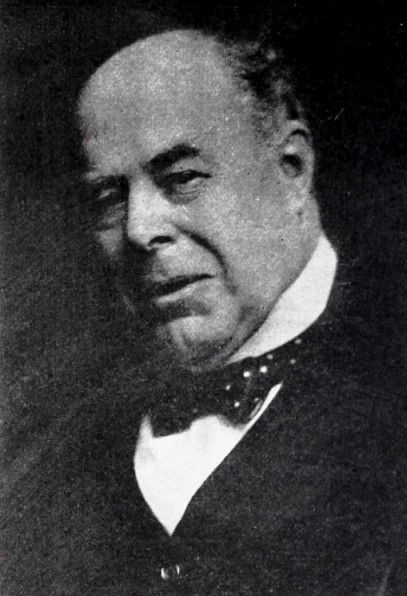
Paxton in 1925

Sydney Paxton (25 June 1860 in London, England, UK – 13 October 1930 in Montauk, New York, USA) was an English stage and film actor.

== Partial filmography ==
- A Man's Shadow (1920)
- The Bachelor's Club (1921)
- The Rotters (1921)
- Single Life (1921)
- The Old Country (1921)
- The Prince and the Beggarmaid (1921)
- Money (1921)
- The Card (1922)
- The Crimson Circle (1922)
- The Hypocrites (1923)
- Becket (1923)
- Little Miss Nobody (1923)
- The School for Scandal (1923)
- The Audacious Mr. Squire (1923)
- The Fair Maid of Perth (1923)
- Miriam Rozella (1924)
- The Midnight Girl (1925)
- Old Home Week (1925)
