= Walter Howard =

English playwright and actor

Walter Howard (7 March 1866, Leamington Spa, Warwickshire, England – 6 October 1922, London) was an English playwright and actor. Several of his plays had there premieres at the Grand Junction Theatre in Hulme, Manchester; including The Midnight Wedding (October 30, 1905) and Second to None (April 1, 1907). The Midnight Wedding was performed in the West End at the Lyceum Theatre, London in 1907, and was the basis for a 1912 silent film of the same name. His play The Prince and the Beggar Maid was also staged at the Lyceum Theatre in 1908, and was revived there in 1910. It was the basis for the 1921 silent film The Prince and the Beggarmaid.

Howard's drama The Story of the Rosary premiered at the Princes Theatre on 20 December 1913, where it ran until 6 June 1914. Howard penned a revised version of Rupert Hughes's The Silver Crucifix which was staged at the Prince of Wales Theatre in 1916 with Howard also starring in the production in the role of Rene Lescarre. His play Seven Days' Leave premiered at the Lyceum Theatre in 1917. It was a long-running hit play at the theatre during World War I.

== Bibliography ==
- Wearing, J. P. (2013a). The London Stage 1900-1909: A Calendar of Productions, Performers, and Personnel. Scarecrow Press. ISBN 9780810892941.
- Wearing, J. P. (2013b). The London Stage 1910-1919: A Calendar of Productions, Performers, and Personnel. Scarecrow Press. ISBN 9780810893009.
