= List of films shot at MGM-British Studios, Elstree =

This is a list of films that were shot at the MGM-British Studios, Borehamwood, England, one of several sites collectively known as "Elstree Studios". The studios were built in 1935, but were not used for filming until they were bought by Metro-Goldwyn-Mayer (MGM) in 1944. The studios were used for MGM productions, but were also rented to many other production companies. The studios closed in 1970 and were demolished soon after.

The list includes feature films for which some or all scenes were shot at the MGM-British studios. It also includes television series for which some or all scenes (of some or all episodes) were shot on film at the studios.

== 1947–1959 ==
- While I Live (Edward Dryhurst Productions; 1947)
- The Guinea Pig (Boulting Brothers/Pilgrim Pictures; 1948)
- Edward, My Son (MGM-British; 1949)
- Maytime in Mayfair (Imperadio Pictures; 1949)
- The Miniver Story (MGM; 1950)
- Ivanhoe (MGM; 1952)
- Mogambo (MGM; 1953)
- Knights of the Round Table (MGM; 1953)
- Diplomatic Passport (Rich and Rich/Princess Pictures; 1954)
- Stranger from Venus (Rich and Rich/Princess Pictures; 1954)
- A Prize of Gold (Warwick Film Productions; 1955)
- Gentlemen Marry Brunettes (Russ-Field Productions; 1955)
- Bhowani Junction (MGM; 1956)
- Stars in Your Eyes (Grand Alliance Film Corporation; 1956)
- Odongo (Warwick Films; 1956)
- The Gamma People (Warwick Films; 1956)
- Lucky Jim (Charter Film Productions; 1957)
- Zarak (Warwick Film Productions; 1957)
- The Man in the Sky (Ealing Films; 1957)
- Fire Down Below (Warwick Film Productions; 1957)
- The Shiralee (Ealing Films; 1957)
- Barnacle Bill (Ealing Films; 1957)
- Dick and the Duchess (Sheldon Reynolds; 1957; TV series shot on film)
- The 7th Voyage of Sinbad (Morningside Productions; 1958)
- "Bank Robbery" (episode of TV series) (Sheldon Reynolds; 1958)
- Tom Thumb (Galaxy Pictures; 1958)
- Dunkirk (Ealing Films; 1958)
- The Doctor's Dilemma (Comet Film Productions; 1958)
- Nowhere to Go (Ealing Films; 1958)
- The Inn of the Sixth Happiness (Buddy Adler; 1958)
- Serious Charge (Alva Films; 1959)
- The House of the Seven Hawks (Coronado Productions; 1959)
- "The Night Apart" (episode of CBS TV series Playhouse 90) (Nicole Milinair Productions; 1959)
- The Rough and the Smooth (George Minter Productions; 1959)
- The Wreck of the Mary Deare (Julian Blaustein Productions/Baroda Productions; 1959)
- Solomon and Sheba (Theme Pictures; 1959)
- The Angry Hills (Raymond Productions; 1959)
- A Touch of Larceny (Foxwell Film Company; 1959)
- Libel (Comet Productions; 1959)

== 1960–1964 ==
- The Day They Robbed the Bank of England (Summit Film Productions; 1960)
- The Millionairess (Dimitri de Grunwald/Twentieth Century-Fox; 1960)
- Danger Man (first series) (Incorporated Television Company for ATV/ITV; 1960–1962; TV series shot on film)
- Jazz Boat (Warwick Film Productions; 1960)
- Let's Get Married (Viceroy Films Limited; 1960)
- The Angel Wore Red (Titanus-Spectator; 1960)
- Too Hot to Handle (Wigmore Productions/ABPC; 1960)
- The World of Suzie Wong (World Enterprises/Worldfilm; 1960)
- Village of the Damned (MGM; 1960)
- Five Golden Hours (Anglofilm/Fabio Jegher; 1961)
- Murder, She Said (MGM; 1961)
- A Matter of WHO (Foray Films; 1961)
- The Green Helmet (MGM; 1961)
- Gorgo (King Brothers Productions; 1961)
- Invasion Quartet (MGM-British; 1961)
- The Secret Partner (MGM-British; 1961)
- Mr. Topaze (Dimitri de Grunwald; 1961)
- She'll Have to Go (Asher Brothers Productions; 1962)
- Postman's Knock (MGM-British; 1962)
- Village of Daughters (MGM-British; 1961)
- Light in the Piazza (Arthur Freed Productions; 1962)
- Dead Man's Evidence (Bayford Films; 1962)
- I Thank a Fool (Eaton Productions; 1962)
- Corridors of Blood (Producers Associates/Amalgamated Productions; 1962)
- Private Potter (MGM; 1962)
- Satan Never Sleeps (Twentieth Century-Fox Film Corporation; 1962)
- The Inspector (Red Lion Productions; 1962)
- Tomorrow at Ten (Mancunian Film Corporation; 1962)
- Nine Hours to Rama (Red Lion Productions; 1963)
- Murder at the Gallop (MGM-British; 1963)
- Echo of Diana (Butcher's Film Service; 1963)
- The Marked One (Planet Film Productions; 1963)
- Maniac (Hammer Film Productions; 1963)
- Master Spy (Eternal Films; 1963)
- Impact (Butcher's Film Production; 1963)
- Clash by Night (Eternal Films/Grand National Pictures; 1963)
- Children of the Damned (MGM-British; 1964)
- It's All Over Town (Delmore Film Productions; 1964)
- 633 Squadron (Mirisch Films; 1964)
- The Chalk Garden (Quota Rentals; 1964)
- The Americanization of Emily (Filmways; 1964)
- Murder Most Foul (MGM-British; 1964)

== 1965–1970 ==
- Murder Ahoy! (MGM-British; 1964)
- A Shot in the Dark (Mirisch Films; 1964)
- The Secret of My Success (MGM-British; 1965)
- Operation Crossbow (Carlo Ponti Cinematografica/MGM-British; 1965)
- The Truth About Spring (Quota Rentals; 1965)
- The Alphabet Murders (MGM-British; 1965)
- Hysteria (Hammer Film Productions; 1965)
- Young Cassidy (Sextant Films; 1965)
- The Hill (Seven Arts Productions; 1965)
- The Yellow Rolls-Royce (MGM; 1965)
- The Liquidator (MGM-British; 1965)
- Where the Spies Are (MGM-British; 1966)
- Eye of the Devil (Filmways; 1966)
- Cuckoo Patrol (Eternal Films/Grand National Pictures; 1967)
- Blowup (Bridge Films/Carlo Ponti Productions; 1967)
- The Dirty Dozen (Kenneth Hyman Production; 1967)
- Battle Beneath the Earth (Reynolds Vetter Productions; 1967)
- Stranger in the House (Selmur Productions/De Grunwald Productions; 1967)
- Dance of the Vampires (Cadre Films/Filmways; 1967)
- The Prisoner (Everyman Films/ITC Entertainment for ATV/ITV; 1967–1968; all episodes of TV series shot on film)
- Attack on the Iron Coast (Oakmont Productions/Mirisch Films; 1967)
- Hammerhead (Irving Allen; 1968)
- The Shoes of the Fisherman (George Englund Enterprises; 1968)
- The Mercenaries (George Englund Enterprises; 1968)
- Journey to the Unknown (Hammer Film Productions for ABC; 1968–1969; TV series shot on film)
- The Fixer (John Frankenheimer Productions/Edward Lewis Productions; 1968)
- 2001: A Space Odyssey (MGM; 1968)
- Where Eagles Dare (Winkast Film Productions; 1968)
- Goodbye, Mr. Chips (Apjac Productions; 1969)
- Alfred the Great (Bernard Smith Productions; 1969)
- The Bushbaby (Velvet Film; 1969)
- Captain Nemo and the Underwater City (Omnia Films; 1969)
- Man's Fate (Timothy Films; shot 1969 but never released)
- Mosquito Squadron (Oakmont Productions; 1969)
- UFO (Century 21 Productions/ITC for ATV/ITV; 1970; 17 episodes of TV series shot on film)
- Julius Caesar (Commonwealth United Entertainment; 1970)
- The Walking Stick (Winkast Film Productions; 1970)

== See also ==
- Lists of productions shot at the other Elstree studios:
  - List of films and television shows shot at Elstree Studios (Shenley Road)
  - List of films and television shows shot at Clarendon Road Studios
  - Gate Studios § Films shot at the studios
  - British and Dominions Imperial Studios § Films shot at Imperial Studios
  - New Elstree Studios § List of films shot at New Elstree Studios
