= White Cargo =

1942 American drama film by Richard Thorpe

- 1942 US theatrical poster
- Directed by: Richard Thorpe
- Screenplay by: Leon Gordon
- Based on: White Cargo; 1923 play by Leon Gordon; Hell's Playground; 1912 novel by Ida Vera Simonton
- Produced by: Victor Saville
- Starring: Hedy Lamarr; Walter Pidgeon
- Cinematography: Harry Stradling Sr.
- Edited by: Fredrick Y. Smith
- Music by: Bronislau Kaper
- Production company: Metro-Goldwyn-Mayer
- Distributed by: Loew's Inc.
- Release date: December 12, 1942
- Running time: 88 minutes
- Country: United States
- Language: English
- Budget: $570,000
- Box office: $2,663,000

1942 type "B" theatrical poster

White Cargo is a 1942 American drama film starring Hedy Lamarr and Walter Pidgeon, and directed by Richard Thorpe. Released by Metro-Goldwyn-Mayer, it is based on the 1923 London and Broadway hit play by Leon Gordon, which was in turn adapted from the 1912 novel Hell's Playground by Ida Vera Simonton. The play had already been made into a British part-talkie, also titled White Cargo, with Maurice Evans in 1930. The 1942 film, unlike the play, begins in what was then the present-day, before unfolding in flashback.

== Plot ==
During the early years of World War II Worthing the “boss”, is on board a seaplane, the Congo Queen on an inspection tour of rubber plantations in remote locations in the West African jungle. The plane lands at a large, modern operation. Worthing tells the local supervisor that they must maximize production because the Japanese hold Malaya, reducing the supply of that critical war material. He points to a photograph on the wall that shows thatched shacks beside a river and remembers the old days, in 1910, before “refrigerators, electricity and air-conditioning gadgets…schools and infirmaries.” The camera zooms into the photo, which comes to life.

Four men, the only whites within hundreds of square miles, eagerly await the arrival of the riverboat Congo Queen. Wilbur Ashley and his boss, Harry Witzel, have succumbed to the monotony of living and working together in isolation and grown to hate one-another. Ashley is finally going home, being replaced by the abominably green Langford, set to commence a four-year stint. The other greeters are the badly alcoholic doctor and ineffectual missionary Reverend Dr. Roberts.

There is nothing Witzel hates more than breaking in a new man. He and Langford get off to a bad start, with Witzel constantly badgering Langford and insisting that he'll never stick, won't work out, and would do them both a favor by just going home. Things only go downhill from there. As it had been with Ashley, it takes all of the efforts of the doctor and Roberts to keep the two men from each other's throats. The situation becomes worse when Tondelayo, a notorious bauble-craving native seductress, returns. Harry, as resident magistrate, has already ordered her to leave his district, declaring her to be a disruptive, immoral influence.

Tondelayo begins to work her wiles on Langford. Despite warnings from all three of the other men (and clearly to spite Witzel), he falls for her charms - as both Ashley and Witzel had before him. And her incessant pestering for silks and bangles and gold jewelry from Lagos. When Witzel's orders her expelled once more, Langford decides to marry her to put her past the slightly deranged but well-intentioned man's incessant rebukes. Roberts reveals that rather than being a native African, she is half Egyptian and half Arab, making marriage unpleasant to the other men's sensibilities but morally acceptable. In spite of his better judgment, and loud and sustained protests from Witzel, Roberts feels compelled by his faith to join the couple in holy matrimony.

After five months, Tondelayo has grown bored of her husband, and he of her. Always stirring up trouble to spice up her life, she tries to seduce Harry; he refused to allow the old flame to be re-lit, reminding her that she is Mrs. Langford "until death do you part". With that she sees a way out of her bonds. When Langford becomes sick, the doctor gives her medicine to administer to him. She obtains poison from a native in trade for a rifle and gives him that instead. Harry, suspecting her deception, hides, then ambushes her just as she is about to give Langford a fatal dose. In his dual roles of local magistrate and self-appointed avenger of wrong, Harry forces her to drink the rest of the poison. She runs away screaming and collapses on the jungle floor.

The doctor takes Langford away on the Congo Queen for better medical treatment, Witzel identifying the man merely as ‘white cargo’. From the boat comes Langford's replacement: a young, maddeningly enthusiastic, and infuriatingly naive Worthing. After trying but failing to hold his temper, Harry seizes him and forcefully tells him that he will stick around. Nothing will stop him from living, breathing, and thinking rubber 24 hours a day.

Returning to the present, Worthing observes that he did stick.

== Cast ==
- Hedy Lamarr as Tondelayo
- Walter Pidgeon as Harry Witzel
- Frank Morgan as The Doctor
- Richard Carlson as Langford
- Reginald Owen as Skipper of the Congo Queen
- Henry O'Neill as Reverend Dr. Roberts
- Bramwell Fletcher as Wilbur Ashley
- Clyde Cook as Ted
- Leigh Whipper as Jim Fish
- Oscar Polk as Umeela
- Darby Jones as Darby
- Richard Ainley as Worthing

== Production ==
In 1930, Gordon sold the film rights to British International Pictures (BIP) for £15,000. The company then decided to make a sound version and paid Gordon an extra £10,000 for talking rights. The British film version followed the play closely. MGM bought the film rights from BIP and hired Gordon to adapt his own play.

=== Production Code problems ===
According to the Production Code Administration section of the file on the film in the Motion Picture Association of America collection at the Margaret Herrick Library of the Academy of Motion Picture Arts and Sciences, the miscegenation element - a white man becoming intimately involved with a native African woman - of Leon Gordon's story caused great censorship difficulties, beginning with the U.S. distribution of a 1929 British screen adaptation of his play, also titled White Cargo. Maurice Evans, and Gypsy Rhouma, generated complaints from industry insiders, who felt that its distribution in the U.S. violated the spirit of Hays' decree.

In the play, Tondelayo is described throughout as a "negress." The March 1930 New York release of the 1929 British film, directed by J. B. Williams and Arthur Barnes, starring Leslie Faber, in the U.S. violated the spirit of Hays' decree.

As noted in articles included in the MPAA/PCA files, in accordance with the MPPDA's 1924 agreement of self-imposed censorship, MPPDA head Will Hays deemed the play unacceptable for screen adaptation under the Motion Picture Production Code, effectively banning any studios from producing it.

Tondelayo's ethnicity was therefore changed for the movie, turned into an exotic Arab. In Gordon's original script this fact was to be revealed at the end, but the censor requested the information be revealed earlier. To comply, it was introduced as part of the marriage controversy, which is far more over Tondelayo's character and behavior than her race.

In April 1942, MGM announced they would make the film as a vehicle for Hedy Lamarr. Leon Gordon adapted his own play and Walter Pidgeon was assigned the lead role (which had been played by Gordon in the original stage production).

Film production ran from May 18 to early June 1942.

== Reception ==
=== Box office ===
According to MGM records, the film was highly successful, grossing $1,654,000 in the US and Canada and $1,009,000 elsewhere, and earning a profit of $1,240,000.

Reviews

The film also received negative critical attention. According to the AFI Catalog, Bosley Crowther of The New York Times named White Cargo one of the ten worst films of 1942.

Princeton University's student newspaper, the Daily Princetonian reviewed White Cargo as a "remake of a corny bonanza of the '20s {that} has no pretentions of art."

The Portsmouth Herald began their review with "She's LaMarrvelous!!" as the heading. They called White Cargo "one of the most sensational performances ever brought to the silver screen is given by Hedy Lamarr."
