= Leon Gordon (playwright) =

English-born playwright, screenwriter, actor and director (1894–1960)

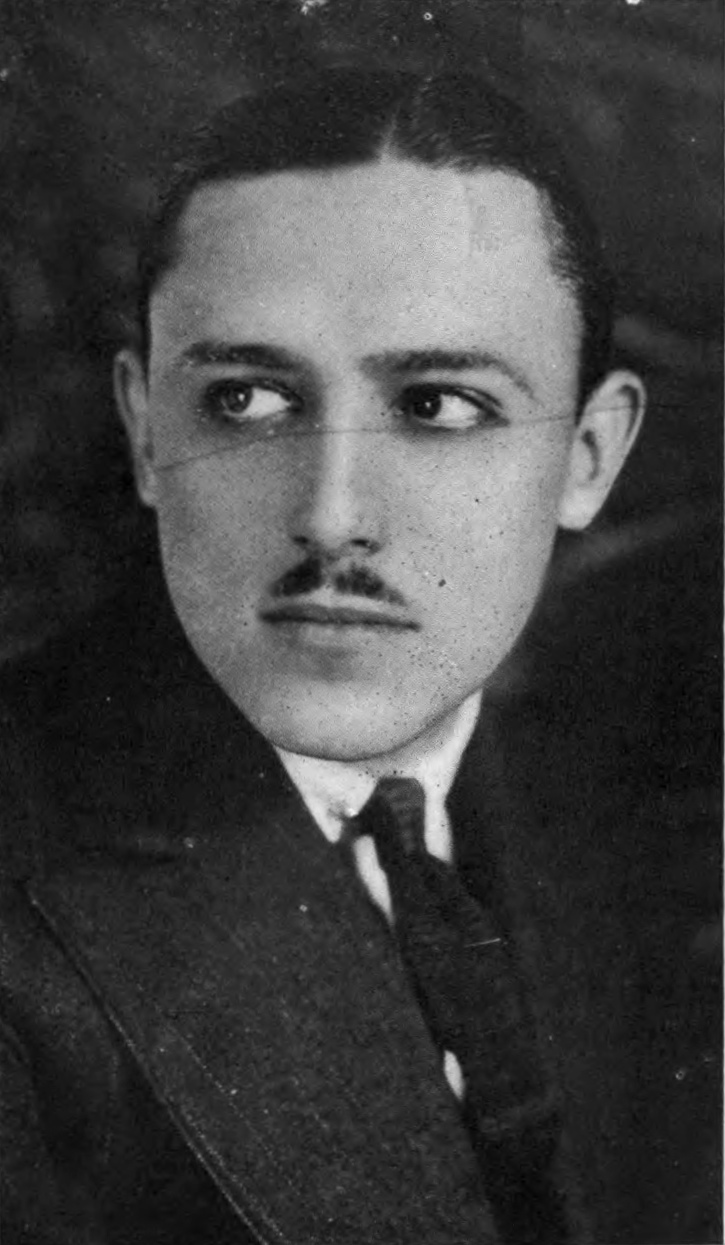
- Gordon in 1918
- Born: Leon Gordon Bennett; 12 January 1894; Brighton, England, U.K.
- Died: 4 January 1960 (aged 65); Los Angeles, California, U.S.
- Occupations: Actor; playwright; dramatist; screenwriter; director; sportman
- Spouses: Georgia Spence; Nancy Evelyn

Leon Gordon Bennett (12 January 1894 – 4 January 1960) was an English-born actor, playwright, screenwriter, director and sportsman who wrote the screenplay for White Cargo.

== Biography ==
Gordon was born in Brighton, England in January 1894 and studied at St. John's College. He became an actor and was a leading man with the Boston Repertory Company. He began writing plays. After directing plays in Australia, he emigrated to the United States. In 1930 he joined MGM.

He died of a heart ailment at the Cedars of Lebanon Hospital, in Los Angeles, California on 4 January 1960. He was survived by two daughters.

== Select film credits ==
- Sandra (1924) (as an actor)
- White Cargo (1930)
- Heartbreak (1931)
- Freaks (1932)
- Age of Indiscretion (1935)
- The Last of Mrs. Cheyney (1937)
- A Yank at Oxford (1938)
- Broadway Melody of 1940 (1940)
- They Met in Bombay (1941)
- White Cargo (1942)
- Kim (1950)
- The Hour of 13 (1952)

== Select plays ==
- Watch Your Neighbour (1923)
- Garden of Weeds (1925)
- The Piker (1926)
