= Kathleen Vaughan =

British actress

Kathleen Vaughan was a British actress.

== Selected filmography ==
- The Old Country (1921)
- Single Life (1921)
- Handy Andy (1921)
- Corinthian Jack (1921)
- The Prince and the Beggarmaid (1921)
- Belphegor the Mountebank (1921)
- The Adventures of Mr. Pickwick (1921)
- The Crimson Circle (1922)
- Hornet's Nest (1923)
- The Last Hour (1930)
