= The House of the Lost Court =

1915 film by Charles Brabin

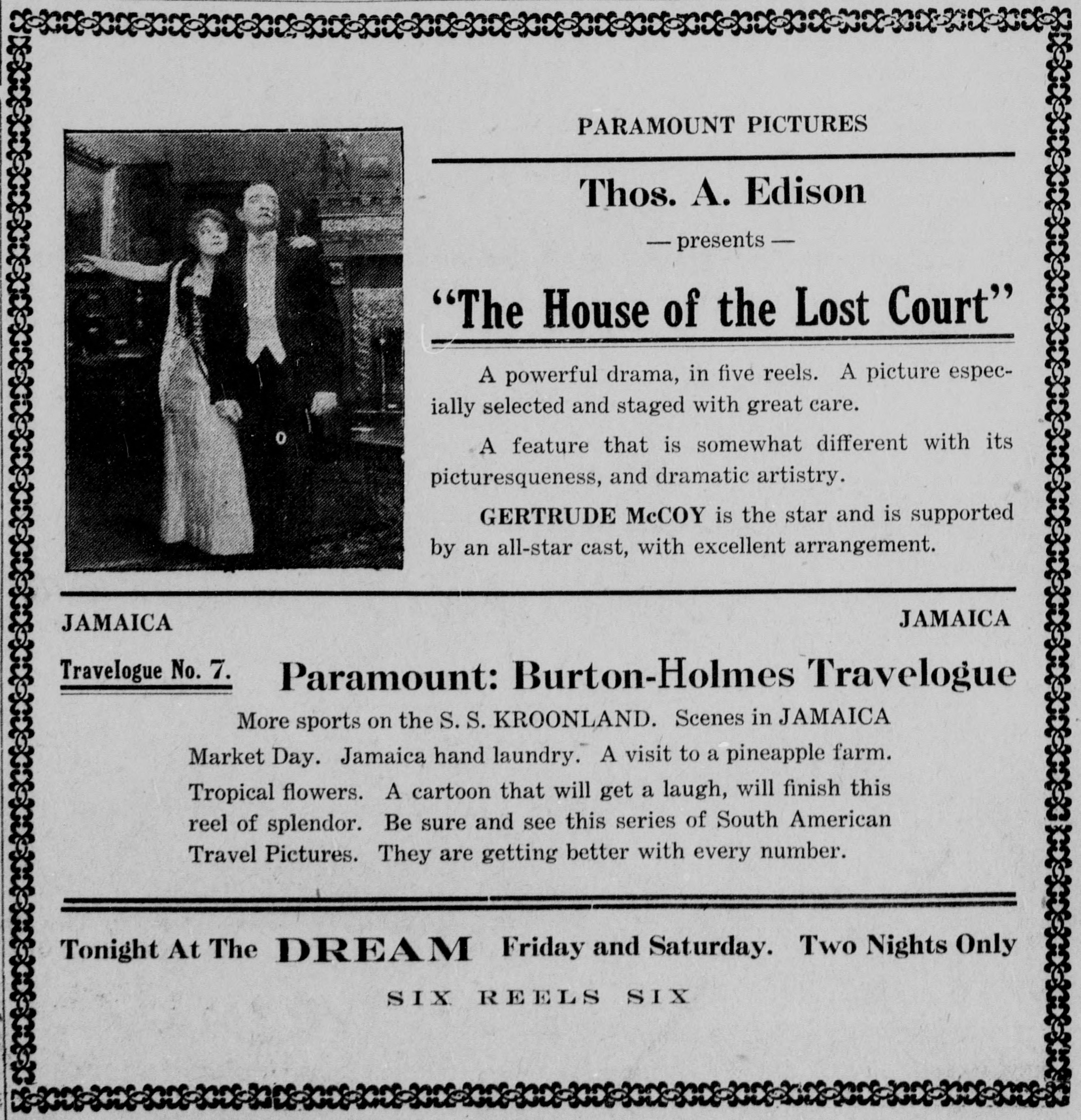
- Contemporary advertisement
- Directed by: Charles Brabin
- Screenplay by: A.M. Williamson (novel)
- Produced by: Thomas Edison
- Starring: Robert Conness; Duncan McRae; Helen Strickland; Sally Crute; Viola Dana; Margery Bonney
- Production company: Edison Company
- Distributed by: Paramount Pictures
- Release date: May 6, 1915
- Country: United States
- Language: English

The House of the Lost Court is a 1915 American drama silent film directed by Charles Brabin and written by A.M. Williamson. The film stars Robert Conness, Duncan McRae, Helen Strickland, Sally Crute, Viola Dana and Margery Bonney. The film was released on May 6, 1915, by Paramount Pictures.

== Plot ==
The House of the Lost Court follows the story of siblings Giles and Clare Randolph, who face the unsettling reality of leaving their family's historic estate, a once-grand mansion known as the "House of the Lost Court." The Randolph family has a long history tied to this estate, which symbolizes their lineage, social standing, and once-prosperous legacy. However, after the family's financial ruin, a distant heir inherits the property, leaving Giles and Clare to navigate a world beyond their sheltered upbringing.

As they adjust to life outside their former home, Giles is determined to restore the Randolph family's name and reclaim what has been lost. Meanwhile, Clare must confront her conflicting feelings: loyalty to her family's traditions versus her desire for independence. Together, the siblings find themselves drawn into a mix of family obligations, social challenges, and personal ambitions that threaten to divide them. Their journey sheds light on themes of loyalty, resilience, and the weight of heritage in the face of inevitable change.

== Cast ==
- Robert Conness as Sir Anthony Elliott
- Duncan McRae as Honorable Captain Paul Elliott
- Helen Strickland as Lady Rosamund
- Sally Crute as Nina Desmond
- Viola Dana as Dolores Edgerton
- Margery Bonney Erskine as Mrs. Edgerton
- Gertrude McCoy as Elinore Vane
- William West as The Butler
