= George Sweeney (actor) =

British actor (born 1943)

George Sweeney (born April 1943) is a British film and television actor who commenced his acting career in the 1970s after graduating from RADA in 1971.

Sweeney has numerous television credits, including Z-Cars (1971), Rumpole of the Bailey (1975), Dixon of Dock Green (1976), Softly, Softly: Task Force (1971–76), The New Avengers (1976), The Sweeney (appeared in the episodes "Taste of Fear" and "On the Run" in 1976), Return of the Saint (1978), Spearhead (1978–79), Citizen Smith as 'Speed' (1977–80), Fair Ground! (1983), Remington Steele (1985), Matlock (1987), Jack the Ripper (1988) as John Netley, Minder (1980–93), Pie in the Sky (1995), The Brittas Empire (1996), Trial & Retribution (1997),The Bill (1992–2006) and Casualty (1994–2007).

His film appearances include The Best Pair of Legs in the Business (1973), The Bitch (1979), For Your Eyes Only (1981), Lion of the Desert (1981), Pop Pirates (1984), Without a Clue (1988), G:MT – Greenwich Mean Time (1999), Revolver (2005), Dom Hemingway (2013) and Top Dog (2014).

Sweeney lived in Welwyn Garden City in Hertfordshire with his wife Lesley, but has relocated to Welwyn Village. He has two sons and five grandchildren.
