= Pauline Hahn =

American actress

- Born: October 10, 1941 (age 84); New York City, U.S.
- Education: New York University; Columbia University
- Occupation: Actress
- Years active: 1950–59

Pauline Hahn (born October 10, 1941) is an American stage and screen actress, professor, and writer. Hahn starred as Dixie in the original Broadway production of Cat on a Hot Tin Roof in 1955. Her notable films included Too Young to Love (1959).

== Early life ==
Hahn was born on the East Side of New York City. Her flair for mimicry became evident when she was two years old, leading to popularity on the Borscht Belt. While still a youngster, she expanded her repertoire of skills by learning ventriloquism and adding it to her act. Her mother was Elizabeth Egerman.

== Theatrical career ==
Hahn received her Actors Equity Card as a child in 1947. Following years on the Catskills summer circuit and radio, Hahn made her professional acting debut portraying one of the children in As the Girls Go for the 1948-50 run at the Winter Garden Theater. She went on to play First Little Girl in the Fulton Theater production of Twilight Walk. She also appeared in Me and Molly (1948) with Gertrude Berg, and Cloud 7 (1958). Hahn's most prominent role was that of Dixie in the original Broadway production of Cat on a Hot Tin Roof (1955) at the Morosco Theater.

Hahn played the title role in the Kermit Bloom Garden Broadway T&B Semi-national tour production of The Diary of Anne Frank (1958). She has had over 500 television appearances including The Ed Sullivan Show and several hundred radio show credits including as a regular appearance on the Horn and Harter Children's Hour, Search for Tomorrow and others.

Hahn also appeared in four Yiddish language productions including Dos Leib iz a Cholem (Life is a Dream) 1945, Vell'n Zei Gedenken? (Will They Remember?) as well as with the National Yiddish Folksbiene Theater (1979).

In 1995, Hahn had the title role in Sacajawea, a multi-media production about the native American woman who helped with the Lewis and Clark Expedition, when it had its world premiere in India.

== Education and feminism ==
In 1963, Hahn began attending Borough of Manhattan Community College. In addition to her formal studies, she began a women's studies group for students and faculty members. That effort was the beginning of Hahn's involvement in feminist activities — an involvement that grew out of Hahn's being the subject of sexist encounters in the theater business, which an article in the New Jersey Jewish News described as a "harrowing world of endless sexism, harassment, and rape by agents, directors, the press ... that eventually soured her on the industry." From that start, she became more active, and in 1969 she was the press spokesperson and floor chair for the First National Congress to Unite Women.

After graduating from New York University with a master's degree, Hahn began to travel the world, teaching at a variety of educational institutions, including Hebrew University of Jerusalem and Vassar College.

== Selected filmography ==
- Abe Burrows' Almanac (1950) as herself
- Too Young to Love (1959) as Elizabeth Collins
