= The Prince and the Beggarmaid =

1921 film

The Prince and the Beggermaid
- Directed by: A. V. Bramble
- Written by: Eliot Stannard
- Based on: The Prince and the Beggar Maid, a play by Walter Howard
- Starring: Henry Ainley; Kathleen Vaughan; Harvey Braban; Sidney Paxton
- Production company: Ideal Film Company
- Distributed by: Ideal Film Company
- Release date: 1921
- Country: United Kingdom
- Language: English

The Prince and the Beggarmaid is a 1921 British silent drama film directed by A. V. Bramble and starring Henry Ainley, Kathleen Vaughan and Harvey Braban. It was based on a play of the same name by Walter Howard.

== Cast ==
- Henry Ainley - Prince Olaf
- Kathleen Vaughan - Princess Monika
- Harvey Braban - King Hildred
- Sam Wilkinson - Prince Michael
- Sidney Paxton - Chief of State
- John Wyndham - Captain Karsburg
- Laurence Forster - General Erlenberg
- Francis Duguid - Captain Schway
- Frank Woolf - Captain Hector
