= Welbeck Films =

British film production company

Welbeck Films was a British film production company associated with the Rank Organisation.

== Select films ==
- To Dorothy, A Son (1954)
- Desert Mice (1959)
- Too Young to Love (1960)
- How to Undress in Public without Undue Embarrassment (1965)
- Doctor in Trouble (1970)
- Percy (1971)
- It's a 2'6" Above the Ground World (1973)
- Percy's Progress (1974)
- Pop Pirates (1984)
