= The Rotters =

1921 film

- Directed by: A. V. Bramble
- Written by: Arthur Q. Walton
- Starring: Joe Nightingale; Sydney Fairbrother; Sidney Paxton; Roger Tréville
- Production company: Ideal Film Company
- Distributed by: Ideal Film Company
- Release date: 1921
- Country: United Kingdom
- Language: English

The Rotters is a 1921 British silent comedy film directed by A. V. Bramble and starring Joe Nightingale, Sydney Fairbrother and Sidney Paxton. The film is based on a play by H. F. Maltby.

== Plot ==
A headmistress recognises a married Justice of Peace as her ex-lover and stops him from sentencing the Mayor's son.

== Cast ==
- Joe Nightingale - Joe Barnes
- Sydney Fairbrother - Jemima Nivet
- Sidney Paxton - John Clugson MP
- Margery Meadows - Estelle Clugson
- Roger Tréville - Percy Clugson
- Ernest English - John Wait
- Cynthia Murtagh - Margaret Barnes
- Clare Greet - Mrs Clugson
- Stanley Holloway - Arthur Wait
- Margaret Shelley - Winnie Clugson
