= The Old Country =

1921 film directed by A. V. Bramble

- Directed by: A. V. Bramble
- Written by: Dion Clayton Calthrop (play); Eliot Stannard
- Starring: Gerald McCarthy; Kathleen Vaughan; Haidee Wright; George Bellamy
- Production company: Ideal Film Company
- Distributed by: Ideal Film Company
- Release date: 1921
- Country: United Kingdom
- Language: English

The Old Country is a 1921 British silent drama film directed by A. V. Bramble and starring Gerald McCarthy, Kathleen Vaughan and Haidee Wright.

It adapts a play by Dion Clayton Calthrop (same year, same title). The play was adapted by Eliot Stannard, being one of various scripts he based on literary works in the late 1910s-early 1920s.

== Premise ==
A Yankee planter buys a squire's house, where he installs his exiled mother, to learn that he is in fact the squire's son.

== Cast ==
- Gerald McCarthy – James Fountain
- Kathleen Vaughan – Mary Lorimer
- Haidee Wright – Mrs. Fountain
- George Bellamy – Squire
- Ethel Newman – Annette Alborough
- Stanley Roberts – Austin Wells
- Sidney Paxton – Steward
