= Money (1921 film) =

1921 film

- Directed by: Duncan McRae
- Written by: Edward Bulwer-Lytton (play); Eliot Stannard
- Starring: Henry Ainley; Faith Bevan; James Lindsay; Olaf Hytten
- Production company: Ideal Film Company
- Distributed by: Ideal Film Company
- Release date: 1921
- Country: United Kingdom
- Language: English

Money is a 1921 British silent comedy film directed by Duncan McRae and starring Henry Ainley, Faith Bevan and Margot Drake. It is an adaptation of the 1840 comic play Money by Edward Bulwer-Lytton. The film had 5 reels.

== Cast ==
- Henry Ainley as Alfred Evelyn
- Faith Bevan as Georgina Vesey
- Margot Drake as Clare Douglas
- Sam Wilkinson as Sir Frederick Blount
- James Lindsay as Captain Smooth
- Olaf Hytten as Henry Graves
- Sidney Paxton as Sir John Vesey
- Ethel Newman as Lady Franklyn
- Adelaide Grace as Nanny

== Reception ==
The film was described as "an instance of the triumph over difficulties and [...] an evidence of the power that a good cast has to lift a production from a low level."
