= Gate Studios =

Part of Elstree Studios

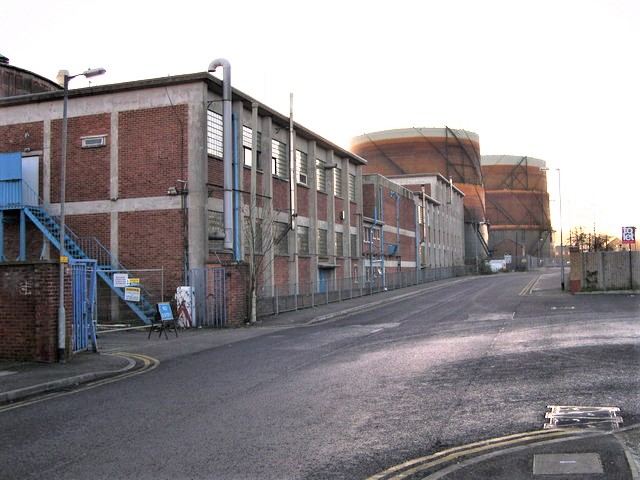
- The former Gate Studios in 2004, before demolition in 2006
- Interactive map of the Gate Studios area
- Former names: Whitehall Studios; Consolidated Studios; J.H. Studios; M.P. Studios
- Alternative names: Station Road Studios

General information
- Type: Film studios
- Location: Station Road, Borehamwood, Hertfordshire, United Kingdom
- Coordinates: 51.6537°N 0.2791°W
- Inaugurated: 1928
- Demolished: 2006
- Owner: Whitehall Films Ltd (1928–1930); Consolidated Films (1934–1935); Julius Hagen (1935–1937); M.P. Productions (1937); J. Arthur Rank (1950-1957); Harkness Screens (1957-2004)

Gate Studios was one of the many studios known collectively as Elstree Studios in the town of Borehamwood, England. Opened in 1928, the studios were in use until the early 1950s. The studios had previously been known as Whitehall Studios, Consolidated Studios, J.H. Studios and M.P. Studios.

== History ==
A single large stage was built in Station Road, Borehamwood, in 1928 by Whitehall Films Ltd, but the company was dissolved in 1930, and its studio sold to Audible Filmcraft, who, in turn, crashed in August 1932. Consolidated Film Studios took over the lease in November 1933, then Independent Producers Studios acquired the studio in July 1935. In November 1935, Julius Hagen, the owner of Twickenham Studios, bought the site and formed a new company, J.H. Studios. Financial problems forced Hagen to sell the studios to M.P. Productions in 1937. The studios were acquired by the Anglo-American Film Corporation in September 1938. During World War II, the studio was used by the government for storage.

In 1950, the site was bought by J. Arthur Rank, who renamed it Gate Studios and made religious films. The last film produced was John Wesley in 1954, and the site was sold to Andrew Harkness, a manufacturer of cinema screens. Harkness Screens moved out of the site in 2004 having established a global manufacturing base in France and the US and relocated its UK operation to a new production facility in Stevenage. The building in Borehamwood was demolished in 2006 to make way for 133 new properties, the development being named Gate Studios in homage to the former site.

== Films shot at the studios ==
=== Whitehall Studios ===
The following films were shot at Whitehall Studios.

- The Inseparables (Whitehall Films; 1927)
- White Cargo (Neo-Art Productions; 1930)
- Things To Come (London Films; 1936)
- The Amazing Quest of Ernest Bliss (Garrett-Klement Pictures; 1936)
- As You Like It; (Inter-Allied Films; 1936)

=== J.H. Studios ===
The following films were shot at J.H. Studios.

- Chick (British and Dominions; 1936)
- Dusty Ermine (Twickenham Studios; 1936)
- The Man in the Mirror (J.H. Productions; 1936)
- Pay Box Adventure (British and Dominions/Paramount; 1936)
- Spy of Napoleon (J.H. Productions; 1936)
- Clothes and the Woman (J.H. Productions; 1937)

=== M.P. Studios ===
The following films were shot at M.P. Studios.

- The Minstrel Boy (Dreadnought Films; 1937)
- A Sister to Assist 'Er (Associated Independent Productions; 1938)
- Old Mother Riley Joins Up (British National Films; 1939)
- Secret Journey (British National Films; 1939)
- Trunk Crime (Charter Film Productions; 1939)
- Crimes at the Dark House (Pennant Picture Productions; 1940)

=== Gate Studios ===
The following films were shot at Gate Studios.

- Under the Frozen Falls (Gaumont-British Instructional; 1948)
- The Lost People (Gainsborough Pictures; 1949)
- Odette (Wilcox-Neagle Productions; 1950)
- Once a Sinner (John Argyle Productions; 1950)
- Lilli Marlene (William Gell Productions; 1950)
- The Happy Family (London Independent Producers; 1952)
- The Promise (G.H.W. Productions; 1952)
- Women of Twilight (Romulus Films; 1953)
- Decameron Nights (Amerit Film Corporation; 1953)
- Street Corner (London Independent Producers; 1953)
- Innocents in Paris (Romulus Films; 1953)
- Harmony Lane (Harry Reynolds Productions; 1954)
- John Wesley (G.H.W. Productions/Radio & Film Commission of the Methodist Church; 1954)

== See also ==
- Category:Films shot at Station Road Studios, Elstree
- Lists of productions shot at the other Elstree studios:
  - List of films and television shows shot at Elstree Studios
  - List of films and television shows shot at Clarendon Road Studios
  - British and Dominions Imperial Studios § Films shot at Imperial Studios
  - List of films shot at MGM-British Studios, Elstree
  - New Elstree Studios § List of films shot at New Elstree Studios
