= Ida Vera Simonton =

American writer

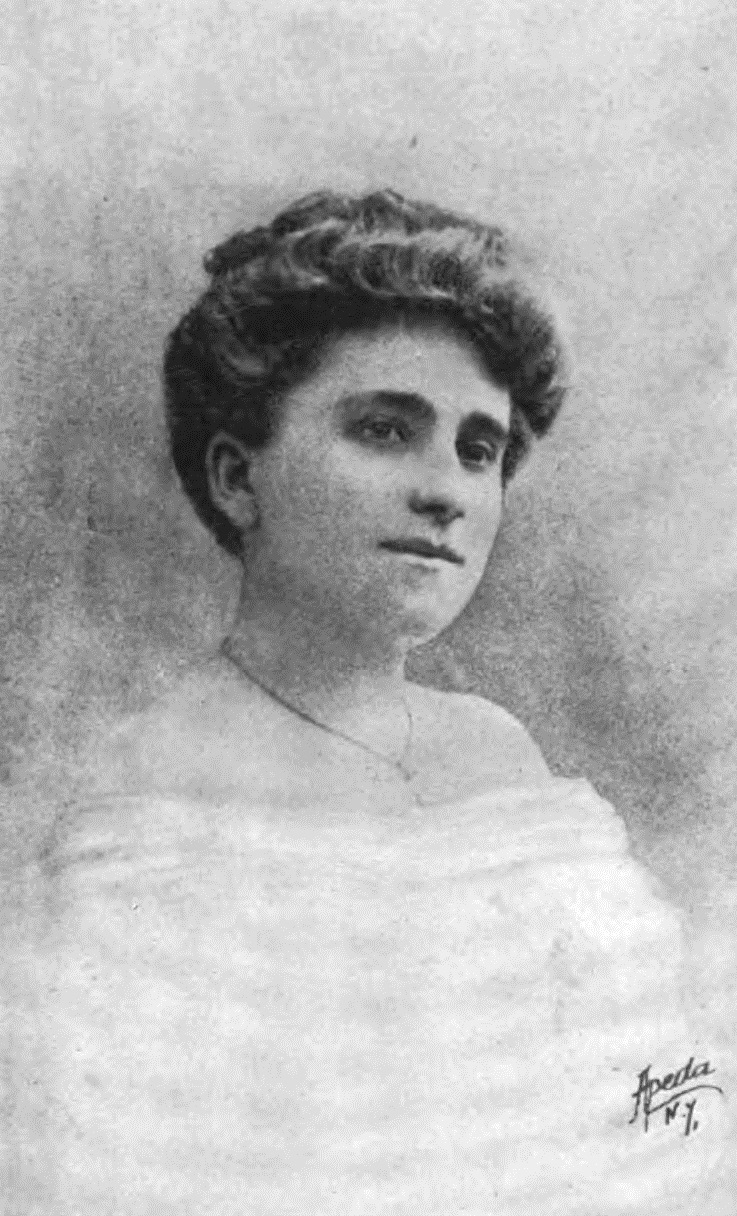
- Ida Vera Simonton, from a 1913 publication
- Born: September 13, 1870; Pittsburgh, Pennsylvania, USA
- Died: July 5, 1931 (aged 60); New York City
- Occupations: Writer; traveler; lecturer

Ida Vera Simonton (September 13, 1870 – July 5, 1931) was an American writer and lecturer. She spent two years in Gabon in 1906 and 1907, and wrote and lectured about her experiences for American audiences.

== Early life ==
Simonton was born in Pittsburgh, Pennsylvania, the daughter of Jefferson Wilson Simonton and Lydia Ellen Hoover Simonton.

== Career ==
Simonton toured Gabon in 1906 and 1907, working with American primate researcher Richard Lynch Garner in Gabon; she timed the trip partly to escape a subpoena to testify at the murder trial of Harry Thaw. She wrote critically, and sometimes in lurid detail, about brutality in rubber camps, about sexual exploitation in colonial households, and about western missionaries in Africa, in a 1909 series of newspaper articles for the Africa Mail, and in her novel Hell's Playground (1912). Her novel formed the basis of the controversial play and films titled White Cargo (1929, 1942), without her permission. She sued and won significant damages from the play's producers, then sold the film rights.

She wrote for popular national magazines, including Theodore Dreiser's The Delineator and McCall's. Simonton also lectured on her travels, presenting herself as an expert on Africa and race, while reinforcing many racist stereotypes about Africans. She was planning to lead a trade expedition in West Africa in 1915 for the American Tropical Trading Company, before World War I prevented such travel. She gave a speech about the condition of women in Armenia, in Atlanta in 1920.

During World War I, Simonton was involved in Liberty Loan fund drives and helped to organize the American Woman's League for Self-Defense. She was president of the Women's Military Reserve of the United States. In the 1920s she made further world travels, in South America, the Pacific, and Asia, saying "I am interested in the condition of women all over the world".

== Personal life ==
Simonton died in New York City in 1931, aged 60 years. A collection of her postcards from Africa is held by the Amistad Research Center.
