= Handy Andy (1921 film) =

1921 film

- Directed by: Bert Wynne
- Written by: Samuel Lover; Eliot Stannard
- Starring: Peter Coleman; Kathleen Vaughan; Warwick Ward; Wallace Bosco
- Production company: Ideal Film Company
- Distributed by: Ideal Film Company
- Release date: 1921
- Country: United Kingdom
- Language: English

Handy Andy is a 1921 British silent comedy film directed by Bert Wynne and starring Peter Coleman, Kathleen Vaughan and Warwick Ward.

== Cast ==
- Peter Coleman - Handy Andy
- Kathleen Vaughan - Una O'Reilly
- Warwick Ward - Squire O'Grady
- John Wyndham - Michael Dwyer
- Wallace Bosco - Murphy
- Fred Morgan - Squire O'Grady
- May Price - Ragged Ann
- Hessel Crayne - Dr. Browling
