= Single Life (film) =

1921 film

- Directed by: Edwin J. Collins
- Written by: Adrian Johnstone
- Starring: Campbell Gullan; Kathleen Vaughan; Sidney Paxton; Cyril Raymond
- Production company: Ideal Film Company
- Distributed by: Ideal Film Company
- Release date: 1921
- Country: United Kingdom
- Language: English

Single Life is a 1921 British silent drama film directed by Edwin J. Collins and starring Campbell Gullan, Kathleen Vaughan, and Sidney Paxton.

== Cast ==
- Campbell Gullan - Gerald Hunter
- Kathleen Vaughan - Hester
- Sidney Paxton - John Pierce
- Evelyn Hope (actress) - Madame Roland
- Cyril Raymond - John Henty
