= Hangar 17 =

British children's music and variety television programme

- Genre: Children's variety show
- Presented by: Mickey Hutton
- Country of origin: United Kingdom
- Original language: English
- No. of series: 3
- No. of episodes: 32

Production
- Production location: BBC Elstree Centre
- Running time: 25 minutes

Original release
- Network: BBC1
- Release: 10 January 1992 – 29 March 1994

Hangar 17 is a children's variety show for 9- to 13-year-olds that aired on BBC1 from 10 January 1992 to 29 March 1994. The show was presented by stand-up comedian Mickey Hutton and featured a mixture of jugglers, mime artists and comedians along with the more usual musical guests. In the first series the show promoted unsigned musical guests during a Battle of the Bands feature, but this idea was dropped from the second series in favour of more established acts such as Take That and East 17. The show also featured BRIT School pupil Paul Leyshon as the show's resident DJ who joined in the second series and was produced by Peter Leslie. Both Hutton and Leyshon were joined by actress Colette Brown for the final series.

The show was filmed in a hangar that used to store planes. It was produced by Chris Pilkington and lasted for three series. Despite previously having not been a television writer, Daniel Peacock jointly wrote the second and third series with Hutton.

== Transmissions ==
Series	Start date	End date	Episodes
1	10 January 1992	27 March 1992	10
2	12 January 1993	16 March 1993	10
3	11 January 1994	29 March 1994	12

== Reception ==
The Daily Mirror said Hangar 17 is "a fun, fast and furious show with pop bands, games and celebrity guests".
