= Too Young to Love (film) =

1959 film by Muriel Box

- Original British quad poster
- Directed by: Muriel Box
- Written by: Muriel Box; Sydney Box
- Based on: Pickup Girl (play) by Elsa Shelley
- Produced by: Herbert Smith; Sydney Box
- Starring: Thomas Mitchell; Pauline Hahn; Joan Miller
- Cinematography: Gerald Gibbs
- Edited by: Jean Barker
- Music by: Bruce Montgomery
- Production company: Welbeck Films Ltd.
- Distributed by: J. Arthur Rank Film Distributors (UK)
- Release date: March 1960
- Running time: 88 minutes
- Country: United Kingdom
- Language: English

Too Young to Love is a 1960 British drama film set in New York. It was directed by Muriel Box and starring Pauline Hahn, Joan Miller, and Austin Willis. It was based on the play Pickup Girl by Elsa Shelley. An adaptation of the story was broadcast on British TV on 6 December 1957 in the ITV Television Playhouse series.

== Plot ==
In New York, a policeman and a neighbour watch as a middle-aged man and a young man enter a house where a young girl can be seen getting ready for bed. After the young man leaves, the policeman enters the house to make an arrest. In a juvenile court hearing, it emerges that the 15-year-old Elizabeth has been found in a compromising position in her bedroom with a 47-year-old man, Mr Elliot. Elizabeth is one of four children in a struggling working-class family; her mother is a hard-working cook, and her father went into debt while unemployed, later finding a job in California. In the evenings, at the home of an older girl, Ruby Lockwood, teenagers have frequent dance and necking parties, sometimes attended by older men. Eventually, Elizabeth recounts her story (in flashback) before the judge. Elizabeth's life is grim and joyless, and she has been neglected due to her parents' constant absence and lack of guidance. Led astray by Ruby, she has sex with a sailor and has an abortion. The judge is sympathetic, but a report sent to the judge puts Elizabeth's fate in the balance.

== Cast ==
- Pauline Hahn as Elizabeth Collins
- Joan Miller as Mrs Collins
- Austin Willis as Mr Collins
- Vivian Matalon as Larry Webster
- Jess Conrad as Peter Martin
- Sheila Gallagher as Ruby Lockwood
- Alan Gifford as Mr Elliot
- Miki Iveria as Mrs Martin
- Cec Linder as Mr Brill
- Bessie Love as Mrs Busch
- Thomas Mitchell as Judge Bentley
- Cal McCord as Owens
- Robert Henderson as Kellerer
- Bee Duffell as society matron (uncredited)

== Original stage play ==
The film is based on Pickup Girl a 1944 American stage play by actress Elsa Shelley. Variety called it "restrained, thoughtful and distinguished."

The play ran on Broadway in 1944. It ran for 198 performances.

The original British production was directed by Peter Cotes. It was denied a licence by the Lord Chamberlain but played at a theatre club where it was seen by Queen Mary. The play transferred to the West End and was a success in 1946. Cotes later wrote the play "was sensationally successful, and transferred from our tiny theatre in Notting Hill to the West End. It was gratifying to see a smash hit in the heart of London with a team of actors, all of them good, some of them outstanding, but each willing to be a cog in the wheel, none of them playing for self."

== 1957 television play ==
This was adapted for British television in 1957 starring Janet Munro. It was an episode of ITV Television Playhouse. "We're doing the play on documentary lines," said Munro. "Some of the language is a bit violent, and I suppose some people might be a bit shocked. But it's a real life situation."

The Daily Telegraph called it "often moving."

== Production ==
In 1946, Rank offered $50,000 for the film rights to the play, with the idea being to have it made by Bryan Foy's unit at Eagle Lion.

Film rights went to Sydney Box, who decided to make the movie, although it was still set in New York. Muriel Box, who wrote and directed, contacted Elsa Shelley throughout filming to check on the dialogue. The British censor only passed it if Muriel Box edited out any mention of abortion or syphilis. Box refused, and the censor backed down, agreeing that "the film might possibly act as a warning to them (young people) instead of an encouragement to moral laxity."

The film was made through Welbeck, one of Sydney Box's companies. Filming started at Elstree Studios in London on 10 August 1959. Although the story was set in New York, it was filmed in London.

== Reception ==
Sue Harper and Vince Porter wrote, "It was an uncompromising film about the social controls on female chastity, but its visual bleakness and sexual radicalism made it a box office failure."

Variety wrote, "pic shows its stage pedigree only too clearly, being wordy and static. It is set in New York and, on the whole, the atmosphere of a N.Y. juvenile delinquency court is put over authentically. Without overmuch marquee value, the film will depend largely on its sex theme for success at the boxoffice. And it may have a struggle."

TV Guide wrote, "Mitchell does all he can to keep this picture from failing, but it's not enough ... this is hurt mainly by its excess of courtroom scenes."

Monthly Film Bulletin said, "Apart from being pointlessly toned down, Elsa Shelley's old club theatre success has been adapted to the screen with depressingly unimaginative fidelity and an almost total lack of cinema sense. The result is another teenage problem picture in the manner of The Young and the Guilty, at its worst distinguished by Vivian Matalon's tiresome Method parody as the young pimp, and at its best by the reassuring sympathy and strength of Thomas Mitchell's judge."

In British Sound Films David Quinlan wrote: "Modern-day morality play, heavy going."

Leslie Halliwell said: "Tepid filming of a popular exploitation play of the fifties, mysteriously made in England."

Filmink called it "interesting for its female director (Muriel Box) and hilariously over the top and patronising depiction of teenage sexuality – it's about the seduction and disgrace of a 15-year-old girl by various predatory men – rather than actually being a good movie. Too much of it is downright campy... John Waters would enjoy the sobbing mother scenes, the girl's whimpy violin-playing boyfriend, the mentions of "abortion" and "syphilis" and Thomas Mitchell's know-it-all judge."
