= The Old Curiosity Shop (disambiguation) =

The Old Curiosity Shop is a Charles Dickens novel. It may also refer to several adaptations of the novel, including:

- The Old Curiosity Shop (1911 film)
- The Old Curiosity Shop (1913 film)
- The Old Curiosity Shop (1921 film)
- The Old Curiosity Shop (1934 film)
- The Old Curiosity Shop (1975 film)
- The Old Curiosity Shop (1984 film)
- The Old Curiosity Shop (1995 film)
- The Old Curiosity Shop (2007 film)
- The Old Curiosity Shop (TV series)

== See also ==
- Ye Olde Curiosity Shop, a Seattle business
