= Little Nell and Her Grandfather =

Painting by William Holman Hunt

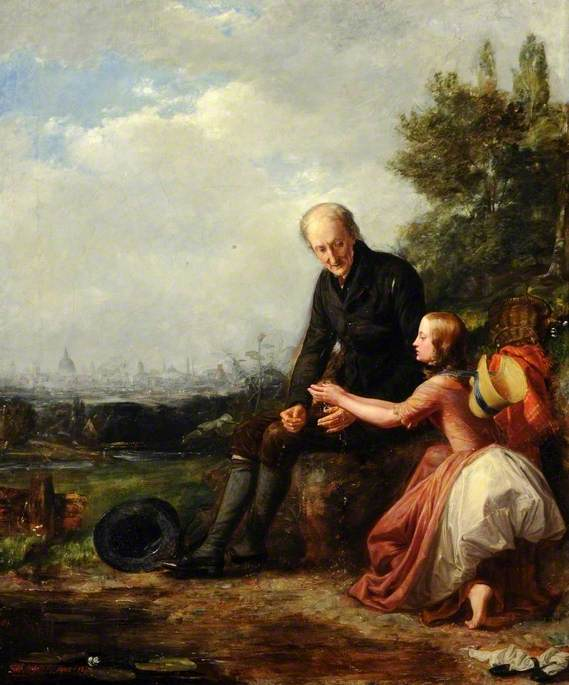
- Artist: William Holman Hunt
- Year: 1845
- Type: Oil on canvas, genre painting
- Dimensions: 111.1 cm × 99 cm (43.7 in × 39 in)
- Location: Graves Art Gallery; Sheffield

Little Nell and Her Grandfather is an 1845 oil painting by the British artist William Holman Hunt. It is inspired by a scene in the novel The Old Curiosity Shop by Charles Dickens. Nell Trent accompanies her grandfather on a journey northwards to escape the ruthless moneylender Daniel Quilp. As they rest for a while at Highgate the skyline of London, including St Paul's Cathedral, can be seen in the distance.

The artist was at the very beginning of the career when he produced this, part of the trend of popular literary depictions of the era. In 1848 he was a co-founder of the Pre-Raphaelite Brotherhood, leading to a dramatic change in his style. The painting was displayed at the 1846 exhibition of the British Institution in London, the first time he had publicly exhibited a work. It is now in the collection of the Graves Art Gallery in Sheffield, having been acquired in 1935.

== Bibliography ==
- Amor, Anne Clark. William Holman Hunt: The True Pre-Raphaelite. Constable, 1989.
- Maas, Jeremy. Holman Hunt and the Light of the World. Scolar Press, 1984.
- Newall, Christopher. Pre-Raphaelites: Beauty and Rebellion. Liverpool University Press, 2016.
