= Dick Swiveller =

Fictional character in The Old Curiosity Shop

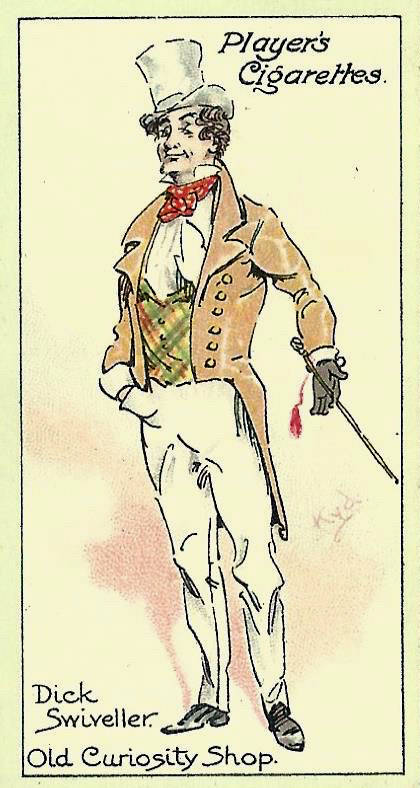
Dick Swiveller by 'Kyd' (1910)

Richard "Dick" Swiveller is a fictional character in the 1841 novel The Old Curiosity Shop by Charles Dickens. Initially a comical accessory to the antagonists in the novel, he undergoes a transformation, becoming a key helpmate bridging the depiction of the main characters that are either mostly villainous or goodly in nature.

== Character ==
Initially, Swiveller is the easily-manipulated friend of Frederick Trent (the wastrel elder brother of Nell Trent), the clerk of Sampson Brass until he is dismissed, and the guardian and eventual husband of the Marchioness. He delights in quoting and adapting literature to describe his experiences. Laid-back in character, he seems to have few worries despite owing money to just about everybody.

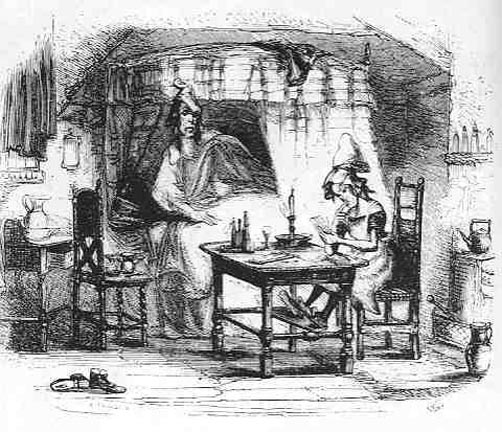
Swiveller and the Marchioness play cards - illustration by Hablot Knight Browne (1840)

Frederick Trent wants Swiveller to marry his sister, Nell, so he'll have the supposed fortune of their grandfather. They have to wait, since Nell is too young to marry. When the destitute Nell and her grandfather leave London, Swiveller is befriended by the villainous Quilp, who to keep him under his eye helps him gain employment as a clerk with the unscrupulous siblings Sally and Sampson Brass. While at the Brasses he meets their little half-starved servant, who does not know her own name or age, whom he nicknames "the Marchioness". Swiveller says to her, "Why, how thin you are! What do you mean by it?" He instantly rushes to the nearest public house and returns with a boy, "...who bore in one hand a plate of bread and beef, and in the other a great pot, filled with some very fragrant compound, which sent forth a grateful steam, and was indeed choice purl, made after a particular recipe which Mr Swiveller had imparted to the landlord, at a period when he was deep in his books and desirous to conciliate his friendship." He teaches her to play cribbage and she later repays his kindness to her by nursing him through a fever.

Following Fred's departure from the story Swiveller becomes more independent and eventually is seen as a strong force for good. He becomes aware of the Brasses' villainy and, with the help of the Marchioness, exposes a plot to frame Kit Nubbles and secures his release from prison. Later he inherits money from his aunt, puts the Marchioness through school, renames her 'Sophronia Sphynx' and ultimately marries her. His transformation from an idle and vacant youth to a key helpmate bridges the depiction of the main characters that are either mostly villainous or goodly in nature.

== Notable portrayals ==
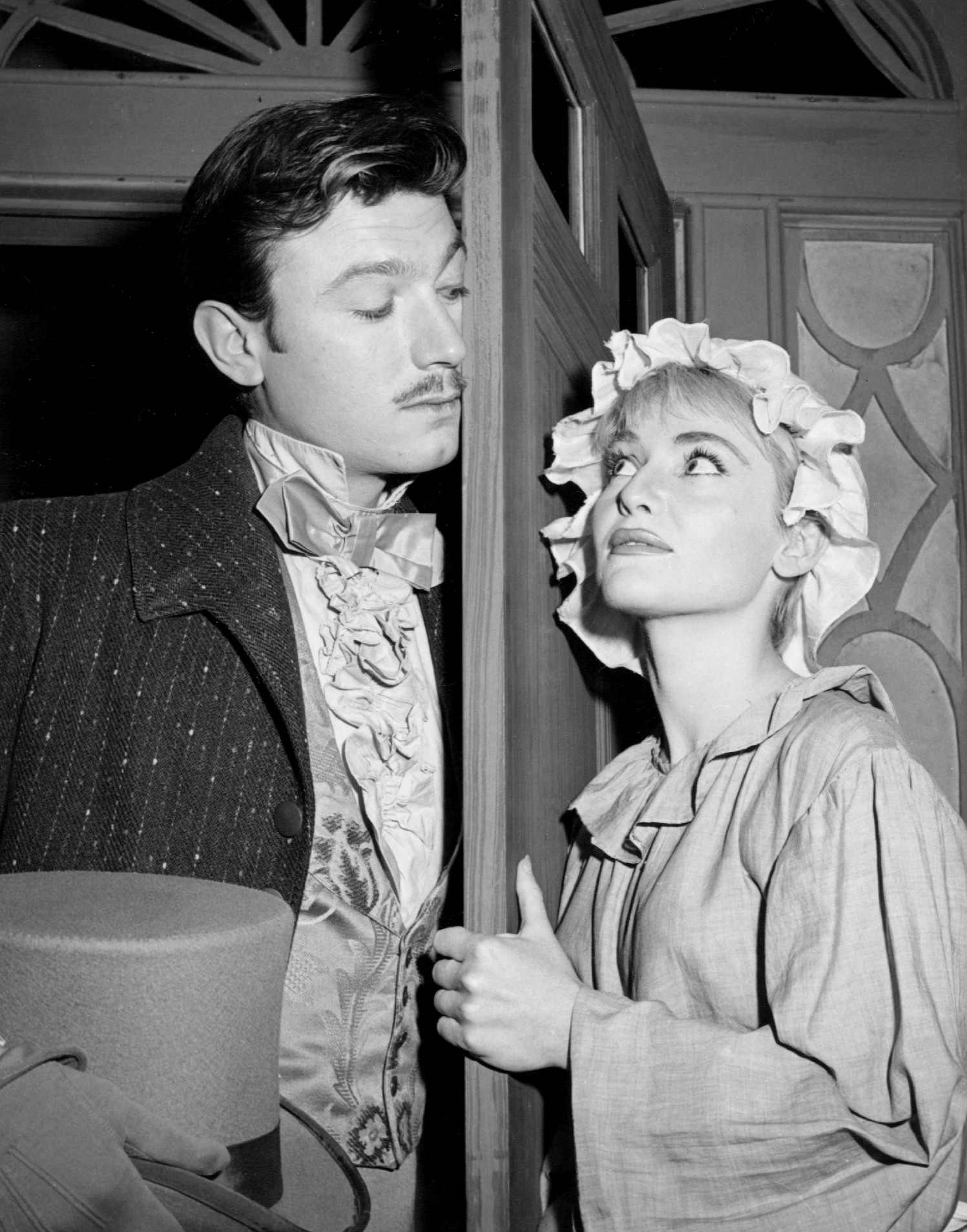
Laurence Harvey as Swiveller and Diane Cilento as the Marchioness in 'The Small Servant' (1955)

Actors who played the character in early performances on stage include William J. Le Moyne and James Lewis.

Other actors to play the role in film and television include:

- Willie West in The Old Curiosity Shop (1914)
- Colin Craig in The Old Curiosity Shop (1921)
- Reginald Purdell in The Old Curiosity Shop (1934)
- Laurence Harvey in 'The Small Servant' episode of The Alcoa Hour (1955)
- Anton Rodgers in The Old Curiosity Shop (1962)
- David Hemmings in Mister Quilp (1975)
- Granville Saxton in The Old Curiosity Shop (1979)
- Adam Blackwood in The Old Curiosity Shop (1995 TV film)
- Geoff Breton in The Old Curiosity Shop (2007)
