= Sampson Brass =

Fictional character by Charles Dickens

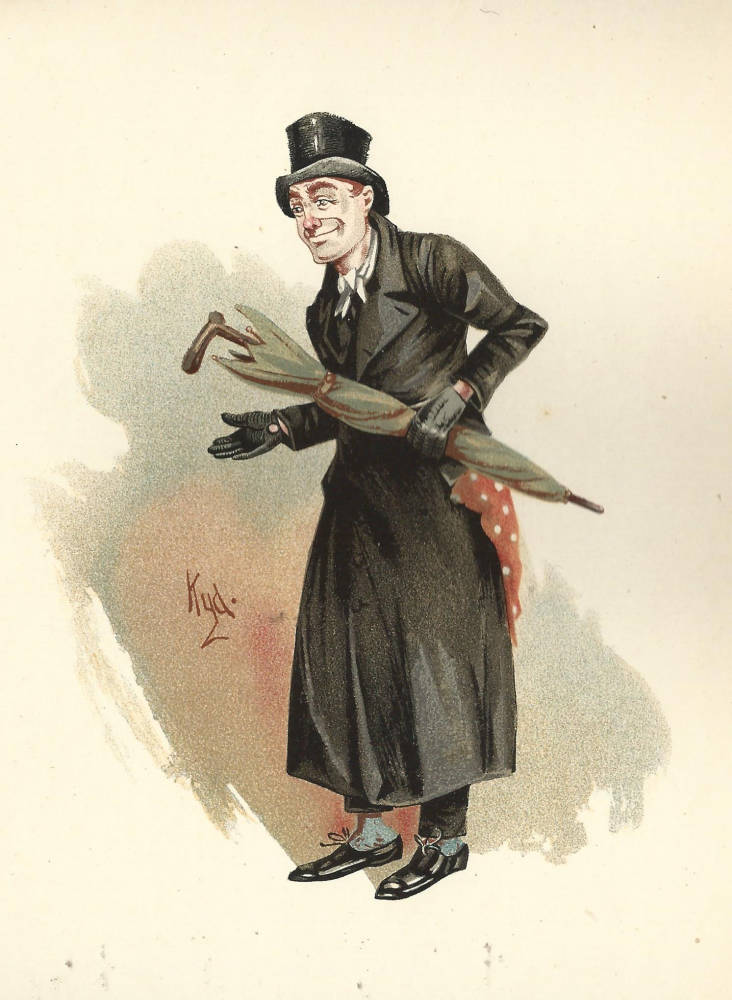
Sampson Brass by 'Kyd' (1890)

Sampson Brass is a fictional character in the 1841 novel The Old Curiosity Shop by Charles Dickens. He is a corrupt attorney who affects feeling for his clients, whom he then cheats. Among his clients is the villainous Daniel Quilp, the novel's antagonist. From Bevis Marks in the city of London, he assists Quilp in fraudulently gaining possession of Nell's grandfather's house, plots against Kit Nubbles, and hires and then dismisses Dick Swiveller.

In the novel Dickens describes him:

He had a cringing manner, but a very harsh voice; and his blandest smiles were so extremely forbidding, that to have had his company under the least repulsive circumstances, one would have wished him to be out of temper that he might only scowl.

In Chapter 12 Dickens writes that Brass was “the ugliest piece of goods in all the stock”, implying that he is an item for sale, like any other at The Old Curiosity Shop.

He is assisted in his scheming by his sister Sally Brass, who also acts as her brother’s partner at the law firm. "The other was his clerk, assistant, housekeeper, secretary, confidential plotter, adviser, intriguer, and bill of cost increaser, Miss Brass – a kind of Amazon at common law."

== Notable portrayals ==
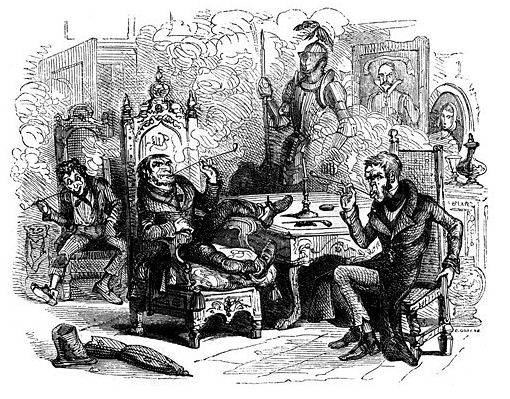
Quilp plots with Sampson Brass, illustration by 'Phiz' for The Old Curiosity Shop (1840)

- S. May - The Old Curiosity Shop (1914)
- Cecil Bevan - The Old Curiosity Shop (1921)
- Gibb McLaughlin - The Old Curiosity Shop (1934)
- David Warner - Mister Quilp (1975)
- Colin Jeavons - The Old Curiosity Shop (1979)
- Adam Godley - The Old Curiosity Shop (2007)
