= Nell Trent =

Fictional character in The Old Curiosity Shop

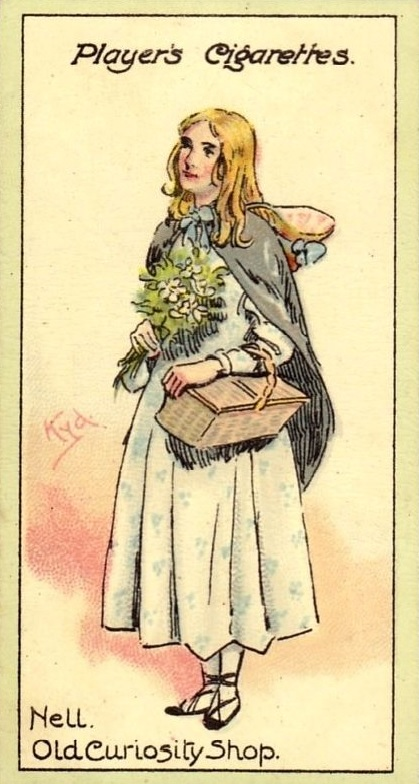
Nell Trent by 'Kyd' (1910)

Nell Trent, also referred to as Little Nell, is a fictional character in the 1841 novel The Old Curiosity Shop by Charles Dickens. The novel's main character, she is portrayed as infallibly good and virginal. An orphan, she leads her grandfather on their journey to save them from misery but gradually becomes weaker throughout the journey. Although she finds a home with the help of a schoolmaster, she sickens and dies before her friends in London find her. Her death has been described as "the apotheosis of Victorian sentimentality."

== Character ==
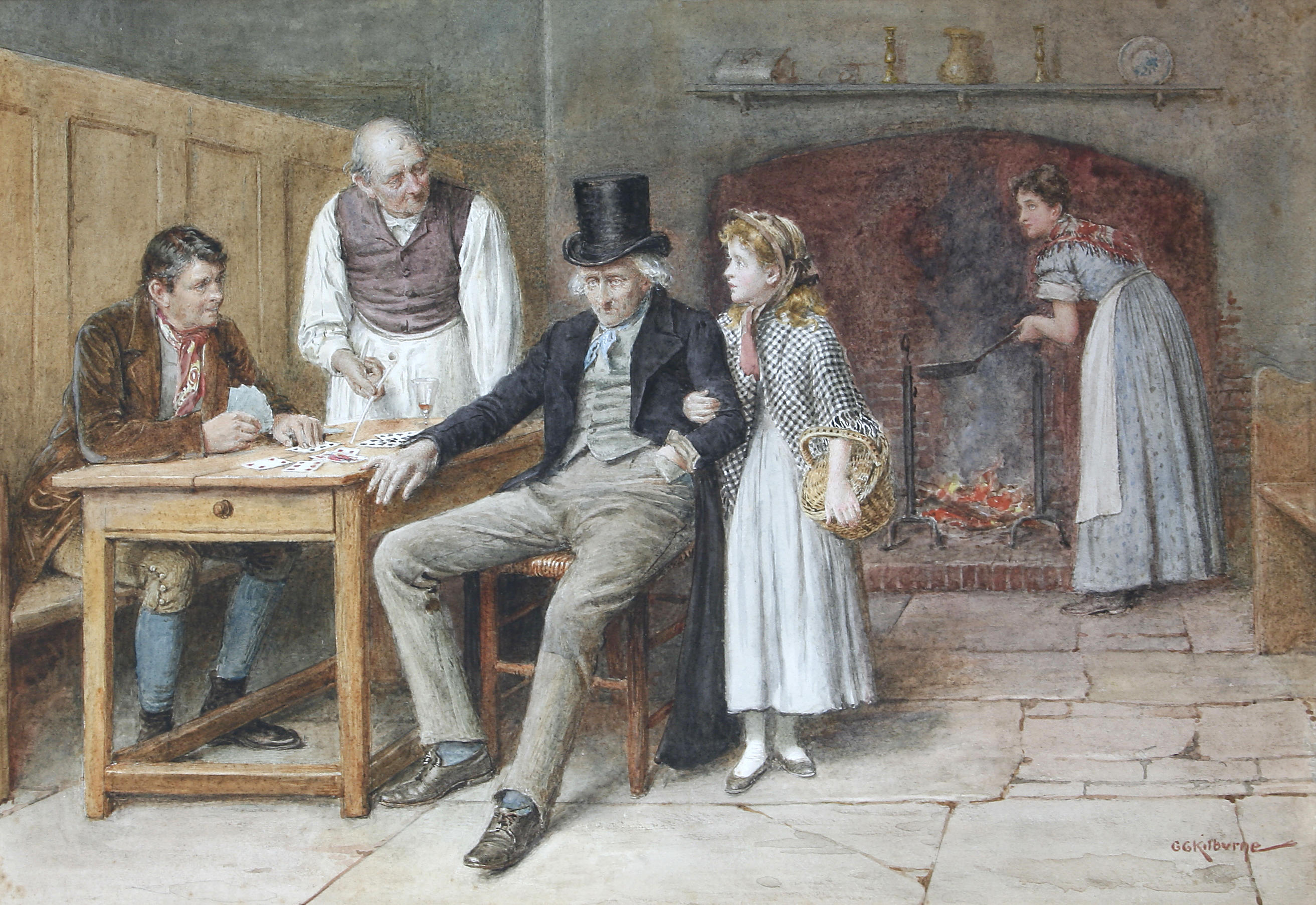
Nell comforts her grandfather - illustration by George Goodwin Kilburne

In the novel Nell Trent is a beautiful and virtuous young girl of "not quite fourteen". An orphan, she lives with her maternal grandfather (whose name is never revealed) in his shop of odds and ends, the Old Curiosity Shop of the title. She lives a lonely life with only one friend, Kit Nubbles, an honest boy employed at the shop, whom she is teaching to write. In an attempt to provide for her once he is gone her grandfather gambles extensively at cards and borrows heavily from the villainous Daniel Quilp, who lusts after Little Nell and hopes eventually to marry her after disposing of his wife. Eventually Quilp seizes possession of the shop and evicts Nell and her grandfather who travel to the Midlands to live as beggars.

The two are pursued by Nell's wastrel older brother, Frederick, who is convinced that Nell has a secret fortune, and by the good-natured but easily led Dick Swiveller. They are joined by Quilp who knows that there is no fortune, but sadistically chooses to 'help' them to enjoy the misery it will inflict on all concerned. Quilp begins to try to track Nell down, but the fugitives are not easily discovered. Nell, having fallen in with a number of characters, some villainous and some kind, succeeds in leading her grandfather to safety in a far-off village (identified by Dickens as Tong, Shropshire), but this comes at a considerable cost to Nell's health.

A mysterious 'single gentleman' (who later turns out to be the younger brother of Nell's grandfather - and is revealed as Master Humphrey, the narrator) is also searching for Nell and her grandfather. Quilp is hunted down and dies trying to escape his pursuers. By the time Nell is found by her rescuers she has died as a result of her arduous journey. Her grandfather, already mentally infirm, refuses to admit she is dead and sits every day by her grave waiting for her to come back until, a few months later, he dies himself.

== Death of Little Nell ==
"At rest" - Nell on her deathbed - illustration by George Cattermole

Dickens describes the death of Nell:

She was dead. No sleep so beautiful and calm, so free from trace of pain, so fair to look upon. She seemed a creature fresh from the hand of God, and waiting for the breath of life; not one who had lived and suffered death. Her couch was dressed with here and there some winter berries and green leaves, gathered in a spot she had been used to favour. "When I die, put near me something that has loved the light, and had the sky above it always." Those were her words.

She was dead. Dear, gentle, patient, noble Nell was dead. Her little bird – a poor slight thing the pressure of a finger would have crushed – was stirring nimbly in its cage; and the strong heart of its child-mistress was mute and motionless for ever. Where were the traces of her early cares, her sufferings, and fatigues? All gone. Sorrow was dead indeed in her, but peace and perfect happiness were born; imaged in her tranquil beauty and profound repose.

Her death caused a sensation among readers at the time, with many dismayed by Dickens killing the much-loved central character. Dickens received numerous letters from readers begging him to let Nell live. In America crowds waited anxiously at the dockside for the ships arriving from England to hear of the fate of Little Nell. However, others thought the ending melodramatic and overly sentimental, with later writers describing it as "the apotheosis of Victorian sentimentality." Ada Leverson reported that her friend Oscar Wilde once said, "One must have a heart of stone to read the death of Little Nell without laughing", while Aldous Huxley described the passage as "inept and vulgarly sentimental".

== Little Nell's grave ==
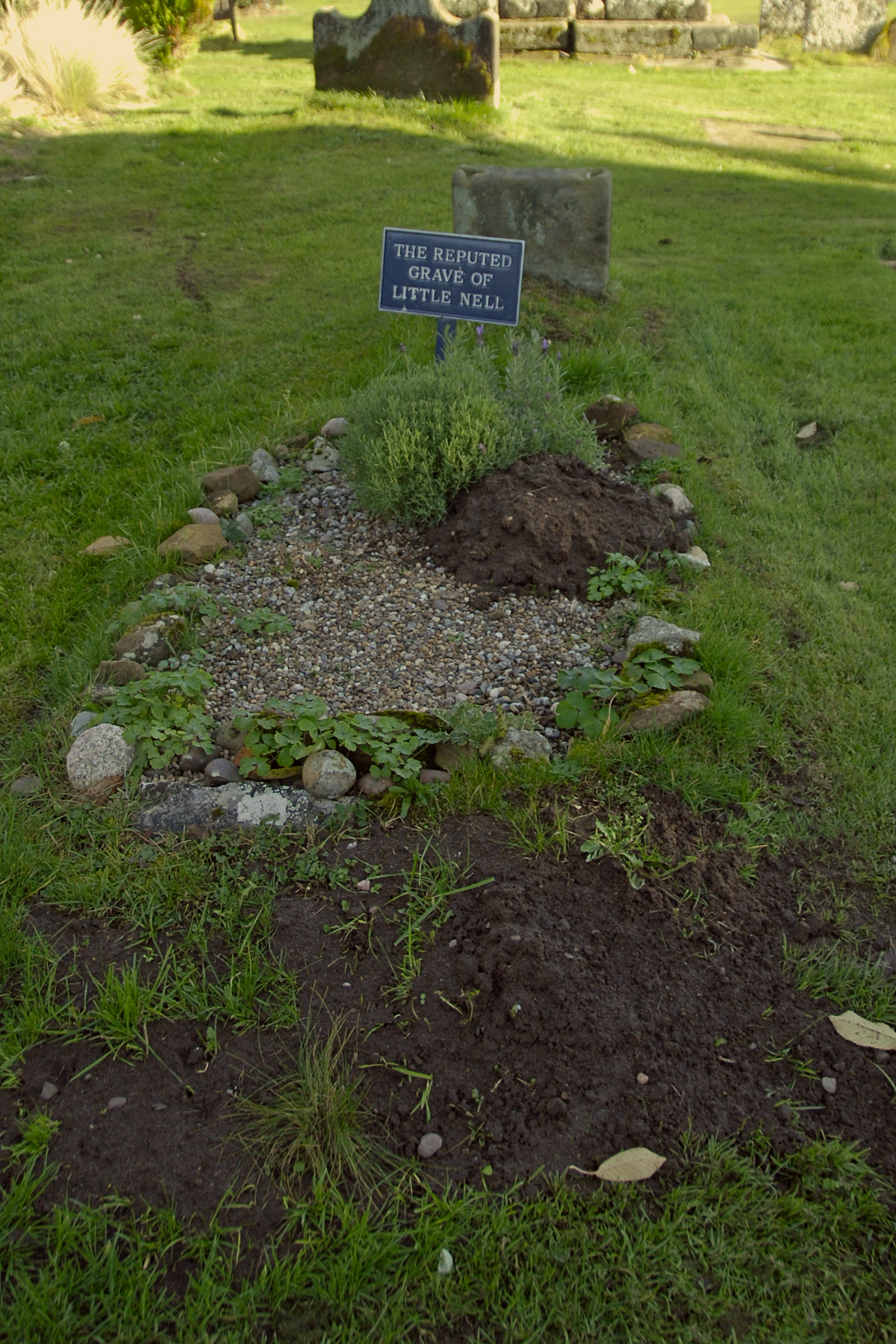
Reputed grave of Little Nell in St Bartholomew's churchyard

The reputed grave of Nell Trent is in the churchyard of St Bartholomew's Church in Tong in Shropshire where there is a plot that has a little metal plate attached to it which reads "The reputed grave of Little Nell".

The "grave" is thought to have come about because Charles Dickens's novel was serialised and shipped over to the United States where it was very popular, and as a result, Americans began coming over to England to visit scenes featured in the book. The tourists recognised the references to Tong church from the book and came to view the supposed "grave", which of course was not there.

However, in about 1910, a verger and village postmaster, George H. Boden (1856–1943), apparently asked local people to pay for a headstone, forged an entry in the church register of burials (apparently the giveaway was that he used post office ink to do this), and charged people to see the "grave". The marker has been moved from time to time to make way for genuine graves. Despite being a fake and also that Nell is a fictitious character, the grave has attracted many visitors including some from as far afield as America.

Tong has been identified as the setting for Nell's death because Dickens' grandmother was the housekeeper at Tong Castle and whilst he was staying at nearby Albrighton to visit her, he is said to have penned the closing lines in the novel. Dickens himself confirmed this to the clergy in the church of Tong after publication of The Old Curiosity Shop, with Dickens also describing the church as "...a very aged, ghostly place".

== Notable portrayals ==
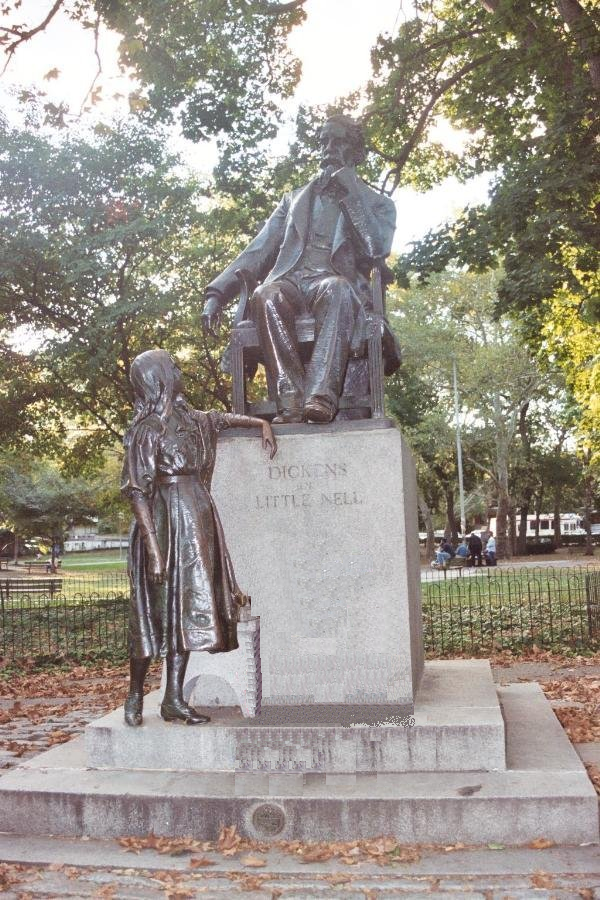
Dickens and Little Nell, an 1890 statue by Francis Edwin Elwell exhibited in Philadelphia

- Mai Deacon - The Old Curiosity Shop (1914)
- Nelly, an opera based on the novel, by Italian composer Lamberto Landi, was composed in 1916; it premiered in Lucca in 1947.
- Mabel Poulton - The Old Curiosity Shop (1921)
- Elaine Benson - The Old Curiosity Shop (1934)
- Michele Dotrice - The Old Curiosity Shop (1962)
- Sarah-Jane Varley - Mister Quilp (1975)
- Natalie Ogle - The Old Curiosity Shop (1979)
- Harumi Ichiryuusai - Sasurai no Shoujo Nell 「さすらいの少女ネル」 (1979-1980, Japanese TV animation series)
- Teresa Gallagher - in a BBC Radio 4 adaptation broadcast in 1998
- Emily Chenery - in a second adaptation for BBC Radio 4 first broadcast in 2002-03
- Sophie Vavasseur - The Old Curiosity Shop (2007)
- Imogen Faires - Dickensian (2015–16)
