= Sophie Vavasseur =

Irish actress (born 1992)

- Born: Sophie Vavasseur; 10 May 1992 (age 34); Dublin, Ireland
- Occupation: Actress
- Years active: 2002–present

Sophie Vavasseur (born 10 May 1992) is an Irish actress and television presenter, best known for her award-nominated role as Evelyn Doyle in the Irish film Evelyn.

== Career ==
Born in Dublin, Ireland, the fourth child of plumber Christopher Vavasseur, who died when she was 16, and Adrienne, Vavasseur has appeared in films and on stage, and has done a number of advertisements and voice-overs. She has acted in several films to date. The first was Evelyn, in which she played the title role (the daughter of Pierce Brosnan's character). The second was Resident Evil: Apocalypse in which she played Angela "Angie" Ashford, the daughter of T-virus creator Charles Ashford. Film credits also include the IMAX film Country Music: The Spirit of America. On stage, she appeared in Come On Over by Conor McPherson at the Gate Theatre.

In 2007, Vavasseur appeared in Becoming Jane, a movie based on the private life of Jane Austen; that same year, she starred in a British television adaptation of Charles Dickens's The Old Curiosity Shop. In 2010, she appeared as a possessed teenager in the Spanish horror film Exorcismus, alongside Richard Felix, Doug Bradley and Stephen Billington.

In 2023, she presented Love, Style, Repeat, a fashion programme for Virgin Media Ireland.

== Filmography ==
=== Film ===
Year	Title	Role	Notes
2002	Evelyn	Evelyn Doyle	
2003	Country Music: The Spirit of America	Credited	IMAX documentary
2004	Resident Evil: Apocalypse	Angela "Angie" Ashford	
2007	Becoming Jane	Jane Lefroy	
2010	Exorcismus	Emma Evans	
2014	Poison Pen	Jessica	
2017	Bring It On: Worldwide Cheersmack	Hannah	Direct-to-video film
2020	Picture Perfect Royal Christmas	Duchess Catherine	
2021	Lost & Found in Rome	Emma Thorndyke	
2021	The Seed	Heather	
2021	Alice, Through the Looking	Emma	
2022	Mr. Malcom's List	Lady Gwyneth Amberton	
2023	Flora and Son	Juanita	
2026	Power Ballad	Amanda	

=== Television ===
Year	Title	Role	Notes
2007	Northanger Abbey	Annie Thorpe	Television film
2007	The Old Curiosity Shop	Nell Trent	Television film
2009	Masterpiece	Nell Trent	Episode: The Old Curiosity Shop
2017	Vikings	Princess Ellisif	2 episodes
2023	Love, Style, Repeat	Presenter	one-off episode
