= Sandra Payne (actress) =

English actress (born 1944)

- Born: Sandra Payne; 24 September 1944 (age 81); Royston, Hertfordshire, England
- Education: Italia Conti Academy of Theatre Arts
- Occupation: Actress
- Years active: 1963–1996
- Spouses: Alan Jay Lerner (m. 1974; div. 1976) Roy Boulting (m. 1979; div. 1983)

Sandra Payne (born 24 September 1944, Royston, Hertfordshire) is an English actress best known for her roles as Miss Mckenzie in Only Fools and Horses, Christine Harris in the British television series Triangle and as Marion Ballard in Waiting for God.

== Career ==
Payne attended Selhurst Grammar School and the Italia Conti Academy. She then acted in repertory theatre before appearing on television in the 1960s in the soap operas Compact, The Newcomers and Z-Cars. In 1978, she appeared as Phillipa in The Professionals episode "Blind Run". Payne appeared as a character called "Penny" in the 1979 Christmas special and final episode of George and Mildred.

She also appeared as Mrs. Quilp in The Old Curiosity Shop, as Miss Taylor in The Wildcats of St Trinian's (1980), as Eryl Griffith in the 1985 television movie Agatha Christie's Miss Marple: The Moving Finger, as Mrs Micawber in David Copperfield (1986) and as Miss Mackenzie (Council Housing Officer) in the Only Fools and Horses episode "Homesick" (1983).

== Personal life ==
Payne was married to the American lyricist Alan Jay Lerner from 1974 to 1976. Payne was Lerner's sixth wife— he and Payne married in Port au Prince, Haiti, on 10 December 1974, one day after Lerner received a Haitian divorce from his fifth wife.

In 1979, Payne married English filmmaker Roy Boulting; they divorced in 1983. Boulting directed Payne in Agatha Christie's Miss Marple: The Moving Finger in 1985.

== Filmography ==
=== Film ===
Year	Title	Role	Notes
1980	The Wildcats of St. Trinian's	Miss Taylor	

=== Television ===
Year	Title	Role	Notes
1963	The Plane Makers	Secretary	Episode: "Lover Come Back"
1963–1964	Compact	Wendy Millet	26 episodes
1964	Gideon's Way	Alice Short	Episode: "The Big Fix"
1964	The Likely Lads	Sheila Mills	Episode: "Older Women Are More Experienced"
1965	Emergency Ward 10	Marlene	Episode: #1.780
1965	Sherlock Holmes	Violet Westbury	Episode: "The Bruce-Partington Plans"
1965	The Troubleshooters	Sue Andrews	Episode: "Young Turk"
1965	Riviera Police	Ilia Dutton	Episode: "There Comes a Point"
1964–1965	ITV Play of the Week	Girl Nurse	2 episodes
1965–1969	The Newcomers	Janet Langley	257 episodes
1971	Scene		Episode: "Clean Sweep"
1972	Man at the Top	Janet Adams Lady Hudson	3 episodes
1964–1972	Z Cars	Jean Beryl	3 episodes
1972	General Hospital	Doreen Richards	2 episodes
1974	Miss Nightingate	Pearl Pringle	Television film
1974	Microbes and Men	Marie Semmelweis	Episode: "The Invisible Enemy"
1978	1990	Barbara Fairlie	2 episodes
1978	Scorpion Tales	Karen Oldfield	Episode: "The Ghost in the Pale Blue Dress"
1978	The Sweeney	Meryl	Episode: "Latin Lady"
1978	The Professionals	Phillipa	Episode: "Blind Run"
1979	Tales of the Unexpected	Miss Pulteney	Episode: "Mrs. Bixby and the Colonel's Coat"
1979	Atom Spies	Marianne Pontecorvo	Television film
1979	Shelley	Angie	Episode: "Gainfully Unemployed"
1979	George and Mildred	Penelope	Episode: "The Twenty-Six Year Itch"
1979	Collision Course	Ruth Penderson	Television film
1979–1980	The Old Curiosity Shop	Mrs. Quilp	6 episodes
1980	All Creatures Great and Small	Marjorie Gillard	Episode: "Home and Away"
1980	Just Liz	Liz Parker	6 episodes
1982–1983	Triangle	Christine Harris	52 episodes
1983	Only Fools and Horses	Margaret MacKenzie	Episode: "Homesick"
1985	Agatha Christie's Miss Marple: The Moving Finger	Eryl Griffith	2 episodes
1986	Never the Twain	Belinda	Episode: "In Whom We Tryst"
1986	David Copperfield	Mrs Micawber	4 episodes
1988	Jack the Ripper	Mrs. Acland	2 episodes
1990–1994	Waiting for God	Marion Ballard	46 episodes
1996	Roger Roger	Pam	Television film
