= The Old Curiosity Shop (1921 film) =

1921 silent film by Thomas Bentley

- Directed by: Thomas Bentley
- Written by: J. A. Atkinson
- Based on: The Old Curiosity Shop (novel) by Charles Dickens
- Produced by: George Pearson
- Starring: Mabel Poulton; William Lugg; Hugh E. Wright; Pino Conti
- Production company: Welsh-Pearson
- Distributed by: Jury Films
- Release date: April 1921
- Country: United Kingdom
- Language: Silent (English intertitles)

The Old Curiosity Shop is a 1921 British silent drama film directed by Thomas Bentley and starring Mabel Poulton, William Lugg and Hugh E. Wright. It is based on the 1841 novel The Old Curiosity Shop by Charles Dickens. Bentley remade the novel as a sound film in 1934.

== Cast ==
- Mabel Poulton as Little Nell
- William Lugg as Grandfather
- Hugh E. Wright as Tom Codlin
- Pino Conti as Daniel Quilp
- Bryan Powley as Single Gentleman
- Barry Livesey as Tom Scott
- Cecil Bevan as Sampson Brass
- Beatie Olna Travers as Sally Brass
- Minnie Rayner as Mrs. Jarley
- Dennis Harvey as Short Trotters
- Dezma du May as Mrs. Quilp
- Colin Craig as Dick Swiveller
- Fairy Emlyn as Mr. Marton
- A. Harding Steerman as Mr. Marton
