= Cecil Bevan =

British actor (1875–1953)

Cecil Bevan's 1939 Spotlight photo

Cecil Stuart Reginald Bevan (May 1, 1875 – January 22, 1953) was a British supporting and character actor on stage and screen.

== Early life ==
Bevan was born in London, the son of a clergyman, Reverend Cecil Bevan. He worked as an accountant and partnership agent, and acted as an amateur with groups including the Romany Amateur Dramatic Club at St. George's Hall, London in 1900, and the Phoenix Amateur Dramatic Club at the Bijou Theatre, London, in 1901.

== Career ==
By 1907, Bevan had begun acting professionally with George Alexander's company in Alfred Sutro's new play, John Glayde's Honour. He also appeared with the Herbert Sleath Company and the London Repertory Theatre under its director J. T. Grein.

In 1912, he played the governor of HM Prison Holloway in a satirical play by Lillie Langtry titled Helping the Cause, in which Langtry played a militant suffragist. The play, with the cast including Langtry, Bevan, Leonora Braham and Alfred Mansfield, toured the United Kingdom and the United States.

In the 1910s and 1930s-40s, Bevan appeared in West End theatres in supporting roles in plays by dramatists such as Harley Granville-Barker, Elmer Rice, Jerome K. Jerome, and Julius J. and Philip G. Epstein. He received praise for his performances, in particular for his role as Christopher Branley in John Glayde's Honour by Alfred Sutro (1907-1908), Captain Montgomerie in W. Somerset Maugham's Lady Frederick (1908), and Dr. O'Shea in Roland Pertwee's Pink String and Sealing Wax (1943).

Bevan also appeared on screen from 1921 to 1952. His performance as Sampson Brass in The Old Curiosity Shop (1921) was described as "excellent". His last appearance on screen was as Reverend Mayne in Autumn Crocus (1952).

== Personal life ==
He married twice, firstly to Violet Gordon Robbins in 1900, and later to Frieda Haesler. He was a member of the Green Room Club and the Conservative Association. He died in 1953 in Tunbridge Wells, Kent, where he had lived for over thirty years.

=== Selected stage performances ===
Year	Title	Author	Theatre	Role	Notes
1900	A Pair of Spectacles	Sydney Grundy, adapted from Les Petits Oiseaux by Eugène Labiche and Alfred Delacour	St. George's Hall, London	Percy Goldfinch	Romany Amateur Dramatic Club
1900	The Money Spinner	Arthur Wing Pinero	St. George's Hall, London	Lord Kingussie	Romany Amateur Dramatic Club
1905	Mrs. L'Estrange	Kinsey Peile	Shaftesbury Theatre, London	Jules	
1907	John Glayde's Honour	Alfred Sutro	Theatre Royal, Bath	Christopher Branley	George Alexander Productions
1908	John Glayde's Honour	Alfred Sutro	Borough Theatre, Stratford; The Kennington Theatre, south-east London	Christopher Branley	George Alexander Company
1908	Lady Frederick	W. Somerset Maugham	King's Theatre, Sunderland; Devonshire Park Theatre, Eastbourne	Captain Montgomerie	
1909	A White Man	Edwin Milton Royle	Theatre Royal, Woolwich; Empire Theatre, Southend-on-Sea	Earl of Kerhill	Herbert Sleath Company
1911	The Quality of Mercy	Hall Caine	Theatre Royal, Manchester	Mr. Pettigrew	John Hart and M. V. Leveaux. World Premiere
1912	Helping the Cause	Percy Fendall and Lillie Langtry	Oldham Coliseum Theatre, Greater Manchester; Glasgow Empire Theatre, Scotland; B. F. Keith's Theater, Cincinnati; Hippodrome Theater (Cleveland, Ohio); Orpheum Theater, Brooklyn, United States	Sir Martyn Mangles, governor of Holloway gaol	
1912	The Right Sort (a short version of The Degenerates)	Sydney Grundy	The Empire Palace Theatre, Leeds	Duke of Orme	
1914-1915	The Dynasts	Thomas Hardy, adapted by Harley Granville-Barker	Kingsway Theatre, London	1st Passenger; Colonel Graham; General Sir Thomas Picton	
1915	On Trial	Elmer Rice	Lyric Theatre, London	Clerk	
1915	The World of Boredom	Adapted from Édouard Pailleron's Le Monde où l'on s'ennuie by Maria Leonard and J. T. Grein	Queen's Theatre, London	Monsieur de Millets	
1915	The Three Patriots	Jerome K. Jerome	Queen's Theatre, London	Doctor	
1915	The Dummy	Harvey J. O'Higgins and Harriet Ford	Prince of Wales Theatre, London	Fisher	
1917	Ruts	Harry Wall	Court Theatre, London	Mr. Boulder	London Repertory Theatre, dir. J. T. Grein
1933	The Brontës	Alfred Sangster	Royalty Theatre, London	William Smith Williams	
1943	Pink String and Sealing Wax	Roland Pertwee	Theatre Royal, Brighton; Theatre Royal, Nottingham; Duke of York's Theatre, London	Dr. O'Shea	
1944	Pink String and Sealing Wax	Roland Pertwee	Phoenix Theatre, London	Dr. O'Shea	
1945	Chicken Every Sunday	Julius J. Epstein and Philip G. Epstein, based on the novel by Rosemary Drachman Taylor	Savoy Theatre, London	Reverend Wilson	

== Filmography ==
Year	Title	Role	Notes
1921	The Old Curiosity Shop	Sampson Brass	
1937	The Elder Brother	Coroner	
1937	Jump for Glory	Cyril	
1937	Night Ride		
1937	The Cavalier of the Streets		
1937	Paradise for Two, released in the US as The Gaiety Girls	Renaud or Renard	
1938	The Beautiful One	Scribe	
1939	Inspector Hornleigh on Holiday	Man In Solicitor's Office	
1942	Let the People Sing	Minor Role	
1943	Subject for Discussion		#5 of the Into Battle series produced by the Ministry of Information
1945	Twilight Hour	Hartley	
1945	Waltz Time	Minister of Health	
1947	The White Unicorn	Clerk to the Assizes	
1948	The Blind Goddess	Morton	
1949	Once Upon a Dream	Wright	
1950	The Reluctant Widow		
1951	Night Was Our Friend	Clerk of the Court	
1952	Autumn Crocus	Reverend Mayne, the clergyman	
