= The Old Curiosity Shop (TV series) =

- DVD cover
- Based on: The Old Curiosity Shop by Charles Dickens
- Written by: William Trevor
- Directed by: Julian Amyes
- Starring: Trevor Peacock; Donald Bisset; Natalie Ogle; Colin Jeavons
- Theme music composer: Carl Davis
- Country of origin: United Kingdom
- Original language: English
- No. of episodes: 9

Production
- Producer: Barry Letts
- Running time: 50 minutes (episode 1) 25 - 30 minutes (episodes 2-9)

Original release
- Network: BBC1
- Release: 9 December 1979 – 3 February 1980

The Old Curiosity Shop is a nine part 1979 BBC TV series based on the 1841 novel by Charles Dickens. It was directed by Julian Amyes, and adapted by William Trevor.

== Cast ==
- Natalie Ogle - Little Nell
- Trevor Peacock - Daniel Quilp
- Sebastian Shaw - Grandfather
- Granville Saxton - Dick Swiveller
- Christopher Fairbank - Kit Nubbles
- Colin Jeavons - Sampson Brass
- Wensley Pithey - Single Gentleman
- Freda Dowie - Sally Brass
- Laurence Hardy - Mr. Witherden
- Keith Hazemore - Abel Garland
- Sandra Payne - Mrs Quilp
- Patsy Byrne - Mrs. Nubbles
- Simon Garstang - Little Jacob
- Annabelle Lanyon - Small Servant
- Brian Oulton - The schoolmaster
- Donald Bisset - Mr. Garland
- Margaret Courtenay - Mrs. Jarley
