= The Old Curiosity Shop (2007 film) =

- Based on: The Old Curiosity Shop by Charles Dickens
- Written by: Martyn Hesford
- Directed by: Brian Percival
- Starring: Derek Jacobi; Sophie Vavasseur; Toby Jones
- Theme music composer: Stephen McKeon
- Country of origin: United Kingdom
- Original language: English

Production
- Producer: Andrew Benson
- Cinematography: Peter Greenhalgh
- Running time: 120 min.
- Production company: Carnival Films

Original release
- Network: ITV
- Release: 26 December 2007

The Old Curiosity Shop is a British television film adapted from the Charles Dickens's 1841 novel The Old Curiosity Shop. It stars Irish actress Sophie Vavasseur as Nell Trent, with Derek Jacobi as her grandfather, Toby Jones as Quilp and George MacKay as Nell's friend, Kit. It was broadcast on 26 December 2007 on ITV. The adaptation is in general very faithful to the novel. The most significant changes are the removal of the Garlands and their household and the identity of the Single Gentleman (here called Jacob) who is changed from Grandfather's brother to his estranged son and Nell's father.

== Cast ==
- Adrian Rawlins as Jacob
- Derek Jacobi as Grandfather
- Zoë Wanamaker as Mrs Jarley
- Toby Jones as Quilp
- Adam Godley as Sampson Brass
- Gina McKee as Sally Brass
- Bryan Dick as Freddie Trent
- Sophie Vavasseur as Nell Trent
- George MacKay as Kit Nubbles
- Steve Pemberton as Mr Short
- Martin Freeman ... Mr Codlin
- Josie Lawrence as Mrs Jiniwin
- Bradley Walsh as Mr Liggers
- Anna Madeley as Betsey Quilp
- Geoff Breton as Dick Swiveller
- Charlene McKenna as The Marchioness
- Kelly Campbell as Mrs Nubbles
- Katie Dunne as Baby Nubbles
- Philip Noone as Rodney (Rogue Trader)

== Critical reception ==
The Hollywood Reporter noted "a sorrowful story of greed, poverty and grief, and ITV's version makes the most of it...Writer Martyn Hesford keeps the story tidy, while director Brian Percival moves things along while helping his cast to resist the temptation to be overly Dickensian...Jacobi finds some vinegar in what could easily be a sweet old man, and Jones gives some shading to Quilp's villainy. Stephen McKeon's versatile score helps considerably." The Guardian wrote "Toby Jones, as the revolting Daniel Quilp, steals just about anything he can get his hands on, including the show."
