= Master Humphrey =

Fictional character in novels by Charles Dickens

Master Humphrey is the narrator and main character in Dickens's serial, Master Humphrey's Clock. He is also the unnamed narrator of the first three chapters of Dickens's 1841 novel The Old Curiosity Shop, which was originally published in that serial. It is revealed in the portion of Master Humphrey's Clock which follows The Old Curiosity Shop that he is also in fact the unnamed 'single gentleman' who appears in the second half of that novel.
