= The Old Curiosity Shop =

1841 novel by Charles Dickens

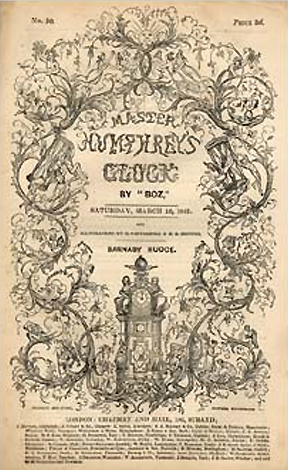
- Cover, the serial in Master Humphrey's Clock, 1840
- Author: Charles Dickens
- Illustrator: George Cattermole; Hablot Knight Browne (Phiz); Samuel Williams; Daniel Maclise
- Cover artist: George Cattermole
- Language: English
- Genre: Novel
- Published: Serialised April 1840 – February 1841; book format 1841
- Publisher: Chapman & Hall London
- Publication place: England
- Media type: Print
- Pages: 306 + 228
- Preceded by: Nicholas Nickleby
- Followed by: Barnaby Rudge
- Text: The Old Curiosity Shop at Wikisource

The Old Curiosity Shop is the fourth novel by English author Charles Dickens; being one of his two novels (the other being Barnaby Rudge) published along with short stories in his weekly serial Master Humphrey's Clock, from 1840 to 1841. It was so popular that New York readers reputedly stormed the wharf when the ship bearing the final instalment arrived in 1841.

The Old Curiosity Shop was printed in book form in 1841 in two volumes. Queen Victoria read the novel that year and found it "very interesting and cleverly written".

The plot follows the journey of Nell Trent and her grandfather, both residents of The Old Curiosity Shop in London, whose lives are thrown into disarray and destitution due to the machinations of an evil moneylender and the grandfather's gambling addiction.

== Synopsis ==
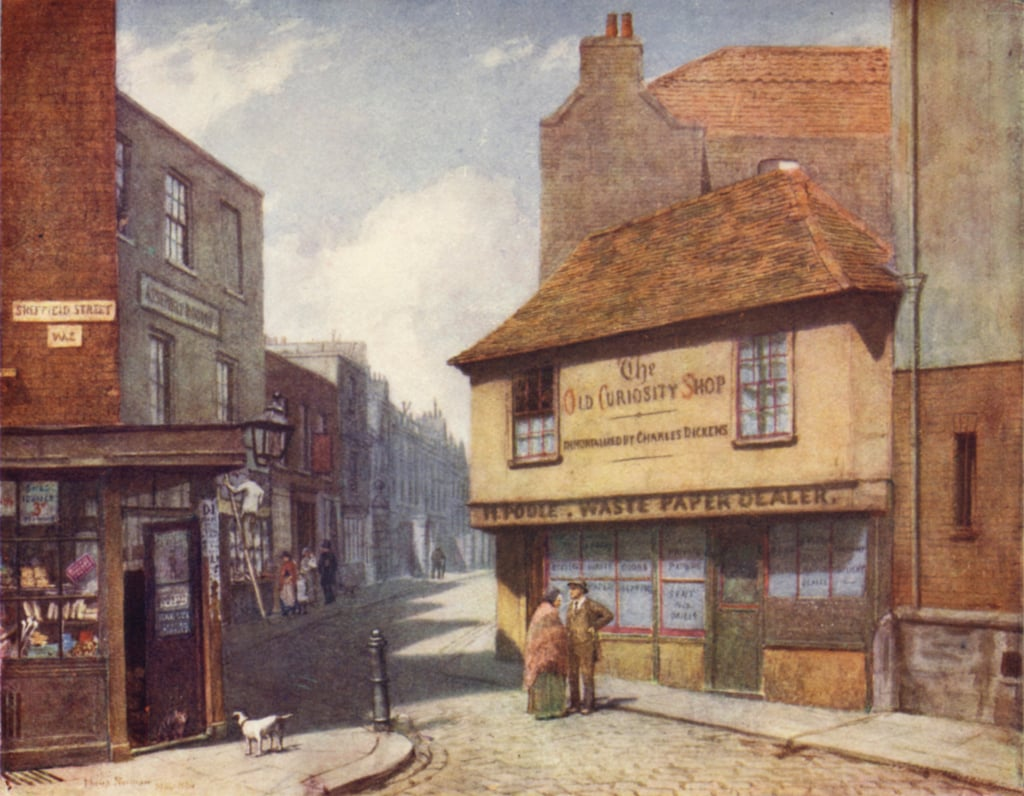
Old Curiosity Shop, Portsmouth Street, 1884 by Philip Norman

The Old Curiosity Shop tells the story of Nell Trent, a beautiful and virtuous young girl of "not quite fourteen". An orphan, she lives with her maternal grandfather (whose name is never revealed) in his shop of odds and ends. Her grandfather loves her dearly, and Nell does not complain, but she lives a lonely existence with almost no friends her own age. Her only friend is Kit, an honest boy employed at the shop, whom she is teaching to write.

Secretly obsessed with ensuring that Nell does not die in poverty as her parents did, her grandfather attempts to provide Nell with a good inheritance through gambling at cards. He keeps his nocturnal games a secret, but borrows heavily from the evil Daniel Quilp, a malicious, grotesquely deformed, hunchbacked dwarf moneylender. In the end, he gambles away what little money they have, and Quilp seizes the opportunity to take possession of the shop and evict Nell and her grandfather. Her grandfather suffers a breakdown that leaves him bereft of his wits, and Nell takes him away to the Midlands of England, to live as beggars.

Convinced that the old man has stored up a large fortune for Nell, her wastrel older brother, Frederick, convinces the good-natured but easily led Dick Swiveller to help him track Nell down, so that Swiveller can marry Nell and share her supposed inheritance with Frederick. To this end, they join forces with Quilp, who knows full well that there is no fortune, but sadistically chooses to 'help' them in order to enjoy the misery it will inflict on all concerned.

Quilp begins to try to track Nell down, but the fugitives are not easily discovered. To keep Dick Swiveller under his eye, Quilp arranges for him to be taken as a clerk by Quilp's lawyer, Mr. Brass. At the Brass firm, Dick befriends the mistreated maidservant and nicknames her 'the Marchioness'.

Nell, having fallen in with a succession of characters, some villainous and some kind, finally succeeds in leading her grandfather to safety in a far-off village (identified by Dickens as Tong, Shropshire), but this comes at a considerable cost to Nell's health.

Meanwhile, Kit has found new employment with the kind Mr and Mrs Garland. Here he is contacted by a mysterious 'single gentleman' who is looking for news of Nell and her grandfather. The 'single gentleman' and Kit's mother go after them unsuccessfully, and encounter Quilp, who is also hunting for the runaways. Quilp forms a grudge against Kit and has him framed as a thief. Kit is sentenced to transportation. However, Dick Swiveller proves Kit's innocence with the help of his friend the Marchioness. Quilp is hunted down and dies trying to escape his pursuers.

At the same time, a coincidence leads Mr Garland to knowledge of Nell's whereabouts, and he, Kit, and the single gentleman (who turns out to be the younger brother of Nell's grandfather) go to find her. Sadly, by the time they arrive, Nell has died as a result of her arduous journey. Her grandfather, already mentally infirm, refuses to admit she is dead and sits every day by her grave waiting for her to come back until, a few months later, he dies himself.

== Framing device ==
Master Humphrey's Clock was a weekly serial that contained both short stories and two novels (The Old Curiosity Shop and Barnaby Rudge). Some of the short stories act as frame stories to the novels.

Originally the conceit of the story was that Master Humphrey was reading it aloud to a group of his friends, gathered at his house around the grandfather clock in which he eccentrically kept his manuscripts. Consequently, when the novel begins, it is told in the first person, with Master Humphrey as the narrator. However, Dickens soon changed his mind about how best to tell the story, and abandoned the first-person narrator after chapter three. Once the novel was ended, Master Humphrey's Clock added a concluding scene, where Master Humphrey's friends (after he has finished reading the novel to them) complain that the 'single gentleman' is never given a name; Master Humphrey tells them that the novel was a true story, that the 'single gentleman' was in fact himself, and that the events of the first three chapters were fictitious, intended only to introduce the characters. This was Dickens's after-the-fact explanation of why the narrator disappeared and why (if he was their near relation) he gave no sign in the first three chapters of knowing who they were. At least one editor thinks this device "need not be taken seriously."

Dickens's original artistic intent was to keep the short stories and the novels together, and the short stories and the novels were published in 1840 in three bound volumes under the title Master Humphrey's Clock, which retains the original full and correct ordering of texts. However, Dickens himself cancelled Master Humphrey's Clock before 1848, and describes in a preface to The Old Curiosity Shop that he wishes the story to not be tied down to the miscellany within which it began. Most later anthologies published the short stories and the novels separately.

== Characters ==
=== Major ===
Nell Trent (left) observes Dick Swiveller (center) an Quilp (right) in the lithograph "Dick Swiveller and Quilp" by artist F. O. C. Darley from Character Sketches from the Works of Charles Dickens (1888, Porter and Coates).

"At Rest" Illustration by George Cattermole

Nell Trent
The novel's main character. Portrayed as infallibly good and angelic, she leads her grandfather on their journey to save them from misery. Her health gradually becomes weaker throughout the journey.
Nell's grandfather
Nell's guardian. After losing both his wife and daughter, he sees Nell as the embodiment of their good spirits. His grandson Fred is seen as the successor to his son-in-law, who he felt unworthy of his daughter. As such, he shows him no affection. He is paranoid about falling into poverty and gambles to try to stave that off; as his money runs out, he turns to Quilp for loans to continue to furnish for Nell the life he feels she deserves. After believing Kit has revealed his secret addiction, he falls ill and is mentally unstable afterwards. Nell then protects him as he had done for her.
Christopher "Kit" Nubbles
Nell's friend and servant. He watches out for Nell when she is left in the shop alone at night (although she doesn't know he's there) and will 'never come home to his bed until he thinks she safe in hers'. After Quilp takes over the shop, Kit offers Nell a place in his house. His mother is concerned about his attachment to Nell, and at one point jokes, 'some people would say that you'd fallen in love with her', at which Kit becomes very bashful and tries to change the subject. He is later given a position at the Garlands' house, and becomes an important member of their household. His dedication to his family earns him the respect of many characters and the resentment of Quilp. He is framed for robbery, but is later released and joins the party traveling to recover Nell.

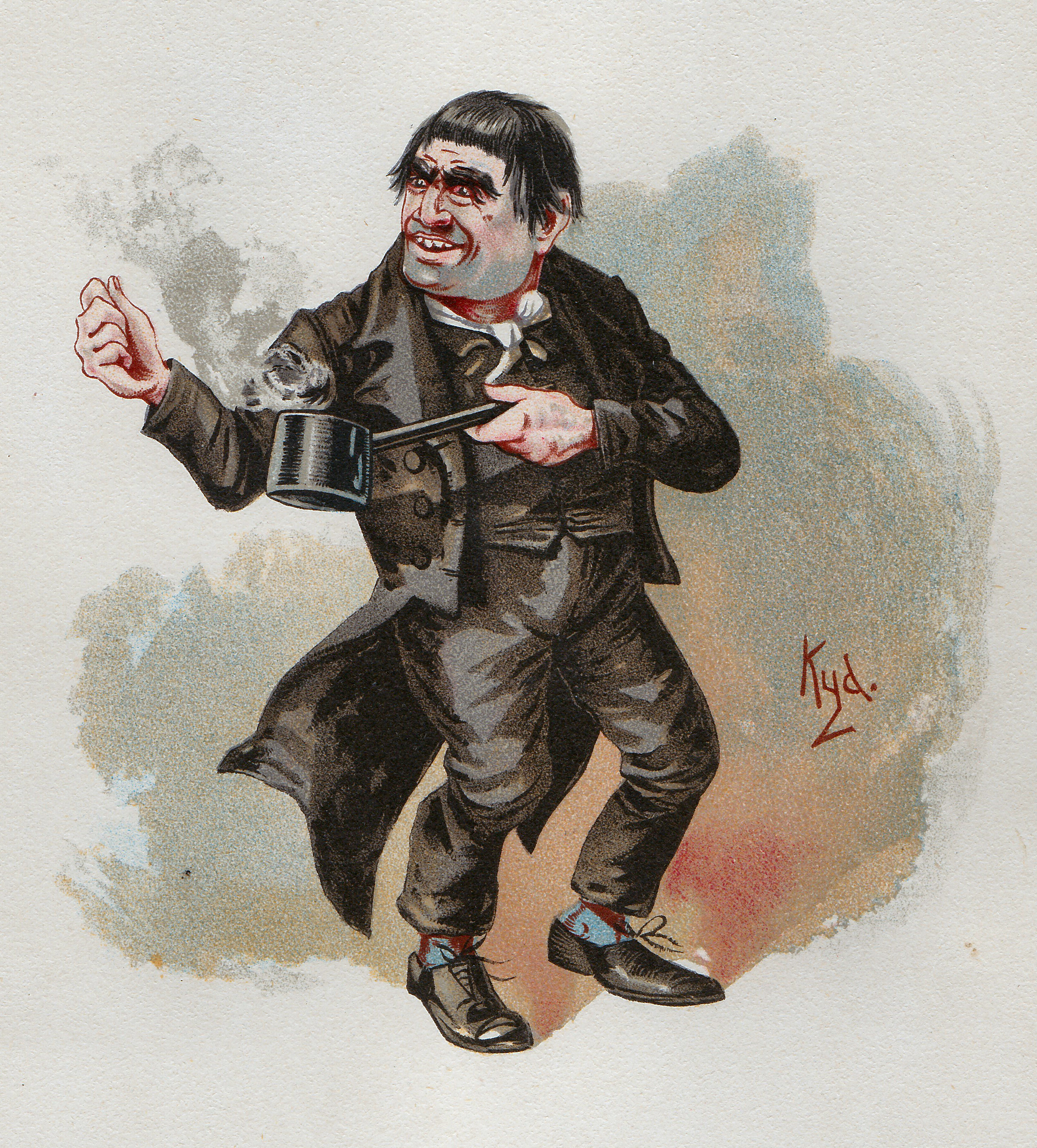
Quilp by 'Kyd' (1889)

Daniel Quilp
The novel's primary villain. He mistreats his wife, Betsy, and manipulates others to his own ends through a false charm he has developed over the years. He lends money to Nell's grandfather and takes possession of the curiosity shop during the old man's illness (which he had caused by revealing his knowledge of the old man's bad gambling habit). He uses sarcasm to belittle those he wishes to control, most notably his wife, and takes a sadistic delight in the suffering of others. He eavesdrops so as to know all of 'the old man's' most private thoughts, and teases him, saying 'you have no secrets from me now'. He also drives a wedge between Kit and the old man (and as a result between Kit and Nell) by pretending it was Kit who told him about the gambling.
Richard "Dick" Swiveller
Frederick Trent's manipulated friend, Sampson Brass's clerk, and the Marchioness' guardian and eventual husband. He delights in quoting and adapting literature to describe his experiences. He is very laid-back and doesn't seem to worry about anything, despite the fact that he owes money to just about everybody. Following Fred's departure from the story, he becomes more independent and eventually is seen as a strong force for good, securing Kit's release from prison and the Marchioness's future. His transformation from an idle and vacant youth to a key helpmate bridges the depiction of the main characters that are either mostly villainous or goodly in nature.
The single gentleman
The estranged younger brother of Nell's grandfather. He leads the search for the travelers after taking lodging in Sampson Brass' rooms and befriending Dick, Kit, and the Garlands.

=== Minor ===
Betsy Quilp
Quilp's mistreated wife. She is mortally afraid of her husband but appears to love him in spite of everything, as she was genuinely worried when he disappeared for a long period.
Sampson Brass
An attorney (what would now be called a solicitor) of the Court of the King's Bench. A grovelling, obsequious man, he is an employee of Mr Quilp, at whose urging he frames Kit for robbery.
Sarah "Sally" Brass
Sampson Brass' obnoxious sister and clerk. She is the real authority in the Brass firm. She is occasionally referred to as a "dragon", and she mistreats the Marchioness. Quilp makes amorous advances towards her, but is rebuffed.
Mrs Jarley
Proprietor of a travelling waxworks show, who takes in Nell and her grandfather out of kindness. However, she only appears briefly.
Frederick Trent
Nell's worthless older brother, who is convinced that his grandfather is secretly wealthy (when in actuality he was the primary cause of the old man's poverty, according to the single gentleman). Initially a major character in the novel and highly influential over Richard Swiveller, he is dropped from the narrative after chapter 23. Briefly mentioned as travelling to Great Britain and the wider world following his disappearance from the story, before being found injured and drowned in the River Seine after the story's conclusion. The character was named after the novelist's younger brother, Frederick Dickens.
Mr Garland
A kind-hearted man, father of Abel Garland and employer of Kit.
The Small Servant
Miss Brass' maidservant. Dick Swiveller befriends her and, finding that she does not know her age or name (Sally Brass simply refers to her as "Little Devil") or parents, nicknames her "The Marchioness" and later gives her the name Sophronia Sphynx. In the original manuscript, it is made explicit that the Marchioness is in fact the illegitimate daughter of Miss Brass, possibly by Quilp, but only a suggestion of this survived in the published edition.
Isaac List and Joe Jowl
Professional gamblers. They are fellow guests at the public house where Nell and her grandfather, unable to get home, pass a stormy night. Nell's grandfather is unable to resist gambling with them and fleeces Nell of what little money she has to this end. That same night, he also robs her of even more money.
Mr Chuckster
The dogsbody of the notary Mr Witherden, who employs Mr Abel Garland. He takes a strong dislike to Kit after Mr Garland overpays Kit for a job and Kit returns to work off the difference; he shows his dislike at every opportunity, calling Kit 'Snobby'.
Mr Marton
A poor schoolmaster. He befriends Nell and later inadvertently meets her and her grandfather on the roads. Nell approaches him to beg for alms, not realising who he is. She faints from a combination of shock and exhaustion, and, realising she is ill, he takes her to an inn and pays for the doctor, and then takes her and her grandfather to live with him in the distant village where he has been appointed parish clerk.
Thomas Codlin
Proprietor of a travelling Punch and Judy show.
Mr Harris ('Short Trotters')
Puppeteer of Thomas Codlin's Punch and Judy show.
Barbara
The maidservant of Mr and Mrs Garland and future wife of Kit.
The Bachelor
Brother of Mr Garland. Lives in the village where Nell and her grandfather end their journey, and unknowingly alerts his brother to their presence through a letter.
Mrs Jiniwin
Mrs Quilp's mother and Quilp's mother-in-law. She resents Quilp for the way he treats her daughter, but is too afraid to stand up to him.

== Literary significance and criticism ==
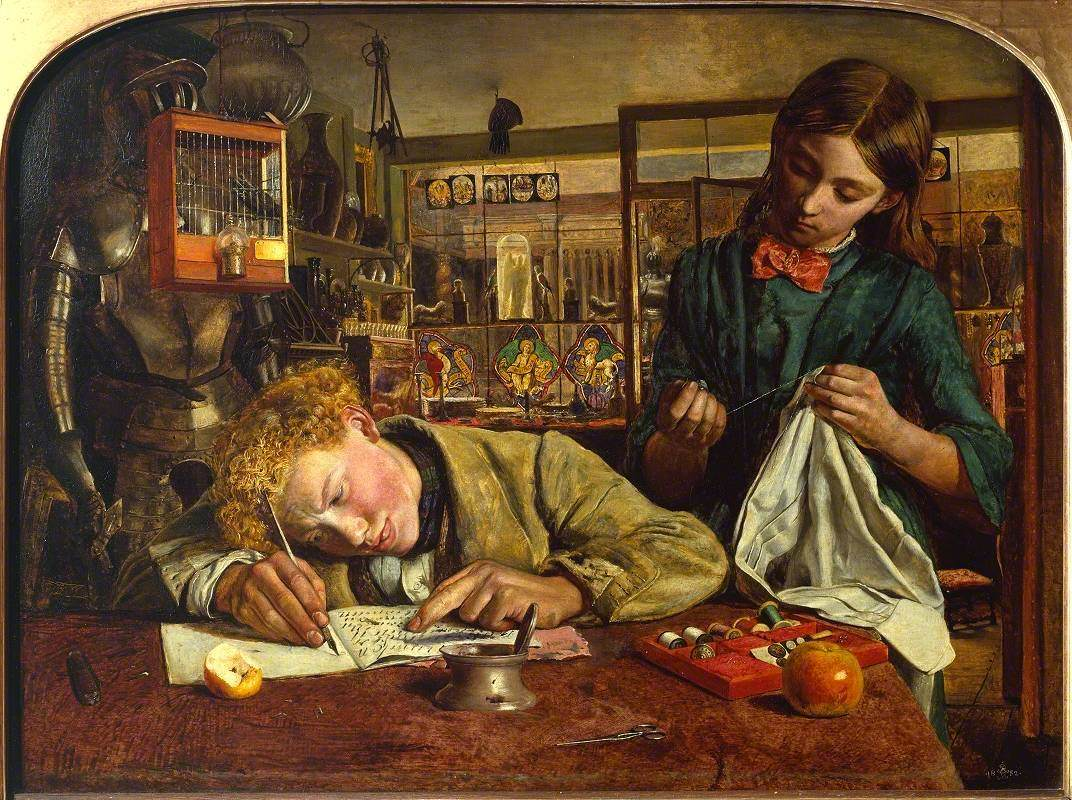
Kit's Writing Lesson by Robert Braithwaite Martineau, 1852

Probably the most widely repeated criticism of Dickens is the remark reputedly made by Oscar Wilde that "one must have a heart of stone to read the death of little Nell without laughing." The scene of Nell's death is not part of the text. Of a similar opinion was the poet Algernon Swinburne, who commented that "a child whom nothing can ever irritate, whom nothing can even baffle, whom nothing can ever misguide, whom nothing can ever delude, and whom nothing can ever dismay, is a monster as inhuman as a baby with two heads".

The Irish leader Daniel O'Connell famously burst into tears at the finale, and threw the book out of the window of the train in which he was travelling.

The excitement surrounding the conclusion of the series was unprecedented. (Stories that Dickens fans stormed the docks in New York City, eager for the latest instalment of the novel, or news of it, are apocryphal.) In 2007, many newspapers claimed that the excitement at the release of the last instalment of The Old Curiosity Shop was the only historical comparison that could be made to the excitement at the release of the last Harry Potter novel, Harry Potter and the Deathly Hallows.

The Norwegian author Ingeborg Refling Hagen is said to have buried a copy of the book in her youth, stating that nobody deserved to read about Nell, because nobody would ever understand her pain. She compared herself to Nell, because of her miserable circumstances.

== Allusions to actual history and geography ==
=== The Old Curiosity Shop ===
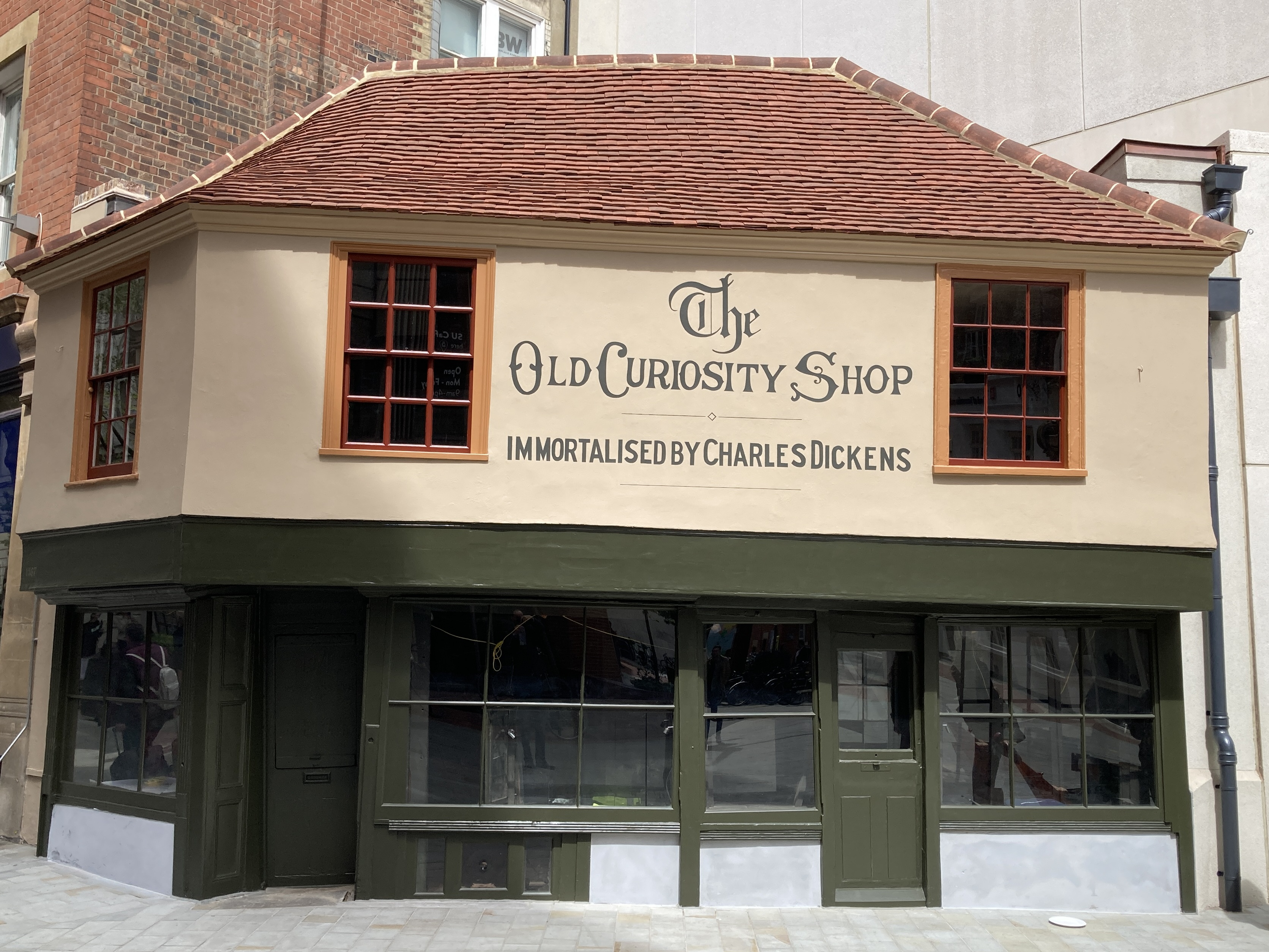
The Old Curiosity Shop, London

A shop named "The Old Curiosity Shop" can be found at 13–14 Portsmouth Street, Holborn, London, WC2A 2ES, and is now owned by the London School of Economics. The building dates back to the sixteenth century (1567) in an area known as Clare Market, but the shop name was added after the novel was released, as it was thought to be the inspiration for Dickens's description of the antique shop. At one time it functioned as a dairy on an estate given by King Charles II to one of his many mistresses. It was built using timber from old ships, and survived the bombs of World War II. The shop was restored in 2023 to repair structural problems and will be rented out again as a shop.

=== The Route They Took ===
- Nell and her grandfather meet Codlin and Short in a churchyard in Aylesbury.
- The horse races where Nell and her grandfather go with the show people are at Banbury.
- The village where they first meet the schoolmaster is Warmington, Warwickshire.
- They meet Mrs. Jarley near the village of Gaydon, Warwickshire.
- The town where they work at Jarley's Waxworks is Warwick.
- The heavily industrialised town where Nell spends the night by the furnace is Birmingham (after they have travelled on the Warwick and Birmingham Canal).
- The town in which Nell faints and is rescued by the school master is Wolverhampton in the Black Country.
- The village where they finally find peace and rest and where Nell dies is Tong, Shropshire.

Other real locations used in the novel include London Bridge, Bevis Marks, Finchley, and Minster-on-Sea.

It is reported by local Coventry historian David McGrory that Charles Dickens used Coventry's Whitefriars gatehouse in The Old Curiosity Shop. This gatehouse building still exists in Much Park Street.

== Adaptations ==
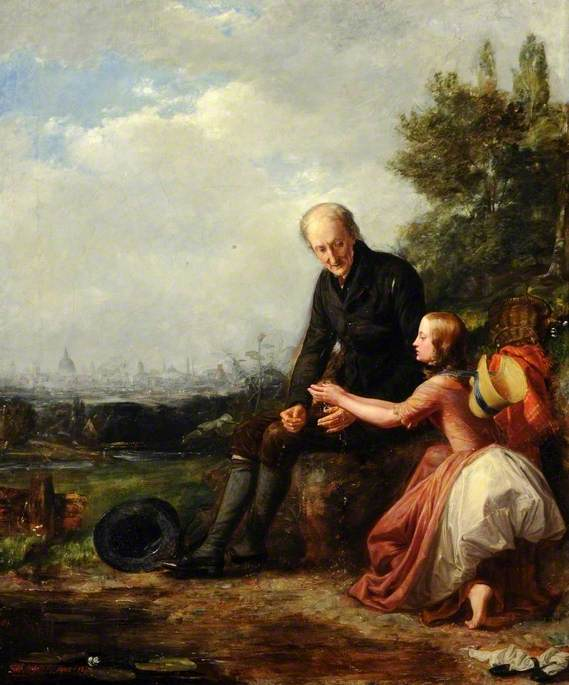
Little Nell and Her Grandfather by William Holman Hunt, 1845

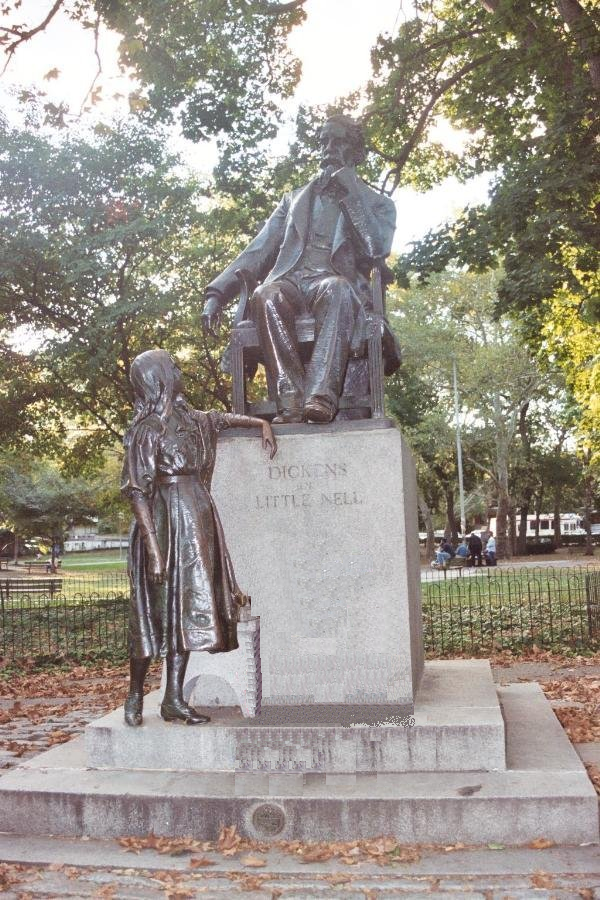
Dickens and Little Nell, an 1890 statue by Francis Edwin Elwell exhibited in Philadelphia

- Little Nell and the Marchioness (1866), a play by John Brougham created for Lotta Crabtree. Crabtree performed for years as Nell in this play.
- Little Nell and the Marchioness (1900), a play by Harry P. Mawson staged on Broadway at the Herald Square Theatre.
- There were several silent film adaptations of the novel including two directed by Thomas Bentley:
  - The Old Curiosity Shop (1913)
  - The Old Curiosity Shop (1921)
- Nelly, an opera based on the novel, by Italian composer Lamberto Landi, was composed in 1916; it premiered in Lucca in 1947.
- The first talkie version was a 1934 British film starring Hay Petrie as Quilp.
- The novel was serialised for television by the BBC in 1962, starring Patrick Troughton as Quilp. No recordings of this production are known to exist.
- A British musical version of The Old Curiosity Shop (titled Mr. Quilp in the United States) was released in 1975. The filmmakers were hoping to cash in on the recent success of Oliver!, which was also based on a Dickens classic, but the film was notably unsuccessful.
- An anime adaptation, Sasurai no Shoujo Nell (Wandering Girl Nell), aired in Japan from 1979 to 1980.
- In 1979, a nine-part miniseries, featuring Natalie Ogle as Nell and Trevor Peacock as Quilp, was created by the BBC and later released on DVD. There was no Frederick character and the story ends with the grandfather mourning at Nell's grave.
- In 1984, an animated version was produced by Burbank Films in Australia.
- In 1995, Tom Courtenay and Peter Ustinov starred in a Disney made-for-television film adaptation as Quilp and the grandfather, with Sally Walsh as Nell.
- A BBC Radio 4 adaptation was broadcast in 1998. The production starred Tom Courtenay as Quilp, Denis Quilley, Michael Maloney and Teresa Gallagher.
- A second adaptation for BBC Radio 4, first broadcast in 2002-03, was narrated by Alex Jennings, with Emily Chenery (Nell), Phil Daniels (Quilp), Daniel Bliss (Kit), Trevor Peacock (grandfather), Clive Swift, Anna Massey and Julia McKenzie.
- A television film adaptation was produced by ITV, broadcast in the UK on 26 December 2007, and repeated on 14 December 2008.
- Little Nell is featured in the Philadelphia, Pennsylvania, sculptural group Dickens and Little Nell (1890).
- Nell and her grandfather are featured prominently in the BBC's 2015 Christmas drama Dickensian, which brings together many of Dickens's iconic characters in one story.
- Russell T. Davies has expressed interest in adapting the novel for television.

== Major editions ==
- 1840–1841, UK, Chapman and Hall, Pub date (88 weekly parts) April 1840 to November 1841, Serial as part of Master Humphrey's Clock
- 1841, UK, Chapman and Hall (ISBN not used), Pub date ? ? 1841, hardback (first edition)
- 1870, UK, Chapman and Hall (ISBN not used), Hardback
- 1904, NY, Thomas Y. Crowell (ISBN not used), Pub date ? ? 1904, leatherbound
- 1972, UK, Penguin English Library ISBN 0-14-005436-7, with extensive notes; pub date ? 1972, reprinted six times
- 1995, USA, Everyman's Library ISBN 0-460-87600-7, Pub date ? ? 1995, paperback
- 1997, UK, Clarendon Press (Oxford University Press) ISBN 0-19-812493-7, Pub date 13 November 1997, hardback. This is considered the definitive edition of the book.
- 2001, UK, Penguin Books Ltd ISBN 0-14-043742-8, Pub date 25 January 2001, paperback (Penguin Classic)
