= Hay Petrie =

Scottish actor (1895–1948)

- Hay Petrie in The Red Shoes (1948)
- Born: 16 July 1895; Dundee, Scotland, United Kingdom
- Died: 30 July 1948 (aged 53); Fulham, England, United Kingdom
- Occupation: Actor
- Years active: 1930–1948 (film)

David Hay Petrie (16 July 1895 – 30 July 1948) was a Scottish actor noted for playing eccentric characters, among them Quilp in The Old Curiosity Shop (1934), the McLaggen in The Ghost Goes West (1935) and Uncle Pumblechook in Great Expectations (1946).

Hay Petrie was born in Dundee, Angus, Scotland, the son of Jessie and David Mathew Petrie, a decorator. He went to Harris Academy and later attended St Andrew's University, where he first discovered the stage. In 1915, he joined the Royal Scots (Lothian Regiment) as a second lieutenant.

After the war, he studied with Rosina Filippi, joining the Old Vic Company appearing as "Starveling" in A Midsummer Night's Dream in 1920. In 1924 Albert de Courville brought Hay Petrie into vaudeville with The Looking Glass, in which he sang "Oh Shakespeare you're the best of all but you can't fill the fourteen shilling stall". His first film part was Many Waters in 1931. In 1928 he married Muriel Eleanor Gwendolen Stevens (1904-). During World War II he was an ARP warden.

Hay Petrie struggled with alcoholism, but was much loved by audiences and players. He was never more at home than when he was playing parts from the classical theatre, and for many he was the Shakespearean Clown of the early 1920s.

He died in London in July 1948, aged 53.

== Filmography ==
- Suspense (1930) as Scruffy (film debut)
- Night Birds (1931) as Scotty
- Many Waters (1931) as Director
- Carmen (1931) as Remenado
- Help Yourself (1932) as Sam Short
- The Lucky Number (1932) as The Photographer
- The Private Life of Henry VIII (1933) as The King's Barber (uncredited)
- The Wandering Jew (1933) as Palermo Merchant (uncredited)
- Song of the Plough (1933) as Farmhand
- Crime on the Hill (1933) as Jevons
- Red Wagon (1933) as Minor Role (uncredited)
- Matinee Idol (1933) as Mr. Clappit
- Colonel Blood (1934) as Mr. Edwards
- The Queen's Affair (1934) as Revolutionary
- Nell Gwynn (1934) as French Ambassador (uncredited)
- The Private Life of Don Juan (1934) as Golden Pheasant Manager (uncredited)
- Blind Justice (1934) as Harry
- The Old Curiosity Shop (1934) as Quilp
- Peg of Old Drury (1935) as Mr. Rich
- The Loves of Madame Dubarry (1935) as Cascal
- Koenigsmark (1935) as Professor (uncredited)
- Moscow Nights (1935) as Spy
- The Ghost Goes West (1935) as The McLaggen
- Invitation to the Waltz (1935) as Periteau
- Forget Me Not (1936) as New York Theatre Manager
- Men of Yesterday (1936)
- The House of the Spaniard (1936) as Orlando
- Hearts of Humanity (1936) as Alf Hooper
- Rembrandt (1936) as Jeweller (uncredited)
- Treachery on the High Seas (1936) as Brainie
- Conquest of the Air (1936) as Tiberius Cavallo
- Secret Lives (1937) as Robert Pigeon
- Knight Without Armour (1937) as Station Master
- The Last Barricade (1938) as Captain MacTavish
- Keep Smiling (1938) as Jack
- A Spot of Bother (1938) as McTavish the Golf Club Official (uncredited)
- Q Planes (1939) as Stage Door Keeper
- Trunk Crime (1939) as Old Dan
- The Four Feathers (1939) as Mahdi Interpreter (uncredited)
- Jamaica Inn (1939) as Sam - Sir Humphrey's Groom
- The Spy in Black (1939) as Engineer
- Inquest (1939) as Norman Neale K.C.
- 21 Days (1940) as Evan
- Contraband (1940) as Axel Skold/Erik Skold
- Crimes at the Dark House (1940) as Dr. Isidor Fosco
- Spy for a Day (1940) as Mr. Britt.
- Pastor Hall (1940) as Nazi Pastor
- Ten Days in Paris (1940) as Benoit
- Convoy (1940) as Minesweeper Skipper
- The Thief of Bagdad (1940) as Astrologer
- Freedom Radio (1941) as Sebastian
- The Ghost of St. Michael's (1941) as Procurator Fiscal
- Quiet Wedding (1941) as Railway Porter (uncredited)
- Spellbound (AKA ' Passing Clouds ') 1941) as Mr. Cathcart
- Turned Out Nice Again (1941) as Drunk (uncredited)
- Cottage to Let (1941) as Dr. Truscott
- Rush Hour (1941, Short) as Bus Conductor (uncredited)
- This Was Paris (1942) as Popinard, Amusement Park Owner
- One of Our Aircraft Is Missing (1942) as The Burgomaster
- Hard Steel (1942) as Mr. Kissack
- They Flew Alone (1942) as Old General
- Those Kids from Town (1942) as Ted Roberts
- Sabotage at Sea (1942) as Talkative sailor at table
- The Great Mr. Handel (1942) as Phineas
- Escape to Danger (1943) (uncredited)
- Schweik's New Adventures (1943) as Gestapo man at inn
- They Met in the Dark (1943) as Waiter (uncredited)
- The Shipbuilders (1943) as Worker in Pagan's Office (uncredited)
- Battle for Music (1943) as Official Receiver
- On Approval (1944) as Hotelkeeper
- A Canterbury Tale (1944) as Woodcock
- Kiss the Bride Goodbye (1945) as Fraser
- For You Alone (1945) as Sir Henry Markham (uncredited)
- Waltz Time (1945) as Minister of War
- The Voice Within (1946) as Fair Owner
- Night Boat to Dublin (1946) as Station Master
- Under New Management (1946) as The Bridegroom
- The Laughing Lady (1946) as Tom
- Great Expectations (1946) as Uncle Pumblechook
- The Red Shoes (1948) as Boisson
- The Dark Road (1948)
- The Fallen Idol (1948) as Clock Winder
- Noose (1948) as Barber
- The Guinea Pig (1948) as Peck
- The Monkey's Paw (1948) as Grimshaw, Curio Shopkeeper
- The Queen of Spades (1949) as Herman's servant (final film)
