= Mister Quilp =

1975 British film by Michael Tuchner

- U.S. theatrical poster
- Directed by: Michael Tuchner
- Written by: Irene Kamp; Louis Kamp
- Based on: The Old Curiosity Shop by Charles Dickens
- Produced by: Helen M. Strauss
- Starring: Anthony Newley; David Hemmings
- Cinematography: Christopher Challis
- Edited by: John Jympson
- Music by: Elmer Bernstein
- Production company: Reader's Digest Films Limited
- Distributed by: EMI Distribution
- Release date: 20 November 1975
- Running time: 118 minutes
- Country: United Kingdom
- Language: English

Mister Quilp (also known as The Old Curiosity Shop) is a 1975 British musical film directed by Michael Tuchner and starring Anthony Newley, David Hemmings and Jill Bennett. It is based on the 1841 novel The Old Curiosity Shop by Charles Dickens.

== Main cast ==
- Anthony Newley as Daniel Quilp
- David Hemmings as Richard Swiveller
- Jill Bennett as Sally Brass
- Sarah-Jane Varley as Little Nell
- Michael Hordern as grandfather / Edward Trent
- David Warner as Sampson Brass
- Yvonne Antrobus as Betsy Quilp
- Sue Barbour as stiltdancer
- David Battley as Codlin
- Windsor Davies as George, Mrs. Jarley's assistant.
- Philip Davis as Tom Scott
- Peter Duncan as Kit Nubbles
- Brian Glover as furnaceman
- Chris Greener as Giant
- Rosalind Knight as Mrs. George
- Ronald Lacey as Harris
- Bryan Pringle as Mr. Garland
- Paul Rogers as single gent / Henry Trent
- Maxwell Shaw as Isaac List
- Norman Warwick as Vuffin
- Mona Washbourne as Mrs. Jarley
- Malcolm Weaver as acrobat
- Sarah Webb as Duchess

== Release ==
The film was one of several "Family Classics" made into modern musical films by Reader's Digest. Mr. Quilp was theatrically distributed by EMI Films in the United Kingdom and by Avco Embassy Pictures in the USA.

=== Home media ===
In the VHS and Beta formats, it was released by Magnetic Video under the title The Old Curiosity Shop, though this release was heavily edited down by roughly 30 minutes. Viewers in the UK have reported seeing it played on television in the 1980s. To date, the film has never been officially released on DVD.

== Critical reception ==
The Monthly Film Bulletin wrote: "Although the mixture of song, dance and Dickens proved potent enough in Oliver! [1968], the results in this Reader's Digest adaptation of The Old Curiosity Shop are distinctly flat and unappetising. Things bode ill from the very start, when Swiveller and Nell meet in a supposedly bustling London street which refuses to bustle no matter how often Michael Tuchner changes camera positions. Nothing gels: the studio set seems too spotless (the pavements and gutters are without a scrap of garbage or litter), the costumes seem fresh off the peg from the Old Dickensian Costume Shop, and the songs match the choreography in their clumsiness and lameness ("I may be simple-hearted but I think the world is grand" is a fair sample of the lyric). The acting doesn't improve matters: Anthony Newley consistently goes over the top as Quilp, his black eyebrows hurtling up and down, just about keeping pace with his darting arms and legs; and Sarah-Jane Varley's Nell becomes unpalatably winsome long before she catches cold and goes into her decline. In the final stretches, the difficulties of adapting the heavily episodic novel loom ridiculously large: Swiveller drops out of sight completely, Quilp's demise is handled too perfunctorily to have any effect, and the character of Kit, after long neglect, suddenly comes to the forefront. In a coda we see him ensconced as the new owner of the Curiosity Shop, walking around with his memories and singing – a scene so banal and pathetic that it might have made Dickens himself queasy."

The Radio Times Guide to Films gave the film 2/5 stars, writing: "Anthony Newley plays the mean-spirited, hunchbacked money-lender Quilp in this film version of Charles Dickens's The Old Curiosity Shop. The star also composed the songs in the manner of Lionel Bart's Oliver!. This is principally a sanitised, Americanised, family-orientated affair that nevertheless preserves some of the darker elements of the original. The performances, particularly Newley's, put the emphasis on grotesquerie."

British film critic Leslie Halliwell said: "The novel, with its villainous lead, is a curious choice for musicalizing, and in this treatment falls desperately flat, with no sparkle of imagination visible anywhere."

Critic Roger Ebert gave the film a mixed review, praising the music and Newley's performance, but criticising the decision to centre the film around the titular evil money-lender and failing to make the story compelling enough to hold interest.
