= Geoff Breton =

British actor

Geoffrey Breton (born 10 September 1984, Kingston upon Thames) is an English actor. He graduated from the Drama Centre London in 2006.

== Select credits ==
=== Television ===
- Blue Murder (2003–09)
- The Rotters' Club (2005)
- The Old Curiosity Shop (2007)
- Chemical Wedding (2008)
- The Diary of Anne Frank (2008)
- Lewis (2009)
- Doctors (2010)
- Hollyoaks Later (2011)
- Inspector George Gently (2017)
- The Crown (2020)
- The Good Ship Murder (2023–2026)

=== Theatre ===
- Amy's View (2006)

=== Audio drama ===
- Absolution (2007)

=== Video games ===
- "Fable: the Journey"
- "The Witcher 3: The Wild Hunt"
- "Assassin's Creed: Valhalla"
- "Total War: Warhammer III"
