= The Old Curiosity Shop (1934 film) =

- Directed by: Thomas Bentley
- Written by: Charles Dickens (novel); Ralph Neale; Margaret Kennedy
- Produced by: Walter C. Mycroft
- Starring: Elaine Benson; Ben Webster; Hay Petrie; Polly Ward
- Cinematography: Claude Friese-Greene
- Edited by: Leslie Norman
- Music by: Herman Finck
- Production company: British International Pictures
- Distributed by: Wardour Films; First Division Pictures (US)
- Release date: 14 December 1934
- Running time: 105 minutes
- Country: United Kingdom
- Language: English

The Old Curiosity Shop is a 1934 British drama film directed by Thomas Bentley and starring Elaine Benson, Ben Webster and Hay Petrie. It is an adaptation of Charles Dickens' 1841 novel The Old Curiosity Shop.

== Production ==
The film was produced by British International Pictures, one of the two most prominent British film studios of the time, at its base at Elstree Studios. Bentley was a well-established director who worked on several of the company's presigous historical films during the decade. He had previously directed a number of Dickens adaptations during the silent era, but this was his only Dickens talkie. The film sought to achieve a "painterly" effect in its interpretation of the original work. The recreation of the grotesque elements of Dickens' novel has led to it being described as an "expressionist nightmare".

== Cast ==
- Elaine Benson as Nell
- Ben Webster as The Grandfather
- Hay Petrie as Quilp
- Beatrix Thomson as Quilp's Wife
- Gibb McLaughlin as Sampson Brass
- Lily Long as Sally Brass
- Reginald Purdell as Dick Swiveller
- Polly Ward as The Marchioness
- James Harcourt as The Single Gentleman
- J. Fisher White as The Schoolmaster
- Dick Tubb as Codin
- Roddy Hughes as Short
- Amy Veness as Mrs. Jarley
- Peter Penrose as Kit
- Vic Filmer as Tom Scott

== Bibliography ==
- Harper, Sue. Picturing the Past: The Rise and Fall of the British Costume Film. British Film Institute, 1994.
