= Quilp =

One of the main antagonists in the novel The Old Curiosity Shop by Charles Dickens

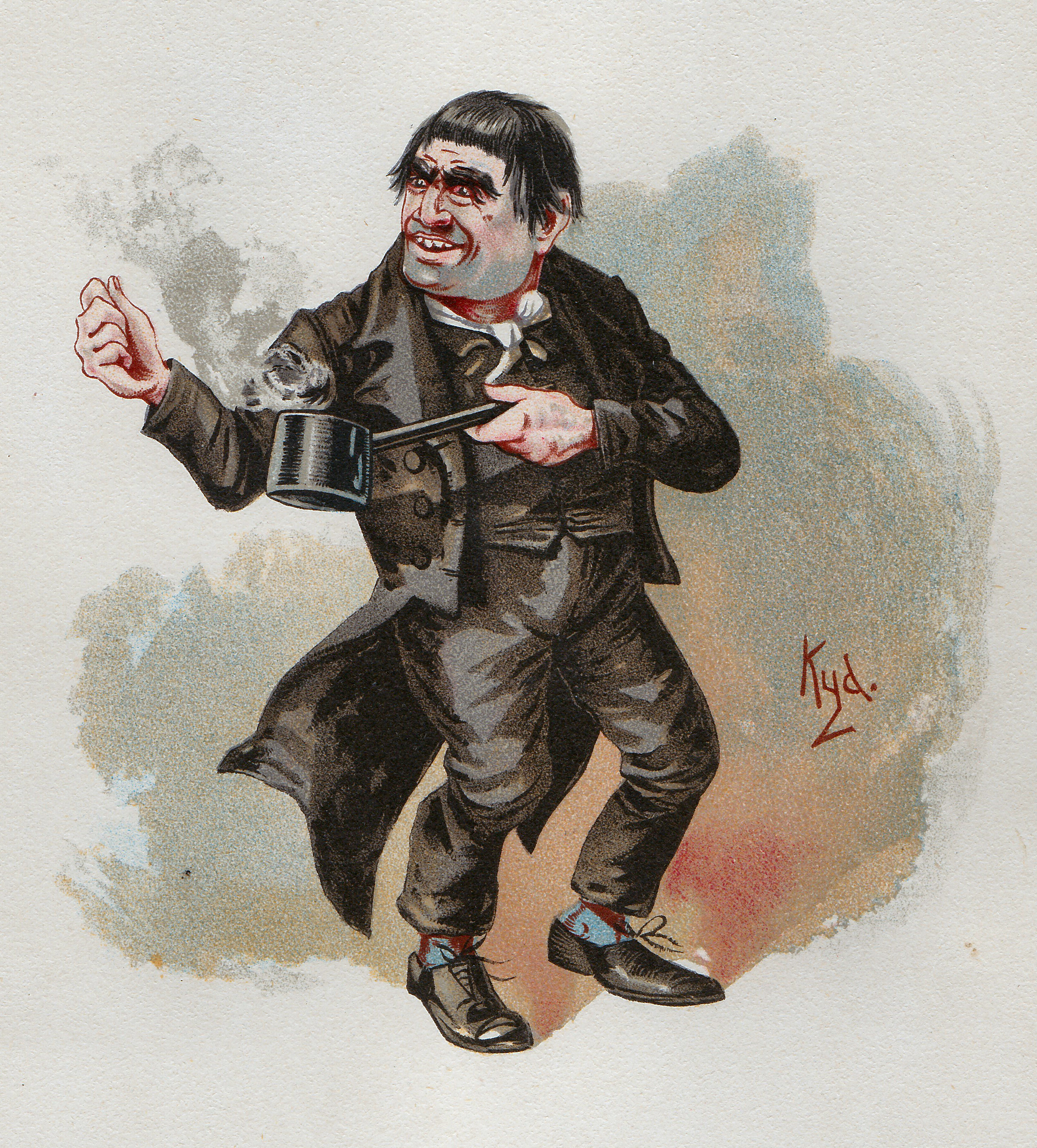
Daniel Quilp by 'Kyd' (1889)

Daniel Quilp is one of the main antagonists in the novel The Old Curiosity Shop by Charles Dickens, written in 1840. Quilp is a vicious, ill-tempered and grotesque dwarf and is the villain of the story. Quilp is as near as Dickens ever came to creating a monster. Actors who have portrayed him include Hay Petrie, Anthony Newley, Patrick Troughton, Trevor Peacock, and Toby Jones.

== Description ==
Dickens describes Quilp as "so low in stature as to be quite a dwarf, though his head and face were large enough for a giant. His black eyes were restless, sly and cunning, his mouth and chin, bristly with the stubble of a coarse hard beard; and his complexion was one of that kind which never looks clean or wholesome. But what added most to the grotesque expression of his face, was a ghastly smile, which appearing to be the mere result of habit and to have no connection with any mirthful or complacent feeling, constantly revealed the few discoloured fangs that were yet scattered in his mouth, and gave him the aspect of a panting dog... he ate hard eggs, shell and all, devoured gigantic prawns with the heads and tails on... drank boiling tea without winking, bit his fork and spoon till they bent again, and in short performed so many horrifying and uncommon acts that the women were nearly frightened out of their wits, and began to doubt if he were really a human creature." He is the most repulsive of all Dickens' grotesque characters, with no redeeming features.

== Quilp and Little Nell ==
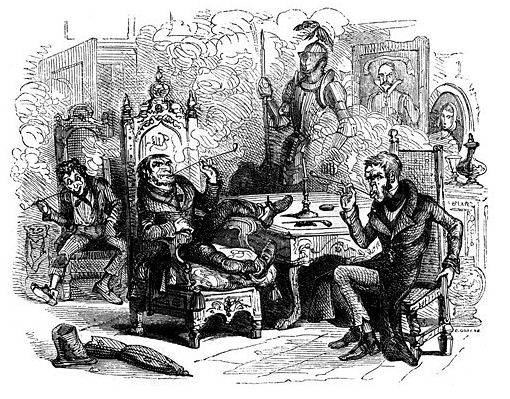
Quilp plots with Sampson Brass, illustration by 'Phiz' for The Old Curiosity Shop (1840)

Daniel Quilp lives in Tower Hill on the north side of the River Thames; he has a wharf on the south side of the river from where he conducts his business as a ship breaker and usurer. He takes great pleasure in tormenting his pretty wife, Mrs. Betsy Quilp, as well as Little Nell, her grandfather, Sampson Brass and Kit Nubbles.

Quilp lusts after Little Nell and, hoping eventually to marry her after disposing of his wife, he lends money to her gambler grandfather. When the grandfather gambles the money away, hoping to provide for Nell's future, Quilp seizes The Old Curiosity Shop, forcing Nell and her grandfather to flee London to escape from Quilp, who hunts the couple as they journey across the country.

Eventually Quilp is hunted by the police for his crimes and, lost in the fog, he accidentally drowns in the Thames at his wharf. On Quilp's death his wife inherits his property and when she remarries, her new husband is the opposite of Quilp in every way.

== Media portrayals ==
Quilp has been played by:

=== Film ===
- E. Felton in The Old Curiosity Shop (1914).
- Pino Conti in The Old Curiosity Shop (1921).
- Hay Petrie in The Old Curiosity Shop (1934)
- Anthony Newley in Mister Quilp (1975).

=== Television ===
- Patrick Troughton in the BBC TV 11-episode miniseries The Old Curiosity Shop (1962).
- Trevor Peacock in the BBC miniseries The Old Curiosity Shop (1979).
- Tom Courtenay starred as Quilp in a Disney made-for-television film (1995).
- Toby Jones in the ITV TV film The Old Curiosity Shop (2007).

=== Radio ===
- Phil Daniels played Quilp in an adaptation for BBC Radio 4, first broadcast in 1990.
- Tom Courtenay played Quilp in a second BBC Radio 4 adaptation broadcast in 1998.

== See also ==
- Quilp Rock an island in Antarctica named after the character.
