= Joseph Clayton Clark =

British artist (1857–1937)

'Kyd' self-portrait as the Joker for a set of Charles Dickens The Pickwick Papers playing cards (1931)

Joseph Clayton Clark (1857 – 8 August 1937), who worked under the pseudonym "Kyd", was a British artist best known for his illustrations of characters from the novels of Charles Dickens. The artwork was published in magazines or sold as watercolor paintings, rather than included in an edition of the novels.

== Early life and family life ==
He was born in Peel on the Isle of Man in 1857, the son of Lauris and Eliza Clark.

In 1889 he married Agnes Roberts (born 1872), and their children were: David (born 1891), Dora (born 1891), Constance (born 1893), Grace (born 1895), Josephine (born 1897), Rose (born 1898), Joseph Cecil (1900–1989), Cecil William (1900–1989), Alice Ivy (1906–1927), and Joseph Clayton Jr. (born 1911). Around 1892, Clark moved with his family to Chichester in West Sussex.

== Career ==
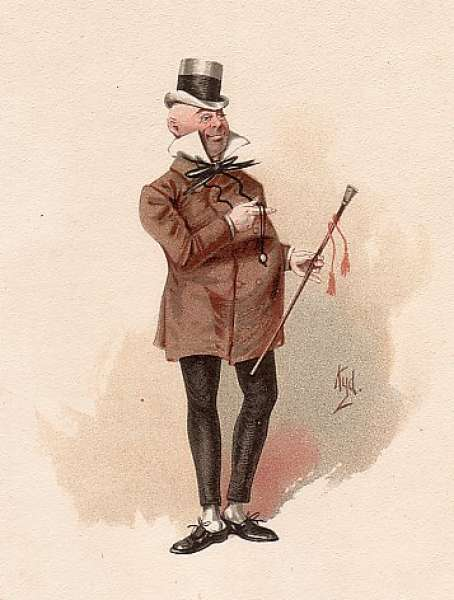
Wilkins Micawber from David Copperfield

Clark had many occupations during his lifetime, including designer of cigarette cards and postcards, and as a fore-edge painter principally specializing in characters from the works of Charles Dickens. He worked for Punch for only one day and then as a freelance artist until 1900.

Clark's illustrations from Dickens first appeared in 1887 in Fleet Street Magazine, with two published collections appearing shortly after as The Characters of Charles Dickens (1889) and Some Well Known Characters from the Works of Charles Dickens (1892). Kyd's representations from the works of Dickens owe much to the original illustrations of Hablot Knight Browne ('Phiz') and Robert Seymour (the first illustrator of The Pickwick Papers, one of Clark's most popular themes), while the modelling of the characters seems to be based on Phiz's later designs from the 1870s. Early in the twentieth century five sets of postcards based on his Dickens drawings were published, as well as seven sets of non-Dickensian comic cards.

From 1927 Clark earned his living from watercolor sketches, mainly of Dickens' characters, which he sold to and through the London book trade. Frederic G. Kitton referred to Clark in his book Dickens and His Illustrators (1890), by which time Clark's watercolors were already being bought by major Dickens collectors. The auction of the Dickens collection of F W Cosens FSA of Clapham Park, held at Christie's on 17 May 1890, sold a collection of 241 of Clark's Dickens watercolors, and Tom Wilson, at the time the foremost collector of Dickens, owned 331 of Clark's drawings.

"As a character 'Kyd' emulated those of Dickens and his own illustrations – slightly larger than life. In his style and dress he was mildly flamboyant for the period. He seldom varied his attire from a grey suit, spats, homburg hat, gloves and was never without a carnation or substitute flower in his button hole."

Apart from his Dickens work, "Kyd" also illustrated humorous series such as "Some Typical Newspaper Readers" (c.1900), "The Book and Its Reader", and "London Types". He also illustrated a series of 50 smokers for Gallaher Ltd.; this series was issued as a set of cigarette cards entitled "Votaries of the Weed" in 1916.

In 1910 the British Museum acquired a collection of 598 drawings and paintings of Clark's Dickens illustrations, and the Victoria and Albert Museum, Charles Dickens Museum and the University of Texas at Austin each also have significant collections of Clark's Dickens illustrations.

== Death ==
Joseph Clayton Clark died in the New End Hospital in Hampstead in London in August 1937.

== Honored as UK stamp art ==
Six of his illustrations were issued as stamps by the Royal Mail in 2012 to mark the 200th anniversary of the birth of Charles Dickens.

== Gallery ==
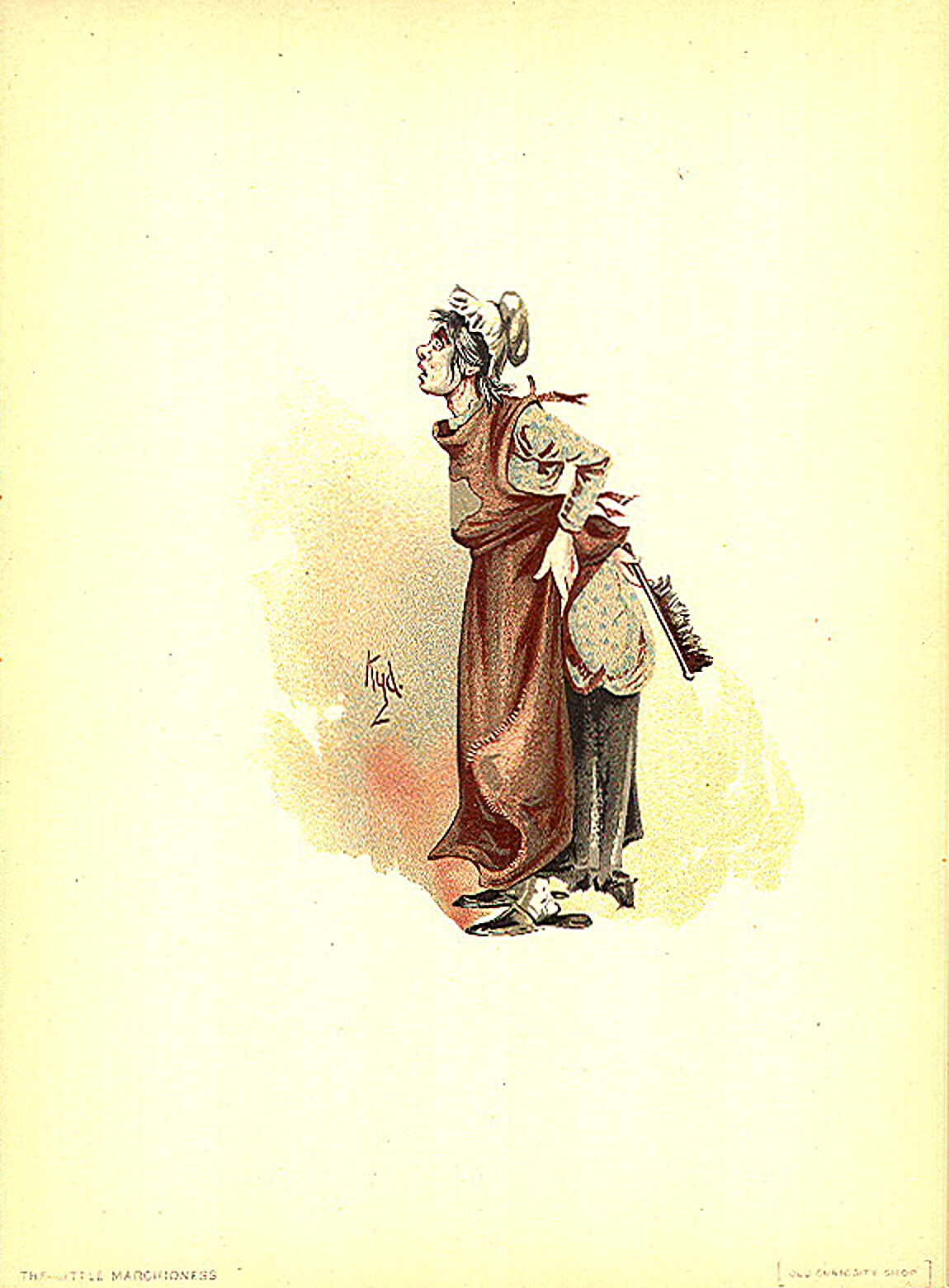
The Marchioness from The Old Curiosity Shop

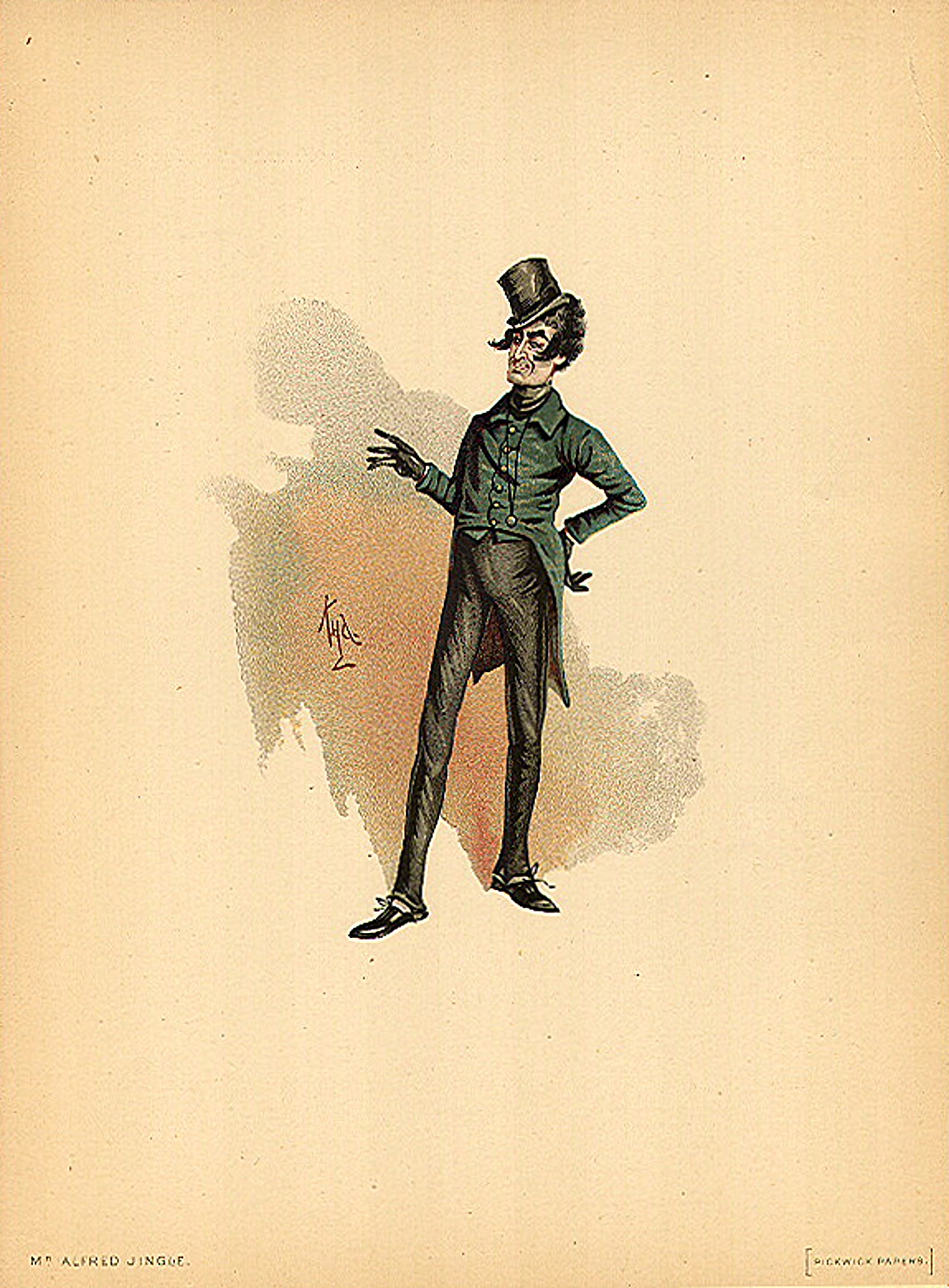
Mr Jingle from The Pickwick Papers

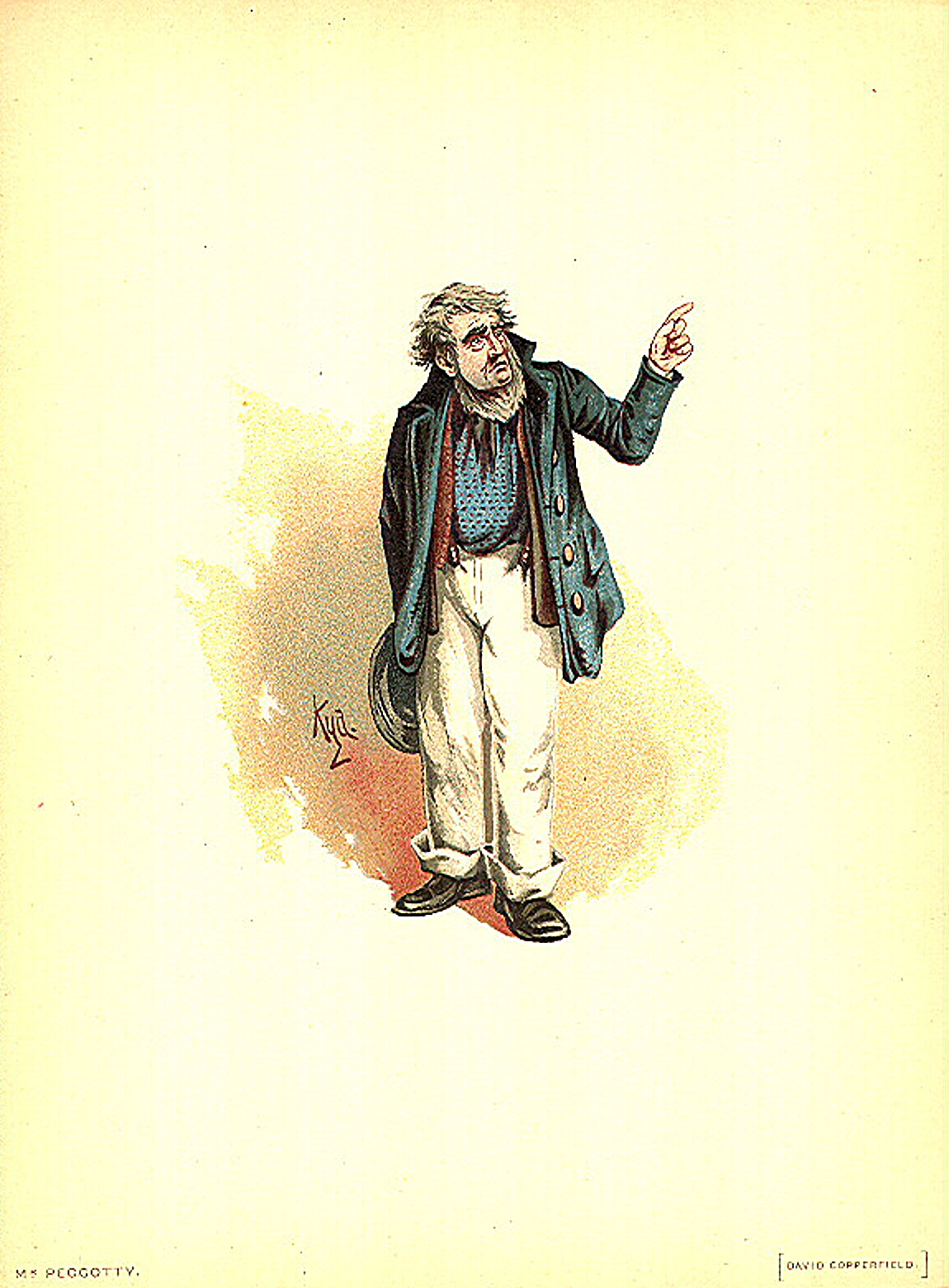
Daniel Peggotty from David Copperfield

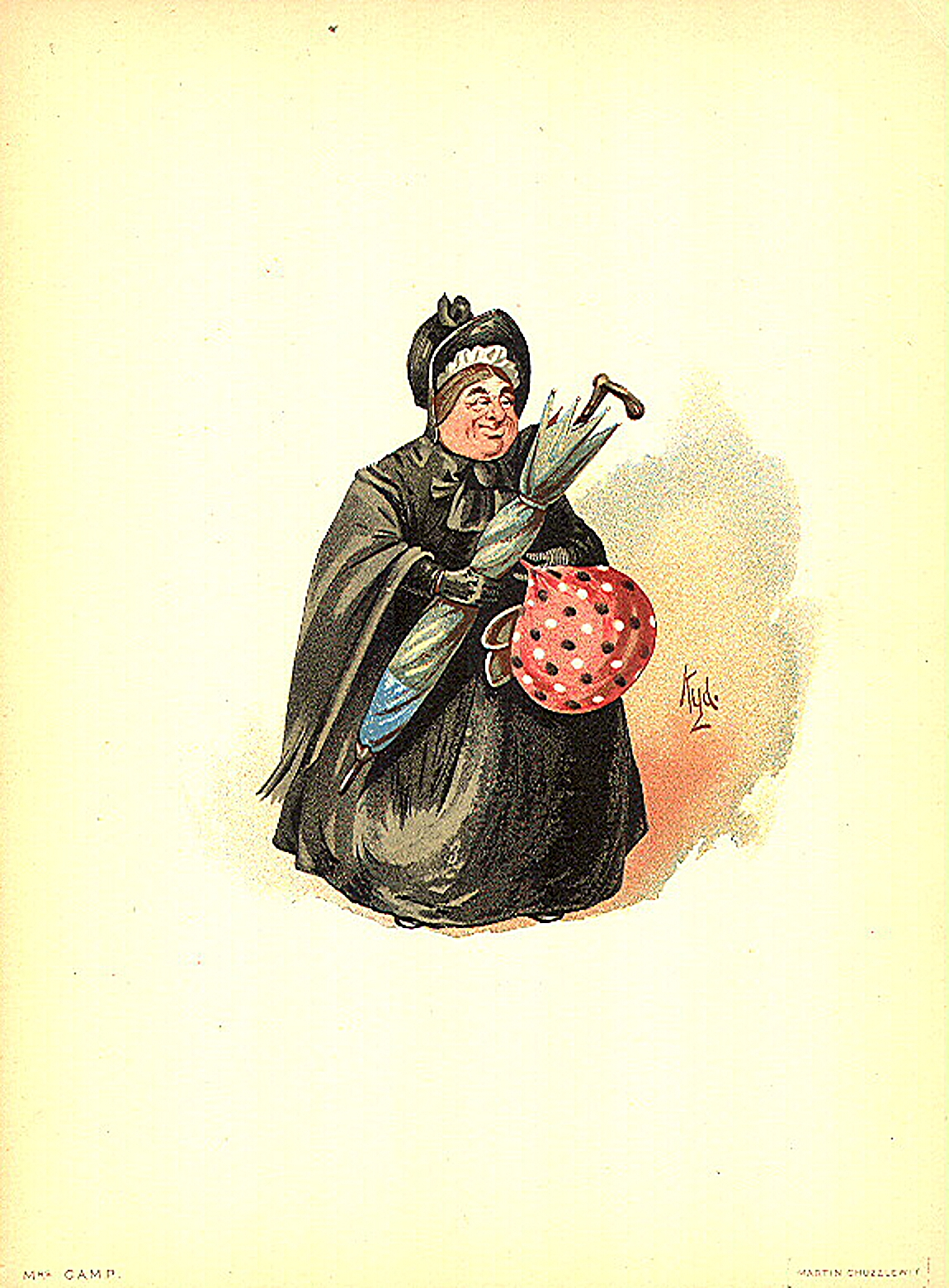
Sairey Gamp from Martin Chuzzlewit

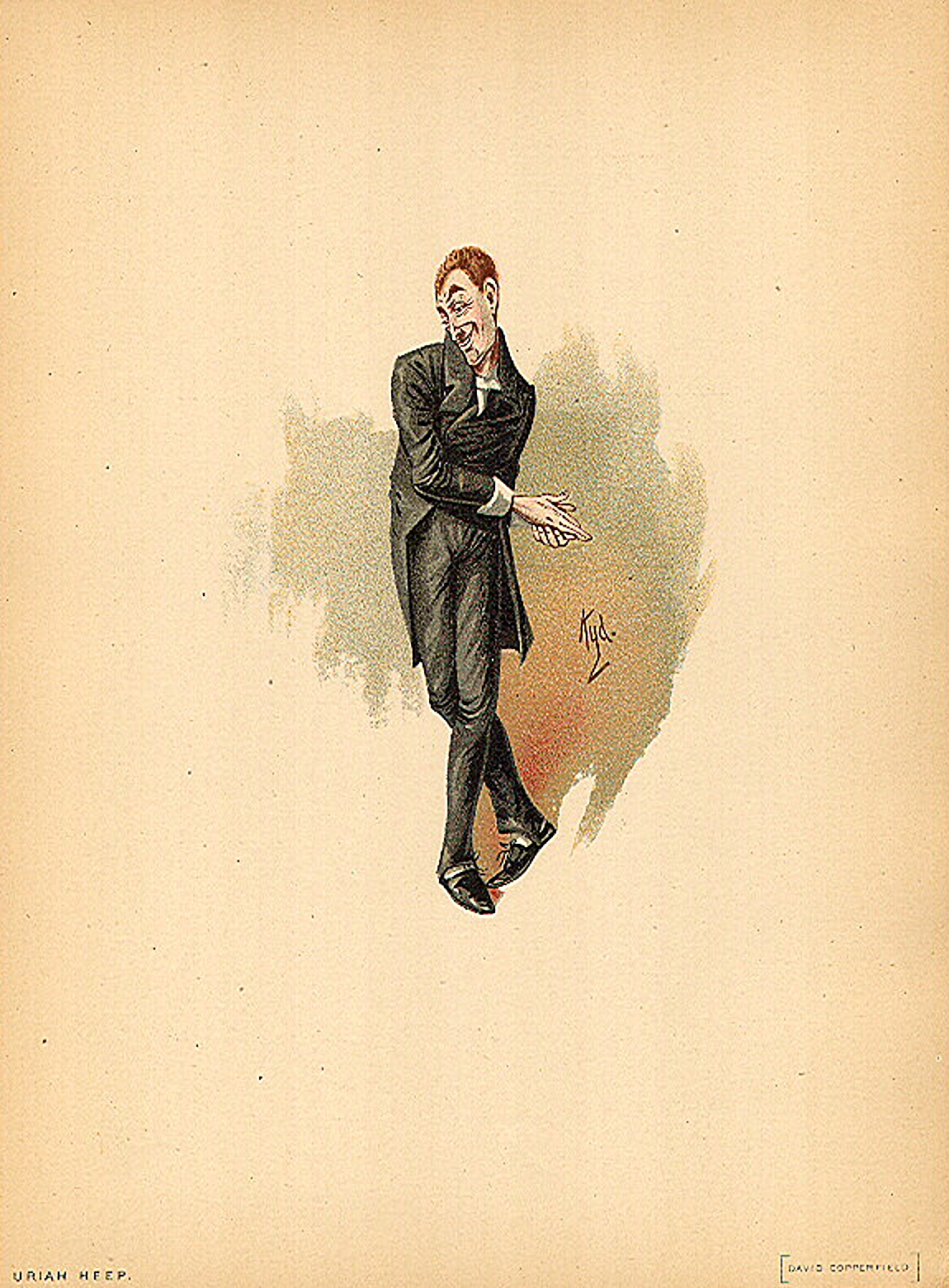
Uriah Heep from David Copperfield

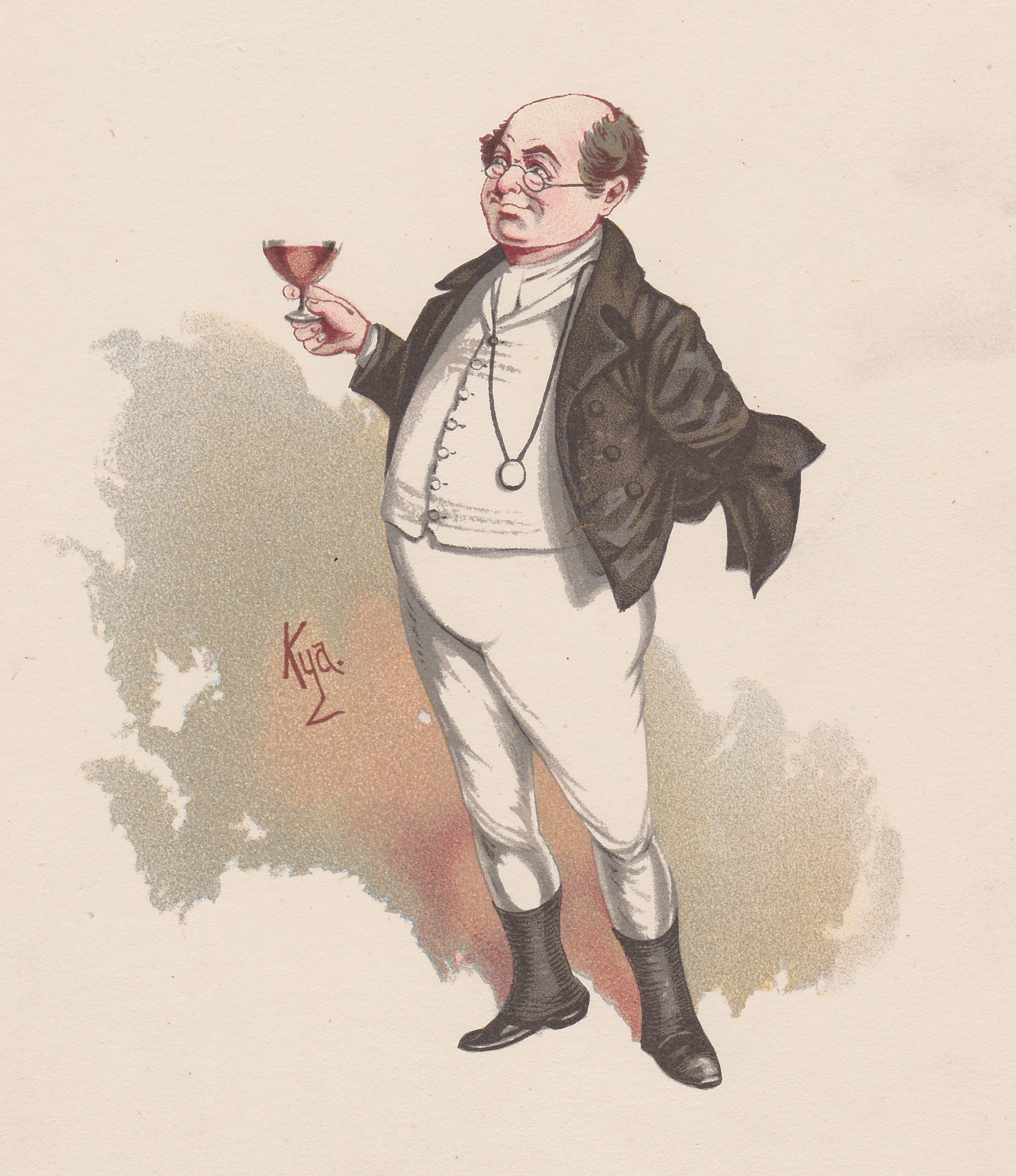
Mr Pickwick from The Pickwick Papers

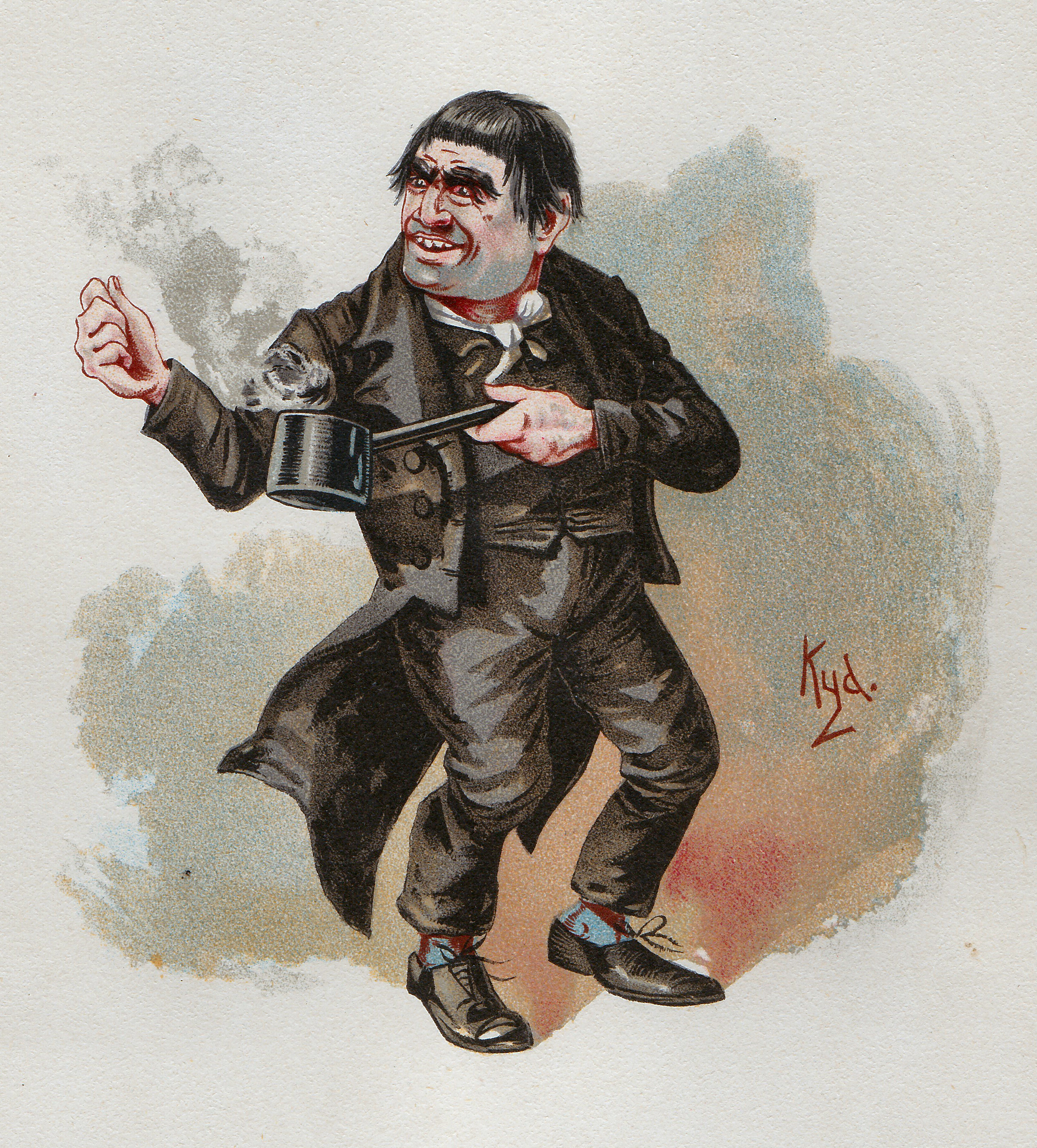
Daniel Quilp from The Old Curiosity Shop

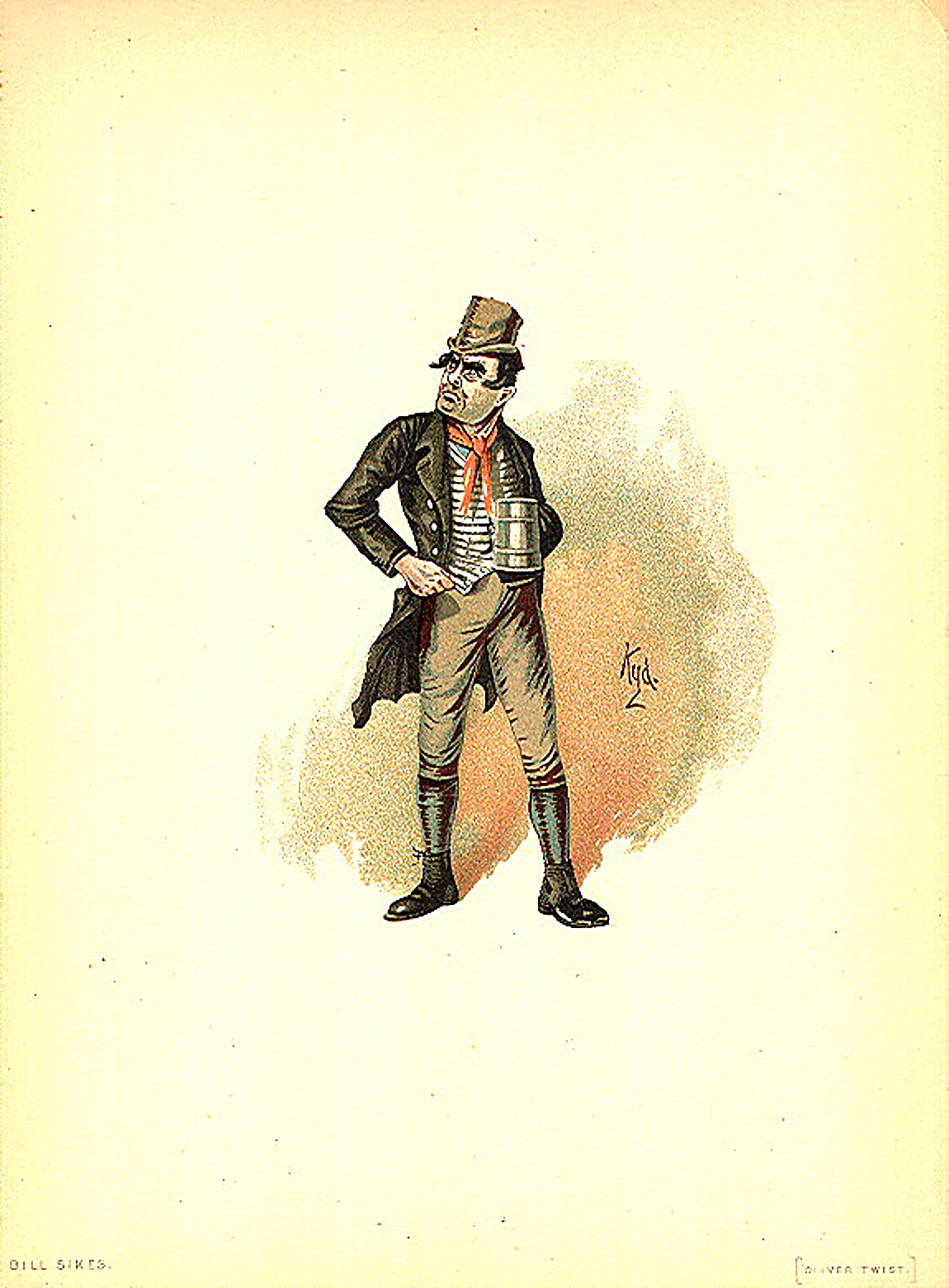
Bill Sikes from Oliver Twist

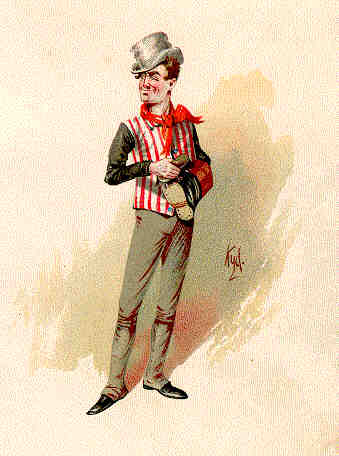
Sam Weller from The Pickwick Papers

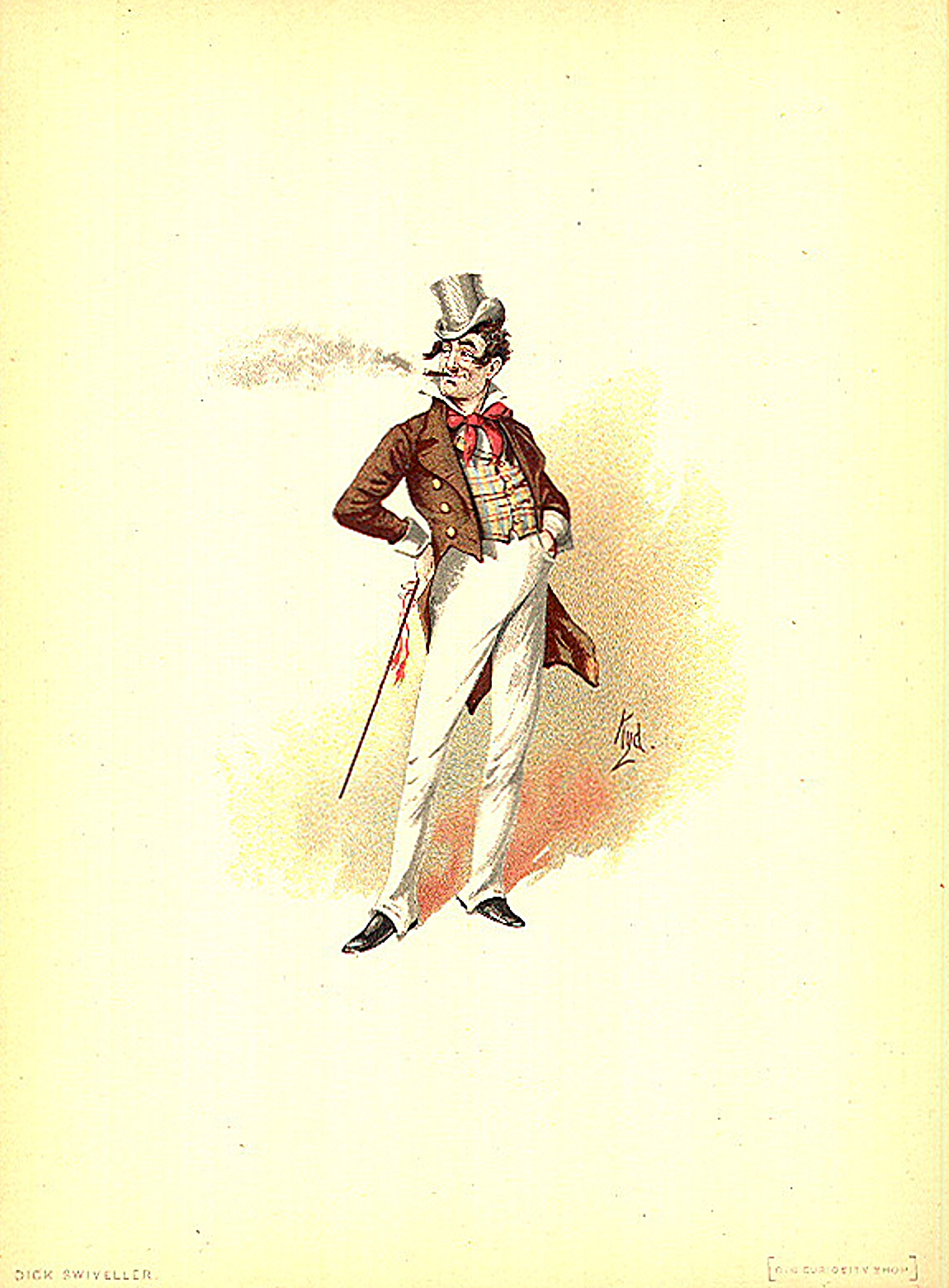
Dick Swiveller from The Old Curiosity Shop

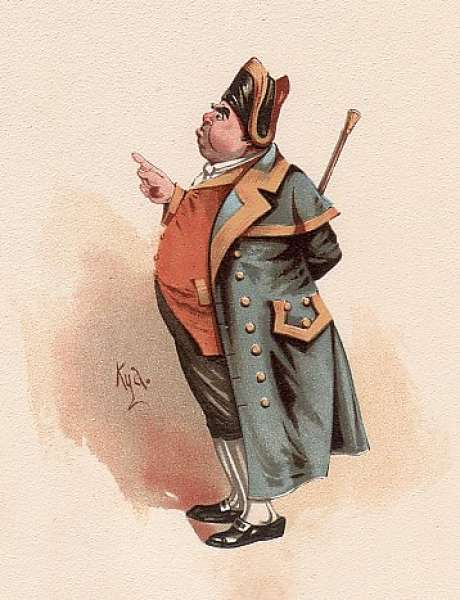
Mr Bumble from Oliver Twist

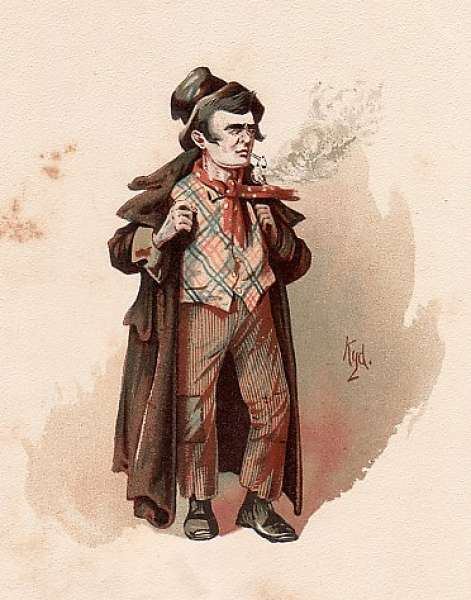
The Artful Dodger from Oliver Twist

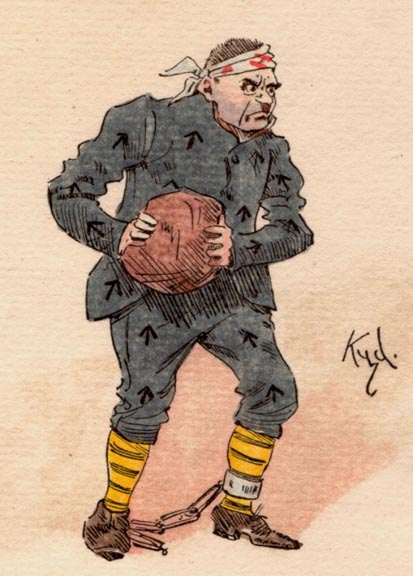
Abel Magwitch from Great Expectations

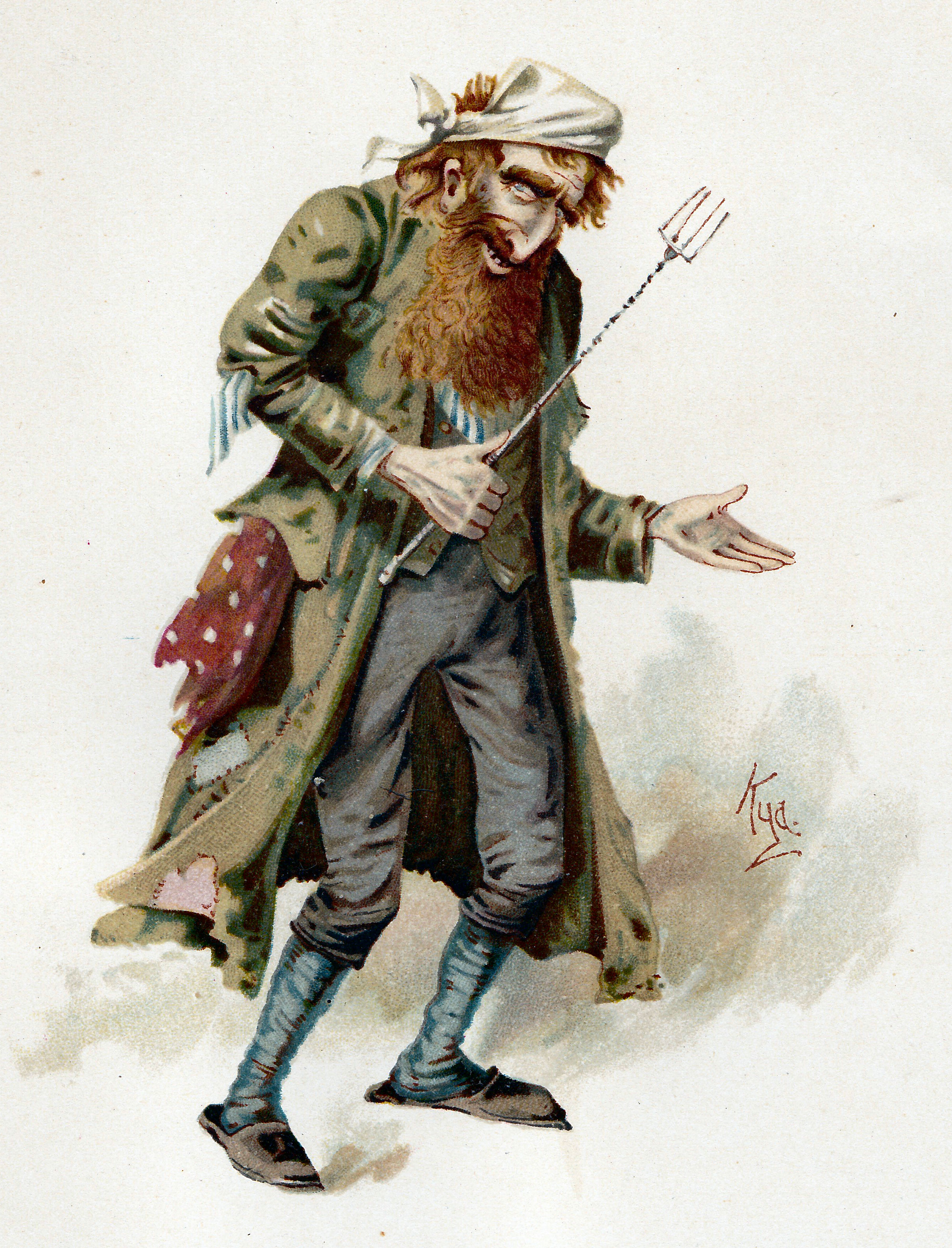
Fagin from Oliver Twist

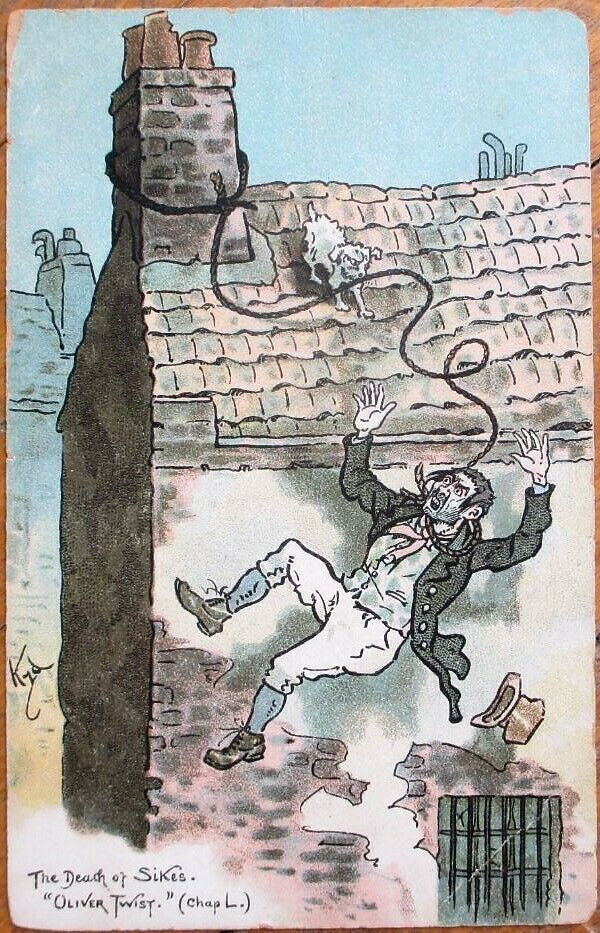
The death of Bill Sikes

== See also ==
- David Copperfield – novel by Charles Dickens
