= Hepworth Pictures =

British film company

Hepworth Picture Plays was a British film production company active during the silent era. Founded in 1897 by the cinema pioneer Cecil Hepworth, it was based at Walton Studios west of London.

In February 1909 the company took part in the Paris Film Congress, a failed attempt by leading European producers to form an organisation similar to the MPPC cartel recently established in the United States.

Around the time of the First World War, the company gradually switched from traditional short films to the feature films that increasingly dominated the world market. It also developed many early stars of British cinema, including Alma Taylor, Stewart Rome, Violet Hopson, Chrissie White, Henry Edwards and Gerald Ames.

The company attempted to expand after the war, as part of a wider boom in the British industry. Many of the company's most popular works were directed by Edwards, who starred in many of them. In 1923 the company went bankrupt and Hepworth retired from filmmaking. The studios were sold off and used by other producers.

== Filmography ==
=== Feature films ===
- David Copperfield (1913)
- Hamlet (1913)
- The Old Curiosity Shop (1914)
- The Heart of Midlothian (1914)
- Justice (1914)
- Shopgirls (1914)
- The Murdoch Trial (1914)
- The Bottle (1915)
- Her Boy (1915)
- The White Hope (1915)
- The Golden Pavement (1915)
- The Nightbirds of London (1915)
- The Man Who Stayed at Home (1915)
- Barnaby Rudge (1915)
- Sweet Lavender (1915)
- Annie Laurie (1916)
- Iris (1916)
- A Fallen Star (1916)
- Comin' Thro' the Rye (1916)
- A Bunch of Violets (1916)
- Sowing the Wind (1916)
- The House of Fortescue (1916)
- Molly Bawn (1916)
- Doorsteps (1916)
- The Grand Babylon Hotel (1916)
- The Marriage of William Ashe (1916)
- Trelawny of the Wells (1916)
- The American Heiress (1917)
- Broken Threads (1917)
- The Touch of a Child (1917)
- The Blindness of Fortune (1917)
- The Cobweb (1917)
- Her Marriage Lines (1917)
- The Man Behind 'The Times' (1917)
- The Eternal Triangle (1917)
- Merely Mrs. Stubbs (1917)
- The Failure (1917)
- Nearer My God to Thee (1917)
- A Grain of Sand (1917)
- The Hanging Judge (1918)
- Towards the Light (1918)
- Boundary House (1918)
- His Dearest Possession (1919)
- The Nature of the Beast (1919)
- Broken in the Wars (1919)
- Sheba (1919)
- The Kinsman (1919)
- Sunken Rocks (1919)
- Possession (1919)
- The Forest on the Hill (1919)
- The City of Beautiful Nonsense (1919)
- Alf's Button (1920)
- Once Aboard the Lugger (1920)
- A Temporary Vagabond (1920)
- Aylwin (1920)
- The Amazing Quest of Mr. Ernest Bliss (1920)
- Helen of Four Gates (1920)
- John Forrest Finds Himself (1920)
- Mrs. Erricker's Reputation (1920)
- The Lunatic at Large (1921)
- The Narrow Valley (1921)
- Dollars in Surrey (1921)
- Wild Heather (1921)
- The Bargain (1921)
- Tansy (1921)
- The Tinted Venus (1921)
- Mr. Justice Raffles (1921)
- Tit for Tat (1921)
- Simple Simon (1922)
- Strangling Threads (1923)
- The Naked Man (1923)
- The Pipes of Pan (1923)
- Boden's Boy (1923)
- Lily of the Alley (1923)
- Comin' Thro the Rye (1923)
- Mist in the Valley (1923)
- The World of Wonderful Reality (1924)

=== Selected short films ===
- Explosion of a Motor Car (1900)
- Alice in Wonderland (1903)
- Rescued by Rover (1905)
- Oliver Twist (1912)
- The Cloister and the Hearth (1913)
- David Garrick (1913)
- Shadows of a Great City (1913)
- The Vicar of Wakefield (1913)
- The Chimes (1914)

== Bibliography ==
- Brown, Simon David. Cecil Hepworth and the Rise of the British Film Industry 1899-1911. University of Exeter Press, 2016.
- Low, Rachael. The History of the British Film. Volume IV, 1918-1929. George Allen & Unwin, 1971.
