= The Blindness of Fortune =

1917 British film by Frank Wilson

- Directed by: Frank Wilson
- Starring: Chrissie White; Lionelle Howard; Violet Hopson
- Production company: Hepworth Pictures
- Distributed by: Hepworth Pictures
- Release date: December 1917
- Country: United Kingdom
- Languages: Silent; English intertitles

The Blindness of Fortune is a 1917 British silent drama film directed by Frank Wilson and starring Chrissie White, Lionelle Howard, and Violet Hopson.

== Cast ==
- Chrissie White as Rose Jordan
- Lionelle Howard as Sir Hector Gray
- Violet Hopson as Grace Hardfeldt
- William Felton as Basil Hardfeldt
- John MacAndrews as Joe Greenwell
- Henry Vibart as Dr. Lindley

== Bibliography ==
- Palmer, Scott. British Film Actors' Credits, 1895-1987. McFarland, 1988.
