= Aylwin (film) =

1920 British film by Henry Edwards

- Directed by: Henry Edwards
- Based on: Aylwin by Theodore Watts-Dunton
- Produced by: Cecil M. Hepworth
- Starring: Henry Edwards; Chrissie White; Gerald Ames
- Release date: July 1920 (United Kingdom)
- Country: United Kingdom

Aylwin is a 1920 British silent drama film directed by Henry Edwards and starring Edwards, Chrissie White and Gerald Ames. It is based on Theodore Watts-Dunton's 1898 novel of the same name.

== Cast ==
- Henry Edwards as Hal Aylwin
- Chrissie White as Winifred Wynne
- Gerald Ames as Wilderspin
- Mary Dibley as Sinfi Lovell
- Henry Vibart as Philip Aylwin
- Gwynne Herbert as Mrs Aylwin
- Valentine Grace as Tom Wynne
- E.C. Matthews as Shales
- Amy Lorraine as Meg Gudgeon
