= The White Hope (1915 film) =

- Directed by: Frank Wilson
- Written by: W.H.R. Trowbridge (novel); Victor Montefiore
- Starring: Stewart Rome; Violet Hopson; Lionelle Howard
- Production company: Hepworth Company
- Distributed by: Moss Films
- Release date: November 1915
- Country: United Kingdom
- Languages: Silent; English intertitles

The White Hope is a 1915 British silent sports film directed by Frank Wilson and starring Stewart Rome, Violet Hopson and Lionelle Howard. It is set in the world of boxing.

== Cast ==
- Stewart Rome as Jack Delane
- Violet Hopson as Claudia Carisbrooke
- Lionelle Howard as Durward Carisbrooke
- John MacAndrews as Shannon
- Frank Wilson as Royce
- George Gunther as Sam Crowfoot
- Chrissie White

== See also ==
- List of boxing films

== Bibliography ==
- Palmer, Scott. British Film Actors' Credits, 1895-1987. McFarland, 1988.
