= Anna the Adventuress =

1920 British silent film by Cecil Hepworth

- Directed by: Cecil M. Hepworth
- Written by: Blanche McIntosh; E. Phillips Oppenheim
- Produced by: Cecil M. Hepworth
- Starring: Alma Taylor; Jean Cadell; James Carew; Gerald Ames
- Production company: Hepworth Pictures
- Distributed by: National Photoplays
- Release date: 1 February 1920
- Running time: 6,000 feet
- Country: United Kingdom
- Language: English

Anna the Adventuress is a 1920 British silent drama film directed by Cecil Hepworth and starring Alma Taylor, Jean Cadell and James Carew. It is based on a novel by Phillips Oppenheim. Made by Hepworth Pictures at Walton Studios, it is now considered a lost film.

== Plot summary ==
Two identical sisters are able to switch places, leading to a series of unfortunate incidents.

== Cast ==
- Alma Taylor as Anna / Annabel Pelissier
- Jean Cadell as Nellie Bates
- James Carew as Montagu Hill
- Gerald Ames as Nigel Ennison
- Gwynne Herbert as Aunt
- Christine Rayner as Mrs. Ellicote
- Ronald Colman as Brendan
- James Annand as Sir John Ferringhall

== See also ==
- List of lost films
