= A Temporary Vagabond =

1920 film

- Directed by: Henry Edwards
- Written by: Henry Edwards
- Story by: Stuart Woodley
- Production company: Hepworth
- Distributed by: Butcher's Film Service
- Release date: January 1920 (United Kingdom)
- Country: United Kingdom

A Temporary Vagabond is a 1920 British silent comedy film directed by Henry Edwards and starring Edwards, Chrissie White and Stephen Ewart.

== Cast ==
- Henry Edwards - Dick Derelict
- Chrissie White - Peggie Hurst
- Stephen Ewart - James Hurst
- Gwynne Herbert - Emma
- Douglas Munro - Mike
- John MacAndrews - Davis
