= What's the Use of Grumbling =

1918 film by Henry Edwards

What's the Use of Grumbling is a 1918 British silent drama film directed by Henry Edwards and starring Basil Gill, Gwynne Herbert and Chrissie White. It was produced by Cecil Hepworth for the British Ministry of Information as propaganda during the First World War.

== Cast ==
- Basil Gill as The Man
- Gwynne Herbert as The Woman
- Chrissie White as The Girl
