= Daughter of the Wilds =

1917 British film by Frank Wilson

- Directed by: Frank Wilson
- Starring: Chrissie White
- Production company: Hepworth Pictures
- Distributed by: Hepworth Pictures
- Release date: April 1917
- Country: United Kingdom
- Languages: Silent; English intertitles

Daughter of the Wilds is a 1917 British silent drama film directed by Frank Wilson and starring Chrissie White.

== Bibliography ==
- Connelly, Robert. Motion Picture Guide Silent Film 1910-1936. Cinebooks, 1988.
