= Broken Threads =

1917 British film by Henry Edwards

Broken Threads is a 1917 British silent drama film directed by Henry Edwards and starring Edwards, Chrissie White and A.V. Bramble.

== Plot ==
A young woman is believed to have drowned after an accident near a lighthouse. She survives and escapes from the lighthouse keeper. When she returns home she discovers her husband has lost his sanity. She also learns he has been falsely accused of murder.

== Cast ==
- Henry Edwards as Jack Desmond
- Chrissie White as Helen Desmond
- A.V. Bramble as Pierre
- Harry Gilbey as Murray
- Gwynne Herbert as housekeeper
- W.G. Saunders as Boniface
- Fred Johnson as Helen's Stepfather
- John MacAndrews as Confederate
