= Towards the Light (1918 film) =

1918 film by Henry Edwards

Towards the Light is a 1918 British silent drama film directed by Henry Edwards and starring Edwards, Chrissie White and A.V. Bramble.

== Plot ==
A hunchback marries a girl whose father escapes jail, desperate to prove his innocence.

== Cast ==
- Henry Edwards - Surly
- Chrissie White - Annie Wilton
- A.V. Bramble - Convict
- Marsh Allen - Rex Richards
- Henry Vibart - Reverend Thorne
- George Traill - Neighbour
- John MacAndrews - Villager
