= The Cobweb (1917 film) =

1917 British film by Cecil M. Hepworth

- Directed by: Cecil M. Hepworth
- Written by: Naunton Davies (play); Leon M. Lion (play)
- Produced by: Cecil M. Hepworth
- Starring: Henry Edwards; Alma Taylor; Stewart Rome
- Cinematography: Geoffrey Faithfull
- Production company: Hepworth Picture Plays
- Distributed by: Harma Photoplays
- Release date: January 1917
- Running time: 60 min
- Country: United Kingdom
- Languages: Silent; English intertitles

The Cobweb is a 1917 British silent thriller film directed by Cecil M. Hepworth and starring Henry Edwards, Alma Taylor and Stewart Rome. A millionaire mistakenly believes that he has murdered his Mexican wife. It is based on the play The Cobweb by Naunton Davies and Leon M. Lion.

== Plot summary ==
A millionaire is being blackmailed by his Mexican wife. He strangles her, and believes he killed her. However, she actually died of shock.

== Cast ==
- Henry Edwards as Stephen Mallard
- Alma Taylor as Irma Brian
- Stewart Rome as Merton Forsdyke
- Violet Hopson as Dolorosa
- Marguerite Blanche as Miss Debb
- Lionelle Howard as Poacher
- John MacAndrews as Inspector Beall
- Charles Vane as Sir George Gillingham
- Molly Hamley-Clifford as Mrs. Brian

== Bibliography ==
- Palmer, Scott. British Film Actors' Credits, 1895-1987. McFarland, 1988.
