= The Eternal Triangle (film) =

- Directed by: Frank Wilson
- Written by: Percy Gordon Holmes
- Starring: Chrissie White; Lionelle Howard; Stewart Rome; Violet Hopson
- Production company: Hepworth Pictures
- Distributed by: Pioneer Film Distributors
- Release date: March 1917
- Running time: 5 reels
- Country: United Kingdom
- Languages: Silent; English intertitles

The Eternal Triangle is a 1917 British silent romance film directed by Frank Wilson and starring Chrissie White, Stewart Rome and Violet Hopson. A woman loves a poor squire's son but marries a much wealthier playwright who is subsequently killed in a car accident.

== Cast ==
- Chrissie White as Margaret Clive
- Stewart Rome as Frank Waring
- Violet Hopson as Audrey
- Lionelle Howard as Sackville Horton
- W.G. Saunders as Squire Waring
- Harry Gilbey
- Mrs. Bedells

== Bibliography ==
- Palmer, Scott. British Film Actors' Credits, 1895-1987. McFarland, 1988.
