= Barnaby Rudge (film) =

1915 British film by Cecil Hepworth, Thomas Bentley

- Directed by: Thomas Bentley; Cecil M. Hepworth
- Written by: Thomas Bentley; Charles Dickens
- Produced by: Cecil M. Hepworth
- Starring: Tom Powers; Violet Hopson; Stewart Rome; Chrissie White
- Production company: Hepworth Pictures
- Distributed by: Hepworth Pictures
- Release date: 1 March 1915
- Running time: 5 reels
- Country: United Kingdom
- Languages: Silent; English intertitles

Barnaby Rudge is a 1915 British silent drama film directed by Thomas Bentley and Cecil M. Hepworth and starring Tom Powers, Stewart Rome and Violet Hopson. It was an adaptation of the 1841 novel Barnaby Rudge by Charles Dickens which was set amidst the 1780 Gordon Riots in London.

The film was made at Walton Studios by Hepworth Pictures, where Bentley had directed several ambitious Dickens adaptations. The production was considered a lavish spectacle by critics, particularly the restaging on the climactic riots, which involved over 1,500 extras. The sets were designed by the art director Warwick Buckland. The film is now considered lost, although a handful of production stills have survived.

== Cast ==
- Tom Powers as Barnaby Rudge
- Violet Hopson as Emma Haresdale
- Stewart Rome as Maypole Hugh
- Chrissie White as Dolly Varden
- Lionelle Howard as Edward Chester
- John MacAndrews as Geoffrey Haredale
- Henry Vibart as Sir John Chester
- Harry Gilbey as Lord George Gordon
- Harry Royston as Dennis
- Harry Buss as Simon Tappertit
- William Felton as Mr. Rudge
- William Langley as Gabriel Varden

== Bibliography ==
- Low, Rachael. The History of the British Film 1914 – 1918, Volume 3. Routledge, 2013.
