= Mr. Justice =

Mr. Justice or Mister Justice may refer to

== Comics ==
- Mister Justice (comics), a Marvel Comics character
- Mr. Justice, an MLJ Comics / Archie Comics character; see Terrific Three

== Literature ==
- Mr. Justice Raffles, a novel
  - Mr. Justice Raffles (film), its film adaptation

== Judicial title ==
- The title in office of judges in various courts in common law jurisdictions, including:
  - High Court judge (England and Wales)
  - Federal and state court judges in Australia
  - Federal and provincial court judges in Canada
  - High Court of New Zealand and Supreme Court of New Zealand judges in New Zealand
  - High Court (Hong Kong) and Court of Final Appeal (Hong Kong) judges in Hong Kong
