= Victory and Peace =

1918 British war film

- Directed by: Herbert Brenon
- Written by: Hall Caine
- Produced by: William F. Jury
- Starring: Matheson Lang; Marie Lohr; James Carew; Ellen Terry
- Cinematography: J. Roy Hunt
- Edited by: James C. Mckay
- Production company: National War Aims Committee
- Distributed by: National War Aims Committee
- Release date: 31 December 1918
- Running time: 9000 feet c. 80 minutes
- Country: United Kingdom
- Languages: Silent; English intertitles

Victory and Peace is a 1918 British silent war film directed by Herbert Brenon and starring Matheson Lang, Marie Lohr, and James Carew. The film was produced by the National War Aims Committee that was set up in 1917 to focus on domestic propaganda during the First World War. The novelist Hall Caine was recruited for the committee by the Prime Minister David Lloyd George to write the screenplay. Lloyd George chose Caine due to his experience in the field of cinema and his "reputation as a man of letters". The film was designed to show what would happen in a German invasion. It was mostly shot in Chester with some scenes filmed at Chirk Castle. Most of the negative of the newly finished film was destroyed in a fire at the offices of the London Film Company in June 1918. It was re-filmed over four months, just as the war ended, and so never went on general release. It is a partially lost film, with only around 1,000 feet of film still surviving. Edward Elgar was to have composed the score. Originally entitled The National Film, its alternative title is The Invasion of Britain.

== Cast ==
- Matheson Lang as Edward Arkwright
- Marie Lohr as Barbara Rowntree
- James Carew as Karl Hoffman
- Ellen Terry as Widow Weaver
- Renée Mayer as Jenny Banks
- Hayford Hobbs as Charlie Caine
- Frederick Kerr as Sir Richard Arkwright
- José Collins as Madge Brierley
- Sam Livesey as Capt. Schiff
- Edith Craig as Mary Rountree
- Bertram Wallis as Bob Brierley
- Ben Greet as Mayor of Castleton
- Harding Thomas as Jim Banks
- Arthur Applin as Capt. von Lindheimer
- Henry Vibart as Bishop
- Sydney Lewis Ransome as Rev. Paul Brayton
- Joyce Templeton as Joyce Brierley
- Helena Millais as Liz Lowery
- Rolf Leslie as Abraham Lincoln

== See also ==
- Invasion literature

== Bibliography ==
- Allen, Vivien. Hall Caine: Portrait of a Victorian Romancer. Continuum, 1997.
- Low, Rachael. History of the British Film, 1914-1918. Routledge, 2005.
- Slide, Anthony (2015), A Special Relationship: Britain Comes to Hollywood and Hollywood Comes to Britain, United States: University.Press of Mississippi, ISBN 978-0-853-23777-8
