= Alf's Button (1920 film) =

1920 British silent film by Cecil Hepworth

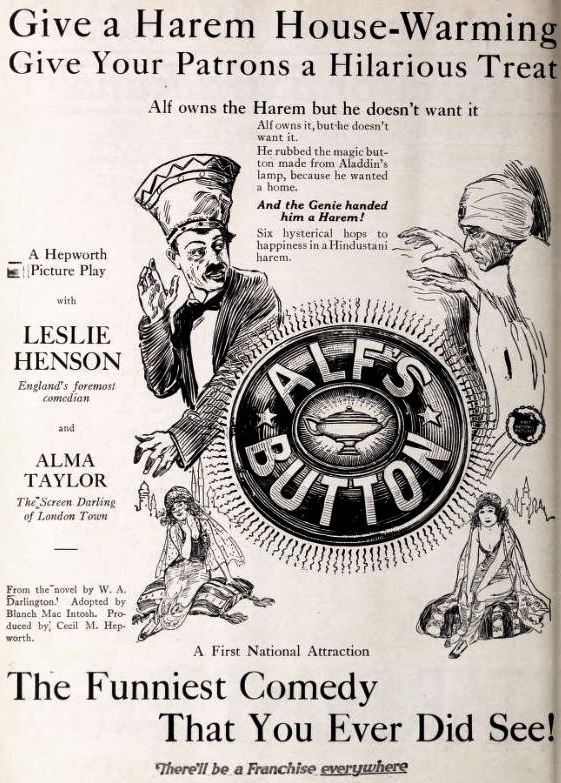
- American advertisement
- Directed by: Cecil Hepworth
- Written by: Blanche McIntosh
- Based on: Alf's Button by William Darlington
- Produced by: Cecil Hepworth
- Starring: Leslie Henson; Alma Taylor; Gerald Ames; James Carew
- Production company: Hepworth Pictures
- Distributed by: Hepworth Pictures (U.K.); First National (U.S.)
- Release date: May 1920 (U.K.)
- Running time: 7 reels
- Country: United Kingdom
- Language: Silent (English intertitles)

Alf's Button is a 1920 British silent fantasy comedy film directed by Cecil Hepworth and starring Leslie Henson, Alma Taylor and Gerald Ames. It was based on the 1920 novel Alf's Button by William Darlington. The film is about a British soldier who discovers a magic coat button which summons a genie to grant his various wishes. It was remade as a sound film in 1930.

It was shot at Walton Studios.

== Plot ==
As described in a film magazine, during World War I, Alf (Henson) discovers that he has a brass button which, when he rubs it, summons Eustace (Carew), a genie. While in the trenches, the genie brings Alf and his friend Bill (MacAndrews) goblets of beer, pretty young women, a bath, and anything their hearts desire. Finally, Alf is discharged from the Army and marries Liz (Taylor), who returns the button to the genie.

== Production ==
- Produced by: Cecil M. Hepworth
- Screenplay by: Blanche MacIntosh
- Production Company: Hepworth Manufacturing Company

== Cast ==
- Leslie Henson as Alf Higgins
- Alma Taylor as Liz
- Gerald Ames as Lt. Denis Allen
- James Carew as Eustace, the genie
- Eileen Dennes as Lady Isobel Fitzpeter
- John MacAndrews as Bill Grant
- Gwynne Herbert as Lady Fitzpeter
- Jean Cadell as Vicar's wife

== Bibliography ==
- Low, Rachael. History of the British Film, 1918-1929. George Allen & Unwin, 1971. ISBN 978-0-04-791021-0.
