= Molly Bawn (film) =

- Directed by: Cecil M. Hepworth
- Written by: Margaret Wolfe Hungerford (novel); Blanche McIntosh
- Produced by: Cecil M. Hepworth
- Starring: Violet Hopson; Alma Taylor; Stewart Rome
- Cinematography: Geoffrey Faithfull
- Production company: Hepworth Picture Plays
- Distributed by: Hepworth Pictures
- Release date: December 1916
- Country: United Kingdom
- Languages: Silent; English intertitles

Molly Bawn is a 1916 British silent drama film directed by Cecil M. Hepworth and starring Alma Taylor, Stewart Rome and Violet Hopson. It is an adaptation of the 1878 Irish novel Molly Bawn by Margaret Wolfe Hungerford.

== Cast ==
- Alma Taylor as Eleanor Massareene
- Stewart Rome as Tedcastle Luttrell
- Violet Hopson as Marcia Amherst
- Lionelle Howard as Philip Shadwell
- Fred Wright as Mr. Amherst
- Chrissie White as Lady Cecil Stafford
- John MacAndrews as John Massareene
- Henry Vibart as Marigny
- Valerie McClintock as Letitia Massareene
- Percy Manton as Plantaganet Potts

== Bibliography ==
- Goble, Alan. The Complete Index to Literary Sources in Film. Walter de Gruyter, 1999.
