= The Hanging Judge (film) =

1918 film

The Hanging Judge is a 1918 British silent drama film directed by Henry Edwards and starring Edwards, Chrissie White and Hamilton Stewart. Its plot concerns the son of a notorious judge, who is put on trial for murder. It was based on a play by Tom Gallon and Leon M. Lion.

== Plot ==
A judge's disowned son becomes a reporter and marries a condemned man's daughter.

== Cast ==
- Henry Edwards - Dick Veasey
- Chrissie White - Molly
- Hamilton Stewart - Sir John Veasey
- Randle Ayrton - Reginald Tamlyn
- Gwynne Herbert - Lady Veasey
- A.V. Bramble - The Prosecution
- John MacAndrews - Ned Blake
