= The White Boys (film) =

- Directed by: Frank Wilson
- Starring: Chrissie White; Lionelle Howard; Stewart Rome
- Production company: Hepworth Pictures
- Distributed by: Hepworth Pictures
- Release date: May 1916
- Country: United Kingdom
- Languages: Silent; English intertitles

The White Boys is a 1916 British silent drama film directed by Frank Wilson and starring Stewart Rome, Chrissie White and Lionelle Howard.

== Cast ==
- Stewart Rome
- Chrissie White
- Lionelle Howard

== Bibliography ==
- Palmer, Scott. British Film Actors' Credits, 1895-1987. McFarland, 1988.
