= The Man Behind 'The Times' =

- Directed by: Frank Wilson
- Written by: Percy Manton
- Starring: Chrissie White; Lionelle Howard; Stewart Rome
- Production company: Hepworth Pictures
- Distributed by: Harma Photoplays
- Release date: February 1917
- Running time: 4 reels
- Country: United Kingdom
- Languages: Silent; English intertitles

The Man Behind 'The Times' is a 1917 British silent crime film directed by Frank Wilson and starring Stewart Rome, Chrissie White and Lionelle Howard.

== Cast ==
- Stewart Rome as Aaron Moss
- Chrissie White as Jet Overbury
- Lionelle Howard as Allan Garth
- Harry Gilbey as John Overbury
- Charles Vane as John walcott
- Mrs. Bedells as Mrs. Overbury
- John MacAndrews as Doctor
- Johnny Butt as Clerk

== Bibliography ==
- Palmer, Scott. British Film Actors' Credits, 1895-1987. McFarland, 1988.
