= Comin' Thro the Rye (film) =

1923 British film by Cecil Hepworth

- Directed by: Cecil Hepworth
- Written by: Blanche McIntosh
- Based on: Comin' Through the Rye; 1875 novel by Helen Mathers
- Produced by: Hepworth Picture Plays
- Starring: Alma Taylor; Ralph Forbes
- Cinematography: Geoffrey Faithfull
- Production company: Hepworth Picture Plays
- Release date: 1923
- Running time: 115 minutes
- Country: United Kingdom
- Languages: Silent film English intertitles

Comin' Thro the Rye is a 1923 British silent drama film directed by Cecil Hepworth and starring Alma Taylor and Ralph Forbes. The film was based on the 1875 novel of the same name by Helen Mathers. The title alludes to the Robert Burns 1782 poem "Comin' Thro' the Rye".

A clip of it is seen in the comedy The Smallest Show on Earth (1957), in which the elderly staff of the old fleapit cinema tearfully watch silent films after the cinema has closed for the evening.

== Plot ==
The story of a young girl who is prevented from marrying the man she loves by the machinations of a designing woman. The plot centres on the heroine, Helen Adair, who is courted by George Tempest but who meets and falls in love with Paul Vasher. Vasher's former love Sylvia Fleming who has betrayed him, is jealous of his affections for Helen and manages by intercepting mail between the lovers to plot to win him back.

While Vasher is abroad she places a false announcement of the marriage of Helen and George in the Times and in his despair at this news he agrees to marry her. Sylvia is trapped in a loveless marriage, Helen retains her virtue, Vasher never forgets his love for Helen and in a final letter from the battlefield writes to his true love telling her he will meet her 'Comin' through the rye'.

== Cast ==
- Alma Taylor as Helen Adair
- Shayle Gardner as Paul Vasher
- Eileen Dennes as Sylvia Fleming
- Ralph Forbes as George Tempest
- James Carew as Col. Adair
- Francis Lister as Dick Fellowes
- Gwynne Herbert as Mrs. Adair
- Henry Vibart as Mr. Tempest
- Christine Rayner as Jane Peach
- Nancy Price as Mrs. Titmouse
- John MacAndrews as Simpkins
- Margot Armstrong as Alice Adair
