= His Dearest Possession =

1919 film

His Dearest Possession is a 1919 British drama film directed by Henry Edwards and starring Edwards, Chrissie White and John MacAndrews. It was based on a story by E. Temple Thurston. The film follows an artist who falls in love with a woman and gives up painting in order to get a more secure job.

== Cast ==
- Henry Edwards - Stephen Ayliff
- Chrissie White - Red Emma Lobb
- John MacAndrews - Herbert Lobb
- Esme Hubbard - Mrs Lobb
- Gwynne Herbert - The cottager
- Eric Barker - Charlie Lobb
