= The White Hope (1922 film) =

1922 film

- Directed by: Frank Wilson
- Starring: Stewart Rome; Violet Hopson; John MacAndrews
- Production company: Broadwest
- Release date: October 1922
- Country: United Kingdom
- Languages: Silent; English intertitles

The White Hope is a 1922 British silent sports film directed by Frank Wilson and starring Violet Hopson, Stuart Rome and John MacAndrews. It is a remake of Wilson's own 1915 film of the same name with many of the same cast members.

== Cast ==
- Violet Hopson as Claudia Carisbrooke
- Stewart Rome as Jack Delane
- Frank Wilson as Joe Shannon
- John MacAndrews as Daddy Royce
- Kid Gordon as Sam Crowfoot

== Bibliography ==
- Low, Rachael. History of the British Film, 1918-1929. George Allen & Unwin, 1971.
