= Love's Option =

1928 film

- Directed by: George Pearson
- Written by: Douglas Newton (novel)
- Starring: Dorothy Boyd; Patrick Aherne; James Carew; Henry Vibart
- Cinematography: Bernard Knowles
- Edited by: Thorold Dickinson
- Production company: Welsh-Pearson-Elder
- Distributed by: Paramount British Pictures
- Release date: 25 September 1928
- Running time: 66 minutes
- Country: United Kingdom
- Languages: Silent; English intertitles

Love's Option is a 1928 British silent adventure film directed by George Pearson and starring Dorothy Boyd, Patrick Aherne and James Carew. It was made at Cricklewood Studios based on the novel The Riddle by Douglas Newton. The film was distributed by Paramount Pictures' British subsidiary, enabling the company to meet its yearly quota set down by the British government. The film follows several rivals attempting to gain control of a valuable Spanish copper mine. It was known by the alternative title A Girl of Today.

== Cast ==
- Dorothy Boyd as Dorothy
- Patrick Aherne as John Dacre
- James Carew as Simon Wake
- Henry Vibart as Lucien Wake
- Scotch Kelly as Pat Kelly
- Philip Hewland as Tom Bartlett
- Cecil Barry

== Bibliography ==
- Chibnall, Steve. Quota Quickies: The Birth of the British 'B' film. British Film Institute, 2007.
- Low, Rachel. The History of British Film: Volume IV, 1918–1929. Routledge, 1997.
