= The Narrow Valley =

1921 film

- Directed by: Cecil Hepworth
- Written by: George Dewhurst
- Starring: Alma Taylor; George Dewhurst
- Production company: Hepworth Picture Plays
- Distributed by: Hepworth
- Release dates: 8 June 1921 (trade show); 29 August 1921 (theatrical release)
- Running time: 5400 feet
- Country: United Kingdom
- Language: Silent

The Narrow Valley is a 1921 British silent drama film directed by Cecil Hepworth. As of August 2010, the film is missing from the BFI National Archive, and is listed as one of the British Film Institute's "75 Most Wanted" lost films.

== Plot ==
A draper's maid lives a quiet life in her village. She falls in love with the son of a local poacher. Their romance faces opposition from the village watch committee, who disapprove of her presence and try to force her out. Despite the committee's efforts, the maid and the poacher's son successfully marry.

== Cast ==
- Alma Taylor as Victoria
- George Dewhurst as Jerry Hawkins
- James Carew as Eli Jones
- Hugh Clifton as Richard Jones
- Gwynne Herbert as Ursula Jones
- Lottie Blackford as Miss Pine

== See also ==
- List of lost films
