= Three Men in a Boat (1933 film) =

- Directed by: Graham Cutts
- Written by: Reginald Purdell; D.B. Wyndham-Lewis
- Produced by: Basil Dean
- Starring: William Austin; Edmund Breon; Billy Milton; Davy Burnaby
- Cinematography: Robert Martin
- Music by: Ord Hamilton
- Production company: Associated Talking Pictures
- Distributed by: ABFD
- Release date: May 1933
- Running time: 60 minutes
- Country: United Kingdom
- Language: English

Three Men in a Boat (also known as 3 Men in a Boat) is a 1933 British comedy film directed by Graham Cutts and starring William Austin, Edmund Breon, Billy Milton and Davy Burnaby. It was written by Reginald Purdell and D.B. Wyndham-Lewis based on the 1889 novel Three Men in a Boat by Jerome K. Jerome which depicts three men and a dog's adventure during a boat trip along the River Thames.

== Plot ==
Harris, George and Jimmy, accompanied by Montmorency the dog, set off on a river camping holiday. Mooring by Sir Henry Harland's gardens draws the landowner's wrath, until Harris discovers that Sir Henry is his cousin. Meanwhile Jimmy falls in love with Sir Henry's daughter Peggy. Harris and George play a practical joke on Jimmy, who is arrested, but George poses as Sir Henry to secure his release."

== Cast ==
- William Austin as Harris
- Edmund Breon as George
- Billy Milton as Jimmy
- Davy Burnaby as Sir Henry Harland
- Iris March as Peggy
- Griffith Humphreys as Sergeant
- Stephen Ewart as doctor
- Victor Stanley as cockney
- Frank Bertram as fisherman
- Sam Wilkinson as Police Constable
- Winifred Evans as Lady Harland

== Reception ==
Kine Weekly wrote: "Comedy, a sketchy, but nevertheless refreshing and mildly amusing adaptation of Jerome K. Jerome's famous story of riverside misadventures. The producer has taken liberties with the original, and has failed to establish clear continuity, but really good characterisation and delightful riverside settings partly atone for the shortcomings. Within its limitations the film makes pleasant, innocuous entertainment and can be safely exploited on the average two-feature programme."

The Daily Film Renter wrote: "Talkie version of Jerome K. Jerome story, with introduction of heroine, a 'theme song,' and other features not contained in the novel. Fairly amusing river comedy preserves spirit of original, but climax descends to broad slapstick of painfully naive character."

Variety wrote: "Jerome K. Jerome's famous novel has been manhandled in this picture. All that's left are two silly ass English characters with a vague straight man, who take a trip up the Thames on a holiday and get into a lot of inane complications. ... Good, business-like direction, well chosen bucolic character types, but the whole thing is trivial and inconsequential."

== Bibliography ==
- Perry, George. Forever Ealing. Pavilion Books, 1994.
