= Annie Esmond =

British actress (1873–1945)

Annie Esmond (27 September 1873 – 4 January 1945) was a British stage and film actress.

Esmond was born in Surrey, England. She made her stage debut in pantomime in Sheffield in 1891 and later appeared on the American as well as British stage for many years before going into silent films and later talkies. She became a prolific supporting actress in films, often playing servants and nannies, as in Dear Octopus (1943).

== Selected filmography ==
- The Right Element (1919)
- Damaged Goods (1919)
- Possession (1919)
- Unmarried (1920)
- The Tidal Wave (1920)
- Tit for Tat (1921)
- Kipps (1921)
- The Knave of Diamonds (1921)
- The Mystery of Mr. Bernard Brown (1921)
- Innocent (1921)
- Mr. Pim Passes By (1921)
- The Yellow Claw (1921)
- The Recoil (1922)
- The Passionate Friends (1922)
- The Flying Fifty-Five (1924)
- The Sins Ye Do (1924)
- God's Clay (1928)
- After the Verdict (1929)
- Alf's Button (1930)
- To Oblige a Lady (1931)
- The Officers' Mess (1931)
- The Outsider (1931)
- Almost a Divorce (1931)
- Sally Bishop (1932)
- Service for Ladies (1932)
- I'll Stick to You (1933)
- Head of the Family (1933)
- The Private Life of Henry VIII (1933) as Cook's Wife
- The Private Life of Don Juan (1934)
- It's a Cop (1934)
- Lucky Loser (1934)
- The Iron Duke (1934)
- Virginia's Husband (1934)
- Royal Cavalcade (1935)
- Abdul the Damned (1935)
- Lend Me Your Husband (1935)
- Gay Old Dog (1935)
- All That Glitters (1936)
- The Improper Duchess (1936)
- The Crimes of Stephen Hawke (1936)
- Thunder in the City (1937)
- Bulldog Drummond at Bay (1937)
- His Lordship Regrets (1938)
- Save a Little Sunshine (1938)
- Stolen Life (1939)
- Cottage to Let (1941)
- Gert and Daisy's Weekend (1942)
- Let the People Sing (1942)
- Dear Octopus (1943)
