= Annie Laurie (1916 film) =

1916 British silent film by Cecil Hepworth

- Directed by: Cecil Hepworth
- Written by: Alma Taylor
- Produced by: Cecil Hepworth
- Starring: Alma Taylor; Stewart Rome; Lionelle Howard; Gwynne Herbert
- Production company: Hepworth Pictures
- Release date: 1916
- Running time: 4 reels (approximately 40 minutes)
- Country: United Kingdom

Annie Laurie is a 1916 British silent romance film directed by Cecil Hepworth and starring Alma Taylor, Stewart Rome and Lionelle Howard. It is loosely based on the poem Annie Laurie.

== Cast ==
- Alma Taylor as Annie Laurie
- Stewart Rome as Sir John McDougal
- Lionelle Howard as Alfred English
- Gwynne Herbert as Hannah Black
- Henry Vibart as The Doctor
