= Dollars in Surrey =

1921 British film by George Dewhurst

- Directed by: George Dewhurst; Anson Dyer
- Written by: George Dewhurst
- Starring: Alma Taylor; James Carew; Hugh Clifton
- Production company: Hepworth Pictures
- Distributed by: Hepworth Pictures
- Release date: 31 August 1921
- Country: United Kingdom
- Languages: Silent; English intertitles

Dollars in Surrey is a 1921 British silent comedy film directed by George Dewhurst and Anson Dyer and starring Alma Taylor, James Carew and Hugh Clifton.

== Cast ==
- Alma Taylor
- James Carew
- Hugh Clifton
- Gwynne Herbert
- Esme Hubbard
- Victor Prout
- Rolf Leslie
- Wallace Bosco

== Bibliography ==
- Robert B. Connelly. The Silents: Silent Feature Films, 1910-36. December Press, 1998.
