= The Poet's Windfall =

1918 film

The Poet's Windfall is a 1918 British silent drama film directed by Henry Edwards and starring Edwards, John MacAndrews, and Chrissie White.

== Cast ==
- Henry Edwards as The Poet
- John MacAndrews as The Man
- Chrissie White as The Girl
