= Lily of the Alley =

1924 film

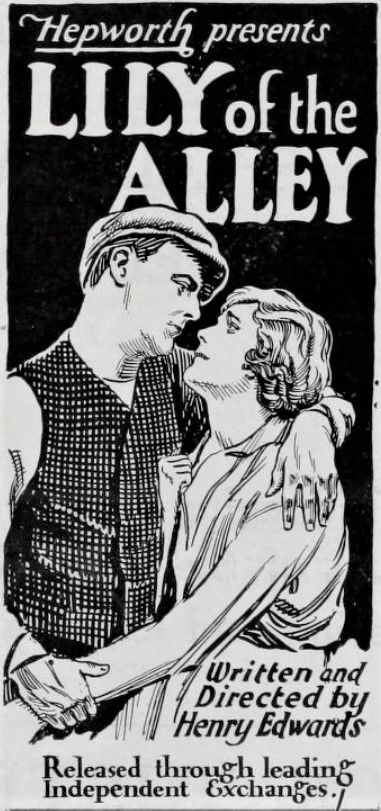
- American advertisement
- Directed by: Henry Edwards
- Written by: Henry Edwards
- Produced by: Henry Edwards
- Starring: Henry Edwards; Chrissie White
- Cinematography: Charles Bryce
- Distributed by: Hepworth Pictures
- Release date: February 1924
- Running time: 6590 feet; 7 reels
- Country: United Kingdom
- Language: Silent film without intertitles

Lily of the Alley is a lost 1924 British silent film drama directed, written and produced by Henry Edwards, who also starred in the film with his wife Chrissie White.

The film was experimental in form, with Edwards attempting the innovation of producing a coherent screen narrative entirely without the use of intertitles.

== Preservation status ==
In 1992 the British Film Institute classed Lily of the Alley as a lost film, included in its "75 Most Wanted" list. Its National Archive holds a collection of stills but no film or video materials. The BFI has speculated that the film was destroyed by bailiffs when the production company, Hepworth Pictures, went bankrupt in 1924.

== Plot ==
Bill and Lily are newly married. Bert works as a tea salesman and is of a naturally cheery disposition. Over time however, worries about the security of his job and income prey on his mind and he frets over not being able to provide for Lily. With his worries heightened by the fear that he is about to go blind, he falls into a deep depression and becomes a shadow of the happy soul he used to be. Lily becomes desperately anxious about him, and one night has a terrible nightmare in which she dreams that he loses first his sight and then his life (either in a fire, or by being robbed and murdered, depending on the source). However things eventually take a turn for the better and the couple welcome their new baby to the family.

== Cast ==
- Henry Edwards as Bill
- Chrissie White as Lily
- Frank Stanmore as Alf
- Mary Brough as widow
- Campbell Gullan as Snarkey
- Lionel d'Aragon as dad

== Release ==
Lily of the Alley was filmed in 1922 and given trade showings in early 1923, but its general release to cinemas was delayed until February 1924.

== Reception ==
Kine Weekly wrote: "Whatever the faults this picture may possess, and there are a good many, it, nevertheless, is interesting as an attempt to get away from the beaten track by dispensing with all sub-titles. Generally speaking, the result is satisfactory, but it is unfortunate that the story pictured has very little plot, and that to make matters worse the climax spoils any dramatic value by turning out to be a dream. On the other hand, the acting, characterisation and setting are all very good indeed. ... There is little story value, and the climax with its dream anti-climax negatives any interest that it may have had. There is, on the other hand, a strong appeal in the characterisation of the coster types and in the numerous touches of humour throughout the picture. Besides this, the acting of all the artistes is an attraction and the settings are worthy of notice. ... Henry Edwards is very good, indeed, as Bill, especially in his drunken scenes and in the brighter parts. Chrissie White plays opposite with a good deal of charm and feeling. Mary Brough is as delightful as ever as a widow, and the Alf of Frank Stanmore is a very good piece of characterisation."

Picture Show wrote: "Lily of the Alley is one of the sensations of the film year. It is shown from start to finish without a single subtitle, and yet it is perfectly easy to follow; it holds and thrills, and may well be considered a triumph for its producer, Henry Edwards. ...Chrissie White has the strongest part of her film career. Henry Edwards, lovable and virile, with his humorous twinkling eyes, his irresistible way that gets right at us, is at his very best in Lily of the Alley. Mary Brough is as delicious as ever, and Frank Stanmore does excellent work."

The Bioscope wrote that Edwards' self-imposed restriction "leads to some rather far-fetched ways of conveying simple ideas."

The Times considered that the film was still "an intrinsically absorbing drama, coherently presented."

== See also ==
- List of lost films
