= Old St. Paul's (film) =

- Directed by: Wilfred Noy
- Written by: Harrison Ainsworth (novel); Low Warren
- Starring: Lionelle Howard; P.G. Ebbutt
- Production company: Clarendon Films
- Distributed by: Clarendon Films
- Release date: February 1914
- Country: United Kingdom
- Languages: Silent; English intertitles

Old St. Paul's is a 1914 British silent historical film directed by Wilfred Noy and starring Lionelle Howard, R. Juden and P.G. Ebbutt. It is based on the 1841 novel Old St. Paul's by Harrison Ainsworth. The film is set in London at the time of the Great Fire, and depicts king Charles II of England.

== Cast ==
- Lionelle Howard as Leonard Holt
- R. Juden as Annabel
- P.G. Ebbutt as King Charles
- J. Cooper as Solomon Eagle
- Ivan Cleveland as Earl of Rochester
- Maud Sinclair as Nurse Malmayne
- F.J.J. Hart as Chowles
- Cyril Smith as Boy

== Bibliography ==
- Low, Rachael. The History of British Film, Volume III: 1914-1918. Routledge, 1997.
