= The Vicar of Wakefield (1913 film) =

- Directed by: Frank Wilson
- Written by: Oliver Goldsmith (novel); Blanche McIntosh
- Starring: Chrissie White; Violet Hopson; Harry Royston
- Production company: Hepworth Pictures
- Distributed by: Kinematograph Trading Company
- Release date: September 1913
- Running time: 3,275 feet
- Country: United Kingdom
- Languages: Silent; English intertitles

The Vicar of Wakefield is a 1913 British silent historical drama film directed by Frank Wilson and starring Violet Hopson, Harry Royston and Chrissie White. The film is an adaptation of the 1766 novel The Vicar of Wakefield by the Irish writer Oliver Goldsmith.

== Cast ==
- Violet Hopson as Olivia Primrose
- Harry Royston as Richard Thornhill
- Warwick Buckland as Dr Charles Primrose
- Chrissie White as Sophia Primrose
- Harry Gilbey as Sir William Thornhill
- Marie de Solla as Mrs Primrose
- Jack Raymond as Moses Primrose
- Harry Buss as Jenkinson
- John MacAndrews as Minister

== Bibliography ==
- Palmer, Scott. British Film Actors' Credits, 1895-1987. McFarland, 1988.
