= The Nature of the Beast (1919 film) =

- Directed by: Cecil M. Hepworth
- Written by: E. Temple Thurston
- Produced by: Cecil M. Hepworth
- Starring: Alma Taylor; Gerald Ames; James Carew
- Production company: Hepworth Pictures
- Distributed by: Butcher's Film Service
- Release date: June 1919
- Country: United Kingdom
- Languages: Silent; English intertitles

The Nature of the Beast is a 1919 British silent drama film directed by Cecil M. Hepworth and starring Alma Taylor, Gerald Ames and James Carew. The screenplay concerns a Belgian refugee who marries a British aircraft manufacturer. It was based on a 1918 novel of the same title by E. Temple Thurston.

== Plot summary ==
During the First World War, a Belgian refugee marries a British aircraft manufacturer, but a former German enemy tries to force her to give over secret documents.

== Cast ==
- Alma Taylor as Anna de Berghem
- Gerald Ames as John Ingledew
- James Carew as Kleinenberger
- Gwynne Herbert as Mrs. de Berghem
- Stephen Ewart as Sir James Standish
- Mary Dibley as Lady Standish
- Victor Prout as Mr. de Berghem
- Christine Rayner as Guest
- John MacAndrews as Friend

== Bibliography ==
- Palmer, Scott. British Film Actors' Credits, 1895-1987. McFarland, 1988.
