= The House of Marney =

1926 film

- Directed by: Cecil M. Hepworth
- Written by: Harry Hughes
- Based on: The House of Marney by John Goodwin
- Produced by: Archibald Nettlefold
- Starring: Alma Taylor; John Longden; James Carew
- Cinematography: Jack E. Cox
- Production company: Nettlefold Films
- Distributed by: Allied Artists Corporation
- Release date: 4 April 1927
- Running time: 73 minutes
- Country: United Kingdom
- Languages: Silent; English intertitles

The House of Marney is a 1927 British silent crime film directed by Cecil Hepworth and starring Alma Taylor, John Longden and James Carew. It was based on a novel by John Goodwin (a pseudonym for Sydney Gowing), which was in turn based on a serial called "Dave the Barge-Boy", originally written by the author for the story paper The Boys' Realm in 1906.

== Plot ==
An Essex sailor helps save a girl's heir from his crooked uncle.

== Cast ==
- Alma Taylor as Beatrice Maxon
- John Longden as Richard
- James Carew as Piers Marney
- Patrick Susands as Stephen Marney
- Gibb McLaughlin as Ezra
- Cameron Carr as Madd Matt
- Stephen Ewart as Gerald Maxon
- John MacAndrews as Puggy
