= The Lunatic at Large (1921 film) =

1921 film

- Directed by: Henry Edwards
- Written by: George Dewhurst
- Based on: The Lunatic at Large by J. Storer Clouston
- Produced by: Cecil M. Hepworth
- Starring: Henry Edwards; Chrissie White; Gwynne Herbert
- Production company: Hepworth Pictures
- Distributed by: Hepworth Pictures
- Release date: March 1921
- Running time: 5,800 feet
- Country: United Kingdom
- Languages: Silent; English intertitles

The Lunatic at Large is a 1921 British silent comedy film directed by Henry Edwards and starring Edwards, Chrissie White and Gwynne Herbert. The screenplay concerns an aristocratic matron who attempts to arrange a suitable marriage for her daughter. It is based on the novel of the same title by J. Storer Clouston. It was remade as a 1927 American film of the same title.

== Cast ==
- Henry Edwards as Mandell Essington
- Chrissie White as Lady Irene
- Lyell Johnstone as Baron Gauche
- Gwynne Herbert as Countess Coyley
- George Dewhurst as Dr. Welsh
- Hugh Clifton as Dr. Twiddell
- James Annand as Dr. Congleton
- P.K. Esdaile as Dr. Watson
- Buena Bent as Lady Alicia a Fyre
- John MacAndrews as Attendant

== Bibliography ==
- Low, Rachael. History of the British Film, 1918-1929. George Allen & Unwin, 1971.
