= The Call of the Sea (1930 film) =

1930 British film by Leslie S Hiscott

- Trade show advertisement
- Directed by: Leslie S. Hiscott
- Written by: H. Fowler Mear; Frank Shaw
- Produced by: Henry Edwards; Julius Hagen
- Starring: Henry Edwards; Chrissie White; Bernard Nedell
- Distributed by: Warner Bros. Pictures
- Release date: 19 November 1930
- Running time: 65 minutes
- Country: United Kingdom
- Language: English

The Call of the Sea is a 1930 British adventure film directed by Leslie S Hiscott. and starring Henry Edwards, Chrissie White and Bernard Nedel. It was written by H. Fowler Mear and Frank Shaw.

== Plot ==
Lieutenant Dickie Good visits his ex-sweetheart Iris Tares, now married to the deputy governor of Pablo Island. Good sees that she is being ill-treated by her husband, Ramon, and that he is operating a secret platinum mine with kidnapped naval officers. He alerts the authorities, frees the enslaved workers, and, after the death of Ramon, gets back together with Iris.

== Cast ==
- Henry Edwards as Lieutenant Commander Good
- Chrissie White as Iris Tares
- Bernard Nedell as Ramon Tares
- Chili Bouchier as Poquita
- Clifford McLaglen as Pedro
- Alexander Field as Hooky Walker
- James Fenton as Newton

== Reception ==
Film Weekly wrote: "In this film Henry Edwards and Chrissie White enter the talkie field. ...An ingenuous film this, but quile enjoyable."

Kine Weekly wrote: "God old-fashioned robust naval melodrama which, although unpretentious, is well mounted and excellently recorded. ... The fact that this drama unfolds according to formula does not detract in any way from the quality of the entertainment which is essentially popular in its appeal. There is plenty of action, a pleasing love interest, and a quiet vein of humour. Altogether a clean, refreshing feature." kin

The Daily Film Renter wrote: "Dramatic side not too convincing, but acting generally adequate, and sound exceptionally good."
