= Eileen Dennes =

Irish-born actress (1898–1991)

- Born: 1 February 1898; Dublin, Ireland
- Died: 22 January 1991 (aged 92); Hungerford, Berkshire, England, United Kingdom
- Occupation: Actress

Eileen Dennes (1 February 1898 – 22 January 1991) was an Irish-born actress of the silent era.

== Early life and career ==
Eileen Dennes was born Eileen Amhurst Cowen on 1 February 1898 in Dublin, Ireland, to Annie Kemp (née Dawson) and William Amherst Daniel Cowen.

She began on the stage in the early 1910s. After travelling to Hollywood in 1917, she found work at the Empire All Star Film Company and was offered the role of Ethel Fielding in her first film The Unforeseen (1917) alongside Olive Tell. She made one more film in Hollywood with Tell that year titled Her Sister.

Dennes then decided to find work in England; it was there that Cecil Hepworth offered her a contract and, in 1919, she appeared in her first English film as Bessie Saxton in Sheba starring Alma Taylor. She was later given the chance at starring roles in films such as Once Aboard the Lugger (1920), Mr. Justice Raffles (1921), and, once again with Alma Taylor, The Pipes of Pan (1923).

The final film that she worked on with Hepworth was Comin' Thro the Rye in 1923. She then worked with Fred LeRoy Granville a year later in his film The Sins Ye Do. Dennes' last film appearance was in 1925 as Lucy in The Squire of Long Hadley, appearing alongside Brian Aherne.

Dennes died 22 January 1991 in Hungerford, Berkshire, at the age of 92.

== Selected filmography ==
Year	Title	Role	Notes
1917	The Unforeseen	Ethel Fielding	
1917	Her Sister	Jane Alderson	
1919	Sheba	Bessie Saxton	
1919	The Forest on the Hill	Audrey Leaman	
1920	Alf's Button	Lady Isobel Fitzpeter	
1920	Once Aboard the Lugger	Mary Humfray	
1920	John Forrest Finds Himself	The Pet	
1920	Mrs. Erricker's Reputation	Lady Lettice Erricker	
1920	Great Snakes		
1921	The Tinted Venus	Bella Parkinson	
1921	Wild Heather	Dolly	
1921	Tansy	Vicar's Daughter	
1921	Mr. Justice Raffles	Camilla Belsize	
1921	Tit for Tat	Clove	
1923	The Pipes of Pan	Enid Markham	
1923	Strangling Threads	Miss Debb	
1923	Comin' Thro the Rye	Sylvia Fleming	
1924	The Sins Ye Do	Lady Eslin	
1924	Peeps into Puzzleland	Mother	Short film
1924	A Dear Liar		Short film
1925	The Squire of Long Hadley	Lucy	
