= The Amazing Quest of Mr. Ernest Bliss =

- Directed by: Henry Edwards
- Written by: E. Phillips Oppenheim
- Starring: Henry Edwards
- Production company: Hepworth Pictures
- Distributed by: Imperial
- Release date: 1920
- Country: United Kingdom
- Languages: Silent; English intertitles

The Amazing Quest of Mr. Ernest Bliss is a 1920 British silent comedy film directed by and starring Henry Edwards. As of August 2010, the film is listed as one of the British Film Institute's "75 Most Wanted" lost films. The film was remade in 1936 starring Cary Grant.

== Cast ==
- Henry Edwards as Ernest Bliss
- Chrissie White as Frances Clayton
- Gerald Ames as Dorrington
- Mary Dibley as Kate Brent
- Reginald Bach as Jack Brent
- Henry Vibart as Sir James Alroyd
- Douglas Munro as John Masters
- Mary Brough as Gloria Mott
- John Turnbull as Willie Mott (as Stanley Turnbull)
- Gerard Hillier as Dick Honerton
- Gerald Annand as Crawley
- Esme Hubbard as Mrs. Heath
- James McWilliams as Clowes
- Ernest Milton as Mr. Montague
- John R. Allan as Sam Brownley

== See also ==
- List of lost films
