= Boundary House =

1918 British film by Cecil M. Hepworth

- Directed by: Cecil M. Hepworth
- Written by: Peggy Webling (novel)
- Produced by: Cecil M. Hepworth
- Starring: Alma Taylor; Gerald Ames; William Felton
- Cinematography: Cecil M. Hepworth
- Production company: Hepworth Pictures
- Distributed by: Moss Films
- Release date: December 1918
- Country: United Kingdom
- Languages: Silent; English intertitles

Boundary House is a 1918 British silent drama film directed by Cecil M. Hepworth and starring Alma Taylor, Gerald Ames and William Felton.

== Plot ==
A man forces a woman to pose as his dead wife, who was her doppelganger.

== Cast ==
- Alma Taylor as Jenny Gay
- Gerald Ames as Cherry Ricardo
- William Felton as Old Fob
- Victor Prout as Henry Gay
- John MacAndrews as Ricardo
- Gwynne Herbert as Miss Gay

== Bibliography ==
- Palmer, Scott. British Film Actors' Credits, 1895-1987. McFarland, 1988.
