= Profit and the Loss =

1917 film

- Directed by: A. V. Bramble; Eliot Stannard
- Written by: H. F. Maltby (play)
- Starring: James Carew; Randle Ayrton; Saba Raleigh
- Production company: Ideal Film Company
- Distributed by: Ideal Film Company
- Release date: 19 March 1917
- Running time: 5 reels
- Country: United Kingdom
- Language: English

Profit and the Loss is a 1917 British silent drama film directed by A. V. Bramble and Eliot Stannard and starring James Carew, Randle Ayrton and Margaret Halstan.

It adapts a play (Profit - and the Loss) by H.F. Maltby.

== Plot ==
When friends fail him, a tenant farmer turns to making money.

== Cast ==
- James Carew - Dicky Bransome
- Randle Ayrton - Jenkins
- Margaret Halstan
- Saba Raleigh

== Bibliography ==
- Low, Rachael. The History of British Film, Volume 4 1918-1929. Routledge, 1997.
