= Tit for Tat (1921 film) =

1921 film

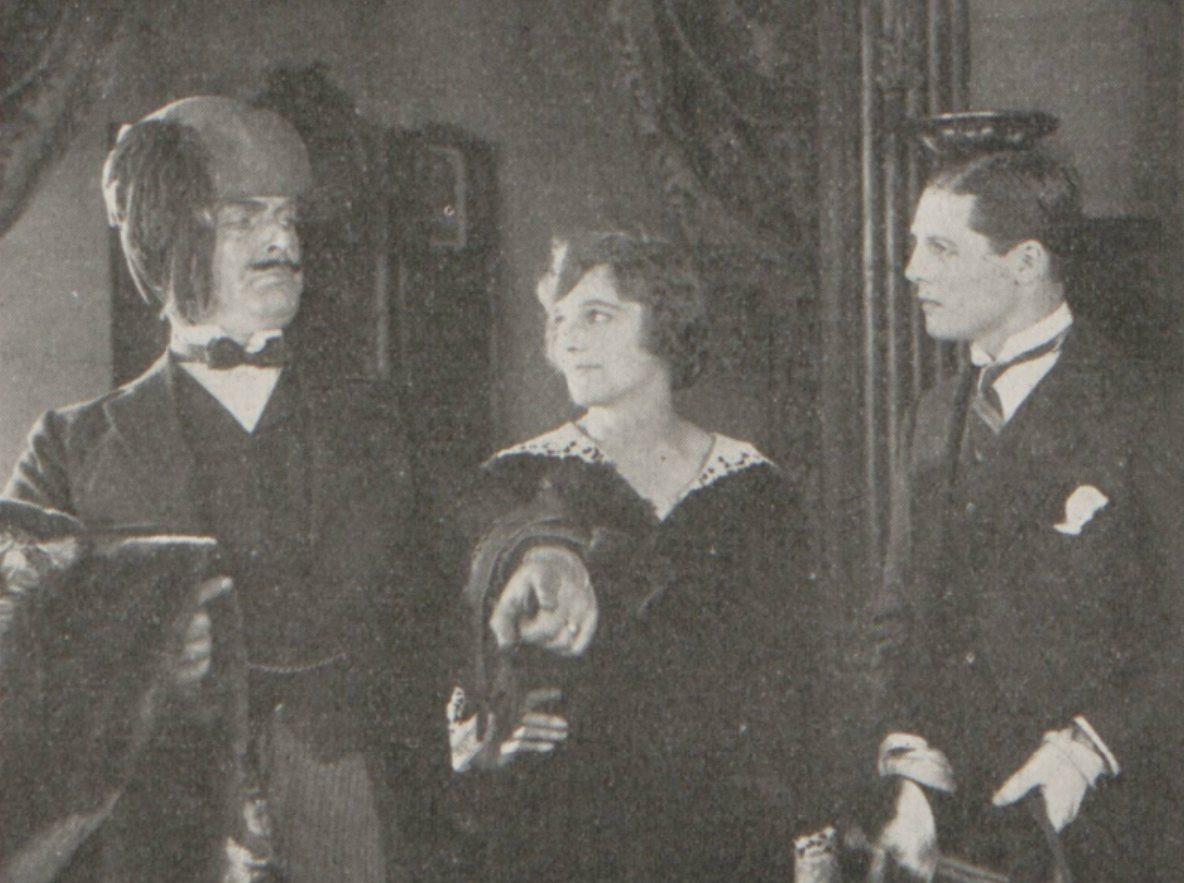
- Directed by: Henry Edwards
- Written by: Henry Edwards; Jessie Robertson
- Produced by: Henry Edwards
- Starring: Henry Edwards; Chrissie White; Eileen Dennes
- Production company: Hepworth Pictures
- Distributed by: Hepworth Pictures
- Release date: August 1922
- Country: United Kingdom
- Languages: Silent; English intertitles

Tit for Tat is a 1921 British silent comedy film directed by Henry Edwards and starring Edwards, Chrissie White and Eileen Dennes.

== Cast ==
- Henry Edwards as Roger
- Chrissie White as Peggy Smith
- Eileen Dennes as Clove
- Gwynne Herbert as Auntie
- Christine Rayner as Cousin Muriel
- Annie Esmond as Mrs. Speedwell
- Mary Brough as Gladys Mary Slatterly

== Bibliography ==
- Parish, James Robert. Film Actors Guide. Scarecrow Press, 1977.
