= Merely Mrs. Stubbs =

1917 film by Henry Edwards

Merely Mrs. Stubbs is a 1917 British silent drama film directed by Henry Edwards and starring Edwards, Alma Taylor and Lionelle Howard.

== Cast ==
- Henry Edwards as Joe Stubbs
- Alma Taylor as Edith Dudley
- Lionelle Howard as Sidney Dudley
- Mary Rorke as Mrs. Stubbs
- Ruth Mackay as Mrs. Quiltuck
- Charles Vane as Grandfather
- Fred Johnson as Ingram
- W.G. Saunders as Solicitor
- Molly Hamley-Clifford as Woman
