= Hugh Clifton =

English actor

Hugh Clifton was an English actor of the silent era born in London.

== Selected filmography ==
- John Forrest Finds Himself (1920)
- Mr. Justice Raffles (1921)
- Tansy (1921)
- The Narrow Valley (1921)
- Dollars in Surrey (1921)
- The Lunatic at Large (1921)
- The Tinted Venus (1921)
- Simple Simon (1922)
