= Sheba (film) =

- Directed by: Cecil M. Hepworth
- Written by: Rita (novel); Blanche McIntosh
- Starring: Alma Taylor; Gerald Ames; James Carew
- Production company: Hepworth Pictures
- Distributed by: Butcher's Film Service
- Release date: October 1919
- Country: United Kingdom
- Languages: Silent; English intertitles

Sheba is a 1919 British silent drama film directed by Cecil M. Hepworth and starring Alma Taylor, Gerald Ames and James Carew. The film is notable for an early appearance of Ronald Colman in a small part. It was made by Hepworth Pictures at Walton Studios.

== Cast ==
- Alma Taylor as Sheba Ormatroyd
- Gerald Ames as Paul Meredith
- James Carew as Levison
- Lionelle Howard as Count Pharamend
- Eileen Dennes as Bessie Saxton
- Mary Dibley as Rhoda Meredith
- Diana Carey as Mrs. Ormatroyd
- Eric Barker as Rex Ormatroyd
- Jacky Craine as Baby Paul
- Ronald Colman in a bit part

== Bibliography ==
- Goble, Alan. The Complete Index to Literary Sources in Film. Walter de Gruyter, 1999.
