= Strangling Threads =

1923 film

- Directed by: Cecil M. Hepworth
- Starring: Alma Taylor; Campbell Gullan; James Carew
- Production company: Hepworth Picture Plays
- Distributed by: Ideal Films
- Release date: August 1923
- Country: United Kingdom
- Languages: Silent; English intertitles

Strangling Threads is a 1923 British silent drama film directed by Cecil M. Hepworth and starring Alma Taylor, Campbell Gullan and James Carew.

== Plot ==
A millionaire is being blackmailed by his Mexican wife. He strangles her, and believes he has killed her. However, she actually died of shock.

== Cast ==
- Alma Taylor as Irma Brian
- Campbell Gullan as Martin Forsdyke KC
- James Carew as Stephen Mallard
- Mary Dibley as Dolorosa
- Eileen Dennes as Miss Debb
- Gwynne Herbert as Mrs. Brian
- John MacAndrews as Inspector Beall
- Maud Cressall as Coroner's Wife
- Louis Goodrich as Coroner
- Lyell Johnstone

== Distribution ==
Distributed by Ideal, the film was released in British cinemas in August 1923.

It is believed to have been destroyed in 1924 along with most of Hepworth's other films. The producer, in serious financial difficulty, thought that this would at least allow him to recover the silver from the nitrate in the films.

== Bibliography ==
- Quinlan, David. The Illustrated Who's Who in British Films. B.T. Batsford, 1978.
