= Nearer My God to Thee (film) =

- Directed by: Cecil M. Hepworth
- Written by: Herbert Pemberton
- Produced by: Cecil M. Hepworth
- Starring: Henry Edwards; Alma Taylor; A.V. Bramble
- Production company: Hepworth Pictures
- Distributed by: Moss Films
- Release date: November 1917
- Country: United Kingdom
- Language: Silent (English intertitles)

Nearer My God to Thee is a 1917 British silent drama film directed by Cecil M. Hepworth and starring Henry Edwards, Alma Taylor and A.V. Bramble. It is not known whether the film currently survives.

== Plot ==
As described in a film magazine, a hunchback is employed as an organist at an Episcopal church and at other times works as a school teacher. In the latter work he is associated with a young woman, with whom he is very infatuated. A London man of sporting tendencies quickly wins over the woman with his polished manners and ardent courtship and he marries her. After the wedding the husband goes back to the ways of his bachelorhood, frequenting the public places and spending his time in one prolonged debauch. The bride tends a store from which they derive their livelihood. The husband mistreats and abuses her. In the end, circumstances straighten themselves out with her marrying the hunchback, whose love never faltered.

== Cast ==
- Henry Edwards as John Drayton
- Alma Taylor as Joan
- A.V. Bramble as Jim Boden
- Teddy Taylor as Alec
- Beryl Rhodes as Littlest Girl
- John MacAndrews

== Bibliography ==
- Palmer, Scott. British Film Actors' Credits, 1895-1987. McFarland, 1988.
