= Helen of Four Gates =

1920 film

- Alma Taylor screenshot
- Directed by: Cecil Hepworth
- Written by: Ethel Carnie Holdsworth (novel)
- Starring: Alma Taylor; James Carew; Gerald Ames
- Production company: Hepworth Picture Plays
- Release date: September 1920
- Running time: 64 minutes
- Country: United Kingdom
- Language: Silent (English intertitles)

Helen of Four Gates is a 1920 British silent melodrama film directed by cinema pioneer Cecil Hepworth and starring Alma Taylor (in a dual role as mother and daughter), James Carew, and Gerald Ames.

== Production background ==
The film was adapted from a popular novel of the same name by Ethel Carnie Holdsworth and was shot on location on the Pennine moors around Heptonstall and Hebden Bridge, West Yorkshire, which Holdsworth had used as the setting for her novel. The film's intertitles were written in the original Yorkshire dialect of the novel.

For over 80 years Helen of Four Gates was believed to be irretrievably lost, until an original 35mm print was discovered in a film vault in Canada in 2007.

== Plot ==
Helen (Taylor) marries a young man who has poisoned her mind against her other suitor Abel Mason (Carew) by convincing her that there is hereditary madness in the Mason family. Within two years Helen's husband is dead and she is dying. She entrusts her baby daughter to Abel to bring up, as she has no family to call on. Abel agrees to take the baby, but Helen does not realise that it is out of desire to gain revenge on her for rejecting him rather than through any altruistic motive.

The baby (also called Helen) grows up believing Abel to be her father, and subject to his bullying and cruelty. As a young woman she meets Martin Scott (George Dewhurst), a student working as seasonal labour on a local farm. The pair fall in love, but Abel now tells Martin of the supposed madness in the Mason blood and Martin breaks off the engagement as a result. The despairing Helen tries without success to follow him over the moors. She is waylaid by Fielding Day (John MacAndrews), an itinerant acquaintance of Abel, who has entered into an agreement with Abel to marry Helen and make her as unhappy as possible, in return for a share in Abel's farm. Helen reluctantly agrees to the marriage as a means of stopping local gossip about how she was jilted by Martin.

A year passes and Helen finds herself trapped in a nightmare marriage while now also having to care for Abel, who has been paralysed by a stroke. She finally discovers that Abel is not her natural father, and in despair tries to drown herself but is rescued by a local farmer. At his home she finds Martin, who has returned to the area unable to forget her. They renew their courtship, but are seen together by Fielding, who beats Helen severely as punishment. Helen escapes from the house and takes flight with Martin onto the moors. Fielding pursues them and tries to shoot them, but is prevented from doing so by a local farm worker who has witnessed the scene and harbours a previous grudge against Fielding. A struggle ensues, during which Fielding falls from a rock and breaks his neck. Helen determines to leave Abel alone to his fate, as she and Martin start to make plans for their future.

== Cast ==
- Alma Taylor as Helen
- James Carew as Abel Manson
- Gerald Ames as Hinson
- George Dewhurst as Martin Scott
- Gwynne Herbert as Mrs. Tripp
- John MacAndrews as Fielding Day

== Loss and rediscovery ==
On its release Helen of Four Gates was a big success both with cinemagoers and critics, with the evocative and brooding Pennine landscapes being particularly praised, and Taylor's status as the biggest female box-office draw in British cinema confirmed. At this time Hepworth's ambition was growing and he was taking risks, which in retrospect were deemed imprudent, to expand his studio set-up at Walton-on-Thames. By 1924 he had over-reached himself financially and, unable to meet the demands of creditors, was declared bankrupt. Administrators who were called in to wind up the company's affairs, and realise whatever assets they could, took the step of seizing all of Hepworth's film stock and melting it down to release its marketable silver nitrate content.

Almost all of Hepworth's feature film output of the 1910s and early 1920s has for many decades been assumed to be lost forever, but searches and appeals to cinema archive facilities and private collectors worldwide continue to be made, notably by the British Film Institute National Archive. In the case of Helen of Four Gates, this finally bore fruit in 2007 when an original print was found in the vaults of the Cinémathèque québécoise in Montreal. A clip and a panorama of stills were shown to an audience in Hebden Bridge in August 2008, the first known public screening of any of the material since the 1920s. The first showing of the entire film took place in June 2010, again in Hebden Bridge, followed by a screening by the BFI in London in August 2010. The print is now held in the BFI National Archive.

A critical evaluation of the film from a 21st-century perspective by Bryony Dixon notes: "Hepworth's penchant for the British picturesque and the location shooting and composition are the film's strongest points. The scenes on the hilltops are stunning, composed with receding skylines in deep focus in the best tradition of Victorian photography." However she also observes: "the film feels slightly old fashioned due to Hepworth's unusual editing style which had not followed what was by then the accepted standards of film grammar. The continuity is occasionally spoiled by Hepworth's refusal to cut on action...despite sterling efforts by Alma Taylor and particularly James Carew, the performers are left floundering and resort to a gestural melodramatic manner on occasions."

== See also ==
- List of rediscovered films
