= The Naked Man (1923 film) =

1923 film

- Directed by: Henry Edwards
- Written by: Henry Edwards
- Starring: Henry Edwards; Chrissie White; James Carew
- Production company: Hepworth Pictures
- Distributed by: Ideal Films
- Release date: November 1923
- Country: United Kingdom
- Languages: Silent; English intertitles

The Naked Man is a 1923 British silent comedy film directed by Henry Edwards and starring Henry Edwards, Chrissie White and James Carew. The film adapts a play by Tom Gallon, Felix Gets a Month.

== Plot ==
The heir to £500,000 must live for one month without assistance.

== Cast ==
- Henry Edwards as Felix Delaney
- Chrissie White as Ninette Monday
- James Carew as Anthony Mapletoft
- Maud Cressall as Evelyn Garland
- E. Holman Clark as Alderman Twentyman
- Frank Stanmore as Hopkins
- Gwynne Herbert as Mrs. Garland
- Henry Vibart as Mr. Janson
- Eric Maturin as Adrian Redwood
- Jean Cadell as Miss Linnett
- Stephen Ewart as Mr. Garland

== Reception ==
Female fans of Henry Edwards were reportedly "thrilled when he showed’off his body" in the film.

== Bibliography ==
- Parish, James Robert. Film Actors Guide. Scarecrow Press, 1977.
