= The Golden Pavement =

- Directed by: Cecil M. Hepworth
- Written by: Percy Manton
- Starring: Alma Taylor; Stewart Rome; Lionelle Howard
- Production company: Hepworth Pictures
- Distributed by: Hepworth Pictures
- Release date: October 1915
- Country: United Kingdom
- Languages: Silent; English intertitles

The Golden Pavement is a 1915 British silent drama film directed by Cecil M. Hepworth and starring Alma Taylor, Stewart Rome and Lionelle Howard.

== Cast ==
- Alma Taylor as Brenda Crayle
- Stewart Rome as Dennis
- Lionelle Howard as Martin Lestrange
- William Felton as The crook
- Henry Vibart as The nobleman

== Bibliography ==
- Palmer, Scott. British Film Actors' Credits, 1895-1987. McFarland, 1988.
