= The Bargain (1921 film) =

1921 British film by Henry Edwards

- Directed by: Henry Edwards
- Screenplay by: Henry Edwards
- Starring: Henry Edwards; Chrissie White; Rex McDougall
- Production company: Hepworth Pictures
- Release date: November 1921
- Country: United Kingdom
- Language: Silent

The Bargain is a 1921 British silent crime film directed by Henry Edwards and starring Edwards, Chrissie White and Rex McDougall. It was based on a play by Edward Irwin.

== Cast ==
- Henry Edwards as Dennis Trevor
- Chrissie White as Mary
- Rex McDougall as Dick Wentworth
- Mary Dibley as Bella Wentworth
- James Annand as Tamplin
- John Marlborough East as lout
- John MacAndrews as Murphy
- Henry Vibart as Grosvenor Wentworth
