= Esme Hubbard =

British actress (1880–1951)

Esme Hubbard (1880 – 12 April 1951) was a British actress of the silent era.

She was born Esme Woodbine Hubbard to British parents in Russia and died in Ealing, London in 1951 at age 71.

== Select filmography ==
- Caste (1915)
- His Dearest Possession (1919)
- Linked by Fate (1919)
- The Amazing Quest of Mr. Ernest Bliss (1920)
- Dollars in Surrey (1921)
- Simple Simon (1922)
- Mist in the Valley (1923)
