= Blanche McIntosh =

British screenwriter

- Occupation: Screenwriter
- Years active: 1913 - 1923 (film)

Blanche McIntosh or MacIntosh was a British screenwriter of the silent era. She worked for Cecil M. Hepworth's Hepworth Pictures, and was employed on films such as The American Heiress (1917).

== Selected filmography ==
- The Vicar of Wakefield (1913)
- The Heart of Midlothian (1914)
- The Nightbirds of London (1915)
- Trelawny of the Wells (1916)
- The American Heiress (1917)
- Sheba (1919)
- Mrs. Erricker's Reputation (1920)
- Anna the Adventuress (1920)
- The Tinted Venus (1921)
- Mr. Justice Raffles (1921)

== Bibliography ==
- Wintour, Barry. Britain and the Great War, 1914-1918: A Subject Bibliography of Some Selected Aspects. Greenengle publishing, 2014.
