= Broken in the Wars =

1919 British film by Cecil Hepworth

- Directed by: Cecil M. Hepworth
- Starring: Henry Edwards; Chrissie White; Alma Taylor; John Hodge
- Production company: Hepworth Picture Plays
- Release date: 1919
- Country: United Kingdom

Broken in the Wars is a 1919 British silent drama film directed by Cecil Hepworth and starring Henry Edwards, Chrissie White and Alma Taylor. The Pensions Minister John Hodge appeared in the film to promote the King's Fund, which supported recently demobilised ex-servicemen. The fund had been criticized by veterans' organisations on the grounds that it was a government backed charity providing relief that should have been provided by the state. The film attempts to assure audiences that the King's Fund is not a charity. A cobbler returning from the First World War is persuaded by his aristocratic former employer and the Pensions Minister to receive a grant that will enable him to open his own shop. It was made by Hepworth Picture Plays. The film is available to view online in the UK via the BFI Player

== Cast ==
- Henry Edwards as Joe
- Chrissie White as Mrs. Joe
- Alma Taylor as Lady Dorothea
- John Hodge as Himself
- Gerald Ames as Customer
- John MacAndrews as Customer

== Bibliography ==
- Bamford, Kenton. Distorted Images: British National Identity and Film in the 1920s. I.B. Tauris, 1999.
