= Sunken Rocks =

- Directed by: Cecil M. Hepworth
- Written by: E. Temple Thurston
- Produced by: Cecil M. Hepworth
- Starring: Alma Taylor; Gerald Ames; James Carew
- Production company: Hepworth Pictures
- Distributed by: Butcher's Film Service
- Release date: August 1919
- Country: United Kingdom
- Languages: Silent; English intertitles

Sunken Rocks is a 1919 British silent drama film directed by Cecil M. Hepworth and starring Alma Taylor, Gerald Ames and James Carew.

== Cast ==
- Alma Taylor as Evelyn Farrar
- Gerald Ames as Dr. Purnell
- James Carew as J.H. Farrar
- Nigel Playfair as Mr. Gurney
- John MacAndrews as Tramp
- Minnie Rayner as Cook

== Bibliography ==
- Palmer, Scott. British Film Actors' Credits, 1895-1987. McFarland, 1988.
