= The Nightbirds of London =

1915 film directed by Frank Wilson

- Directed by: Frank Wilson
- Written by: George R. Sims (play); Blanche McIntosh
- Starring: Chrissie White; Violet Hopson; Stewart Rome
- Production company: Hepworth Pictures
- Distributed by: Hepworth Pictures
- Release date: November 1915
- Country: United Kingdom
- Languages: Silent; English intertitles

The Nightbirds of London is a 1915 British silent crime film directed by Frank Wilson and starring Stewart Rome, Chrissie White and Violet Hopson. It was based on a play by George R. Sims, adapted for the screen by Blanche McIntosh.

It was released by Hepworth Pictures in November 1915.

== Cast ==
- Stewart Rome
- Chrissie White
- Violet Hopson
- Lionelle Howard
- William Felton
- John MacAndrews
- Henry Vibart
- Arthur Staples

== Bibliography ==
- Palmer, Scott. British Film Actors' Credits, 1895-1987. McFarland, 1988.
