= George Dewhurst (director) =

British actor and director (1889–1968)

George Dewhurst (1889 in Preston, Lancashire, England - 8 November 1968 in Tooting, London, England) was a British actor, screenwriter and film director. He directed several film versions of the play A Sister to Assist 'Er.

== Partial filmography ==
=== Screenwriter ===
- The Lunatic at Large (1921)
- The Narrow Valley (1921)
- Dollars in Surrey (1921)
- No Lady (1931)
- The Price of Wisdom (1935)
- Adventure Ltd. (1935)
- King of the Castle (1936)

=== Director ===
- The Live Wire (1917)
- A Great Coup (1919)
- The Homemaker (1919)
- The Uninvited Guest (1923)
- The Little Door Into the World (1923)
- What the Butler Saw (1924)
- Sweeney Todd (1926)
- Irish Destiny (1926)
- The Rising Generation (1928)

=== Actor ===
- The Woman Wins (1918)
- The Toilers (1919)
- The Tinted Venus (1921)
- Never Trouble Trouble (1931)
- Men Without Honour (1939)
- Deadlock (1943)
