= Her Marriage Lines =

- Directed by: Frank Wilson
- Written by: Edith Banks
- Starring: Chrissie White; Lionelle Howard; Stewart Rome
- Production company: Hepworth Pictures
- Distributed by: Harma Photoplays
- Release date: January 1917
- Country: United Kingdom
- Languages: Silent; English intertitles

Her Marriage Lines is a 1917 British silent crime film directed by Frank Wilson and starring Stewart Rome, Chrissie White and Violet Hopson.

== Cast ==
- Stewart Rome as Godfrey
- Chrissie White as Jean Neville
- Violet Hopson as Sybil Ransley
- Lionelle Howard as Stephen Maybridge
- Henry Vibart as Lord Ransly
- Florence Nelson as Lady Ransley
- Frank Wilson as Rev. Neville

== Bibliography ==
- Palmer, Scott. British Film Actors' Credits, 1895-1987. McFarland, 1988.
