= A Grain of Sand =

1917 film by Frank Wilson

A Grain of Sand is a British silent film of 1917. A drama, it was written by Victor Montefiore and directed by Frank Wilson. The film was produced by the Hepworth Manufacturing Company.

== Synopsis ==
A kitchen maid clears a Lady's gambling son when he is framed for forgery.

== Cast ==
- Howard Langton - Lionelle Howard
- Doris Kestevan, Langton's Fiancée - Chrissie White
- Dennis Grayle - Stewart Rome
- James Fordyce, a detective - William Felton
- Liza, The Grain of Sand - Ivy Millais
- Liza's father - John MacAndrews
