= James Carew =

American actor (1876–1938)

- Born: James Usselman; 5 February 1876; Goshen, Indiana, U.S.
- Died: 4 April 1938 (aged 62); London, England, UK
- Years active: 1897–1938
- Spouse: Ellen Terry (m. 1907; sep. 1910)

James Usselman (February 5, 1876 – April 4, 1938), known professionally as James Carew, was an American actor who appeared in many films, mainly in Britain. He was born in Goshen, Indiana in 1876 and began working as a clerk in a publishing firm. He began acting on stage in Chicago in 1897 in Damon and Pythias.

In 1905, Carew moved to England, where he continued his stage career starting with the Lyric Theatre, London, later working in two plays with Shakespearean actress Ellen Terry, one of the best-known and noted British actresses of the day. In 1907, he married Terry, who was thirty years his senior. The couple separated in 1910 but there is no record of divorce. In fact he is listed as living with Ellen at Smallhythe in the 1911 Census.

Carew made his screen debut by 1917, when he appeared in the film Profit and the Loss. He continued to take leading roles in films until his death in 1938.

== Filmography ==
- The Fool (1913)
- Justice (1917)
- Profit and the Loss (1917)
- Victory and Peace (1918)
- Spinner o' Dreams (1918)
- Sheba (1919)
- The Kinsman (1919)
- Sunken Rocks (1919)
- The Nature of the Beast (1919)
- 12.10 (1919)
- The Forest on the Hill (1919)
- Helen of Four Gates (1920)
- Alf's Button (1920)
- Anna the Adventuress (1920)
- Mrs. Erricker's Reputation (1920)
- The Narrow Valley (1921)
- Tansy (1921)
- Dollars in Surrey (1921)
- Wild Heather (1921)
- Mr. Justice Raffles (1921)
- Mist in the Valley (1923)
- Strangling Threads (1923)
- The Naked Man (1923)
- Comin' Thro the Rye (1923)
- The Love Story of Aliette Brunton (1924)
- Eugene Aram (1924)
- The Wine of Life (1924)
- Owd Bob (1924)
- Satan's Sister (1925)
- One Colombo Night (1926)
- The House of Marney (1926)
- Satan's Sister (1926)
- The King's Highway (1927)
- A Woman Redeemed (1927)
- One of the Best (1927)
- A Window in Piccadilly (1928)
- Love's Option (1928)
- The Lady of the Lake (1928)
- High Treason (1929)
- High Seas (1929)
- City of Play (1929)
- To Oblige a Lady (1931)
- Guilt (1931)
- Mischief (1931)
- Brother Alfred (1932)
- You Made Me Love You (1933)
- Mayfair Girl (1933)
- Freedom of the Seas (1934)
- Too Many Millions (1934)
- The Dictator (1935)
- Who's Your Father (1935)
- Royal Cavalcade (1935)
- The Mystery of the Mary Celeste (1935)
- The Tunnel (1935)
- All at Sea (1935)
- Come Out of the Pantry (1935)
- Oh, What a Night (1935)
- The Improper Duchess (1936)
- The Secret Voice (1936)
- Living Dangerously (1936)
- Spy of Napoleon (1936)
- Wings Over Africa (1936)
- David Livingstone (1936)
- You Must Get Married (1936)
- Treachery on the High Seas (1936)
- Murder at the Cabaret (1937)
- Midnight at Madame Tussaud's (1936)
- Strange Experiment (1937)
- Thunder in the City (1937)
- Knight Without Armour (1937)
- Rhythm Racketeer (1937)
- Jericho (1937)
- Glamour Girl (1938)
