= Kipps (1921 film) =

1921 film

- Directed by: Harold M. Shaw
- Written by: Frank Miller
- Based on: Kipps by H. G. Wells
- Starring: George K. Arthur; Edna Flugrath; Christine Rayner
- Cinematography: Silvano Balboni
- Production company: Stoll Pictures
- Distributed by: Stoll Pictures
- Release date: January 1921
- Running time: 82 minutes
- Country: United Kingdom
- Languages: Silent; English intertitles

Kipps is a 1921 British silent drama film directed by Harold M. Shaw and starring George K. Arthur, Edna Flugrath and Christine Rayner. It is an adaptation of the 1905 novel Kipps by H. G. Wells. It was made by Stoll Pictures, the largest film company in the British Isles at the time. The novel was subsequently remade into the 1941 sound film Kipps directed by Carol Reed.

== Synopsis ==
After losing his job in a Folkestone drapery, young Arthur Kipps inherits a considerable sum of money and has his head turned towards the well-bred Helen Walsingham and away from his childhood sweetheart Ann.

== Cast ==
- George K. Arthur as Arthur Kipps
- Edna Flugrath as Ann Pornick
- Christine Rayner as Helen Walsingham
- Teddy Arundell as Harry Chitterlow
- Norman Thorpe as Chester Coote
- Arthur Helmore as Shelford
- John Marlborough East as Old Kipps
- Annie Esmond as Old Kipps' Wife

== Bibliography ==
- Low, Rachael. The History of British Film, Volume 4 1918-1929. Routledge, 1997.
