= Stephen Ewart =

British actor (1869–1953)

- Postcard
- Born: 13 March 1869; Birmingham, Warwickshire, England
- Died: 1953 (aged 83 or 84); Middlesex, England
- Occupation: Actor

Stephen Ewart (born 13 March 1869 – died 1953) was a British actor who was also credited as Stephen T. Ewart. His stage work included playing Tristan l'Hermite in the original London production of The Vagabond King at the Winter Garden Theatre, in 1927.

== Selected filmography ==
- Possession (1919)
- The City of Beautiful Nonsense (1919)
- The Forest on the Hill (1919)
- The Nature of the Beast (1919)
- A Temporary Vagabond (1920)
- Boden's Boy (1923)
- The Naked Man (1923)
- The World of Wonderful Reality (1924)
- The House of Marney (1926)
- Three Men in a Boat (1933)
