= The City of Beautiful Nonsense (1919 film) =

1919 British film by Henry Edwards

City of Beautiful Nonsense
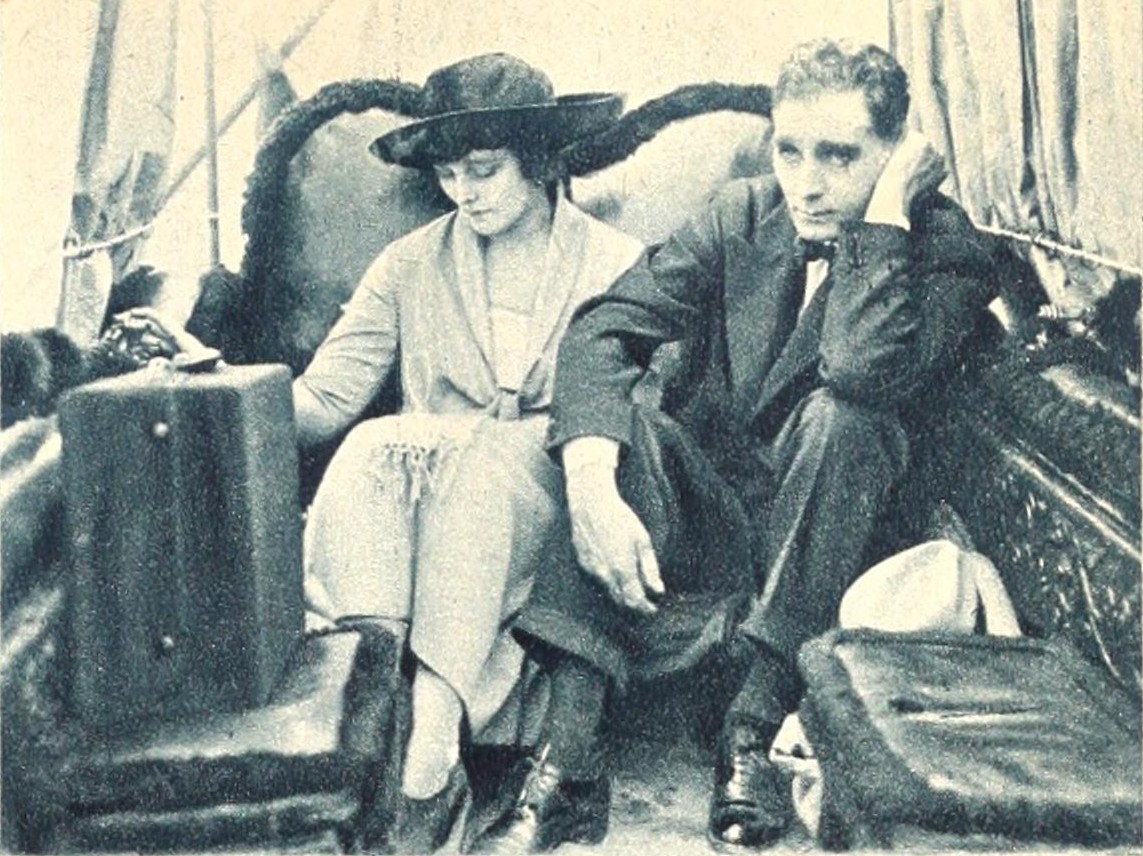
- Chrissie White and Henry Edwards
- Directed by: Henry Edwards
- Written by: E. Temple Thurston
- Produced by: Cecil Hepworth
- Starring: Chrissie White; Henry Edwards
- Production company: Hepworth Picture Plays
- Release date: 1919
- Country: United Kingdom
- Languages: Silent film English intertitles

City of Beautiful Nonsense is a 1919 British silent film drama directed by Henry Edwards, who also starred in the film with Chrissie White. The film is based on the best-selling 1909 novel of the same name by E. Temple Thurston, and is a tale of a woman intending to marry for financial gain and security, who realises at the last minute that to be true to herself and to have the prospect of a happy future she must instead marry for love. A sound version of the same story was made in 1935 by Adrian Brunel.

The film appears to have been well received and popular with audiences, and has been described as "the most talked about British film of 1919" and "technically on a par with the current Hollywood imports". A contemporary review in The Bioscope admired Edwards' "poetic embellishments" and "symbolistic touches".

== Cast ==
- Henry Edwards as John Grey
- Chrissie White as Jill Dealtry
- Henry Vibart as Thomas Grey
- Gwynne Herbert as Mrs. Grey
- James Lindsay as Skipworth
- Douglas Munro as Chesterton
- Stephen Ewart as Mr. Dealtry
- Teddy Taylor as Tommy Dealtry
