= Boden's Boy =

1923 British film by Henry Edwards

- Directed by: Henry Edwards
- Based on: A novel by Tom Gallon
- Starring: Henry Edwards; Chrissie White; Francis Lister
- Production company: Hepworth Pictures
- Release date: October 1923
- Country: United Kingdom
- Language: Silent

Boden's Boy is a 1923 British romance film directed by Henry Edwards and starring Edwards, Chrissie White, and Francis Lister. It was based on a novel by Tom Gallon.

== Cast ==
- Henry Edwards as Enery Boden
- Chrissie White as Barbara Pilgrim
- Francis Lister as David Wayne
- Henry Vibart as Flower
- Stephen Ewart as Christopher Pilgrim
- Judd Green as Swaddell
- Bob Russell as Tickner
