= The Live Wire (1917 film) =

- Directed by: George Dewhurst
- Written by: George Dewhurst
- Starring: Ronald Colman; Phyllis Titmuss
- Production company: Dewhurst Films
- Release date: 1917
- Running time: Two reels
- Country: United Kingdom
- Languages: Silent; English intertitles

The Live Wire is a 1917 British short silent comedy film directed by George Dewhurst and starring Ronald Colman and Phyllis Titmuss. It marked the screen debut of Colman, who would go on to become a leading Hollywood star. It is now a lost film.

== Bibliography ==
- Schildgen, Rachel A. More Than A Dream: Rediscovering the Life and Films of Vilma Banky. 1921 PVG Publishing, 2010.
