= Sweet Lavender (1915 film) =

- Directed by: Cecil M. Hepworth
- Written by: Arthur Wing Pinero (play)
- Starring: Henry Ainley; Chrissie White; Alma Taylor
- Production company: Hepworth Pictures
- Distributed by: Hepworth Pictures
- Release date: October 1915
- Running time: 5,000 feet
- Country: United Kingdom
- Languages: Silent; English intertitles

Sweet Lavender is a 1915 British silent romance film directed by Cecil M. Hepworth and starring Henry Ainley, Chrissie White and Alma Taylor. It is based on the 1888 play Sweet Lavender by Arthur Wing Pinero.

== Cast ==
- Henry Ainley as Dick Phenyl
- Chrissie White as Lavender
- Alma Taylor as Ruth Rolfe
- Stewart Rome as Geoffrey Wedderburn
- J.V. Bryant as Clement Hale
- Violet Hopson

== Bibliography ==
- Palmer, Scott. British Film Actors' Credits, 1895-1987. McFarland, 1988.
