= Mrs. Erricker's Reputation =

1920 film

- Directed by: Cecil M. Hepworth
- Written by: Thomas Cobb (novel); Blanche McIntosh
- Starring: Alma Taylor; Gerald Ames; James Carew
- Production company: Hepworth Company
- Distributed by: Hepworth Company
- Release date: 1 December 1920
- Country: United Kingdom
- Languages: Silent; English intertitles

Mrs. Erricker's Reputation is a 1920 British silent drama film directed by Cecil M. Hepworth and starring Alma Taylor, Gerald Ames and James Carew.

== Cast ==
- Alma Taylor as Georgiana Erricker
- Gerald Ames as Vincent Dampier
- James Carew as Sir Richard Erricker
- Eileen Dennes as Lady Lettice Erricker
- Gwynne Herbert as Lady Erricker

== Bibliography ==
- Palmer, Scott. British Film Actors' Credits, 1895-1987. McFarland, 1988.
