= The Admirable Crichton (1918 film) =

1918 British silent film by G. B. Samuelson

- Directed by: G. B. Samuelson
- Based on: The Admirable Crichton by J. M. Barrie
- Starring: Basil Gill Mary Dibley James Lindsay Lennox Pawle Lillian Hall-Davis
- Release date: 1918
- Country: United Kingdom
- Language: Silent (English intertitles)

The Admirable Crichton is a 1918 British silent comedy film directed by G. B. Samuelson and starring Basil Gill, Mary Dibley and James Lindsay. It was based on the 1902 play The Admirable Crichton by J. M. Barrie.

In 1919 it was filmed by Cecil B. DeMille as Male and Female starring Gloria Swanson.

== Premise ==
When they are stranded on a desert island, an aristocratic family fall increasingly under the sway of their charismatic, competent butler.

== Cast ==
- Basil Gill as Crichton
- Mary Dibley as Lady Mary Lasenby
- James Lindsay as Woolley
- Lennox Pawle as Lord Loam
- Lillian Hall-Davis as Lady Agatha Lasenby
