= The Tinted Venus =

1921 film

- Directed by: Cecil M. Hepworth
- Written by: Blanche McIntosh
- Starring: Alma Taylor; George Dewhurst; Maud Cressall
- Production company: Hepworth Picture Plays
- Distributed by: Hepworth Pictures
- Release date: April 1921
- Country: United Kingdom
- Languages: Silent; English intertitles

The Tinted Venus is a 1921 British silent fantasy film directed by Cecil Hepworth and starring Alma Taylor, George Dewhurst and Maud Cressall.

The Tinted Venus is based on the 1885 novella by F. Anstey (pseudonym of Thomas Anstey Guthrie), in which a statue of Venus becomes human and responds to social mores and repressed sexuality in Victorian England. The novella is also the basis for the 1941 stage musical fantasy, One Touch of Venus, by composer Kurt Weill, with book by S. J. Perelman and Ogden Nash, and lyrics by Nash. A 1948 film, One Touch of Venus, is based on Guthrie's book and the musical.

== Cast ==
- Alma Taylor as Matilda Collum
- George Dewhurst as Leander Tweddle
- Maud Cressall as Venus
- Eileen Dennes as Bella Parkinson
- Hugh Clifton as Jauncey
- Gwynne Herbert as Mrs. Collum
- Mary Brough as Landlady

== Bibliography ==
- Palmer, Scott. British Film Actors' Credits, 1895-1987. McFarland, 1988.
