= Stranglehold (1931 film) =

1931 film

- Allan Jeayes, Garry Marsh and Isobel Elsom in a scene from the film
- Directed by: Henry Edwards
- Written by: Henry Edwards
- Story by: Hugh G. Esse
- Produced by: Henry Edwards; E.G. Norman
- Starring: Isobel Elsom; Garry Marsh; Derrick De Marney
- Cinematography: Walter Blakeley
- Music by: John Greenwood
- Production company: Warner Brothers
- Distributed by: Warner Brothers
- Release date: October 1931
- Running time: 66 minutes
- Country: United Kingdom
- Language: English

Stranglehold is a lost 1931 British drama film directed by Henry Edwards and starring Isobel Elsom, Garry Marsh and Derrick De Marney. It was written by Edwards from a story by Hugh G. Esse, and made by Warner Brothers at Teddington Studios as a quota quickie.

== Preservation status ==
The British Film Institute has classed Stranglehold as a lost film. Its National Archive holds a collection of ephemera and stills but no film or video materials.

== Plot ==
King, discovering that his old school-friend Bruce has betrayed the only woman that he ever loved, takes revenge on Bruce and sabotages his life completely. Ultimately, King relialises that his revenge is valueless.

== Cast ==
- Isobel Elsom as Beatrice
- Garry Marsh as Bruce
- Derrick De Marney as Phillip
- Allan Jeayes as King
- Dorothy Bartlam as Grace
- Minnie Rayner as Cook
- Henry Vibart as Farren
- Hugh E. Wright as Briggs
- K. Takase as Ling

== Reception ==
Film Weekly wrote: "There is a really good dramatic idea at the base of this story, but the narration, and in most cases the acting, does not put it over with any real success. Takase and Garry Marsh are the best of a fair cast. Henry Edwards, in directing the film, seems to have found difficulty with material heavier than that to which he is accustomed."

Kine Weekly wrote: "This British melodrama of revenge is occasionally reminiscent of Mr. Wu, but it lacks its fine dramatic punch and good stagecraft. Scope and easy movement, the essential characteristics of this type of entertainment, are lacking, and the picture's appeal is limited to those who do not take their entertainment too seriously. Allan Jeayes plays the Anglo-Chinaman fairly well, but his performance is very reminiscent of George Arliss in The Green Goddess, and suffers in comparison. Garry Marsh interprets Bruce with powerful aggressiveness, but Isobel Elsom fails to reach the necessary emotional heights of Beatrice, nor does she photograph well. ... This meiodrama carries us back to the early days of British production, and suffers from its old faults. There is very little action, the story is artificial and highly melodramatic.'"

The Daily Film Renter wrote: "Far fetched story produced at Teddington Studios and directed by Henry Edwards. On the whole well cast, recorded and photographed, but falls short of feature rank by reason of flat and inconclusive climax."

Picturegoer wrote: "Highly artificial and melodramatic picture, somewhat on the lines of Mr. Wu, but lacking that play's strong dramatisation. ... The continuity runs jerkily and the production qualities generally are not remarkable."
