= Henryetta Edwards =

British actress (1926–2021)

- Born: Chrissie Henryetta Edwards; 1 January 1926; Chertsey, Surrey, England
- Died: 1 May 2021 (aged 95); England
- Occupation: Actress
- Parent(s): Henry Edwards and Chrissie White

Henryetta Edwards (1 January 1926 – 1 May 2021) was a British actress on the London stage, and in films and television, mostly in the 1940s and 1950s.

== Early life ==
Edwards was born in Chertsey, Surrey, the daughter of actors Henry Edwards and Chrissie White.

== Career ==
London stage roles for Edwards included parts in George Bernard Shaw's Pygmalion (1947), I Remember Mama (1948), Terrence Rattigan's The Browning Version and Harlequinade (original casts, 1948–1949), An Angel of No Importance (1949), The Trial (1950), Treasure Hunt (1950), The Attenborough Home (1953), Murder Story (1954), and Sailor Beware! (1955–1958).

Edwards appeared in the films Squibs (1935, directed by her father), She Shall Have Murder (1950), and The Feminine Touch (1956, a hospital drama from Ealing Studios; marketed as The Gentle Touch in the United States, and A Lamp is Heavy in Canada). She had roles in television adaptations of Lady from Edinburgh (1948), The Browning Version (1949), Harlequinade (1953), and Sailor Beware! (1956); she also appeared in "The Invisible Knife", an episode of the Boris Karloff series Colonel March of Scotland Yard (1955).

In 1956 she also appeared in an episode of Strange Experiences.

== Personal life ==
Edwards died in 2021, aged 95, in England. She never married.
