= Judd Green =

British actor (1866–1932)

Judd Green (also credited as R. Judd Green; 1866–1932) was a British film actor of the silent era. He was born in Portsmouth, Hampshire in 1866 and made his first screen appearance in 1914.

== Selected filmography ==
- The Third String (1914)
- Called Back (1914)
- Thelma (1918)
- The Wages of Sin (1918)
- The Life Story of David Lloyd George (1918)
- The Kinsman (1919)
- The Forest on the Hill (1919)
- The Lamp of Destiny (1919)
- A Smart Set (1919)
- When It Was Dark (1919)
- Little Dorrit (1920)
- The Tidal Wave (1920)
- The Amateur Gentleman (1920)
- Class and No Class (1921)
- A Master of Craft (1922)
- The Knight Errant (1922)
- Boden's Boy (1923)
- In the Blood (1923)
- The Stirrup Cup Sensation (1924)
- The Alley of Golden Hearts (1924)
- Three to One Against (1932)
- The Harbour Lights (1923)
- The Gold Cure (1925)
- Trainer and Temptress (1925)
- Nell Gwyn (1926)
- Shooting Stars (1927)
- Sweeney Todd (1928)
- What Money Can Buy (1928)
- Widecombe Fair (1928)
- The Bondman (1929)
- Escape from Dartmoor (1929)
