= Mary Dibley =

British actress

Mary Dibley (21 February 1883 in London – 11 September 1968) was a British film actress. She was married to the actor Gerald Ames.

== Selected filmography ==
- The Christian (1915)
- The Shulamite (1915)
- Sally in Our Alley (1916)
- Red Pottage (1918)
- The Romance of Old Bill (1918)
- The Admirable Crichton (1918)
- The Garden of Resurrection (1919)
- Sheba (1919)
- The Nature of the Beast (1919)
- The Amazing Quest of Mr. Ernest Bliss (1920)
- The Lure of Crooning Water (1920)
- The Autumn of Pride (1921)
- Mary Find the Gold (1921)
- The Bargain (1921)
- The Shadow of Evil (1921)
- The Card (1922)
- Simple Simon (1922)
- A Royal Divorce (1923)
- Strangling Threads (1923)
- The Unwanted (1924)
- The Blue Peter (1928)
- A South Sea Bubble (1928)
- His House in Order (1928)
- The Hellcat (1928)
