= The World of Wonderful Reality =

1924 lost film

The World of Wonderful Reality is a 1924 British lost silent romance film directed by Henry Edwards and starring Edwards, Chrissie White, and James Lindsay. It was based on a story by E. Temple Thurston.

== Cast ==
- Henry Edwards as John Gray
- Chrissie White as Jill Dealtry
- James Lindsay as Skipworth
- Henry Vibart as Thomas Grey
- Gwynne Herbert as Mrs. Grey
- Stephen Ewart as Mr. Dealtry
- Violet Elliott as Mrs. Dealtry

== See also ==
- List of lost films
