= The Kinsman =

1919 film

The Kinsman is a 1919 British silent comedy film directed by Henry Edwards and starring Edwards, James Carew and Chrissie White.

== Plot summary ==
A cockney clerk switches places with an aristocrat to whom he is identical.

== Cast ==
- Henry Edwards - Bert Gammage/Roger Blois
- James Carew - Col. Blois
- Chrissie White - Pamela Blois
- Christine Rayner - Julie
- Gwynne Herbert - Mrs. Blois
- Victor Prout - Col. Lorraine
- John MacAndrews - Dobbs
- Judd Green - Dr. Sprott
- Marie Wright - Duchess
- Bob Russell - Footman
