= Simple Simon (1922 film) =

1922 film

Simple Simon is a 1922 British romance film directed by Henry Edwards and starring Edwards, Chrissie White and Mary Dibley. A cynical journalist attempts to seclude a naive monk, but he is rescued by a beautiful village girl.

== Cast ==
- Henry Edwards - Simon
- Chrissie White - Rosemary Ruth
- Mary Dibley - Sylvia Royal
- Hugh Clifton - Mark
- Henry Vibart - Abbot
- Esme Hubbard - Minty Weir
- E.C. Matthews - Adam Spice
