= Possession (1919 film) =

1919 film by Henry Edwards

Possession is a 1919 British silent romance film directed by Henry Edwards and starring Edwards, Chrissie White and Gerald Ames. It is an adaptation of the 1897 novel Phroso: A Romance by Anthony Hope.

== Cast ==
- Henry Edwards - Blaise Barewsky
- Chrissie White - Valerie Sarton
- Gerald Ames - Richard Staire
- Gwynne Herbert - Tante
- Stephen Ewart - John Sarton
- Annie Esmond - Marquise
- Bubbles Brown - Valerie, as a child
