= Doorsteps =

1916 British film by Henry Edwards

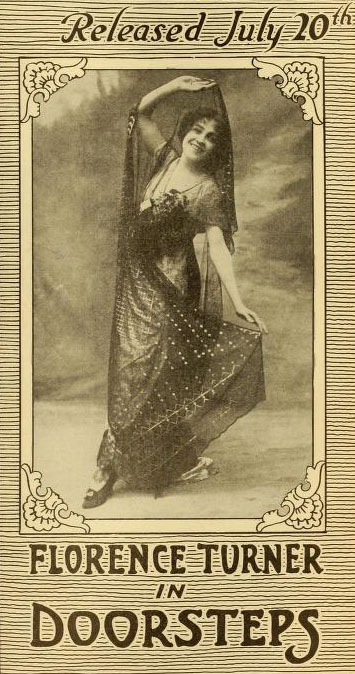
Advertisement (1916)

Doorsteps is a 1916 British silent drama film directed by Henry Edwards and starring Edwards, Florence Turner and Campbell Gullan.

== Plot ==
Its plot involves a boarding housemaid who befriends a playwright and helps him to evade a dangerous ex-convict on his tail. It was based on a play by Edwards, and was made as a short feature film with a running time of four reels.

== Cast ==
- Florence Turner — Doorsteps
- Henry Edwards — George Newlands
- Campbell Gullan — Tozer
- Amy Lorraine — Mrs. Skipps
- Fred Rains — Stage-manager
