= John Forrest Finds Himself =

1920 film

- Release date: 1920
- Country: United Kingdom

John Forrest Finds Himself is a 1920 British silent romance film directed by Henry Edwards and starring Edwards, Chrissie White and Gerald Ames.

== Cast ==
- Henry Edwards - John Forrest
- Chrissie White - Joan Grey
- Gerald Ames - Ezra Blott
- Hugh Clifton - O'Reilly
- Gwynne Herbert - Mrs. Forrest
- Henry Vibart - Mr. Forrest
- Mary Brough - Biddy
- Eileen Dennes - The Pet
- John MacAndrews - Carter Joe
- Victor Prout - Stephen Grey
- John Deverell - Hon, Vere Blair
- Marion Dyer - Sylvia Grey
