= The Failure (1917 film) =

1917 film by Henry Edwards

The Failure is a 1917 British silent crime film directed by Henry Edwards and starring Edwards, Chrissie White and Lionelle Howard.

== Plot ==
A Frenchman deceives a man into drinking poison owned by his brother. He then frames the brother for the murder.

== Cast ==
- Henry Edwards - Dick Carson
- Chrissie White - Margaret Gilder
- Lionelle Howard - Sidney Carson
- Fred Johnson - Gustave le Sage
- Charles Vane - Police Chief
- W.G. Saunders - Mr. Gilder
