= Christine Rayner =

British actress

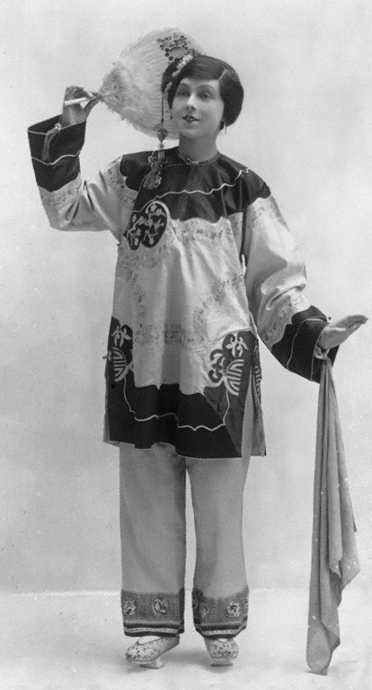
Christine Rayner in 1913

Christine Rayner (born 21 October 1888 — 26 September 1973) was a British actress of the silent era.

She was born 21 October 1888 in Holborn, London and died in Exmouth, Devon on 26 September 1973 in Exmouth, Devon at age 84.

== Selected filmography ==
| Year | Title | Role | Notes |
|---|---|---|---|
| 1914 | She Stoops to Conquer | Constance Neville | |
| 1915 | The Christian | Polly Love | |
| 1916 | Sally Bishop | Miss Standish Rowe | |
| 1916 | His Daughter's Dilemma | Rose Twining | |
| 1919 | The Nature of the Beast | Guest | |
| 1919 | The Kinsman | Julie | |
| 1921 | Tit for Tat | Cousin Muriel | |
| 1921 | Kipps | Helen Walsingham | |
| 1923 | Comin' Thro the Rye | Jane Peach | |
