= Mist in the Valley =

1923 film

Mist in the Valley is a 1923 British silent crime film directed by Cecil Hepworth and starring Alma Taylor, G. H. Mulcaster and James Carew. It was based on a novel by Dorin Craig.

== Plot ==
An ex-nun marries a man who has amnesia. Her life takes a dark turn when her uncle, who had posed as her father, tries to take control of her fortune. The uncle ends up dead, and she is falsely accused of murdering him. She must prove her innocence and uncover the truth behind her uncle's schemes.

== Cast ==
- Alma Taylor - Margaret Yeoland
- G. H. Mulcaster - Denis Marlow
- James Carew - Justin Courtney
- Esme Hubbard - Nurse Merrion
- John MacAndrews - Job Pennyquick
- Gwynne Herbert - Mrs. Grick
- Maud Cressall - Mother Superior
- Charles Vane - Squire Yeoland
- Douglas Munro - Prosecution
- Lionel d'Aragon - Defence
- Bertram Terry - Mr. Moon
- Fred Rains - Mr. Warren
