= The Forest on the Hill =

1919 film

The Forest on the Hill is a 1919 British silent crime film directed by Cecil Hepworth and starring Alma Taylor, James Carew and Gerald Ames. It was based on a novel by Eden Phillpotts.

== Cast ==
- Alma Taylor - Drusilla Whyddon
- James Carew - Timothy Snow
- Gerald Ames - John Redstone
- Lionelle Howard - Frederick Moyle
- Eileen Dennes - Audrey Leaman
- Gwynne Herbert - Mrs. Snow
- Stephen Ewart - Lord Champernowne
- John MacAndrews - Mr. Leaman
- Judd Green - Lot Snow
