= National War Aims Committee =

British propaganda agency (1917–1918)

Agency overview
- Formed: 4 August 1917
- Preceding agencies: Central Committee for National Patriotic Organization; Parliamentary Recruiting Committee
- Dissolved: November 1918
- Ministers responsible: David Lloyd George, Prime Minister of the United Kingdom; Freddie Guest, Committee Chairman; William Sutherland, Committee Vice-Chairman
- Agency executive: Lord Beaverbrook, Minister of Information After 1918
- Parent department: Parliament of the United Kingdom

The National War Aims Committee (NWAC), sometimes known as the Guest Committee, was a propaganda organization established by the Parliament of the United Kingdom during World War I, working alongside the War Office and Wellington House. Its purpose was to sustain public morale and support for the war by distributing patriotic information and countering the growth of pacifist sentiment in urban areas. NWAC coordinated its activities through a network of local War Aims Committees, or WACs. Its primary activities involved producing large quantities of propaganda and sponsoring hundreds of local meetings where patriotic speakers aimed to reignite public enthusiasm for the war effort. While its methods, including a propaganda newspaper called Reality, were not highly original, they effectively adapted traditional pre-war "language of patriotism." NWAC was quickly disbanded after the war.

== History ==
=== Background ===
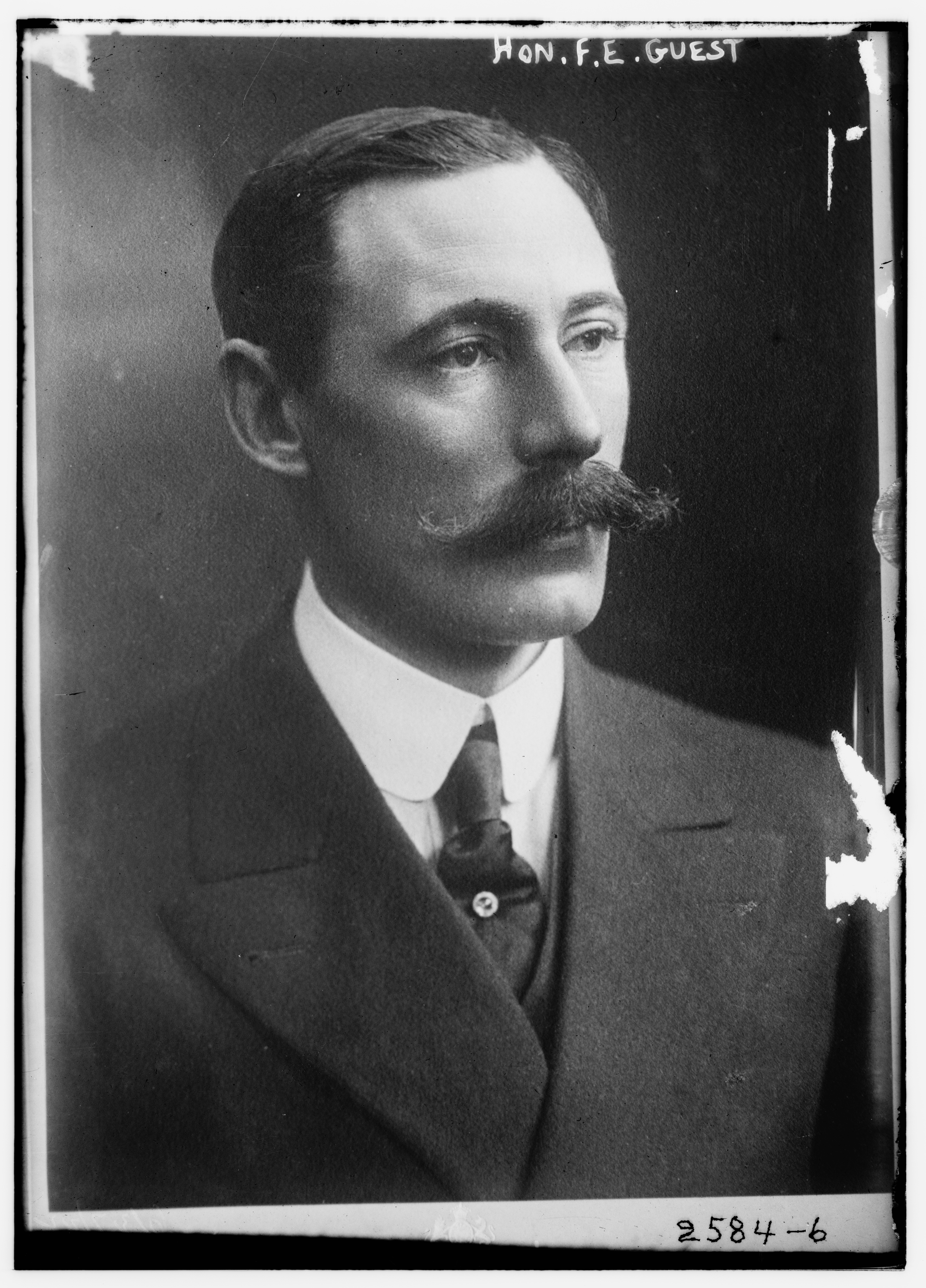
Frederick Edward Guest was the chairman of the committee, and it was therefore often referred to as the "Guest Committee."

There were several domestic propaganda efforts in Britain in the earlier part of the First World War. The Central Committee for National Patriotic Organization produced pamphlets including Why We Are at War and Great Britain’s Case to promote public support for the conflict. However, its increasingly inflammatory tone drew criticism from government officials. The Parliamentary Recruiting Committee (PRC) was targeted at those in the British public of 20 years or younger to volunteer for service in the war, and was doing well enough in the first part of the war, but as reports of the dead mounted, the British government introduced conscription in May 1916. There was another agency called Wellington House that was specifically dedicated to foreign propaganda, and less concerned with the home front.

Early in 1917, most of the existing propaganda offices were consolidated into the Central Department of Information, headed by John Buchan and formally attached to the Foreign Office, though it reported directly to the prime minister. At the same time, the War Office, operating independently of Buchan's department, established MI7, a large and effective section responsible for propaganda aimed at troops and enemy forces.

By mid-1917, the British government, led by David Lloyd George, was deeply concerned that public support in Britain for the First World War was weakening. After years of stalemate and high casualties, the public was tired and disillusioned. The failure of the Somme offensive to deliver a decisive victory was a major blow. German U-boat campaigns caused food shortages and rising prices, leading to public anger and strikes. The Russian Revolution emboldened a small but vocal part of the British left, culminating in the Leeds Convention, which called for a negotiated peace and workers' councils. The government feared that class and political divisions would undermine the war effort, which might lead to a German victory, or at the very least, unfavorable conditions.

=== Establishment ===
William Sutherland was the vice-chairman of the committee.

In response, the government created the National War Aims Committee (NWAC) to "stifle party and class dissensions." Although officially non-party, it was effectively a government-backed domestic propaganda organization, established using the existing machinery of the Conservative, Liberal, and Labour parties. Its official aims were to strengthen national morale, define the benefits of an Allied victory, warn of the consequences of a German peace, counteract pacifist propaganda, and inspire workers. Its inaugural meeting on 4 August 1917 brought speeches from all of the major parties, who stressed national unity and the need to fight until victory.

Over the next 16 months, the NWAC evolved from a small, privately funded organization into a large, publicly funded, quasi-official body. It became the primary instrument for domestic "patriotic education" for the remainder of the war. Initially reliant on private donations, the NWAC quickly exhausted its funds. By October 1917, it successfully argued for Treasury funding, receiving over £100,000 for a six-month period. This transition was controversial, with some MPs criticizing the use of public money for propaganda, but it was approved to avoid the perception that the campaign was funded by the "capitalist class."

With public funding, the NWAC expanded significantly. It moved to larger offices, hired salaried staff, and established two main departments: a Meetings Department and a Publicity Department. Its executive committee was carefully balanced with representatives from the Coalition Liberal, Asquithian Liberal, Conservative, and Labour parties.

=== Operations ===
The Publicity Department produced a massive volume of printed material, including pamphlets, newspapers, especially the newspaper Reality, and articles supplied to the press. It distributed hundreds of millions of publications, often using the existing networks of political parties and organizations like W. H. Smith & Sons. Cinema vans ("cinemotors") were also used to show official films to large audiences.

While it did monitor pacifist publications and coordinate with police to arrange counter-meetings, its primary purpose was persuasive "remobilisation" of public support, not violent suppression. Its main challenges were the initial lack of a definitive government statement on war aims and reluctant cooperation from some Labour groups.

NWAC expanded its operations well beyond those of its predecessors, organizing an estimated 100,000 public meetings across Britain. These events brought in well-compensated and thoroughly briefed speakers, especially professionals and soldiers on leave, and were carefully coordinated to reach both urban and rural audiences. Meetings were typically held twice daily from Monday to Saturday and were often attended by local dignitaries and guest speakers whose presence lent the gatherings an air of official endorsement.

The events combined patriotic speeches and songs to foster a sort of “participatory patriotism.” By the summer of 1918, the committee also organized commemorative “War Anniversary” events, which included outdoor religious services, processions, and ceremonies attended by civic leaders, clergy, veterans, and community organizations such as fire brigades and Sunday schools.

=== End of the war and disestablishment ===
NWAC ceased operations immediately after the Armistice in November 1918, its activities suspended for the upcoming general election. It was one of the first propaganda bodies to be fully shut down, a result of increasing contemporary British unease with state-led domestic propaganda, which eventually came to be seen as an "un-English" activity. Despite its scale, NWAC was largely forgotten. Post-war opinion came to equate propaganda with the lies and excesses of atrocity stories, leading to a long-term public suspicion of the practice. When domestic propaganda was revived in World War II, planners were initially unaware of NWAC's work, leading to early missteps

== Local WACs ==
The national NWAC established a network of local War Aims Committees (WACs) across the country, using the same structure, personnel (often local political agents), and methods as the former Parliamentary Recruiting Committee. The local WACs were the on-the-ground executives that carried out the national committee's propaganda campaign.

The NWAC placed "devotional faith" in the power of public meetings, seen as the essence of political legitimacy. It organized thousands of meetings across the country, targeting specific groups like industrial workers, women, rural populations, and soldiers. Speakers were primarily drawn from the parties' speaking staffs and over 100 MPs.

Established	Constituency	Secretaries/contacts
28/07/17	South Dorset	Col. G. F. Symes M.VO. (L); F.W. Powell (U)
30/07/17	Swansea	W.J. Crocker (L); B. Bottomley (U)
30/07/17	Isle of Thanet	Revd B.J. Salomons (L); H.W.M. Morris (U)
31/07/17	Leicester	Chas E. Clark (U); T.W. Smith (L); W.J. Arculus (U)
02/08/17	Huddersfield	James W. Morrison (L); E. Clarkson (U)
02 08 17	Great Yarmouth	Wm Wade (U); W.J. Oldman (L) Address: ‘Joint Secs …’
02/08/17	Jarrow	Jack Raine (L); George Clarkson (U)
02/08/17	St Helens	A. Valentine (L); R. Waring (La); P.A. Twist (U)
02/08/17	Wells	C.H. Poole (L); R.J. Cooke (U)
02/08/17	Hackney Central	Stanley Barton (U); Arthur S. Brown (L)
03/08/17	Horncastle	A. Julian (L); A.H. Beeton (U)
03/08/17	Lewes	Harry Courtney (L); Thomas Grave (U)
03/08/17	Bristol West	Vincent Thompson (U)
03/08/17	Carlisle	Henry K. Campbell (L); B.L. Hilton (U: resigned according to note)
03/08/17	Hull Central	A.T. Hallmark (U)
03/08/17	Hull East	David Harrison (L)
03/08/17	Southport	R. Standring (U); A. Keith Durham (L)
04/08/17	Wirral	F. Harrison (L); A. Birkett (U)
04/08/17	Rugby	J.R. Almond (U); F.M. Burton (L: deleted); J.J. Scrivener (L)
04/08/17	Harwich	J.A. Bolton (L); T. Ablewhite (U)
04/08/17	West Bromwich	Will G. Bastable (L); Alfred Curtis (U)
04/08/17	Rotherhithe	F.H. Benson (L); W. Queen (U); W.T. Hook (U: deleted)
04/08/17	Coventry	Leonard Walsh (U); Karl L. Spencer (L)
