= Henry Edwards (actor) =

English actor and film director (1882–1952)

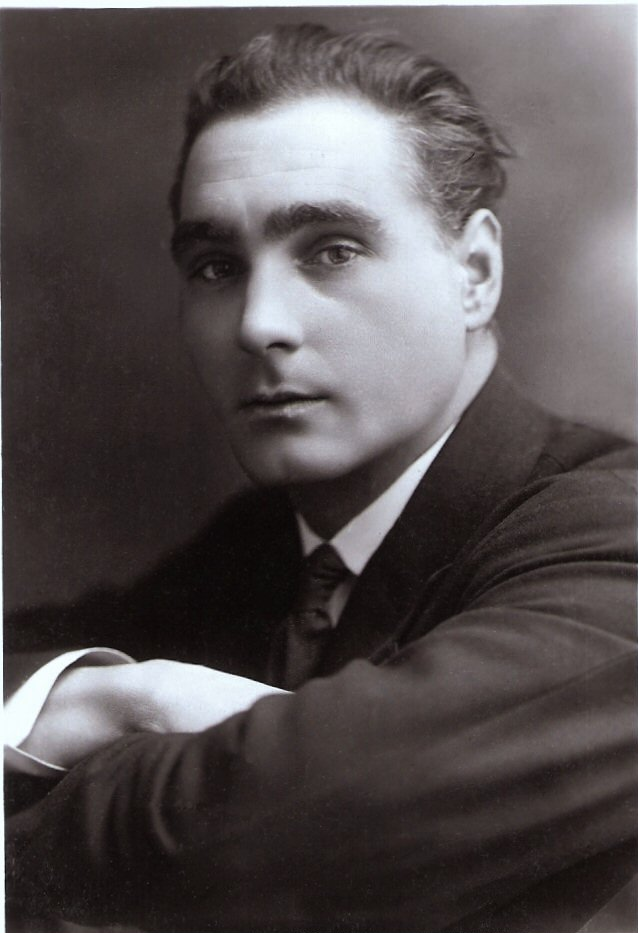
- Born: 18 September 1882; Weston-super-Mare, Somerset, England
- Died: 2 November 1952 (aged 70); Chobham, Surrey, England
- Occupations: Actor, film director
- Years active: 1915–1952
- Spouse: Chrissie White

Henry Edwards (18 September 1882 – 2 November 1952) was an English actor and film director. He appeared in more than 80 films between 1915 and 1952. He also directed 67 films between 1915 and 1937.

Edwards married actress Chrissie White in 1924. She appeared in many of his films as did the couple's daughter, Henryetta Edwards. He was born in Weston-super-Mare, Somerset and died in Chobham, Surrey.

== Partial filmography ==
=== Director ===
- A Welsh Singer (1915)
- Doorsteps (1916)
- Grim Justice (1916)
- East Is East (1916)
- Merely Mrs. Stubbs (1917)
- If Thou Wert Blind (1917)
- Broken Threads (1917)
- The Failure (1917)
- What's the Use of Grumbling (1918)
- Towards the Light (1918)
- The Poet's Windfall (1918)
- The Hanging Judge (1918)
- The City of Beautiful Nonsense (1919)
- Possession (1919)
- His Dearest Possession (1919)
- The Kinsman (1919)
- The Amazing Quest of Mr. Ernest Bliss (1920)
- John Forrest Finds Himself (1920)
- Aylwin (1920)
- A Temporary Vagabond (1920)
- Tit for Tat (1921)
- The Lunatic at Large (1921)
- The Bargain (1921)
- Simple Simon (1922)
- Lily of the Alley (1923)
- Boden's Boy (1923)
- The Naked Man (1923)
- The World of Wonderful Reality (1924)
- Owd Bob (1924)
- King of the Castle (1925)
- A Girl of London (1925)
- The Island of Despair (1926)
- One Colombo Night (1926)
- The Girl in the Night (1931)
- Stranglehold (1931)
- Brother Alfred (1932)
- The Flag Lieutenant (1932)
- The Barton Mystery (1932)
- General John Regan (1933)
- Discord (1933)
- One Precious Year (1933)
- Lord of the Manor (1933)
- Anne One Hundred (1933)
- Purse Strings (1933)
- The Lash (1934)
- The Man Who Changed His Name (1934)
- Lord Edgware Dies (1934)
- Are You a Mason? (1934)
- The Rocks of Valpre (1935)
- The Lad (1935)
- D'Ye Ken John Peel? (1935)
- Vintage Wine (1935)
- Squibs (1935)
- The Private Secretary (1935)
- Scrooge (1935)
- Eliza Comes to Stay (1936)
- In the Soup (1936)
- Juggernaut (1936)
- Beauty and the Barge (1937)
- Song of the Forge (1937)
- Vicar of Bray (1937)

=== Actor ===
- Far from the Madding Crowd (1915)
- The Man Who Stayed at Home (1915)
- Lost and Won (1915)
- My Old Dutch (1915)
- Nearer My God to Thee (1917)
- The Cobweb (1917)
- The Poet's Windfall (1918)
- Possession (1919)
- The Kinsman (1919)
- Broken in the Wars (1919)
- John Forrest Finds Himself (1920)
- The Lunatic at Large (1921)
- Tit for Tat (1921)
- Simple Simon (1922)
- Lily of the Alley (1923)
- Boden's Boy (1923)
- The Naked Man (1923)
- The World of Wonderful Reality (1924)
- The Flag Lieutenant (1926)
- The Fake (1927)
- Further Adventures of a Flag Officer (1927)
- The Joker (1928)
- Angst (1928)
- The Three Kings (1929)
- Circumstantial Evidence (1929)
- Ringing the Changes (1929)
- Call of the Sea (1930)
- The Girl in the Night (1931)
- The Flag Lieutenant (1932)
- General John Regan (1933)
- Captain's Orders (1937)
- Spring Meeting (1941)
- East of Piccadilly (1941)
- The Magic Bow (1946)
- Green for Danger (1946)
- Take My Life (1947)
- Oliver Twist (1948) as Police Official
- Woman Hater (1948)
- Quartet (1948)
- Brass Monkey (1948)
- Elizabeth of Ladymead (1948)
- London Belongs to Me (1948)
- All Over the Town (1949)
- Dear Mr. Prohack (1949)
- Golden Salamander (1950)
- Madeleine (1950)
- Double Confession (1950)
- Trio (1950)
- White Corridors (1951)
- The Lady with a Lamp (1951)
- The Rossiter Case (1951)
- The Magic Box (1951)
- The Card (1952)
- Never Look Back (1952)
- Something Money Can't Buy (1952)
- Trent's Last Case (1952)
- The Long Memory (1952)
