= Mr. Justice Raffles =

1909 novel by E.W. Hornung

- First UK edition
- Author: E.W. Hornung
- Language: English
- Series: A. J. Raffles
- Genre: Crime fiction
- Publisher: Smith, Elder & Co. (UK); Scribner's (US)
- Publication date: 1909
- Publication place: United Kingdom
- Preceded by: A Thief in the Night

Mr. Justice Raffles is a 1909 novel written by E.W. Hornung. It featured his popular character A. J. Raffles a well-known cricketer and gentleman thief. It was the fourth and last in his four Raffles books which had begun with The Amateur Cracksman in 1899. The novel was published in the UK by Smith, Elder & Co., London, and in the US by Scribner's, New York.

Unlike the three previous works, the book was a full-length novel and featured darker elements than the earlier collections of short stories. In it a jaded Raffles is growing increasingly cynical about British high society. He encounters Dan Levy, an unscrupulous moneylender, who manages to entrap a number of young men, mostly sons of the wealthy, by giving them loans and then charging huge amounts of interest. Raffles takes it upon himself to teach Levy a lesson.

At the end of Hornung's second Raffles short story collection The Black Mask, Raffles and his companion Bunny Manders volunteer for service in the Second Boer War in 1899 where he was killed at the hands of the Boers. Hornung had intended this as a patriotic finale to his hero's story. However there was great popular demand for the return of the character, and a number of generous publishing offers, and Hornung agreed to write another book.

In this he has been compared to Arthur Conan Doyle's decision to resurrect Sherlock Holmes after disposing of the character in "The Final Problem"; however, unlike Doyle's revelation that Holmes had actually survived the plunge over Reichenbach Falls, Hornung set Mr. Justice Raffles before the events of the Boer War. The comparison between the resurrections of Holmes and Raffles is made interesting by the fact that Doyle and Hornung were brothers-in-law. Indeed, prior to "officially" resurrecting Holmes, Doyle had used much the same technique with The Hound of the Baskervilles, his first post-Reichenbach Holmes story.

The title contains a more direct reference to Holmes, being a parody of "Mr. Justice Holmes" - that is, the American Supreme Court Justice Oliver Wendell Holmes Jr., whose father served as the direct inspiration for the great detective's name.

Its reception was mixed, with some fans lamenting the loss of the carefree gentlemen thief of the early stories. It was the last Raffles work written by Hornung, although a number of continuations have been written by other authors in a mixture of parody and homage.

== Plot ==
After an absence of three weeks, Raffles tells Bunny he has been taking the cure at Carlsbad as an excuse to try to steal jewelry from the wife of moneylender Dan Levy (whom Bunny calls Mr. Shylock), but returned early to watch his young cricket protégé, Teddy Garland, play at Lord's. At the Albany, however, they catch Teddy writing himself a cheque from Raffles's chequebook. Raffles easily forgives the distraught Teddy, who is seriously in debt to Levy, due to Levy's unfairly high interest. Raffles sends Teddy to sleep, then discusses Levy with Bunny.

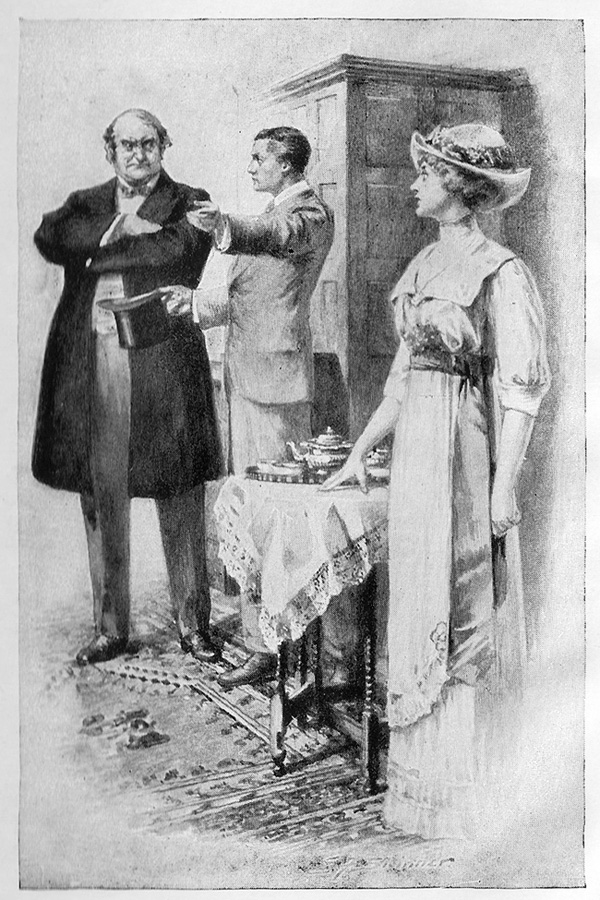
Levy, Teddy, and Belsize, illustration by E. F. Skinner

Next morning, Raffles and Bunny trick Levy into accepting money that Levy had loaned to Raffles as payment for Teddy's debts. Back at the Albany, however, Teddy has disappeared. Teddy's father, Mr. Garland, arrives, looking for him. Raffles suggests they check Mr. Garland's home for Teddy, but Teddy isn't there, either. While Raffles goes to search at Lord's, Bunny distracts Teddy's fiancée, Camilla Belsize, who seems jealous of Raffles's friendship with Teddy. Raffles returns without Teddy, and lies about him to Belsize. Abruptly, Levy and Mr. Garland enter the room. Levy and Raffles do verbal battle with veiled threats. Teddy finally returns, and dismisses Levy from the house. Levy retorts that he owns the house: Mr. Garland has lost it through debt to him.

Later, Levy visits Raffles and Bunny at the Albany. Levy suspects it was Raffles who stole (and then gave back) his wife's jewelry. He offers to forgive Raffles if Raffles will steal a document from an enemy lawyer. Raffles agrees to, on the additional condition that Levy forgive Mr. Garland's remaining interest payments.

Next day, Raffles and Bunny watch Teddy play at Lord's. Bunny talks to Belsize, while Raffles leaves to prepare the burglary. At night, Bunny joins Raffles in the lawyer's house, where Raffles swaps Levy's document with a fake. They escape the house, while avoiding two bruisers who are chasing them under orders of Levy. They return to Levy, but Levy hurls a whisky decanter at Raffles's face and throws the document into the fire. Bunny knocks Levy to the floor, rendering him unconscious.

Raffles recovers, and he and Bunny drag Levy, via a canoe on the nearby river, to an empty house's tower. Raffles drugs Bunny's food, so that Bunny sleeps; when he wakes, Bunny sees Levy is awake, and restrained. Raffles playacts as a judge, and puts Levy on trial. Raffles blackmails Levy into signing off Mr. Garland's debt, and also into writing Raffles a cheque, though Bunny disapproves. Raffles leaves to cash it. Levy tries to struggle against Bunny, but Bunny scares him off with a revolver, which mysteriously returns to his hand after it drops to a lower floor. Raffles returns and sends Bunny to the Albany, but Bunny instead visits Belsize. She confesses that she had secretly been in the tower, and had returned the revolver to Bunny's hand unseen, but makes Bunny swear not to tell.

"I'm only afraid you'll want to turn straight back from Calais, Bunny!"
"Oh, no, I shan't."
"You'll come with me round the world, so to speak?"
"To its uttermost ends, A. J.!"

— Bunny chooses to follow Raffles

On the way home afterwards, Bunny spots Inspector Mackenzie going to Levy's house. At the Albany, Raffles insists that they pack and leave England. At first, the reason seems to be that Levy has been suddenly murdered, but on the continental train Bunny learns that Raffles is actually avoiding Belsize, who Raffles has feelings for. At a station, they encounter Mackenzie, who informs them that Levy was murdered by an unrelated debtor. All danger at home is now gone. Regardless, Bunny stays with Raffles.

Several years later, Bunny, now Raffles's biographer of ruined reputation, runs into Teddy at a Turkish bath. Teddy eagerly bids Bunny to write all about the adventure involving him and his wife.

== Adaptations ==
The novel was adapted in 1921 as a film, Mr. Justice Raffles, starring Gerald Ames as A. J. Raffles.

It was adapted for television as the tenth episode of the popular British Raffles television series, with Anthony Valentine as A. J. Raffles and Christopher Strauli as Bunny Manders. The episode was titled "Mr. Justice Raffles" and first aired on 29 April 1977.
