= Henry Vibart =

Scottish actor (1863–1943)

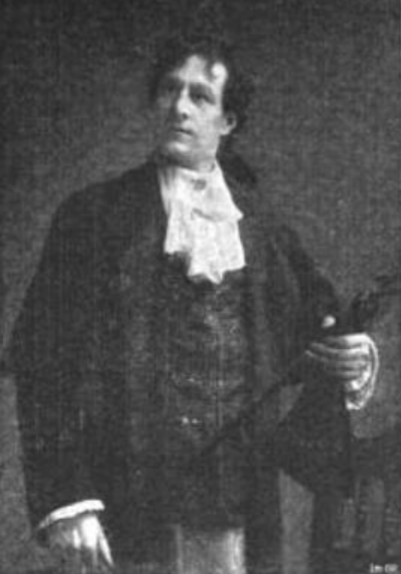
- In The Sketch, 8 January 1896
- Born: 25 December 1863; Musselburgh, Scotland
- Died: 30 August 1943 (aged 79); Chessington, England
- Occupation: Actor
- Years active: 1886–1931

Henry Vibart (25 December 1863 – 30 August 1943) was a Scottish stage and film actor, active from the 1880s until the early 1930s. He appeared in many theatrical roles in the UK and overseas, and featured in over 70 films of the silent era.

== Career ==
Vibart's prolific stage career began in 1886. Over the decades worked alongside some of the biggest names of British theatre, and toured extensively in the United States, Australia and New Zealand. Vibart gained a reputation as an exceptionally reliable actor, and it was noted on the occasion of his 10,000th stage appearance in 1923 that he had never once in his career missed a rehearsal or performance through illness or lack of dedication.

Vibart made his screen debut in 1911, and would appear in dozens of films over the next 20 years. His film appearances were usually in supporting character roles to the younger major cinema stars of the day. From the mid 1910s he became a regular member of the Cecil Hepworth stock company, featuring in many films directed by Hepworth and Henry Edwards until the collapse of the Hepworth studio in 1924. The end of his screen career coincided with the demise of silent films. He made only two sound films before retiring in 1931.

Vibart died in 1943, aged 79.

== Partial filmography ==
- Princess Clementina (1911)
- The Baby on the Barge (1915)
- The Nightbirds of London (1915)
- The Golden Pavement (1915)
- The Grand Babylon Hotel (1916)
- Annie Laurie (1916)
- Molly Bawn (1916)
- The Marriage of William Ashe (1916)
- Her Marriage Lines (1917)
- God and the Man (1918)
- Victory and Peace (1918)
- Castle of Dreams (1919)
- City of Beautiful Nonsense (1919)
- John Forrest Finds Himself (1920)
- Judge Not (1920)
- Enchantment (1920)
- The Amazing Quest of Mr. Ernest Bliss (1920)
- A Woman of No Importance (1921)
- The Four Feathers (1921)
- The Bargain (1921)
- Simple Simon (1922)
- The Bohemian Girl (1922)
- A Bill of Divorcement (1922)
- Flames of Passion (1922)
- Weavers of Fortune (1922)
- The Naked Man (1923)
- Woman to Woman (1923)
- Comin' Thro the Rye (1923)
- Boden's Boy (1923)
- The World of Wonderful Reality (1924)
- Who Is the Man? (1924)
- The Great Prince Shan (1924)
- The Prude's Fall (1925)
- Just Suppose (1926)
- The Flame (1926)
- Prince of Tempters (1926)
- The Dancer of Paris (1926)
- The Wilderness Woman (1926)
- Land of Hope and Glory (1927)
- The Nut Job (1927)
- Love's Option (1928)
- High Treason (1929)
- The Flying Squad (1929)
- The Bondman (1929)
- The School for Scandal (1930)
- Stranglehold (1931)
- Potiphar's Wife (1931)
