= Lionelle Howard =

British actor (1886–1930)

Lionelle Howard (1886 – 13 September 1930) was a British actor of the silent era who was born as Francis Nathan Coxin in Cirencester, Gloucestershire and died in Uxbridge, Middlesex. He appeared in a number of productions made by Astra Films in the years after the First World War.

== Selected filmography ==
- Old St. Paul's (1914)
- Barnaby Rudge (1915)
- The Man Who Stayed at Home (1915)
- The Nightbirds of London (1915)
- The Golden Pavement (1915)
- Her Boy (1915)
- The Grand Babylon Hotel (1916)
- Trelawny of the Wells (1916)
- Annie Laurie (1916)
- A Bunch of Violets (1916)
- The Marriage of William Ashe (1916)
- Sowing the Wind (1916)
- Molly Bawn (1916)
- The House of Fortescue (1916)
- The White Boys (1916)
- The Failure (1917)
- The American Heiress (1917)
- Her Marriage Lines (1917)
- A Grain of Sand (1917)
- The Forest on the Hill (1919)
- Sheba (1919)
- Aunt Rachel (1920)
- A Bachelor Husband (1920)
- The Street of Adventure (1921)
- The Wonderful Year (1921)
- Cherry Ripe (1921)
- The Headmaster (1921)
- The Double Event (1921)
- No. 5 John Street (1921)
- Expiation (1922)
- Petticoat Loose (1922)
- Little Brother of God (1922)
- A Debt of Honour (1922)
- One Arabian Night (1923)
- The Fair Maid of Perth (1923)
- Wanted, a Boy (1924)
- The Flying Fifty-Five (1924)
- Not for Sale (1924)
