= John MacAndrews =

British actor

- Born: Unknown
- Died: Unknown
- Occupation: Actor

John MacAndrews was a British actor of the silent era.

== Selected filmography ==
- The Vicar of Wakefield (1913)
- The Heart of Midlothian (1914)
- The Chimes (1914)
- For Her People (1914)
- Far from the Madding Crowd (1915)
- Barnaby Rudge (1915)
- The Nightbirds of London (1915)
- The Bottle (1915)
- Molly Bawn (1916)
- A Place in the Sun (1916)
- Trelawny of the Wells (1916)
- The American Heiress (1917)
- Nearer My God to Thee (1917)
- A Gamble for Love (1917)
- The Man Behind 'The Times' (1917)
- A Grain of Sand (1917)
- The Hanging Judge (1918)
- The Poet's Windfall (1918)
- Boundary House (1918)
- The Nature of the Beast (1919)
- His Dearest Possession (1919)
- The Forest on the Hill (1919)
- Sunken Rocks (1919)
- The Kinsman (1919)
- Broken in the Wars (1919)
- Once Aboard the Lugger (1920)
- Alf's Button (1920)
- John Forrest Finds Himself (1920)
- The Lunatic at Large (1921)
- The Bargain (1921)
- A Sister to Assist 'Er (1922)
- The White Hope (1922)
- Comin' Thro the Rye (1923)
- Mist in the Valley (1923)
- Strangling Threads (1923)
- What the Butler Saw (1924)
- The House of Marney (1926)
