= Gwynne Herbert =

British actress (1859–1946)

Gwynne Herbert (11 September 1859 – 17 February 1946) was a British stage and film actress.

== Partial filmography ==
- Liberty Hall (1914)
- The MiddleMan (1915)
- The Christian (1915)
- The Firm of Girdlestone (1915)
- The Shulamite (1915)
- Annie Laurie (1916)
- His Daughter's Dilemma (1916)
- Everybody's Business (1917)
- The Manxman (1917)
- A Fortune at Stake (1918)
- Boundary House (1918)
- The Nature of the Beast (1919)
- The Toilers (1919)
- The Kinsman (1919)
- The Homemaker (1919)
- Possession (1919)
- The Forest on the Hill (1919)
- Alf's Button (1920)
- Mrs. Erricker's Reputation (1920)
- Once Aboard the Lugger (1920)
- John Forrest Finds Himself (1920)
- The Lunatic at Large (1921)
- The Narrow Valley (1921)
- Tit for Tat (1921)
- Mr. Justice Raffles (1921)
- The Tinted Venus (1921)
- Dollars in Surrey (1921) (1921)
- Mist in the Valley (1923)
- Strangling Threads (1923)
- The Naked Man (1923)
- The World of Wonderful Reality (1924)
