= Chrissie White =

British actress (1895–1989)

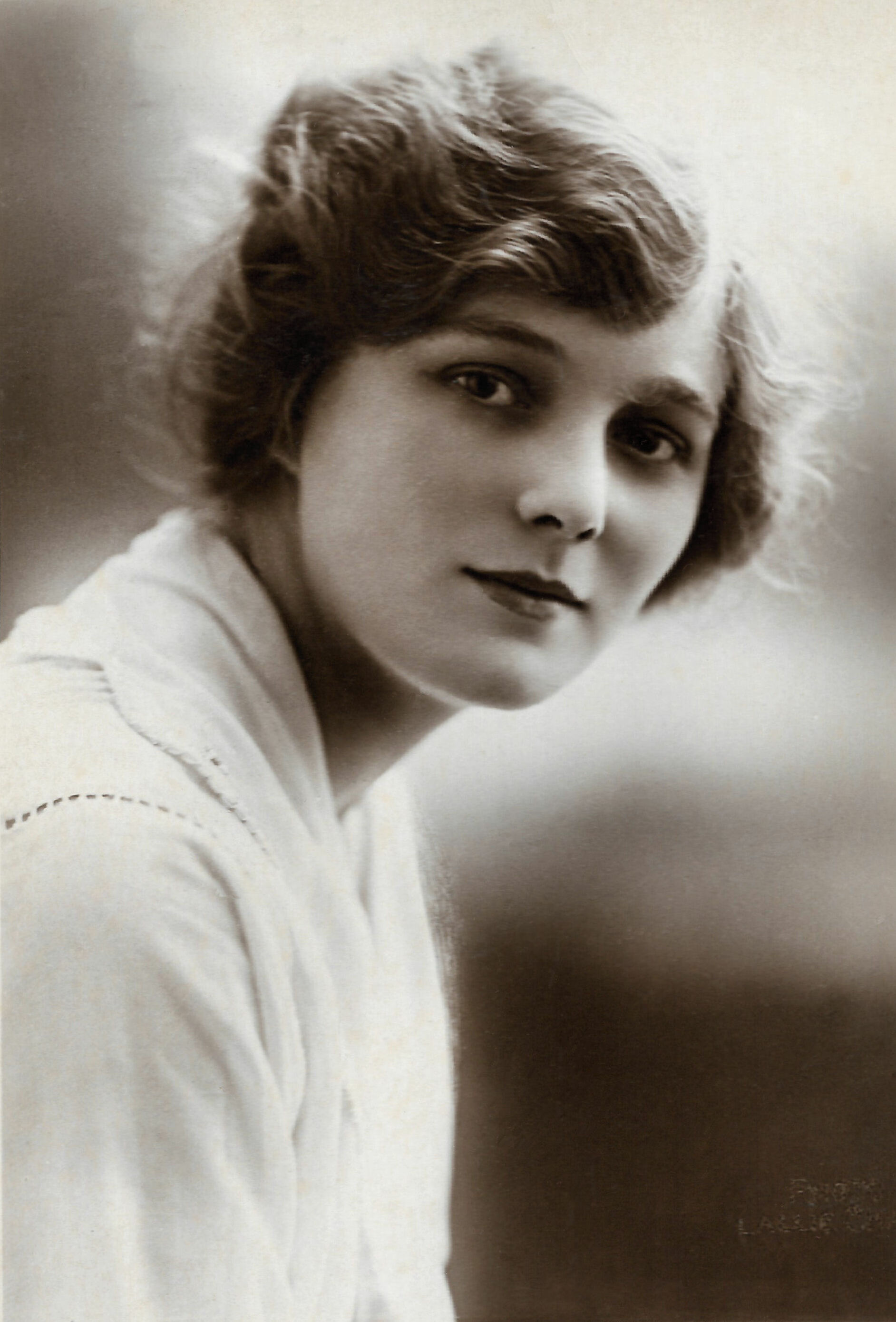
- Born: 23 May 1895; London, England
- Died: 18 August 1989 (aged 94); Liss, Hampshire, England
- Occupation: Actress
- Years active: 1908–1933
- Spouse: Henry Edwards (m. 1924; died 1952)
- Children: 2

Chrissie White (23 May 1895 – 18 August 1989) was a British film actress of the silent era. She appeared in more than 180 films between 1908 and 1933.

The peak of her popularity came with Alma Taylor in the "Tilly the Tomboy" series between 1910-1915. White married actor and film director Henry Edwards in 1922, and in the 1920s the two were regarded as one of Britain's most newsworthy celebrity couples. Edwards directed more than 20 of his wife's films. White married Edwards in 1924, the couple had two children, a son and a daughter, actress Henryetta Edwards.

White starred in the 1920 film The Amazing Quest of Mr. Ernest Bliss, which as of August 2010 is missing from the BFI National Archive, and is listed as one of the British Film Institute's "75 Most Wanted" lost films.

After 1924, she was absent from the screen until 1930, when she returned to make two talking pictures, Call of the Sea (1930) and General John Regan (1933), both directed by Edwards, after the latter film's release she retired from films.

Following the death of her husband in 1952, she withdrew from publicity. White died from a heart attack in Liss, Hampshire aged 94 in 1989.

== Selected filmography ==
Year	Title	Role	Notes
1913	The Vicar of Wakefield	Sophia Primrose	
1915	The Man Who Stayed at Home	Daphne Kidlington	
1915	The Nightbirds of London		
1915	Sweet Lavender	Lavender	
1915	Her Boy	Isabelle	
1916	A Bunch of Violets	Violet Marchant	
1916	Molly Bawn	Lady Cecil Stafford	
1916	The White Boys		
1916	Sowing the Wind	Maude Fretwell	
1917	The Failure	Margaret Gilder	
1917	Her Marriage Lines	Jean Neville	
1917	The Man Behind 'The Times'	Jet Overbury	
1917	A Grain of Sand	Doris Kestevan	Short
1918	The Poet's Windfall	The Girl	Short
1919	Possession	Valerie Sarton	
1919	City of Beautiful Nonsense	Jean Dealtry	
1919	The Kinsman	Pamela Bois	
1919	Broken in the Wars	Mrs. Joe	Short
1920	The Amazing Quest of Mr. Ernest Bliss	Frances Clayton	Lost
1920	John Forrest Finds Himself	Joan Grey	
1921	Wild Heather	Wild Heather Boyd	
1921	Tit for Tat	Peggy Smith	
1921	The Bargain	Mary	
1921	The Lunatic at Large	Lady Irene	
1922	Simple Simon	Rosemary Ruth	
1923	Boden's Boy	Barbara Pligrim	
1923	The Naked Man	Ninette Monday	
1924	The World of Wonderful Reality	Jean Dealtry	Lost
1924	Lily of the Alley	Lily	Lost
1930	Call of the Sea	Iris Tares	
1933	General John Regan	Moya Kent	Final film
