= A Turf Conspiracy (film) =

- Directed by: Frank Wilson
- Written by: Nat Gould (novel); Bannister Merwin
- Produced by: Walter West
- Starring: Violet Hopson; Gerald Ames; Cameron Carr
- Production company: Broadwest
- Distributed by: Granger Films
- Release date: September 1918
- Country: United Kingdom
- Languages: Silent; English intertitles

A Turf Conspiracy is a 1918 British silent sports crime film directed by Frank Wilson and starring Violet Hopson, Gerald Ames and Joan Legge. It is an adaptation of the 1916 novel of the same name by Nat Gould.

== Cast ==
- Violet Hopson as Madge Iman
- Gerald Ames as Gordon Chorley
- Joan Legge as Olga Bell
- Cameron Carr as Superintendent Ladson
- Arthur Walcott as Jack Rook
- Wyndham Guise as Tilston
- Tom Coventry as Abe Wrench
- Frank Wilson as Dick Bell
- W.R. Harrison as Detective Thawson

== See also ==
- List of films about horses

== Bibliography ==
- Palmer, Scott. British Film Actors' Credits, 1895-1987. McFarland, 1988.
