= Sowing the Wind =

Sowing the Wind may refer to:

- Sowing the Wind (play), a play by the British writer Sydney Grundy
- Sowing the Wind (1916 film), a British silent film
- Sowing the Wind (1921 film), an American silent film
- Sowing the Wind (1929 film), a French silent film
- Sowing the Wind (1944 film), a French film

== See also ==
- Reaping the Whirlwind (disambiguation)
