= A Turf Conspiracy =

A Turf Conspiracy may refer to:

- A Turf Conspiracy (novel), 1916, by Nathaniel Gould
- A Turf Conspiracy (film), 1918, directed by Frank Wilson
