= The House of Fortescue =

- Directed by: Frank Wilson
- Starring: Violet Hopson; Lionelle Howard; Stewart Rome
- Production company: Hepworth Pictures
- Distributed by: Harma Photoplays
- Release date: November 1916
- Country: United Kingdom
- Languages: Silent; English intertitles

The House of Fortescue is a 1916 British silent drama film directed by Frank Wilson and starring Stewart Rome, Violet Hopson and Lionelle Howard. An Australian millionaire marries a woman to help save her father's business from ruin.

== Cast ==
- Stewart Rome as Fortescue
- Violet Hopson as Ceclie Harding
- Lionelle Howard as Gerald Harding
- Harry Gilbey as Charles Harding
- Charles Vane as Jasper Mason

== Bibliography ==
- Palmer, Scott. British Film Actors' Credits, 1895-1987. McFarland, 1988. ISBN 978-0-89950-316-5.
