= A Gamble for Love (novel) =

1914 novel by Nathaniel Gould

- Author: Nathaniel Gould
- Language: English
- Genre: Sports
- Publication date: 1914
- Publication place: United Kingdom
- Media type: Print

A Gamble for Love is a 1914 sports novel by the British-Australian writer Nathaniel Gould. Like most of Gould's novels it is set in the world of horse racing.

== Film adaptation ==
In 1917 the novel served as a basis for the British silent film A Gamble for Love directed by Frank Wilson.

== Bibliography ==
- Goble, Alan. The Complete Index to Literary Sources in Film. Walter de Gruyter, 1999.
