= Ivy Millais =

British actress (1883–1969)

Ivy Millais as Stephanus (left) and Marie Leonhard as Mercia in The Sign of the Cross (1903)

Ivy Millais (25 December 1883 – 29 July 1969) was a British film and stage actress known for her work in the early 20th century. She had a notable career in silent film.

Born Isabel Katherine Malenoir in Mile End, London, in 1883, she was the second of four children of Katharine and Samuel Richard Malenoir, a fish salesman. Her stage roles included: Stephanus in The Sign of the Cross (1903-04), and The Prince and the Beggar Maid (1908-09), both at the Grand Theatre, Southampton.

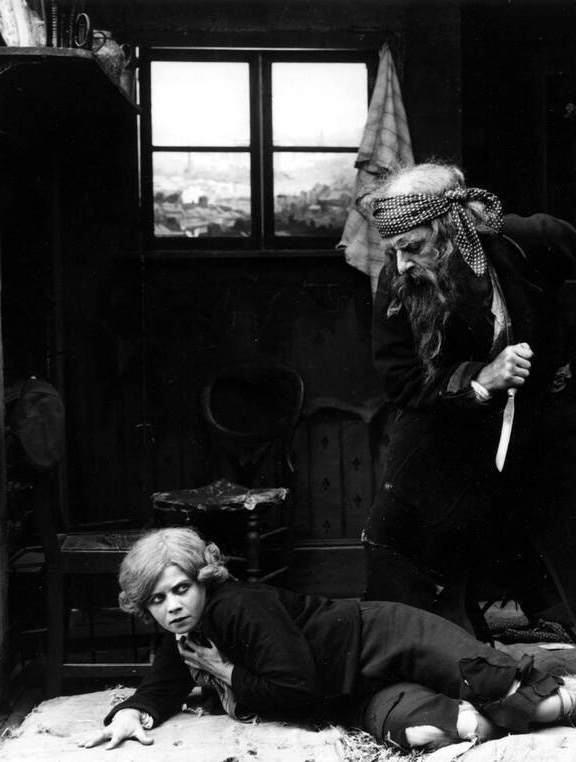
Ivy Millais as Oliver Twist and John McMahon as Fagin in Oliver Twist (1912)

Millais appeared in various films in the silent era, including: Oliver Twist in Oliver Twist (1912); Mate in The Cloister and the Hearth (1913); Ethel Loder in The Recalling of John Grey (1915); Mary Ashford in The Bottle (1915) opposite Albert Chevalier as her husband; Sarah in Trelawney of the Wells (1916); Jane Peach in Comin' Thro' the Rye (1916), and Liza, The Grain of Sand in A Grain of Sand (1917) opposite Stewart Rome and Chrissie White. She was married to surveyor Verney Charles Hannam Warren (1885-1963) from 1914 to his death.

Ivy Millais died in 1969 in Thames Ditton, Surrey.
