= A Gamble for Love =

1917 film directed by Frank Wilson

- Directed by: Frank Wilson
- Written by: Nat Gould (novel); Benedict James
- Produced by: Walter West
- Starring: Gerald Ames; James Lindsay; George Foley
- Production company: Broadwest
- Distributed by: Broadwest
- Release date: August 1917
- Country: United Kingdom
- Languages: Silent; English intertitles

A Gamble for Love is a 1917 British silent sports film directed by Frank Wilson and starring Gerald Ames, James Lindsay and George Foley. It was based on the 1914 novel of the same title by Nat Gould, set in the horseracing world.

== Cast ==
- Gerald Ames as Dennis Laurenny
- James Lindsay as Lord Ingleby
- Arthur Walcott as Joe Rothey
- Hubert Willis as Bryhynz
- Violet Hopson as Fay de Launay
- George Foley
- John MacAndrews
- J. Hastings Batson
- Elijah Wheatley

== Production ==
Filming began in June 1917, with scenes being taken at The Durdans in Epsom, Hawthorn Hill Racecourse, and additional scenes in Epsom.

== See also ==
- List of films about horses
- List of films about horse racing

== Bibliography ==
- Low, Rachael. History of the British Film, 1914-1918. Routledge, 2005.
