= A Turf Conspiracy (novel) =

1916 novel by Nathaniel Gould

- Author: Nathaniel Gould
- Language: English
- Genre: Sports, Crime
- Publication date: 1916
- Publication place: United Kingdom
- Media type: Print

A Turf Conspiracy is a 1916 sports crime novel by the British-Australian writer Nathaniel Gould. It is set in the world of horse racing.

== Film adaptation ==
In 1918 the novel served as a basis for the British silent film A Turf Conspiracy directed by Frank Wilson.

== Bibliography ==
- Goble, Alan. The Complete Index to Literary Sources in Film. Walter de Gruyter, 1999.
