= Her Boy =

Her Boy may refer to:

- Her Boy (1915 film), British silent drama film directed by Frank Wilson
- Her Boy (1918 film), American silent film drama directed by George Irving
