= The Baby on the Barge =

1915 British film by Cecil Hepworth

- Directed by: Cecil Hepworth
- Written by: Blanche McIntosh
- Produced by: Cecil Hepworth
- Starring: Alma Taylor; Stewart Rome
- Production company: Hepworth Manufacturing Company
- Release date: 1915
- Running time: 3 reels (2825 feet)
- Country: United Kingdom
- Languages: Silent film English intertitles

The Baby on the Barge is a 1915 British silent film drama directed by Cecil Hepworth and starring Alma Taylor and Stewart Rome. No print of the film is known to survive and it is presumed lost.

== Plot ==
While her sailor husband is away, Nellie Jennis receives a visit from her brother Jack, who is being sought by the police for an attack on another man. Jack claims he is being wrongly accused as his actions were in self-defence, and Nellie agrees to shelter him for a while until he can make good his escape. When her husband Bob returns home, he finds evidence which Nellie has overlooked indicating that a man has been staying in his absence. He assumes the worst and is consumed by jealous rage. Nellie refuses to break Jack's confidence by telling Bob the truth, and becomes so fearful and distraught about Bob's treatment of her that she flees from home, taking their baby with her.

Nellie finds employment with Lord and Lady Lafene, who are happy to let her keep her baby with her. Before long however, Lord Lafene starts trying to take advantage of her and she runs away again. Now homeless, destitute and with no means to look after the baby, she returns home in secret and leaves the baby for Bob to care for. Meanwhile, Jack's trouble with the police has been sorted out and he visits Bob, who now realises that he had suspected Nellie unfairly. He and Bob go looking for Nellie and finally manage to track her down. Nellie and Bob are reconciled.

== Cast ==
- Alma Taylor as Nellie Jennis
- Stewart Rome as Bob Jennis
- Lionelle Howard as Jack Storm
- Edward Lingard as Lord Lafene
- Violet Hopson as Lady Lafene
- Henry Vibart as doctor
- William Felton as thief
