= Trelawny of the Wells (film) =

1916 film by Cecil Hepworth

Trelawny of the Wells is a 1916 British silent romance film directed by Cecil Hepworth, and starring Alma Taylor, Stewart Rome, and Violet Hopson. It is an adaptation of the 1898 play Trelawny of the Wells by Arthur Wing Pinero. The story was later filmed as a late silent by MGM in 1928 under the title The Actress, starring Norma Shearer.

== Plot ==
A London West End theater troupe loses its star actress Rose Trelawny when she chooses to marry Arthur Gower a wealthy young man from another part of society. The story follows their love and the challenges they face. It also reflects the changing world of theater in the late nineteenth century.

== Cast ==
- Alma Taylor - Rose Trelawny
- Stewart Rome - Tom Wrench
- Violet Hopson - Imogen Parrott
- Lionelle Howard - Arthur Gower
- John MacAndrews - James Telfer
- Warwick Buckland - Sir William Gower
- Gwynne Herbert - Trafalgar Gower
- Marguerite Blanche - Claire de Foenix
- Percy Manton - Captain de Foenix
- William Felton - Ablett
- Ivy Millais - Sarah
- Amy Lorraine - Mrs Telfer
- Johnny Butt - Augustus Colpoys
- Bob Bouchier - Hallkeeper
- Sybil Coventry - Mrs Mossup
