= The Scarlet Lady =

The Scarlet Lady may refer to:

- The Scarlet Lady (1922 film), a British film directed by Walter West
- The Scarlet Lady (1928 film), an American drama film directed by Alan Crosland
- The Scarlet Lady (1969 film), English title for the French/Italian comedy film La femme écarlate / La donna scarlatta
