= Oliver Twist (1912 British film) =

1912 film by Thomas Bentley

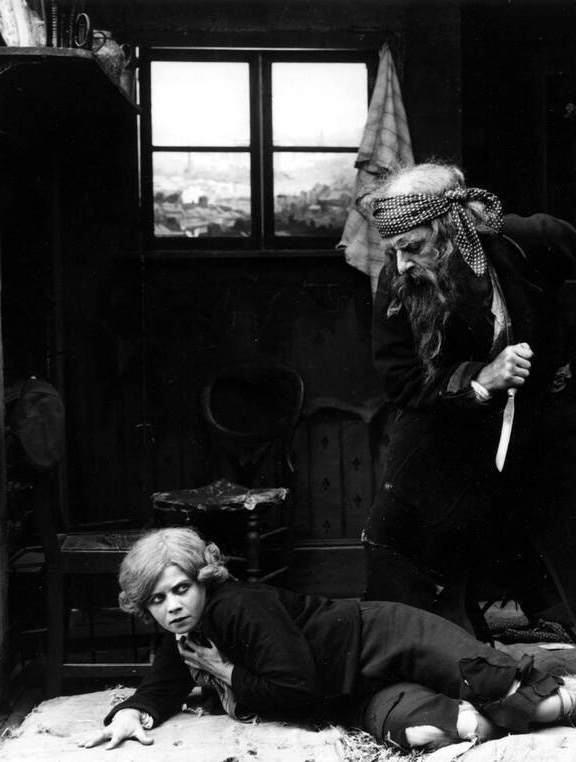
- Ivy Millais as Oliver Twist and John McMahon as Fagin
- Directed by: Thomas Bentley
- Written by: Charles Dickens (novel); Thomas Bentley
- Based on: Oliver Twist; 1837 novel by Charles Dickens
- Produced by: Cecil Hepworth
- Starring: Ivy Millais; Alma Taylor; Harry Royston
- Production company: Hepworth Pictures
- Distributed by: Hepworth Pictures
- Release date: September 1912
- Running time: 86 minutes
- Country: United Kingdom
- Language: English

Oliver Twist is a 1912 British silent drama film directed by Thomas Bentley and starring Ivy Millais, Alma Taylor and Harry Royston. It is an adaptation of the 1838 novel Oliver Twist by Charles Dickens. It was the directorial debut of Bentley who went on to become a leading British director. It was the first in a series of Dickens adaptations by Bentley.

== Plot summary ==
Oliver Twist is an orphan whose journey begins from a harsh workhouse into the underworld of London, where he encounters Fagin's gang of pickpockets, boys trained to steal for their master. After being wrongfully accused of theft and befriending Mr. Brownlow, Oliver is drawn back into Fagin's clutches, setting in motion a series of dramatic events that ultimately reveal his true parentage and reunite him with his family.

== Cast ==
- Ivy Millais as Oliver Twist
- Alma Taylor as Nancy
- John McMahon as Fagin
- Harry Royston as Bill Sykes
- Flora Morris as Rose Maylie
- Mr. Rivary as Mr. Brownlow
- Willie West as Artful Dodger

== Bibliography ==
- Giddings, Robert & Sheen, Erica. From Page To Screen: Adaptations of the Classic Novel . Manchester University Press, 5 May 2000
- Mee, John. The Cambridge Introduction to Charles Dickens. Cambridge University Press, 2010.
