= A Great Coup =

1919 film by George Dewhurst and Walter West

A Great Coup is a 1919 British silent sports film directed by George Dewhurst and Walter West and starring Stewart Rome, Poppy Wyndham and Gregory Scott. It was based on a novel by Nat Gould. The film is about a racehorse owner who decides to race his best horse in a major race meeting after his jockey is nobbled by the opposition.

== Cast ==
- Stewart Rome - Squire Hampton
- Poppy Wyndham - Kate Hampton
- Gregory Scott - Reid Gordon
- Cameron Carr - Richard Foxton

== See also ==
- List of films about horses
- List of films about horse racing

== Bibliography ==
- Low, Rachael. The History of British Film, Volume 4 1918-1929. Routledge, 1997.
