= When Greek Meets Greek =

1922 film

- Directed by: Walter West
- Written by: Paul Trent (novel)
- Starring: Violet Hopson; Stewart Rome; Lilian Douglas
- Production company: Walter West Productions
- Distributed by: Butcher's Film Service
- Release date: May 1922
- Country: United Kingdom
- Languages: Silent; English intertitles

When Greek Meets Greek is a 1922 British silent comedy film directed by Walter West and starring Violet Hopson, Stewart Rome and Lilian Douglas. It was adapted to film from Paul Trent's novel of the same name.

== Cast ==
- Violet Hopson as Christine Ward
- Stewart Rome as Cyrus Warner
- Lilian Douglas as Julie Warner
- Lewis Gilbert as Robert Craven
- Arthur Walcott as Strike Leader
- Marjorie Benson as Miss Lockwood
- Tom Beaumont as Robertson
- Bert Darley as Heller
