= List of films about horses =

Films about horses constitute a popular film genre. Some examples include:

== 0–9 ==
- 8 Seconds (1994)
- 50 to 1 (2014)

== A ==
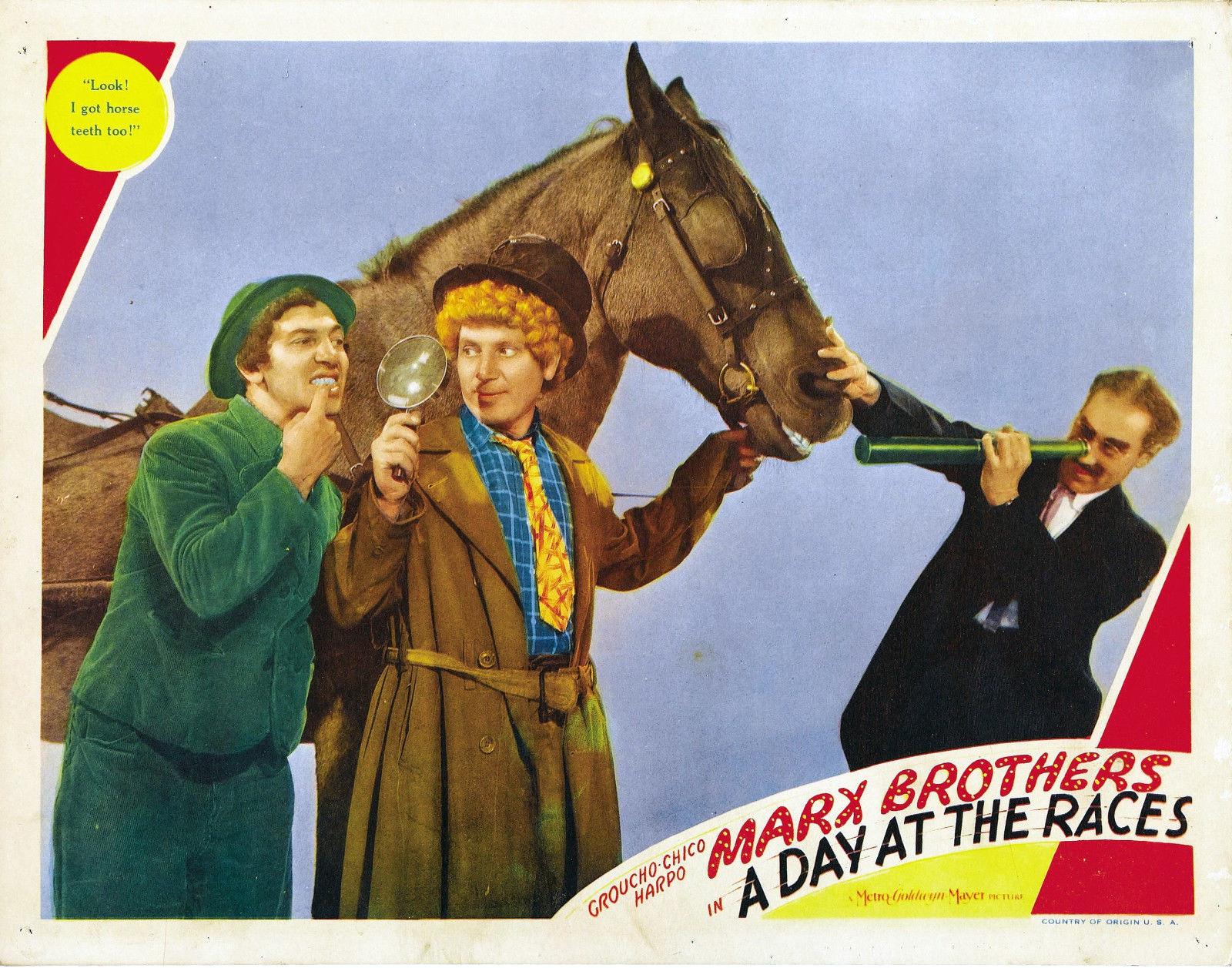
Lobby card for A Day at the Races (1937)

- Above the Limit (1900)
- Aces of the Turf (1932)
- A Day at the Races (1937)
- A Dead Certainty (1920)
- Adventures of Gallant Bess (1948)
- The Adventures of Rex and Rinty (1935)
- A Great Coup (1919)
- A Horse Called Bear (2015)
- All In (1936)
- All Roads Lead Home (2008)
- All the Pretty Horses (2000)
- Along the Navajo Trail (1945)
- An American Girl: Saige Paints the Sky (2013)
- The Appaloosa (1966)
- April Love (1957)
- Archer's Adventure (1985)
- Ariadne in Hoppegarten (1928)
- A Sporting Double (1922)
- A Turf Conspiracy (1918)

== B ==
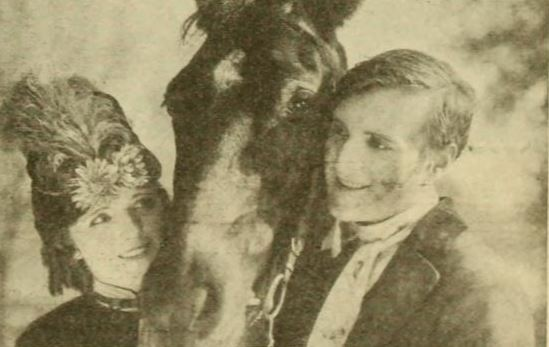
Still from the American film Black Beauty (1921) with Jean Paige and James W. Morrison, published on page 53 of the April 1921 Photoplay magazine.

- Barnet Horse Fair (1896)
- Beautiful Kitty (1923)
- Big Boy (1930)
- Bite the Bullet (1975)
- Black Beauty (1921)
- Black Beauty (1946)
- Black Beauty (1971)
- Black Beauty (1978)
- Black Beauty (1994)
- Black Beauty (2020)
- The Black Stallion (1979)
- The Black Stallion Returns (1983)
- Blue Fire Lady (1977)
- Blue Grass of Kentucky (1950)
- Boots Malone (1952)
- Born to the Saddle (1953)
- Boy Woodburn (1922)
- Breezing Home (1937)
- The Bride Wore Boots (1946)
- Broadway Bill (1934)
- Buck (2011)

== C ==
- The Calendar (1931)
- Carbine's Heritage (1927)
- Casey's Shadow (1978)
- Cavalry (1936)
- Champions (1984)
- Charlie Chan at the Race Track (1936)
- The Colt (2005)
- Come On George! (1939)
- Corral (1954)
- The County Fair (1932)
- County Fair (1937)
- County Fair (1950)
- Cowgirls 'n Angels (2012)
- Cowgirls 'n Angels: Dakota's Summer (2014)
- A Cowgirl's Story (2017)
- Crazy Over Horses (1951)
- The Cup (2011)

== D ==
- Danielle Steel's Palomino (1991)
- Danse avec lui (2007)
- Dark Horse (1992)
- Dark Horse (2014)
- Das Mädchen Marion (1956)
- Dead Heat (2002)
- The Derby (1895)
- Derby (1926)
- Derby (1949)
- Derby Day (1952)
- The Derby Stallion (2005)
- Der eiserne Gustav (1958)
- Desert Gold (1919)
- Devil on Horseback (1954)
- The Double Event (1921)
- Down the Stretch (1936)
- The Draft Horse (1942)
- Dreamer: Inspired by a True Story (2005)
- Drei Mann auf einem Pferd (1957)

== E ==
- Educated Evans (1936)
- The Electric Horseman (1979)
- En équilibre (2015)
- Ennodu Vilayadu (2017)
- Equus (1977)
- Escape from the Dark (1976)
- The Ex-Mrs. Bradford (1936)
- Eyes of Fate (1933)

== F ==
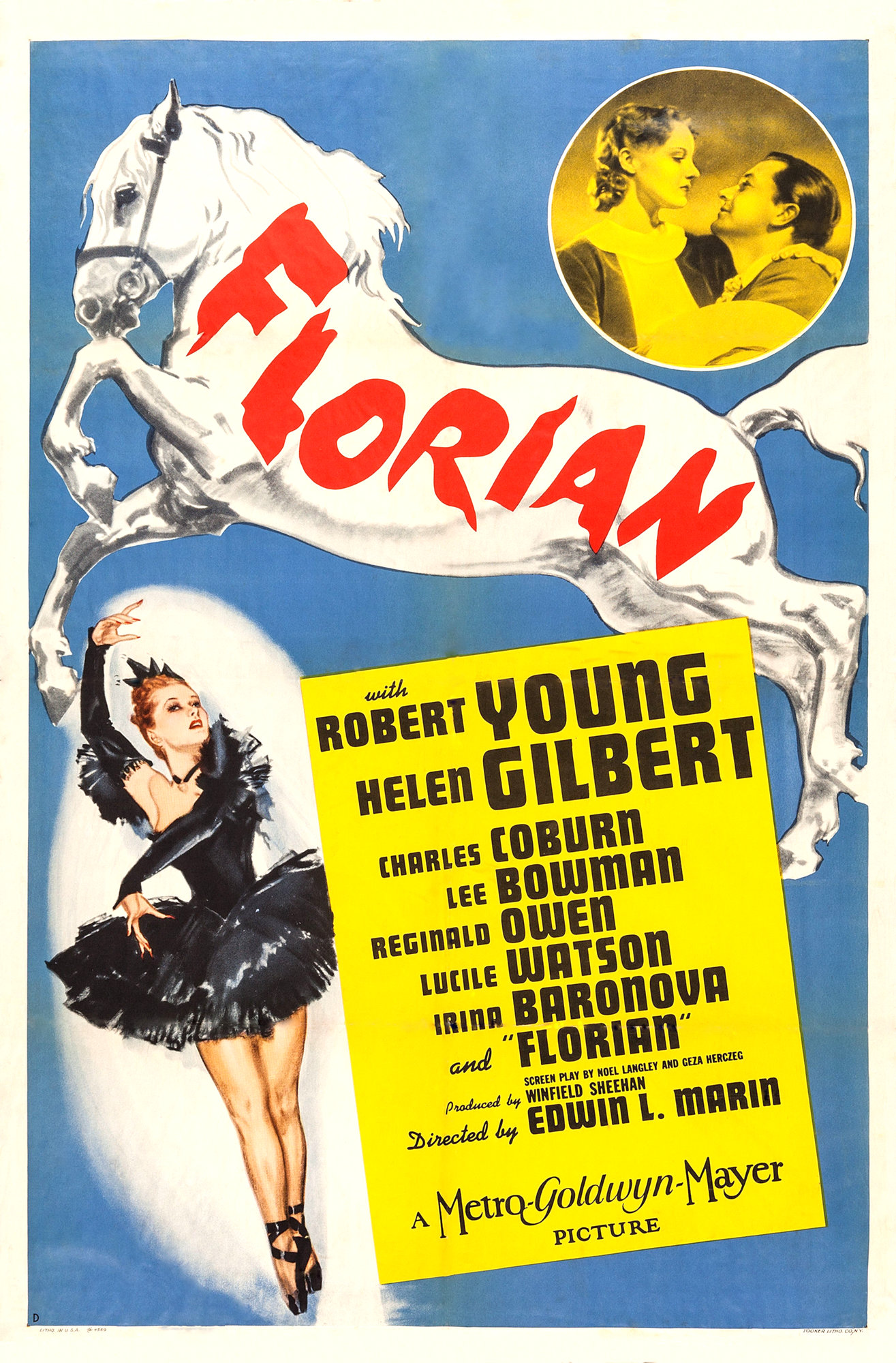
Poster for Florian (1940)

- Fast Companions (1932)
- Febbre da cavallo (1976)
- Febbre da cavallo – La mandrakata (2002)
- Felicity: An American Girl Adventure (2005)
- The Fighting Stallion (1950)
- The Flash (1997)
- Flicka (2006)
- Flicka 2 (2010)
- Flicka: Country Pride (2012)
- Florian (1940)
- The Flying Fifty-Five (1924)
- Flying Fifty-Five (1939)
- Francis Goes to the Races (1951)

== G ==
- Gallant Bess (1946)
- Gallopin' Gals (1940)
- The Galloping Major (1951)
- A Gamble for Love (1917)
- Garryowen (1920)
- Glory (1956)
- Going Places (1938)
- The Great Dan Patch (1949)
- The Great Mike (1944)
- Green Grass of Wyoming (1948)
- The Greening of Whitney Brown (2011)
- Gypsy Colt (1954)

== H ==
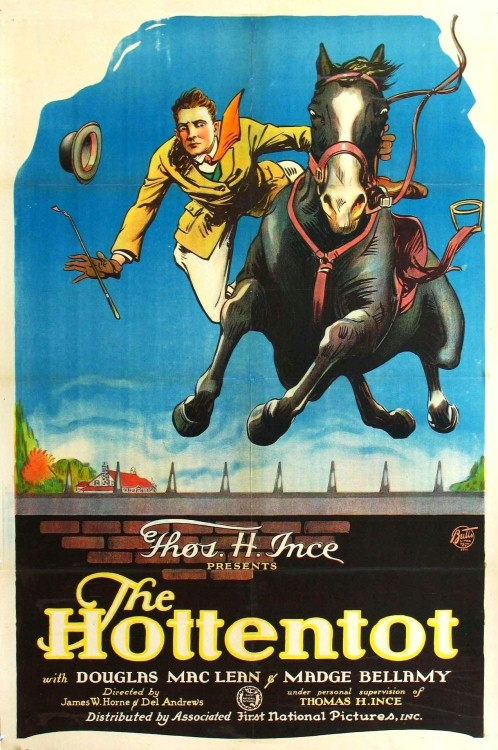
Poster for The Hottentot (1922)

- Heart of Virginia (1948)
- He Married His Wife (1940)
- Hidalgo (2004)
- Home on the Range (2004)
- The Horse Boy (2009)
- Hochzeitsnacht im Regen (1967)
- Home in Indiana (1944)
- Hoofs and Goofs (1957)
- Horse Sense (1999)
- The Horse in the Gray Flannel Suit (1968)
- The Horsemasters (1961)
- The Horsemen (1971)
- The Horse Whisperer (1998)
- The Horse with the Flying Tail (1960)
- Horsing Around (1957)
- Hot Tip (1935)
- The Hottentot (1922)
- The Hottentot (1929)
- Hot to Trot (1988)

== I ==
- The Immenhof Girls (1955)
- In Old Kentucky (1935)
- In Pursuit of Honor (1995)
- International Velvet (1978)
- Into the Straight (1949)
- Into the West (1992)
- It Ain't Hay (1943)

== J ==
- Jappeloup (2013)
- Jiggs and Maggie in Jackpot Jitters (1949)
- Jockey (2021)
- Johnny Steals Europe (1932)
- Justin Morgan Had a Horse (1972)

== K ==
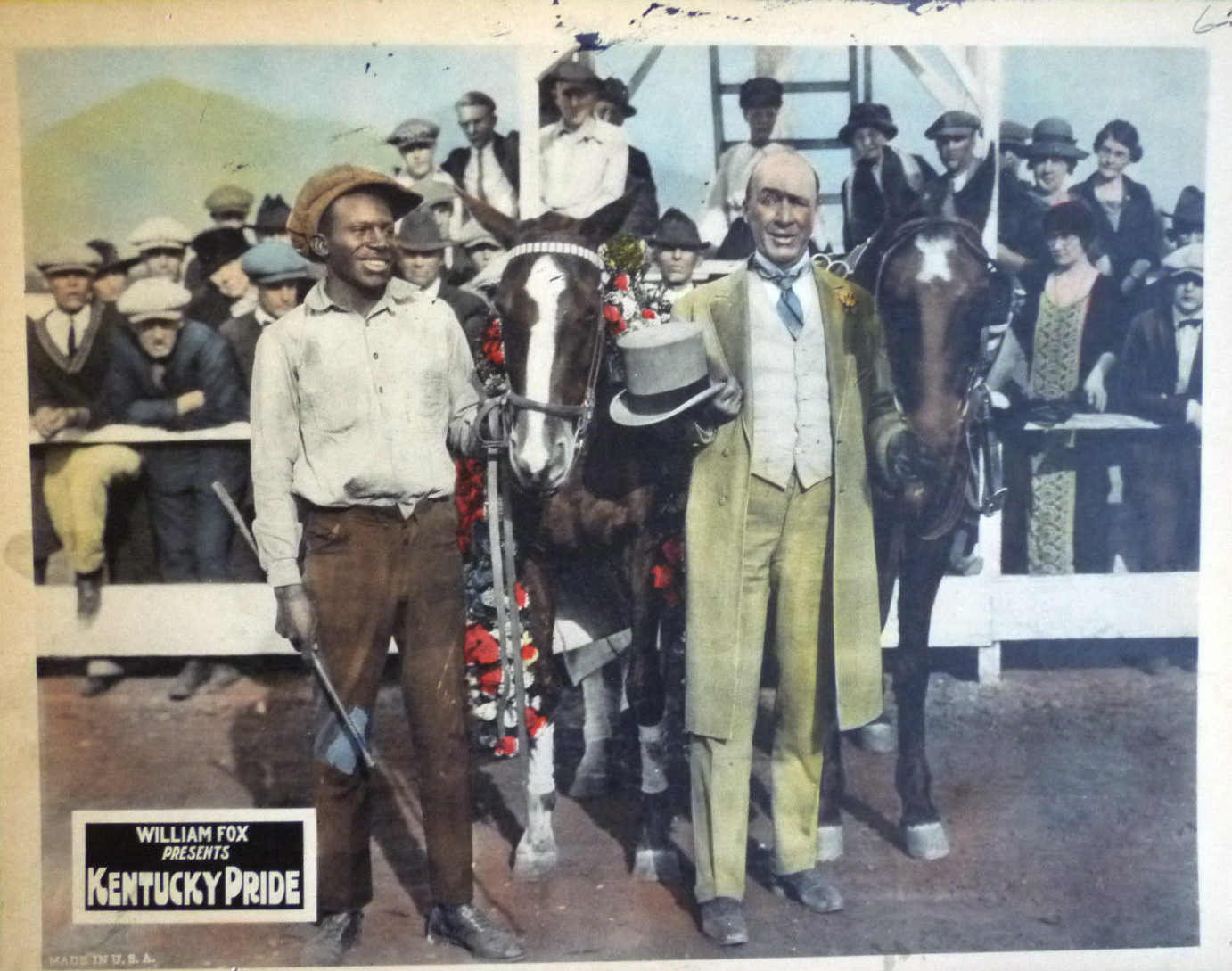
Lobby card for Kentucky Pride (1925)

- Keep 'Em Rolling (1934)
- Kentucky (1938)
- Kentucky Blue Streak (1935)
- The Kentucky Derby (1922)
- Kentucky Pride (1925)
- King of the Wind (1990)
- Kissing Cup (1913)

== L ==
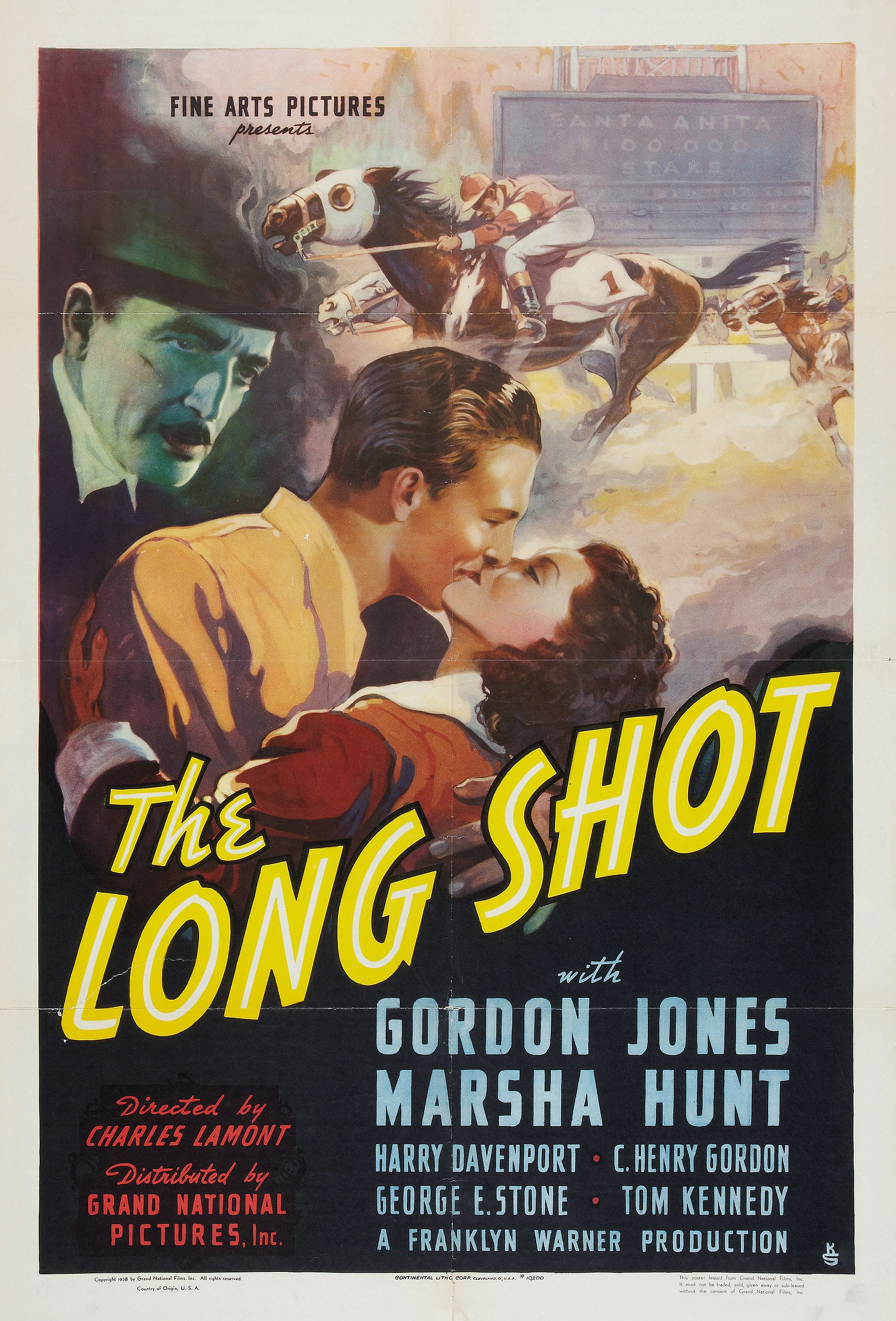
Poster for the American film Long Shot (1939)

- The Lady Owner (1923)
- The Law of the Wild (1934)
- The Lemon Drop Kid (1951)
- Lean on Pete (2017)
- Let It Ride (1989)
- Little Miss Marker (1934)
- Little Miss Marker (1980)
- The Littlest Horse Thieves (1976)
- The Littlest Outlaw (1955)
- Lonely Are the Brave (1962)
- Long Odds (1922)
- Long Shot (1939)
- The Longshot (1986)
- The Long Shot (2004)
- Lost Stallions: The Journey Home (2008)
- Luck of the Turf (1936)
- Lucky Blaze (1933)

== M ==
- Ma and Pa Kettle at the Fair (1952)
- The Man From Snowy River (1982)
- The Man from Snowy River II (1988)
- The Man in the Saddle (1925)
- The Man in the Saddle (1945)
- The March Hare (1956)
- Maryland (1940)
- Mazeppa (1993)
- Men of Chance (1932)
- Miracle of the White Stallions (1963)
- The Misfits (1961)
- The Missouri Traveler (1958)
- Misty (1961)
- Money from Home (1953)
- Moondance Alexander (2007)
- Mr. Celebrity (1941)
- Mustang! (1959)
- Mustang Country (1976)
- The Mustang (2019)
- My Brother Talks to Horses (1947)
- My Friend Flicka (1943)
- My Little Pony: A Very Minty Christmas (2005)
- My Little Pony: A Very Pony Place (2007)
- My Little Pony: The Movie (1986)
- My Little Pony: The Movie (2017)
- My Little Pony: The Princess Promenade (2006)
- My Little Pony: Twinkle Wish Adventure (2009)
- My Old Man (1979)
- My Pal Trigger (1946)

== N ==
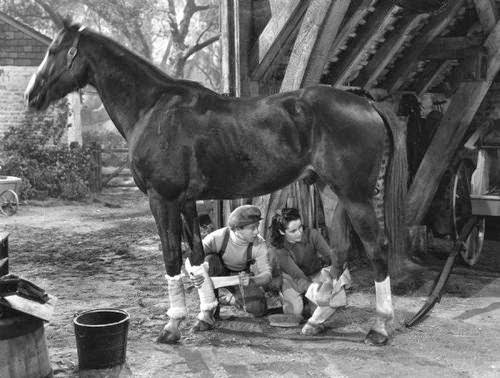
Mickey Rooney, Elizabeth Taylor and The Pie in National Velvet (1944)

- National Velvet (1944)
- Nico the Unicorn (1998)
- Northwest Stampede (1948)

== O ==
- Of Horses and Men (2013)
- Off to the Races (1937)

== P ==
- P.C. Josser (1931)
- Palio (1932)
- Pallard the Punter (1919)
- The Palomino (1950)
- Phantom Stallion (1954)
- Phar Lap (1983)
- Phar Lap's Son (1936)
- Playing the Ponies (1937)
- Pride of the Blue Grass (1939)
- Pride of the Blue Grass (1954)
- Princess and the Pony (2011)

== R ==
- Race (2008)
- Racetrack (1933)
- Racing Lady (1937)
- Racing Luck (1935)
- Racing Stripes (2005)
- The Rainbow Jacket (1954)
- Ready to Run (2000)
- A Reckless Gamble (1928)
- Red Canyon (1949)
- Red Dog: True Blue (2016)
- The Red Horses (1950)
- The Red Horses (1954)
- The Red Pony (1949)
- The Red Pony (1973)
- The Red Stallion (1947)
- Red Stallion in the Rockies (1949)
- The Reivers (1969)
- The Return of October (1948)
- Ride a Wild Pony (1975)
- Ride Like a Girl (2019)
- The Rider (2017)
- Riding for Germany (1941)
- Riding High (1950)
- Rodeo Girl (2016)
- The Rogue Stallion (1990)
- Rogues of the Turf (1923)
- The Rounders (1965)
- Ruffian (2007)
- Run for the Roses (1977)
- Running Free (1999)
- Running Wild (2017)
- Run Wild, Run Free (1969)

== S ==
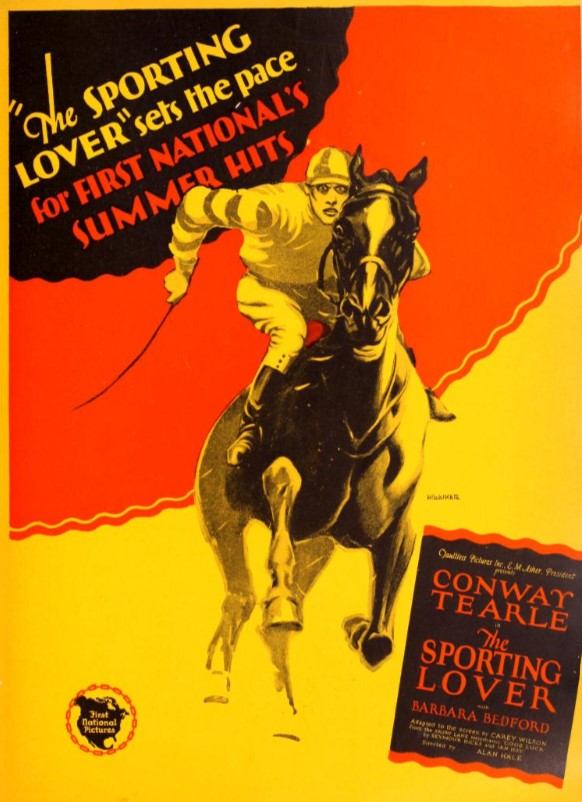
Poster for The Sporting Lover (1926)

- The Sad Horse (1959)
- Sand (1949)
- Saratoga (1937)
- The Scarlet Lady (1922)
- Seabiscuit (2003)
- Second Chances (1998)
- Secretariat (2010)
- The Secret of Cavelli (1934)
- The Shamrock Handicap (1926)
- Shannon's Rainbow (2011)
- She Monkeys (2011)
- Shergar (1999)
- She Went to the Races (1945)
- Silverstar (2019)
- The Silver Brumby (1993)
- The Sixth Race (1953)
- Smoky (1946)
- Snowfire (1958)
- Something to Talk About (1995)
- Son of Kissing Cup (1922)
- Sorrowful Jones (1949)
- Spirit Untamed (2021)
- Spirit: Stallion of the Cimarron (2002)
- Spirits of the Dead (1968)
- Sporting Blood (1931)
- Sporting Blood (1940)
- The Sporting Lover (1926)
- The Sport of Kings (1921)
- Stable Companions (1922)
- Stablemates (1938)
- Stakes (2015)
- The Steed (2019)
- The Stirrup Cup Sensation (1924)
- The Story of Seabiscuit (1949)
- The Strawberry Roan (1948)
- Stretch (2011)
- The Sunset Derby (1927)
- Sweepstakes (1931)
- Sylvester (1985)

== T ==
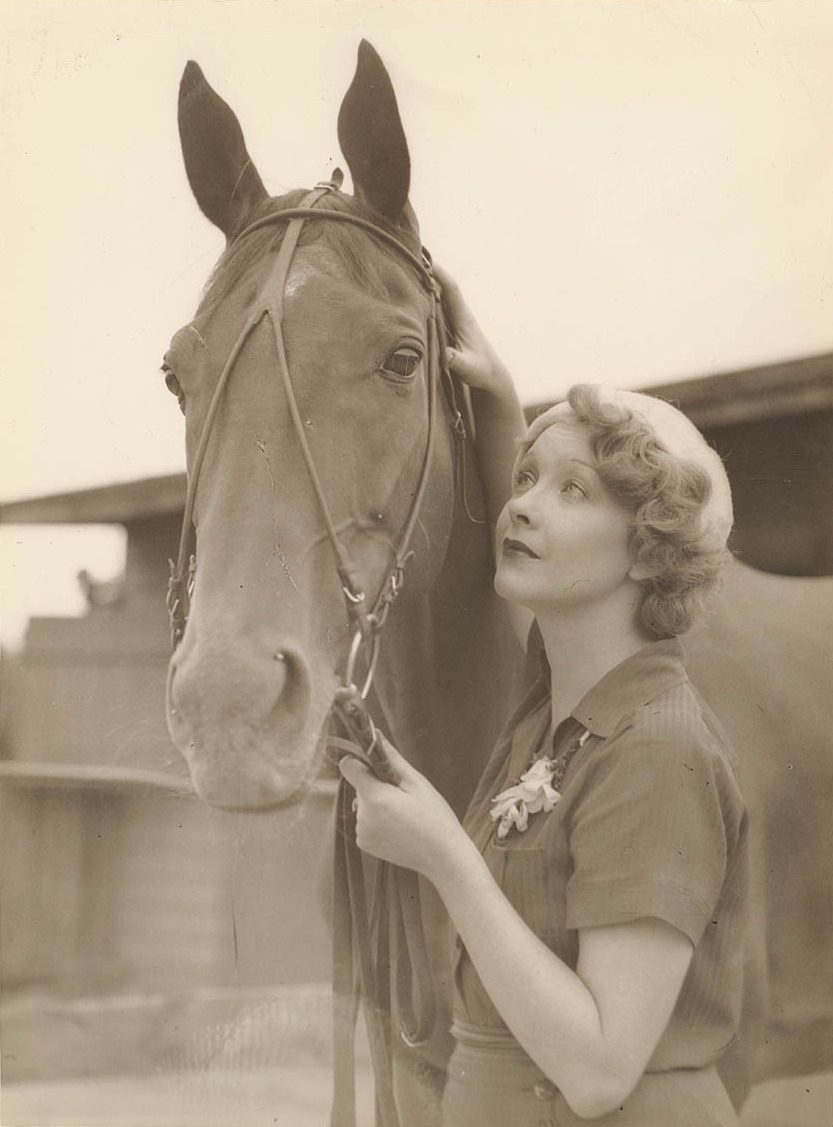
Helen Twelvetrees during filming of Thoroughbred, Sydney, 1936

- Take a Chance (1937)
- Thank Evans (1938)
- This Way of Life (2009)
- The Thoroughbred (1928)
- Thoroughbred (1936)
- Thoroughbreds Don't Cry (1937)
- Three Men on a Horse (1936)
- Thunderhead, Son of Flicka (1945)
- Tonka (1958)
- Trainer and Temptress (1925)
- Tumbleweed (1953)
- The Turin Horse (2011)
- Two Thoroughbreds (1939)
- Two Bits & Pepper (1995)

== U ==
- Under My Skin (1950)
- Under the Pampas Moon (1935)
- Up for the Derby (1933)

== V ==
- The Victor (1932)
- The Violet of Potsdamer Platz (1936)
- Virginia's Run (2002)

== W ==
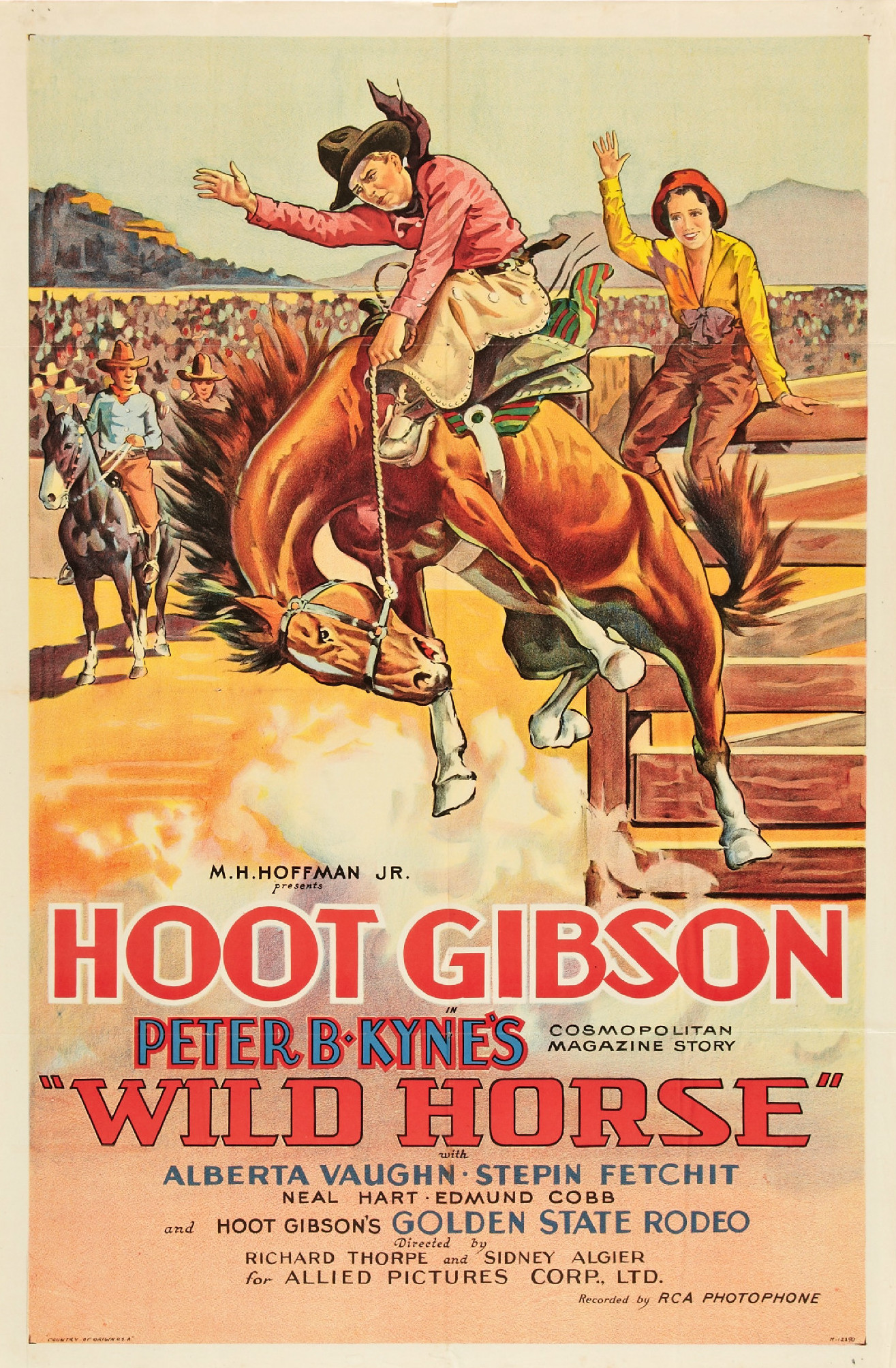
Poster for Wild Horse (1931)

- War Horse (2011)
- Weavers of Fortune (1922)
- Wedding in Barenhof (1942)
- What Price Loving Cup? (1923)
- Where Is Winky's Horse? (2007)
- The Whip (1928)
- White Mane (1953)
- The White Outlaw (1925)
- Wildfire (1915)
- Wildfire (1945)
- Wild Hearts Can't Be Broken (1991)
- Wild Horse (1931)
- Wild Horses (1985)
- The Wild Pony (1983)
- The Wild Stallion (2009)
- Wildfire (1986)
- Windstorm (2013)
- Wine, Women and Horses (1937)
- The Winged Horse (1932)
- Winky's Horse (2005)
- The Winter Stallion (1992)
- Winter's Tale (2014)
- Won by a Head (1920)

== Y ==
- You Can't Buy Luck (1937)
- The Young Black Stallion (2003)

== See also ==
- List of films about horse racing
