= Sowing the Wind (1921 film) =

1921 film directed by John M. Stahl

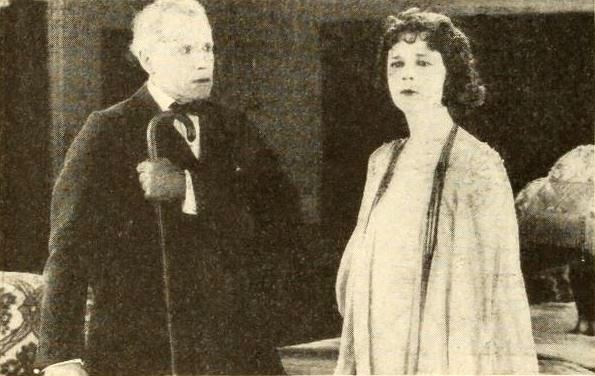
- Still from the film
- Directed by: John M. Stahl
- Written by: Franklin Hall
- Based on: Sowing the Wind by Sydney Grundy
- Produced by: Anita Stewart; Louis B. Mayer
- Starring: Anita Stewart; James Morrison; Myrtle Stedman
- Cinematography: René Guissart
- Production companies: Anita Stewart Productions; Louis B. Mayer Productions
- Distributed by: First National Pictures
- Release date: April 1, 1921
- Running time: 90 minutes
- Country: United States
- Language: Silent (English intertitles)

Sowing the Wind is a 1921 American silent drama film directed by John M. Stahl and starring Anita Stewart, James Morrison, and Myrtle Stedman. It is an adaptation of the British play Sowing the Wind by Sydney Grundy which had previously been turned into a 1916 film of the same title.

== Cast ==
- Anita Stewart as Rosamund Athelstane
- James Morrison as Ned Brabazon
- Myrtle Stedman as Baby Brabant
- Ralph Lewis as Brabazon
- William V. Mong as Watkins
- Josef Swickard as Petworth
- Ben Deeley as Cursitor
- Harry Northrup
- Margaret Landis
- William Clifford

== Preservation ==
Copies of Sowing the Wind are in the UCLA Film & Television Archive and George Eastman Museum Motion Picture Collection.

== Bibliography ==
- Goble, Alan. The Complete Index to Literary Sources in Film. Walter de Gruyter, 1999.
