= HMS Rawalpindi =

British armed merchant cruiser

Coordinates: 63°23′59″N 12°18′36″W

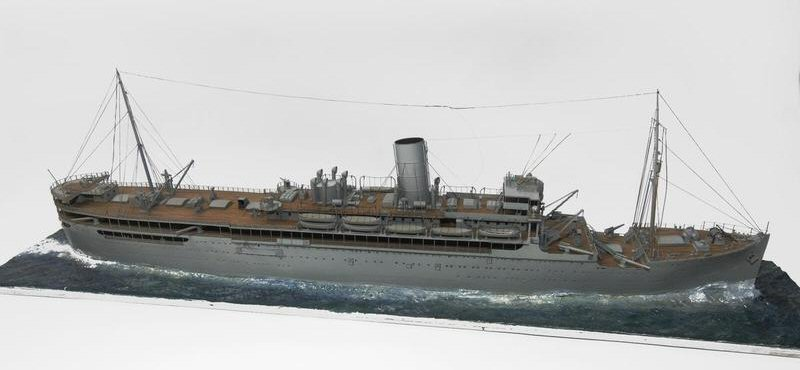
- Scale model of HMS Rawalpindi

History

United Kingdom
- Name: Rawalpindi
- Namesake: The city of Rawalpindi (British India)
- Owner: Peninsular and Oriental Steam Navigation Company
- Port of registry: (United Kingdom) Greenock
- Route: London–Bombay
- Builder: Harland and Wolff, Greenock
- Yard number: 660
- Laid down: 1923
- Launched: 26 March 1925
- Completed: 3 September 1925
- Home port: London
- Fate: Requisitioned by Admiralty, 24 August 1939

United Kingdom
- Name: HMS Rawalpindi
- Acquired: 24 August 1939
- Commissioned: 19 September 1939
- Out of service: 23 November 1939
- Fate: Sunk by German battleships, 23 November 1939

General characteristics
- Type: Armed merchant cruiser
- Tonnage: 16,697 GRT
- Length: 548 ft (167 m)
- Beam: 69 ft (21 m)
- Draught: 29 ft 6 in (8.99 m)
- Propulsion: 2 × quadruple-expansion steam engines
- Speed: 15 kn (28 km/h)
- Complement: 276
- Armament: 8 × 6 in (150 mm) Mk VII guns, 2 × QF 3 inch 20 cwt anti-aircraft guns
- Notes: sister ships: Ranpura, Ranchi, Rajputana

HMS Rawalpindi was a British armed merchant cruiser (a converted ocean liner employed as a convoy escort, as a patrol vessel, or to enforce a blockade) that was sunk in a surface action against the German battleships Scharnhorst and Gneisenau during the first months of the Second World War. Her captain was Edward Kennedy.

== Service history ==
=== Merchant service ===
The ship started life as the 16,697 GRT Peninsular and Oriental Steam Navigation Company (P&O) ocean liner Rawalpindi, built by Harland and Wolff. She was launched on 26 March 1925 by Lady Birkenhead, the wife of F. E. Smith, 1st Earl of Birkenhead, and joined the P&O fleet in September of the same year. She was named after the city of Rawalpindi, a British garrison town in what is now Pakistan. She had berths for 307 First Class and 288 Second Class passengers, and was employed on the London to Bombay service.

=== Naval service ===
The Admiralty requisitioned Rawalpindi on 26 August 1939 and had her converted into an armed merchant cruiser by the addition of eight elderly 6 in (150 mm) guns and two 3 in (76 mm) guns. She was set to work from October 1939 in the Northern Patrol covering the area around Iceland. On 19 October in the Denmark Strait, Rawalpindi intercepted the German tanker Gonzenheim (4,574 grt), which had left Buenos Aires on 14 September. The tanker was scuttled by her crew before a boarding party could get on board.

=== Sinking ===
While patrolling north of the Faroe Islands on 23 November 1939, she was detected at 16:07 by the German battleship Scharnhorst who was assigned together with her sister ship Gneisenau to attack the Northern Patrol. The German ship closed in on Rawalpindi and half an hour later signalled several times 'Stop! What ship?'. Rawalpindi answered with the signal 'F-A-M', altered course and started to lay smoke.

Despite being hopelessly outgunned, 60-year-old Captain Edward Kennedy RN of Rawalpindi decided to fight. He was heard to say "We'll fight them both, they'll sink us, and that will be that. Good-bye".

At 17:03 Scharnhorst opened fire at a distance of 7.5 kilometers, and Rawalpindi immediately returned fire. Three minutes later Rawalpindi was hit and started to burn fiercely. Rawalpindi managed to score one hit on the aft deck of Scharnhorst, which caused minor splinter damage. At 17:11 Gneisenau joined the fight and opened fire, but five minutes later the German commander ordered to cease fire as Rawalpindi signaled 'Please send boats'. Both German ships started to pick up survivors but at 19:15 German lookouts spotted another ship in the darkness and gave alarm. The German ships retreated northwards as the British cruiser Newcastle arrived on the scene. During the battle Rawalpindi managed to broadcast two signals to the British admiralty. The first signal mentioned she had sighted a battlecruiser, the second mentioned she was attacked by the heavy cruiser Deutschland.

238 men died on Rawalpindi, including Captain Kennedy. Thirty-seven men were rescued by the German ships; a further 11 were picked up by HMS Chitral (another converted passenger ship) 36 hours later. Captain Kennedy—the father of naval officer, broadcaster and author Ludovic Kennedy—was posthumously Mentioned in Dispatches. Crew members on Scharnhorst and Gneisenau were eligible for the High Seas Fleet Badge for participating in the sinking of Rawalpindi.

British naval forces mobilised to cut off the route for the German force back to Germany. Admiral Forbes with two battleships a heavy cruiser and the 8th Destroyer Flotilla departed the Clyde for a position off the Norwegian coast to intercept the German ships, still believed to be Deutschland, as they returned to Germany. The heavy seas forced some of the destroyers back to port. Two light cruisers and five destroyers were sent from Rosyth to the Fair Island Channel. Five light cruisers took station near North Rona to cover approaches to the Fair Island Channel. Two more light cruisers were to act as "a night attack striking force." Further cruisers and destroyers were assembled by calling off hunts for other German ships and recalling a convoy. Battleships, an aircraft carrier and heavy cruisers were redeployed. A combined British and French force around the battlecruisers Hood and Dunkerque assembled from Plymouth and Brest; it swept the Altantic for German battleships until November.

== Sister ships ==
Rawalpindi was one of the P&O "R"-class liners from 1925 that had had much of their interiors designed by Lord Inchcape's daughter Elsie Mackay. Her sister ships Ranchi, Ranpura and Rajputana were also converted into armed merchant cruisers. Rajputana was torpedoed and sunk by the German submarine U-108 in the Denmark Strait on 13 April 1941.
