= The Chimes (film) =

1914 British film by Thomas Bentley

- Directed by: Thomas Bentley
- Written by: Charles Dickens (novel); Thomas Bentley
- Produced by: Cecil Hepworth
- Starring: Stewart Rome; Violet Hopson; Warwick Buckland
- Production company: Hepworth Pictures
- Release date: August 1914
- Country: United Kingdom
- Language: English

The Chimes is a 1914 British silent drama film directed by Thomas Bentley and starring Stewart Rome, Violet Hopson and Warwick Buckland. It was based on the 1844 novel The Chimes by Charles Dickens.

== Cast ==
- Stewart Rome as Richard
- Violet Hopson as Meg Veck
- Warwick Buckland as Trotty Veck
- Harry Gilbey as Sir Richard Bowley
- Johnny Butt as Alderman Cute
- John MacAndrews as Will Fern
- Muriel Smith as Lillian

== Bibliography ==
- Giddings, Robert & Sheen, Erica. From Page To Screen: Adaptations of the Classic Novel . Manchester University Press, 5 May 2000
- Mee, John. The Cambridge Introduction to Charles Dickens. Cambridge University Press, 2010.
