= The Imperfect Lover =

1921 film

The Imperfect Lover is a 1921 British silent drama film directed by Walter West and starring Violet Hopson, Stewart Rome and Cameron Carr.

== Cast ==
- Violet Hopson - Noreen Grene
- Stewart Rome - Robert Lawne
- Cameron Carr - Captain Sterne
- Simeon Stuart - Mr. Grene
- Dennis Esmond - Conrad Grene
- Pauline Johnson -Barbara Grene
