= The Jewel Thieves Outwitted =

- Directed by: Frank Wilson
- Produced by: Cecil Hepworth
- Starring: Jack Hulcup
- Distributed by: Hepworth
- Release date: 16 January 1913
- Running time: 12 minutes
- Country: United Kingdom
- Languages: Silent; English

The Jewel Thieves Outwitted is a 1913 silent film short directed by Frank Wilson, starring Jack Hulcup, Violet Hopson, Rachel de Solla.. It lasts for 12 minutes and focuses around the genres of crime and drama.

== Cast ==
- Jack Hulcup - The Thief
- Violet Hopson - The Maid
- Rachel de Solla - Lady Randall
