= A Daughter of Eve =

1919 British film by Walter West

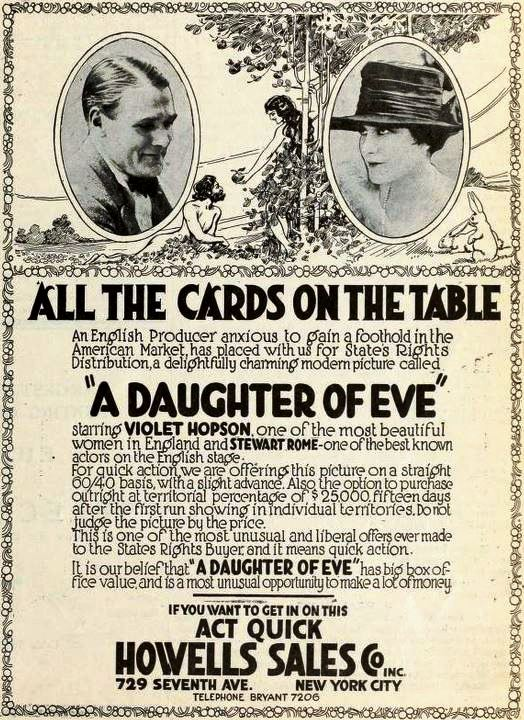
- Ad for film with Hopson and Rome
- Directed by: Walter West
- Produced by: Walter West
- Starring: Violet Hopson; Stewart Rome; Cameron Carr
- Production company: Broadwest Film Company
- Distributed by: Walter Daw & Sons
- Release date: 1919
- Running time: Five reels
- Country: United Kingdom
- Language: Silent

A Daughter of Eve is a 1919 British silent crime film directed by Walter West and starring Violet Hopson, Stewart Rome and Cameron Carr. Ronald Colman made an early screen appearance.

== Cast ==
- Violet Hopson as Jessica Bond
- Stewart Rome as Sidney Strangeways
- Cameron Carr as Charles Strangeways
- Ralph Forster as John Bond
- Edward Banfield as Sir Hugh Strangeways
- Vesta Sylva as Jessica as A Child
- Ronald Colman as Minor Role

== Preservation ==
A complete copy of A Daughter of Eve is held by Library and Archives Canada.

== See also ==
- List of British films before 1920
