= SS Ranchi =

British ocean liner

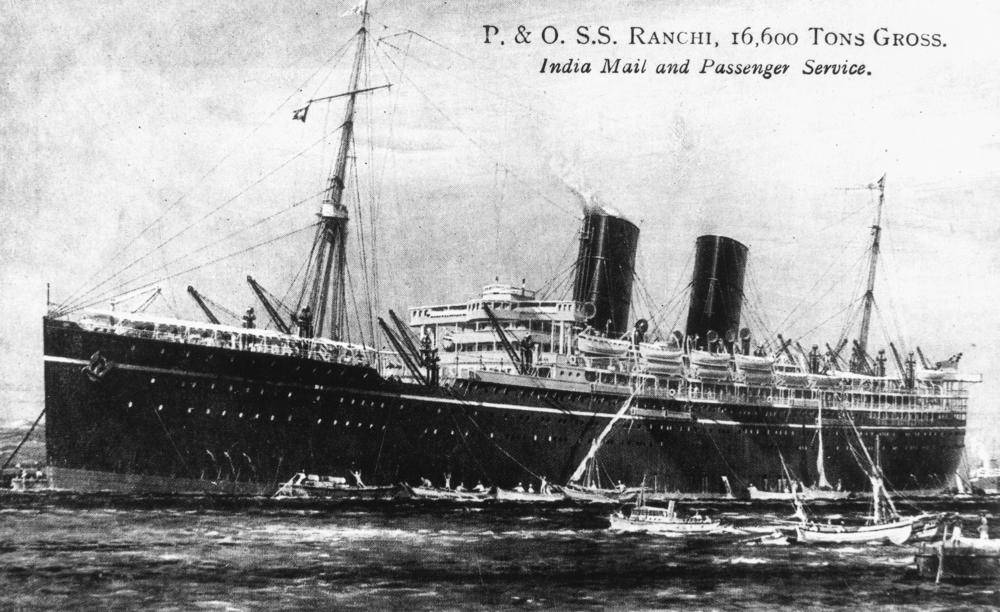
- Ranchi as originally built, with two funnels

History

United Kingdom
- Name: Ranchi
- Namesake: Ranchi
- Owner: Peninsular and Oriental SN Co
- Operator: Peninsular and Oriental SN Co (1925–39, 1943–53); (United Kingdom) Royal Navy (1939–43)
- Port of registry: (United Kingdom) Newcastle
- Builder: Hawthorn Leslie & Co, Hebburn
- Yard number: 534
- Launched: 24 January 1925
- Reclassified: armed merchant cruiser (1939), troop ship (1943)
- Identification: UK official number 148130; code letters KSTQ (until 1933); call sign GLKW (1934 onwards); pennant number F15 (1939–43)
- Fate: Scrapped at Newport, Wales, 1953

General characteristics
- Class & type: P&O "R" Class
- Type: Ocean liner
- Tonnage: 16,738 GRT; 8,850 NRT (until 1938); 8,827 NRT (1939 onward)
- Length: 548.5 ft (167.2 m)
- Beam: 71.3 ft (21.7 m)
- Depth: 43.2 ft (13.2 m)
- Decks: 3
- Propulsion: quadruple-expansion steam engines; low-pressure steam turbines; twin screws
- Speed: 17.5 kn (32.4 km/h)
- Sensors & processing systems: wireless direction finding
- Armament: as AMC: 8 × BL 6 inch Mk XII naval guns; 2 × QF 3 inch 20 cwt anti-aircraft guns
- Notes: sister ships: Ranpura, Rajputana, Rawalpindi

SS Ranchi was Peninsular and Oriental Steam Navigation Company "R"-class steam ocean liner that was built in 1925 and scrapped in 1953. From 1939 to 1943 she was the Royal Navy armed merchant cruiser HMS Ranchi.

From 1943 to 1947 she was a troop ship for the Ministry of War Transport and post-war Ministry of Transport.

== Building and technical data ==
Hawthorn Leslie and Company of Hebburn, County Durham built Ranchi for P&O. Her yard number was 534. She was launched on 24 January 1925 and completed on 29 July. She was 548.5 ft (167.2 m) long and had a beam of 71.3 ft (21.7 m). Her gross register tonnage was 16,738, and as built her net register tonnage was 8,850.

P&O's "R"-Class included Ranchi's sister ships Ranpura, Rajputana and Rawalpindi, all built in 1924 and 1925. Like her sisters Ranchi had quadruple-expansion steam engines, but unlike her sisters she also had low-pressure steam turbines to re-use exhaust steam from her reciprocating engines. The turbines were coupled to her propeller shafts by double reduction gearing. She had twin propellers. The turbines both improved her fuel efficiency and made Ranchi slightly faster than her sisters, with a cruising speed of 17.5 kn (32.4 km/h).

Ranchi had berths for 600 passengers. Lord Inchcape's daughter Elsie Mackay designed much of the interiors of all the R-class ships.

The ship was named after the city of Ranchi, now the capital of Jharkhand state in eastern India. Her UK official number was 148130. Her code letters were KSTQ until 1933, when they were superseded by the call sign GLKW.

Until the Second World War Ranchi was painted in P&O's traditional colours for steamships. Her hull was black with a white band. Her boot-topping was red, her superstructure was stone-coloured, and her funnels and ventilators were black. As built, she had two funnels.

== Pre-war service ==
Ranchi sailed on a scheduled route between England and Bombay, India. Later she sailed to the Far East.

Novelist Evelyn Waugh travelled on Ranchi in 1929 from Port Said to Malta as described in his travel book Labels.

In 1939 Ranchi's net register tonnage was revised to 8,827.

== Armed merchant cruiser ==
The Admiralty requisitioned Ranchi for the Royal Navy on 27 August 1939, less than a week before the UK entered World War II. She was commissioned on 23 October 1939 as the armed merchant cruiser (AMC) HMS Ranchi with the pennant number F15. The Admiralty also requisitioned her sisters Ranpura, Rawalpindi and Rajputana as AMCs. AMCs escorted merchant convoys in the early years of the war, as the Royal Navy did not have enough warships to spare for the purpose.

From October 1939 until February 1942 Ranchi served the East Indies Station. From March 1942 until January 1943 she was part of the Eastern Fleet (Indian Ocean). On 16 March 1943 the Admiralty released Ranchi from the Royal Navy, and the Ministry of War Transport had her converted into a troop ship.

== Troop ship ==
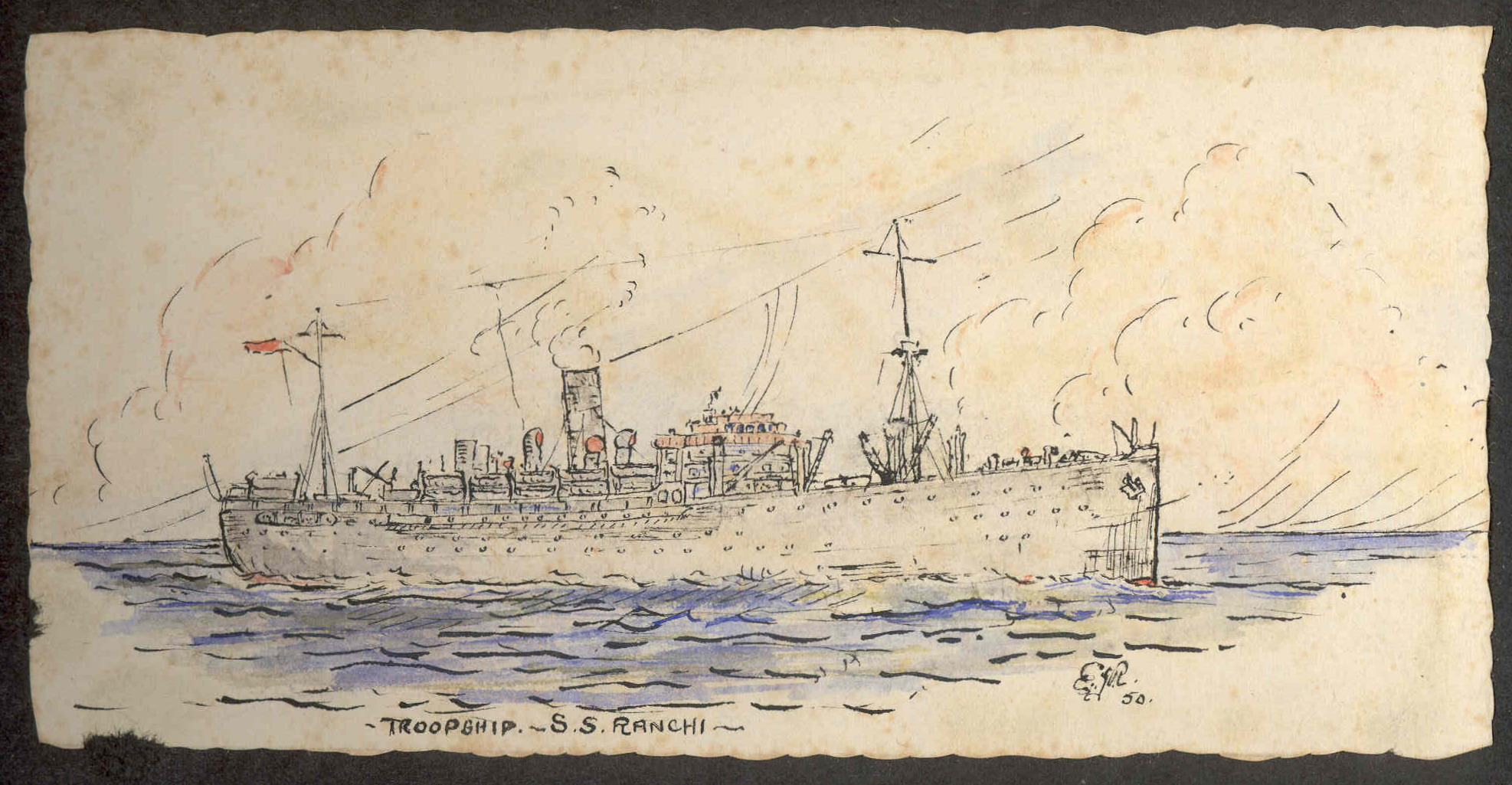
Pen and ink drawing of Ranchi by Eric Robinson, who served on her as a cadet in 1946

In Britain in November 1943 Ranchi embarked 3,542 troops for the Middle East. On 15 November she sailed from the Firth of Clyde in Convoy KMF 26. In the Mediterranean, early on 16 December, Heinkel He 111 aircraft based on Rhodes attacked the convoy. One bomb hit Ranchi's fo'c'sle, penetrated the troops' toilets and went out through the ship's side before exploding. One man was killed. The ship reached Alexandria where she underwent repairs that took 50 days.

Two months after the end of the Second World War in the Pacific, in October 1945 Ranchi sailed from Madras via Labuan and Singapore to Southampton carrying amongst others released prisoners of war and civilian internees recently liberated from Japanese camps. Hilda Bates, who had been interned in Batu Lintang camp at Kuching, Borneo, wrote on 23 October 1945: "We are now speeding towards England aboard the S.S. Ranchi, which is packed with troops and other ex P.O.W.s like ourselves ... In our cabin there are twelve women, – five of who[m] are returning home as widows."

== Post-war service ==
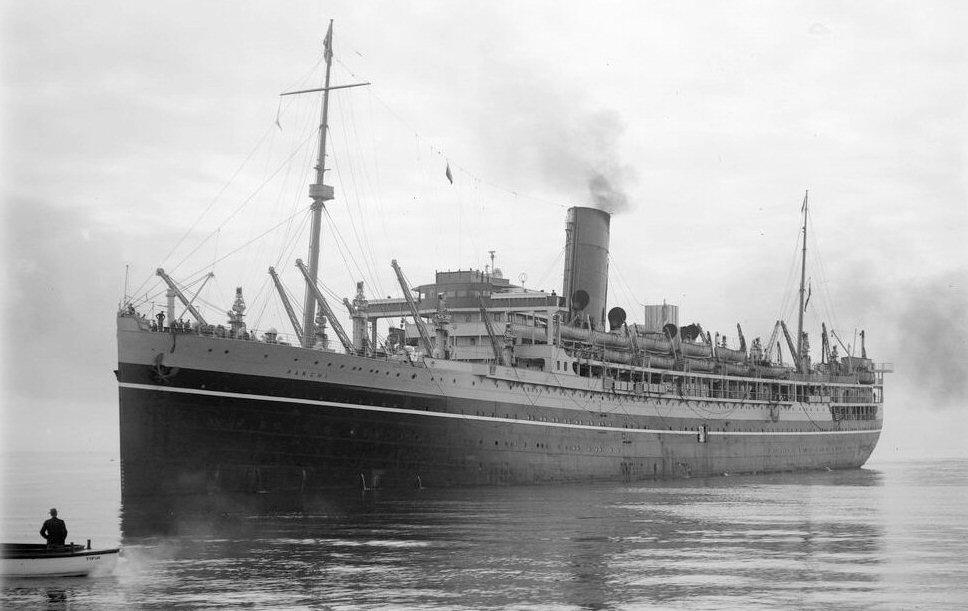
Ranchi after World War II, with her aft funnel removed

On 18 July 1947 the Ministry of Transport returned Ranchi to P&O. She was refitted at Southampton and London Docks. Her second funnel was removed, her hull was painted cream but her funnel was restored to traditional P&O black.

Singer Cliff Richard travelled to his parents native United Kingdom aboard Ranchi when his family left India in 1948.

Ranchi was used as an emigrant ship between June 1948 and 1952, when she completed 15 voyages from the United Kingdom to Australia. The shipping nominal rolls are held at the Victorian Public Records Office, Melbourne, Australia. Her first post war voyage was from Tilbury Docks on 17 June 1948, although her journey was delayed into Fremantle as there were rough seas off the coast of Western Australia.

Ranchi was broken up at Newport, Monmouthshire, beginning on 19 January 1953.

== In popular culture ==
In 1984 the P&O liner Canberra doubled for Ranchi in the final episode of Tenko, the BBC television drama series about civilian women interned by Japanese forces in the Far East.

The Blue Lotus, fifth volume of the comic book series The Adventures of Tintin, features an ocean liner named Ranchi that operates in Asia.

== Bibliography ==
- Harnack, Edwin P (1938) [1903]. All About Ships & Shipping (7th ed.). London: Faber and Faber. p. 561.
- Osborne, Richard; Spong, Harry; Grover, Tom (2007). Armed Merchant Cruisers 1878–1945. Windsor: World Warship Society. ISBN 978-0-9543310-8-5.
- Talbot-Booth, EC (1942) [1936]. Ships and the Sea (Seventh ed.). London: Sampson Low, Marston & Co. Ltd. pp. 351, 521, 522.
