= The Bottle (1915 film) =

1915 British film by Cecil Hepworth

- Directed by: Cecil M. Hepworth
- Produced by: Cecil M. Hepworth
- Starring: Albert Chevalier; Stewart Rome; Alma Taylor
- Production company: Hepworth Pictures
- Distributed by: Hepworth Pictures
- Release date: May 1915
- Running time: 3,000 feet
- Country: United Kingdom
- Languages: Silent; English intertitles

The Bottle is a 1915 British silent drama film directed by Cecil M. Hepworth and starring Albert Chevalier, Stewart Rome and Alma Taylor. It was based on a play by Arthur Shirley.

== Cast ==
- Albert Chevalier as Harry Ashford
- Ivy Millais as Mary Ashford
- Harry Brett as Jim Brewster
- Stewart Rome as Barman
- John MacAndrews
- Alma Taylor

== Bibliography ==
- Palmer, Scott. British Film Actors' Credits, 1895-1987. McFarland, 1988.
