= Elsie Mackay =

British actress (1893–1928)

The Honourable Lady Elsie Mackay
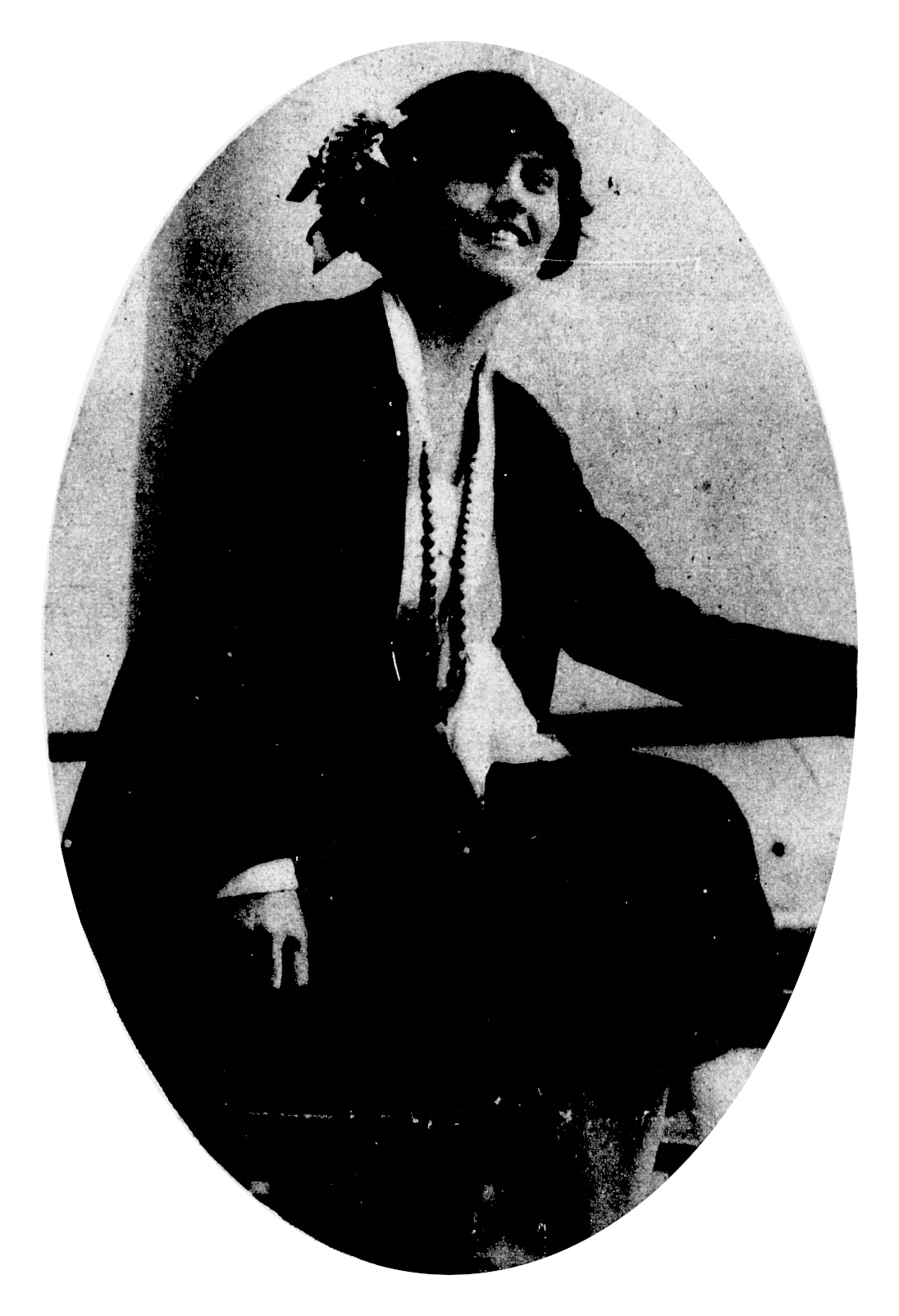
- Mackay in 1922
- Born: 1893; Simla, British India
- Died: 13 March 1928 (aged 34); Lost in the Atlantic Ocean
- Other names: Poppy Wyndham, Lady Elsie Mackay
- Occupations: Actress, Interior designer, Aviator
- Spouse: Dennis Wyndham (m. 1917; annul. 1922)

Lady Elsie Mackay (21 August 1893 – 13 March 1928) was a British actress, jockey, interior decorator and pioneering aviator who died attempting to cross the Atlantic Ocean with Walter Hinchliffe in a single engined Stinson Detroiter. Her stage name as an actress was Poppy Wyndham.

== Biography ==
Elsie Mackay was born on 21 August 1893 in Simla, West Bengal, India, to James Mackay, 1st Earl of Inchcape of Strathnaver, a British colonial administrator in India who became chairman of P&O and Jean Paterson Shanks. Her father was serving as President of the Bengal Chamber of Commerce, as a member of the Legislative Council of the Viceroy of India, and as a member of the Council of the Secretary of State for India.

She was reportedly disinherited by her family after eloping with actor Dennis Wyndham to be married on 23 May 1917. She appeared on the stage and screen as Poppy Wyndham from 1919 to 1921. This marriage was annulled in 1922.

As Poppy Wyndham she was the first woman jockey in England, and in her short career on the turf she piloted no less than a dozen winners under the barriers. In the few events from which her sex did not bar her, her colours - yellow and blue - were always present, and always were heavily backed.

== Filmography ==
Poppy Wyndham's film career included:

- A Great Coup (1919) as Kate Hampton
- Snow in the Desert (1919)
- Many a Slip (1919) as The Girl
- A Dead Certainty (1920) as Pat Stone
- The Town of Crooked Ways (1920) as Queenie Clay
- The Tidal Wave (1920) (as Carmen Hale / Columbine)
- A Son of David (1920) as Esther Raphael

== Interior design ==
After the marriage to Wyndham was annulled she returned to her family and developed a career as an interior decorator, creating lavish interiors, state rooms and public spaces for her father's shipping line, the P&O. In 1923 she launched the RMS Maloja, and went on to design much of the interiors for the four P&O "R" class ships of 1925: SS Rawalpindi, SS Ranchi, SS Ranpura and SS Rajputana, plus the RMS Viceroy of India in 1927.

== Flying ==
In 1923, she took up flying, gaining her pilot's licence at the De Havilland Flying School, probably the second woman since World War I after 'Mrs Atkey', bought a plane, and expressed a determination to be the first woman to fly the Atlantic. She was regarded as a contemporary role model amongst women, with dark looks, graceful manner, and a habitually well-dressed and bejewelled appearance. She was noted for driving her Rolls-Royce at great speed and was a familiar sight in her Avro biplane in the skies over South Ayrshire and Wigtownshire. She even participated in an "outside loop", the most dangerous of all stunts in air, with Capt. E. C. D. Herne as her pilot. During this manoeuvre her safety-strap broke but she clung to bracing wires while her body swung outside the plane like a stone twirled on the end of a piece of string. She was one of the first women in Britain to gain her Royal Aero Club pilot's licence and was later elected to the advisory committee of pilots to the British Empire Air League.

== Transatlantic flight ==
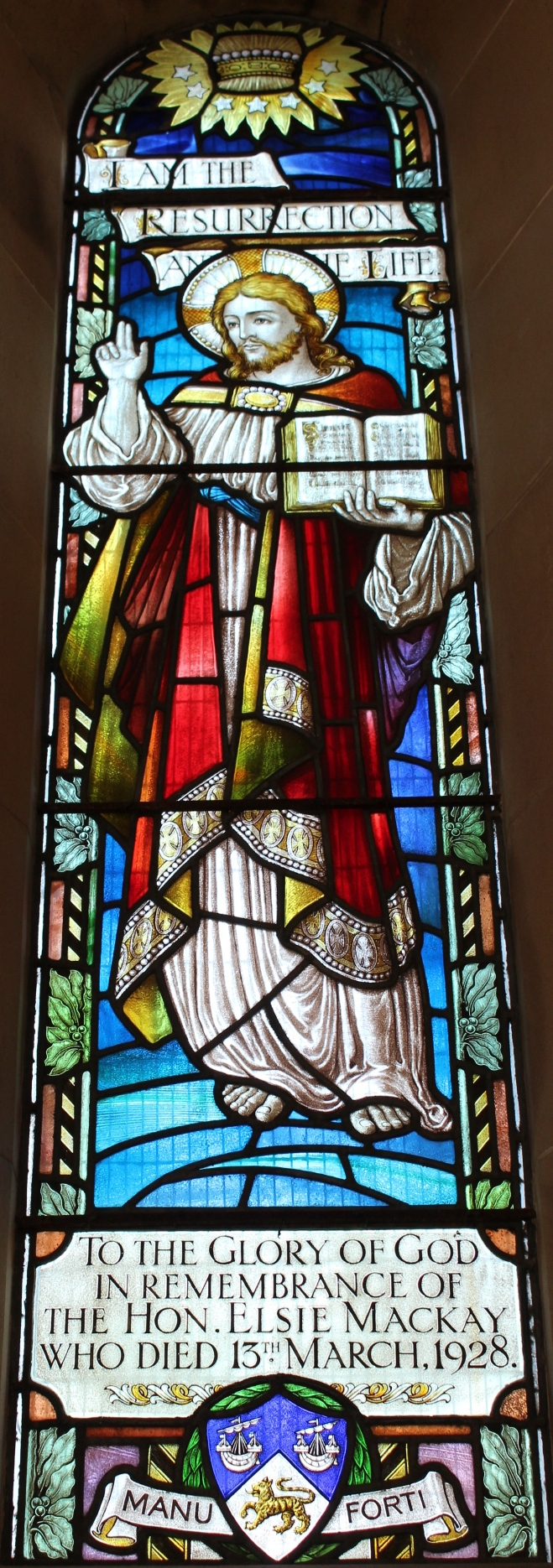
Window in remembrance of Elsie Mackay at Glenapp Church

To achieve her transatlantic ambition Mackay bought a Stinson Detroiter, having been impressed by the aircraft during Ruth Elder's failed 1927 transatlantic attempt (despite an oil leak causing the failure 300 miles (480 km) from the Azores over the Atlantic). It was shipped from the US to Britain and delivered to the Brooklands motor racing track, which at the time was also used as an airfield. She named it Endeavour. It was a monoplane with gold tipped wings and a black fuselage, powered by a nine-cylinder, 300 horsepower (220 kW) Wright Whirlwind J-6-9 (R-975) engine, with a cruising speed of 84 miles per hour (135 km/h).

In early March 1928, the Daily Express discovered that Captain Hinchliffe and Mackay were preparing for a transatlantic attempt by carrying out test flights at RAF Cranwell and were staying at the George Hotel in Leadenham near Grantham. The story was silenced by Mackay's threatened legal action as she intended to depart in secret while her father was in Egypt, having promised her family she would not make the attempt.

At 8:35 am on 13 March 1928, Endeavour took off from RAF Cranwell, Lincolnshire, with minimal fuss as Hinchliffe had told only two friends he was going and Elsie registered under the pseudonym of 'Gordon Sinclair'.' Approximately five hours later, at 1.30 pm the chief lighthouse keeper at Mizen Head on the south west coast of Cork, Ireland saw the monoplane over the village of Crookhaven. A French steamer later reported seeing them still on course, but nothing else is known. A crowd of 5,000 is reputed to have waited for them at Mitchel Field, Long Island. In December 1928, eight months later, a single piece of identifiable undercarriage (a wheel with a serial number on it) washed ashore in north west Ireland.

== Commemoration ==
Elsie Mackay is commemorated by a stained glass window in the chancel of Glenapp Church in the parish of Ballantrae, Ayrshire (where her father owned the Glenapp estate). Rhododendrons, now somewhat overgrown, spell out "Elsie" on the opposite side of the glen.(55.0288°N 5.014°W) A street is named after her in Gander, Newfoundland and Labrador. Her financial legacy was the Elsie Mackay Fund, a £500,000 trust bequeathed by her father that was left to the British nation on 12 December 1928, for 50 years and used to help pay off the national debt.

== See also ==
- Amelia Earhart
- Frances Wilson Grayson
- Amy Johnson
- List of people who disappeared mysteriously at sea
