= Alma Taylor =

British actress (1895–1974)

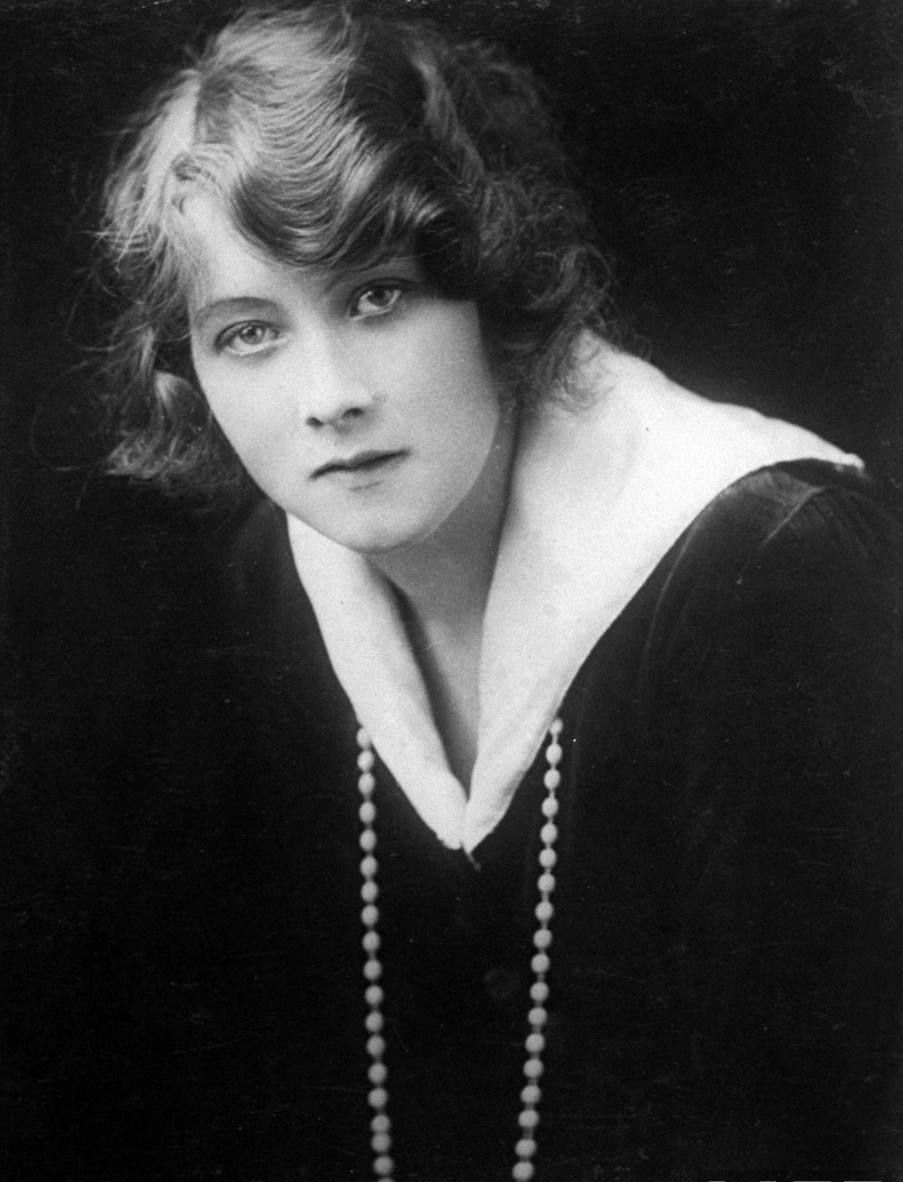
- Born: Alma Louise Taylor; 3 January 1895; London, England
- Died: 23 January 1974 (aged 79); London, England
- Years active: 1907–1958
- Spouse: Leonard Avery

Alma Louise Taylor (3 January 1895 – 23 January 1974) was a British actress.

== Life ==
Taylor was born in London. She made her first screen appearance as a child actor in the 1907 film His Daughter's Voice. She went on to appear in more than 150 film roles, appearing in a number of larger-budget films such as Shadow of Egypt which was shot on location in Egypt in 1924. Taylor was one of the major British stars of the 1910s and early 1920s. Most of her films were produced by Cecil Hepworth.

She is best remembered for her role as Tilly in the long-running Tilly the Tomboy series (1910-1915). In 1915 she was voted the most popular British performer by readers of Pictures and the Picturegoers, comfortably beating Charlie Chaplin into second place.

She acted only occasionally after 1932, appearing in films such as Lilacs in the Spring, Blue Murder at St Trinian's and A Night to Remember during the 1950s. On television, she appeared twice in Armchair Theatre, in 1957: she played Mrs. Castor and Greta Stenbourg.

She died in London at the age of 79.

== Selected filmography ==
Year	Title	Role	Notes
1907	His Daughter's Voice		Short
1910	The Burglar and Little Phyllis	Phyllis	Short
1911	Tilly at the Election	Tilly	Short
1912	Oliver Twist	Nancy	
1913	Adrift on Life's Tide	Edna Wilson	Short
1913	David Copperfield	Dora Spenlow	
1913	The Cloister and the Hearth	Margaret	
1914	Justice	Nan Prescott	
1914	The Heart of Midlothian	Madge Wildfire	
1914	The Old Curiosity Shop	Mrs. Quilp	
1915	The Baby on the Barge	Nelly Janis	Short
1915	The Golden Pavement	Brenda Crayle	
1915	The Man Who Stayed at Home	Molly Preston	
1915	Sweet Lavender	Ruth Rolfe	
1915	The Bottle		
1916	Molly Bawn	Eleanor Massareene	
1916	The Marriage of William Ashe	Lady Kitty Bristol	
1916	Trelawny of the Wells	Rose Trelawny	
1916	Sowing the Wind	Rosamond	
1916	The Grand Babylon Hotel	Princess Anna	
1916	Annie Laurie	Annie Laurie	Short
1917	The American Heiress	Bessie	Short
1917	Nearer My God to Thee	Joan	
1918	The Touch of a Child	Barbara Dell	
1918	The Leopard's Spots	The Woman	Short
1918	A New Version	The Woman	Short
1918	Boundary House	Jenny Gay	
1919	The Forest on the Hill	Drusilla Whyddon	
1919	Broken in the Wars	Lady Dorothea Hamlyn	Short
1919	Sunken Rocks	Evelyn Farrar	
1919	Sheba	Sheba	
1919	The Nature of the Beast	Anna de Berghem	
1920	Alf's Button	Liz	
1920	Helen of Four Gates	Helen	
1920	Mrs. Erricker's Reputation	Georgiana Erricker	
1921	The Narrow Valley	Victoria	
1921	Tansy	Tansy Firle	
1921	The Tinted Venus	Matilda Collum	
1921	Dollars in Surrey		
1923	The Pipes of Pan	Polly Bunning	
1923	Comin' Thro the Rye	Helen Adair	
1923	Mist in the Valley	Margaret Yeoland	
1923	Strangling Threads	Irma Brian	
1924	Shadow of Egypt	Lilian Westcott	
1926	The House of Marney	Beatrice Maxon	
1927	Quinneys	Susan Quinney	
1928	Two Little Drummer Boys	Alma Carsdale	
1928	A South Sea Bubble	Mary Ottery	
1929	The Night of Terror		
1929	The Hound of the Baskervilles	Eliza Barrymore	
1931	Deadlock	Mrs. Tring	
1932	Bachelor's Baby	Aunt Mary	
1935	Things Are Looking Up	Schoolmistress	Uncredited
1936	Everybody Dance	Rosemary Spurgeon	
1954	Lilacs in the Spring	1st Woman	
1955	Stock Car	Nurse Sprott	
1956	Lost	Mrs. Bellamy	Uncredited
1956	The Man Who Knew Too Much	Embassy Guest	Uncredited
1957	Blue Murder at St Trinian's	Prince Bruno's Mother	
1958	A Night to Remember	Old Lady	Final film role

== Bibliography ==
- Babington, Bruce. British stars and stardom: from Alma Taylor to Sean Connery. Manchester University Press, 2001.
