= Snow in the Desert =

1919 film

- Directed by: Walter West
- Written by: Andrew Soutar (story); Benedict James
- Starring: Violet Hopson; Stewart Rome; Poppy Wyndham
- Production company: Broadwest
- Distributed by: Walturdaw
- Release date: December 1919
- Country: United Kingdom
- Languages: Silent; English intertitles

Snow in the Desert is a 1919 British silent drama film directed by Walter West and starring Violet Hopson, Stewart Rome and Poppy Wyndham. The film featured an early performance from Ronald Colman before he went to Hollywood. It was based on a serialized story in the Daily Sketch by Andrew Soutar.

== Premise ==
A business tycoon's wife runs off with a poet, but returns to help run the company when her husband falls ill.

== Cast ==
- Violet Hopson as Felice Beste
- Stewart Rome as William B. Jackson
- Poppy Wyndham
- Simeon Stuart as Sir Michael Beste
- Ronald Colman as Rupert Sylvester
- Mary Masters
- A.B. Caldwell

== Bibliography ==
- Low, Rachael. History of the British Film, 1918–1929. George Allen & Unwin, 1971.
