= Violet Hopson =

British actress (1887–1973)

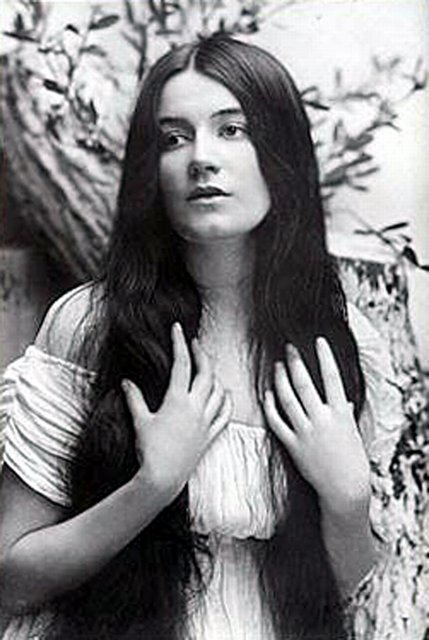
- Born: 16 December 1887; Port Augusta, Australia
- Died: 21 July 1973 (aged 85); Kensington, London, England
- Years active: 1910–1933

Violet Hopson (16 December 1887 – 21 July 1973) was an actress and producer who achieved fame on the British stage and in British silent films. Violet Hopson was her stage name, while in childhood she was known as Kate or Kitty to her family.

== Early life and career ==
She was born Elma Kate Victoria Karkeek in Port Augusta, South Australia on 16 December 1887.

Hopson's earliest stage experiences were several performances with Pollard’s Lilliputian Opera Company in Australia and New Zealand from 1898 to 1900. Her sisters Zoe Karkeek and Wilmot Karkeek were long standing members of this company from 1892. In the early 1900s she travelled to the United States with her older sister Zoe, and later to Britain.

British film historian Rachael Low has noted that Hopson was the first British actress to be exploited as a glamorous film star, despite a personality that made "little real impact" on the screen.

Her first British film was Mr Tubby's Triumph made in 1910. From 1912 she worked for Cecil Hepworth, along with Alma Taylor, Chrissie White, James Carew, Gerald Ames and John MacAndrews. Hepworth famously promoted her as a "Dear Delightful Villaness."

In early 1919 Hopson announced she was setting up her own production company – Violet Hopson Productions. Her first film as producer was the racing drama Heart and Saddles (aka The Gentleman Rider), with Stewart Rome. Her company also made the 1922 racing drama The Scarlett Lady. Other features were made for the company Broadwest, later Walter West Productions, all directed by Walter West. These included Snow in the Desert, A Great Coup, A Daughter of Eve, The Romance of a Movie Star, The Case of Lady Camber, Her Son, The Imperfect Lover, and When Greek Meets Greek.

A prolific actress with over 100 films to her credit made between 1912 and 1926, her career had already slowed before the arrival of sound films. She appeared in supporting roles in several sound films and then apparently retired.

== Personal life ==
She married actor Alec Worcester (also known as Alexander Howitt Worster), in Luton on 7 June 1909, when aged 21. Her marriage certificate gives her name as Elma Kate Victoria Hopson. The couple divorced in February 1919 on the grounds of his adultery and desertion.

The couple had two children; Nicholas born 1910 and Jessica born 1913. Hopson later married Walter West.

Often described as born in California, Hopson's acknowledgement of her Australian birth and upbringing seems rare. In February 1916, Pictures and the Picturegoer magazine reported her meeting her brother who was on leave, having been "with the Australians at the Dardanelles."

She died 21 July 1973 in Princess Louise Hospital, Kensington, London, the records naming her as Elma Kate Worster. She was cremated in Kensal Green Crematorium on 26 July 1973.

Her sister Wilmot Karkeek enjoyed a successful career on the stage in Britain between 1905 and 1915.

== Selected filmography ==
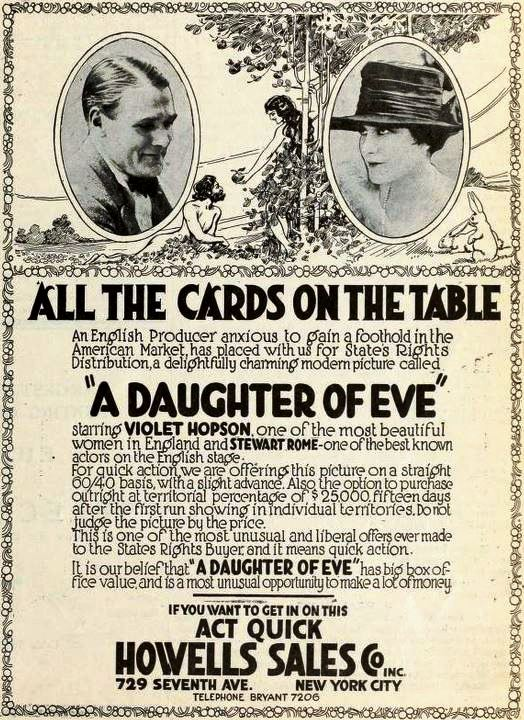
Violet Hopson with Stewart Rome in "A Daughter of Eve" (1919)

- The Jewel Thieves Outwitted (1913)
- The Vicar of Wakefield (1913)
- The Chimes (1914)
- The Heart of Midlothian (1914)
- Barnaby Rudge (1915)
- Sweet Lavender (1915)
- The Man Who Stayed at Home (1915)
- The Nightbirds of London (1915)
- Her Boy (1915)
- The Marriage of William Ashe (1916)
- Molly Bawn (1916)
- A Bunch of Violets (1916)
- Sowing the Wind (1916)
- The Grand Babylon Hotel (1916)
- Trelawny of the Wells (1916)
- The Ware Case (1917)
- A Gamble for Love (1917)
- The American Heiress (1917)
- The Ragged Messenger (1917)
- Her Marriage Lines (1917)
- The Woman Wins (1918)
- Missing the Tide (1918)
- Sisters in Arms (1918)
- A Fortune at Stake (1918)
- The Soul of Guilda Lois (1919)
- Snow in the Desert (1919)
- The Gentleman Rider (1919)
- The Irresistible Flapper (1919)
- A Daughter of Eve (1919)
- Her Son (1920)
- Kissing Cup's Race (1920)
- The Case of Lady Camber (1920)
- The Imperfect Lover (1921)
- A Sportsman's Wife (1921)
- Son of Kissing Cup (1922)
- The Scarlet Lady (1922)
- When Greek Meets Greek (1922)
- The Lady Owner (1923)
- Beautiful Kitty (1923)
- What Price Loving Cup? (1923)
- The Great Turf Mystery (1924)
- The Stirrup Cup Sensation (1924)
- A Daughter of Love (1925)
- Widecombe Fair (1928)
- Self Made Lady (1932)
- One Precious Year (1933)

== Bibliography ==
- Sweet, Matthew. Shepperton Babylon: The Lost Worlds of British Cinema. Faber and Faber, 2005.
