= The Gentleman Rider =

- Directed by: Walter West
- Starring: Violet Hopson; Stewart Rome; Gregory Scott
- Production company: Violet Hopson Productions
- Distributed by: Walturdaw
- Release date: October 1919
- Country: United Kingdom
- Languages: Silent; English intertitles

The Gentleman Rider is a 1919 British silent sports drama film directed by Walter West and starring Violet Hopson, Stewart Rome and Gregory Scott.

== Cast ==
- Violet Hopson as Marjorie Denton
- Stewart Rome as Frank Cunningham
- Gregory Scott as Sir Reginald Buckley
- Cameron Carr as Billbrook
- Violet Elliott as Aunt Cynthia

== Bibliography ==
- Palmer, Scott. British Film Actors' Credits, 1895-1987. McFarland, 1998.
