= SS Ranpura =

British ocean liner (1924–1961)

History

United Kingdom
- Builder: R. & W. Hawthorn Leslie and Company
- Launched: 13 September 1924
- Acquired: September 1939
- Commissioned: December 1939
- Reclassified: Armed merchant cruiser
- Fate: Broken up in 1961

General characteristics
- Tonnage: 16,583 gross register tons; 8755 deadweight tons
- Length: 547 ft (167 m)
- Beam: 71 ft (22 m)
- Propulsion: quad expansion steam engine
- Speed: 17 knots (31 km/h)
- Complement: 323 (as armed cruiser)
- Armament: 8 × 6 in (152 mm); 2 × 3 in (76 mm) (76.2 mm)
- Armor: none

The SS Ranpura was a British passenger and cargo carrying ocean liner built by R. & W. Hawthorn Leslie and Company at Newcastle upon Tyne for the Peninsular & Oriental Steam Navigation Company in 1924. She was the first of the P&O 'R' class liners that had much of their interiors designed by Lord Inchcape's daughter Elsie Mackay. She was launched 13 September 1924 and sponsored by C.C. Straker, wife of the chairman of Hawthorn Leslie and Company.

In 1936, she was assigned to transport $50 million (1936 prices) worth of Chinese artwork from London to Shanghai. The art had been on display in England as part of the largest exhibit of Chinese art to appear in England to that point. On 14 April, she encountered a storm off Gibraltar and ran aground in the Punta Mala after dragging anchor. She was refloated without damage on 16 April and resumed her trip to China.

She was requisitioned into the Royal Navy on the onset of World War II and finished conversion 30 November 1939 as the armed merchant cruiser HMS Ranpura. The installation of eight six-inch guns gave her the firepower of a light cruiser without the armoured protection.

== World War II ==
Her sister ships SS Rawalpindi, SS Ranchi and SS Rajputana were also converted to armed merchant cruisers. Except for small corvettes, the converted passenger ships like HMS Ranpura were the only armed protection for most of the early convoys. With their six-inch (152 mm) guns, they were the only escorts that could engage German surface ships. After conversion, Ranpura was assigned to the Mediterranean, where she served until February 1940, when she was transferred to the South Atlantic. She served with the Halifax Escort Force in May 1940, then was assigned in March 1941 as part of the force transferring gold from Britain to Canada for safekeeping during the war. After October 1941, she transferred to the Indian Ocean.

HMS Ranpura (F93) was sold to the Admiralty in 1943 and converted to a repair ship. She served in the Royal Navy as a fleet depot ship until 1961, when she was broken up. She took part in the 1956 Suez Crisis.

== Bibliography ==
- Osborne, Richard; Spong, Harry; Grover, Tom (2007). Armed Merchant Cruisers 1878–1945. Windsor, UK: World Warship Society. ISBN 978-0-9543310-8-5.
