= The Old Curiosity Shop (1913 film) =

- Directed by: Thomas Bentley
- Written by: Charles Dickens (novel); Thomas Bentley
- Starring: Mai Deacon; Warwick Buckland; Alma Taylor
- Production company: Hepworth Pictures
- Release date: December 1913
- Running time: 6 reels
- Country: United Kingdom
- Language: English

The Old Curiosity Shop is a 1913 British silent drama film directed by Thomas Bentley and starring Mai Deacon, Warwick Buckland and Alma Taylor. It was based on the 1841 novel The Old Curiosity Shop by Charles Dickens, and was the first of three film adaptations of the story by Bentley. It was made by the Hepworth Company, the leading British film studio before the First World War.

== Cast ==
- Mai Deacon as Little Nell
- Warwick Buckland as Grandfather Trent
- E. Felton as Quilp
- Alma Taylor as Mrs. Quilp
- Jamie Darling as The Single Gentleman
- Willie West as Dick Swiveller
- Billy Rex as Tom Codlin
- S. May as Sampson Brass
- Bert Stowe as Short
- Sydney Locklynne as Jerry
- Moya Nugent as Marchioness
- R. Phillips as Mrs. Jarley

== Bibliography ==
- Giddings, Robert & Sheen, Erica. From Page To Screen: Adaptations of the Classic Novel . Manchester University Press, 5 May 2000
- Mee, John. The Cambridge Introduction to Charles Dickens. Cambridge University Press, 2010.
