= Her Son =

1920 film

Her Son is a 1920 British silent drama film directed by Walter West and starring Violet Hopson, Stewart Rome and Mercy Hatton. It was based on the 1907 novel Her Son by Horace Annesley Vachell.

== Cast ==
- Violet Hopson - Dorothy Fairfax
- Stewart Rome - Dick Gascoyne
- Mercy Hatton - Crystal Wride
- Cameron Carr - David Hesseltine
- John Stuart - Min Gascoyne
- Mary Masters - Susan
- Nicholas Hopson Worster - Min, as a child
