= The American Heiress =

1917 British silent film by Cecil M. Hepworth

- Directed by: Cecil M. Hepworth
- Written by: Blanche McIntosh
- Produced by: Cecil M. Hepworth
- Starring: Alma Taylor; Violet Hopson; Stewart Rome
- Production company: Hepworth Picture Plays
- Distributed by: Harma Photoplays
- Release date: January 1917
- Running time: 3 reels
- Country: United Kingdom
- Languages: Silent; English intertitles

The American Heiress is a 1917 British silent crime film directed by Cecil M. Hepworth and starring Alma Taylor, Violet Hopson and Stewart Rome.

== Plot ==
A maid dresses and poses as an heiress - and is kidnapped by thieves. She then is saved by the butler.

== Cast ==
- Alma Taylor as Bessie
- Violet Hopson as Cynthia Hunks
- Stewart Rome as Parker
- Lionelle Howard as Bob Summers
- John MacAndrews as Viper Smith
- Johnny Butt as Sir John Higgins

== Bibliography ==
- Wintour, Barry. Britain and the Great War, 1914-1918: A Subject Bibliography of Some Selected Aspects. Greenengle publishing, 2014.
