= The Woman Wins =

1918 film directed by Frank Wilson

- Directed by: Frank Wilson
- Release date: 1918
- Country: United Kingdom
- Language: Silent

The Woman Wins is a 1918 British silent crime film directed by Frank Wilson and starring Violet Hopson, Trevor Bland and Cameron Carr. It was based on a novel by Cecil Bullivant.

== Cast ==
- Violet Hopson – Brenda Marsh
- Trevor Bland – Hugh Fraser
- Cameron Carr – Raymond Vascour
- George Dewhurst – Hadley Barfield
- Arthur Walcott – John Farley
- Henry S. Creagh – Justin Marsh
- J. Hastings Batson – Admiral Fraser
- Vera Cornish – Mrs. Fane
