= Son of Kissing Cup =

1922 film

- Directed by: Walter West
- Written by: Campbell Rae Brown (story); J. Bertram Brown
- Starring: Violet Hopson; Stewart Rome; Cameron Carr
- Production company: Broadwest
- Distributed by: Butcher's Film Service
- Release date: August 1922
- Country: United Kingdom
- Languages: Silent; English intertitles

Son of Kissing Cup is a 1922 British silent sports film directed by Walter West and starring Violet Hopson, Stewart Rome and Cameron Carr. Like many of West's films it is set in the world of horseracing.

== Cast ==
- Violet Hopson as Constance Medley
- Stewart Rome
- Cameron Carr
- Arthur Walcott

== See also ==
- List of films about horses
- List of films about horse racing

== Bibliography ==
- Low, Rachael. The History of the British Film 1918-1929. George Allen & Unwin, 1971.
