= The Winged Horse =

1932 film

- Oswald meets the Winged Horse.
- Directed by: Walter Lantz; Bill Nolan
- Produced by: Walter Lantz
- Starring: Joe E. Brown
- Music by: James Dietrich
- Animation by: Ray Abrams; Fred Avery; Bill Weber; Vet Anderson; Bunny Ellison
- Color process: Black and white
- Production company: Walter Lantz Productions
- Distributed by: Universal Pictures
- Release date: May 9, 1932
- Running time: 7:49
- Language: English

The Winged Horse, also known by its reissue title of The Wing Horse, is a theatrical short cartoon by Walter Lantz Productions, featuring Oswald the Lucky Rabbit. It is the 59th Oswald short produced by Lantz's studio and the 112th to feature the character.

== Plot ==
Oswald is riding on an elephant, exploring a city in the Middle East. Joining him is a female teddy bear dancing inside a booth which is also on the elephant. Suddenly, the teddy bear's booth snags onto a hook of an overhead bar. In no time, a saluki, who wears a turban and rides a camel, comes by and takes her. But because Oswald isn't too far away, the rabbit hears her distress call, and reverses direction. Not wanting Oswald to intervene, the saluki also charges forth.

When Oswald's elephant and the saluki's camel collide head on, the riders are thrown off and are unconscious for a few moments. While the elephant and the camel fight over the crash, the saluki recovers quickly, picks up the teddy bear, finds a flying carpet, and takes off. Oswald momentarily awakes, but it is too late. A chance for the rabbit to get back his partner is found when he spots a stallion with wings inside a shop. Although the horse is very frail at first, Oswald is able to get the stallion into shape on time before finally flying.

Up in the skies, the saluki is still on the carpet with the teddy bear. Surprisingly, Oswald and the stallion catch up from behind. The saluki then conjures a rifle, and manages to fire a few shots. When the teddy bear intervenes several times, the saluki, who is no longer interested in her, kicks the bruin off the carpet. Oswald and the stallion dive to catch her in mid-air. The saluki resumes firing the rifle until a shot is landed. Despite going down after being struck, the stallion is able to get back as the horse bites on and tears the carpet apart. All four of them start to plunge.

Back on the ground, Oswald's elephant and the saluki's camel are still pummeling each other over the collision incident. Just then, Oswald, the teddy bear, the saluki, and the horse drop on them. When the dust clears, Oswald and the teddy bear are both in one piece. But the saluki, stallion, elephant, and camel somehow fuse bodies. The rabbit and the bruin then continue the exploration, riding on their new conjoined creatures.

== See also ==
- List of films about horses
