= Stakes (2015 film) =

- Film poster
- Directed by: Richard Owen
- Starring: Olivia Glynn; Kaily Smith; Justin Sheridan; Adam Drummond; Ty Butler; William Turner; Renee Pallister; Brad Clark; Rob Minister
- Cinematography: Alexis Castagna
- Music by: Ric Formosa
- Distributed by: 330 Media
- Release date: 29 October 2015
- Running time: 93 minutes
- Country: Australia
- Language: English
- Budget: $500,000

Stakes is a 2015 Australian drama film directed by Richard Owen. It follows the journey of a young aspiring thoroughbred trainer to fill the shoes of her recently deceased father, while battling a corrupt establishment, fraught with unethical competitors and submersed in the criminal element of the horse racing industry. The film stars many local actors from the Riverina region. It is the second feature film to be set in the city of Wagga Wagga.

== Production ==
The film was predominantly shot in Wagga Wagga, though some scenes were shot in Albury and Junee. It was filmed over 6–8 months in 2014 and was set to be released in time for the 2014 Melbourne Cup in October, however, it was pushed back to the following year's Melbourne Cup.

== Release ==
Stakes premiered 29 October 2015 at The Arts Centre Gold Coast and in the city of Wagga Wagga. The film was released simultaneously in cinemas around Australia.

== See also ==
- List of films about horses
- List of films about horse racing
