= The Stirrup Cup Sensation =

1924 film

- Directed by: Walter West
- Written by: Campbell Rae Brown; J. Bertram Brown
- Starring: Violet Hopson; Stewart Rome; Cameron Carr
- Distributed by: Butcher's Film Service
- Release date: September 1924
- Country: United Kingdom
- Languages: Silent; English intertitles

The Stirrup Cup Sensation is a 1924 British silent sports film directed by Walter West and starring Violet Hopson, Stewart Rome, and Cameron Carr.

== Cast ==
- Violet Hopson as Eileen Chelverley
- Stewart Rome as Honorable Jack Bellenden
- Cameron Carr as Paul Frensham
- Judd Green as Lord Bellenden
- Fred Hearne as Arthur Rowlandson
- Bob Vallis as Nat Monday
- James Strackey as Joyce

== See also ==
- List of films about horses
- List of films about horse racing

== Bibliography ==
- Low, Rachael. The History of the British Film 1918-1929. George Allen & Unwin, 1971.
