= The Soul of Guilda Lois =

- Directed by: Frank Wilson
- Written by: Newman Flower (novel); Kenelm Foss
- Produced by: Walter West
- Starring: Violet Hopson; Basil Gill; Cameron Carr
- Production company: Broadwest
- Distributed by: Granger Films
- Release date: January 1919
- Country: United Kingdom
- Languages: Silent; English intertitles

The Soul of Guilda Lois is a 1919 British silent drama film directed by Frank Wilson and starring Violet Hopson, Basil Gill and Cameron Carr. It is based on a novel by Newman Flower and is often known by the alternative title of A Soul's Crucifixion.

== Cast ==
- Violet Hopson as Guilda Lois
- Basil Gill as Julian Neave
- Cameron Carr as Paul Brian
- Richard Buttery as Dicky Tremayne
- Clifford Pembroke as Major Hardene
- J. Hastings Batson as Gregoire
- Hilda Bayley

== Bibliography ==
- Low, Rachael. History of the British Film, 1918-1929. George Allen & Unwin, 1971.
