= The Scarlet Lady (1922 film) =

1922 film

- Directed by: Walter West
- Written by: J. Bertram Brown
- Starring: Violet Hopson; Louis Willoughby; Cameron Carr
- Production company: Violet Hopson Productions
- Release date: March 1922
- Country: United Kingdom
- Languages: Silent; English intertitles

The Scarlet Lady is a 1922 British silent sports drama film directed by Walter West and starring Violet Hopson, Louis Willoughby and Cameron Carr.

== Cast ==
- Violet Hopson as Gwendoline Gordon
- Louis Willoughby as Martin Strong
- Cameron Carr as Henry Wingate
- Arthur Walcott as Mark Worth
- Adeline Hayden Coffin as Aunt Priscilla

== See also ==
- List of films about horses

== Bibliography ==
- Low, Rachael. The History of the British Film 1918-1929. George Allen & Unwin, 1971.
