= Her Boy (1915 film) =

- Directed by: Frank Wilson
- Written by: Gertrude Allen
- Starring: Stewart Rome; Violet Hopson; Lionelle Howard
- Production company: Hepworth Pictures
- Distributed by: Thanhouser Company
- Release date: September 1915
- Country: United Kingdom
- Languages: Silent; English intertitles

Her Boy is a 1915 British silent drama film directed by Frank Wilson and starring Stewart Rome, Violet Hopson and Lionelle Howard.

== Plot ==
A reckless gambler loses both his mother and his wife's money.

== Cast ==
- Stewart Rome as Hugh Vane
- Violet Hopson as Nance
- Lionelle Howard as Eric
- Chrissie White as Isabelle

== Bibliography ==
- Palmer, Scott. British Film Actors' Credits, 1895-1987. McFarland, 1988. ISBN 978-0-89950-316-5.
