= Cameron Carr (actor) =

English actor (1876–1944)

- Born: 13 May 1876; Kingston-Upon-Thames, Surrey, England, UK
- Died: 8 July 1944; Kingston upon Thames, Surrey, England, UK
- Occupation: Actor
- Spouse(s): Jessie Dyer and Mabel Louise Brown

Cameron Carr (1876–1944) was an English actor of the silent era.

== Selected filmography ==
- The Woman Wins (1918)
- Nature's Gentleman (1918)
- A Great Coup (1919)
- The Soul of Guilda Lois (1919)
- A Daughter of Eve (1919)
- The Gentleman Rider (1919)
- Under Suspicion (1919)
- Trent's Last Case (1920)
- Her Son (1920)
- The Romance of a Movie Star (1920)
- A Rank Outsider (1920)
- The Imperfect Lover (1921)
- The Penniless Millionaire (1921)
- The Loudwater Mystery (1921)
- Fox Farm (1922)
- A Maid of the Silver Sea (1922)
- Boy Woodburn (1922)
- The Scarlet Lady (1922)
- Son of Kissing Cup (1922)
- The Uninvited Guest (1923)
- Out to Win (1923)
- The Stirrup Cup Sensation (1924)
- The Gay Corinthian (1924)
- The Great Well (1924)
- The Notorious Mrs. Carrick (1924)
- The House of Marney (1926)
- Poppies of Flanders (1927)
- The Rolling Road (1927)
- The Blue Peter (1928)
- The W Plan (1930)
- On Thin Ice (1933)
