= The Pipes of Pan =

Song composed by Edward Elgar

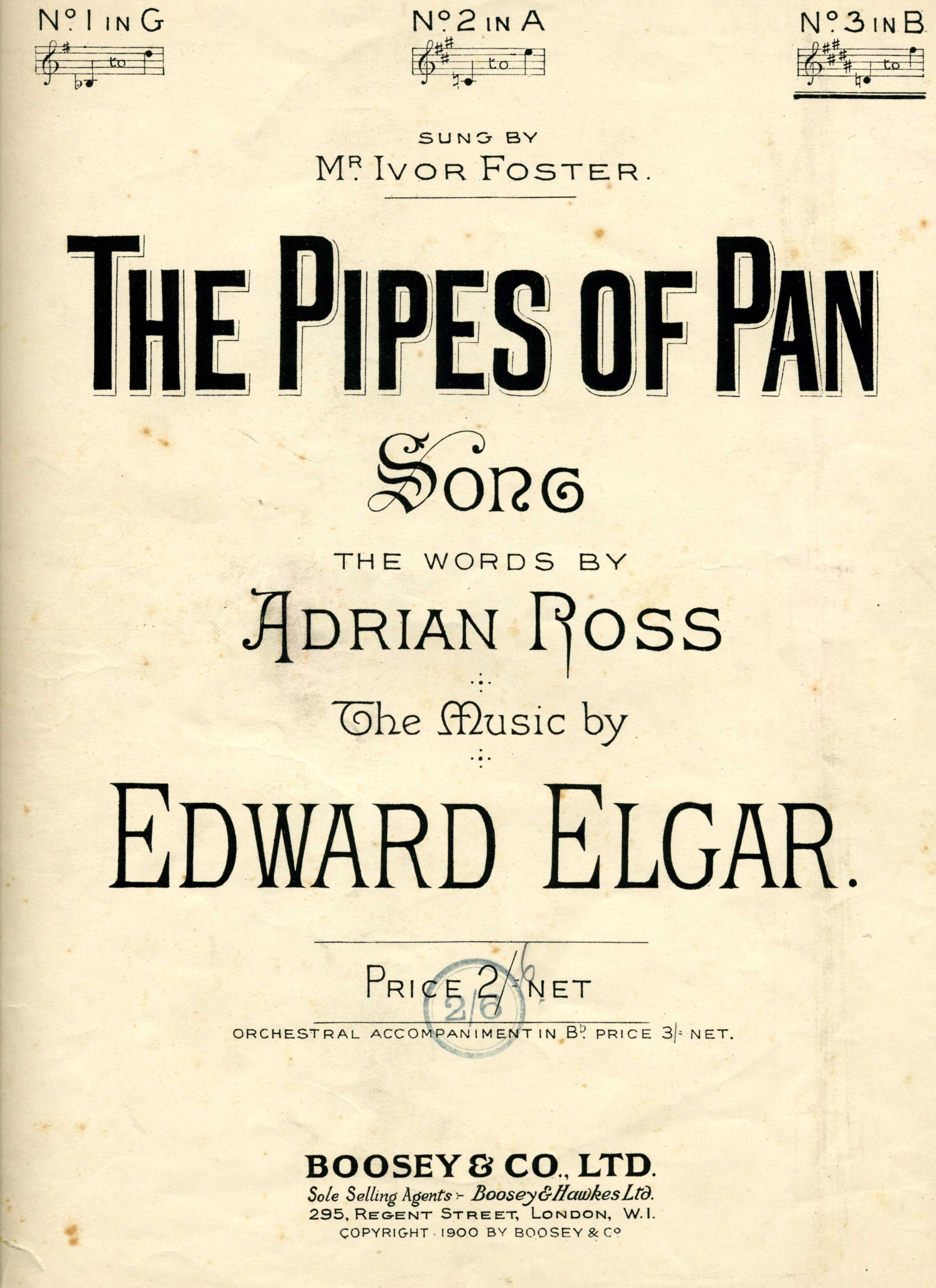

"The Pipes of Pan" is a poem by Adrian Ross set to music by the English composer Edward Elgar, being completed on 5 June 1899.

The song was published by Boosey in 1900. The first performance was by 'Miss Blouvelt' at the Crystal Palace on 30 April 1900. Elgar also arranged the song accompaniment for orchestra, which was first sung by Andrew Black at the Queen's Hall on 12 May 1900.

Early editions of the vocal score are inscribed 'Sung by Mr. Ivor Foster'; Foster was a popular opera and, particularly, concert singer of the day whose credits included participating in Boosey's series of ballad concerts.

== Lyrics ==
THE PIPES OF PAN

When the woods are gay in the time of June

With the Chestnut flow’r and fan,

And the birds are still in the hush of noon, -

Hark to the pipes of Pan !

He plays on the reed that once was a maid

Who broke from his arms and ran,

And her soul goes out to the list’ning glade -

Hark to the pipes of Pan !

Though you hear, come not near,

Fearing the wood-god’s ban;

Soft and sweet, in the dim retreat,

Hark to the pipes of Pan !

When the sun goes down and the stars are out,

He gathers his goat-foot clan,

And the Dryads dance with the Satyr rout;

Hark to the pipes of Pan !

For he pipes the dance of the happy Earth

Ere ever the gods began,

When the woods were merry and mad with mirth -

Hark to the pipes of Pan !

Come not nigh, pass them by,

Woe to the eyes that scan !

Wild and loud to the leaping crowd,

Hark to the pipes of Pan !

When the armies meet on the battle field,

And the fight is man to man,

With the gride of sword and the clash of shield -

Hark to the pipes of Pan !

Thro’ the madden’d shriek of the flying rear,

Thro’ the roar of the charging van,

There skirls the tune of the God of Fear -

Hark to the pipes of Pan !

Ours the fray – on and slay,

Let him escape that can !

Ringing out in the battle shout,

Hark to the pipes of Pan !

== Recordings ==
- Songs and Piano Music by Edward Elgar has "The Pipes of Pan" performed by Peter Savidge (baritone), with David Owen Norris (piano).
- The Songs of Edward Elgar SOMM CD 220 Christopher Maltman (baritone) with Malcolm Martineau (piano), at Southlands College, London, April 1999
