= Sowing the Wind (play) =

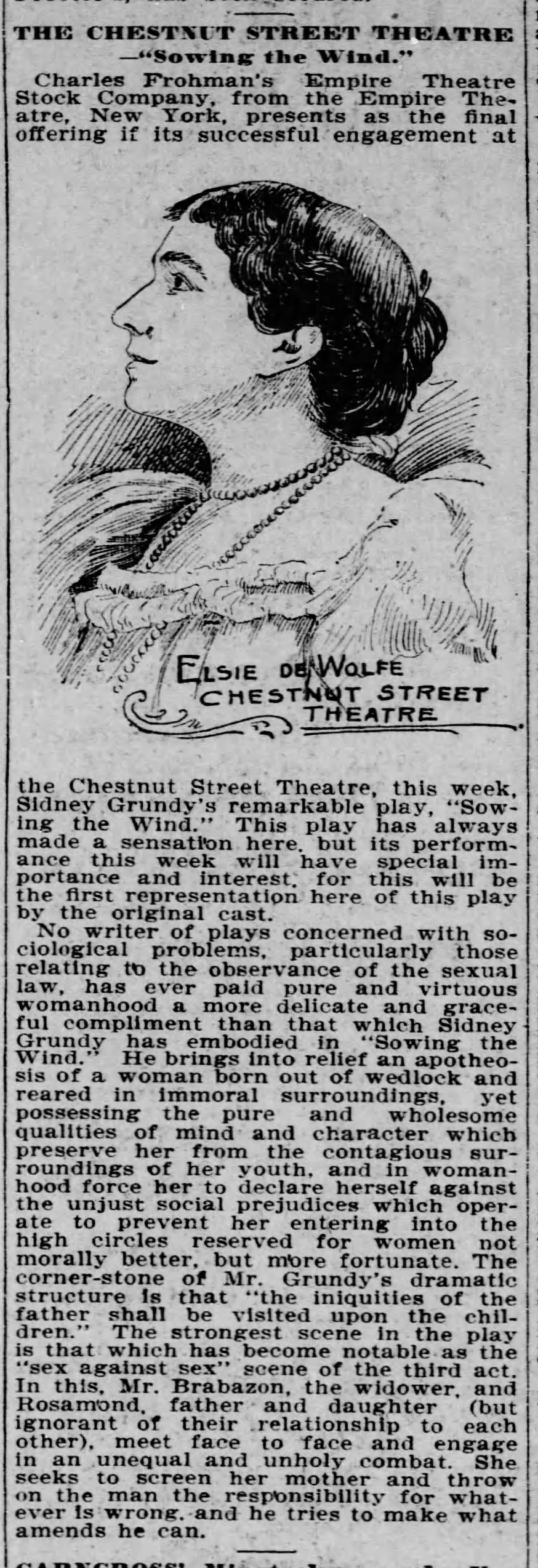
1895 ad for play at Chestnut Street Theatre featuring Elsie de Wolfe

Sowing the Wind is an 1893 play by the British writer Sydney Grundy. The play had a run of over 200 nights in 1894, when it was presented at the Empire Theatre in New York City. The play created controversy in England when it was staged there, with the Reverend Dr. Boyd, vice-chancellor of the University of Oxford, forbidding "any further representations of the play within the university jurisdiction". Grundy responded to Boyd, stating: "To laymen at the end of the nineteenth century, it seems a bit medieval, this extreme care for the morals of a set of young gentlemen who find compensation for six months' abstinence at Oxford by six months' indulgence at music halls in London and elsewhere. Perhaps Dr. Boyd is attempting to secure for his charges a fair yearly average".

== Synopsis ==
Mr. Brabazon, a wealthy widower, past middle age, had in his younger days formed an alliance which had been brought to an end by the apparently friend efforts of an old crony, Mr. Watkins, who had told him that the woman with whom he had become entangled was disloyal. After this, Brabazon married, becoming subsequently a widower, and regretting that he had neither son nor daughter to comfort him in the evening of his life.

Thereupon he adopts Ned Annesley, the son of an old friend. Deeply interested in the fortunes of Annesley, he had hoped the young man would marry a Miss Maud Fretwell. These hopes were frustrated, as Ned had formed an attachment for Rosamond, a young lady who had attained celebrity as a singer. Rosamond calls upon Brabazon to solicit his patronage for her concert, when she encounters Annesley, and it then comes out that they are betrothed. Brabazon, by means of Watkins, makes inquiries as to Rosamond's antecedents, and though she is a victim of scandals which are afterward proven unfounded, it is made plain that her birth is illegitimate.

So Brabazon refuses his consent. At the close of the third act, he learns that Rosamond is his own child, and also that the woman whom he believed faithless was true to her love for him. Rosamond, though prizing Annesley as the one man whose intentions towards here have been honorable, at first refuses to marry him on the plea that her birth would degrade him. In the end Brabazon reveals herself to Rosamond as her father, asks her forgiveness, and consents to the marriage.

== Reviews ==
An 1895 review of the play from The Philadelphia Inquirer at Chestnut Street Theatre.

No writer of plays concerned with sociological problems, particularly those relating to the observance of the sexual law, has ever paid pure and virtuous womanhood a more delicate and graceful compliment than that which Sidney Grundy has embodies in 'Sowing the Wind'. He brings into relief an apotheosis of a woman born out of wedlock and reared in immoral surroundings, yet possessing the pure and wholesome qualities of mind and character which preserve her from the contagious surroundings of her youth, and in womanhood force her to declare herself against the unjust social prejudices which operate to prevent her entering into the high circles reserved for women not morally better, but more fortunate.

The cornerstone of Mr. Grundy's dramatic structure is that "the iniquities of the father shall be visited upon the children". The strongest scene in the play is that which has become notable is the "sex against sex" scene of the third act. In this, Mr. Brabazon, the widower and Rosamond, father and daughter (but ignorant of their relationship to each other), meet face to face and engage in an unequal and unholy combat. She seeks to screen her mother and thrown on the man the responsibility for whatever is wrong, and he tries to make what amends he can.

== Film adaptations ==
In 1916 the play was turned into a British silent film Sowing the Wind. In 1921 an American version Sowing the Wind was also made.

== Bibliography ==
- Goble, Alan. The Complete Index to Literary Sources in Film. Walter de Gruyter, 1999.
