= Sowing the Wind (1916 film) =

- Directed by: Cecil Hepworth
- Written by: Sydney Grundy (play); Blanche McIntosh
- Produced by: Cecil Hepworth
- Starring: Henry Ainley; Alma Taylor; Stewart Rome
- Production company: Hepworth Pictures
- Distributed by: Hepworth Pictures
- Release date: May 1916
- Running time: 5 reels
- Country: United Kingdom
- Languages: Silent; English intertitles

Sowing the Wind is a 1916 British silent romance film directed by Cecil Hepworth and starring Henry Ainley, Alma Taylor and Stewart Rome. It is based on the play Sowing the Wind by Sydney Grundy.

== Cast ==
- Henry Ainley as Tom Brabazon
- Alma Taylor as Rosamond
- Stewart Rome as Ned Annersley
- Violet Hopson as Helen Gray
- Chrissie White as Maude Fretwell
- Lionelle Howard as Bob Watkin
- Charles Vane as Lord Petworth
- Percy Manton as Sir Richard Cursitor

== Bibliography ==
- Goble, Alan. The Complete Index to Literary Sources in Film. Walter de Gruyter, 1999.
