= Stewart Rome =

English actor (1886–1965)

- Born: Septimus William Ryott; 30 January 1886; Newbury, Berkshire, England
- Died: 26 February 1965 (aged 79); Newbury, Berkshire, England
- Years active: 1913–1950

Stewart Rome (born Septimus William Ryott; 30 January 1886 – 26 February 1965) was an English actor who appeared in more than 150 films between 1913 and 1950.

He was born in Newbury, Berkshire in 1886 and took the stage name of Stewart Rome, which was later unsuccessfully contested by Cecil Hepworth, who also used the name. He became a major star in the silent era.

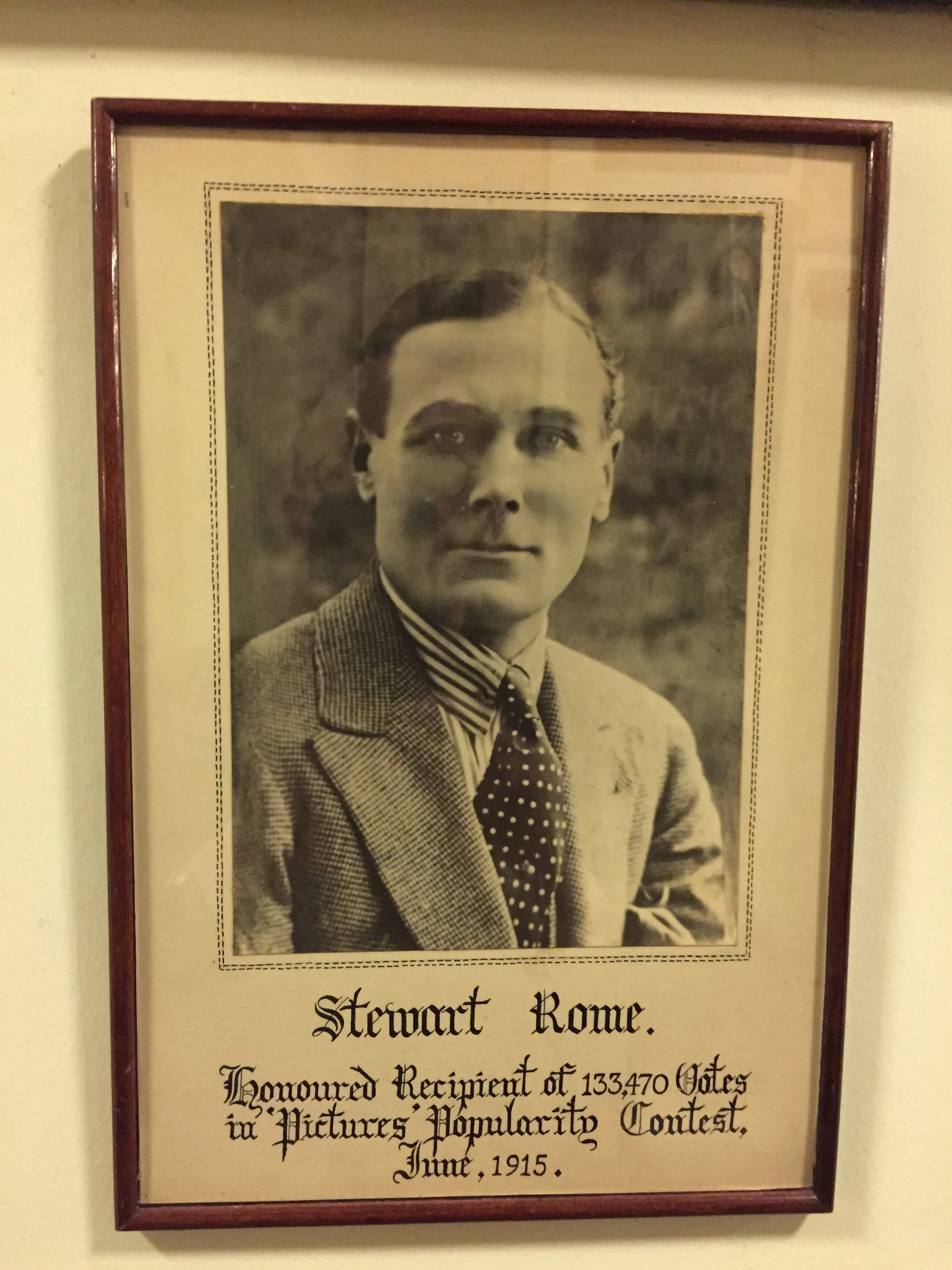
Popularity certificate from 1915 from The Cinema Museum London

== Partial filmography ==
- The Heart of Midlothian (1914)
- The Chimes (1914)
- Justice (1914)
- The Nightbirds of London (1915)
- Barnaby Rudge (1915)
- The Baby on the Barge (1915)
- Her Boy (1915)
- Sweet Lavender (1915)
- The Bottle (1915)
- The Golden Pavement (1915)
- Molly Bawn (1916)
- Sowing the Wind (1916)
- Trelawny of the Wells (1916)
- The Marriage of William Ashe (1916)
- The House of Fortescue (1916)
- The White Boys (1916)
- Annie Laurie (1916)
- The Grand Babylon Hotel (1916)
- The Man Behind 'The Times' (1917)
- The American Heiress (1917)
- Her Marriage Lines (1917)
- The Cobweb (1917)
- A Grain of Sand (1917)
- A Great Coup (1919)
- A Daughter of Eve (1919)
- Snow in the Desert (1919)
- The Gentleman Rider (1919)
- Her Son (1920)
- The Case of Lady Camber (1920)
- The Imperfect Lover (1921)
- Her Penalty (1921)
- The Penniless Millionaire (1921)
- In Full Cry (1921)
- Son of Kissing Cup (1922)
- When Greek Meets Greek (1922)
- The Prodigal Son (1923)
- The Uninvited Guest (1923)
- Ferragus (1923)
- The Woman Who Obeyed (1923)
- Fires of Fate (1923)
- The Shadow of the Mosque (1923)
- Reveille (1924)
- The Desert Sheik (1924)
- The Stirrup Cup Sensation (1924)
- Father Voss (1925)
- The Silver Treasure (1926)
- Thou Fool (1926)
- Nameless Woman (1927)
- Intoxicated Love (1927)
- The Island of Forbidden Kisses (1927)
- The Hunt for the Bride (1927)
- The Passing of Mr. Quinn (1928)
- The Man Who Changed His Name (1928)
- The Crimson Circle (1929)
- Devotion (1929)
- The Last Hour (1930)
- The Price of Things (1930)
- Kissing Cup's Race (1930)
- Other People's Sins (1931)
- The Great Gay Road (1931)
- Rynox (1932)
- Reunion (1932)
- The Marriage Bond (1932)
- Song of the Plough (1933)
- Designing Women (1934)
- The Girl in the Flat (1934)
- Lest We Forget (1934)
- Important People (1934)
- Temptation (1934)
- Debt of Honour (1936)
- Men of Yesterday (1936)
- Wings of the Morning (1937)
- Dinner at the Ritz (1937)
- The Squeaker (1937)
- The Dance of Death (1938)
- Confidential Lady (1940)
- Shadowed Eyes (1940)
- Banana Ridge (1942)
- One of Our Aircraft Is Missing (1942)
- Salute John Citizen (1942)
- The New Lot (1943)
- The World Owes Me a Living (1945)
- The Root of All Evil (1947)
- Jassy (1947)
- The White Unicorn (1947)
- My Sister and I (1948)
- Woman Hater (1948)
- Let's Have a Murder (1950)
