= Frank Wilson (director) =

British actor, writer and director (born 1873)

- Born: 3 March 1873; Norfolk, England; United Kingdom
- Died: 31 October 1952 (aged 79)
- Occupations: Film director, actor, screenwriter
- Years active: 1907–1926 (film)

Frank Wilson (3 March 1873 – 31 October 1952), was a British actor, writer and film director. Wilson was a prolific director during the silent era, shooting well over 200 shorts and feature films. He worked at the pioneering Hepworth Pictures in Walton Studios and later at Broadwest of Walthamstow Studios.

== Selected filmography ==
=== Director ===
- The Jewel Thieves Outwitted (1913)
- The Vicar of Wakefield (1913)
- A Cigarette-Maker's Romance (1913)
- The Heart of Midlothian (1914)
- Justice (1914)
- Her Boy (1915)
- The Nightbirds of London (1915)
- The White Boys (1916)
- The Grand Babylon Hotel (1916)
- A Bunch of Violets (1916)
- A Gamble for Love (1917)
- The Man Behind 'The Times' (1917)
- Her Marriage Lines (1917)
- A Grain of Sand (1917)
- The Woman Wins (1918)
- The Soul of Guilda Lois (1919)
- The Irresistible Flapper (1919)
- With All Her Heart (1920)

== Bibliography ==
- Low, Rachael. The History of the British Film 1918–1929. George Allen & Unwin, 1971.
