= Nat Gould =

British novelist (1857–1919)

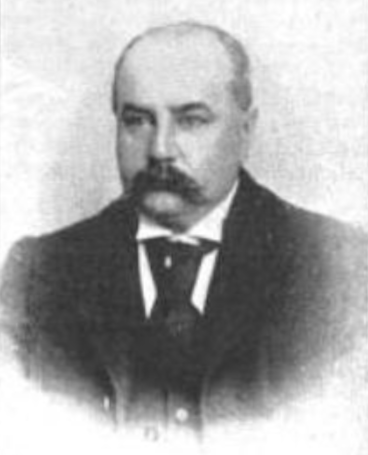
- In The Sketch, 13 November 1895
- Born: Nathaniel Gould; 21 December 1857; Manchester, England
- Died: 25 July 1919 (aged 61); Bedfont, England
- Occupation: Writer
- Spouse: Elizabeth Madelaine Ruska (m. 1886)
- Children: 7

Nathaniel Gould (21 December 1857 – 25 July 1919) was a British novelist. He was a best-selling author in his lifetime.

== Life ==
Gould was born at Manchester, Lancashire on 21 December 1857, the only surviving child of Nathaniel Gould, a tea merchant, and his wife Mary, née Wright. Both parents came from Derbyshire yeomen families.

In April 1886 in Brisbane, he married Miss Elizabeth Madelaine Ruska, and there were seven children of the marriage.

Nat Gould was buried at Bradbourne in Derbyshire on 29 July 1919, and his grave is marked by a stone cross near the churchyard gates.

== Works ==
Gould was a successful and prolific author of stories about horse racing, that were "technically flawless on racing matters".

Graham Lord has pointed out similarities of titles between Gould and Dick Francis. (A Dead Certainty/Dead Cert, Banker and Broker/Banker and Odds On/Odds Against), as well as similarities of plot – such as between Warned Off (1901) and Enquiry (1969), in which an honest jockey has to clear his name after another jockey has given biased evidence against him. But as Lord points out, Gould "churned out nearly five novels a year – some full length, 300 page hardbacks, others little ninety-six page 'yellowback' paperbacks – and the standard of their writing was not nearly as high as that of Dick Francis books".
