= His House in Order =

His House in Order may refer to:

- His House in Order (play), an Arthur Wing Pinero play
- His House in Order (1920 film), a 1920 Hugh Ford film
- His House in Order (1928 film), a 1928 Randle Ayrton film
