= Dawson Milward =

English stage and film actor, 1865-1926

- Dawson Milward in 1898
- Born: Arthur Dawson Milward; 13 July 1865; Woolwich, England, UK.
- Died: 15 May 1926 (aged 60); The Boltons, England, UK
- Other name: A. Dawson Milward
- Occupations: Actor, playwright
- Years active: 1894 - 1926

Dawson Milward (13 July 1865 – 15 May 1926) was an English actor and playwright, who was sometimes miscredited as "Millward". He began acting as a stage professional in 1894, after several years in amateur productions. He was featured in the original cast for Major Barbara at its premiere in November 1905, and played a supporting role in the year-long run of His House in Order during 1906–1907. He was also in the original cast for The Great Adventure, for which he took part in at least 529 performances during 1913–1914. His first film role came in 1915, and he was still performing on stage in the original production for The Last of Mrs. Cheyney until a month before his sudden death. A tall actor, he was often cast as a senior military officer or titled personage. He wrote at least six one-act plays which were produced on stage, with three also broadcast on early radio.

== Early years ==

He was born Arthur Dawson Milward in Woolwich, on 13 July 1865, to then Major Thomas Walter Milward and Olivia Maria Milward. His father was a Royal Artillery veteran of the Crimean War, the Second Opium War, and the British expedition to Abyssinia. He was promoted to Colonel, awarded a C.B., and was an aide-de-camp to Queen Victoria. His mother was a daughter of David Beatty, Esq., of Raheenduff in County Wexford.

Milward was the sixth of seven children born to the couple. He was baptized at St Mary Magdalene Woolwich on 18 August 1865. His father, then superintendent of the Royal Laboratory at the Royal Arsenal, died at age 49 of respiratory failure on 31 December 1874. At age 15, Milward was attending school while living with his widowed mother, four siblings and two servants in Plumstead. He was still living at home at age 25, while working as a manager for a wine merchant, but had dropped his first name.

== Early stage career ==
=== Amateur beginnings ===
Milward first started acting as an amateur. His earliest known credit comes with the Hyde Park Dramatic Club at Ladbroke Hall during March 1889, as Conrad von Rosenberg in Court Cards by John Palgrave Simpson. He used the billing "A. Dawson Milward" for this performance. A reviewer who wrote about a different performance a month later said Milward was "one of the tallest young men that the stage can have seen since Sir William Don". By January 1893, he was a member of the Henry Irving Amateur Dramatic Club, performing as Posthumus Leonatus in Cymbeline to favorable reviews. Later that year, still with the Irving Club, he starred in a one-act play and directed a second upon the same bill, both to creditable review.

=== Professional start ===
Having dropped his first initial, Dawson Milward made his professional debut with a one-act play, Such Is Love by Alfred M. Mond, on 5 July 1894, at the Avenue Theatre. He then joined one of H. Beerbohm Tree's touring companies, performing in A Bunch of Violets for provincial audiences starting August 1894. The following April Milward was with the Ben Greet touring company, performing as Theseus in A Midsummer Night's Dream, for which a local reviewer wrote "Mr. Dawson Milward makes a stately Duke of Athens". He also performed as Polixenes in The Winter's Tale, with Henry B. Irving as Leontes.

From August 1895 through June 1896, Milward was the male lead for a revival of The Second Mrs. Tanqueray, with the Fred G. Latham touring company. Under the Red Robe was adapted by Edward Rose for the stage from the 1894 novel. Milward had a featured role as Sir Thomas Brunt for the original production at the Haymarket Theatre starting 17 October 1896. He continued in this part until 2 June 1897, when the production closed after seven months.

After a brief revival of Caste, where he played Captain Hawtree for the first time, Milward took another leading man role in The White Heather. This original Drury Lane melodrama ran from September through December 1897, with a return engagement in the late spring of 1898. The following September he again figured in another original Drury Lane melodrama, The Great Ruby, which ran through December 1898.

=== Established name ===
My Lady Virtue (1902)

Milward's arrival as an established name in the theatre was signaled by it being used in advertisements for benefits. One of the first such instances was raising funds for the Gordon Memorial College at the Royalty Theatre in December 1898. Another was a charity concert for the British Ophthalmic Hospital in May 1899, for which he and Sybil Carlisle performed A Matter of Duty.

His commercial work continued with a June 1899 revival of One of the Best by Seymour Hicks and George Edwardes, an 1895 melodrama based on the Dreyfus affair. He then joined the cast of the long-running The Gay Lord Quex as a replacement in August 1899. He continued in this production through February 1900, when he took over the title role while John Hare vacationed. Milward received some rare criticism when he replaced Ben Webster in Kate Rorke's revival of A. W. Pinero's The Squire during late April 1900. Despite having successful runs in Drury Lane melodramas, a reviewer for The Morning Post claimed Milward was "Essentially a light comedy actor", who was "lacking in virility" in the more robust melodrama of The Squire's later acts.

Milward finished 1900 with an original historical drama Colonel Cromwell, and opened 1901 with two revival comedies, A Fool's Paradise, and Wheels Within Wheels. The Undercurrent, an original four-act comedy by R. C. Carton with Milward as a marquess, ran from September through December 1901. The following year he played opposite Eva Moore in My Lady Virtue, a four-act original comedy by Moore's husband, H. V. Esmond.

== Stage and screen ==
=== Major Barbara and His House in Order ===
Major Barbara

A small role in Whitewashing Julia and a revival of Caste led in to a 1903 provincial tour supporting Mrs. Patrick Campbell as her leading man in two revivals. Some short-lived original productions followed until October 1905, when he performed in Lights Out, an American adaptation of a German play that was titled Taps on Broadway. A military legal drama in which Milward had a feature role as the friend of the play's dubious hero, Milward stayed with it for two months. During this time, Milward created the role of Charles Lomax, the empty-headed fiancé prone to outbursts of laughter who is the target of Lady Britomart's acid tongue, for the premiere of George Bernard Shaw's Major Barbara. It debuted as a matinee on 28 November 1905; Milward went on to play in Lights Out that evening, and for all of December. Major Barbara, with Milward's participation, played several matinees that month. When it began a daily run on 1 January 1906, Milward left Lights Out. Major Barbara closed its first regular run on 27 January 1906, though it continued to be presented occasionally at matinees.

His House in Order

Milward signed for a new dramatic comedy by A. W. Pinero, titled His House in Order, which premiered on 1 February 1906. The play was produced by and starred George Alexander. Milward played an officer who years before had secretly betrayed a friend by fathering a son with his late wife. When the secret comes out, he is barred from the house where his young son now lives. Milward drew praise from a reviewer for his performance as "the wretched Major [who] has to part from the son whom he cannot claim". The production proved very popular, running at the St. James's Theatre until 27 February 1907, for 427 performances. Milward then went into another American import, The Truth by Clyde Fitch, in which he tried to come between Marie Tempest and Allan Aynesworth. This ran from April through October 1907, upon which the same three principal actors took up The Barrier by Alfred Sutro for a much shorter run. (Note: Milward was the only participant to escape the condemnation of The Times reviewer, "in one of those deliberate negations of real life which Mr. Sutro constructs under the curiously chosen title of plays".)

His Borrowed Plumes

Milward starred in a touring revival of Shaw's Candida during Spring 1908; he finished the year with another work by Alfred Sutro, The Builder of Bridges. This ran from November 1908 through February 1909. He then became involved with the premiere of His Borrowed Plumes, written by a Mrs. George Cornwallis-West, who at that time was Lady Randolph Churchill. The play was produced by and starred Mrs. Patrick Campbell, who five years later would herself become Mrs. George Cornwallis-West. Milward had the title role, a playwright husband who unwittingly borrows his novelist wife's (Mrs. Patrick Campbell) latest plot. Despite the cachet of a command performance for King Edward VII and Queen Alexandra on 9 July 1909, the play's run was limited, ending the same month it began. Milward finished the season playing Edmund in King Lear for a month, and then a pompous general in a new comedy called Don by Rudolf Besier, which ran, with a change of venue, from October 1909 through April 1910.

Preserving Mr. Panmure

Milward's next significant role was in Mrs. Skeffington by Cosmo Hamilton. A slight comedy in three acts, Milward played the male lead, a bachelor Major Skeffington who must suddenly produce a Mrs. Skeffington to protect the honor of his Colonel's wife. Fortunately, a brother officer (Frederick Worlock) has a sister that the Colonel has never met, a character played by the playwright's wife, Beryl Faber. During January 1911, he was cast in the premiere of a new play by A. W. Pinero, Preserving Mr. Panmure. A comedy about a kiss stolen from a young governess (Marie Lohr), with the married guilty party (Arthur Playfair) ironically tasked to investigate the bachelor innocents (Milward and Dion Boucicault), it ran for three months. He performed as Major Saranoff in a May 1911 revival of Arms and the Man that was directed by George Bernard Shaw. The Colonel and the Lady, a one-act farce by Milward and F. Holman Clark, was first produced during November 1911, as an opener for the run of a full-length comedy. (Note: Milward did not perform in this initial production of his play, which featured Spencer Trevor and Vera Coburn.)

=== The Great Adventure and film debut ===
Mumsée

Doormats, by Hubert Henry Davies, in which Milward played the other man in a romantic triangle, ran from October 1912 through March 1913. Milward's character was more complex than his usual roles, displaying an unexpected dimension in the final act. From Doormats, Milward went right into another long-running play, The Great Adventure by Arnold Bennett. This four-act comedy, in which Milward played a ducal art patron, had its premiere in March 1913, starring Henry Ainley and Wish Wynne. A year later it celebrated its 414th performance, having picked up ten replacements but with Milward still in the cast. He last appears in advertisements for this production on 4 July 1914, for the 529th performance, but may have stayed on longer. By September, Milward had gone into a brief revival of The Little Minister by J. M. Barrie, then finished the year in an original cast revival of His House in Order.

Milward's first screen appearance occurred in November 1915, with an obscure four-reel silent film titled The Builder of Bridges, adapted from a 1908 play of the same title by Alfred Sutro. A month later, he reprised his stage role of Captain Hawtree in Caste, a four-reel Turner Film starring Sir John Hare. (Note: Produced by Larry Trimble, the film also featured Mary Rorke, Esme Hubbard, Campbell Gullan, Roland Pertwee, and Peggy Hyland.) His third film, Altar Chains, was in general release by August 1917.

He continued stage work in May 1916 with a new comedy called Pen, adapted by Horace Annesley Vachell from a 1905 novel Lady Penelope by Morley Roberts. He had a far better role in Billeted which ran for 240 performances during 1917–1918. Another comedy, Nurse Benson, had him declining to pursue the title character, while Mumsée in 1920 had him back in uniform and confessing an old love.

=== Final performances ===
The Outsider

Towards the end of April 1923, Milward took a leading part in The Outsider by Dorothy Brandon. This had a trial in Folkestone before a West End premiere in May. The story concerned a questionable inventor (played by Leslie Faber) who has developed a machine for treating cripples that is resisted by the medical establishment. The most eminent surgeon (Milward) has a crippled daughter (Isobel Elsom) who champions the outsider. (The author herself used two canes for walking). J. T. Grein, who witnessed the opening night, said it had a "rapturous reception", accorded to cast and play alike.

His final performance was for The Last of Mrs. Cheyney, which premiered in September 1925. Milward supported Gladys Cooper in the title role, and Gerald du Maurier, who also produced. During this long stage engagement he also completed work on his last film, One Colombo Night, which was panned by reviewers when exhibited at a trade show in February 1926.

== Death ==

Milward took six weeks leave from the production of Mrs. Cheney, his role as Lord Elton being taken by Henry Wolston, after 19 April 1926. (Note: This was the last date on which his name appeared in newspaper advertising for the play. The next day it was dropped.) During this leave he served as an usher at the funeral of Squire Bancroft on 23 April 1926.

He died on 15 May 1926, after a short illness at his home in The Boltons. Some obituaries gave his age as 55, but The Daily Telegraph had it correct as 60. His will, probated the following month, left his modest estate of £2600 to his younger brother, Harry Dacres Milward, a retired British Army officer, with a bequest of £200 and his Austin motor-car to his chauffeur.

== Personal character ==
Nurse Benson

Milward played cricket with a theatrical team in the 1890s, and was successful in amateur golf competitions during later years. He was a member of the Stage Golf Society, and of the Garrick Club, and served as best man at the 1910 wedding of Charles Quartermaine and Madge Titheradge. The 1911 census for England showed him heading a household that included an older sister, a cook, and a housemaid.

J. T. Grein, who knew Milward, said "Outwardly he was always self-possessed, but in reality he was a very shy and nervous artist". Grein said Milward was, despite a long string of stage successes and his popularity among colleagues, never completely confident about his achievements. A brief remembrance in the Liverpool Daily Post said he was a "thoroughly competent" actor who thought it "better to work forty weeks in the year for comparatively modest remuneration than for six weeks or so at the dazzling salary" of a star.

== Plays ==
Milward's first known play, An Unexpected Visit, was produced in 1900. His second, a one-act farce written with F. Holman Clark, was first produced in November 1911. Towards the end of his career, Milward wrote at least five more plays. Most were one-act duologues, performed at benefits and in the provinces between his major engagements. One was a longer work: The Convicting Thread, which Milward performed with Margaret Halstan and others, in London and on tour, during October and November 1923.

The year associated with each is based on first known public mention. Jealousy, Parents and History Repeats Itself were broadcast on radio during July 1924.

- An Unexpected Visit (1900) - A one-act duologue.
- The Colonel and the Lady (1911) One-act farce, co-written with F. Holman Clark, first produced November 1911.
- Jealousy (1920) - A one-act duologue.
- The Convicting Thread (1923) - A long one-act play with multiple characters.
- Parents (1923) - A one-act duologue. First performed with Lilian Braithwaite for a benefit during November 1923.
- History Repeats Itself (1924) - A one-act duologue.

== Selected stage credits ==
Professional appearances only, by year of Milward's first involvement.
Year	Play	Role	Venue	Notes/Sources
1894	Such Is Love	Mr. Greville	Avenue Theatre	Playing a jealous husband, Milward performed with "commendable earnestness".
1894	A Bunch of Violets	Viscount Sorrel	Beerbohm touring company	
1895	A Midsummer Night's Dream	Theseus	Ben Greet company	
1895	The Winter's Tale	Polixenes	Ben Greet company	Performed at Stratford-on-Avon.
1895	The Two Roses	Caleb Deecie	Ben Greet company	Revival of 1870 three-act comedy by James Albery.
1895	The Second Mrs. Tanqueray	Aubrey Tanqueray	Fred G. Latham company	Milward toured in this leading role for nearly ten months.
1896	Under the Red Robe	Sir Thomas Brunt	Haymarket Theatre	Four-act historical drama has Milward as an English duelist in 1630s France.
1897	Caste	Captain Hawtree	Royal Opera House	Milward's first time playing this role came at a provincial theater in Hastings.
1897	The White Heather	Capt. Alec MacLintock	Drury Lane Theatre	Four-act melodrama with Milward as the Scottish protagonist.
1898	The Great Ruby	George Dalrymple	Drury Lane Theatre	Another four-act melodrama by the same team who wrote The White Heather.
1899	One of the Best	Lt. Gen. Coventry	Princess's Theatre	Milward played the commander of Portsmouth military installations in this five-act thriller.
1899	The Gay Lord Quex	Captain Bastling	Globe Theatre	This comedy had been running since April when Milward joined the cast in August 1899.
1900	The Squire	Eric Thorndyke	Princess of Wales's Theatre	This three-act A. W. Pinero revival had just returned to London from touring when Milward joined.
1900	Colonel Cromwell	Lt. Ralf Dangerfield	Globe Theatre	Four-act original historical drama by Charles Cartwright and Arthur Paterson. (Note: This was based on Arthur Paterson's 1899 historical novel, Cromwell's Own.)
1901	A Fool's Paradise	Lord Normantower	Coronet Theatre	Revival of Sydney Grundy's 1889 comedy about a female toxicologist.
1901	Wheels Within Wheels	Egerton Vartrey	Criterion Theatre	Revival of an 1899 three-act comedy by R. C. Carton starred Dion Boucicault and Arthur Bourchier.
1901	The Undercurrent	Marquess of Leckenby	Criterion Theatre	An original four-act comedy by R. C. Carton starred the author's wife, Katherine Compton.
1902	The Heel of Achilles	Julian Lascelles	Globe Theatre	Four-act and a prologue thriller by Louis N. Parker and Boyle Lawrence.
1902	My Lady Virtue	Sir Geoffrey Ernestone	Garrick Theatre	Milward played husband to Eva Moore, who had the title role.
1903	Whitewashing Julia	Mr. Elkington	Garrick Theatre	Tedious three-act comedy by Henry Arthur Jones vindicates Oscar Wilde. (Note: It is telling that the drama critic for The Times was refused entrance to the theatre on opening night, while the reviewer for The Manchester Courier wrote that it was not one of the playwright's greatest successes, and the cast was "heartily applauded, but there was not a strong desire manifested to see the author".)
1903	Caste	Captain Hawtree	Criterion Theatre	Revival of the 1867 play has Milward supporting Marie Tempest and Benjamin Webster. (Note: Milward was still performing in Whitewashing Julia and appeared in this limited engagement of Caste by permission of producer Arthur Bourchier)
1903	The Man Who Was	"Little Mildred"	His Majesty's Theatre	Adaptation by F. Kinsey Peile of Rudyard Kipling's 1890 short story set in 1876 Peshawar. (Note: The first night was a benefit performance for Guy's Hospital. In attendance were King Edward VII and Queen Alexandra, and the Prince and Princess of Wales, among others.)
1903	The Joy of Living	Volkerlingk	Touring company	Adaptation of Es lebe das Leben! by Hermann Sudermann, produced by and starring Mrs. Patrick Campbell.
1903	The Second Mrs. Tanqueray	Aubrey Tanqueray	Touring company	This revival was given on alternate nights with The Joy of Living.
1904	The Rich Mrs. Repton	(Amateur blackmailer)	Duke of York's Theatre	Three-act comedy by R. C. Carton, "very slight and quite harmless".
1905	Great Friends	Sydney Baldwin, MP	Royal Court Theatre	Three-act comedy by G. S. Street with Milward and Gertrude Kingston as leads.
1905	Agatha	Colonel Ford	His Majesty's Theatre	Three-act comedy by Mrs. Humphrey Ward and Louis N. Parker starred Viola Tree.
1905	Lights Out	Lieutenant von Howen	Waldorf Theatre	American adaptation by Charles Swickard of Zapfenstreich by Franz Adam Bayerlein.
1905	Major Barbara	Charles Lomax	Court Theatre	Prime Minister Arthur Balfour attended the premiere of Shaw's work.
1906	His House in Order	Major Guy Maurewarde	St. James's Theatre	Long running four-act dramatic comedy by A. W. Pinero had Milward in an atypical role of pathos.
1907	The Truth	Frederick Lindon	Comedy Theatre	A supporting role for Milward as a would-be cad.
1907	The Barrier	Marquis of Studland, M.P.	Comedy Theatre	Four-act play by Alfred Sutro
1908	Susannah-- and Some Others	Adrian Thrale	Royalty Theatre	Four-act comedy by Madame Albanesi based on her 1904 novel Susannah and One Elder.
1908	Candida	Rev. James Morrell	Touring company	Revival produced by Annie Horniman with Ellen O'Malley in the title role.
1908	The Thief	Raymond Layton	Touring company	Three-act drama adapted by Cosmo Gordon-Lennox from the 1906 play Le Voleur by Henri Bernstein.
1908	The Builder of Bridges	Arnold Faringay	St. James's Theatre	Four-act sentimental work by Alfred Sutro has Milward as a repentant embezzler.
1909	His Borrowed Plumes	Maj. Percival Sumner VC	Hicks Theatre (Note: This venue was renamed to the Globe Theatre during this week.)	Three-act comedy had both Mrs. Patrick Campbell and her daughter Stella Patrick Campbell in the cast.
1909	King Lear	Edmund	Haymarket Theatre	This production was headed by Norman McKinnel as Lear and Ellen O'Malley as Cordelia.
1909	Don	General Sinclair	Haymarket Theatre	Three-act comedy by Rudolf Besier starred Charles Quartermaine in the title role.
1910	The Man from the Sea	Mark Averill, MD	Queen's Theatre	Four-act comedy by William John Locke starred Robert Loraine and Nina Boucicault.
1910	Mrs. Skeffington	Maj. John Skeffington	Queen's Theatre	Military comedy by Cosmo Hamilton, "charmingly acted by Miss Faber and Mr. Dawson Milward".
1911	Preserving Mr. Panmure	Reginald Stulkeley, MP	Comedy Theatre	Four-act comedy by A. W. Pinero has Milward win Marie Lohr.
1911	Arms and the Man	Major Sergius Saranoff	Criterion Theatre	Revival directed by George Bernard Shaw of his 1893 comedy.
1912	Fanny's First Play	Juggins the Footman	Kingsway Theatre	Milward joined this long-running production as a temporary replacement.
1912	Doormats	Captain Harding	Wyndham's Theatre	Comedy by Hubert Henry Davies ran for twenty-four weeks, through March 1913.
1913	The Great Adventure	Lord Leonard Alcar	Kingsway Theatre	Long-running original play for which Milward was second-billed after the two leads.
1914	The Little Minister	Earl of Rintoul	Duke of York's Theatre	Revival
1915	The Joker	Col. Hildebrand	New Theatre	Spy farce by Ernest Schofield and John Ramsay starred Norman Page in the title role.
1915	The Day Before the Day	Col. Wellingford	St. James's Theatre	Three-act melodrama about German spies in Britain by Chester Bailey Fernald.
1915	The Ware Case	Sir Henry Egerton	Wyndham's Theatre	Four-act melodrama by George Pleydell Bancroft has Milward as a high-ranking CID man.
1916	Pen	Capt. Victor Goby, MFH	St. James's Theatre	Three-act comedy has Milward among a quartet of suitors for Lady Penelope.
1917	Billeted	Col. James Preedy	Royalty Theatre	This three-act comedy ran for 240 performances in the West End.
1918	Nurse Benson	Hon. Brooke Stanway	Globe Theatre	Four-act comedy by R. C. Carton and Justin Huntly McCarthy, produced by Marie Lohr.
1918	A Well-Remembered Voice	Major Armitage	Wyndham's Theatre	One-act play by James Barrie, given several times for Lady Lytton's Hospital.
1920	Mumsée	Colonel Armytage	Little Theatre	Eva Moore and Milward were the leads of this drama by Edward Knoblock.
1920	Other Times	Mr. Lorimer	Little Theatre	This three-act comedy by Harold Brighouse directly followed Mumsée.
1920	Jealousy	The Man	London Coliseum	A duologue written by Milward and performed by him and Lilian Braithwaite for a charity benefit.
1920	A Marriage of Convenience	The General	Globe Theatre	A revival of this 1897 Sydney Grundy adaptation of Un Mariage de Louis XV by Alexandre Dumas.
1921	The Eleventh Commandment	Sir Noel Barchester	Touring company Royalty Theatre	Viola Tree and Milward starred in this three-act drama by Brandon Fleming.
1923	The Great Broxopp	Sir Roger Tenterden	St. Martin's Theatre	Comedy by A. A. Milne had Milward as a conniving baronet with Ian Hunter as his son.
1923	The Outsider	Jasper Sturdee, M.S.	Pleasure Gardens Theatre; St. James's Theatre	Milward had a leading part as an eminent surgeon, with Isobel Elsom as his daughter.
1923	The Convicting Thread	Physician	Touring company	A long one-act detective play by Milward that he performed with Margaret Halstan.
1923	How He Lied to Her Husband	Teddy Bompas	Victoria Palace Theatre	Margaret Halstan produced and starred in this revival with Milward and Henry Kendall.
1924	The Flame	Lord Blantyre	Wyndham's Theatre	Four-act drama adapted by J. B. Fagan from a French play by Charles Méré.
1924	Diplomacy	Henry Beauclerc	Adelphi Theatre	
1925	The Last of Mrs. Cheyney	Lord Elton	St James's Theatre	One of Milward's most successful parts was in this original comedy.

== Filmography ==
Film (by year of first release)
Year	Title	Role	Notes
1915	The Builder of Bridges	TBD	Adapted from the 1908 play by Alfred Sutro in which Milward performed.
1916	Caste	Captain Hawtree	Milward reprised his earlier stage performances for this Turner Film production.
1917	Altar Chains	TBD	Made by the London Film Company, with Edward O'Neill and Heather Thatcher.
1920	General Post	Denys Broughton	
1921	The Magistrate	Colonel Lukyn	
1921	The Skin Game	Mr. Hillcrist	
1922	The Recoil	Anthony Orpington	
1924	The Eleventh Commandment	Sir Noel Barchester	Milward reprised his role from the 1922 stage play.
1925	King of the Castle		
1926	One Colombo Night	Governor	He was credited in a newspaper as "Millward" for this silent film.
