= His House in Order (play) =

1906 play by Arthur Wing Pinero

- Irene Vanbrugh, Iris Hawkins, and George Alexander
- Original language: English
- Written by: Arthur Wing Pinero
- First publication: 1906
- Subject: Second marriage conflict
- Genre: Comedy
- Setting: Overbury Towers, a midlands country house

Premiere
- Date: February 1, 1906 (UK); September 3, 1906 (US)
- Place: St. James's Theatre (UK); Empire Theatre (US)
- Directed by: Ralph H. Kimpton (UK); Dion Boucicault (US)
- Original run: 427 performances (UK); 127 performances (US)

His House in Order is a 1906 English play by Arthur Wing Pinero. Though the author called it a comedy, it was regarded by reviewers as a drama. It had four acts and three settings, with thirteen characters. The action of the play takes place over little more than one day. The story concerns a English MP, whose second wife draws unfavorable comparison with his deceased first, until the latter's secret infidelity is revealed. The title is derived from two similar Biblical verses, 2 Kings 20:1 and Isaiah 38:1.

The play was first produced by George Alexander and staged by Ralph H. Kimpton, with sets by Percy Macquoid and Joseph Harker. His House in Order starred Alexander, with Irene Vanbrugh. It had a West End premiere in early February 1906 and ran through February 1907 for 427 performances.

Charles Frohman produced the play on Broadway, starting in September 1906, with staging by Dion Boucicault. It starred John Drew, with Margaret Illington, and ran through December for 127 performances.

His House in Order was adapted for a 1920 American silent film and a 1928 British silent film, both now lost.

== Characters ==
Characters are listed in order of appearance within their scope.

Lead

- Hillary Jesson is 46, a genial diplomat just returned from overseas.
- Nina Graham Jesson is 26, a poor housekeeper but a true spouse to Filmer.

Supporting

- Filmer Jesson, MP is 40, a promising politician but a humorless fellow of settled habits.
- Geraldine Ridgeley is 37, Filmer's sister-in-law and housekeeper, who constantly thwarts Nina.

Featured

- Forshaw is an assertive reporter for a local midlands newspaper.
- Harding is Filmer's secretary, discreet and capable.
- Derek Jesson is 8, the product of Filmer's first marriage; a bit cheeky, fond of Maurewarde.
- Mlle. Berthe Thomé is 30, the French governess to Derek, accomplished and quietly vivacious.
- Lady Ridgeley is Filmer's mother-in-law; bigoted, uncultured, easily offended.
- Maj. Guy Maurewarde, DSO is 43, the Jesson brothers' longtime friend.
- Sir Daniel Ridgeley is Filmer's father-in-law; a rude, pompous colliery owner.
- Pryce Ridgeley is 34, Geraldine's brother; supercilious, shallow, and presumptuous.
- Dr. Dilnott is the mayor of the local town, a bustling cheery booster who irks the Ridgeleys.

Bit players and off stage

- Blyth and Wilmot are male servants
- Annabel Ridgeley Jesson was Filmer's first wife, mother of Derek, younger sister to Geraldine and Pryce.

== Synopsis ==
All scenes take place at Overbury Towers, the midlands country home of Filmer Jesson, during the parliamentary recess for Easter. The characters have gathered for a ceremony to open a new park in memory of the late Annabel Jesson, who died in a carriage accident three years earlier.

Act I (Library, on a bright spring morning.) Harding gives Forshaw a tour of the house, introducing him to Filmer Jesson. Filmer has brought his brother Hillary from the train station. Hillary has come home from overseas for the memorial ceremony, and to meet his new sister-in-law Nina. Geraldine asks Filmer to release his late wife's boudoir for use as a schoolroom for Derek, knowing that Filmer had denied it to Nina. Geraldine summons Derek to meet his uncle Hillary, who also greets Mlle. Thomé in French. Derek tells Hillary that "Maurry" (Maj. Maurewarde) is his chum as is Mlle. Thomé, but that Nina left him befuddled. Filmer explains that Nina was hired as Derek's governess, but proved inept. After Filmer married Nina, he sent for Geraldine to be housekeeper, as Nina could not manage to his satisfaction. He extolled Annabel's capability to Hillary, who perceives Derek has picked up Geraldine's contempt for Nina. Alone with Hillary, Nina confesses her desperation at being persecuted in her own home by the Ridgeleys. (Curtain)

Act II (Drawing room, after dinner that same day.) The women and Derek await the men who are smoking in the dining room. Lady Ridgely has Geraldine stop Mlle. Thomé from playing Chopin on the piano, as she dislikes "music of that class". Lady Ridgely tries to send Derek to bed, but he wants to wait for Maurry. The men come in and Derek chides Maurry for the delay. Sir Daniel complains about the next days memorial ceremony becoming a festive occasion. He compliments Geraldine on being a fine hostess, irritating Nina. Derek compounds her discomfort by saying good night to everyone but her. Hillary suggests Nina conciliate the Ridgeleys, but she is bitter about Filmer's dependence on Geraldine for the stability he craves in his home. The Ridgeleys reject Nina's overtures, who is at last driven to anger when she learns about Derek inheriting the boudoir for a schoolroom. She accuses Geraldine of frustrating her long-standing request to Filmer; when he equivocates, she refuses to attend the ceremony. (Curtain)

Act III (Inner hall. The next morning.) The Ridgeleys, dressed in mourning for the ceremony to honor Annabel's memory at the new park, await Filmer. He reassures them Nina will attend, but she outrages everyone by wearing a bright pink dress. Left alone to reconsider, Nina is joined by Derek, who has found a bag hidden in his mother's room. Nina opens it and removes four letters without Derek seeing. As Hillary learns when Nina shows him the letters, they indicate a long-standing affair between Maurewarde and Annabel. More, it is plain that Derek is their child, and not Filmer's son. Nina wants to use the letters as a secret cudgel against Geraldine and the Ridgeleys, threatening the memory of their perfect Annabel. Hillary dissuades her and takes the letters. Purged of her bile, Nina lapses into a dejected submissiveness. (Curtain)

Act IV (Same as Act III. A couple of hours later.) The party has returned from the ceremony in the park. Hillary confronts Maurewarde with the letters, telling him to go and never return. Maurewarde accepts his exile, confessing he alone knew Annabel's true ardent nature. Derek, unaware of the letters content, gently chides Maurewarde for not meeting him earlier. Hillary tells Derek that his chum is leaving, but he may have a few minutes more with him. Nina has surrendered to the Ridgeleys, humbling herself and agreeing with their wishes. With Nina subdued, Geraldine, sensing triumph, sets Pryce to chastise Hillary for making trouble. But Pryce is browbeaten by Hillary for his churlish opinions of Nina and presumption to have any say in Filmer's house. With Maurewarde gone, Hillary informs Filmer about the letters. Filmer in turn informs the Ridgeleys that going forward Nina will be mistress of his house, implicitly discharging Geraldine. Defeated, they withdraw, while Nina scolds Hillary for having shown the letters to Filmer. She burns them in the fireplace then goes to comfort Filmer, while Hillary quietly departs. (Curtain)

== Original production ==
=== Background ===
A columnist for the Evening Standard reported in early December 1905 that Arthur Wing Pinero had a new comedy, His House in Order, for the St. James's Theatre, and that "he has set his story among a middle-class family on the outskirts of a provincial town". (Note: Middle-class in the columnist's reckoning was social rather than economic, i.e. there were no titled figures involved.) Another columnist judged that producer George Alexander and playwright Pinero were wise to schedule their opening for February 1906, for an upcoming "General Election is not likely to make January a very profitable month in West End theatres".

George Alexander selected Ralph H. Kimpton to be stage manager for the new production, with rehearsals set to start in January 1906. The sets were designed by Percy Macquoid and painted by Joseph Harker. By early January, the Evening Standard reported the complete cast list and opening date, along with a summary of the setting.

=== Cast ===
Cast for the original West End production.
Role	Actor	Dates	Notes and sources
Hillary Jesson	George Alexander	Feb 01, 1906 - Feb 27, 1907	
Nina Jesson	Irene Vanbrugh	Feb 01, 1906 - Feb 27, 1907	Newspaper advertising said Irene Vanbrugh appeared courtesy of Charles Frohman.
Filmer Jesson	Herbert Waring	Feb 01, 1906 - Feb 27, 1907	
Geraldine Ridgeley	Beryl Faber	Feb 01, 1906 - Feb 27, 1907	Married to playwright Cosmo Hamilton, she was the sister of actor C. Aubrey Smith.
Forshaw	E. Vivian Reynolds	Feb 01, 1906 - Feb 27, 1907	
Harding	Robert Horton	Feb 01, 1906 - Feb 27, 1907	
Derek Jesson	Iris Hawkins	Feb 01, 1906 - Feb 27, 1907	The year before, at age 12, she had made a sensation playing a five-year-old boy in Everybody's Secret. (Note: A discovery of Arthur Bourchier, she had performed on stage for two years before joining this production. When the play proved successful, George Alexander engaged another juvenile, Ethel Burne, as her understudy.)
Mlle. Thomé	Marcelle Chevalier	Feb 01, 1906 - Feb 27, 1907	
Lady Ridgeley	Bella Pateman	Feb 01, 1906 - Feb 27, 1907	
Maj. Maurewarde	Dawson Milward	Feb 01, 1906 - Feb 27, 1907	
Sir Daniel Ridgeley	E. Lyall Swete	Feb 01, 1906 - Feb 27, 1907	
Pryce Ridgeley	C. M. Lowne	Feb 01, 1906 - Feb 27, 1907	
Dr. Dilnott	Nigel Playfair	Feb 01, 1906 - Feb 27, 1907	

=== West End premiere and reception ===
Final rehearsal

His House in Order had its West End premiere on February 1, 1906, at St. James's Theatre. The reviewer for The Times said that as Euripides was the most tragic and Molière the most comic of playwrights, so Arthur Wing Pinero was the most dramatic of dramatists, and that His House in Order was Pinero at his best. They did suggest that an alternate title of The Second Mrs. Jesson suited this work more than it did The Second Mrs. Tanqueray. The Times reviewer extolled the acting of George Alexander, who they felt performed far better than Irene Vanbrugh as Nina, and they complimented Dawson Milward, Nigel Playfair, and Iris Hawkins for their work.

The London correspondent for The Birmingham Post judged His House in Order among the three best of Pinero's plays, equal to The Gay Lord Quex with both ranking just behind The Second Mrs. Tanqueray. They had praise for all the performers, and said the audience roared for Mr. Pinero at the final curtain, saluting him with sustained enthusiasm. By June 1906, the play was reported as the success of the London season, outdoing all other non-musical productions, and leading George Alexander to raise prices in the gallery.

The production closed at St. James's Theatre on February 27, 1907, after 427 performances.

== Broadway production ==
Columnist Roy Crandall reported in May 1906 that Charles Frohman had secured the North American rights to His House in Order, and would present it during the coming season with John Drew as the star. The New York Times added that playwright Arthur W. Pinero had himself selected Margaret Illington to play the lead, a break for producer Frohman since she was then his sister-in-law.

His House in Order premiered on Broadway at the Empire Theatre, on September 3, 1906. The production starred John Drew as Hillary, with Margaret Illington as Nina, C. M. Hallard as Filmer, Leona Powers as Derek, and Madge Girdlestone as Geraldine Ridgeley. Henry Vibart played Major Maurewarde, with Lena Halliday as Lady Ridgeley, Arthur Elliot as Sir Daniel, and Martin Sabine as Pryce Ridgeley.

Dion Boucicault staged the play, for which he was thanked by John Drew in a speech after the first night performance. The reviewer for The Sun said that John Drew had performed well, exceeding George Alexander according to those who had seen the original production in London. However, the reviewer ascribed a fault in the playwright's depiction of the Ridgeleys, who were little better than caricatures, and suggested the supporting company, with the exception of Leona Price, were inclined to exaggerate those caricatures.

The production closed at the Empire Theatre on Saturday, December 22, 1906,, going immediately on tour starting with the Montauk Theatre in Brooklyn.

== Adaptations ==
=== Film ===
- His House in Order (1920)
- His House in Order (1928)

== Bibliography ==
- Arthur W. Pinero. His House in Order: A Comedy in Four Acts. William Heinemann. London, 1906.
