= Macquoid =

Macquoid is a surname. Notable people with the surname include:

- Josh McQuoid (born 1989), British semi-professional footballer
- Katharine Sarah Macquoid (1824–1917), British novelist and travel writer
- Percy Macquoid (1852–1925), British theatrical designer and historian
