= King of the Castle =

King of the Castle may refer to:

- King of the Castle (TV series), a British children's television serial
- King of the Castle (1926 film), a British silent drama film
- King of the Castle (1936 film), a British comedy film
- King of the castle (game), a children's game, also known as king of the hill
- "King of the Castle", a song by Alma from her 2020 album Have U Seen Her?
