= Bonds of Love =

1919 film by Reginald Barker

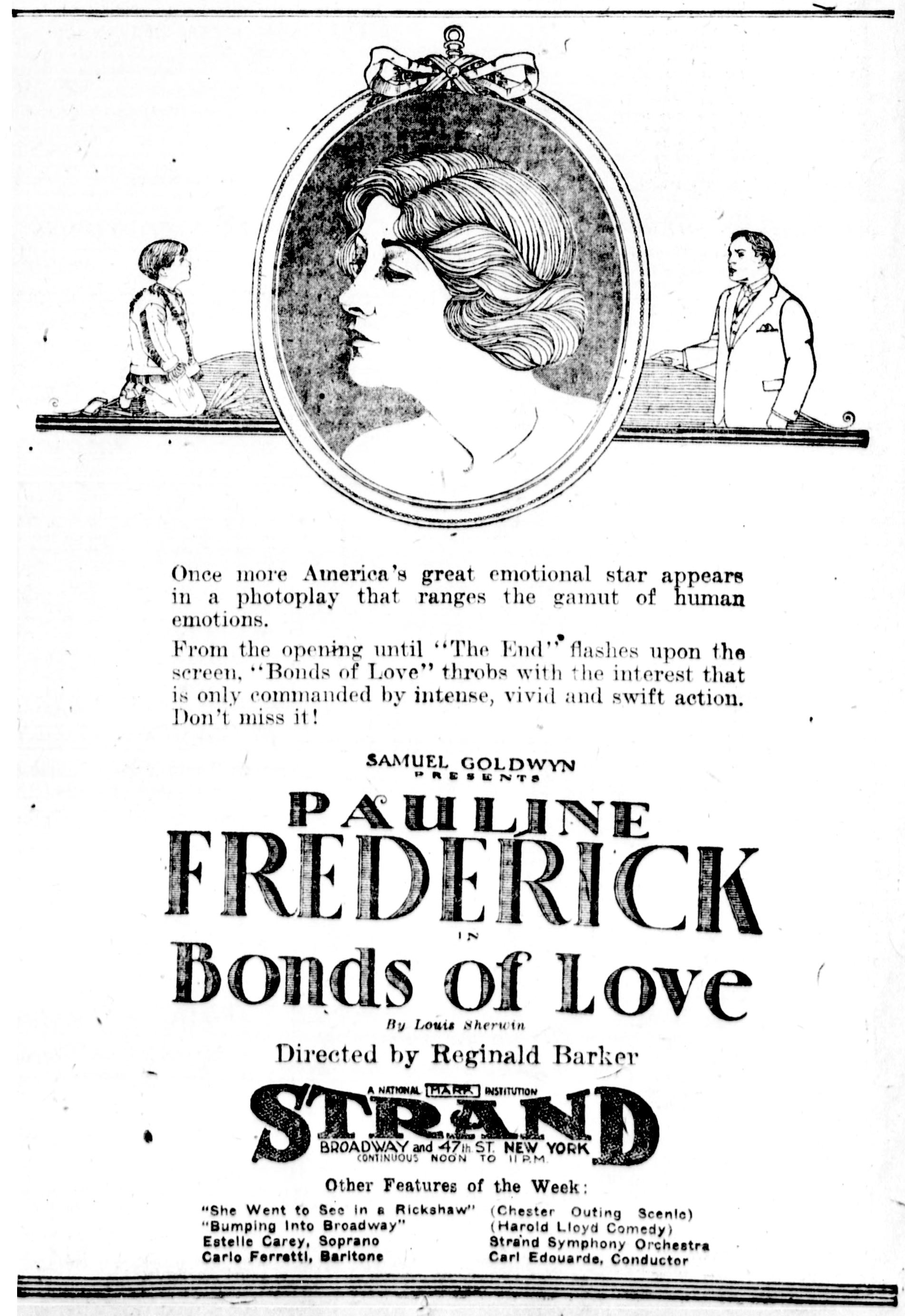
- Newspaper advertisement
- Directed by: Reginald Barker
- Written by: Louis Sherwin (scenario)
- Based on: His House in Order by Arthur Wing Pinero
- Produced by: Goldwyn Pictures
- Starring: Pauline Frederick
- Cinematography: Edward Gheller
- Distributed by: Goldwyn Pictures
- Release date: November 2, 1919
- Running time: 50 minutes
- Country: United States
- Languages: Silent; English intertitles

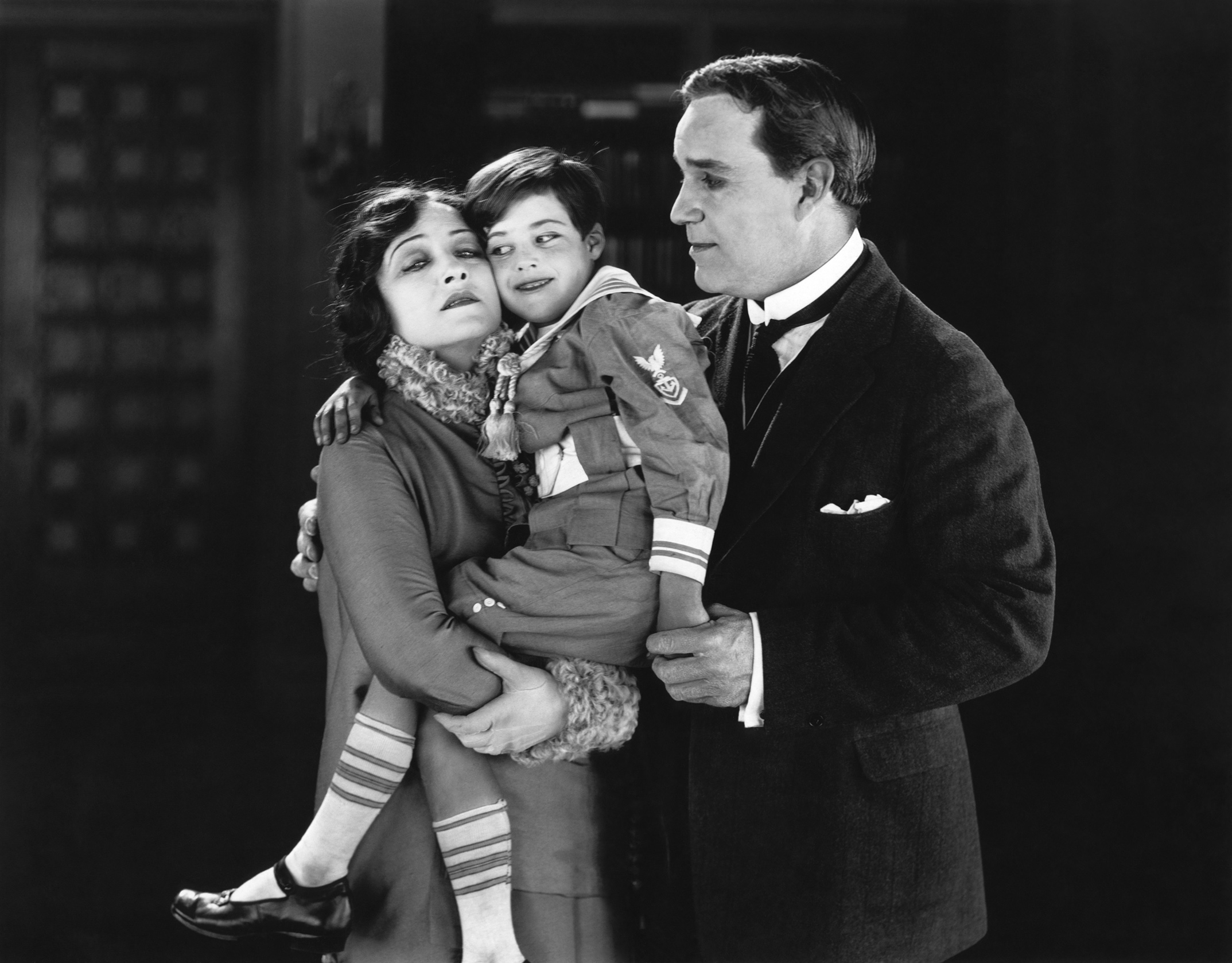
Scene from the film. Pauline Frederick, Frankie Lee and Percy Standing.

Bonds of Love is a 1919 American silent romantic drama film directed by Reginald Barker and starring Pauline Frederick. It is based on the 1906 Arthur Wing Pinero play His House in Order. It was distributed by Goldwyn Pictures. Openings for the film were held at Clune's Theatre in Los Angeles, CA and at the Strand Theatre in New York City.

== Plot ==
Una Sayre, a governess in widower Daniel Cabot's home, saves his son, young Jimmy Cabot, from drowning. Through her attention to the child, she wins the love of her employer despite the plotting of Lucy and Harry Beekman, his late wife's brother and sister. When Una discovers a love letter written by a man whom the first wife was seeing, she visits him and demands that he return all of her letters. Lucy and Harry Beekman use this meeting to cast suspicions on Una's reputation, but Cabot eventually discovers that Una was acting in his own interest. He finally overcomes his devotion to the memory of his dead wife, and throws her greedy relatives out.

== Cast ==
- Pauline Frederick as Una Sayre
- Percy Standing as Daniel Cabot
- Betty Schade as Lucy Beekman
- Leslie Stuart as Harry Beekman
- Charles Clary as Barry Sullivan
- Kate Lester as Mrs. Cunningham
- Frankie Lee as Jimmy Cabot

== Preservation ==
Bonds of Love is currently presumed lost. In February 2021, the film was cited by the National Film Preservation Board on their Lost U.S. Silent Feature Films list.

== See also ==
- His House in Order (1920)
- His House in Order (1928)
- List of lost films
