= His Double Life =

1933 film

- Movie poster
- Directed by: Arthur Hopkins; William C. deMille (associate director)
- Written by: Clara Beranger; Arthur Hopkins
- Based on: the novel Buried Alive and the play The Great Adventure by Arnold Bennett
- Produced by: Eddie Dowling; Arthur Hopkins
- Starring: Roland Young; Lillian Gish; Montagu Love
- Cinematography: Arthur Edeson
- Edited by: Arthur Ellis; A. Pam Blumenthal
- Music by: James F. Hanley; Karl Stark; John Rochetti
- Production company: Eddie Dowling Pictures
- Distributed by: Paramount Pictures
- Release date: December 15, 1933
- Running time: 68 minutes
- Country: United States
- Language: English

His Double Life is a 1933 American pre-Code comedy drama film directed by Broadway theatrical impresario and first time film director Arthur Hopkins with directorial input from the experienced William C. deMille, Cecil's older brother. It stars Roland Young and Lillian Gish.

It had been filmed before in 1921 in the silent era as The Great Adventure with Lionel Barrymore, and was remade again in 1943 as Holy Matrimony with Monty Woolley. The story had also been adapted previously in Britain in 1915 by Laurence Trimble.

It is preserved at the Library of Congress, Washington, D.C., and is available on DVD. This film is now in public domain (in the USA).

== Plot ==
Priam Farrel is England's most renowned painter. A recluse who hates fame, he has been away from England; his longtime agent has never even met him. When Lady Helen mistakenly believes he has proposed to her, he hastily returns to London with his valet Henry Leek. After Leek dies soon after of pneumonia, the attending doctor mistakes him for Priam and informs the press of the renowned painter's demise. The real Priam is glad to be mistaken for his valet by everyone, even his cousin Duncan (who has not seen him since he was 12). After several attempts to clear up the misidentification, he gives up.

He goes to a hotel, where he meets Alice Chalice, who was put in touch with Leek through The Matrimonial Times and, by chance, was to meet Leek for the first time there. Leek had sent her a photograph of him and Priam together, so she makes the same mistake. Priam finds her very pleasant to be with. He has qualms when he learns that "he" is to be accorded the great honor of being interred in Westminster Abbey, but once again he is unable to convince anyone, including Alice, that he is the painter.

He is happy to marry Alice and live a quiet country life. Then Alice's income from brewery shares disappears, along with the brewery, but Priam assures her that he can provide for her by selling some of his paintings. She is skeptical, however. Nonetheless, she sells some of his paintings, mainly for the frames. One painting passes through several hands and ends up with Oxford, Priam's old agent, who recognizes the artist's style. Oxford buys all of Priam's new paintings and resells them, guaranteeing that they are genuine Farrels.

Oxford tracks Priam down and asks him to reveal he is still alive. It turns out that one of the paintings Oxford sold had a date on the back, 1932, two years after Priam's "death", and the buyer has taken Oxford to court. Priam strenuously refuses, so Oxford takes another approach, placing an advertisement asking for information about Henry Leek.

Leek's widow shows up, accompanied by her clergymen sons John and Henry. Her husband deserted her about 25 years before after the birth of their twin sons. She identifies Priam as him. Priam bolts at the first opportunity, but Alice is more than up to the challenge. She portrays her "Henry" as violent and not entirely sane and points out that there would be a scandal. The Leeks hastily depart.

Even so, Priam is brought into court. In the course of testimony, his cousin Duncan recalls that he has two moles on his neck. Priam stubbornly refuses to show them, but Alice convinces him to do so. Afterward, Priam and Alice sail away to recover their privacy.

== Cast ==
- Roland Young as Priam Farrel
- Lillian Gish as Alice Hunter
- Montagu Love as Duncan Farrel
- Lumsden Hare as Oxford
- Lucy Beaumont as Mrs. Leek
- Charles Richman as Witt
- Oliver Smith as Leek Twin – John
- Philip Tonge as Leek Twin – Henry
- Audrey Ridgewell as Lady Helen
- Regina DeValet as Mary
- Charles Halton as Newsman on Phone (uncredited)
- Roland Hogue as Henry Leek (uncredited)

== Reception ==
Mordaunt Hall, critic for The New York Times, described the film as "a highly intelligent type of comedy, one that arouses amusement rather than loud laughter."

== Soundtrack ==
"Someday, Sometime, Somewhere" and "Springtime in Old Granada", written by James F. Hanley and Karl Stark

== See also ==
- Lillian Gish filmography
