= Buried Alive (novel) =

1908 novel by Arnold Bennett

- Author: Arnold Bennett
- Language: English
- Genre: Comedy
- Publication date: 1908
- Publication place: United Kingdom
- Media type: Print

Buried Alive is a 1908 comedy novel by the British writer Arnold Bennett. In 1913 Bennett adapted it as a play The Great Adventure. This later provided the basis for the 1968 musical Darling of the Day.

== Synopsis ==
Priam Farll, a reclusive but celebrated British painter, returns home and to avoid public interest adopts the identity of his recently deceased valet. In turn his servant is given a state funeral. Farll is able to establish a peaceful new life until, needing to raise money, he begins painting again. Soon his works come to the attention of a connoisseur art dealer, threatening his happy new existence.

== Film adaptations ==
The story has been adapted three times by Hollywood, firstly in a 1921 silent film version The Great Adventure starring Lionel Barrymore and Doris Rankin. In 1933 the novel was turned into a sound film His Double Life, directed by Arthur Hopkins and starring Roland Young, Lillian Gish and Montagu Love; it was produced by Paramount Pictures. A second adaptation, Holy Matrimony, was made by Twentieth Century Fox and starred Monty Woolley, Gracie Fields and Laird Cregar.

== Bibliography ==
- Goble, Alan. The Complete Index to Literary Sources in Film. Walter de Gruyter, 1999.
