= The Eleventh Commandment (1924 film) =

1924 film

- Directed by: George A. Cooper
- Based on: The Eleventh Commandment by Brandon Fleming
- Starring: Fay Compton; Stewart Rome; Lillian Hall-Davis
- Cinematography: Basil Emmott
- Production company: Gaumont British Picture Corporation
- Distributed by: Gaumont British Distributors
- Release date: 31 July 1924
- Country: United Kingdom
- Languages: Silent; English intertitles

The Eleventh Commandment is a 1924 British crime film directed by George A. Cooper and starring Fay Compton, Stewart Rome and Lillian Hall-Davis. It is based on the play The Eleventh Commandment by Brandon Fleming.

== Plot ==
An actress tries to rescue her sister from the clutches of a blackmailer.

== Cast ==
- Fay Compton as Ruth Barchester
- Stewart Rome as John Lynton
- Lillian Hall-Davis as Marian Barchester
- Charles Quatermaine as James Mountford
- Jack Hobbs as Robert Ransome
- Dawson Milward as Sir Noel Barchester
- Louise Hampton as Lady Barchester
- Brian Aherne as Norman Barchester
