= One Colombo Night =

1926 film

- Directed by: Henry Edwards
- Written by: Austin Phillips (novel); Alice Ramsey
- Starring: Godfrey Tearle; Marjorie Hume; Nora Swinburne; James Carew
- Production company: Stoll Pictures
- Distributed by: Stoll Pictures
- Release date: 15 November 1926
- Country: United Kingdom
- Languages: Silent; English intertitles

One Colombo Night is a 1926 British silent drama film directed by Henry Edwards and starring Godfrey Tearle, Marjorie Hume and Nora Swinburne. The film was based on a story by Austin Phillips.

== Premise ==
After being ruined in business, a man goes to Australia to make his fortune.

== Cast ==
- Godfrey Tearle as Jim Farnell
- Marjorie Hume as Rosemary Thurman
- Nora Swinburne as Jean Caldicott
- James Carew as Richard Baker
- J. Fisher White as Father Anthony
- William Pardue as Pabu
- Julie Suedo as Lalla
- Dawson Milward as Governor
- Annie Esmond as Wife
