= Smith (play) =

Comedy by the British writer W. Somerset Maugham

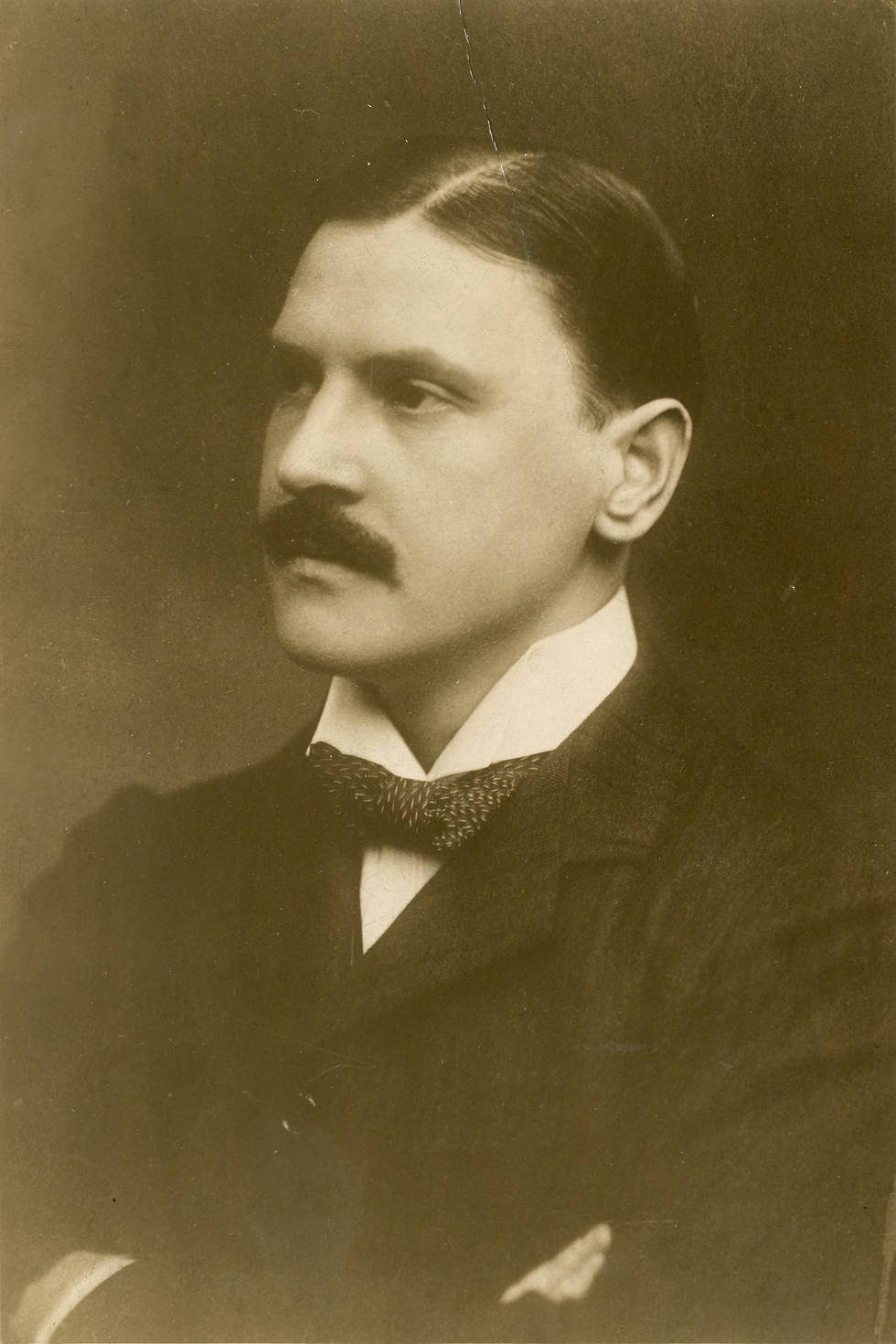
Maugham in 1911

Smith is a comedy by the British writer W. Somerset Maugham, written when he was becoming a successful dramatist. The play was first seen in London in 1909.

In the play, Thomas Freeman returns after years abroad to his sister Rose, and gets to know the fashionable social set who meet at her home; he eventually finds that the parlourmaid has the most merit of any in the household.

== History ==
After the success of Lady Frederick, his plays Mrs Dot and Jack Straw were soon staged. Maugham wrote: "Their success made the managers eager to take other plays... "; three subsequent plays "were written on commission to suit certain actors, Penelope for Marie Tempest, Smith for Miss Marie Lohr and Robert Loraine and The Land of Promise for Irene Vanbrugh.... They established me as the most popular dramatist of the day".

The play was first produced in London at the Comedy Theatre on 30 September 1909. In New York the play was first seen on 5 September 1910 at the Empire Theatre, running until December 1910.

== Original cast ==
Principal members of the cast in 1909 at the Comedy Theatre:

- Thomas Freeman – Robert Loraine
- Algernon Peppercorn – A. E. Matthews
- Mrs Dallas-Baker (Rose) – Kate Cutler
- Emily Chapman – Edyth Latimer
- Mrs Otto Rosenberg (Cynthia) – Lydia Bilbrook
- Smith – Marie Lohr
- Fletcher – Percy Goodyer
- H. D. Baker KC – Frederick Volpe

== Summary ==
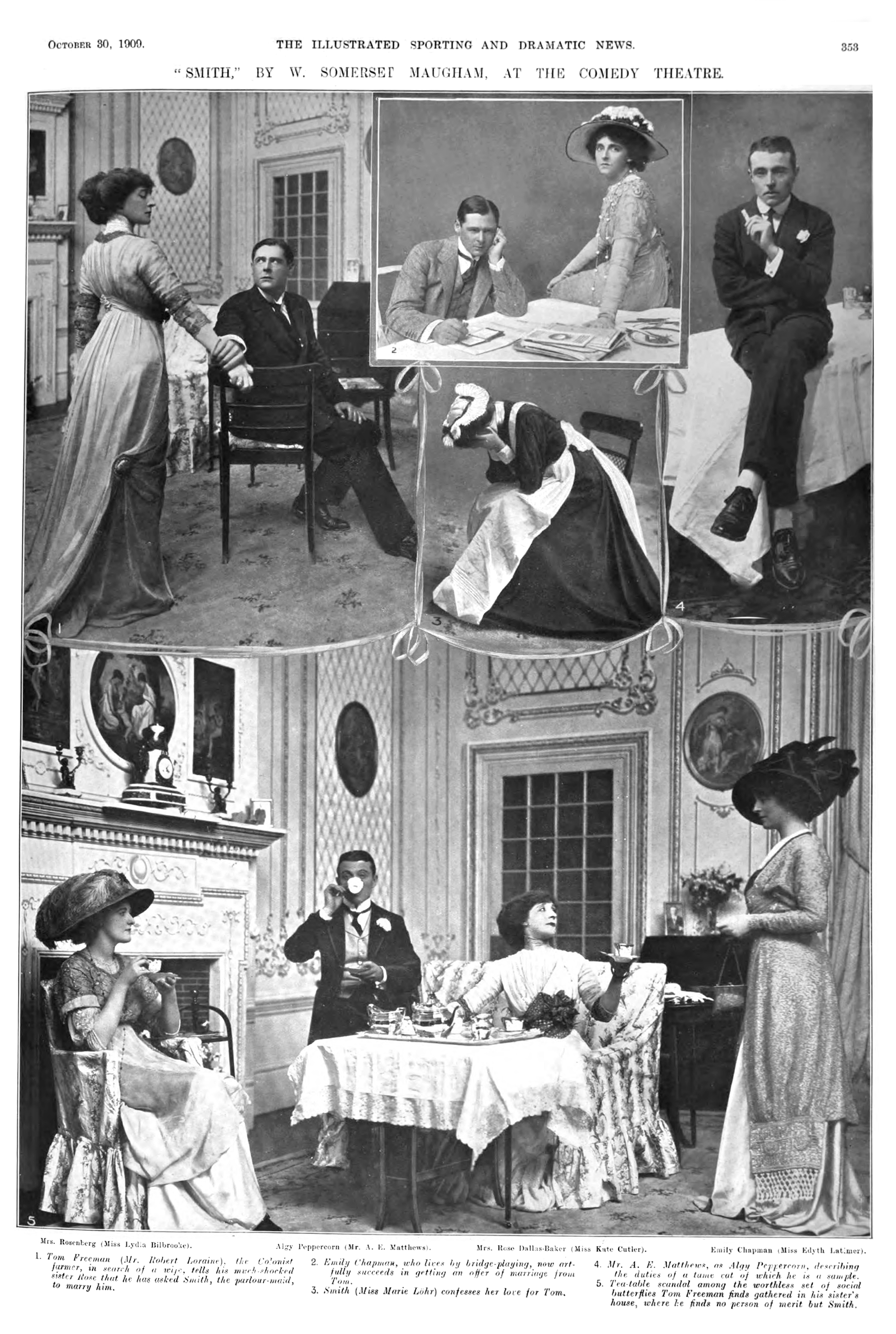
Montage of still photographs from the 1909 London production of Smith. Illustrated Sporting and Dramatic News, 30 October 1909.

The following captions accompany a montage of photographs from the original production of the play:

1. Tom Freeman (Mr. Robert Loraine), the Colonist farmer, in search of a wife, tells his much-shocked sister Rose that he has asked Smith, the parlour-maid, to marry him.
2. Emily Chapman, who lives by bridge-playing, now artfully succeeds in getting an offer of marriage from Tom.
3. Smith (Miss Marie Lohr) confesses her love for Tom.
4. Mr. A.E. Matthews, as Algy Peppercorn, describing the duties of a tame cat of which he is a sample.
5. Tea-table scandal among the worthless set of social butterflies Tom Freeman finds gathered in his sister's house, where he finds no person of merit but Smith.

=== Act I ===
In 1909, in the drawing-room of the flat in Kensington of Herbert Dallas-Baker KC and his wife Rose, Rose is playing bridge with her well-dressed guests Emily Chapman, Mrs Otto Rosenberg and Algernon Peppercorn. Rose is expecting her brother Thomas Freeman to arrive from Rhodesia, where he has a farm. After the game, they talk about Emily, while she is out of the room: Tom once proposed to her, and by now she may have missed her chance of marriage. Tom arrives. He went to Rhodesia after losing everything in the slump, and, having made some money, is here for six weeks, intending to find a wife. They talk about the parlourmaid Smith, who appears briefly in the room, and speculate on whom she might marry.

=== Act II ===
In the dining-room, there is a series of conversations. Fletcher, the porter of the flats, talks to Smith. He hopes they would get married, but Smith is not interested. Later, Smith and Tom talk: he learns about her background, and wonders whom she might marry. He talks to Dallas-Baker, saying that he suspects Rose and Algy see too much of each other. Algy tells Tom about himself. He does not work, saying "Work is merely the refuge from boredom of the unintellectual". Rose enters: she is angry with Tom, after Dallas-Baker told her about Tom's suspicions. Finally, Emily and Tom talk alone, years after they last met: he says "We were both very unfit for marriage in those days". He proposes again.

=== Act III ===
In the drawing-room two weeks later, Mrs Otto Rosenberg arrives late for their game of bridge, having had many social appointments. Tom says "There really should be an eight hours' day for the idle rich". There is a telephone call for her; Smith, having been told to ask the caller what it is about, says that Mrs Otto's baby, whose ill-health has been mentioned in conversation, has died. The caller had phoned earlier, but was told only that Mrs Otto was not there. Tom observes: "The only person who seems to care a damn was—Smith." Tom and Emily talk: having been in each other's company for two weeks, they realize that marriage would not work. Emily suggests that Tom should marry Smith. Later, talking to Smith, Tom describes his life as a farmer. He suggests they should marry, but Smith declines.

=== Act IV ===
In the drawing-room a week later, Emily visits to say that she is going to live in Australia; Mrs Otto visits, saying that Otto, angry with her for the circumstances of their baby's death, wants her to give up seeing the people she has been socializing with. Tom gives his opinion of the social set at his sister's home: "It took me some time to discover that you weren't real people at all.... You're too trifling to be wicked.... You want nothing very much except to be amused...." Rose, learning from Tom that he has asked Smith to marry him, fires Smith, saying afterwards to Tom: "You've made me the laughing-stock of the whole place". Algy tells Rose that he has got engaged to a daughter of a rich American family; like Mrs Otto and Emily, he will not return. Tom says to her: "I think they left you because you never tried to make them your friends". To bring Smith, Tom drops a vase. She finally consents to marry him, and tells him her first name is Mary.
