= The Recoil (1922 film) =

1922 film

- Directed by: Geoffrey Malins
- Written by: Rafael Sabatini
- Produced by: Sam Hardy
- Starring: Annie Esmond; Lawrence Anderson; Dawson Milward
- Production company: Hardy Films
- Distributed by: Stoll Pictures
- Release date: March 1922
- Country: United Kingdom
- Languages: Silent; English intertitles

The Recoil is a 1922 British silent crime film directed by Geoffrey Malins and starring Annie Esmond, Lawrence Anderson and Dawson Milward.

The film's plot involves a psychic expert who hypnotises his cousin to shoot his rich uncle. The film is based on a novel by Rafael Sabatini and was made by Stoll Pictures at Cricklewood Studios.

== Cast ==
- Annie Esmond as Miss Orpington
- Lawrence Anderson as Digby Raikes
- Dawson Milward as Anthony Orpington
- Eille Norwood as Francis
- Phyllis Titmuss as Adelaide Wallace

== Bibliography ==
- Goble, Alan. The Complete Index to Literary Sources in Film. Walter de Gruyter, 1999.
