= The Great Adventure (1921 film) =

1921 film

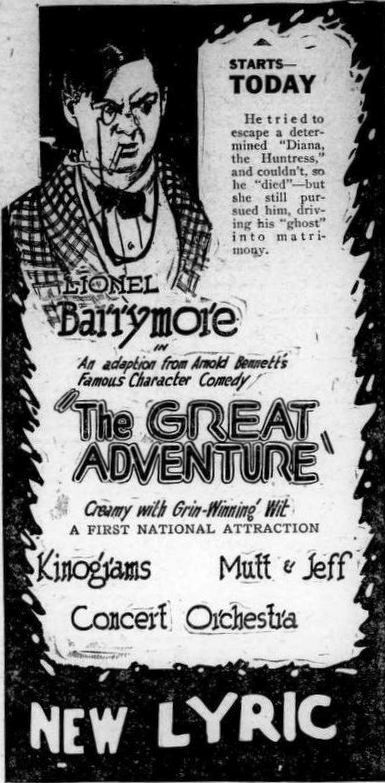
- Newspaper ad
- Directed by: Kenneth Webb
- Written by: Dorothy Farnum
- Based on: Buried Alive by Arnold Bennett
- Produced by: Whitman Bennett
- Starring: Lionel Barrymore
- Cinematography: Tom L. Griffith; Harry Stradling
- Distributed by: First National Pictures (as Associated First National)
- Release date: January 6, 1921
- Running time: 6 reels
- Country: United States
- Language: Silent (English intertitles)

The Great Adventure is a 1921 American silent romantic comedy film produced by Whitman Bennett and distributed by First National Pictures, then called Associated First National. The film was directed by Kenneth Webb and starred Lionel Barrymore. Fredric March made his screen debut in this film. The film is based upon the 1908 novel Buried Alive by Arnold Bennett. It was remade in 1933 as His Double Life starring Lillian Gish. The Great Adventure is a surviving feature film held by the Library of Congress.

== Plot ==
As summarized in a film publication, Priam Farll, England's noted artist, goes to Warsaw with his valet Henry Leek to escape Lady Sophia Entwhistle, who is bound to wed him. Sophia follows him to Warsaw and, for the reason of not knowing what else to do, the artist becomes engaged to her. The next day he escapes and returns to London, where his valet dies. Priam gives the deceased valet's name as "Priam Farll" and assumes the valet's name as his own. He attends his own funeral in Westminster where he encounters Lady Sophia in deep mourning weeping bitterly. He leaves before she notices him. Among the valet's letters is one noting an appointment. Priam keeps the late valet's date which turns out to be with a widow who had answered Henry's matrimonial ad. Priam marries the woman under the name Henry Leek. Lack of funds causes Priam to resume his painting, and when his work is recognized he refuses to admit his identity. But when it develops that the late Leek had a wife and two children, who arrive and demand their rights, Priam begins to weaken and eventually proves that he is Priam Farll on the condition that his identity remain secret to protect against Lady Sophia's breach of promise suit.

== Cast ==
- Lionel Barrymore - Priam Farll
- Doris Rankin - Alice Challice
- Octavia Broske - Lady Sophia Entwhistle
- Thomas Braidon - Henry Leek
- Arthur Rankin - Leek's Son
- Paul Kelly - Another Leek Son
- Maybeth Carr - Dorothy (a blind child)
- Charles Land - Charles Oxford
- Jed Prouty - Mr. Witt
- E. J. Ratcliffe - Lord Leonard Alcar
- Ivo Dawson - Duncan Farll
- Katherine Stewart - Mrs. Leek
- Fredric March - Extra (uncredited)
