= Marjorie Hume =

English actress (1893–1976)

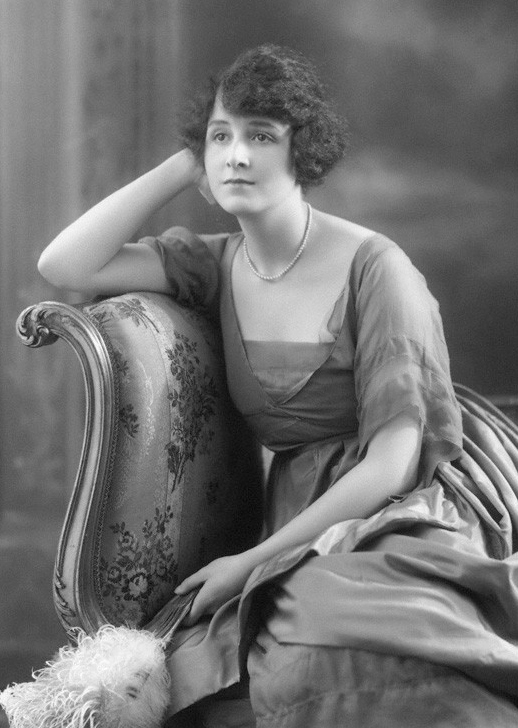
- Marjorie Hume in 1920
- Born: 27 January 1893; Great Yarmouth, Norfolk, England
- Died: 13 March 1976 (aged 83); Oxshott, Surrey, England
- Occupation: Actress
- Years active: 1917-1955

Marjorie Hume (27 January 1893 – 13 March 1976) was an English stage and film actress. She appeared in 36 films between 1917 and 1955.

== Selected filmography ==
- Doing His Bit (1917)
- Red Pottage (1918)
- The Swindler (1918)
- Lady Tetley's Decree (1920)
- The Scarlet Kiss (1920)
- Appearances (1921)
- The Great Day (1921)
- The Call of Youth (1921)
- Silent Evidence (1922)
- M'Lord of the White Road (1923)
- The Two Boys (1924)
- King of the Castle (1925)
- Thou Fool (1926)
- The Island of Despair (1926)
- One Colombo Night (1926)
- Young Woodley (1928)
- Up to the Neck (1933)
- A Royal Demand (1933)
- The White Lilac (1935)
- Cross Currents (1935)
- Member of the Jury (1937)
- The Limping Man (1953)
- Children Galore (1955)
