= Doormats (play) =

1912 play by Hubert Henry Davies

- Gerald du Maurier and Marie Lohr
- Original language: English
- Written by: Hubert Henry Davies
- First publication: 1920
- Subject: Romantic triangle
- Genre: Comedy
- Setting: Noel Gale's home in Chelsea

Premiere
- Date: October 3, 1912
- Place: Wyndham's Theatre
- Directed by: Gerald du Maurier
- Original run: 24 weeks

Doormats is a 1912 English play by Hubert Henry Davies. It is a comedy in three acts and as many settings, with six characters. The action of the play takes place over ten weeks time. The story concerns a demoralized artist, who allows another man to come between him and his wife. The title refers to the playwright's thesis that humans can be typed as yielding "doormats" and assertive "boots".

The play was first produced by Frank Curzon and Gerald du Maurier, who also staged it. Doormats starred Marie Lohr and Gerald du Maurier, with Dawson Milward. It had a West End premiere in early October 1912 and ran through March 1913, for 24 weeks total.

== Characters ==
Characters are listed in order of appearance within their scope.

Lead

- Noel Gale is 32, an artist; weak, sensitive, and indulgent to his wife's demands.
- Leila Gale is Noel's wife, playful and attractive, and determined to get her way.
- Captain Maurice Harding is a cavalry officer, whose portrait Noel is painting.

Supporting

- Lady Gale called Aunt Josephine, is 50, the kind, sweet wife of Sir Rufus Gale.
- Sir Rufus Gale is 65, the grumbling, selfish uncle of Noel, just returned from British India.

Featured

- Harrison is a neatly groomed young maid servant to the Gale's. (Note: This character is in the published play, but is not mentioned by any reviewer. A theatre program cast list, reproduced in both editions of the published play, shows the character was part of the production, but only the 1921 edition gives the name of the actress.)

Off-stage

- Elisha P. Welkin is an American who calls on Noel for a commission to decorate a US library.
- Alice is the married daughter of Rufus and Josephine, mother to their granddaughter.

== Synopsis ==

Act I (Studio of Noel Gale's home in Chelsea.) Uncle Rufus and Aunt Josephine pop in on Noel as he works on Captain Harding's portrait in the studio. The couple has just returned from British India upon the judge's retirement. Noel has given up St. Ives for Chelsea at his wife's insistence, to satisfy her desire for an active social life. He is reduced to portrait painting, which is not his métier. Leila is pleased to have found the portrait commission for Noel, particularly as Captain Harding is so charming. It is clear that Harding's interest in calling is focused on Leila and not the portrait. Leila takes Harding away to another room. Elisha P. Welkin wants Noel to come to America for a big commission. Noel is enthusiastic, but cannot convince Leila to come along. Uncle Rufus encourages Noel to go by himself, to recapture his confidence in his talent. Leila is, not surprisingly, pleased with Noel's decision. Uneasy, Noel asks Uncle Rufus and Aunt Josephine to stay with Leila while he is away. Rufus assures him she will grow fonder in his absence. The scene ends as it began, with Noel daubing at the portrait. (Slow curtain)

Act II (Drawing-room of Noel's home. Early afternoon, six weeks later.) Noel has been in America for six weeks. Harrison is looking for Leila; Captain Harding is waiting for her in the front hall. Aunt Josephine sends Harrison to fetch Leila from her bedroom. Rufus and Josephine are growing worried at Harding's persistence in calling on Leila. They decide to confront her, but she parries their concerns. Harding, tired of waiting, comes in and is surprised by his chilly reception. Leila just laughs and dismisses her husband's relations. Left alone, Harding and Leila discuss running away together, with the latter not wanting to hurt Noel, who is perfect for her. When they hear the old couple returning, they sneak into the studio. Rufus and Josephine discuss writing to Noel. They are just starting a letter when Noel surprises them; he has returned from America unexpectedly. His designs were a success and he has won the commission. He will return to America to execute it, this time taking Leila. The old couple's reticence alerts Noel. When Leila comes in followed by Harding, Noel is suspicious. Harding quickly leaves. Noel and Leila have an argument in which she alternately dismisses him and entices him back, playing Noel like a fiddle. Noel later confesses to Rufus that he has given in again. (Curtain)

Act III (Dining room of Noel's home. Breakfast time, a month later.) Rufus complains about his breakfast to Josephine, despite eating everything on offer including the food on her plate. Leila drifts in looking pale and sad. While Rufus joins Noel in the studio, Josephine tells Leila about a letter from her daughter Alice. Harrison approaches Leila after Josephine leaves: Captain Harding is waiting to see her. Leila has Harrison bring Harding to the dining room. Alone, Harding confesses his desperation to see her, but Leila is diffident. Noel has shut her out since he returned. Harding suggests taking a trip in his motor to Scotland or Dover, but Leila is not ready to cross that Rubicon. Noel has heard this last bit; he rushes at Harding, but Leila gets in between them. Noel asks Harding to wait in the drawing room. He tells Leila he knows she did not ask Harding here, that she has respected his position since he returned home, but he cannot go on being her jailor. He knows she loves Harding, and wants to be with him. Noel says if you both agree, I will go back to America for a year and allow you to accuse me of abandonment and divorce me. Leila goes to speak with Harding. Josephine now counsels Noel about boots and doormats, how they need one another. Leila comes back with Harding; they cannot allow Noel to sacrifice himself. They will only agree to him divorcing Leila. Noel argues with Harding, who reveals that he is unwilling to compromise for Leila's sake. She sends Harding away, declaring him too selfish. She now values Noel for his continual self-sacrifice, but he scolds her for presuming on his nature. Their future together is shaky, though he kisses her tenderly. (Curtain)

== Original production ==
=== Background ===
Producers Frank Curzon and Gerald du Maurier announced in May 1912 that they would present Doormats, a three-act comedy by Hubert Henry Davies at Wyndham's Theatre during October. Du Maurier said the play had five principal parts, expressing a dislike for "one-star" productions. By early July the cast was announced, though at this time it envisioned Charles Bryant in the Captain Harding role. The setting was described as Chelsea and the subject, married life.

Marie Lohr, who would play the female lead, married in early August 1912 and went to Italy on her honeymoon, while Gerald du Maurier took a long holiday in Cornwall. Rehearsals began in mid-September, by which time Dawson Milward had taken over the Captain Harding role.

=== Cast ===
Cast for the original West End production.
Role	Actor	Dates	Notes and sources
Noel Gale	Gerald du Maurier	Oct 3, 1912 – Mar 15, 1913	
Leila Gale	Marie Lohr	Oct 3, 1912 – Mar 15, 1913	
Captain Harding	Dawson Milward	Oct 3, 1912 – Mar 15, 1913	
Uncle Rufus	Alfred Bishop	Oct 3, 1912 – Mar 15, 1913	
Aunt Josephine	Nina Boucicault	Oct 3, 1912 – Mar 15, 1913	
Harrison	Miss Giles	Oct 3, 1912 – Mar 15, 1913	This actress is known only from a cast list reproduced in the 1921 edition of the play.

=== West End premiere and reception ===

Doormats had its West End premiere on October 3, 1912, at Wyndham's Theatre. The reviewer for the Evening Standard thought the play deserved a better title, and suggested it was really a "tragi-comedy". They wrote that it "is humorous and it is sad, light in texture but actual in meaning. It amuses while it hurts". They called the acting "perfection", but felt the one weak point of the play was the third act revelation of the Captain's true character; it was too sudden and obvious. The Daily Telegraph critic thought playwright Hubert Henry Davies had sacrificed realism for symmetry in devising his play's philosophy of "boots" and "doormats". The reviewer for The Guardian felt that playwright Hubert Henry Davies and actor Gerald du Maurier usually complemented each other, both demonstrating mastery of naturalism in their crafts, but with this play seriousness strained the symbiosis evident in their lighter collaborations. They judged Nina Boucicault's Aunt Josephine as the most charming character.

=== West End closing ===
The production closed at Wyndham's Theatre on Saturday, March 15, 1913, after running for 24 weeks. (Note: At the standard rate of six evening and two matinee shows per week, this would total 196 performances.) Doormats was released for touring to producers Sydney Brangsgrove and N. C. Slaughter by the end of February 1913.

== Bibliography ==
- Hubert Henry Davis. Doormats: A Comedy in Three Acts. Samuel French, Ltd. London, 1920.
- Hubert Henry Davis. The Plays of Hubert Henry Davis, Volume II. Chatto & Windus, 1921.
