= The Eleventh Commandment (play) =

1921 play

- Original language: English
- Written by: Brandon Fleming
- Genre: Drama

Premiere
- Date: 7 November 1921
- Place: Playhouse Theatre, Cardiff

The Eleventh Commandment is a 1921 play by Brandon Fleming. It premiered at the Playhouse Theatre, Cardiff before transferring to the Royalty Theatre in London's West End where it ran for 32 performances between 16 January and 11 February 1922. The original West End cast included Henry Stoker, Edmund Breon, Dawson Milward and Viola Tree.

== Film adaptation ==
In 1924 it was made into a British silent film of the same title directed by George A. Cooper and starring Fay Compton, Stewart Rome and Lillian Hall-Davis.

== Bibliography ==
- Goble, Alan. The Complete Index to Literary Sources in Film. Walter de Gruyter, 1999.
- Wearing, J. P. The London Stage 1920-1929: A Calendar of Productions, Performers, and Personnel. Rowman & Littlefield, 2014.
