= Darling of the Day =

- Original Cast Recording
- Music: Jule Styne
- Lyrics: E. Y. Harburg
- Book: Nunnally Johnson
- Basis: Novel Buried Alive by Arnold Bennett
- Productions: 1968 Broadway; 2005 Illinois

Darling of the Day is a musical with a book by Nunnally Johnson, lyrics by E. Y. Harburg, and music by Jule Styne. Based on the Arnold Bennett novel Buried Alive and his play The Great Adventure, the original 1968 Broadway production starred Vincent Price and Patricia Routledge, who won the Tony Award for Best Actress in a Musical.

== Synopsis ==
In 1905 London, Priam Farll is an artist, brilliant, unconventional and shy, although he can be violently outspoken. He once offended Queen Victoria and was exiled to the South Pacific (shades of Gauguin), but Edward VII has succeeded to the throne, and Farll has been recalled to London to receive a knighthood.

Appalled by "society's" expectations of its "darling of the day" (a common Victorian/Edwardian term meaning something like "fashionable celebrity") Farll seizes the chance to "get out of the world alive" when his faithful butler Henry Leek suddenly dies, and their identities are confused by an official. Instead of correcting the error, Farll quietly assumes the identity of the deceased, and Leek's corpse is officially buried in Westminster Abbey as the famous artist.

He soon finds himself married to Alice Challice, a bright, well-to-do widow who had been corresponding with the real Henry Leek – and settles down to a happy "upper working class" existence. Farll continues to paint, and when his wife runs into financial difficulties he sells a few paintings. Complications naturally ensue, and his "cover" becomes increasingly flimsy. Just as it looks as if he will be compelled to resume his real identity, a piece of truly Gilbertian nonsense brings all to a satisfactory conclusion, and he is allowed to stay plain Henry Leek after all.

== Original cast and characters ==
Character	Broadway (1968)
Priam Farll	Vincent Price
Alice Challice	Patricia Routledge
Lady Vale	Brenda Forbes
Oxford	Peter Woodthorpe
Alf	Teddy Green
Pennington	Michael Lewis
Daphne	Joy Nichols
Duncan	Mitchell Jason
Henry Leek	Charles Welch
Doctor / Judge	Leo Leyden
Rosalind	Beth Howland
Bert	Marc Jordan
Mrs. Leek	Camila Ashland

== Song list ==
Act I

- Mad For Art - Chorus
- He's A Genius - Oxford, Priam, Henry
- To Get Out Of This World Alive - Priam
- It's Enough To Make A Lady Fall In Love - Alice, Alf, Bert, Chorus
- A Gentleman's Gentleman - Company
- Double Soliloquy - Priam & Alice
- Let's See What Happens - Alice & Priam
- Panache - Oxford & Lady Vale
- I've Got A Rainbow Working For Me - Priam & Chorus
- Money, Money, Money - Alf, Bert, Sydney
- That Something Extra Special - Alice

Act II

- What Makes a Marriage Merry - Company
- He's A Genius (Reprise) - Oxford & Chorus
- Not On Your Nellie - Chorus
- Sunset Tree - Priam & Alice
- Butler In The Abbey - Priam & Chorus
- Not On Your Nellie (Reprise) - Company

An original cast recording was released by RCA Victor.

== Development ==
There had been discussions since 1964 to turn the novel Buried Alive into a musical. The book was first written by Keith Waterhouse and Willis Hall, with Peter Wood to direct and Geraldine Page to star, with music by Jules Styne and lyrics by E.Y. Harburg (who was suggested Styne). However, S. N. Behrman wrote a new book, and Albert Marre was hired to direct. Fred Saidy also worked on the book. Eventually, Nunnally Johnson (who adapted the novel into the film Holy Matrimony) wrote the book, and Steven Vinaver directed. Various actors turned down the lead including Laurence Olivier, Peter Finch, Rex Harrison, and John Gielgud.

The show marked Vincent Price's first appearance on Broadway since 1954. It was budgeted at $500,000, $150,000 of which came from a record sale to RCA.

The show previewed in Toronto under the title Married Alive (it was also known as The Great Adventure). Johnson felt Price played his role too sympathetically:

Ninety-nine out of one hundred actors want to be loved. They've just killed their mothers, their fathers, three children, but they want to be loved. I talked to him about it beforehand. He looked so good for the part, and I said, 'Have you heard of Beecham, the conductor?' He said, 'Oh, yes, yes, yes.' I said, 'Try to think of yourself as Beecham, very cultivated, very aristocratic, egotistical, acrid, a little nasty. Play it that way.' 'Wonderful,' he said, and then he went out and played it like ZaSu Pitts."

The musical finally reached New York City where, following three previews, it opened on January 27, 1968, at the George Abbott Theatre and closed after only 31 performances. Choreography was by Lee Theodore, staging by Noel Willman, scenic design by Oliver Smith, costumes by Raoul Pene Du Bois, and lighting by Peggy Clark.

Before rehearsals started, Vinaver had been fired, replaced by Albert Marre, then rehired. After bad reviews in Toronto and Boston, Vinaver was fired again and replaced by Noel Willman. Roger O. Hirson revised the book. Johnson, upset with all the changes, demanded his name be removed from the credits.

In addition to Vincent Price (in his first and only Broadway musical) as Priam Farll and Patricia Routledge as Alice Challice, the cast included Brenda Forbes, Peter Woodthorpe, and Teddy Green.

Reviews were mixed, although positive from Walter Kerr and Clive Barnes in The New York Times. However they did not cover the first night, another critic did.

The show was Price's first singing role since the 1940 film The House of the Seven Gables. Price had once been a member of the Yale Glee Club and proved to have an adequate singing voice. Harburg and Styne considered the piece their best work.

== Revivals ==
Attempts at major revival have made little headway, although there have been several staged concerts and one fully staged revised version. 42nd Street Moon in San Francisco, California, presented the musical as a staged concert in 1994. The York Theatre Company in Manhattan has twice presented the musical as a staged concert production, first in fall 1998 and again in spring 2005, with the latter featuring Beth Fowler, Rebecca Luker, Simon Jones, and Stephen Mo Hanan. Light Opera Works, in Evanston, Illinois, presented a fully staged version in 2005 revised by Erik Haagensen based on his earlier work for the York Theatre Company concerts. This was the first complete staged production since the musical closed on Broadway.

In 2010, the Discovering Lost Musicals series in London presented the show in concert at the Ondaatje Wing Theatre of the National Portrait Gallery, starring Nicholas Jones as Priam and Louise Gold as Alice. The show received its first full U.K. production at the Union Theatre in March 2013, with James Dinsmore as Priam, Katy Secombe as Alice, and Rebecca Caine as Lady Vale.

== Response ==
The show was profiled in the William Goldman book The Season: A Candid Look at Broadway. Goldman later wrote:

This was a Kiss of Death production from the start. As early as August, well before the show went into rehearsal, rumors were strong that the director was going to be fired. The rumors turned out to be not so much wrong as premature: the director went in December. The librettist also left along the way, and the show opened in New York with no one getting credit for the book, never a happy sign. The creative people knew it was a disaster before it opened; one of them advised a friend, "Don't come."

The New York Times review called the musical bland and stale, but praised Routledge, who "...really can sing." "The high point of 'Darling of the Day' is a thumping good production number in the local pub ("Not on Your Nellie") in which Miss Routledge, somewhat sozzled, kicks up her heels with a bunch of the boys." Price plays with "friendly blandness...he sings, too, and not badly." The score is as slight as it is consonant."

Walter Kerr wrote that "the score is one of the very best Jule Styne has ever composed for the theater", that Harburg's "lyrics are much more fun than the cloddish rhyming we're accustomed to" and the book "is full of pleasant surprises." He praised Routledge:"the most spectacular, most scrumptious, most embraceable musical comedy debut since Beatrice Lillie and Gertrude Lawrence came to this country as a package."

According to theatre writer and historian John Kenrick, many critics felt that Vincent Price was "woefully miscast". There was, however, unanimous praise for Routledge. The book is criticized as having a "hopelessly silly plot and an endlessly chatty libretto ..." but "the score is a lost musical gem that is well worth hearing".

Kenrick wrote that "One can only hope that this all too brief run [at the York] will inspire someone in the New York area to give this show the fully staged revival it richly deserves."

Ethan Mordden wrote that Vincent Price was blamed by some for the failure of the show; however, "he played the role quite well and even held his own in eight numbers." The score was blamed by others: "... it hasn't one potential hit ... It's halfway back to operetta, and this was not a time that admired the style." Finally, wrote Mordden, "It needed a strong director. It needed a director, period."

According to Ken Mandlebaum:

I've never agreed that Vincent Price was the reason the show failed; he was not ideal, but I doubt the show would have succeeded with another leading man ... The biggest problem was not the book or score, but simply that Darling of the Day played like a flop, lacking in energy and stodgy in the extreme. There was a noticeable lack of directorial invention, and the show simply laid there, with only Routledge to activate it from time to time. But the fundamental story is sound, and, using most of the score and revising the book a bit, a talented director might be able to make Darling of the Day into a decent evening.
