= Hubert Henry Davies =

British playwright and dramatist

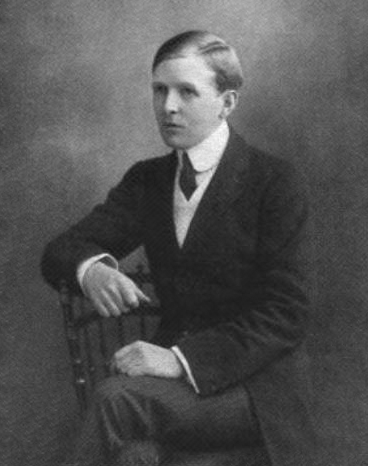
- In The Sketch, 15 July 1903
- Born: 17 March 1869; Woodley, Cheshire, England
- Died: 17 August 1917 (aged 48); Robin Hood's Bay, Yorkshire, England
- Occupations: Dramatist, playwright, journalist
- Known for: The Mollusc

Hubert Henry Davies (17 March 1869 – 17 August 1917) was a leading British playwright and dramatist of the early 20th century, following in the tradition of Arthur Wing Pinero and Henry Arthur Jones, but influenced profoundly by Thomas William Robertson.

== Career ==
Hubert Henry Davies was born in Woodley, Cheshire, and spent some time as a journalist in San Francisco. He began his career in New York with The Weldons (1899), and on his return to Britain, collaborated successfully with the actor-manager Charles Wyndham to produce four West End productions including Cousin Kate (Theatre Royal Haymarket, 1903) and Mrs. Gorringe's Necklace (Wyndham's Theatre, 1903).

His best known work was The Mollusc. Originally produced by and starring Charles Wyndham at the Criterion Theatre in 1907, it was revived in London at the Arts Theatre in 1949, at Liverpool Playhouse in 2006 (although the title was changed to The Lady of Leisure), and at the Finborough Theatre in 2007; the play also was made into a movie. His plays were successful in New York. Other published plays were Cynthia (1903), Captain Drew on Leave, Lady Epping's Lawsuit, Bevis, A Single Man, Doormats, and Outcast (1914).

== Later life and death ==
During the First World War, he worked in France as a hospital orderly, which led to a nervous breakdown. He was reported missing while staying at Robin Hood's Bay, Yorkshire in August 1917. His cap was found on the beach there, and he was presumed to have drowned.

== Productions ==
Davies' Mrs. Gorringe's Necklace was a staple of Australian theatre since 1906 when it was produced by the Flemming-Brough Company.

It was produced at the People's Theatre, Royal Arcade, Newcastle upon Tyne, by the Clarion Theatre in October 1923.
