= Wish Wynne =

British music hall performer and radio actress (1879–1931)

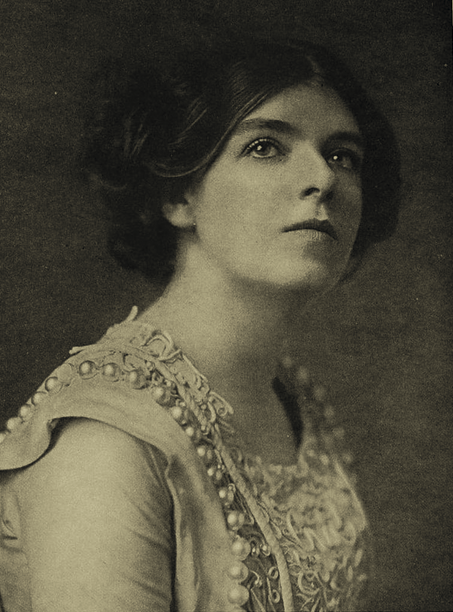
Wynne in 1914

Wish Wynne (born Ethel Constance Eliza Gilchrist; 19 February 1879 – 41 November 1931) was a British music hall performer and radio actress.

== Life ==
Wish Wynne was born on 19 February 1879, in Croydon, to Irish/Scottish parents. She made her first stage appearance at age 12, in the pantomime Dick Whittington at Drury Lane. She subsequently became a music hall act, with character songs and comic monologues which she accompanied herself on the piano. In 1910 Wynne made her American debut, and she returned to tour there in 1912. E. V. Lucas, writing in the Pall Mall Gazette in 1911, praised Wynne as "a new variety of singer" and "a performer whose every word is of value".

Wynne made her West End acting debut as Janet Cannot in Arnold Bennett's The Great Adventure, produced by Granville Barker. The play opened in March 1913 and enjoyed a successful run until November 1914. Bennett referred to Wynne in his journal as a "genius". She was profiled as "Wish Wynne: The Hit of the London Season" in Nash's Magazine for August 1913.

For the next decade, Wynne divided her time between the music hall and the theatre, touring South Africa, Australia, the United States and South America. She first broadcast on radio in 1924, for the British Broadcasting Company, and later its successor, the British Broadcasting Corporation, building a popular broadcast reputation for fairy stories told in Cockney dialect.

In 1927, she acted in Double Dan, a farce by Edgar Wallace.

She died on 14 November 1931, aged 52, in St Bartholomew's Hospital. The Times obituarist wrote:

She had been in ill health for some time, and had a severe operation in 1930. The public knew nothing of her state of health; and, in order to keep an engagement to broadcast last Saturday night, she left her sickbed in St. Bartholomew’s Hospital. When her work was done she collapsed, and death followed two or three days of coma. She will be sorely missed by a very large public of admirers.
