= Marie Lohr =

Australian actress (1890–1975)

- Lohr in 1918
- Born: Marie Kate Wouldes Lohr; 28 July 1890; Sydney, New South Wales, Australia
- Died: 21 January 1975 (aged 84); Brighton, Sussex, England
- Other name: Marie Löhr
- Occupation: Actress
- Years active: 1894–1968
- Spouse: Anthony Prinsep
- Mother: Kate Bishop

Marie Kate Wouldes Lohr (28 July 1890 – 21 January 1975) was an Australian-born actress, active on stage and in film in Britain. During a career of more than 60 years she created roles in plays by, among others, Bernard Shaw, J. M. Barrie, Frederick Lonsdale, Somerset Maugham, William Douglas-Home and Noël Coward. She appeared mainly in the West End, but toured the British provinces at intervals throughout her career, appeared in Broadway productions and toured Canada.

== Biography ==
Marie Löhr was born in Sydney, New South Wales, to Lewis J. Löhr, treasurer of the Melbourne opera house, and his wife, the English actress Kate Bishop (1848–1923). Her maternal uncle Alfred Bishop and her godparents, William and Madge Kendal, were also actors. She moved with her mother to England in 1898 and began to act as a child. Lohr married Anthony Leyland Prinsep, a theatrical producer, at St-Martin-in-the-Fields in 1912. They divorced in 1928. On the death of Madge Kendal in 1935, Lohr inherited the Kendals' property at Filey.

Lohr died at the age of 84, and was buried in the Brompton Cemetery in west London.

== Career ==
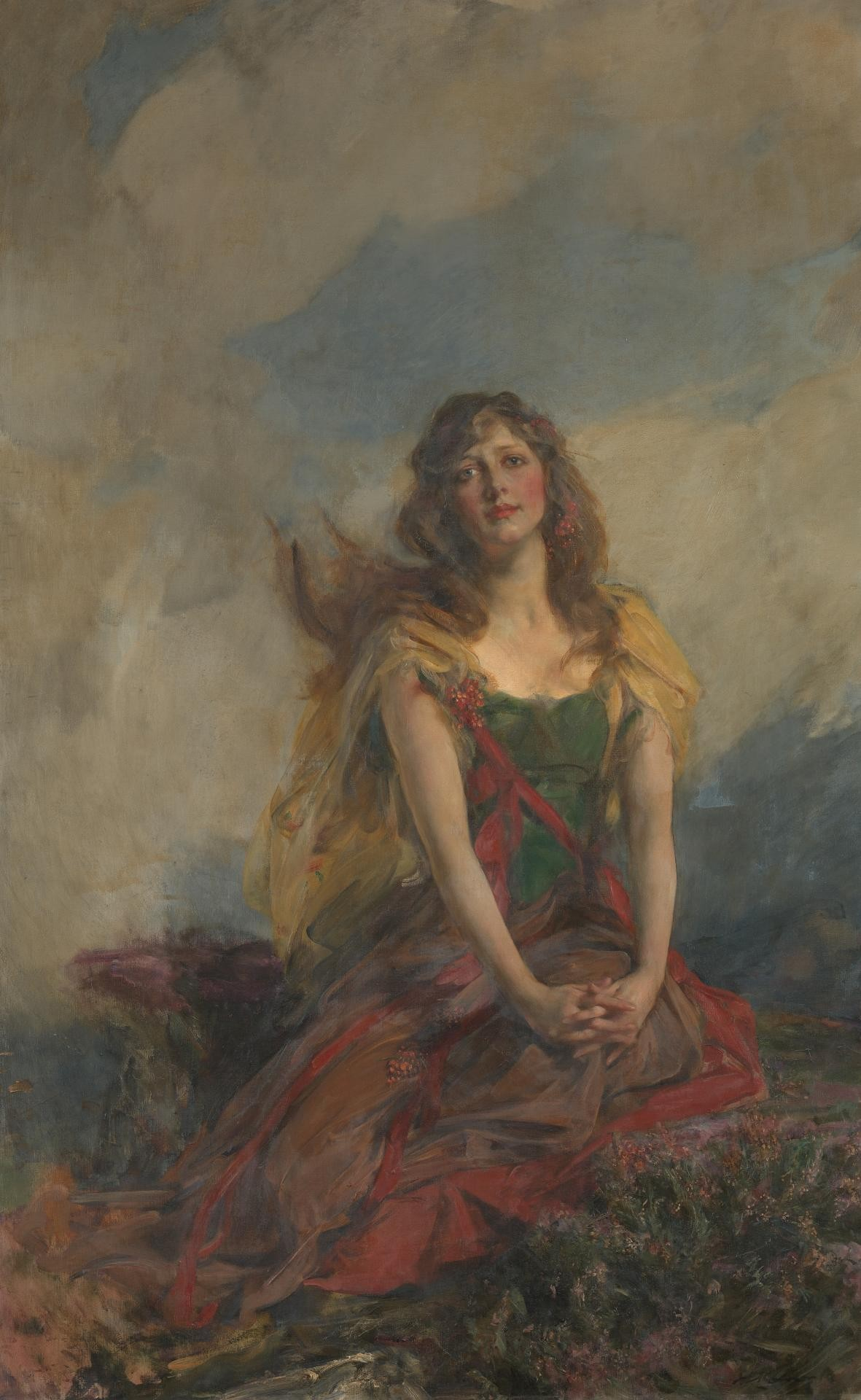
Marie Lohr as Lady Babbie by James Jebusa Shannon, 1914. She is shown in her role from The Little Minister

Lohr's first stage appearance was in Sydney, aged four, in The World Against Her. Her London debut (after the family's move to Britain), was at age ten, in Shockheaded Peter as well as The Man Who Stole the Castle. (Shockheaded Peter starred Lohr's mother and George Grossmith Jr., and was produced at the Garrick Theatre in 1900.) The run was curtailed by the death of Queen Victoria, and brought back in 1901, a critic commented "one little actress, 'A Child', represented by Miss Marie Lohr, I think, being particularly good". Her subsequent stage career was:

Year	Venue	Role
1902	on tour with the Kendals	Barbara Trecarre in St Martin's Summer
1903	West Pier, Brighton	Ellie Harthover in Water Babies
1904	on tour	Trixie Blenkinsopp in Whitewashing Julia
1905	St James's	The Princess in White Magic
	Comedy	Miss Petherton in The Duffer
1906	Daly's	Ernestine in The Little Michus
	on tour with the Kendals	Clara in A Tight Corner etc.
	His Majesty's	Rosey Mackenzie in Colonel Newcome
	Shakespeare, Battersea	Lillian Nugent in The Adventurer
1907	on tour with the Kendals	Muriel Lestrange in The Melcombe Marriage etc.
	Haymarket	Beatrix Dupré in My Wife
	on tour with the Kendals	Joy Marrable in The Other Side
1908	Haymarket	Irene Forster in Her Father
	Haymarket	Mrs Reginald Bridgenorth in Getting Married
	His Majesty's	Margaret in Faust at September
	His Majesty's	Hannele in the play of that name and Cinderella in Pinkie and the Fairies
1909	His Majesty's	Lydia Bashville in The Admirable Bashville
	His Majesty's	Sybil Crake in The Dancing Girl
	His Majesty's	Lady Teazle in The School for Scandal
	His Majesty's	Ophelia in Hamlet
	Comedy	Smith in the comedy of that name
	Playhouse	Juliet in Little Mrs Cummin
	Playhouse	Tommy in Tantalizing Tommy
1911	Comedy	Josepha Quarendon in Preserving Mr Panmure
	Prince of Wales	Alix Maubrun in Better Not Enquire
	His Majesty's	Spring in The Vision of Delight
	Comedy	Fernande de Monclars in The Marionettes
1912	Duke of York's	Lily Paradell in The 'Mind-the-Paint' Girl
	Duke of York's	Lady Thomasin Belturbet in a revival of The Amazons
	Wyndham's	Leila Gale in Doormats
1913	Savoy	Adele Vernet in The Grand Seigneur
1914	His Majesty's	Yo-San in The Darling of the Gods
	Wyndham's	Rose Effick in The Clever Ones
	His Majesty's	Olive Skinner in the all-star revival of The Silver King given in aid of King George's Actors' Pension Fund
	Duke of York's	Lady Babbie in The Little Minister
1915	St James's	Queen Charlotte in Kings and Queens
	Haymarket	Nelly in Five Birds in a Cage
	His Majesty's	Marie-Odile in the play of that name
	Wyndham's	Lady Ware in The Ware Case
1916	Coliseum	appeared in J. M. Barrie's skit The Real Thing at Last
	Globe	Bettina Dean in The Show Shop
	New	Irene Randolph in Her Husband's Wife
	Royalty	Constance Luscombe in Home on Leave
1917	Royalty	Remnant in the play of that name
	Haymarket	Joan Rochford in The Mirror
1918	Globe	Sybil Bruce in Love in a Cottage
	Globe	Lady Anthony Fitzurse in Press the Button
	Globe	Lady Gillian Dunsmore in Nurse Benson
	Globe	Francis Charles in L'Aiglon (single performance with an "all-star'" cast)
1919	Globe	Lena in Victory
	Globe	Francis Charles in revival of L'Aiglon
	Globe	Lady Caryll in The Voice from the Minaret
	Globe	Constance in Birds of a Feather
1920	Globe	Comtesse de Candale in A Marriage of Convenience
	Globe	Dahlia Lavory in Every Woman's Privilege
	Globe	Princess Fédora Romanova in a revival of Fédora
1921	Globe	February Lady Aline Draper in The Hour and the Man
	Globe	Irene Randolph in a revival of Her Husband's Wife
	Canadian tour	Repertory of plays
1922	Hudson Theatre, New York	Lady Caryll in A Voice from the Minaret
	Hudson Theatre, New York	Princess Fédora Romanova in a revival of Fédora
	Globe	Colette Vandieres in The Return
	Globe	Lady Marjorie Colladine in The Laughing Lady
1923	Globe	The Hon Margot Tatham in Aren't We All?
1924	Comedy	Ruth Tedcastle in Far Above Rubies
	Adelphi and Wyndham's	Lady Ware in a revival of The Ware Case
1925	Wyndham's	Nancy Last in A Man With a Heart
1926	on tour with Oscar Asche	Dorothy Travers in Big Business
	Playhouse	Isabella Trench in Caroline
	on tour	Margaret Armstrong in The Love Game
	Apollo and Prince of Wales	Susan Marvill in Tuppence Coloured
	Coliseum	Valerie Ashton in Richmond Park
	Gaiety	Mrs Darling in Peter Pan
1928	on tour	Lady Lancaster in The Temptation of Eve
	Old Vic	Mother Earth in Adam's Opera
	Garrick	May Smythe in These Pretty Things
	Garrick	Mrs Darling in Peter Pan
1929	His Majesty's	Lady Patricia in Beau Geste
	Lyric	Duchess of Devonshire in Berkeley Square
	Arts and Garrick	May Smythe in revival of These Pretty Things
	Apollo	Lady Lavinia Quinton in Yesterday's Harvest
	Ambassador's	Joan Trevor in A Girl's Best Friend
	St James's	Mrs Darling in Peter Pan
1930	Lyric, Hammersmith	Georgina Tidman in Dandy Dick
	Comedy	Mary Howard in The Silent Witness
	Vaudeville	Margery Battle in The Breadwinner
1931	Shaftesbury	Mary in Mr Faintheart
	Prince of Wales	Margaret Armstrong in The Love Game
	Booth Theatre, New York	Margery Battle in The Breadwinner
1932	Vaudeville	Margaret Westcott in Important People
	Coliseum	Empress Marie Therese of Austria in Casanova
1933	Embassy	Mrs Grey in Sometimes Even Now
	Playhouse	Lady L'Estrange in So Good! So Kind!!
	Palladium	Mrs Darling in Peter Pan
1934	Cambridge	Mary in Birthday
	Palladium	Mrs Darling in Peter Pan
1935	Court	Lady Frinton in Aren't We All?
	Daly's	Mrs Sydney Rankin in Chase the Ace
	Arts	Mrs Cloys in The Benefit of the Doubt
	Globe	Muriel Weston in Call It a Day
1936	Aldwych	Mabel in Family Hold Back
1937	Savoy	Appeared in the revue And On We Go
	Drury Lane	Duchess of Cheviot in Crest of the Wave
1938	Wyndham's	Mary Jarrow in Quiet Wedding
1939	Lyric	Pansy Bird in Somewhere in England
1941	Ambassadors	Vera Sheldon in Other People's Houses
1946	Embassy	Mrs Brown in National Velvet
	Embassy	Mrs Jennings in Sense and Sensibility
1947	Duke of York's	Marquise de St Maur in Caste
	Strand	Gertrude Paradine in My Wives and I
1948	Phoenix	Dame Maud Gosport in A Harlequinade
1949	Apollo	Consuelo Howard in Treasure Hunt
1951	Haymarket	Hester Bellboys in A Penny For a Song
1952	on tour	Phillippa Bennington in Adam's Apple
	St James's	Mrs Jevons in Sweet Peril
1953	Haymarket	Lady Frinton in a revival of Aren't We All?
1954	Duchess	Countess of Lister in The Manor of Northstead
1956	Streatham Hill	Lady Graine in Jubilee Girl
	Fortune	Matilda "Hope" in The Devil Was Sick
1957	Cambridge	Lady Charlton in Silver Wedding
1958	Belgrade, Coventry	Lady Bracknell in Half in Earnest
	Grand, Leeds	Winifred Wing in These People Those Books
1959	Palace	Lady Mortlake in The World of Paul Slickey
1960	Duke of York's	May Davenport in Waiting in the Wings
1963	Ashcroft, Croydon	Aunt Fluffy in The West Lodge
	Haymarket	Lady Julia Marcia in The Ides of March
1964	Arts	Mrs Grisley-Williams in Mr Whatnot
1965–66	Arts, Vaudeville and Garrick	Mrs Whitefield in Man and Superman
1967	on tour	Lady Hunstanton in A Woman of No Importance

== Films and television ==
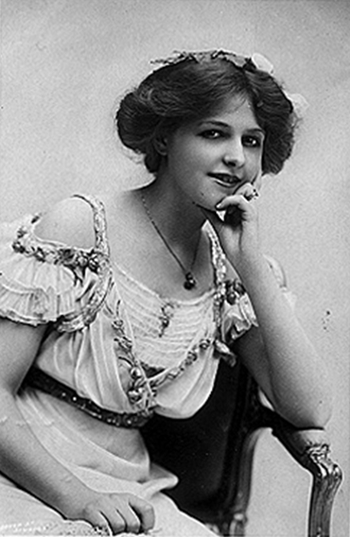
Marie Lohr. Early 1900s.

- The Real Thing at Last (1916, Short) – Murdered Woman
- Victory and Peace (1918) – Barbara Rowntree
- Aren't We All? (1932) – Lady Frinton
- Lady in Danger (1934) – Lady Brockley
- Road House (1934) – Lady Hamble
- Mon Coeur t'Appelle (1934, English version: My Heart is Calling You) – Modiste
- My Heart Is Calling (1935) – Manageress of Dress Salon
- Oh, Daddy! (1935) – Lady Linda Pye
- Royal Cavalcade (1935) – Mother
- Fighting Stock (1935) – Mrs. Barbara Rivers
- Cock o' the North (1935) – Mary Barton
- Foreign Affaires (1935) – Mrs. Cope
- Whom the Gods Love (1936) – the Empress
- Dreams Come True (1936) – Helen von Waldenau
- Reasonable Doubt (1936)
- It's You I Want (1936) – Constance Gilbert
- South Riding (1938) – Mrs. Beddows
- Pygmalion (1938) – Mrs. Higgins
- A Gentleman's Gentleman (1939) – Mrs. Handside-Lane
- George and Margaret (1940) – Alice
- Major Barbara (1941) – Lady Britomart
- Went the Day Well? (1942) – Mrs. Fraser
- Kiss the Bride Goodbye (1945) – Emma Blood
- Twilight Hour (1945) – Lady Chetwood
- The Rake's Progress (1945) – Lady Angela Parks
- The Magic Bow (1946) – Countess de Vermond
- The Ghosts of Berkeley Square (1947) – Lottie
- Anna Karenina (1948) – Princess Scherbatsky
- Counterblast (1948) – Mrs. Cole
- The Winslow Boy (1948) – Grace Winslow
- Silent Dust (1949) – Lady Clandon
- Little Big Shot (1952) – Mrs. Maddox
- Always a Bride (1953) – Dowager
- Out of the Clouds (1955) – Rich Woman
- Escapade (1955) – Stella Hampden, Senior
- On Such a Night (1955, Short) – Lady Falconbridge
- A Town Like Alice (1956) – Mrs. Dudley Frost
- Seven Waves Away (1957) – Dorothy Knudson
- Small Hotel (1957) – Mrs. Samson-Fox
- The Last Chronicle of Barset (1959, TV Series) – Lady Lufton
- Carlton-Browne of the F.O. (1959) – Lady Carlton-Browne
- The Plane Makers (1964, TV Series) – Geraldine Pettifur
- Great Catherine (1968) – Dowager Lady Gorse (final film role)

The Noël Coward play Present Laughter was shown as a "Play of the Week" broadcast by ATV in 1967, Lohr appeared alongside Peter O'Toole and Honor Blackman.

== Sources ==
- Herbert, Ian, ed. (1972). Who's Who in the Theatre (fifteenth ed.). London: Sir Isaac Pitman and Sons. ISBN 978-0-273-31528-5.
