= Katharine S. Macquoid =

English novelist and travel writer

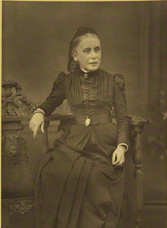
- Macquoid in an 1891 publication
- Born: Katherine Sarah Thomas; 26 January 1824; Kentish Town, London, England
- Died: June 1917 (aged 93); Tooting Commons, London, England
- Occupations: novelist; travel writer
- Spouse: Thomas Robert Macquoid (m. 1851)
- Children: Percy Macquoid, Gilbert Macquoid
- Writing career
- Notable work: Patty

Katharine Sarah Macquoid (née, Thomas; 26 January 1824 - June 1917) was an English novelist and travel writer, who published over 65 works. In addition to writing books, many of Macquoid's stories were published in magazines, the first story appearing in a publication called Welcome Guest, in 1859. Her first novel, A Bad Beginning: a story of a French marriage (1862), was successful. Probably her best story was Patty (1871).

== Early life and education ==
Katherine Sarah Thomas was born in Kentish Town, London, England, 26 January 1824. She was the third daughter of Thomas Thomas, a London merchant, and Phoebe Gadsden. She probably inherited her literary bent from her mother, who was a lover of books.

She was educated at home. At the age of 17 or 18, she was taken to France, where she lived for some years, an invaluable experience, as she found afterwards.

== Career ==
In 1851, she married Thomas Robert Macquoid, R.I.; he was a water colour painter, and a draughtsman in black and white. It was at her husband's suggestion that she began to write. A contributing factor suggested for her career as a professional writer, it has been suggested, was the need to find school fees for two sons at Marlborough College. She began with verse and stories for children, in The Welcome Guest, a weekly paper edited by John Maxwell, for which her husband acted as illustrator. A collection appeared as Piccalilli: a Mixture (1862).

In 1862, Macquoid's first novel was published, A Bad Beginning: a story of a French marriage. It was successful, and was followed by between 50 and 60 stories. Probably her best story was Patty (1871), which brought appreciative letters from John Morley and Sir Arthur Helps. The heroine was decidedly more naughty than mid-Victorian heroines were wont to be, and the book had deservedly a great vogue, firmly establishing the author's position. Macquoid also made her mark as the writer of travel books, such as Through Normandy, Through Brittany, In the Ardennes, Pictures in Umbria, and In the Volcanic Eifel, which were illustrated by her husband.

Macquoid had her early struggles for recognition, but she was encouraged at different times by George Lillie Craik, George Grove, G. H. Lewes, and Sir Frederic Leighton. Her work was appreciated by parents as her stories were not only interesting, but could be read with avidity by young girls for they were not "silly" or of the "milk-and-water" variety. They were well-written studies of lives and circumstances which young girls recognized as similar to their own.

== Personal life ==
The elder son was Percy Macquoid, R.I., designer and decorator. The second son, Gilbert Macquoid, was a solicitor, who edited Jacobite Songs and Ballads, and who assisted his mother in some of her travel books. She enjoyed reading, gardening, and foreign travel. Macquoid died at Tooting Commons, June 1917, aged 93.

== Selected works ==
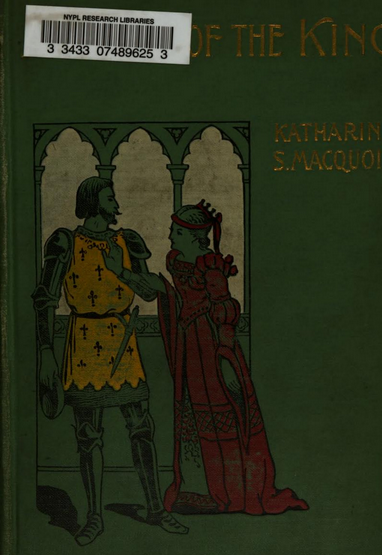
A Ward of the King: A Romance

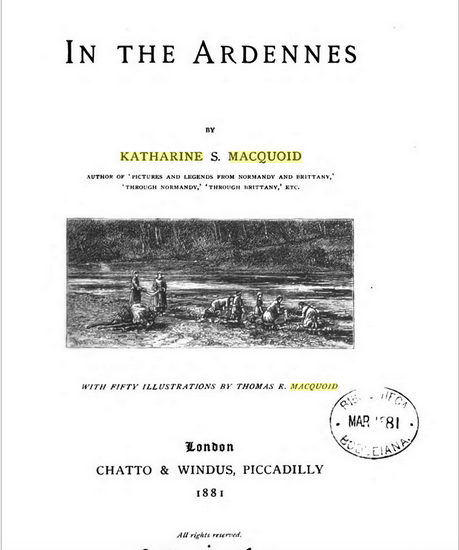
In the Ardennes

- Piccalilli, 1862
- A Bad Beginning, 1862
- Chesterford, 1863
- Hester Kirton, 1864
- By the Sea, 1865
- Elinor Dryden, 1867
- Charlotte Burney, 1867
- Wild as a Hawk (Marjorie), 1868
- Forgotten by the World, 1869
- Rookstone, 1871
- Patty, 1871
- Miriam's Marriage, 1872
- Pictures across the Channel, 1872
- Nicole Vagnon, 1873 - (Published in London by "Temple Bar", and reprinted in Boston by "Littell's Living Age"
- Too Soon, 1873
- Through Normandy, 1874
- My Story, 1874
- The Evil Eye, 1875
- Diane, 1875
- Lost Rose, 1876
- Through Brittany, 1877
- Doris Barugh, 1877
- Pictures and Legends from Normandy and Brittany, 1878 (with T. R. Macquoid)
- The Berkshire Lady, 1879
- In the Sweet Spring Time, 1880
- Beside the River, 1881
- Little Fifine, 1881
- In the Ardennes, 1881
- A Faithful Lover, 1882
- Her Sailor Love, 1888
- About Yorkshire, 1883 (with T. R. Macquoid)
- Under the Snow, 1884
- Louisa, 1885
- A Strange Company; and The Light on the Seine, 1885
- At the Red Glove, 1885
- A Little Vagabond, 1886
- Joan Wentworth, 1886
- Sir James Appleby, 1886
- Mere Suzanne, 1886
- At the Peacock, 1887
- Puff, 1888
- Elizabeth Morley, 1889
- Roger Ferron, 1889
- Pepin, 1889
- The Old Courtyard, 1890
- Cosette, 1890
- The Haunted Fountain, 1890
- At an old Chateau, 1891
- Driftin Apart, 1891
- The Prince's Whim, 1891
- Maisie Derrick, 1892
- Miss Eyon of Eyoncourt, 1892
- Berris, 1893
- In an Orchard, 1894
- Appledore Farm, 1894
- His Last Card, 1895
- In the Volcanic Eifel, 1896 (with Gilbert S. Macquoid)
- The Story of Lois, 1898
- A Ward of the King, 1898
