= King of the Castle (1926 film) =

1926 British film

- Directed by: Henry Edwards
- Written by: Keble Howard (novel); Alicia Ramsey (screenplay)
- Starring: Marjorie Hume; Brian Aherne; Dawson Milward; Moore Marriott
- Production company: Stoll Pictures
- Distributed by: Stoll Pictures
- Release date: March 1926
- Country: United Kingdom
- Languages: Silent; English intertitles

King of the Castle is a 1926 British silent drama film directed by Henry Edwards and starring Marjorie Hume, Brian Aherne and Dawson Milward. It was based on a 1922 novel by Keble Howard, who approved the scenario and wrote some of the intertitles.

Many of the outdoor scenes were filmed in Cornwall.

== Cast ==
- Marjorie Hume as Lady Oxborrow
- Brian Aherne as Colin O'Farrell
- Dawson Milward as Chris Furlong
- Prudence Vanbrugh as Leslie Rain
- Moore Marriott as Peter Coffin
- Albert E. Raynor as Matlock
- E.C. Matthews as Ezekiel Squence
