= The Great Adventure (play) =

1913 play

The Great Adventure is a play by Arnold Bennett. It was first produced in London in March 1913 and ran for 674 performances. A Broadway production in October 1913 ran for 52 performances. The play depicts the complications that ensue when a famous artist adopts the persona of his dead valet to escape his unwelcome celebrity.

== Background ==
Arnold Bennett, best known as a novelist, was strongly drawn to the theatre, and had written several plays between 1899 and 1912. Only one of them, Milestones, co-written with Edward Knoblock, had made any great impact, running for 612 performances from March 1912. Bennett had published a novel called Buried Alive in 1908, which he adapted for the theatre as The Great Adventure: A Play of Fancy in Four Acts. It opened at the Kingsway Theatre, London on 25 March 1913. A Broadway production opened at the Booth Theatre on 16 October 1913. The London production ran for 674 performances, closing in November 1914; the New York production ran for 52 performances, from 16 October to 6 December 1913. The play formed the basis of the 1968 musical Darling of the Day.

== Original casts ==
		London	New York
Ilam Carve	an illustrious painter	Henry Ainley	Lyn Harding
Albert Shawn	Ilam's valet	Gedge Twyman	Edward Martyn
Dr Pasco		Claude King	T. Wigney Percyval
Edward Horning	doctor's assistant	Neville Gartside	Walter Maxwell
Cyrus Carve	Ilam's cousin, a city auctioneer	Guy Rathbone	Frank Goldsmith
Father Looe	a Catholic priest	Acton Bond	Rupert Lumley
Peter Horning	a journalist	A. G. Poulton	Lionel Belmore
Ebag	a picture dealer	Clarence Derwent	Edgar Kent
John Shawn	a curate	John Astley	Erksholme Clive
James Shawn	his brother, a curate	Geoffrey Denys	Cyril Biddulph
Lord Leonard Alcar		Dawson Milward	Walter Creighton
Texel	an American millionaire	Franklyn Roberts	Edward Connelly
Janet Cannot	a widow	Wish Wynne	Janet Beecher
Mrs Albert Shawn		Alma Ellerslie	Ina Rorke
Honoria Looe	sister of Father Looe	Lydia Bilbrooke	Roxane Barton

== Plot ==
Ilam Carve is a celebrated painter, but is of a retiring personality and greatly dislikes being in the public eye. He visits England as rarely and unobtrusively as possible. On his present trip to London his valet, Albert, is taken mortally ill. A doctor is called, and assumes the dying man is Ilam. Ilam is too tongue-tied to convey to the doctor that the patient is the valet and not the painter, and finally he goes along with events, foreseeing a permanent escape from his irksome celebrity. When Albert dies, Ilam allows the body to be interred in Westminster Abbey while himself adopting the persona of the supposedly still-living Albert. Complications soon arise. Albert had been corresponding through the lonely-hearts columns with a young widow, Janet Cannot. They had not met, and she now turns up and assumes Ilam is Albert, as he is pretending to be. They are mutually attracted and by the second act they are happily married, living modestly on the annuity Ilam left Albert in his will.

Ilam cannot resist resuming painting, and sells some pictures, but when an art expert sees them he realises that they are by Carve. He acquires them and sells them to an American collector. When it emerges that the pictures are dated after the artist's supposed death, litigation looms. A further complication arises when it emerges that Albert had been married and had deserted his wife, who now turns up with her two sons – both curates – in tow, accusing Ilam of bigamy. He proves his true identity, but to spare the embarrassment of the Abbey authorities he agrees to remain officially dead and he and Janet leave for a new life abroad, as Mr and Mrs Albert Shawn.

== Revivals ==
The play was revived at the Haymarket Theatre, London on 5 June 1924, starring Leslie Faber as Ilam and Hilda Trevelyan as Janet. and ran until 18 October. A Broadway revival starring Reginald Pole as Ilam and Spring Byington as Janet ran for 45 performances in December 1926 and January 1927.

== Notes and sources ==
=== Sources ===
- Gaye, Freda, ed. (1967). Who's Who in the Theatre (fourteenth ed.). London: Sir Isaac Pitman and Sons. OCLC 5997224.
- Wearing, J. P. (1982). The London Stage, 1910–1916: A Calendar of Plays and Players. Metuchen, NJ: Scarecrow. ISBN 978-0-8108-1596-4.
