= His House in Order (1920 film) =

1920 film by Hugh Ford

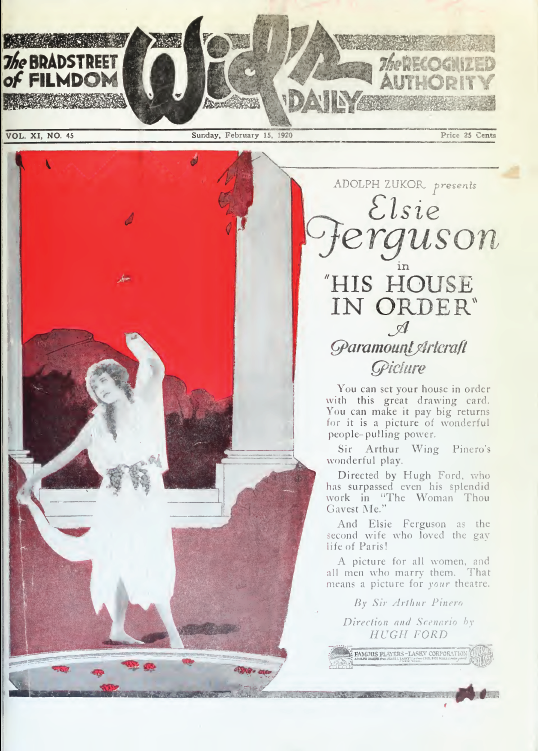
- Advertisement from Film Daily (1920)
- Directed by: Hugh Ford
- Written by: Hugh Ford (scenario)
- Based on: His House in Order by Arthur Wing Pinero
- Produced by: Adolph Zukor; Jesse L. Lasky
- Starring: Elsie Ferguson
- Cinematography: Arthur C. Miller
- Distributed by: Paramount Pictures
- Release date: March 7, 1920 (United States)
- Running time: 5 reels, 1,500 meters
- Country: United States
- Language: Silent (English intertitles)

His House in Order is a 1920 American silent drama film produced by Famous Players–Lasky and distributed by Paramount Pictures. It was directed by Hugh Ford and starred Elsie Ferguson. It is based on a 1906 West End play by Sir Arthur Wing Pinero which also played in New York where it starred John Drew and Margaret Illington. The story was filmed again in the United Kingdom in 1928 and also titled House in Order.

== Plot ==
As described in a film magazine, young impulsive Englishwoman Nina Graham, left penniless by the death of her father, takes a position as governess in the home of Filmer Jesson, M.P. Filmer's wife Annabelle is killed in an accident, and Nina learns that Annabelle had been carrying on an affair with an army officer. Later Nina and Filmer marry, but she is harassed by his constant references to his departed wife. His discovery that Annabelle was not the paragon he thought she was unnerves him and he seeks solace in the love of Nina.

== Cast ==
- Elsie Ferguson as Nina Graham
- Holmes Herbert as Filmer Jesson
- Vernon Steele as Hillary Jesson
- Margaret Linden as Annabelle Jesson
- Marie Burke as Geraldine Ridgley
- Lawrence Johnson as Derek Jesson
- William P. Carleton as undetermined role
- Forrest Robinson as undetermined
- Jane Jennings as undetermined
- Lewis Sealy as undetermined
- Regis Collins as undetermined
- Inez Borrero as undetermined

== Preservation status ==
Both the 1920 American and the 1928 British film are now considered to be lost films.

== See also ==
- Bonds of Love (1919) based on the same Pinero story
