= Percy Macquoid =

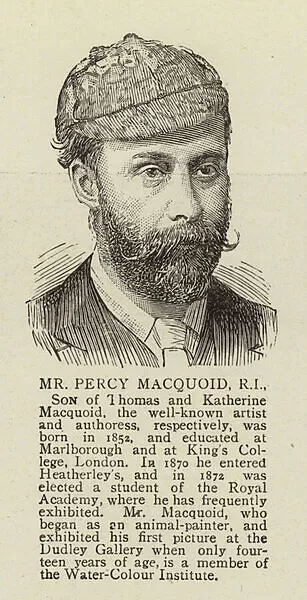
Percy Macquoid, in 1890

Percy Thomas MacQuoid RI (January 1852 – 20 March 1925) was a British theatrical designer and a collector and connoisseur of English furniture, and the author of articles, largely for Country Life, and of four books on the history of English furniture, the first major survey of the subject, which have been reprinted and are still of use today: The Age of Oak, The Age of Walnut, The Age of Mahogany and The Age of Satinwood, ending his surveys about the year 1800.

These terms, particularly the first three, have become the standard terms for referring to these different periods and styles. Despite this respect for his observations and commentary, his historical research has often been queried. He collaborated with Ralph Edwards on The Dictionary of English Furniture (three volumes, 1924–1927). Macquoid's books were published by Country Life.

== Biography ==
MacQuoid was born in Kensington, London, the son of writer Katharine Sarah Macquoid and book illustrator/watercolourist Thomas Robert Macquoid (1820–1912). He was baptised 10 January 1852. He was sent to Marlborough College, where the schoolmaster told him, "You are a hopeless duffer at Latin and Greek, but you certainly can draw. I want you to make me a drawing." He was also educated at Heatherley School of Fine Art. the Royal Academy of Arts and in France.

His early career was as an illustrator and theatrical designer, whose illustrations in The Graphic Vincent van Gogh praised to Anthon van Rappard in 1883 as "the non plus ultra of elegance and mild refined feeling".

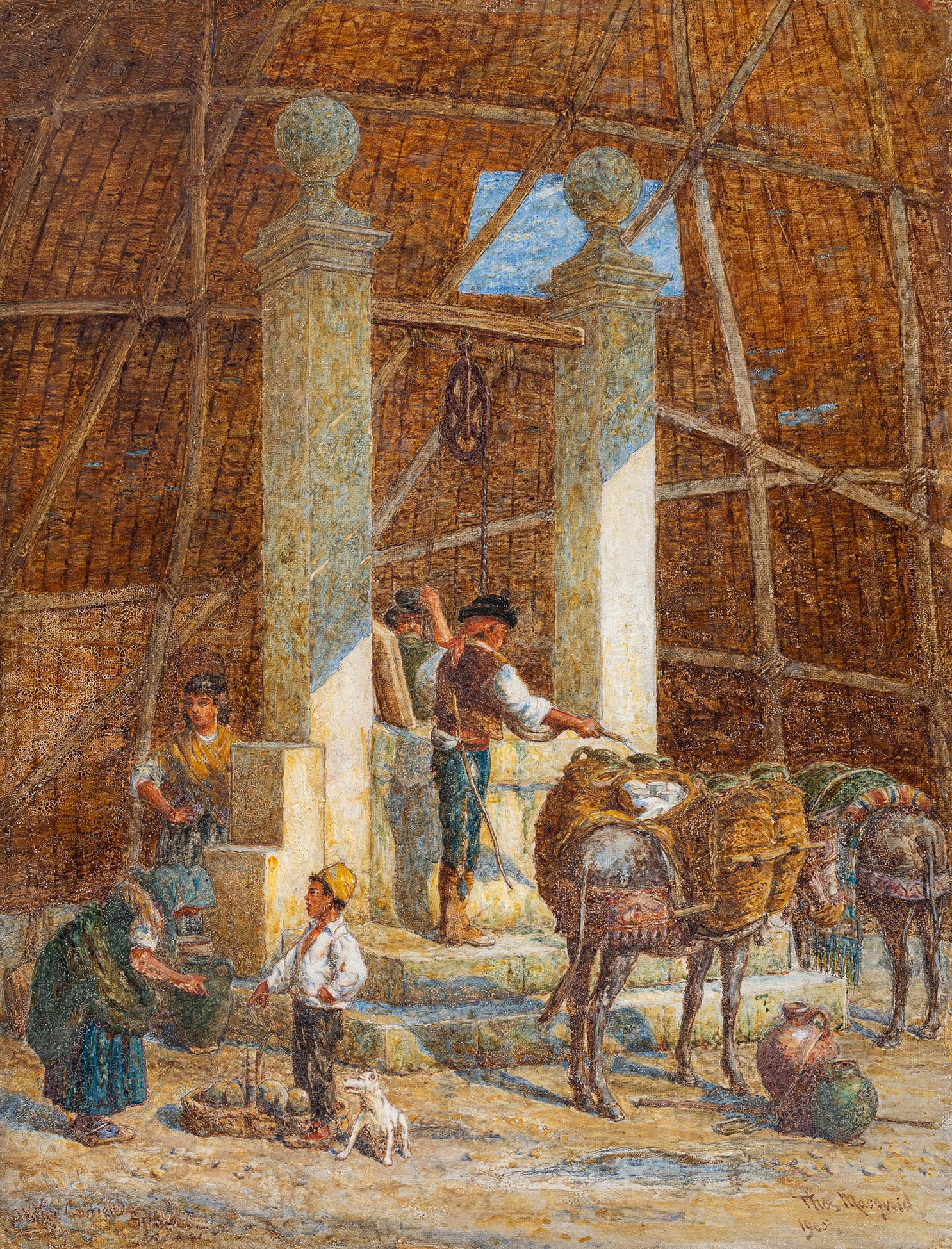
Macquoid painted A Spanish Market in 1905

Macquoid was a favoured designer of the theatrical producer Herbert Beerbohm Tree, notably for Tree's 1906 productions of Shakespeare's Anthony and Cleopatra and Nero.

In 1899, Macquoid produced decorations for the renovated St James's Theatre (demolished 1957-58) which were carried out by the leading London decorators Messrs. Morant and Co.

For the great collector Lord Leverhulme, Macquoid designed the 'Adam Room' for the Lady Lever Art Gallery, Port Sunlight, Liverpool. The work was carried out by the London decorating firm of White, Allom and installed the year of Macquoid's death. Macquoid had adapted principal elements from two documented Robert Adam houses: the plasterwork and colour of the walls derived from the Music Room at Harewood House, West Yorkshire, while the mirror above the fireplace is based on one at 20 St James Square, London.

Following his marriage in 1891 to Theresa I. Dent, the couple built The Yellow House, Bayswater, London, to designs by Ernest George and Harold Peto. The couple spent summers and autumns at Hoove Lea, overlooking the sea at Hove. In both houses there was Macquoid's collection of 17th-century and 18th-century English furniture, cared for by "a devoted and efficient staff" (Edwards 1974).

In the May 1974 issue of Apollo, Ralph Edwards recalled his collaboration with Macquoid on The Dictionary of English Furniture.

== Publications ==
- Macquoid, Percy (1904). The Age of Oak. Country Life.
- —— (1905). The Age of Walnut. Country Life.
- —— (1907). The Age of Mahogany. Lawrence & Bullen.
- —— (1908). The Age of Satinwood. Lawrence & Bullen.
- —— (1919). A History of English Furniture. Collins.
- —— (1908). The Plate Collector's Guide. John Murray.
- —— (1923). Four Hundred Years of Children's Costume from the Great Masters 1400–1800. Medici Society.
- Macquoid, Percy; Edwards, Ralph (1925–1927). Dictionary of English Furniture. Country Life.
