= His House in Order (1928 film) =

1928 film

- Directed by: Randle Ayrton
- Screenplay by: P.L. Mannock
- Based on: His House in Order by Arthur Wing Pinero
- Produced by: Meyrick Milton
- Starring: Tallulah Bankhead; Ian Hunter; David Hawthorne
- Production company: Gaumont British Picture Corporation
- Distributed by: Ideal Film Company
- Release date: 1928
- Country: United Kingdom
- Languages: Silent film English intertitles

His House in Order was a 1928 British silent drama film directed by Randle Ayrton and starring Tallulah Bankhead, Ian Hunter and David Hawthorne. It was made at Teddington Studios and based on the 1906 Broadway play His House in Order by Sir Arthur Wing Pinero. In 1920, Paramount Pictures filmed the same play, His House in Order.

The story follows a wealthy man who worships his first wife until he discovers their son is illegitimate.

== Cast ==
- Tallulah Bankhead as Nina
- Ian Hunter as Hilary Jesson
- David Hawthorne as Filmer Jesson
- Eric Maturin as Major Maurewarde
- Mary Dibley as Geraldine
- Wyndham Guise as Sir Daniel Ridgeley
- Nancy Price as Lady Ridgeley
- Claude Beerbohm as Pryce Ridgeley
- Sheila Courteney as Annabel Jesson
- Pat Courteney as Derek Jesson

== Preservation status ==
Both this version and the 1920 version are believed to be lost films.
