= Cultural depictions of Charles II of England =

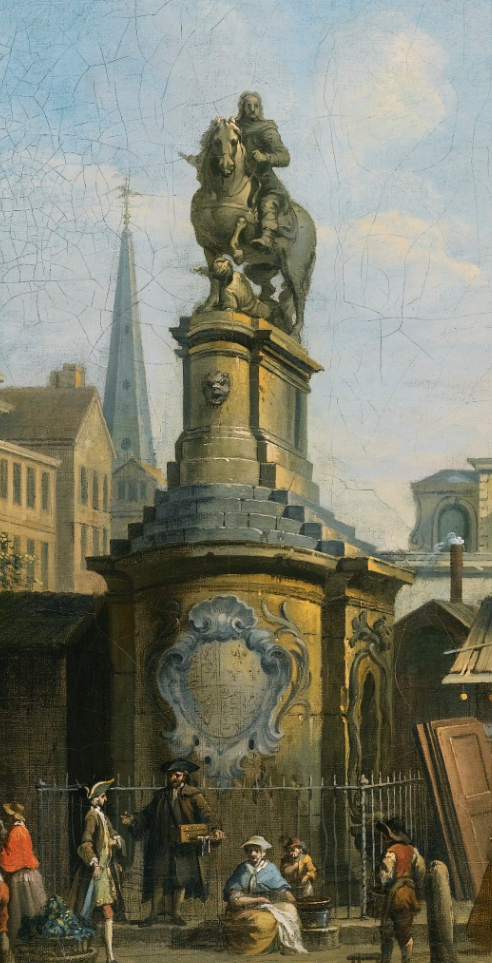
Equestrian statue of Charles II trampling Cromwell, erected 1672

Charles II of England has been portrayed many times.

== Statues ==
Sir Robert Vyner (1631–1688) supplied the regalia for the restoration of Charles II, and was appointed as the King's goldsmith in 1661. He was as much a banker as a goldsmith, and was knighted for his services in 1661 and was Lord Mayor of London in 1674. To show his devotion to the king, Vyner purchased a statue made in Italy for the Polish ambassador in London. It depicted the general, later King John Sobieski on a horse trampling a Turk.

The ambassador could not afford to pay for it and Vyner bought it and had it altered to show Charles II trampling Cromwell. How much was altered is uncertain. Cromwell's image, barely altered from the original Turk, appears to be wearing a turban. The statue reflects the Restoration perception of Cromwell. It was unveiled on 29 October 1672 at Stocks Market, Cornhill, and was removed in 1736 to make way for the construction of the Mansion House. It now stands in the grounds of Newby Hall, North Yorkshire.

The statue was the subject of two satires, attributed to Andrew Marvell: A poem of the statue in Stocks-Market and A dialogue between two horses.

Other statues include those in London's Soho Square, St Mary's Square in Gloucester, Edinburgh's Parliament Square, at the Central Criminal Court in London, at Newmarket Racecourse and near the south portal of Lichfield Cathedral.

== Literature ==
- Charles appears as Arethusius in Sir Percy Herbert's lengthy novel The Princess Cloria (1653–1661), which fictionalizes his early life up to the coronation in 1660. Mary, Princess Royal and Princess of Orange, a sister of Charles II, was depicted as "Cloria".
- Charles is the title character in John Howard Payne and Washington Irving's play Charles II (1824), a comedy which depicts the king assuming a civilian identity for fun and the consequences which ensue.
- Charles is a character in the novel The Children of the New Forest (1847) by Frederick Marryat.
- Charles appears in Alexandre Dumas's Le Vicomte de Bragelonne (1847-1850), which is a sequel of The Three Musketeers and Twenty years later; in the latter the musketeers try to save Charles I from execution; in Le Vicomte de Bragelonne, D'Artagnan and Athos help Charles II during the period of the Restoration.
- The novel Harry Ogilvie or, the Black Dragoons (1856) by James Grant, focuses on Charles's time in Scotland in 1650–1651.
- London Pride; or When the World was Younger by Mary Elizabeth Braddon (1896) focuses on Charles II's reign.
- The Tavern Knight (1904) by Rafael Sabatini, involves its Cavalier hero in the Battle of Worcester and assisting the escape of Charles II.
- Patricia at the Inn (1906) by J. C. Snaith is an adventure novel revolving around the exploits of the titular heroine as she and her husband help Charles II to escape.
- Charles appears in the 1926 novel Nell Gwyn: A Decoration (US title: Mistress Nell Gwyn) by Marjorie Bowen.
- The novel His Majesty, The King (1926) by Cosmo Hamilton focuses on Charles during his exile in the Netherlands.
- Charles appears in The Black Pearl (1982), Volume 5 of The Morland Dynasty, a series of historical novels by author Cynthia Harrod-Eagles. This volume covers the Restoration period and Charles has family links to the fictional Morland family.
- The young Charles is a character in Traitor's Field by Robert Wilton (2013), following him from the aftermath of the Battle of Worcester in 1651 to his flight into exile on the continent.
- Charles appears as a central character in two plays: George Bernard Shaw's In Good King Charles's Golden Days (1939) and Jessica Swale's Nell Gwynn (played in the premiere production in 2015 by David Sturzaker).
- Charles II is the protagonist of Georgette Heyer's historical account, published in 1938, denoted The Royal Escape, which covers the period from the defeat at Worcester to his sailing to France, from 3 September to 15 October 1651; all of it spent in hiding and journeyings. The book, with a wealth of detail and taken from actual accounts by people who helped Charles along the way, and one by the King as dictated to Pepys (who would later write on the Great Plague) is meticulously cited.

== Film ==
Charles has been portrayed on screen by:

- Augustus Neville in the silent film Sweet Nell of Old Drury (1911), based on the earlier play by Paul Kester
- P. G. Ebbutt in the silent films King Charles (1913) and Old St. Paul's (1914), based on novels by Harrison Ainsworth
- Owen Moore in the silent film Mistress Nell (1915)
- Harry Southard in the silent film The Adventurer (1920)
- William Luff in the silent film The Glorious Adventure (1922)
- Henry Victor in the silent film The Royal Oak (1923)
- Dwight Wiman in the silent film Peter Stuyvesant (1924)
- Randle Ayrton in the silent film Nell Gwyn (1926), based on a novel by Joseph Shearing
- Cedric Hardwicke in Nell Gwyn (1934)
- Allan Jeayes in Colonel Blood (1934), telling the story of Thomas Blood
- K. Hamilton Price in The Vicar of Bray (1937)
- Vincent Price in Hudson's Bay (1941)
- Dennis Arundell in Penn of Pennsylvania (1942), telling the story of William Penn
- Douglas Fairbanks Jr. in The Exile (1947), based on a novel by Cosmo Hamilton
- George Sanders in Forever Amber (1947), based on the novel by Kathleen Winsor, and The King's Thief (1955)
- Anthony Hulme in the comedy Cardboard Cavalier (1949)
- Jon Pertwee in the comedy Helter Skelter (1949)
- Lester Matthews in Lorna Doone (1951), based on the novel by R. D. Blackmore
- George Sanders, second occasion, in The King's Thief (1955)
- Gary Raymond in The Moonraker (1958)
- Gabriele Antonini in the Italian film D'Artagnan contro i tre moschettieri (1964), about the Three Musketeers
- Peter Jones in the comedy Father Came Too! (1964)
- Robin Stewart in Cromwell (1970)
- Mark Burns in The Wicked Lady (1983)
- Simon Callow in England, My England (1995), the story of the composer Henry Purcell
- Sam Neill in Restoration (1995)
- Rupert Everett in Stage Beauty (2004)
- John Malkovich in The Libertine (2004), based on the play by Stephen Jeffreys
- Charles Dance in Michiel de Ruyter (2015)

== Television ==
On television, Charles has been portrayed by:

- Barry K. Barnes in the BBC TV drama Thank You, Mr. Pepys! (1938)
- David Cargill in the BBC TV drama series The Children of the New Forest (1964)
- James Villiers in the BBC TV series The First Churchills (1969)
- Simon Treves in the BBC TV drama series By the Sword Divided (1983)
- Michael York in the British TV drama The Lady and the Highwayman (1989)
- Michael Maloney in the BBC TV drama series Children of the New Forest (1998)
- Rufus Sewell in the BBC TV miniseries Charles II: The Power and the Passion (2003)
- Nathaniel Parker in the BBC drama The Private Life of Samuel Pepys (2003)
- Julian Wadham in the BBC drama documentary Wren: The Man Who Built Britain (2004)
- Michael Boisvert in the American TV series Young Blades (2005)
- Richard Druitt in the British TV drama documentary True Caribbean Pirates (2006)
- Hal Ozsan in the HBO fantasy series True Blood (2008–2014); Nora Gainesborough is depicted as one of the mistresses of Charles II in 1665.
- Mathew Baynton, Jalaal Hartley, Paul G. Raymond and Tom Stourton in the British TV comedy series Horrible Histories (2009–present)
- Jeremy Northam in the British Channel 4 drama series New Worlds (2014)
- Jack Huston in the ITV four part episodes The Great Fire (2014)
- Daniel Lapaine in the French miniseries Versailles (2015)
