= John III Sobieski Monument =

John III Sobieski Monument may refer to:

- John III Sobieski Monument (Downtown, Warsaw)
- John III Sobieski Monument (Wilanów)
- King John III Sobieski Monument (Gdańsk)
