= The River of Stars =

The River of Stars may refer to:

- The Milky Way galaxy
- The River of Stars (novel), a 1913 novel by Edgar Wallace
- The River of Stars (film), a 1921 silent film adaptation
- An episode of Space: Above and Beyond
- River of Stars, a novel by Guy Gavriel Kay
