= The Tavern Knight =

The Tavern Knight may refer to:

- The Tavern Knight (novel), a 1904 historical adventure novel
- The Tavern Knight (film), a 1920 British silent historical film, based on the novel
