= Equestrian statue of Charles II trampling Cromwell =

Statue in Newby, Yorkshire, England

Coordinates: 54°06′06″N 1°28′01″W

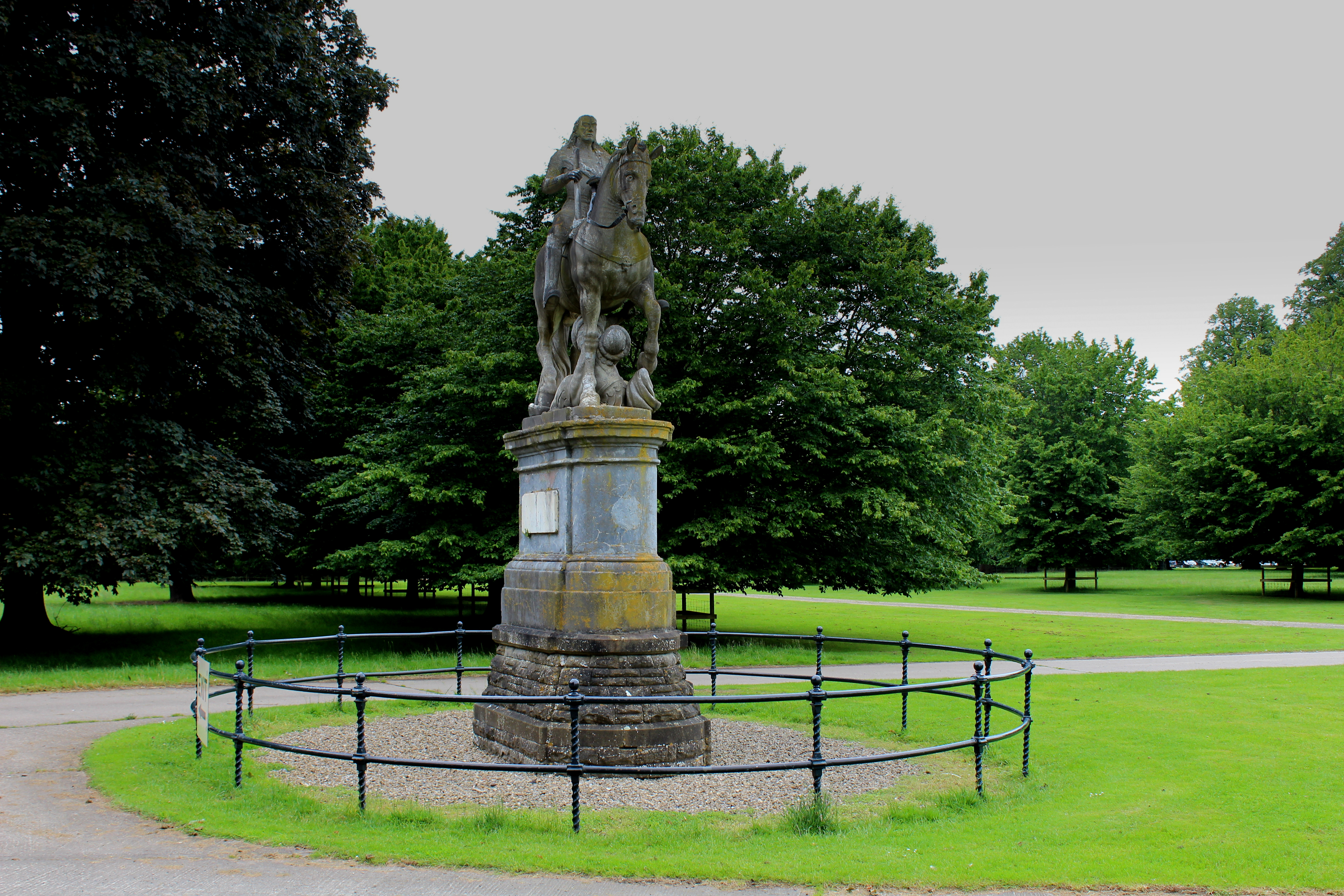
- Type: Equestrian statue
- Medium: Carrara marble
- Subject: Charles II of England
- Location: Newby Hall, North Yorkshire, England

Listed Building – Grade II
- Official name: Equestrian statue approximately 150 metres east of Newby Hall
- Designated: 6 March 1967
- Reference no.: 1289184

An equestrian statue of Charles II trampling Cromwell stands near Newby Hall in North Yorkshire, England. It was previously sited at Gautby Hall in Lincolnshire, and was originally installed at the Stocks Market in the City of London. It is a Grade II listed building.

The 17th-century statue is made of Carrara marble. It shows a man with the features of King Charles II in armour and riding a horse, which is walking over and trampling a figure lying on the ground representing Oliver Cromwell. The rider holds bronze reins in his left hand and a staff in his right hand. The sculpture stands on a tall plinth of stone ashlars, with moulded base and cornice, and rounded ends.

The original sculpture was made in Italy, but the sculptor is not known. It portrayed the Polish commander John III Sobieski riding down a Turkish soldier (said by some sources to commemorate his victory at the Battle of Vienna in 1683, although it pre-dates the battle by at least a decade). A similar sculpture was made by Franciszek Pinck to a design by André-Jean Lebrun and erected in 1788 as part of the John III Sobieski Monument (Śródmieście, Warsaw) in Łazienki Park in Warsaw, which was based on Bernini's equestrian statue of Louis XIV and a sculpture of c. 1693 in Wilanów Palace, also in Warsaw, perhaps inspired by the 1686 portrait of Sobieski by Jerzy Siemiginowski-Eleuter.

The sculpture may have been made for the King of Poland or the Polish ambassador in London, but it was bought in c. 1672 by the London goldsmith and banker Sir Robert Vyner, 1st Baronet, who was a strong supporter of Charles II, and who had made Charles's new coronation regalia to replace items sold or destroyed before or under the Commonwealth. Vyner had the head of the rider remodelled by Jasper Latham to resemble Charles. The figure interpreted as "Cromwell" retains a distinctly Turkish appearance, including a turban.

Vyner had offered in 1668 to donate a statue of Charles for the Royal Exchange when it was rebuilt after the Great Fire of London, but this offer was rejected. Vyner served as Lord Mayor of London in 1674–75, and he presented the statue to the parish of St Stephen Walbrook and had the statue installed in 1675 in the Stocks Market. This was the location of the last fixed stocks in the City of London, near Cornhill, above the outlet of a conduit fed by a lead pipe from Tyburn.

In a satirical poem, Andrew Marvell wondered whether the statue was deliberate revenge for the losses Vyner had suffered with the Stop of the Exchequer,

When each one that passes finds fault with the horse.
Yet all do affirme that the King is much worse

In another poem Marvell imagined the horse in discussion with the horse from the equestrian statue of Charles I, re-erected later the same year at Charing Cross, the two horses together comparing their riders and berating the state of the nation.

The statue was removed in 1739 to permit the construction of the Mansion House on the site of the Stocks Market, and was given back to Vyner's grandnephew, also Robert Viner. Some years later, the statue was erected at the Vyner family estate at Gautby Hall. Lady Mary Robinson, daughter of Thomas de Grey, 2nd Earl de Grey, married Henry Vyner, and after she had inherited Newby Hall in 1859 the statue was relocated there in 1883, where it remains. It received a Grade II listing in 1967.

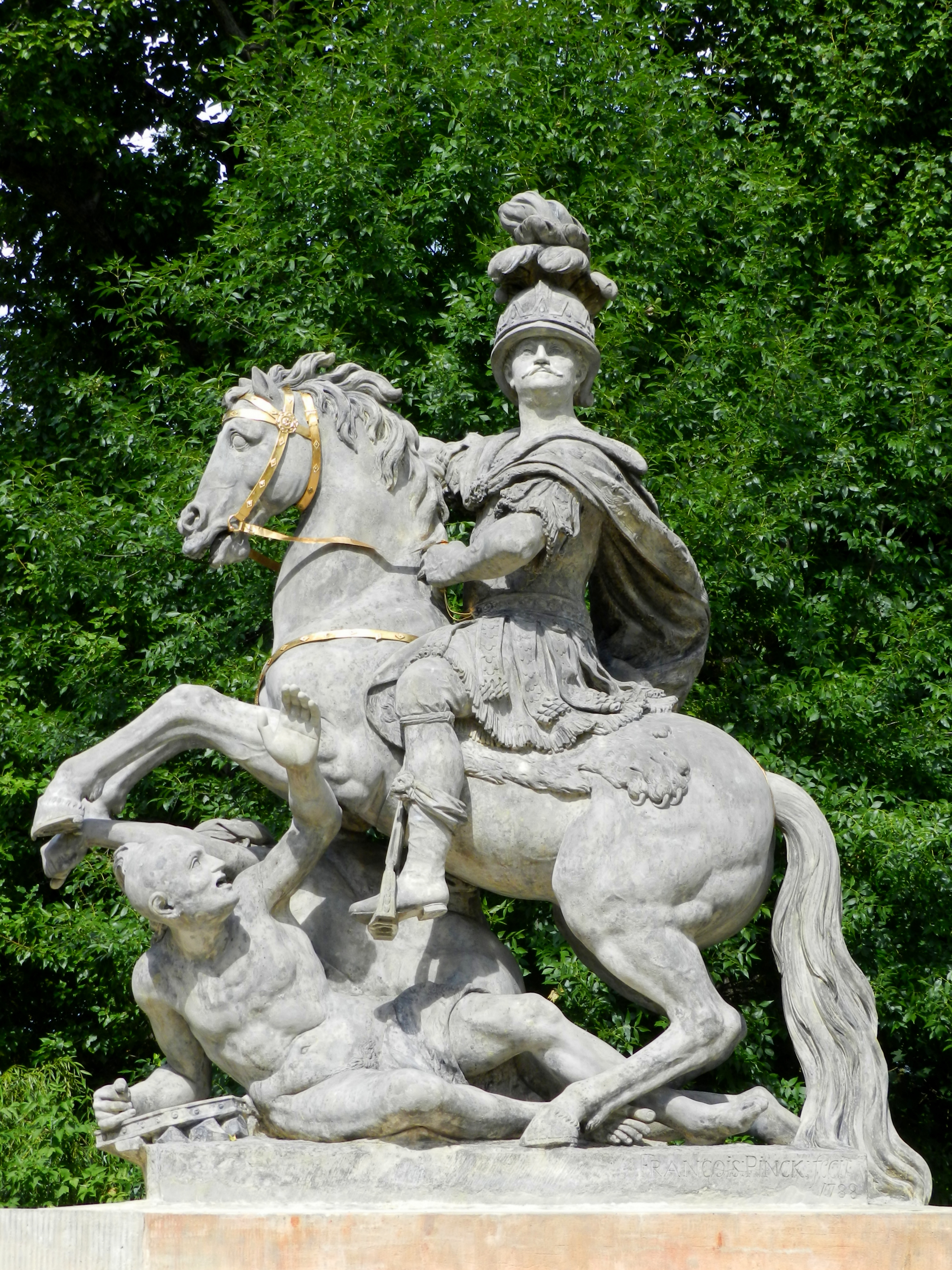
John III Sobieski Monument (Śródmieście, Warsaw) in Łazienki Park, Warsaw, 1788

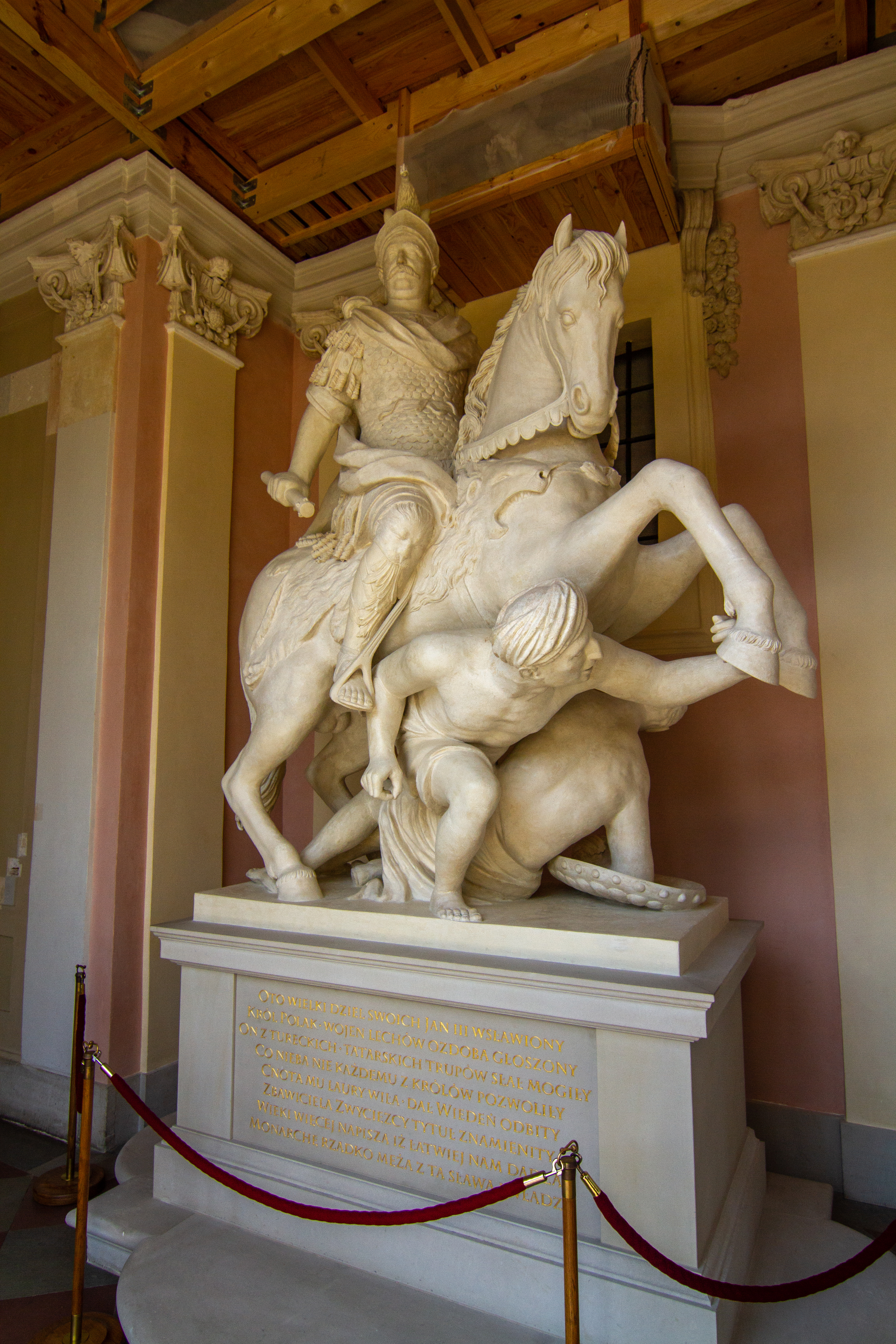
Sculpture of Sobieski in Wilanów Palace, Warsaw, c. 1693

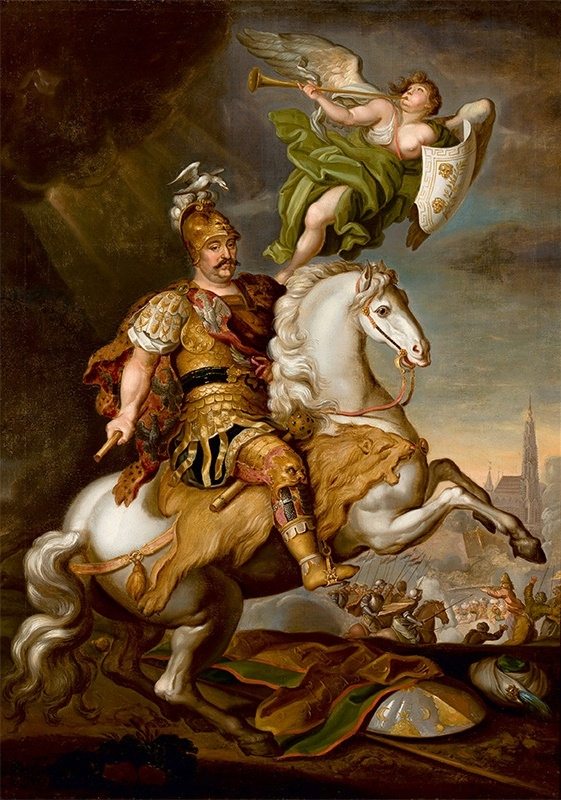
Portrait of Sobieski by Jerzy Siemiginowski-Eleuter, 1686

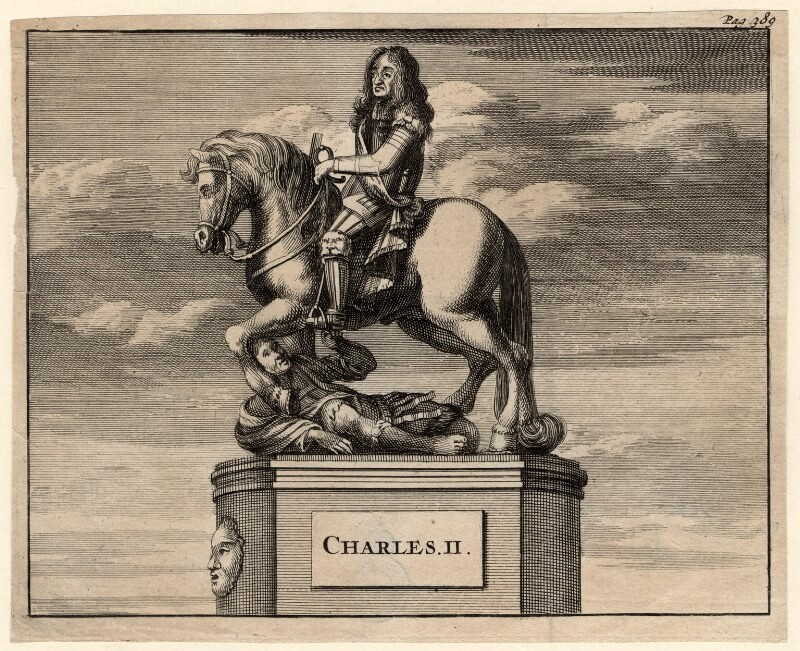
Late 17th-century engraving of the statue of Charles II at the Stocks Market, London

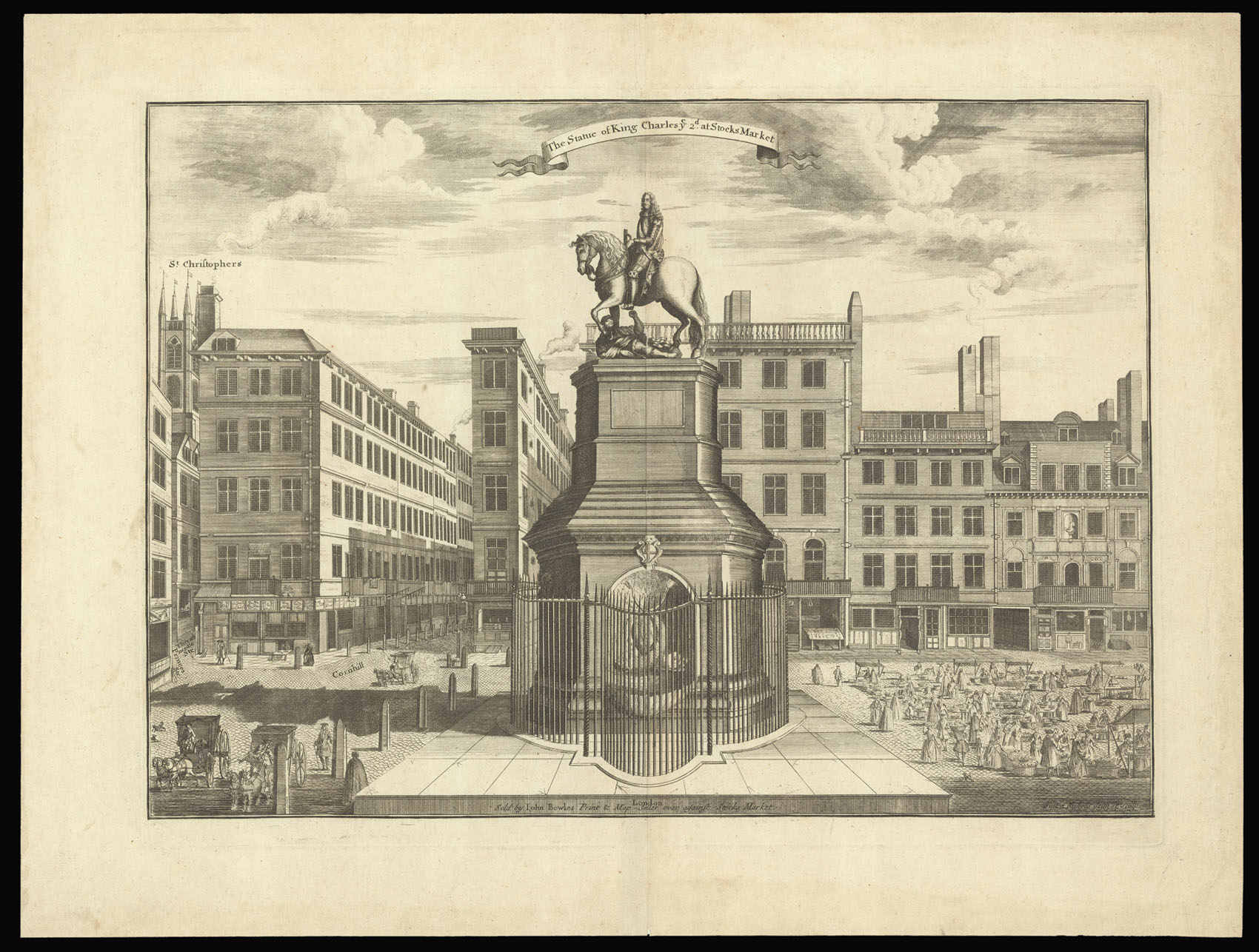
1720 engraving

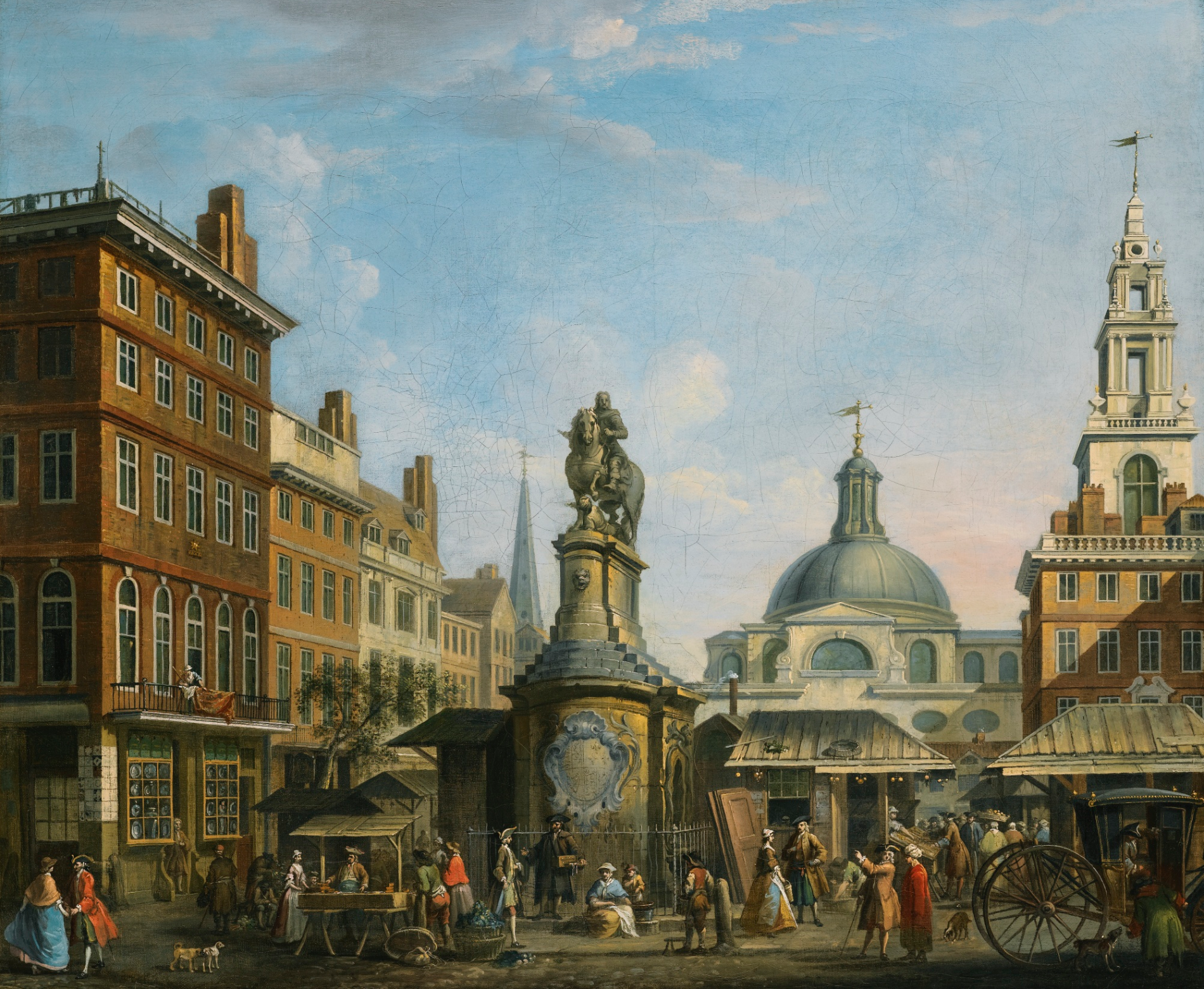
Painting of the Stocks Market, by Joseph Nickolls before 1738
