= Steinhagen i Saenger Tenement =

Tenement building in Warsaw, Poland

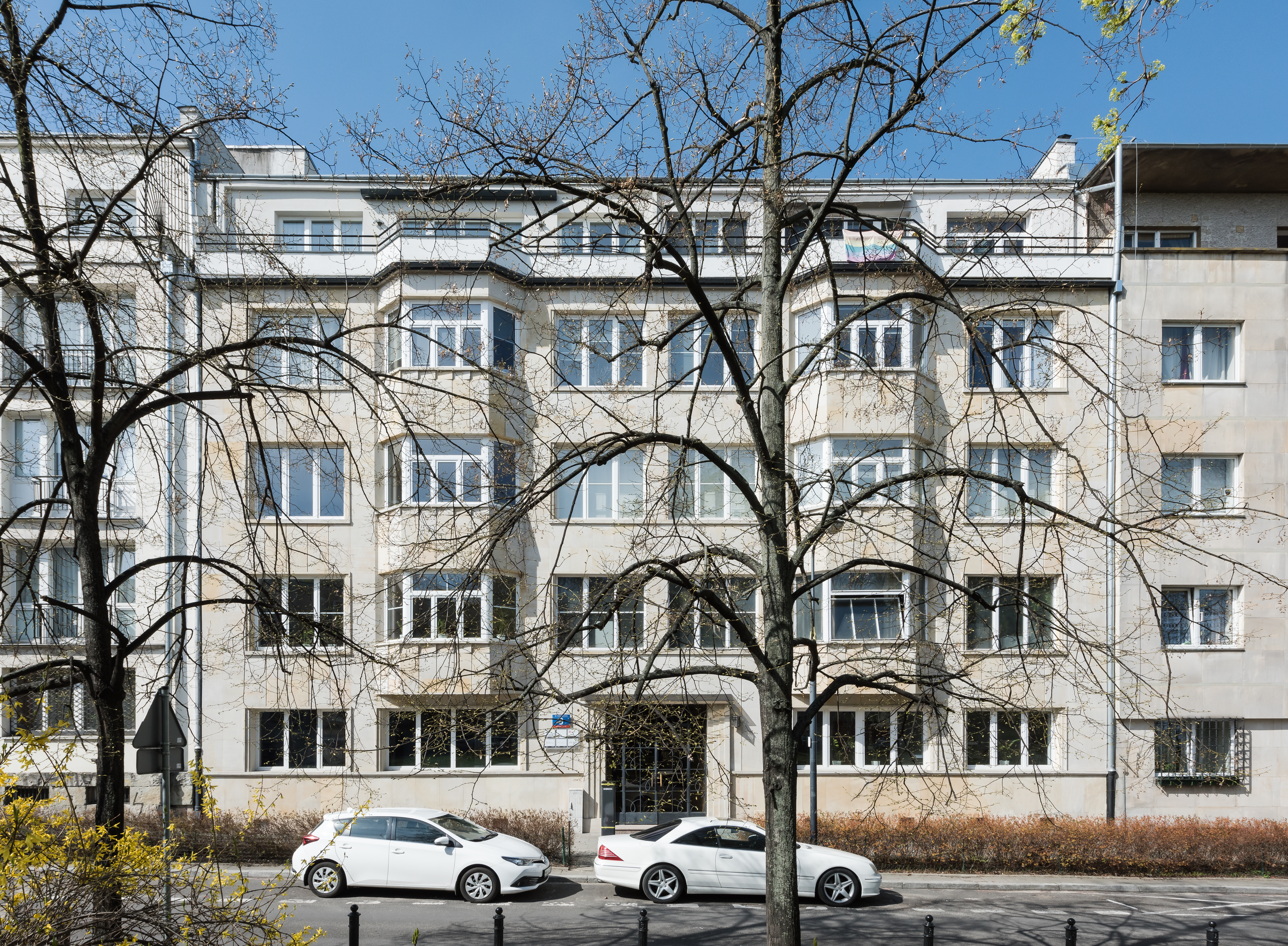
- The Steinhagen i Saenger Tenement in 2022.
- Interactive map of the Steinhagen i Saenger Tenement area

General information
- Status: Completed
- Type: Residential building
- Architectural style: International Style
- Location: Warsaw, Poland, 3 Marii Konopnickiej Street
- Coordinates: 52°13′37.76″N 21°01′33.09″E
- Construction started: 1937
- Completed: 1938

Technical details
- Floor count: 5

Design and construction
- Architects: Jerzy Gelbard; Roman Sigalin
- Architecture firm: Biuro Projektów Jerzy Gelbard i Roman Sigalin – Architekci SARP

The Steinhagen i Saenger Tenement (Note: Polish: kamienica firmy Steinhagen i Saenger) is an International Style tenement residential building, located in the city of Warsaw, Poland, at 3 Marii Konopnickiej Street. The building was built in 1938.

== History ==
The tenement was designed by architects Jerzy Gelbard and Roman Sigalin, co-owners of architecture firm Biuro Projektów Jerzy Gelbard i Roman Sigalin – Architekci SARP. It was built between 1937 and 1938. The building was originally owned by Steinhagen i Saenger, a paper and cellulose manufacturer company, owned by Robert Seanger.

== Characteristics ==
The tenement was designed in the International Style. The building has five storeys. Its elevation was covered in the tiles made from the Szydłowiec sandstone. The design of its bay windows was characteristic for that commissioned architectural firm.
