= The Four Just Men =

The Four Just Men may refer to:

- The Four Just Men (novel), a 1905 novel by Edgar Wallace, and its adaptations:
  - The Four Just Men (1921 film)
  - The Four Just Men (1939 film)
  - The Four Just Men (TV series)
