= A Question of Trust =

1920 British film by Maurice Elvey

- Directed by: Maurice Elvey
- Screenplay by: Sinclair Hill
- Based on: Ethel M. Dell's novel
- Starring: Madge Stuart; Harvey Braban; Teddy Arundell
- Release date: 1920
- Country: United Kingdom

A Question of Trust is a 1920 British silent adventure film directed by Maurice Elvey and starring Madge Stuart, Harvey Braban and Teddy Arundell. It was based on a short story by Ethel M. Dell.

== Premise ==
A young man leads a rebellion against the corrupt Governor who had his father executed.

== Cast ==
- Madge Stuart as Stephanie
- Harvey Braban as Pierre Dumaresque
- Teddy Arundell as Jouvain
- Charles Croker-King as Governor of Maritas
- Kitty Fielder as Anita.
