= Midsummer Madness (1921 film) =

1921 film by William C. deMille

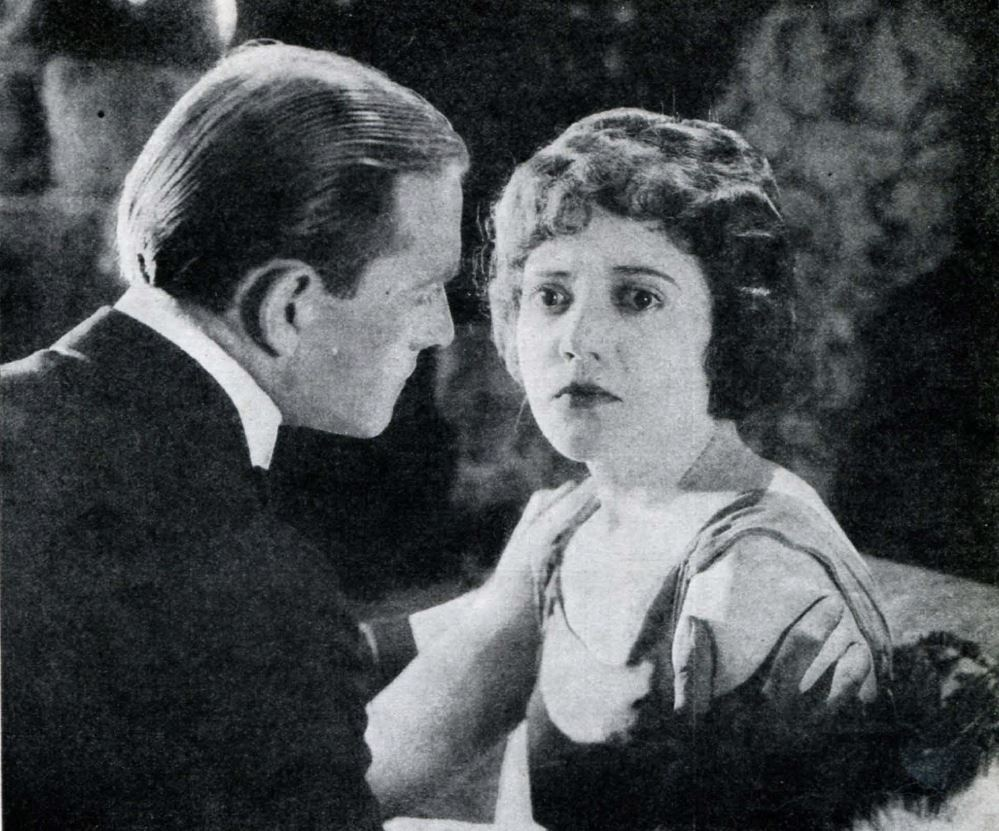
- Nagel and Wilson in a film scene
- Directed by: William C. deMille
- Written by: Olga Printzlau (scenario)
- Based on: His Friend and His Wife by Cosmo Hamilton
- Produced by: Adolph Zukor; Jesse L. Lasky; William C. deMille
- Starring: Jack Holt; Conrad Nagel; Lois Wilson; Lila Lee
- Cinematography: L. Guy Wilky
- Production company: Famous Players–Lasky Corporation
- Distributed by: Paramount Pictures
- Release date: January 23, 1921 (United States)
- Running time: 60 minutes
- Country: United States
- Language: Silent (English intertitles)

Midsummer Madness is a 1921 American silent romantic drama film produced by Famous Players–Lasky and released by Paramount Pictures. It is based on the novel His Friend and His Wife by Cosmo Hamilton.

The film was directed by William C. deMille, and stars Jack Holt, Conrad Nagel, Lois Wilson, and Lila Lee. It is the film debut of Ethel Wales. A copy of Midsummer Madness is preserved at the Library of Congress.

== Cast ==
- Jack Holt as Bob Meredith
- Conrad Nagel as Julian Osborne
- Lois Wilson as Margaret Meredith
- Lila Lee as Daisy Osborne
- Betty Francisco as Mary Miller
- Claire McDowell as Mrs. Osborne
- Peaches Jackson as Peggy Meredith
- Ethel Wales as Mrs. Hicks
- Charles Ogle as Caretaker
- Lillian Leighton as Caretaker's Wife
- George Kuwa as Japanese Servant
