= The White Angel (1936 film) =

American film depicting Florence Nightingale directed by William Dieterle

- movie poster
- Directed by: William Dieterle
- Written by: Mordaunt Shairp; Henry Wadsworth Longfellow; Michael Jacoby; Lytton Strachey
- Produced by: Henry Blanke
- Starring: Kay Francis; Ian Hunter; Donald Woods
- Cinematography: Tony Gaudio
- Edited by: Warren Low
- Music by: Heinz Roemheld
- Production company: Warner Bros. Pictures
- Distributed by: Warner Bros. Pictures
- Release date: June 25, 1936 (New York)
- Running time: 92 minutes
- Country: United States
- Language: English
- Budget: $506,000
- Box office: $1,416,000

The White Angel is a 1936 American historical drama film directed by William Dieterle and starring Kay Francis, Ian Hunter and Donald Woods. The film depicts Florence Nightingale's pioneering work in nursing during the Crimean War. It was produced and distributed by Warner Bros. Pictures.

== Plot ==
In Victorian England, Florence Nightingale decides to become a nurse, puzzling her upper-class family (as nursing was considered a disreputable profession at the time). She travels to Germany to the only nursing school. The training is arduous, but she endures and graduates. When she returns home, however, no one is willing to employ her.

When the Crimean War breaks out, she finally gets her chance. With the help of influential friends and damning newspaper reports on the wretched conditions in the Crimea by Fuller, a reporter for The Times, she is permitted to recruit some nurses and lead them to Scutari in Turkey to tend the wounded.

There, however, she is bitterly opposed by Dr. Hunt, who is in charge of the hospital. She remains undaunted, and soon wins the love of her patients. Each night, she passes through miles of the wards, carrying a lamp, so she can satisfy herself that her patients have all they need. Her tireless efforts greatly reduce the mortality rate. Her fame is spread by the newspapers, and Henry Wadsworth Longfellow writes a poem in her honor.

When the opportunity arises, she goes to the front to attend the wounded more quickly. She leaves Sister Colomba in charge at Scutari. Once more, Nightingale faces official opposition to her efforts, instigated by Dr. Hunt. However, she gains the support of Lord Raglan, the British commander in chief, and is soon hard at work. When she comes down with cholera, she is attended by Tommy, a drummer boy she herself nursed back from the brink of death.

While she is only partially recovered, she is surprised when Sister Colomba shows up. The nun informs her that Dr. Hunt replaced her with Ella Stephens, a flighty socialite Nightingale had already rejected as a nurse. Under Stephens' lax and uncaring leadership, conditions had greatly worsened. Nightingale returns to Scutari and sets things straight.

After the war ends, she returns home to England. By this time, even Dr. Hunt has reconsidered his opinion of her work, but his superior, Undersecretary of War Bullock, remains steadfast in his opposition. Bullock tries to turn Queen Victoria against Nightingale, but the monarch instead shows her approval by presenting Nightingale with a brooch.

== Cast ==
- Kay Francis as Florence Nightingale
- Ian Hunter as Fuller
- Donald Woods as Charles Cooper
- Nigel Bruce as Doctor West
- Donald Crisp as Doctor Hunt
- Henry O'Neill as Doctor Scott, a strong supporter of Nightingale
- Billy Mauch as Tommy
- Charles Croker-King as Mr. Nightingale
- Phoebe Foster as Elizabeth Herbert
- George Curzon as Sidney Herbert
- Georgia Caine as Mrs. Nightingale
- Ara Gerald as Ella Stephens
- Halliwell Hobbes as Lord Raglan
- Eily Malyon as Sister Colomba
- Montagu Love as Bullock
- Ferdinand Munier as Alexis Soyer, a cook who follows Nightingale to Scutari
- Lillian Kemble-Cooper as Parthenope "Parthe" Nightingale (as Lillian Cooper)
- Egon Brecher as Pastor Fliedner
- Tempe Pigott as Mrs. Waters
- Barbara Leonard as Minna
- Frank Conroy as Mr. Le Froy
- Alma Lloyd as nurse
- J. Gunnis Davis as Secretary
- Gardner James as Patient

== Reception ==
According to Warner Bros records the film earned $886,000 in the US and Canada and $530,000 elsewhere.

Writing for The Spectator in 1936, Graham Greene gave the film a poor review, praising Francis' acting, but concluding that "she is defeated by the scenario-writers". Greene points in particular to the graveyard scene which he describes as a "dreadful sequence".
