= John III Sobieski Memorial (Downtown, Warsaw) =

Monument in Warsaw, Poland

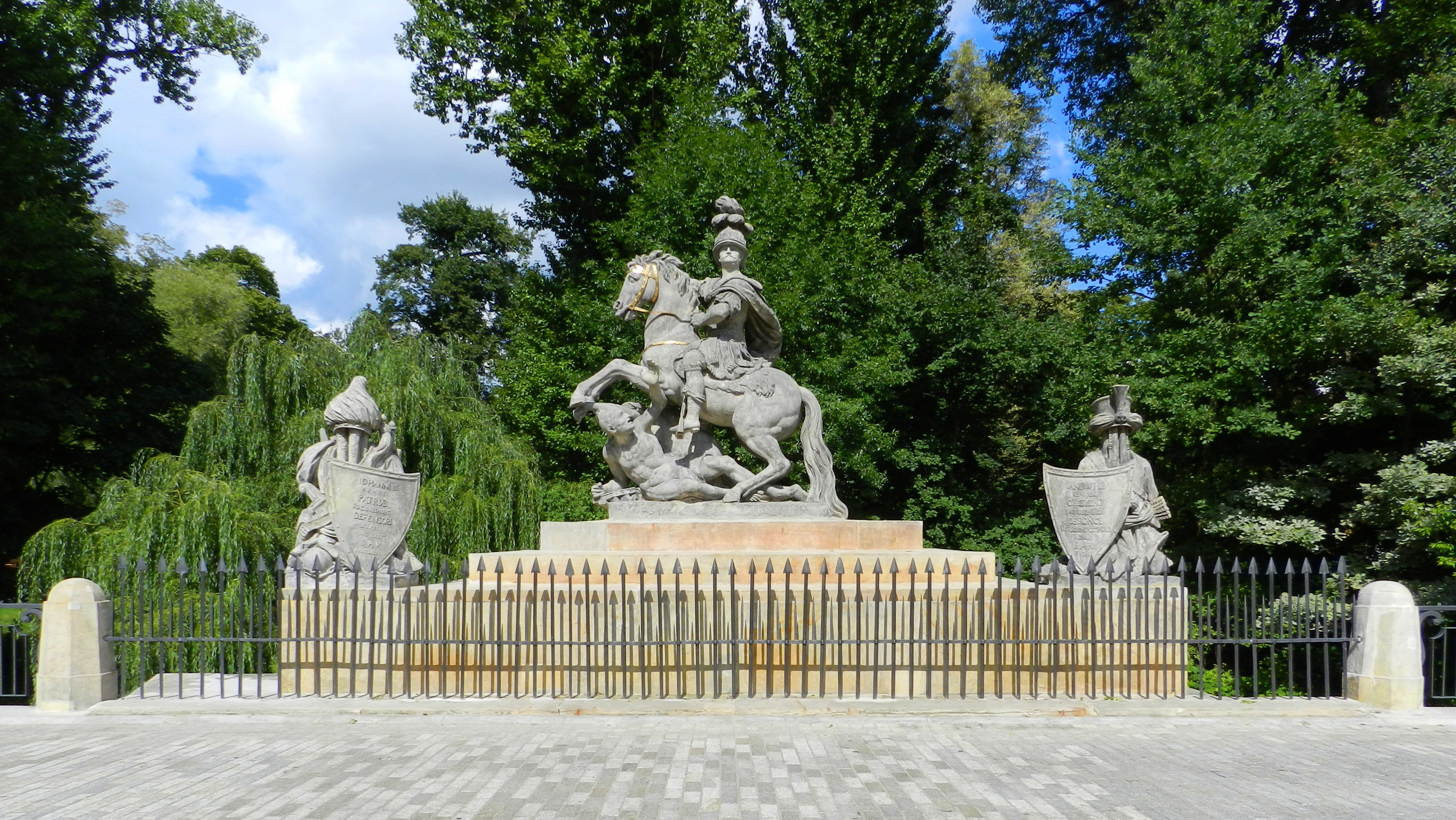
- The sculpture in 2013.
- Interactive map of John III Sobieski Memorial
- Location: Agrykola Street, Royal Baths Park, Downtown, Warsaw, Poland
- Coordinates: 52°13′02.61″N 21°02′07.48″E
- Designer: André-Jean Lebrun (designer); Franciszek Pinck (sculptor)
- Type: Equestrian statue
- Material: Sandstone
- Height: 4 m (13 ft)
- Beginning date: 1787
- Completion date: 14 September 1788
- Dedicated to: John III Sobieski

John III Sobieski Memorial (Polish: Pomnik Jana III Sobieskiego) is a sculpture in Warsaw, Poland, within the neighbourhood of Ujazdów in the Downtown district, in the Royal Baths Park. It is a sandstone equestrian statue of John III Sobieski, monarch of the Polish–Lithuanian Commonwealth from 1674 to 1696, commemorating his victory in the battle of Vienna in 1683, against the Ottoman Empire. It was designed by André-Jean Lebrun and sculptured by Franciszek Pinck, and unveiled on 14 September 1788. It is placed on the Sobieski Bridge at Agrykola Street.

== History ==
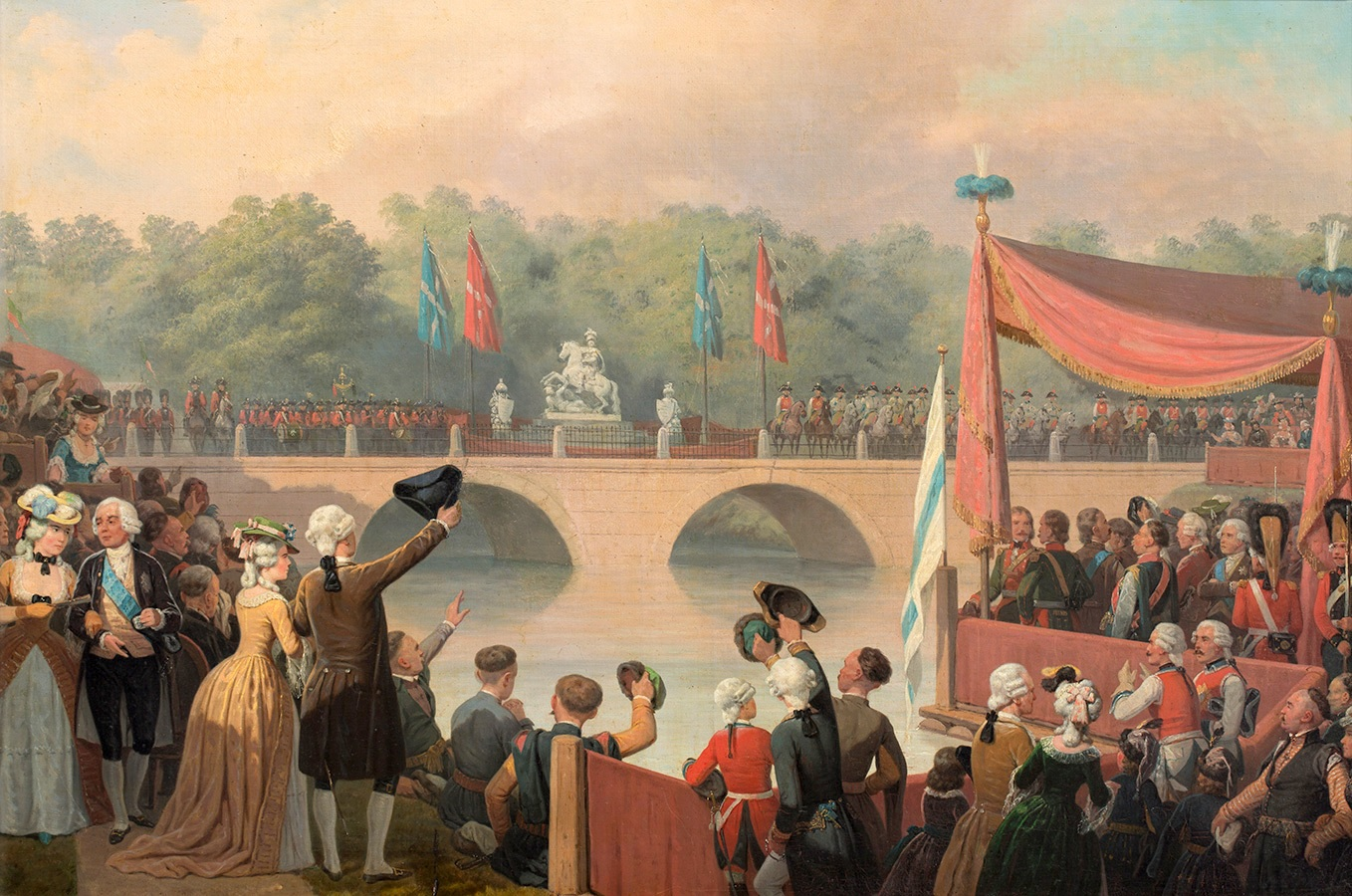
A 1869 painting by January Suchodolski, depicting the unveiling of the monument.

The monument was commissioned in September 1788 by Stanisław August Poniatowski, monarch of the Polish–Lithuanian Commonwealth, to commemorate John III Sobieski, ruler of the country from 1674 to 1696, and his victory in the battle of Vienna in 1683, against the Ottoman Empire. Poniatowski hoped that it would help ignite anti-Ottoman sentiment among the population, amidst the Russo-Turkish War, as he planned to support the Russian Empire. However it did not have the desired influence on public opinion.

The sculpture was designed by André-Jean Lebrun and sculptured by Franciszek Pinck. It was inspired by a similar statue of John III Sobieski in Wilanów Palace in Warsaw, dating to around 1663. It was carved from a large block of Szydłowiec sandstone. The monument was unveiled on 14 September 1788, in the 105th anniversary of the battle of Vienna, in a ceremony attended by around 30 thousand people. It was placed on in the Royal Baths, on the Sobieski Bridge, a stone crossing over Baths Pond, dating to 1779. It was renovated for the ceremony, with design by Domenico Merlini, which included expansion with two bridge spans, and a section with an arcade.

On the first day of the November Uprising, at night from 29 to 30 November 1830, the monument became a gathering location for insurgents, before their attack on the Royal Arsenal.

The monument survived the Second World War and underwent thorough renovations on 1947. In 1999, it was partially damaged by a vandal, who broke off a hand of an Ottoman soldier from the statue, and destroyed the texts on the shields. It was fixed following those events. It was again renovated in 2001, after the head of John III Sobieski was broken off and fell into the water canal during a storm. In 2022, a part of king's left foot broke off.

== Characteristics ==
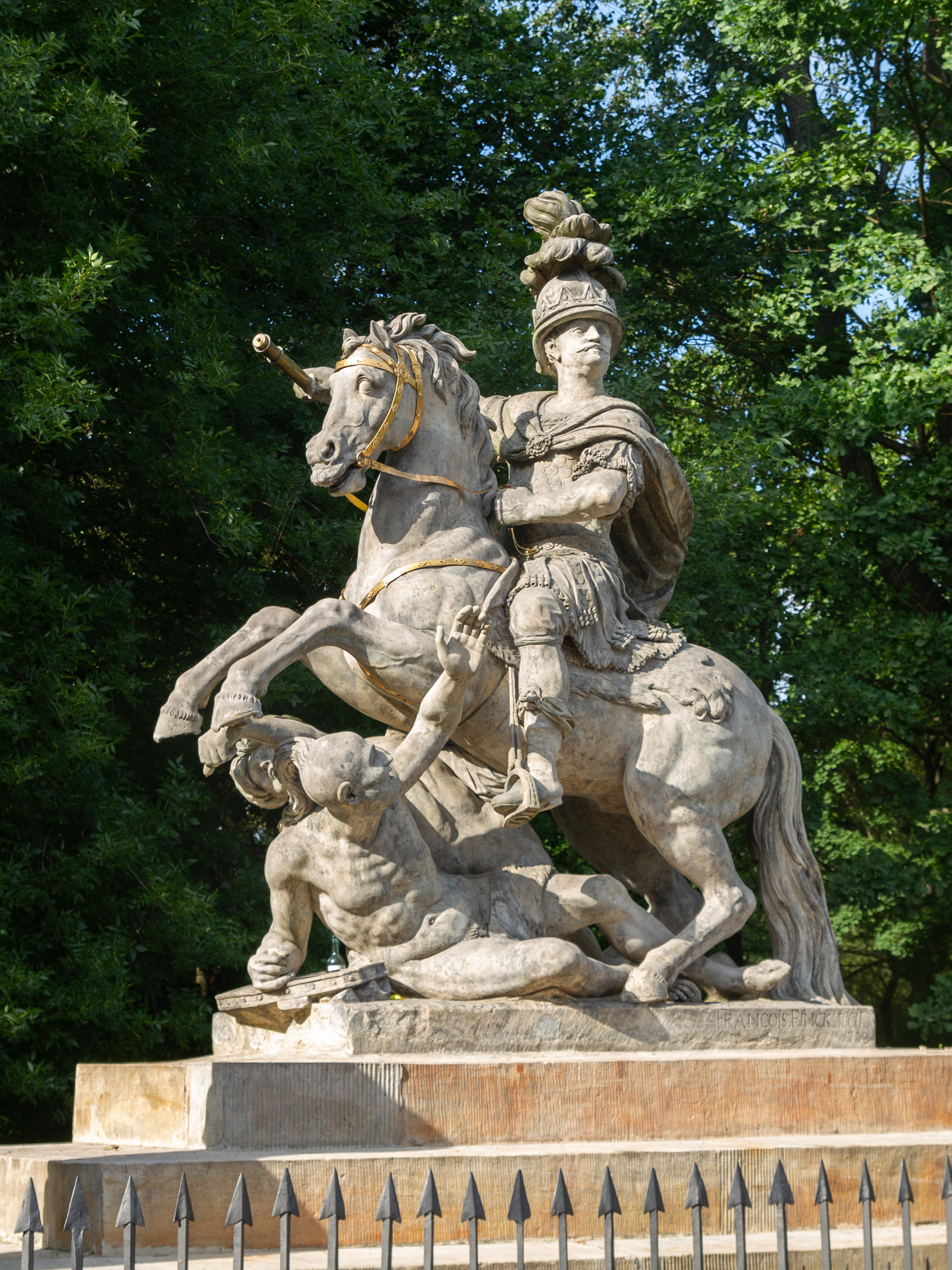
The equestrian statue of John III Sobieski.

The monument is located in the Royal Baths Park. It is placed in the middle of the Sobieski Bridge, a stone crossing over Baths Pond, which is part of Agrykola Street. It is located on the axis of the Palace on the Isle. The sculpture is made from Szydłowiec sandstone and consists of three parts. In the centre is a statue of king John III Sobieski, riding on a horse. He is wearing a knight armour and a helmet with plume, and holds a mace in his left hand. The horse is standing on its back feet, about to trample two cowering Ottoman soldiers beneath it. The statue is around 4 metres tall. To its right and left are two shields, placed on piles of Ottoman armour, weaponry, clothes, and equipment. They feature inscriptions in Polish on the right and Latin on the left.

Polish inscription
Janowi III
K.P.W.X.L [Królowi Polskiemu i Wielkiemu Xięciu Litewskiemu]
Oyczyzny y sojuszników obrońcy, któregośmy postradali r. 1696
S.A.K [Stanisław August Król]
R. 1788

Latin inscription
Iohanni III
R.P.M.D.L. [Rex Poloniae Magnus Dux Lithuaniae]
Patrie socioriimove defensori
AMDCLXXXXVI
Nobis erepto
S.A.R.
AMDCCLXXXVIII

English translation
To John III
King of Poland and Grand Duke of Lithuania
Defender of the Motherland and its allies
Whom we lost in 1696
King Stanisław August, 1788

== Gallery ==
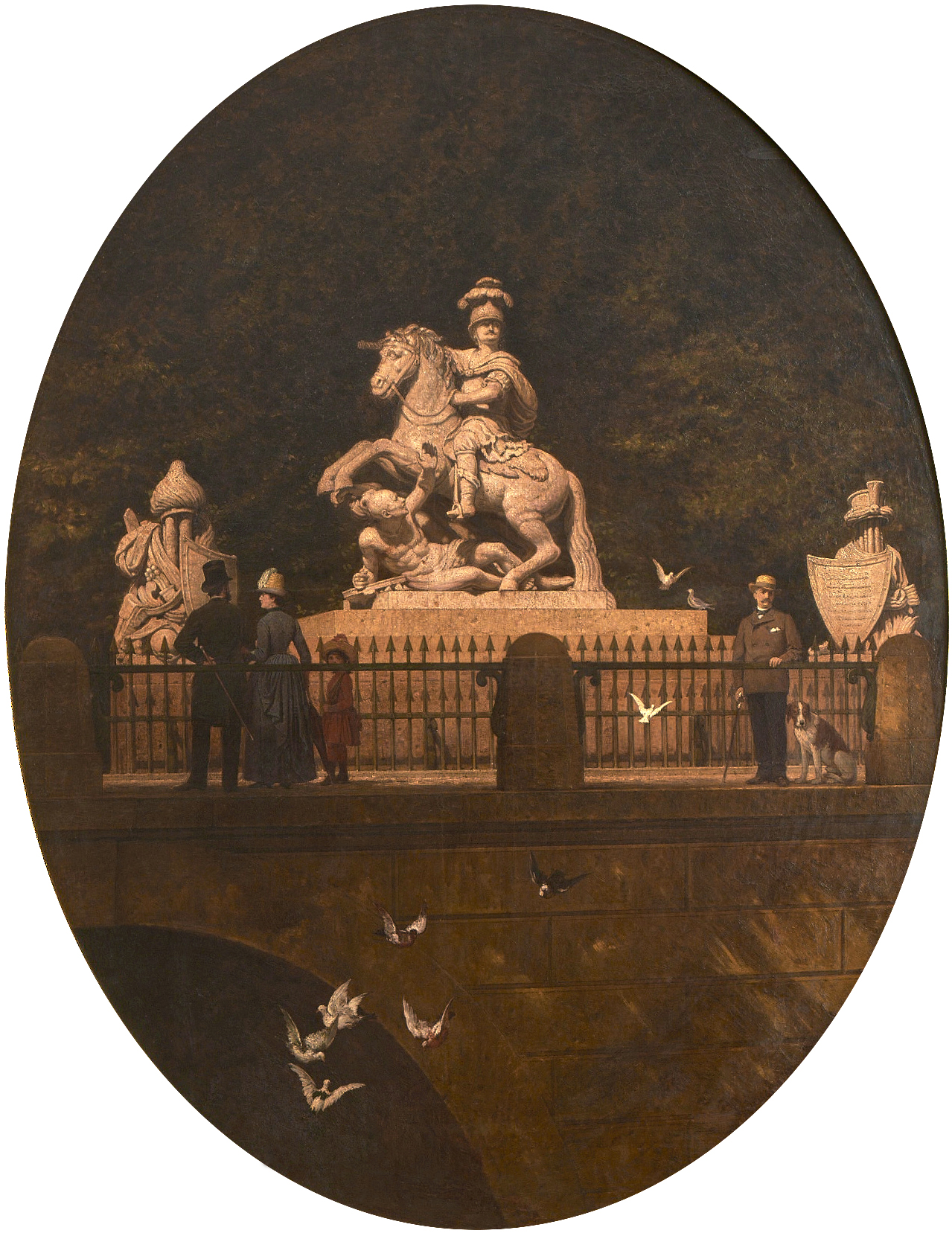
A 1888 painting by Cyprian Dylczyński depicting the sculpture

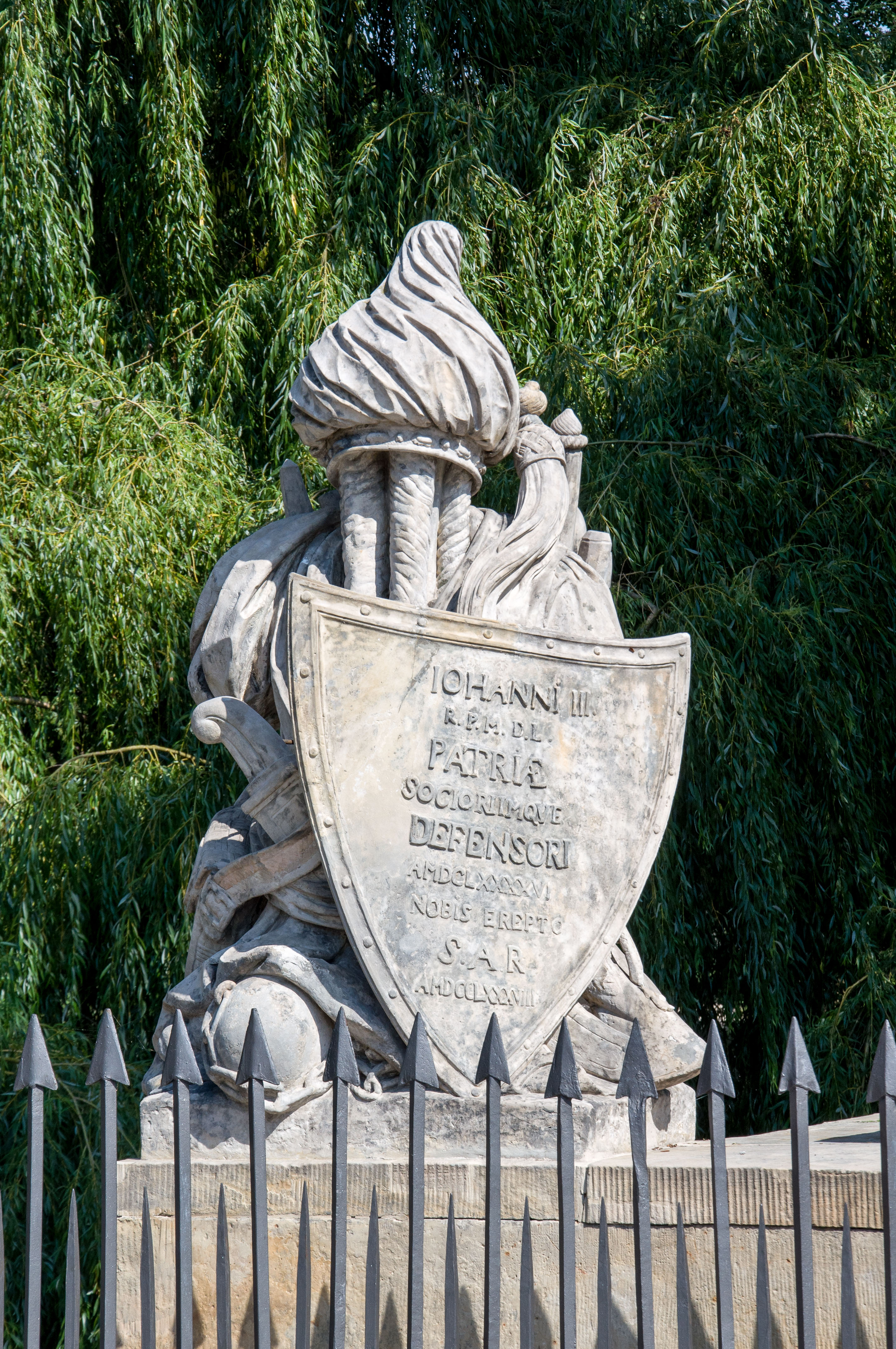
The left shield

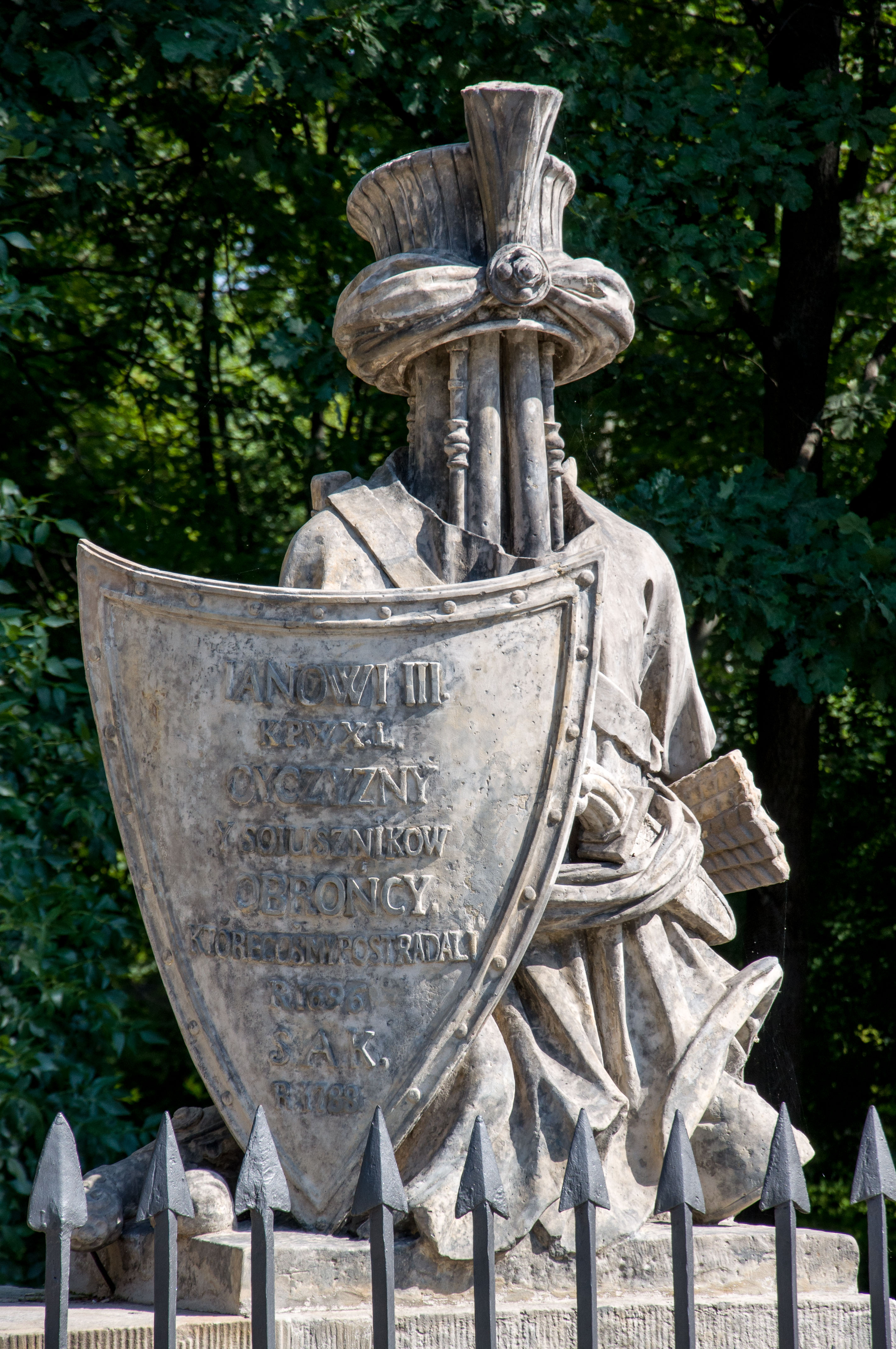
The right shield

== See also ==
- John III Sobieski Memorial (Wilanów), another sculpture in Warsaw dedicated to Sobieski
