= The Experiment (1922 film) =

1922 film

- Directed by: Sinclair Hill
- Written by: Ethel M. Dell (short story); William J. Elliott
- Starring: Evelyn Brent; Clive Brook; Norma Whalley
- Production company: Stoll Pictures
- Distributed by: Stoll Pictures
- Release date: March 1922
- Country: United Kingdom
- Language: Silent

The Experiment is a 1922 silent British drama film directed by Sinclair Hill and starring Evelyn Brent. The film is considered to be lost.

== Cast ==
- Evelyn Brent as Doris Fielding
- Clive Brook as Vivian Caryll
- Templar Powell as Maj. Maurice Brandon
- Norma Whalley as Mrs. Lockyard
- Charles Croker-King as Philip Abingdon (as C. H. Croker-King)
- Cecil Kerr as Fricker
- Laura Walker as The Nurse
- Hilda Sims as Vera Abingdon
