= The River of Stars (novel) =

1913 novel

- Author: Edgar Wallace
- Language: English
- Publication date: 1913
- Publication place: United Kingdom
- Media type: Print

The River of Stars is a 1913 novel by the British writer Edgar Wallace. It was part of a series of stories in which the character of Commissioner Sanders appears, set in British West Africa.

== Adaptation ==
In 1921 it was turned into a silent British film of the same title directed by Floyd Martin Thornton and starring Teddy Arundell. It was produced by Stoll Pictures, Britain's leading film company at the time.

== Bibliography ==
- Goble, Alan. The Complete Index to Literary Sources in Film. Walter de Gruyter, 1999.
