= Cosmo Hamilton =

English playwright and novelist (1870–1942)

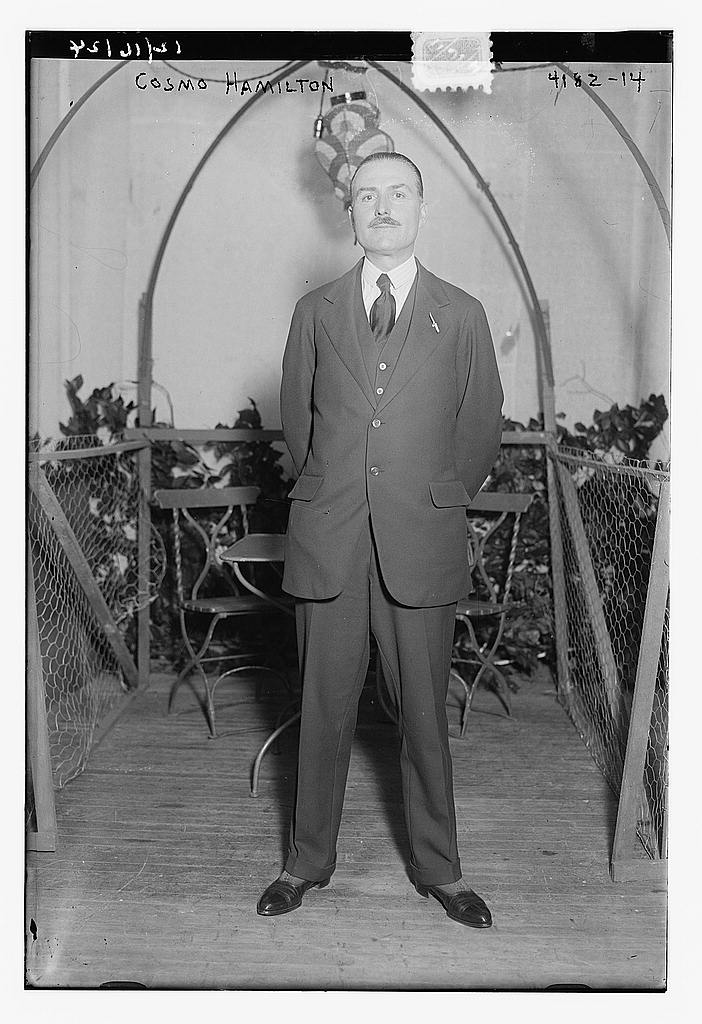
Cosmo Hamilton in 1917

Cosmo Hamilton (29 April 1870 – 14 October 1942), born Henry Charles Hamilton Gibbs, was an English playwright and novelist. He was the brother of writers Arthur Hamilton Gibbs, Francis William Hamilton Gibbs, Helen Katherine Hamilton Gibbs and Sir Philip Gibbs.

== Life and career ==
Hamilton was born in Norwood, England. He took his mother's maiden name when he began to write. Hamilton was married twice: first to Beryl Faber, née Crossley Smith, who died in 1912. (She was the sister of actor C. Aubrey Smith.) Hamilton then married Julia Bolton, the former wife of playwright Guy Bolton.

His London musicals include The Catch of the Season (1904), The Belle of Mayfair (1906), The Beauty of Bath (1906). During the First World War Hamilton was a lieutenant in the Royal Naval Air Service. He later wrote a number of Broadway shows and many screenplays, and his novels were the basis for several films.

In her April 1922 theatre column, Dorothy Parker's review of Hamilton's Broadway play Danger remarked on the salacious content of his plays: "There can longer be any doubt that it was from Cosmo Hamilton that the cosmic urge derived its name. Not even his own press agent could claim for Mr. Hamilton that it was he who conceived the notion of sex, but certainly he has given most of his life to capitalizing the idea. It has often been observed that if there were no such thing as sex, everything would be a lot better off. But then we must remember before we agree with the statement that were there no such thing, Mr. Hamilton would have nothing to write about."

Hamilton died, aged 72, in Guildford, England.

== Works ==
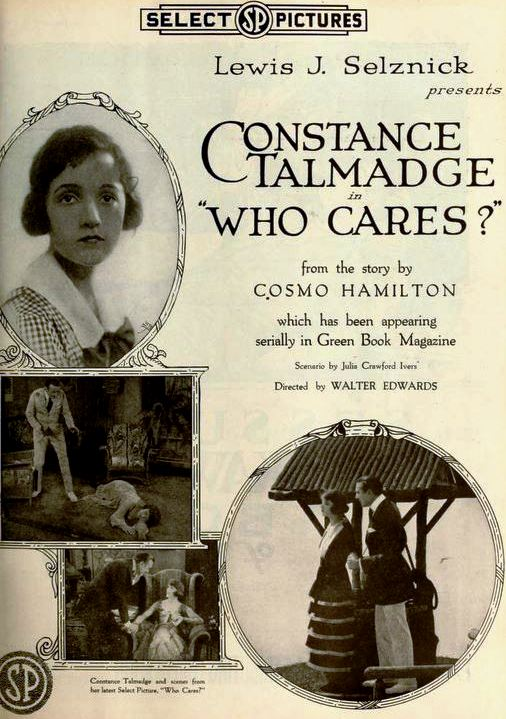
The film Who Cares? (1919) was advertised as being based upon Hamilton's novel

Hamilton wrote dozens of novels, averaging a novel per year most of his adult life. His novels include:

- Plain Brown (1909)
- A Plea for the Younger Generation (1913)
- The Door that Has No Key (1913)
- The Miracle of Love (1914)
- The Sins of the Children (1916)
- Scandal (1917)
- Two Kings and Other Romances (1917)
- Who Cares? A Story of Adolescence (1919)
- The Rustle of Silk (1922)
- Paradise (read on radio 1925)
- His Majesty, the King: A Romantic Love Chase of the Seventeenth Century (1926) (historical novel about Charles II).

Hamilton's Broadway productions include:

- The Proud Laird (1905)
- The Catch of the Season (1905)
- The Belle of Mayfair (1906-1907)
- The Hoyden (1907-1908)
- The Master Key (1909)
- The Blindness of Virtue (1912)
- Flora Bella (1916)
- The Star Gazer (1917)
- Scandal (1919-1920)
- An Exchange of Wives (1919)
- The Silver Fox (1921)
- Danger (1921-1922)
- The New Poor (1924)
- Parasites (1924-1925)
- Pickwick (1927)
- Caste (1927)

== Filmography ==
- The Blindness of Virtue, directed by Joseph Byron Totten (1915, based on the novel The Blindness of Virtue)
- Scandal, directed by Charles Giblyn (1917, based on the novel Scandal)
- The Sins of the Children, directed by John S. Lopez (1918, based on the novel The Sins of the Children)
- Day Dreams, directed by Clarence G. Badger (1919, based on a story by Cosmo Hamilton)
- Who Cares?, directed by Walter Edwards (1919, based on the novel Who Cares?)
- Restless Souls, directed by William C. Dowlan (1919, based on a story by Cosmo Hamilton)
- One Week of Life, directed by Hobart Henley (1919, based on a story by Cosmo Hamilton)
- Men, Women, and Money, directed by George Melford (1919, based on a story by Cosmo Hamilton)
- The Miracle of Love, directed by Robert Z. Leonard (1919, based on the novel The Miracle of Love)
- Eve in Exile, directed by Burton George (1919, based on the novel Eve in Exile)
- Duke's Son, directed by Franklin Dyall (UK, 1920, based on the novel Duke's Son)
- The Week-End, directed by George L. Cox (1920, based on a story by Cosmo Hamilton)
- Midsummer Madness, directed by William C. deMille (1921, based on the novel His Friend and His Wife)
- The Door That Has No Key, directed by Frank Hall Crane (UK, 1921, based on the novel The Door That Has No Key)
- The Princess of New York, directed by Donald Crisp (UK, 1921, based on the novel The Princess of New York)
- Wealth, directed by William Desmond Taylor (1921, based on a story by Cosmo Hamilton)
- Reckless Youth, directed by Ralph Ince (1922, based on a story by Cosmo Hamilton)
- The Rustle of Silk, directed by Herbert Brenon (1923, based on the novel The Rustle of Silk)
- Another Scandal, directed by Edward H. Griffith (1924, based on the novel Another Scandal)
- Who Cares, directed by David Kirkland (1925, based on the novel Who Cares?)
- Exchange of Wives, directed by Hobart Henley (1925, based on the play Exchange of Wives)
- Paradise, directed by Irvin Willat (1926, based on the novel Paradise)
- Restless Youth, directed by Christy Cabanne (1928, based on a story by Cosmo Hamilton)
- The Three Passions, directed by Rex Ingram (UK, 1928, based on the novel The Three Passions)
- The Perfect Gentleman, directed by Tim Whelan (1935, based on the story The Prodigal Father)
- The Exile, directed by Max Ophüls (1947, based on the novel His Majesty, the King)

== Other sources ==
- Twentieth Century Authors: A Biographical Dictionary of Modern Literature, edited by Stanley J. Kunitz and Howard Haycraft, New York, The H. W. Wilson Company, 1942.
