= The Crime of Dr. Forbes =

1936 film by George Marshall

- Directed by: George Marshall
- Written by: Frances Hyland; Saul Elkins
- Produced by: Sol M. Wurtzel
- Starring: Gloria Stuart; Robert Kent; Henry Armetta
- Cinematography: Ernest Palmer
- Edited by: Alex Troffey
- Music by: Samuel Kaylin
- Production company: Twentieth Century Fox
- Distributed by: Twentieth Century Fox
- Release date: July 5, 1936
- Running time: 75 minutes
- Country: United States
- Language: English

The Crime of Dr. Forbes is a 1936 American crime film directed by George Marshall and starring Gloria Stuart, Robert Kent and Henry Armetta.

The film's art direction was by Duncan Cramer.

This film was shot at 20th Century Fox Studios, Los Angeles, CA and Tombstone, Arizona.

== Plot ==
The plot was that Dr. Eric Godfrey, a New York City scientist, and his assistants were searching for a cure for spondylosis deformans in children. A miner in Arizona sent one of his assistants a bone with the same deformity that was probably from an animal in the Pleistocene Epoch, about 50,000 years ago.

Dr. Godfrey went to Arizona to look for more bones in the mine. In the meantime, Godfrey’s wife Ellen falls in love with one of her husband’s assistants, Dr. Michael Forbes.

Godfrey fell in the mine, crushed his spine, and couldn’t be moved. His assistants Dr. Forbes, Dr. Robert Empey, and Dr. Anna Burkhart arrived and eased his pain with periodic opiate injections. Godfrey knew he’d never leave the mine – it would eventually be his tomb.

One day Godfrey was pronounced dead, and Dr. Burkhart said it was murder – or a mercy killing – by Dr. Forbes. At his trial, the love between Ellen and Dr. Forbes was revealed. He had wanted to protect Ellen, but now that their love was revealed, he changed his plea to “not guilty.”

Dr. Forbes tells his defense attorney that he once gave Godfrey two extra opiate pills – but they were not enough to kill him. The defense attorney then questions Dr. Empey and Burkhart and discovers they gave Godrey extra pills as well. Godfrey had palmed the extra pills and took them all at once. The coroner testifies that the overdose was found in Godfrey’s stomach – and was not from the injections. Dr. Forbes was cleared on the verdict that Godfrey had committed suicide.

== Cast ==
- Gloria Stuart as Ellen Godfrey
- Robert Kent as Dr. Michael Forbes
- Henry Armetta as Luigi
- J. Edward Bromberg as Dr. Eric Godfrey
- Sara Haden as Dr. Anna Burkhart
- Alan Dinehart as Prosecuting Attorney
- Charles Lane as Defense Attorney
- DeWitt Jennings as Judge Benson
- Taylor Holmes as Dr. Robert Empey
- Paul Stanton as Dr. John Creighton
- Russell Simpson as Sheriff Neil
- Paul McVey as John Dunlap
- Charles Croker-King as Dean Lewis

== Bibliography ==
- James Monaco. The Encyclopedia of Film. Perigee Books, 1991.
