= Charles Croker-King =

English actor (1874–1951)

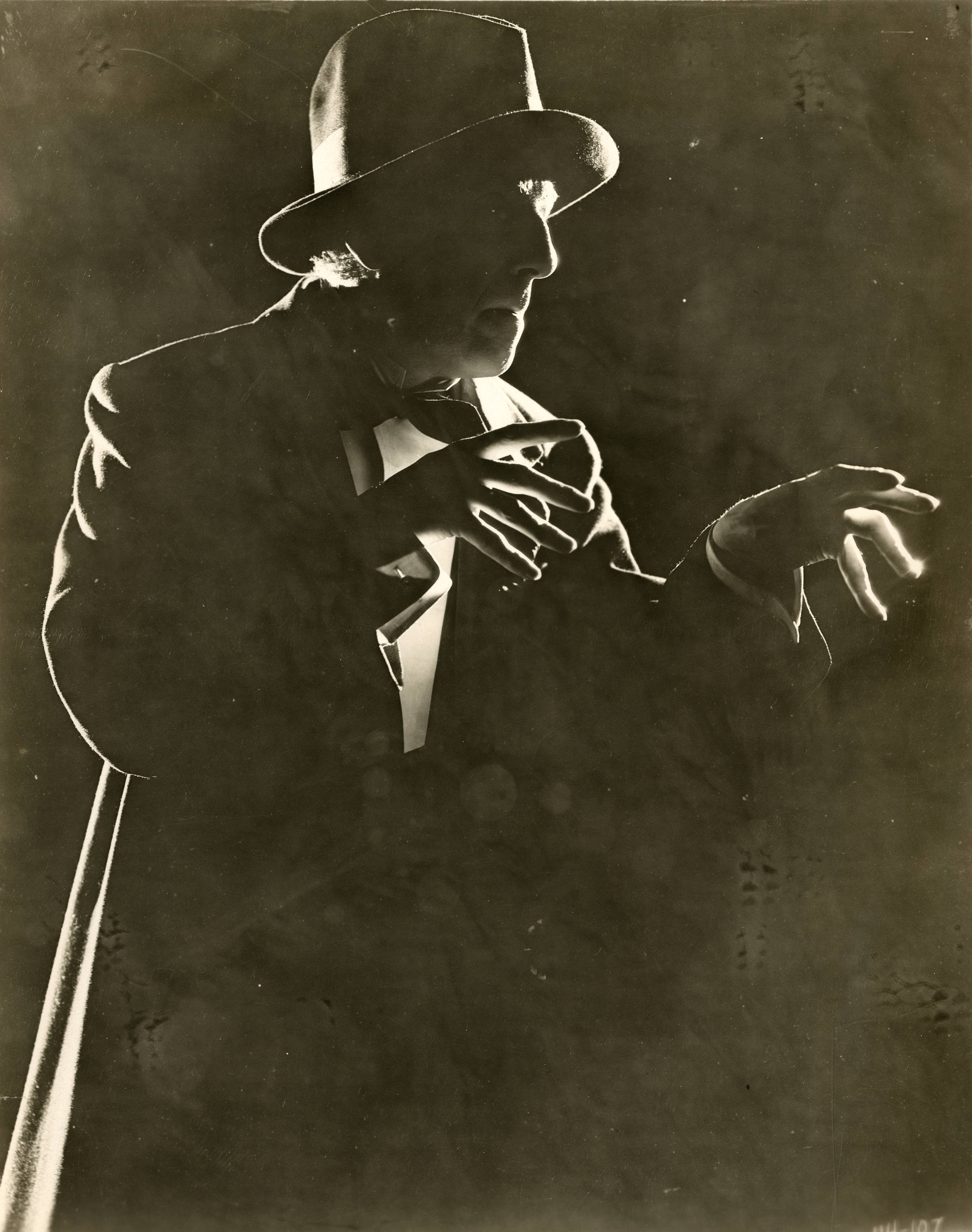
- Croker-King in 1922
- Born: Charles Harold Croker-King; 30 April 1873; Rock Helm, Yorkshire, England, U.K.
- Died: 25 October 1951 (aged 78); Dorset, England, U.K.
- Occupation: Actor
- Years active: 1920–1937

Charles Harold Croker-King (30 April 1873 – 25 October 1951) was a British stage and film actor who had a career from 1920 to 1937.

== Biography ==
Charles Croker-King was born 30 April 1873 in Rock Helm, Yorkshire, England, and died 25 October 1951 in Dorset, England.

== Filmography ==
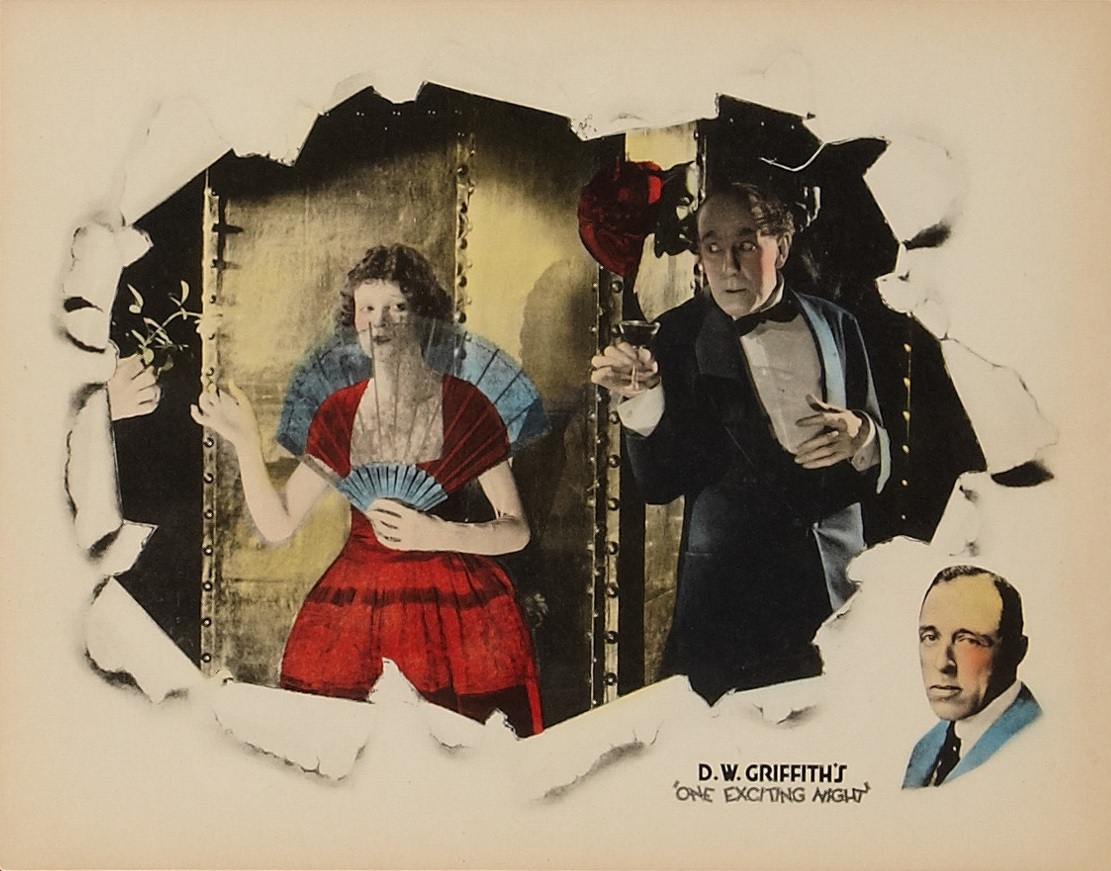
Carol Dempster and Croker-King in One Exciting Night 1922.

| Year | Title | Role | Notes |
|---|---|---|---|
| 1920 | A Question of Trust | Governor of Maritas | |
| 1920 | The Tavern Knight | Gregory Ashburn | |
| 1921 | The Priory School | Duke of Holderness | Short |
| 1921 | The Four Just Men | Thery | |
| 1922 | The Experiment | Philip Abingdon | |
| 1922 | One Exciting Night | The Neighbor | |
| 1936 | The White Angel | Mr. Nightingale | |
| 1936 | The Crime of Dr. Forbes | Dean Lewis | |
| 1936 | Stage Struck | Alexander | Uncredited |
| 1936 | Libeled Lady | Charles Archibald - Allenbury's Lawyer | Uncredited |
| 1936 | The Charge of the Light Brigade | Lord Cardigan | Uncredited |
| 1936 | Pigskin Parade | Prof. Pillsbury | Uncredited |
| 1936 | Lloyd's of London | Willoughby | |
| 1937 | 45 Fathers | Harwick | Uncredited, (final film role) |
