= The Four Just Men (1921 film) =

1921 film

- Directed by: George Ridgwell
- Written by: George Ridgwell; Edgar Wallace (novel)
- Starring: Cecil Humphreys; Teddy Arundell; Charles Croker-King; Owen Roughwood
- Cinematography: Alfred H. Moses
- Production company: Stoll Pictures
- Distributed by: Stoll Pictures
- Release date: 1921
- Country: United Kingdom
- Language: English

The Four Just Men is a 1921 British silent crime film directed by George Ridgwell and starring Cecil Humphreys, Teddy Arundell and Charles Croker-King. It was based on the 1905 novel The Four Just Men by Edgar Wallace. The film still survives unlike many other silent films of the era which are now considered lost. Its plot concerns four vigilantes who seek revenge for the public against criminals.

== Synopsis ==
A hard-headed business tycoon begins receiving threatening letters from a group who describe themselves as the "Four Just Men". Unless he mends his ways and treats his workers better, they promise to kill him. Scotland Yard are called in, but struggle to protect him from the seemingly ever-present threat.

== Production ==
It was made by Stoll Pictures, Britain's largest production company, at their Cricklewood Studios in North London. Location shooting also took place across the city.

== Cast ==
- Cecil Humphreys as Manfred
- Teddy Arundell as Inspector Falmouth
- Charles Croker-King as Thery
- Charles Tilson-Chowne as Sir Philip Ramon
- Owen Roughwood as Poiccart
- George Bellamy as Gonsalez
- Robert Vallis as Billy Marks
- Roy Wood as Sir Philip's Secretary
