= Franciszek Pinck =

Polish sculptor (1733–1798)

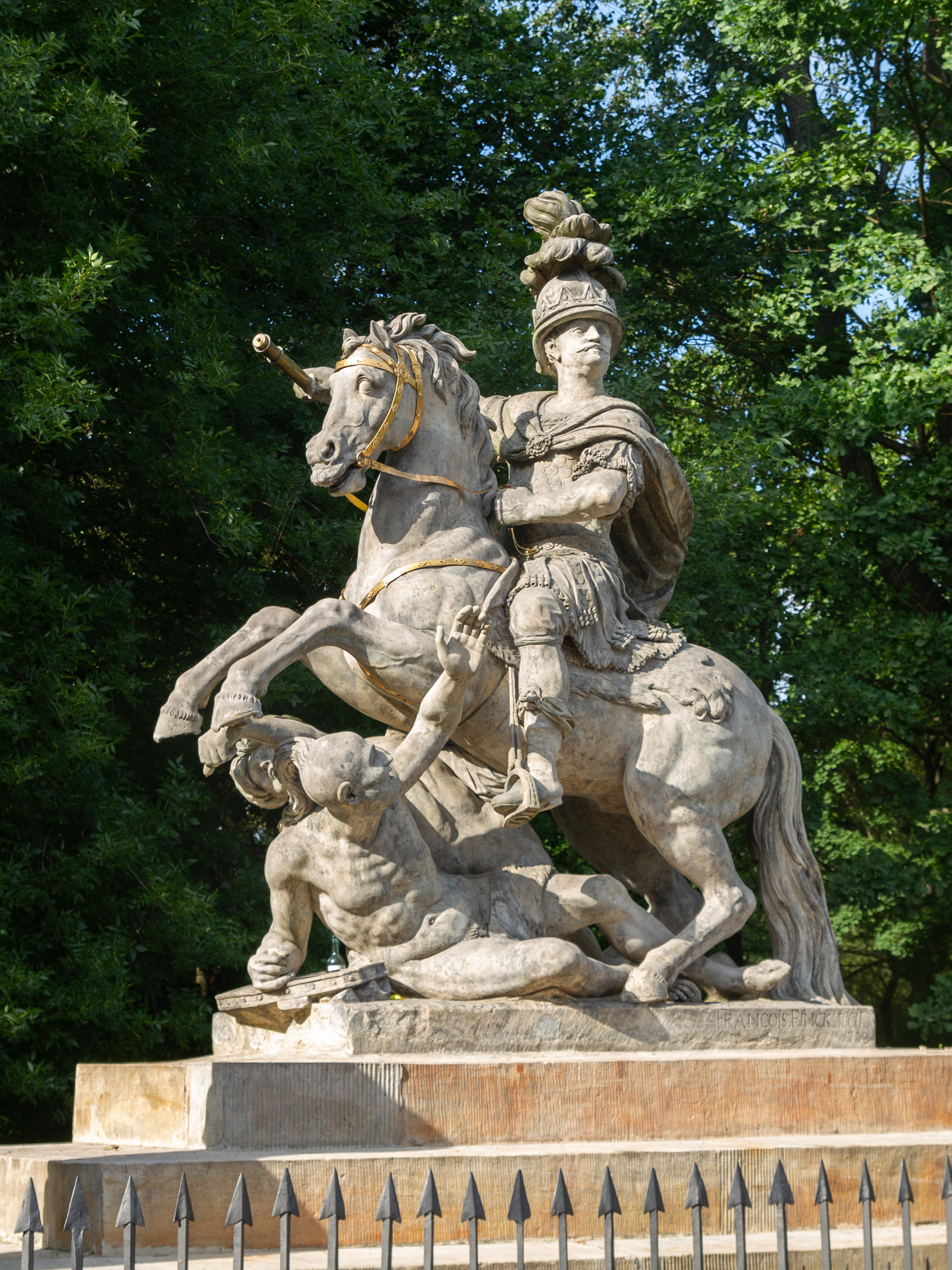
Sobieski Monument by Franciszek Pinck, Łazienki, Warsaw

Franciszek Pinck, also Pink, and Ping, Bing or Byng (Polish pronunciation: [frant͡siʂɛk pint͡sk], 1733 - 27 May 1798) was a Polish sculptor and stucco artist.

In 1765 Pinck was appointed the court sculptor for the King of Poland Stanisław August Poniatowski. The author of equestrian statue of King John III Sobieski on a bridge on the Royal Route, Warsaw, unveiled in 1788 on the occasion of 105th anniversary of the Battle of Vienna. This monument is considered the most important work of Pinck. Hammered mainly in stone, he produced busts and statues for early projects of the royal sculptor Andrzej Le Brun, adorning the royal estates of Ujazdów Castle, the Royal Castle, Warsaw, Bathrooms (garden and palace) and the palace in Kozienice.

In the 1790s sculptural work orders from the king ceased, royal cash enveloped him even with the payment of 348 ducats (his monthly salary in 1779 was 30 ducats). Pinck ran into financial trouble, sending the king several requests for payment of debts and even asking Marcello Bacciarelli for an intercession, of which Bacciarelli eventually granted him.

Pinck is the sculptor who performed many different types of work and was always in demand. He obtained as a result of the promise a payment of 900 ducats, but from then on he had to deal with finer sculptural works for private jobs. His son, Ferdinand (1761-1797), was a landscape painter. He died in Warsaw on 27 May 1798.
