= Stocks Market =

Market in London from 1282 to 1737

Coordinates: 51.513°N 0.0895°W

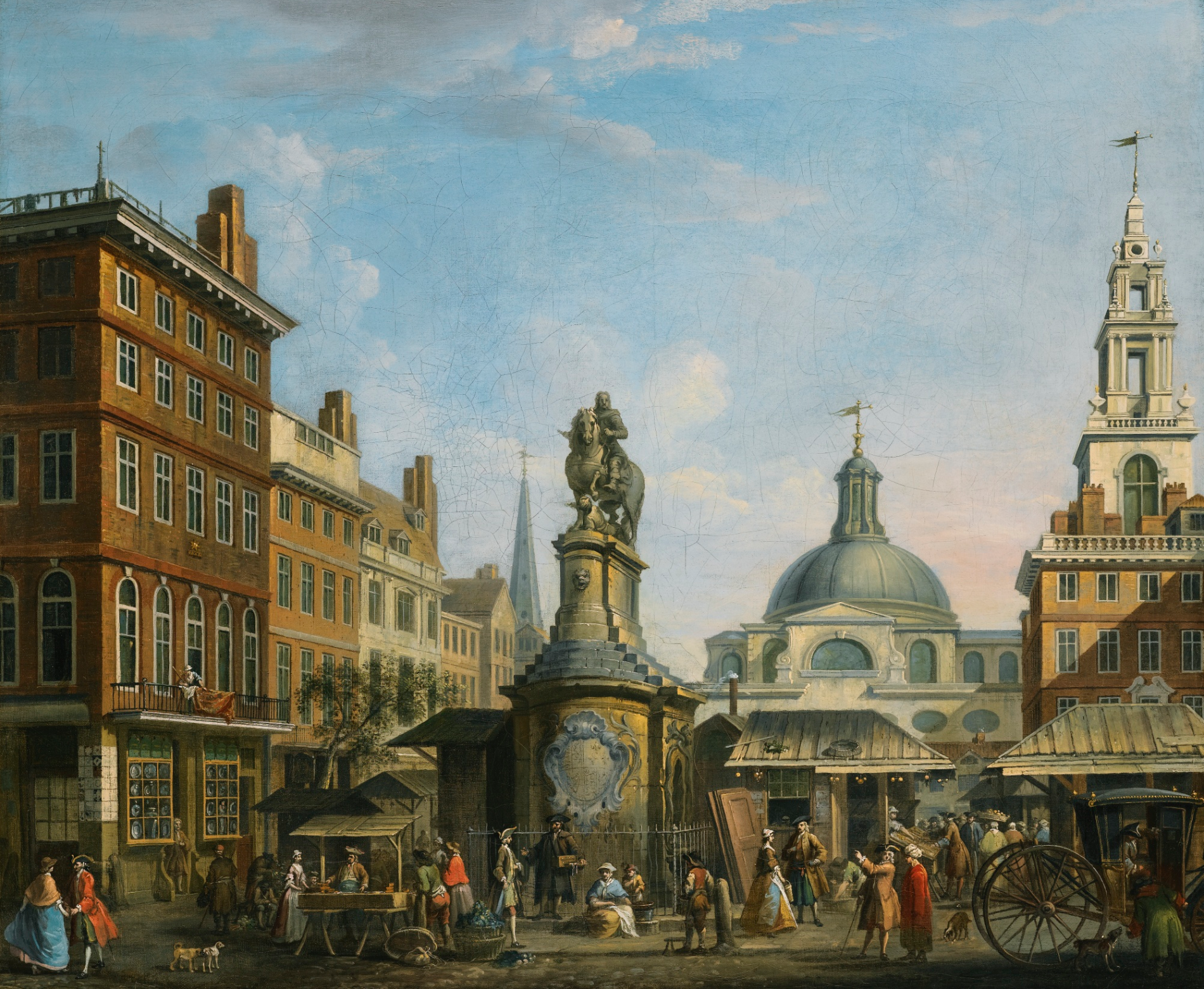
View of the Stocks Market, London, by Joseph Nickolls (1713–1755)

Stocks Market was a market in central London operating between 1282 and 1737 and for centuries was London's main retail meat and produce market.

The market was located to the east of the Walbrook in the heart of the City of London. It was demolished to make way for the building of the Mansion House on the same site.

== History ==
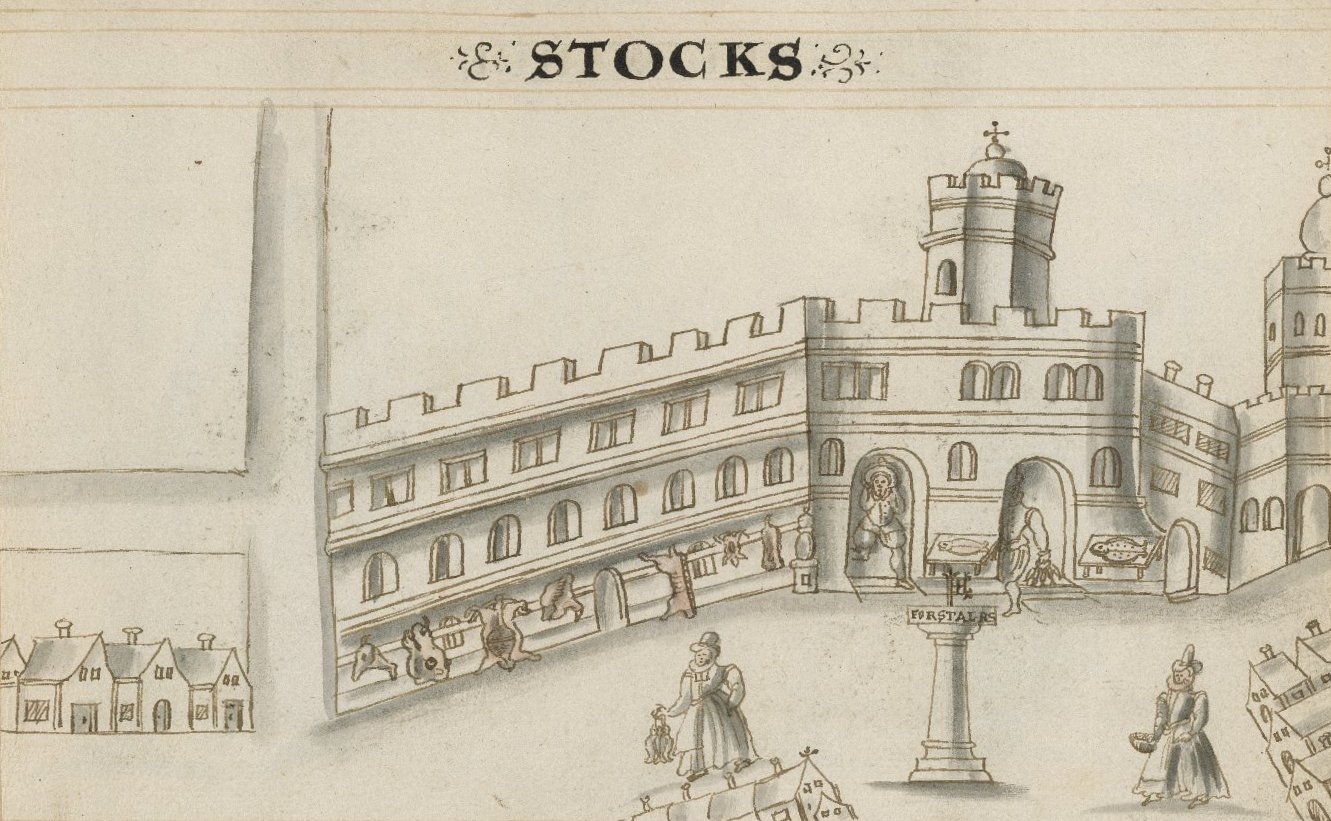
Meat and fish on sale at Stocks Market (1598)

Before the Stocks Market opened, foodstuffs were sold at stalls in Cheapside. There was concern that waste from these stalls would disrupt King Edward I's ceremonial entry into London in 1274, and the butchers' and fishmongers' stalls were moved to the site of the future Stocks Market.

Stocks Market was formally established in 1282 by Henry le Walleis, the Lord Mayor of London. It was rebuilt on the same site in 1410–1411. The market was named after "the only fixed pair of stocks in the city" which were used to punish offenders.

By 1345, Cheapside was again thronged with butchers' and fishmongers' stalls on market days, obstructing the streets. The butchers and fishmongers were required to move to Stocks Market and the poultrymen to adjoining shops or to Leadenhall Market. By 1359, Stocks Market had 71 'covered plots' in four rows for the sale of meat and fish, and 27 more in covered areas along the outer walls. The fruit and vegetable stalls had moved to an area at St Paul's Churchyard.

From 1400, the market was under the control of the Wardens of London Bridge, who let stalls to butchers and fishmongers for the term of their life. Funds raised from rents were used for the maintenance of the bridge. For centuries, Stocks Market was London's largest retail meat and produce market.

Hygiene standards are thought to have been better at Stocks Market than elsewhere, due to the availability of water and drainage from the Walbrook that ran alongside and also due to the management of the London Bridge wardens. In the fifteenth century there were public latrines in the market which were flushed with running water from the Walbrook.

By 1543, the market had 25 stalls for fishmongers, 18 stalls for butchers and 16 chambers above, rented to various traders. Poultry sellers and sellers of dairy produce congregated in the streets leading to Stocks Market, including Milk Street and Poultry. The market occupied a substantial piece of land in central London; 232 by 150 feet (71 m × 46 m), excluding waste land to the east and west sides, and the building was 25 feet (7.6 m) in height. Stocks Market was destroyed in the Great Fire of London in 1666 and then rebuilt.

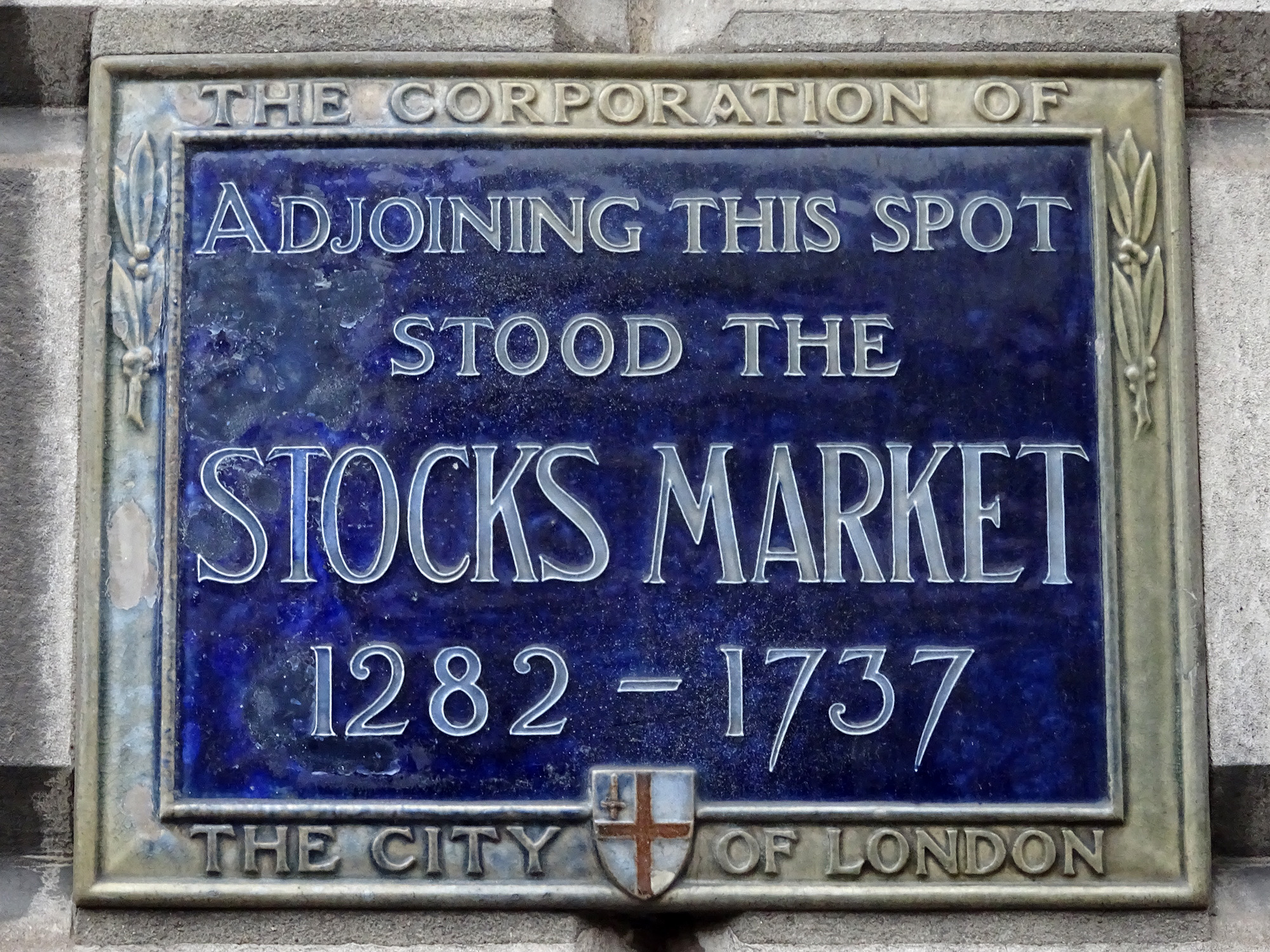
Plaque marking the site of the market

By the 1730s the area had become a prestigious location. The Bank of England and the Royal Exchange had been built nearby, and the site was chosen for the Mansion House, the official residence of the Lord Mayor of London. The Stocks Market buildings were demolished in 1737 and the market was moved to Fleet ditch and renamed the Fleet Market.

In 1829, Fleet Market was rebuilt in Farringdon Street. Following its relocation, the market changed its character; whereas Stocks Market was known as a "fish and flesh" market, its replacement primarily sold fruit, herbs and roots. The displacement of Stocks Market and its relocation to a site further away from the city centre, represented a major loss for London's working classes, who worked long hours and had little time to attend markets situated away from central London. The demise of Stocks Market marked a period of rapid decline for London's retail markets. Wholesale markets, however, continued to prosper and informal, unregulated markets sprang up to fill the gap in food distribution. The number of costermongers, hawkers and other types of itinerant street vendors increased substantially following the demise of the Stocks Market.

== Literary references ==
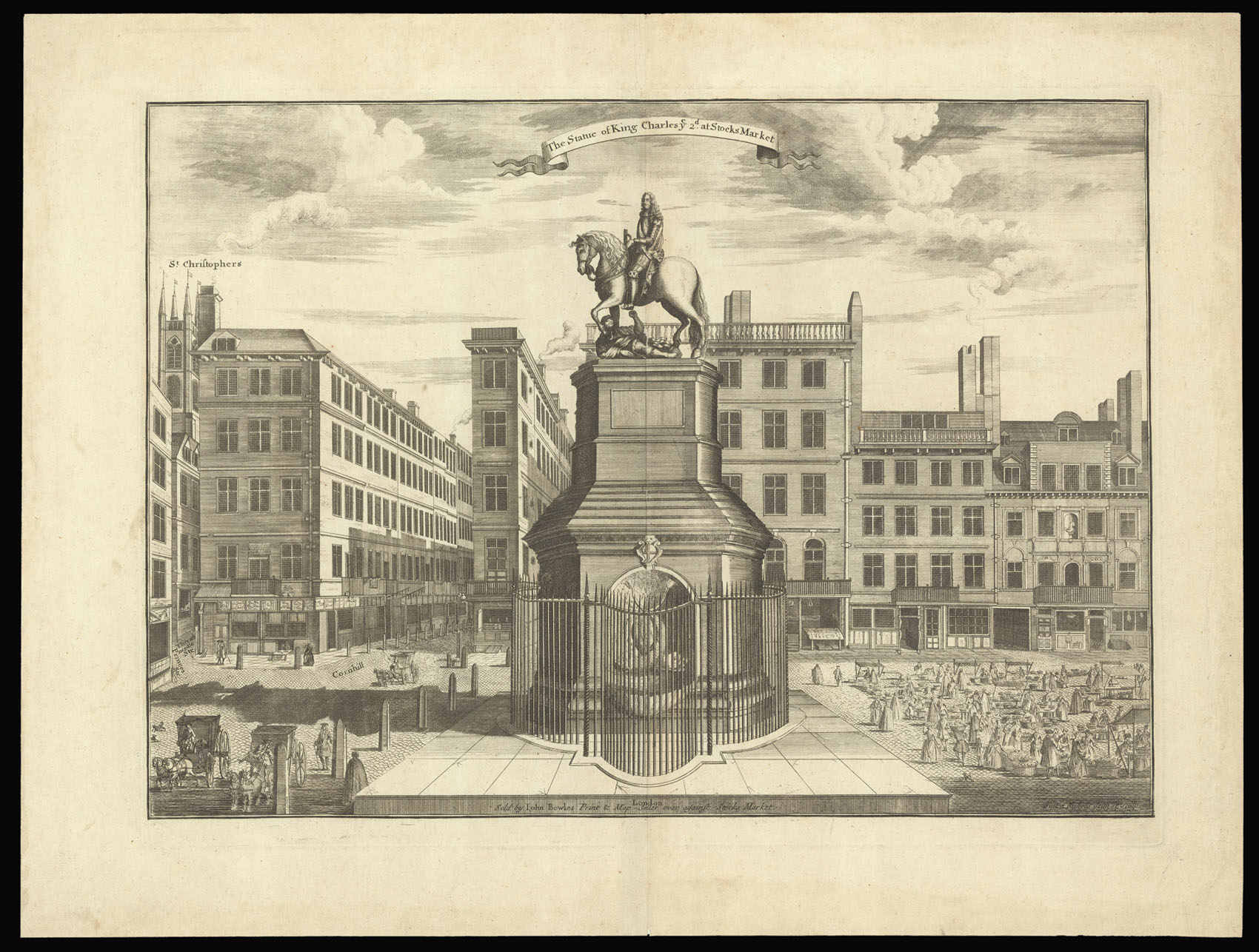
The Statue of King Charles ye 2nd at Stocks Market, engraving by Sutton Nicholls c. 1720

The diarist Samuel Pepys recorded a visit to Stocks Market.

Thence with mighty content homeward, and in my way at the Stockes did buy a couple of lobsters, and so home to dinner, where I find my wife and father had dined, and were going out to Hales’s to sit there, so Balty and I alone to dinner, and in the middle of my grace, praying for a blessing upon (these his good creatures), my mind fell upon my lobsters: upon which I cried, Odd zooks! and Balty looked upon me like a man at a losse what I meant, thinking at first that I meant only that I had said the grace after meat instead of that before meat. But then I cried, what is become of my lobsters?

— Samuel Pepys, Diary, Wednesday 13 June 1666

In 1675 an equestrian statue of King Charles II trampling on Oliver Cromwell was erected at the market. The statue was the subject of a satirical poem by Andrew Marvell (1621–1678).

But a market, as some say, doth fit the King well,
Who the Parliament too — and revenue doth sell;
And others, to make the similitude hold.
Say his Majesty too — is oft purchased and sold.

— Andrew Marvell, from "A Poem on The Statue at Stocks–Market"

== See also ==
- Marketplace
- Retail
