= The Tavern Knight (film) =

1920 film

- Directed by: Maurice Elvey
- Based on: the novel The Tavern Knight by Rafael Sabatini
- Starring: Eille Norwood; Madge Stuart; Cecil Humphreys
- Release date: 1920
- Country: United Kingdom
- Language: English (silent)

The Tavern Knight is a 1920 British silent historical film directed by Maurice Elvey and starring Eille Norwood, Madge Stuart and Cecil Humphreys. It was based on the 1904 novel The Tavern Knight by Rafael Sabatini. It is not known whether the film currently survives, and it may be a lost film.

In 1927 Warner Brothers planned a Vitaphone version of The Tavern Knight with John Barrymore but it was substituted for the Manon Lescaut story which was called When a Man Loves.

== Plot ==
As summarized in a film publication, The Tavern Knight (Norwood), known for his handling of his sword, is really Roland Marleigh, lord of Marleigh Castle. Gregory Ashburn (Croker-King) and his brother Joseph (Humphreys) long ago had caused the death of the Knight's wife and taken his young son, now known as their ward Kenneth (Anderson). Cynthia (Stuart), a niece, was also a member of the household, and the Knight believes that she loves Kenneth. The forces of Charles Stuart (Wickers) and Oliver Cromwell (Conway) are about to fight with The Tavern Knight leading the Stuart forces. Kenneth, fighting for the King, was under the Knight's leadership. When Stuart's forces retreated, the Knight and Kenneth are captured but later escape. The Knight learns that Kenneth is of the house of Marleigh, now in the possession of the Ashburns. Kenneth takes the Knight to Marleigh Castle, where the Knight reveals his identity and a sword fight begins. One of the Ashburns escapes with his life when he promises to tell the Knight news of his son. Complications follow, and the Knight kills Kenneth, which leaves the Knight free to acknowledge his love for Cynthia, who also loves him.

== Cast ==
- Eille Norwood - The Tavern Knight
- Madge Stuart - Cynthia Ashburn
- Cecil Humphreys - Joseph Ashburn
- Teddy Arundell - Captain Hogan
- Lawrence Anderson - Kenneth
- Charles Croker-King - Gregory Ashburn
- Clifford Heatherley - Colonel Pride
- Booth Conway - Oliver Cromwell
- J.E. Wickers - Charles Stuart
