= John III Sobieski Memorial (Wilanów) =

Bronze statue in Warsaw, Poland

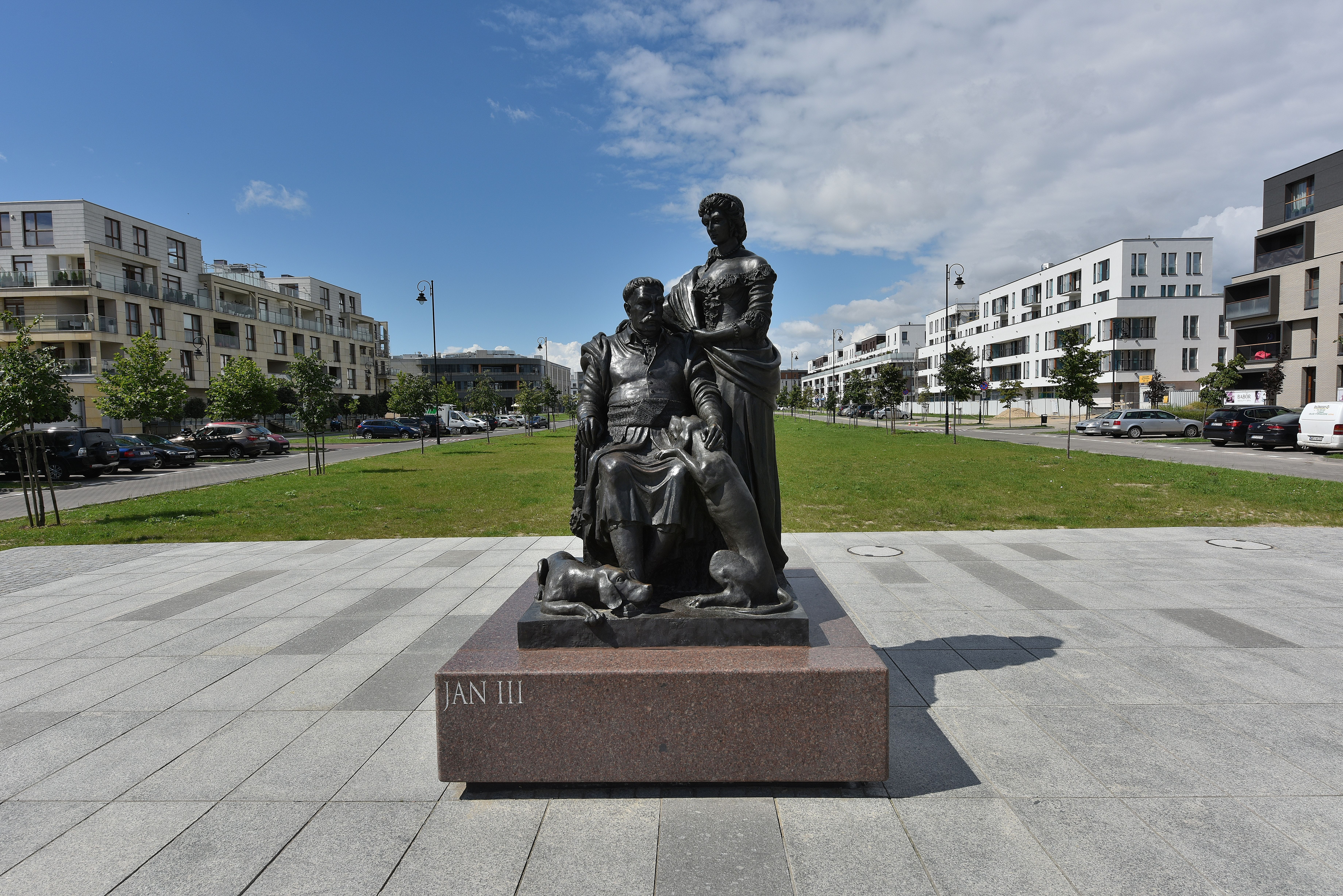
- The sculpture in 2016.
- Interactive map of John III Sobieski Memorial
- Location: Royal Axis, Wilanów, Warsaw, Poland
- Coordinates: 52.164834°N 21.074000°E
- Designer: Edward Jeliński
- Type: Statue
- Material: Bronze
- Completion date: 1999
- Opening date: 9 September 2001
- Dedicated to: John III Sobieski; Marie Casimire d'Arquien

The John III Sobieski Memorial (Polish: Pomnik Jana III Sobieskiego) is a bronze statue in Warsaw, Poland, located in the district of Wilanów, at the intersection of Royal Axis and Sarmacka Streets. It depicts king John III Sobieski, monarch of the Polish–Lithuanian Commonwealth from 1674 to 1696, together with his wife, Marie Casimire d'Arquien, and two dogs. The sculpture was made in 1999 by Edward Jeliński and unveiled on 9 September 2001. It was originally placed at the intersection of Klimczaka and Przyczółkowa Streets, and was moved to its current location in 2013.

== History ==
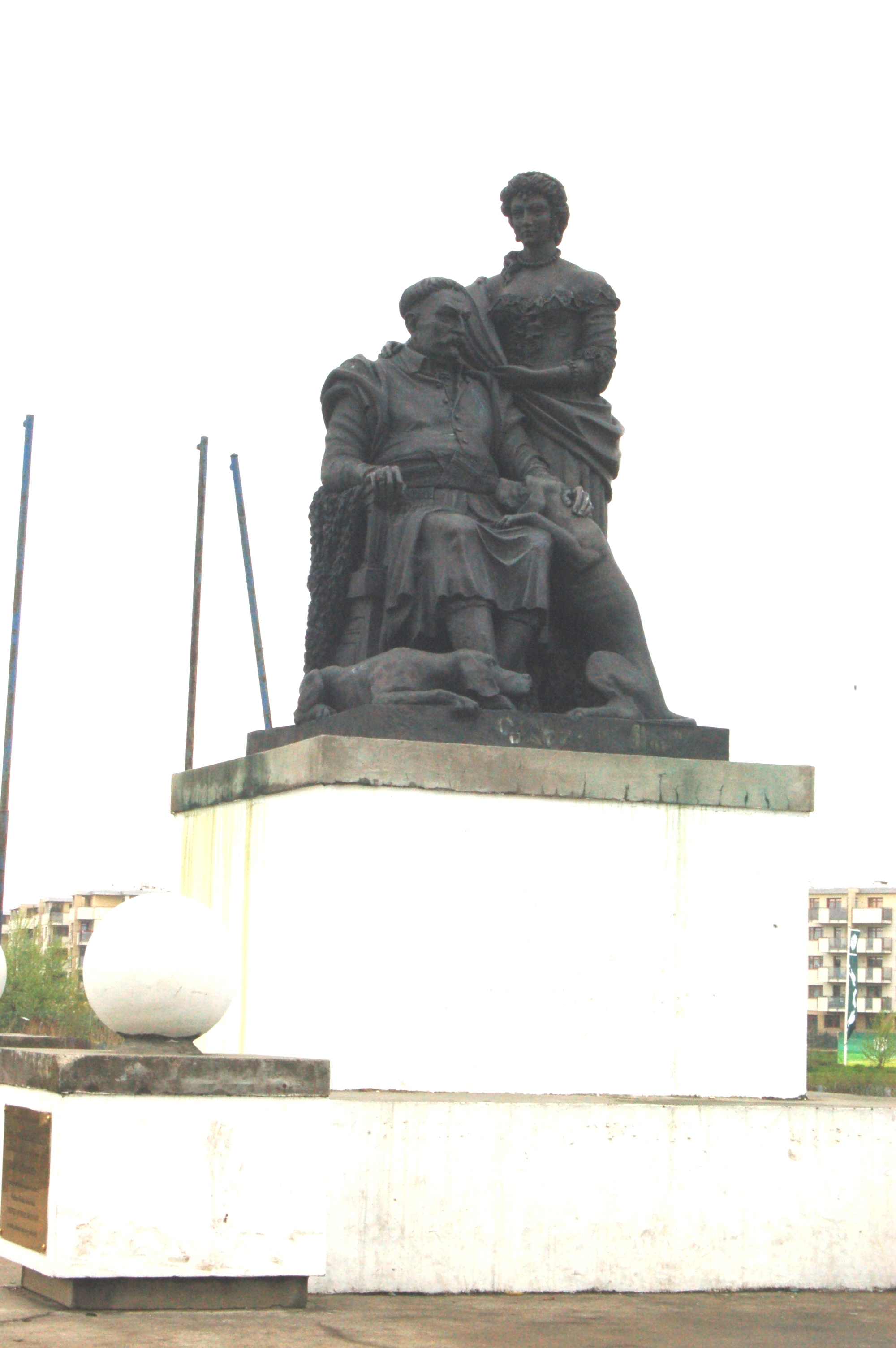
The monument in 2009, at its original location.

The monument, dedicated to king John III Sobieski, monarch of the Polish–Lithuanian Commonwealth from 1674 to 1696, was proposed by artist Tadeusz Dębski, who in 1996 had established a foundation to collect funds for its construction. Around four thousand Wilanów residents voted on the design, choosing a project by sculptor Edward Jeliński. It was then manufactured by him in 1999, in the Pracownia Konserwacji Zabytków Monument workshops in the Royal Baths Park in Warsaw. The statue was unveiled on 9 September 2001, at the intersection of Klimczaka an Przyczółkowa Streets.

Another sculpture made by Tadeusz Dębski was also erected nearby. Made from brass, it had the form of a 9-metre-tall openwork structure, in a shape of a bulava. It was meant to commemorate Sobieski's victorious battles of Khotyn and Vienna.

In 2013, the monument was moved to the park at the intersection of Royal Axis and Sarmacka Streets.

== Characteristics ==
The monument consists of a bronze statue, depicting king John III Sobieski, monarch of the Polish–Lithuanian Commonwealth from 1674 to 1696, sitting on a throne, with his wife, Marie Casimire d'Arquien, standing to his left. Additionally, he is accompanied by two dogs, one lying in front of him, and another resting its paws and head on his lap. The sculpture is placed in the park at the intersection of Royal Axis and Sarmacka Streets.

== See also ==
- John III Sobieski Memorial (Downtown, Warsaw), another sculpture in Warsaw dedicated to Sobieski
