= The River of Stars (film) =

1921 film

- Directed by: Floyd Martin Thornton
- Written by: Edgar Wallace (novel); Leslie Howard Gordon
- Starring: Teddy Arundell; Harry Agar Lyons; Faith Bevan; Philip Anthony
- Cinematography: Percy Strong
- Production company: Stoll Pictures
- Distributed by: Stoll Pictures
- Release date: 1921
- Running time: 5 reels
- Country: United Kingdom
- Languages: Silent; English intertitles

The River of Stars is a 1921 British silent adventure film directed by Floyd Martin Thornton and starring Teddy Arundell, Harry Agar Lyons and Faith Bevan. It was based on the 1913 novel The River of Stars by Edgar Wallace featuring Commissioner Sanders.

== Cast ==
- Teddy Arundell as Augustus Lambaire
- Harry Agar Lyons as Commissioner Sanders
- Faith Bevan as Cynthia Sutton
- Philip Anthony as John Amber
- Dalton Somers as Cornelius J. Whitney
- Fred Thatcher as Frances Sutton
- J. Edwards Barker as Insp. Fells
- Ronald Power as Mr. Sutton

== Bibliography ==
- Low, Rachael. History of the British Film, 1918-1929. George Allen & Unwin, 1971.
