= Szydłowiec sandstone =

Variant of sandstone found in Poland

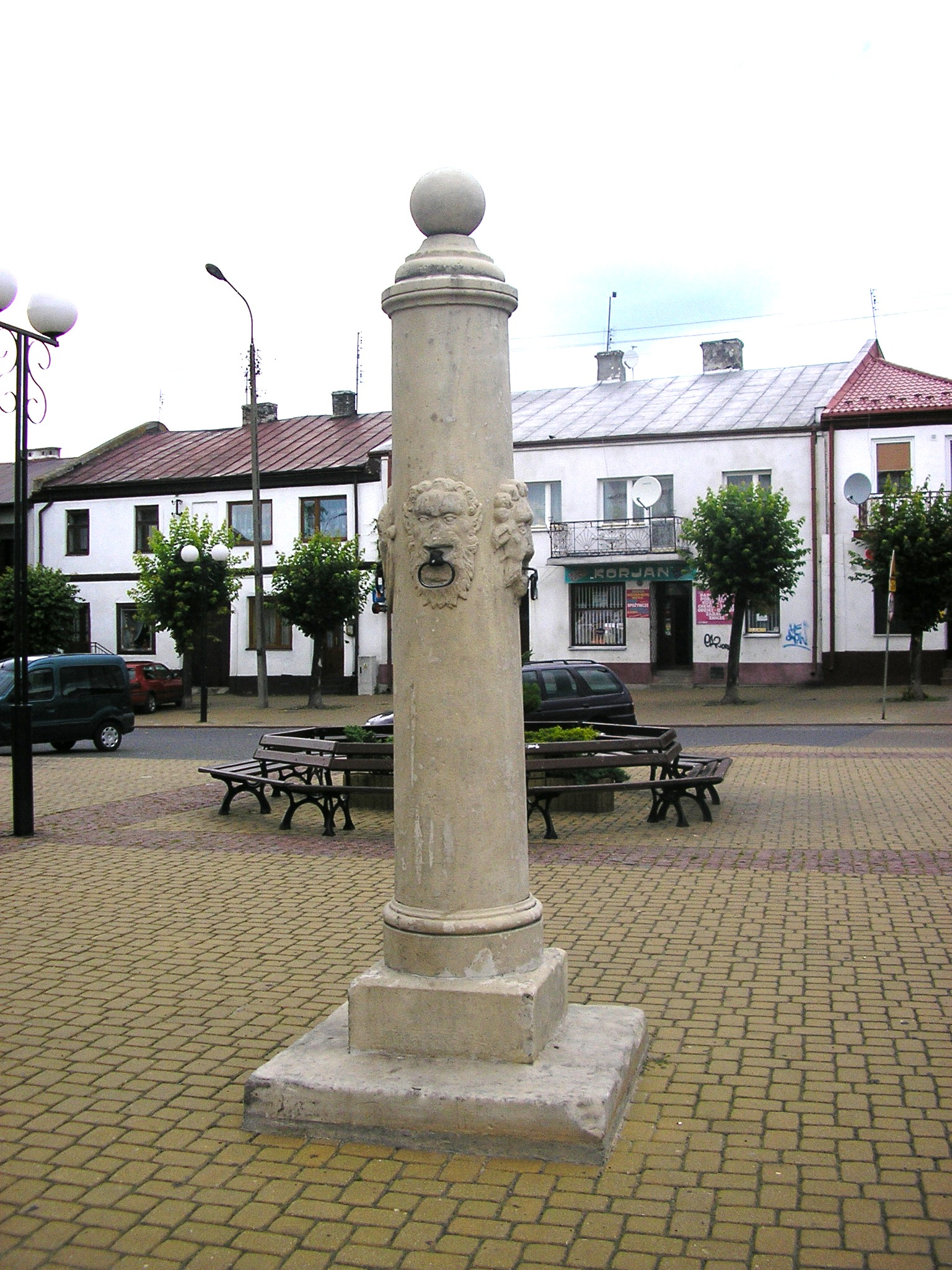
Szydłowiec Pillory, a column made out of Szydłowiec sandstone, located in Szydłowiec, Poland.

Szydłowiec sandstone (Polish: piaskowiec szydłowiecki) is a variation of fine-grained and medium-grained sandstone present in the area around the town of Szydłowiec, Poland.

== Characteristics ==
Szydłowiec sandstone originates from the Jurassic period. It usually has white colour, and less often, yellow. It can be fine-grained or medium-grained, and sometimes elastic. The sandstone consists of layers that vary from a few centimetres to a few metres, with mudstones and claystones present in between. The stone can reach up to 180 m (590.6 ft.) thick. It is characterized by its separateness and blockability. The Szydłowiec sandstone is used in manufacturing tiles, lining, socles, sculptures, and construction aggregate.

== History ==
The Szydłowiec sandstone was historically mined in the area around the town of Szydłowiec, Poland, including in: Chmielów, Końskie, Kunów, Nietulisko Duże, Szydłowiec (Szydłowiec stone quarries), and Rogów.
