= Teddy Arundell =

English actor (1873–1922)

- Born: Edward John Arundell; 1873
- Died: 5 November 1922

Teddy Arundell (1873 in Devon – 5 November 1922 in London) was a British film actor of the silent era.

== Selected filmography ==
- The Lyons Mail (1916)
- Justice (1917)
- Nelson (1918)
- The Swindler (1918)
- The Splendid Coward (1918)
- God's Good Man (1919)
- Mr. Wu (1919)
- The Elusive Pimpernel (1919)
- The Amateur Gentleman (1920)
- The Tavern Knight (1920)
- Bleak House (1920)
- Greatheart (1921)
- The Mystery of Mr. Bernard Brown (1921)
- The Four Just Men (1921)
- General John Regan (1921)
- The Amazing Partnership (1921)
- Kipps (1921)
- The River of Stars (1921)
- Cocaine (1922)
- A Lost Leader (1922)
- The Passionate Friends (1922)
