= The Tavern Knight (novel) =

1904 novel

- 1947 cover
- Author: Rafael Sabatini
- Language: English
- Genre: Historical adventure
- Publication date: 1904
- Publication place: United Kingdom
- Media type: Print

The Tavern Knight is a 1904 historical adventure novel written by the British-Italian writer Rafael Sabatini. It is set during the English Civil Wars.

== Film adaptation ==
In 1920, it was turned into a film, The Tavern Knight, directed by Maurice Elvey made by Britain's largest studio of the silent era, Stoll Pictures. A proposed silent version by Warner Brothers was to star John Barrymore in 1927 but instead the Manon Lescaut story was substituted under the title When a Man Loves.

== Bibliography ==
- Goble, Alan. The Complete Index to Literary Sources in Film. Walter de Gruyter, 1999.
