= André-Jean Lebrun =

French sculptor (1737–1811)

- Born: 1737; Paris, France
- Died: 1811 (aged 73–74); Vilnius, Lithuania
- Occupation: Sculptor

André-Jean Lebrun (1737–1811) was a French sculptor.

== Life ==
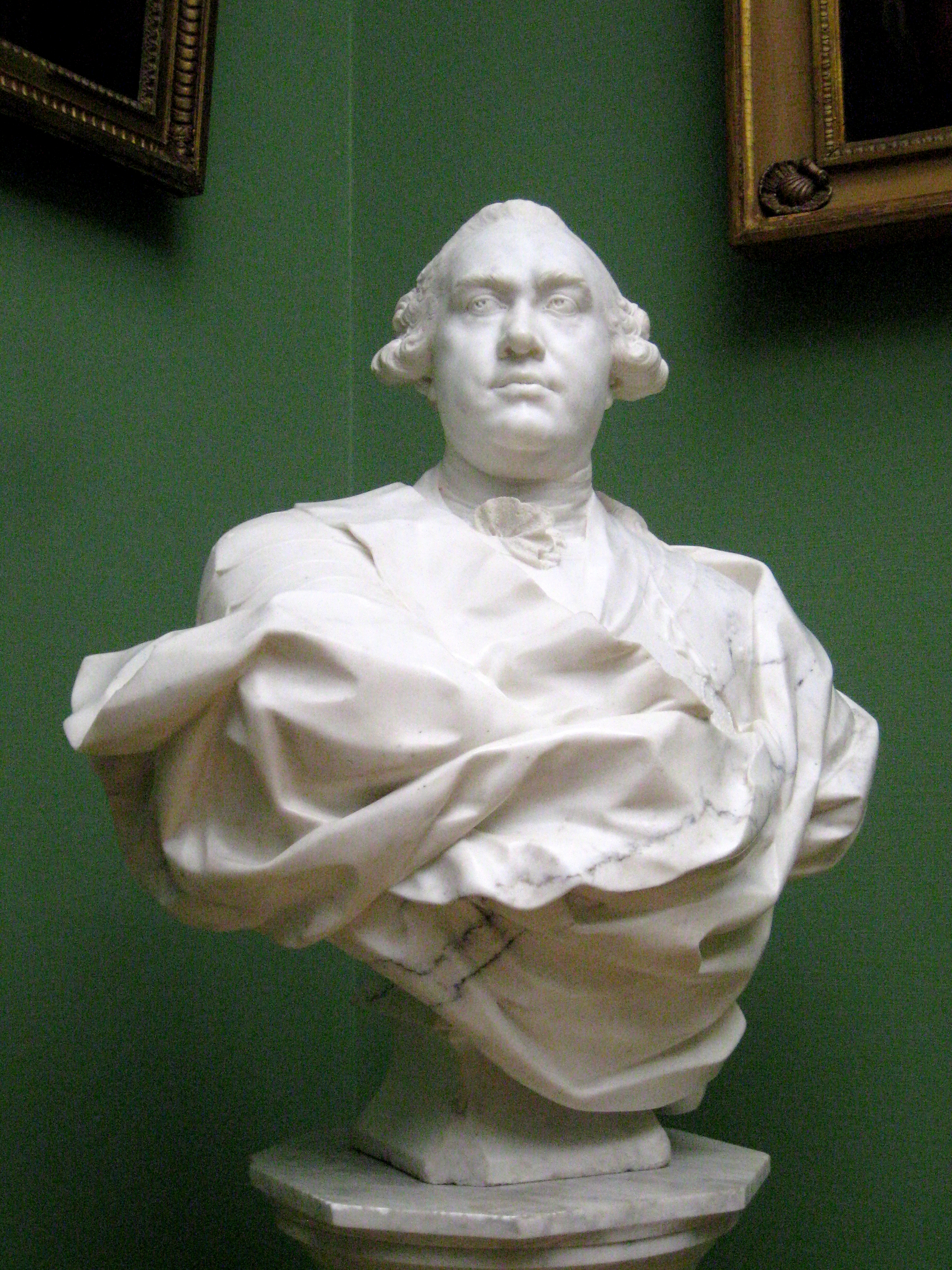
André-Jean Lebrun, Kyrylo Rozumovskyi (1766), Moscow, Tretyakov Gallery.

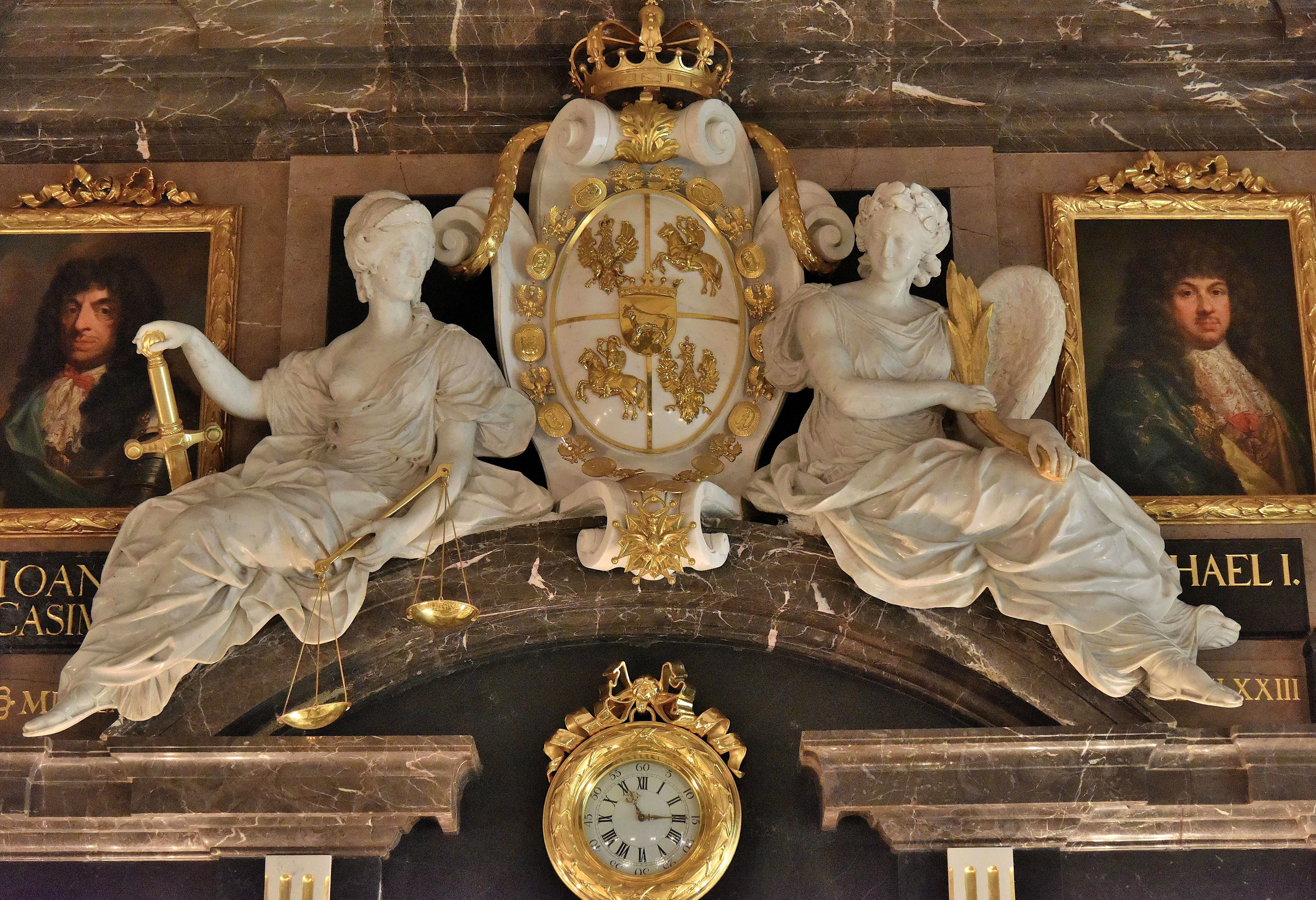
Allegories of Justice and Peace (1771) in the Marble Room at the Royal Castle in Warsaw.

André-Jean Lebrun was born in Paris in 1737. He studied under Jean-Baptiste Pigalle. Lebrun won the Grand Prix of the Académie royale de peinture et de sculpture in 1756. He tied with the sculptor Pierre-François Berruer (1733–1797), winning a scholarship to the Villa Medici in Rome. In Rome he made a number of statues for the church of San Carlo al Corso. These included a statue of Judith. He also carved a bust of Pope Clement XIII (1768). He became a member of the Académie de Saint-Luc and the Académie de Marseille.

Lebrun was invited to Poland on the recommendation of Madame Geoffrin. and was appointed chief sculptor to King Stanisław August Poniatowski. He also worked in Saint Petersburg, Russia, where he made a bust of the Empress Maria Feodorovna. In 1804, he became professor of sculpture at Vilnius University.

He died in Vilnius in 1811.

== Works ==
The Louvre holds three drawings by Lebrun:

- Trois jeunes femmes drapées à l'antique, dansant devant un buste
- Composition allégorique avec Athéna
- Neptune tenant son trident, dans un médaillon orné

Sculpture includes:

- Statue of David, San Carlo al Corso, Rome
- Bust of Count Kirill Razumovsky (1766) Marble. Tretyakov Gallery, Moscow
- Bust of Cardinal Giuseppe Maria Feroni (1767) Marble. Metropolitan Museum of Art, New York
- Bust of King Stanislas Auguste II Poniatowski (1784) New Hrodna Castle, Belarus
