= The Blue Lagoon (1949 film) =

1949 film by Frank Launder

- Lobby card
- Directed by: Frank Launder
- Written by: Novel: Henry De Vere Stacpoole; Screenplay: John Baines; Michael Hogan; Frank Launder
- Produced by: Sidney Gilliat; Frank Launder
- Starring: Jean Simmons; Donald Houston; Noel Purcell; James Hayter; Cyril Cusack
- Cinematography: Geoffrey Unsworth
- Edited by: Thelma Connell
- Music by: Clifton Parker
- Distributed by: General Film Distributors
- Release date: 1 March 1949
- Running time: 101 minutes
- Country: United Kingdom
- Language: English
- Budget: £311,100
- Box office: £351,400 (by 24 December 1949)

The Blue Lagoon is a 1949 British coming-of-age romance and adventure film directed by Frank Launder, produced by Launder and Sidney Gilliat), and starring Jean Simmons and Donald Houston. The screenplay was adapted by John Baines, Michael Hogan, and Launder from the 1908 novel The Blue Lagoon by Henry De Vere Stacpoole. The original music score was composed by Clifton Parker. The cinematographer was Geoffrey Unsworth.

The film tells the story of two young children shipwrecked on a tropical island paradise in the South Pacific. Emotional feelings and physical changes arise as they grow to maturity and fall in love. The film has major thematic similarities to the Biblical account of Adam and Eve.

== Plot ==
In 1841, 9-year-old Emmeline Foster and 10-year-old Michael Reynolds, two British children, are the survivors of a shipwreck in the South Pacific. After days afloat, they are marooned on a lush tropical island in the company of kindly old sailor Paddy Button. Eventually, Paddy falls to his death during a drinking binge, leaving Emmeline and Michael alone. They survive solely on their resourcefulness and the bounty of their remote paradise.

Eight years later, in 1849, the now-adult couple live together in the island paradise, fish, and collect "beads" from the shellfish in the surrounding lagoon. One day, a ship arrives carrying Doctor Murdoch and James Carter, two British men, who are intimated to have fled as criminals from civilization. Surprised to find the couple on the island, Murdoch soon realises that Michael collects valuable pearls without knowing their true worth. While Murdoch attempts to trick Michael into getting him a bounty of pearls, Carter tries to kidnap Emmeline and escape. Murdoch and Carter kill each other on the boat, and Michael and Emmeline vow to never attempt to leave the island again. They marry, and during a tropical storm, a child, Paddy, is born.

In 1852, Emmeline is reminded of the outside world and wants to leave the island. She fears for their child if Michael and she should die. Michael gives in to her pleading, and they pack a small boat and leave the island. Becalmed in mid-ocean, they succumb to exposure. A British ship finds them, but the movie only shows that Paddy is still alive in the small boat, leaving their fate unclear.

== Cast ==
- Jean Simmons as Emmeline Foster
- Donald Houston as Michael Reynolds
- Susan Stranks as Emmeline (younger)
- Peter Rudolph Jones as Michael (younger)
- Noel Purcell as Paddy Button
- James Hayter as Dr. Murdock
- Cyril Cusack as James Carter
- Nora Nicholson as Mrs. Stannard
- Maurice Denham as Ship's Captain
- Philip Stainton as Mr. Ansty
- Patrick Barr as Second Mate
- Lyn Evans as Trotter
- Russell Waters as Craggs
- John Boxer as Nick Corbett
- Bill Raymond as Marsden

== Production history ==
The film was an adaptation of a novel whose previous screen adaptation was completed for release in 1923, but it is the earliest surviving adaptation.

In 1928, Herbert Wilcox acquired the motion picture rights to the novel from I. W. Schlesinger to produce a remake. To eliminate competition with his film, Wilcox purchased all existing prints of the 1923 adaptation that weren't in circulation. A year later, he officially announced the inclusion of this project in his portfolio of motion pictures in production. He planned to film it in multiple-language versions in French and Spanish, in 2-strip Technicolor, and with a full libretto of native music. The project was abandoned due to the Great Depression and was not restarted until 1935, now with backing from the newly formed General Film Distributors (GFD). After development resumed, Wilcox planned to cast either Joel McCrea or Richard Cromwell as the male lead. It was going to be shot in 3-strip Technicolor in Honolulu.

After a spectacular fire at the British and Dominions Imperial Studios on 9 February 1936 destroyed the last surviving print of the 1923 film, Wilcox lost interest in the project, and the rights were assumed by GFD's new sister company Gainsborough Pictures at the recommendation of Frank Launder, who always admired the novel. Gainsborough announced the film in 1938 as part of a slate of 10 films. The stars were to be Michael Redgrave and Margaret Lockwood, who had just appeared in Gainsborough's The Lady Vanishes; Will Fyffe was to co-star. It was going to be shot on location in the East Indies for the exteriors and at the Islington Poole Street studio for the interiors. Carol Reed was going to direct. In 1939, Gainsborough went into a co-production with 20th Century Fox to secure funding, and Lockwood was going to co-star with Richard Greene, under contract to Fox. Plans to make the film were postponed due to World War II.

The project was reactivated after the war and announced in 1946, with Frank Launder attached to direct. Extensive location searches were undertaken before deciding to make the film in Fiji.

Plans to make the film were postponed due to Britain's currency difficulties, but eventually, plans were reactivated.

=== Censorship ===
In 1946, Joseph Breen told Universal Studios that they could turn the book into a movie if they made some changes to follow the Hays Code. Breen said the characters could not be related, the love should be between grown-ups, and there could not be any sex scenes or birth scenes. He also asked them to take out the parents' suicide. In 1948, Breen approved the script with further changes, like no nudity or suggestive content, and suggested they show the marriage passing incontinently. Indeed, though there were rules and restrictions, they still made and released the movie.

=== Casting ===
Jean Simmons was attached to the project at an early stage due to her success in Great Expectations (1946).

Donald Houston was chosen as the male protagonist from a pool of more than 5,000 candidates, including Laurence Harvey and Roger Moore, 100 of whom had screen tests.

=== Filming ===
Before embarking on their journey to the island, Launder, Noel Purcell, and Jean convened with Prince Thakombow of Fiji, who was studying in London at the time. They treated the prince to a tour of Pinewood, followed by a relaxed discussion regarding the film's production intricacies, including the imminent expedition to the islands, which the prince enthusiastically supported. Before departure, Jean had the privilege of visiting Henry de Vere Stacpoole, the author of The Blue Lagoon, who resided on the Isle of Wight. During this visit, the 84-year-old gifted Jean a green coral charm he had acquired from Fiji four decades earlier while gathering material for his renowned novel.

On 27 November 1947, Jean Simmons embarked on a journey from Poole aboard a BOAC seaplane bound for Sydney, Australia. Arranged by the Rank Organisation in coordination with her voyage to Fiji, a comprehensive tour of Australia was on her itinerary. The extensive flight included layovers in Cairo, Calcutta, and Singapore. Her departure garnered significant press coverage, with film footage capturing the moment featured in various newsreels. The farewell at the airport was emotionally charged, particularly for Winifred, Jean's mother, who accompanied her daughter. This marked not only Jean's maiden flight but also her inaugural trip abroad, evoking tears as mother and daughter bid each other farewell. After three days, Jean encountered a delay in her flight bound for Sydney when the immigration service in Darwin detained her and twelve other passengers for three hours. Their vaccination documents against cholera were deemed insufficient, causing concern as they had arrived from Cairo, where the virus was rampant, prompting scrutiny from the Australian Department of Health. Fortunately, the situation was resolved the following day.

Jean's journey encountered complications when the Brisbane airport closure due to inclement weather halted the resumption of her travels. After a prolonged wait, the plane, which had paused for refueling, eventually landed in Sydney on 2 December amidst the enthusiastic welcome of 50 fans. Her first act upon arrival, as recounted in local media, was to send a food parcel to her mother. On 5 December, she graced the gala premiere of Launder's latest film, Captain Boycott, featuring Stewart Granger, who later married Simmons. Jean's explorations across Australia, spanning from Sydney to Adelaide to Melbourne and back, were meticulously documented in national newspapers. Engagements such as press interviews, radio appearances, visits to various institutions including hospitals, schools, botanical gardens, and zoos, as well as attendance at film premieres, ballet performances, formal dinners, and other public events, filled her schedule until 21 December, when she finally departed for the Fiji Islands. There was uncertainty regarding her entry into Fiji due to her age of 18. The colonial government of Fiji was discussing the possibility of prohibiting individuals under 19 from entering the country as a preventative measure against the introduction of polio. On 22 December, a light plane carrying Leslie Gilliat, the producer and brother of Sidney Gilliat, crashed into a river near Suva. Both Gilliat and the pilot escaped unharmed. On New Year's Eve, Houston and Simmons were almost injured in Fiji when their car was overturned.

The crew initially filmed scenes around Suva's capital, lodging at the Grand Pacific Hotel on the southeastern shore of Viti Levu. Filming on coral reefs in rough seas resulted in injuries for almost every member. After a stop in Lautoka, they traveled to the Yasawa Islands via motorboats from Australia. Jean and her dresser Irene Williams had a cabin to themselves but later shared it with four other crew members. Despite the challenges, the director praised Jean's cooperative attitude in a lengthy article about their experience. During the production, challenges arose in the form of mosquitos, sandflies, snakes, and sharks, which posed threats to the crew's well-being. While Jean managed to escape unscathed, Donald Houston found himself hospitalized after sustaining a severe injury while swimming through a rock-bound water chute. Similarly, Launder suffered a broken wrist towards the end of the shooting, requiring him to wear a sling. These incidents underscored the hazards encountered during the filming process.

Due to bad weather conditions, the filming process was prolonged for three months. By mid-March 1948, the production unit achieved 90% of its objective in Fiji, accomplishing 222 camera set-ups, equivalent to around 37 minutes of screen time, or roughly one-third of the completed film. Following three months spent on location, Jean prepared to return to London where filming was set to resume at Pinewood Studios in April. Demonstrating astute planning, Rank arranged her journey back, incorporating stops in Hollywood and New York. This strategic decision was made to promote Jean, who remained relatively unknown in the United States, through local publicity efforts. Arriving in San Francisco on 17 March with a bandaged foot after cutting it on a piece of coral on the last day of shooting in Fiji, Jean was warmly welcomed by her long-separated sister Edna. A horde of reporters awaited her at the Mark Hopkins Hotel and again at Union Station in Los Angeles, where she proceeded after a day. Collecting clothes sent from England and meeting bigwigs Walter Wanger and Howard Hughes marked her first day at the Beverly Hills Hotel, followed by a star-studded cocktail party in her honour. Hollywood offered her a lead role soon, however, she sought advice from her mentor J. Arthur Rank before taking a decision. Her most remarkable moment was attending the 20th Academy Awards as an official receiver and collecting the award for Best Cinematography on behalf of Jack Cardiff, among several others. The prestigious night ended at the Mocambo nightclub socialising with celebrated winners.

The remaining film production took place at Pinewood, with an interruption in late July 1948. Upon the resumption of filming, the studio's make-up artist, George Blacker, was tasked with harmonizing the skin tones of Jean Simmons and Donald Houston, as their natural tones were swiftly diminishing. The official opening of the Olympic Games at Wembley necessitated the urgent use of all of Rank's Technicolor cameras. The final sequences were completed after the Olympic Games, with filming concluding by the end of September.

== Reception ==
=== Commercial ===
The Blue Lagoon was the seventh-most popular film at the British box office in 1949. According to Kinematograph Weekly, the 'biggest winner' at the box office in 1949 Britain was The Third Man with "runners up" being Johnny Belinda, The Secret Life of Walter Mitty, The Paleface, Scott of the Antarctic, The Blue Lagoon, Maytime in Mayfair, Easter Parade, Red River, and You Can't Sleep Here.

The film generated producer's receipts amounting to £186,500 within the United Kingdom and £164,900 in overseas markets, ultimately yielding a profit of £40,300 by 24 December 1949 primarily driven by its international earnings.

=== Critical ===
==== Contemporary ====
Writing for the Spectator, Virginia Graham praised the film by deftly navigating the potential pitfalls of a South Seas romance, anticipating a clichéd spectacle of tropical excess but finding instead a charming narrative. She commended the film for its restraint from sentimentality, noting the poignant early scenes with child actors Susan Stranks and Peter Jones. She criticized Donald Houston's acting, albeit acknowledging his aesthetic fit for the role while praising Jean Simmons for her performance. Graham also highlighted the film's visual appeal, particularly the scenery. Despite the film's potential for tropical clichés, Graham found it pleasantly devoid of such excesses, making it rather charming.

Writing for the New Statesman, William Whitebait offered a disparaging perspective, likening the arrival of popular novels and plays to the screen to the unanticipated appearance of a heavily advertised product on a store shelf. He stated, "Best-sellers from the circulating library and the stage have an awful way of looming up on the screen like some toothpaste or pickle which, threatening for years from advertisements, at last, confronts us as the only brand on the counter." Whitebait described the film as a "sad, absurd little idyll" of two castaways, a boy, and a girl, on an island, criticizing the lack of character growth, the film's reliance on the idyllic setting, and the charm of its leads, Donald Houston and Jean Simmons. He noted, "They do a good deal of hopping about beaches instead; and since Mr. Donald Houston and Miss Jean Simmons make a charming pair, and the beach is real Pacific in Technicolor, this is a dream of a film for the snowy evenings." Whitebait concluded his review with a critique of Houston's performance, suggesting that the actor may have taken liberties with his character's dialogue. He wrote, "I don’t know, by the way, that Mr. Houston had been playing quite fair, because when the revelation comes he quotes very pat to the moment [John] Donne’s 'I wonder, by my troth, what thou and I Did till we loved?'"

According to A. H. Weiler, a reviewer from the New York Times, the film depicted a tranquil Polynesian utopia accurately but was lacking in excitement. Nonetheless, he acknowledged that the leisurely-paced events were juxtaposed against a picturesque backdrop of Technicolor sunsets, gorgeous beaches, and verdant vegetation. Additionally, he commended the competent performances of the limited cast. Nevertheless, Weiler believed that the movie's most noteworthy feature was its magnificent Technicolor scenery.

In his review for Variety, Harold Myers expressed that the Technicolor cinematography of a stunning South Pacific setting was an appropriate and romantic setting for the movie. However, he found fault with the weak plot and stated that the tale of two children marooned on a South Sea island lacked a cohesive storyline. Although he praised the movie's visual beauty, he criticised the leading actors for not being challenged beyond their physical appearances.

A Harrison's Reports critic gave a mixed review. The reviewer praised the film's aesthetic qualities and its visually appealing elements. However, the critic had reservations over the plausibility of the narrative and the predominantly sluggish tempo of the picture.

The Monthly Film Bulletin offered a nuanced perspective, noting initial interest and action in the narrative before a decline in momentum. While praising Noel Purcell's excellent portrayal of the sailor and the standout performance of Cyril Cusack as a trader, it found the lead actors, Jean Simmons and Donald Houston, competent but not outstanding. The review acknowledged the film's visual appeal, citing beautiful Fijian locations and impressive cinematography, but criticized its length and perceived lack of depth.

Mandel Herbstman, a critic for the Motion Picture Daily, however, gave a positive review of the movie. He liked how the film used Technicolor to show both beautiful and violent scenes of nature. Herbstman thought that the movie would appeal to a wide range of viewers and could fit into different types of adventure and romance stories. He also mentioned that the film's tension and violent moments added to its dramatic impact. Herbstman praised Jean Simmons' portrayal of the lead female character for her physical grace and innocence. Lastly, he thought that Donald Houston did a good job as the male lead.

Jay Carmody of the Washington Star called it a summertime love cinema must-see. Carmody praised Jean Simmons' film star performance. The film's sensitive and tasteful depiction of two youngsters stranded on a beautiful South Pacific island was praised. Carmody liked the film's unexpected emotional and event depth. He also appreciated the well-used comedy, which enhanced the story. Simmons and Donald Houston's portrayals of Emmeline and Michael, the film's adult characters, were Carmody's highlights. Carmody called The Blue Lagoon a great film, praising Simmons' charming and innocent performance and the supporting cast's work.

The Newsweek reviewer offered a critical perspective. While praising the genuine portrayal of the children's arrival on the island and the film's visual appeal, its loss of credibility and slow character development were criticised. The reviewer also pointed out the contrived nature of the romantic plot and its reliance on coincidences. Despite these flaws, the reviewer acknowledged the film's effectiveness as a form of tropical escapism.

Time criticised the picture for its weaknesses and wasted opportunity. The reviewer found the film's South Sea romance tedious and emotionally sluggish, like a Norse saga. The review praised the film's Technicolour cinematography and delightful props but criticised the absence of character dialogue. Contrived catastrophes like an underwater struggle with an octopus and a delayed sex exploration were unsatisfying attempts to make up for this shortfall. The reviewer also criticised the plot, notably the representation of a child's birth, which they considered unsuitable for Jean Simmons.

Lesley Morris of The Advocate criticized the movie for its childish and dull plot, stating that despite its visually stunning scenes and beautiful locations, extensive publicity, and efforts such as shooting in Fiji, the film couldn't escape failure, hinting at mismanagement of resources and indirectly holding J. Arthur Rank accountable for the flawed execution.

Mae Tinée for the Chicago Tribune praised the film's picturesque setting and captivating beginning, with skilful scenes of survival on a deserted island. She commended the performances of the cast, particularly the child actors and Noel Purcell. However, she noted a loss of momentum in the narrative as it transitions into a routine romance. Tinée highlighted the film's superb cinematography, including stunning shots of nature and a dramatic hurricane scene. She criticized the pacing in the later reels, suggesting it could have concluded more effectively.

The Sydney Sunday Herald appreciated the film's visual depiction of adolescent reading material and romantic entertainment value, noticing its lack of novelty but noting its commercial success. The critic praised the Technicolour cinematography and sensitively depicted sensual awakening between the heroes. The two villains' temporary disturbance and the couple's baby-rearing difficulty are discussed. The performers performed well, and the reviewer said the film's choice fit Stacpoole's romantic literary style.

In his review for The Age, Erle Cox expressed disappointment over film producers' interference in adapting literary works to the screen, sympathizing with the original authors and criticizing the alterations made by producers, particularly in the story's ending. However, he acknowledged the film's faithful use of the source material, praised the lead actors' performances, and highlighted the film's scenic tropical setting. He also pointed out memorable scenes, such as an underwater battle and a fortuitous hurricane during filming.

Philip K. Scheuer of the Los Angeles Times commended the film for its enchanting use of cinematography to depict a tropical romance. He praised the development of Jean Simmons and Donald Houston's characters, who evolve from castaways to parents over a decade on a South Sea island. Scheuer noted the film's portrayal of life's extremes, including birth, death, and the struggle for survival, culminating in the characters' rescue by a passing ship. He compared the narrative favorably to stories by Powell and Pressburger and acknowledged the British team's affectionate treatment of the plot. The review succinctly covered dramatic moments, character development, and production insights, all the while applauding the film's romantic and adventurous spirit, standout performances, and directorial prowess.

Richard L. Coe of The Washington Post portrayed the film as a consequence of an unexpected encounter with a how-to-behave manner book, deeming it a pleasant watch, despite its narrative shortcomings. Coe observed the film's struggle to define its narrative focus, appreciating the characters' survival skills and instinct for proper attire, highlighting a thwarted attempt to lure the characters into civilization and emphasising the significance of a book of etiquette in guiding the girl's behaviour. Despite an uncertain objective and leisurely pace, the film was commended for its cool escape quality, an attractive central duo, and visually appealing Technicolor cinematography.

The China Mail's review praised the film for its captivating portrayal of two characters stranded on a Pacific island, commending the expert colour photography, vibrant visuals, and sincere performances while acknowledging minor pacing issues and deeming it likely to appeal to a broad audience appreciating its engaging narrative and unusual climax.

The Hong Kong Telegraph lauded the movie as a genuine escape, with the picturesque setting of Jean Simmons and Donald Houston as castaways, featuring real footage of a hurricane in Fiji, and delivering refreshing entertainment through their enjoyable performances, particularly Noel Purcell's effective portrayal of the sailor landing with them on the island as children.

The film was praised by The Voice for its charm and exquisite visuals. Jean Simmons received praise for her fitting performance as Emmeline, while Donald Houston impressed as the young man. Noel Purcell's portrayal of the sailor was highly regarded, and James Hayter and Cyril Cusack were praised for their effective portrayal of two deceitful characters.

In his review for The New Republic, Robert Hatch characterized the film as a "monument to unbecoming innocence," depicting the challenges faced by two English children stranded on a tropical island as they navigated the complexities of adulthood, with additional elements like an octopus, pearl hunters, and a treetop apartment left unspecified in terms of their impact on the overall film.

Myles Standish from The St. Louis Post-Dispatch lauded the film's stunning Technicolor visuals of the South Seas, while criticizing the weak storyline which did not match its visually striking setting. Standish pointed out the film's failed attempt to contrast island life with societal chaos, especially in its portrayal of English renegades. While he praised actress Jean Simmons for her performance, he lamented the film's inability to give her a significant role and lack of artistic camera work. Standish concluded that the film did not effectively leverage its visual and casting strengths, leading to a narrative that fell short of its vibrant setting.

Roberts Dunstan of the Melbourne Herald provided a critical review of the film, noting significant deviations from the source material. Dunstan expressed confusion about the film's aspirations, criticizing the tepid and unconvincing portrayal of the central love story between two shipwrecked characters. Terms such as "underplayed" and "lukewarm" were used to emphasize the perceived lack of passion and intensity in the romantic elements. The review highlighted the panoramic photography depicting the South Sea setting as the sole positive aspect. Overall, it presented a scathing assessment of a film that failed to capture the essence of the novel and fell short of delivering a compelling cinematic experience, with its visual aesthetics standing as the only redeeming quality.

F. Keith Manzie of The Argus conveyed an overall positive assessment, lauding the lead performances of Jean Simmons and Donald Houston. He described Simmons as "youthful, easy-mannered, and altogether charming," highlighting her as J. Arthur Rank's most promising screen player. The film was commended for its visual appeal, with particular praise for the exciting quality of the early scenes featuring the shipwreck and the marooned children, likened to The Swiss Family Robinson. Manzie noted that The Blue Lagoon stood out among island-themed films of the time, positioning it as the only one deemed acceptable, especially when compared to others featuring Dorothy Lamour and Jon Hall. The lead characters, Emmeline and Michael, were positively appraised, with Simmons being hailed as the most attractive island girl in the film. The supporting cast, including Susan Stranks, Peter Jones, and Noel Purcell, were also recognized for their performances. Despite a noted shift in tone as the characters grew up, the review concluded that The Blue Lagoon provided an agreeable experience as a piece of escapism, successfully offering a visually pleasing and immersive break from reality.

The July 1949 issue of Movieland magazine presented a positive review of the movie, capturing the film's enchanting and visually captivating essence. The reviewer, in a whimsical tone, celebrated the movie's ability to fulfil the universal fantasy of a tropical island shipwreck and the allure of a Robinson Crusoe-like existence, especially with a romantic interest in the opposite sex. Applauding the use of Technicolor and the superb scenery that heightened the cinematic experience, the review highlighted the exquisite portrayal of the character's growth by Jean Simmons and the fitting depiction of the hero by Donald Houston, who was appropriately described as "browned and muscular." Despite acknowledging a lack of narrative coherence, the reviewer maintained an optimistic stance, asserting that the film's overall fascination, beauty, and romantic charm would contribute to audience enjoyment, making The Blue Lagoon a compelling cinematic venture.

Helen Hendricks of Screenland appreciated the film's adventurous plot and the convincing transformation of the protagonists from children to adults, played by Donald Houston and Jean Simmons. However, she subtly criticised their desire to leave their paradise, indicating a conflict between nature's allure and societal constructs.

Paul Jones of The Atlanta Constitution positively reviewed the film, lauding the unique storyline and the vibrant use of Technicolor, and expressed confidence in the cast's capability to deliver compelling performances, particularly highlighting Jean Simmons' previous memorable role in Hamlet.

In his Film Review, F. Maurice Speed expressed disappointment, deeming it the least interesting work Sidney Gilliat and Frank Launder had produced up to that point. The film failed to captivate Speed, who conveyed a sense of dissatisfaction with the outcome of Gilliat and Launder's ambitious cinematic endeavour.

Pierre Robin of La Cinématographie Française critiqued the film as long and static, though he acknowledged the well-executed dramatic scenes, adequate staging, aesthetically appealing colour palette and locations, and recognized the performances of Susan Stranks, Peter Jones, Jean Simmons, and Donald Houston while deeming Noel Purcell's portrayal of a grumpy sailor as perfect.

M.J. McMahon of the Australian Women’s Weekly had appreciated the film's aesthetic appeal, noting the 'naive charm' and 'lovely' scenery, a result of the location work in Fiji, and the characters' development, from shipwrecked children to mature adults. The plot had been described as 'light and fragile', suggesting it was not the film's main strength. McMahon had also highlighted the performances of Jean Simmons and Donald Houston, the romantic leads, with a slight critique of Houston's performance as 'stilted at times'.

Sydney Tomholt from the Australian Broadcasting Commission criticised the film's non-traditional narrative about two shipwrecked children, citing a weak script devoid of realism and incident. The initial part was praised for character portrayal but introducing island traders shifted the narrative to melodrama, lessening engagement. The ending, differing from the book, was noted. Despite an exciting octopus fight and stunning tropical scenes, the film's dull portrayal of castaways' life, acted by Jean Simmons and Donald Houston, was criticised.

Edwin Miller's review in Seventeen magazine describes the film as a captivating English production. Despite its unhurried pacing, Miller highlighted the movie's appeal through its vivid color photography and inherent simplicity. The cinematography not only enhanced the visual experience but also complemented the film's straightforward charm, making it an enjoyable and pleasant viewing experience.

John Burke of the International Film Review called the film “silly” by criticizing the performance of Jean Simmons as an “imitation of Dorothy Lamour,” but praised the performances of James Hayter and Cyril Cusack.

Alan Dent of The Illustrated London News praised the film, highlighting its simplicity, sentimentality, and charm. He noted its portrayal of a timeless love story similar to classical and biblical tales, and pointed out the strong performances, the lack of offensive content, and minor plot deviations that increase interest. He also emphasized the film's visual elegance, innocence, and universal appeal, predicting its widespread success and valuing its craftsmanship and emotional sincerity.

The Punch reviewer called the movie “a lot of nonsense,” but found it “entertaining” by praising “many of the scenes” as “a real pleasure to look at.”

==== Retrospective ====
In 1952, Paul Rotha called the film "an escape into empty romanticism." In his 1964 book Where We Came In, C.A. Oakley criticized the film, calling it a 'pot-boiler', suggesting that it lacked creativity and critical acclaim despite being financially successful. In the Sunday Times Guide to Movies on Television, Angela Allan called the film "slow-moving but ultimately pleasant idyll on desert isle." Despite the narrative potential that its source material offered, George Perry wrote in his book The Great British Picture Show that the movie ultimately fell short of expectations and provided a rather underwhelming cinematic experience. Steven H. Scheuer gave it a two-star rating, suggesting a lukewarm reception, and noted the picturesque scenery but asserted that it failed to compensate for the film's narrative weaknesses. Described as a "moderate adventure drama," his review provides minimal commentary on the cast and director, emphasizing the film's shortcomings in storytelling despite its visual appeal. Leonard Maltin called the film "slowly paced but refreshing."

In a 2007 analysis, Shane Burridge compared the 1949 and 1980 film adaptations of The Blue Lagoon. Burridge faulted the 1949 version for its superficial treatment of survival and abrupt maturation while praising the 1980 remake's explicit sexual content. He commended the 1949 film's innocence and performances but noted unsettling hints of a grim finale. Burridge suggested that audience preference might swing between the original and the remake based on these elements.

Robin Holabird wrote in 2021 that the movie "captures the tone using less salaciousness than the 1980 interpretation." He praised it as a respectable endeavour owing to the involvement of a director who once worked with Alfred Hitchcock, an Academy Award-winning cinematographer, and talented actress Jean Simmons.

== Legacy ==
David Cronenberg has stated to David Breskin that it was the scariest movie that he ever saw as a child due to the separation of the child protagonists and their parents. According to Cronenberg, "I think kids can take a lot of things that adults find terrifying, but what is almost universally terrifying for a kid is the idea of being separated from his parents".

An interview with Susan Stranks for the BFI channel on YouTube in 2021 revived interest in the film.

== Other versions and sequel ==
- The novel was adapted into a motion picture by a Hollywood studio (Columbia Pictures) for the first time in a version that was released in 1980 starring Brooke Shields and Christopher Atkins. The updated version, directed by Randal Kleiser and written by Douglas Day Stewart, included nudity and sexual content, although not as much as the book. According to Kleiser himself, it was the book and not the 1949 film that inspired his version of the story, but his version did use the same locations as the 1949 film. That version was followed in 1991 by the sequel Return to the Blue Lagoon, starring Milla Jovovich and Brian Krause. Although the sequel bears a strong similarity to the 1980 film, it bears little resemblance to Stacpoole's second novel, The Garden of God. The pearl-greedy traders do not appear in Stacpoole's original novel, but in the third novel, The Gates of Morning, a pair of sailors attack the people of a nearby island for pearls after seeing a woman wearing a double pearl hair ornament, as Emmeline does in the 1949 film.
- A "contemporary remake" of The Blue Lagoon was made for television in 2012. Called Blue Lagoon: The Awakening, it depicts two teenagers Emmaline Robinson (Indiana Evans) and Dean McCullen (Brenton Thwaites) being stranded on a tropical island. The male lead from the 1980 film, Christopher Atkins, appears in this film as one of the teachers on the shipborne field trip where Emma and Dean are lost at sea and end up on an island.

== Availability ==
The Blue Lagoon made its television debut in the United States on ABC's Famous Film Festival on 18 December 1955. By the 1960s and 1970s, it became a television staple but, due to tighter broadcast schedules and several royalty disputes, its last appearances on broadcast television were in 1980 on WOR-TV in New York, in 1981 on TCN-9 in Sydney, and in 1982 on Tyne Tees Television. As a result, the film remained unseen on television due to rights conflicts between the estate of the novel's author Henry De Vere Stacpoole, who died in 1951, and controlled the motion picture rights to the story in every English-language-speaking country except for the United States, where the novel has already become part of the public domain, and the Rank Organisation, who controlled the rights to the 1949 film, rendering the movie as a virtual orphan work. Due to these issues, the film has not yet been released formally on home video. However, Carlton Communications, later merged with Granada plc to form ITV plc, which inherited Rank's film library, licensed clips of the film to Sony Pictures Home Entertainment for their 2003 DVD release of the 1980 film adaptation of the book.

== Preservation ==
One 16mm copy is held at the UCLA Film and Television Archive. The film could be viewed at the BFI National Archive.

== See also ==
- State of nature
