= Florence Stacpoole =

British writer (1850–1942)

- Born: 1850; Dublin, Ireland
- Died: 2 December 1942 (age 92); Gosport, Hampshire, England, U.K.
- Known for: Women's health writing
- Relatives: William Henry Stacpoole (brother); Henry de Vere Stacpoole (brother)

Florence Stacpoole (1850 – 2 December 1942) was an Irish writer and lecturer based in England. Her works focused on health and budgeting advice for women.

== Early life ==
Florence Stacpoole was born in Dublin, the daughter of Rev. William Church Stacpoole and Charlotte Augusta Mountjoy. Her father was dean of Kingstown and a doctor of divinity in Trinity College Dublin. Two of her brothers were writers; William Henry Stacpoole wrote children's books and Henry de Vere Stacpoole wrote novels including The Blue Lagoon (1908). Her brother-in-law Henry Bremridge Briggs was also a writer. Her sister Lillie Stacpoole Haycraft was a portrait painter. Some branches of the family use the spelling "Stackpole".

== Career ==
Stacpoole moved to Gosport in Hampshire. She wrote and lectured predominantly on women's health, child care, and household management. Stacpoole was also a suffragist. She was published by the National Health Society where she was a lecturer. Stacpoole was a member of the Obstetrical Society of London and she worked for the Councils of Technical Education as a lecturer. Stacpoole was a member of the British Astronomical Association; she was also religious and part of the Modern Churchman's Union.

Stacpoole died 2 December 1942, at the age of 92, in Gosport, Hampshire.

== Works ==
In addition to her books and her pamphlets for the National Health Society, Stacpoole also published articles in journals and magazines, including the British Medical Journal. She wrote an adventure novel, The King's Diamond, which was serialized in newspapers between 1902 and 1905. Two subsequent novels by Stacpoole, The Mystery of the Manor House and The Uninvited Guest, were also published as serials.

- A Talk with Young Mothers (1890)
- Our Sick and How to Take Care of Them (1892)
- Indigestion (1892)
- Advice to women on the care of their health before, during, and after confinement (1894)
- The care of infants and young children and invalid feeding (1895)
- Handbook of housekeeping for small incomes (1898)
- Homely Hints for District Visitors (about 1897)
- Thrifty Housekeeping (1898)
- Home Cooking (1898, 1906)
- "Private Nursing Homes" (1901)
- The King's Diamond (1902, novel)
- Ailments of women and girls (1904)
- A Healthy Home and How to Keep it (1905)
- Women's health and how to take care of it (1906)
- The Mother's Book on the Rearing of Healthy Children (1912)
- Our Babies and How to Take Care of Them
- The Home Doctor
- The Health View of Temperance
