= Thief of Hearts =

- Theatrical release film poster
- Directed by: Douglas Day Stewart
- Written by: Douglas Day Stewart
- Produced by: Jerry Bruckheimer; Tom Jacobson; Don Simpson
- Starring: Steven Bauer; Barbara Williams; John Getz
- Cinematography: Andrew Laszlo
- Edited by: Tom Rolf
- Music by: Harold Faltermeyer
- Production company: Don Simpson/Jerry Bruckheimer Films
- Distributed by: Paramount Pictures
- Release date: October 19, 1984
- Running time: 100 minutes
- Country: United States
- Language: English
- Budget: $8 million
- Box office: $10,400,000

Thief of Hearts is a 1984 American erotic drama-thriller produced by Don Simpson and Jerry Bruckheimer. It was written and directed by Douglas Day Stewart. It stars Steven Bauer, Barbara Williams, John Getz and David Caruso.

== Plot ==
A burglar, Scott Muller, teams up with his friend Buddy Calamara, a valet at a high-society restaurant. Buddy keeps an eye on Mickey and Ray Davis, a rich married couple, while Scott robs their home.

One of the items Scott takes is a diary belonging to Mickey. One night, Scott reads the diary and discovers that Mickey, an interior designer, yearns for a more interesting life. He quickly becomes infatuated with her. The diary is full of her fantasies and dreams, so Scott plans to turn these into reality.

Mickey's husband, children's book author Ray Davis, gets too involved in his work and neglects Mickey's needs. Scott uses his inside knowledge to seduce her, using the pretext of needing someone to re-design his apartment, and posing as a school supply company CEO. The forbidden romance soon blossoms into a passionate sexual relationship, as Ray becomes suspicious.

During another robbery, Buddy kills a policeman who spotted him and Scott. Scott becomes more and more tense when Mickey starts asking questions about him and his past. Ray decides to follow Scott with his friend and publisher Marty Morrison. They snoop around the building used by the robbers and find out Scott is the thief who stole his belongings.

Buddy sees Ray at the building. He tells Scott, who, visibly agitated, goes to see Mickey, asking her to leave the city with him, revealing he was the one who stole her diary. Ray and fights with Scott, and when Mickey comes to Ray's aid, Scott leaves.

When the Davises go to a restaurant, Scott breaks into their home and reads Mickey's latest diary entry. Buddy intends to rob them again and Scott tries to stop him. They fight and one gets stabbed with Buddy's knife. Ray and Mickey come home to find the last standing intruder still in the house.

Mickey gets out her pistol and aims at the masked man. A gunshot is heard and the man stumbles down. The police arrives and it is revealed that the man shot was Buddy. Mickey goes to the bedroom and finds out that Scott is there, alive but wounded. Rather than be arrested for having shot Buddy, he escapes from the police through the window as Mickey watches him running in the dark.

== Cast ==
- Steven Bauer as Scott Muller
- Barbara Williams as Mickey Davis
- John Getz as Ray Davis
- David Caruso as Buddy Calamara
- Christine Ebersole as Janie Pointer
- George Wendt as Marty Morrison
- Alan North as Sweeney
- Joe Nesnow as Security Guard
- Annette Sinclair as College Girl

== Production ==
Douglas Day Stewart wrote and directed the film off the back of his successful scripts for The Blue Lagoon and especially An Officer and a Gentleman. The latter was produced by Jerry Bruckheimer who produced Thief of Hearts. Stewart called the film "an unusual romantic drama best described as an American Last Tango in Paris... I never try to write to the market. I just write love-themed material. I think my last project shows there has been terrible starvation for love themed projects in the movies."

Stewart said "The story started for me about 12 years ago, when I was robbed. You start to try to put faces to the people that came in and walked around and lifted your personal possessions. They might have touched the bed where you slept, or looked at that intimate photo in that drawer. That was the beginning of the story, but I didn't quite have a handle on it for many years until I added the element of the journals."

Stewart says he "read all those books about women's sexual fantasies. I talked to women about their fantasies. I read journal entries. It proved to me that women lived so much inside their fantasies that men didn't realize it." Stewart estimated he did 23 drafts. Filming started February 13, 1984 in San Francisco. It was made by the team of Don Simpson and Bruckheimer who were coming off a big success with Flashdance.

== Reception ==
On Rotten Tomatoes, the film has a score of 14% based on reviews from 7 critics.

Vincent Canby of The New York Times called it "a good, romantic suspense film that, at its best, has some of the steaminess of Lawrence Kasdan's Body Heat, although a few important plot twists don't stand careful scrutiny."

The film was the only flop from Simpson and Bruckheimer in their early days. Simpson later dismissed director Stewart in an interview as "a man with nice hair. He should probably stick to writing."

Giorgio Moroder was nominated for the Golden Raspberry Award for Worst Musical Score for his contributions to the film's soundtrack along with his soundtrack for the 1984 re-issue of Metropolis at the 5th Golden Raspberry Awards.

== Home media ==
Thief of Hearts was released on DVD on April 16, 2002. The DVD release is heavily edited, especially the gun range scene.
