= Kathy Troutt =

Model, actress, scuba diver and dolphin trainer

- Born: 14 September 1947 (age 79); Bath, Somerset, England
- Occupation: Actress

Kathy Troutt (born 14 September 1947) is an English-born model, actress, deep sea diver and dolphin trainer who moved to Australia in 1948.

== Diving career ==
At age 16 Kathy Troutt made the Guinness Book of Records for the deepest female deep sea scuba dive, breathing ordinary air from a tank, to a depth of 320 feet (97.5 m) off Sydney Harbour with former Royal Australian Navy Clearance Diver and decorated Korean War veteran Wally Reynolds. Kathy dived on Sydney Harbour shipwrecks in 1965.

== Modeling and acting career ==
Sports clothes and glamour model throughout the 1960s, she appeared on Skippy the Bush Kangaroo (as herself) as a visiting marine biologist. Troutt appeared in the documentary Mermaids in Paradise, released to television and cinemas in 1965 by Ben Cropp.

== Dolphin training ==
She worked in pantomime London, England, where she trained dolphins for movies. She was spotted by a representative of director Mike Nichols, where she was to train a dolphin for the feature film The Day of the Dolphin.

Troutt was later hired for similar work for the feature film The Blue Lagoon, in which she also played the body double for Brooke Shields.

This was followed by work as a crew member on Return to the Blue Lagoon and several other feature films later produced in Australia and Asia.
