= Henry de Vere Stacpoole =

British writer (1863–1951)

- Stacpoole, c. 1916
- Born: 9 April 1863; Kingstown (now Dún Laoghaire), Ireland
- Died: 12 April 1951 (aged 88); Shanklin, Isle of Wight, England
- Spouses: Margaret Ann Robson (m. 1907; died 1934); Florence Robson (m. 1938)
- Relatives: Florence Stacpoole (sister)
- Writing career
- Years active: 1894–1949
- Notable work: The Blue Lagoon

Henry de Vere Stacpoole (9 April 1863 – 12 April 1951) was an Irish author. His 1908 romance novel The Blue Lagoon has been adapted into multiple films. He published using his own name and sometimes the pseudonym Tyler de Saix.

== Biography ==
Stacpoole was born in Kingstown —today's Dún Laoghaire— in Dublin, on 9 April 1863; he was the last son of the Reverend William Church Stacpoole, a theologian and principal of Kingstown School, and Charlotte Augusta (née Mountjoy). He had three older sisters: the eldest was Florence Stacpoole, who wrote books and pamphlets on health and medicine. Henry attributed his love for nature; which characterized his entire existence, to the influence of his mother. She was of Irish origin but had spent her childhood until the age of twelve in the wildest and most wooded regions of Canada. Reverend William died prematurely in 1870 and the mother decided to return to Ireland where she raised her four children alone. Due to breathing problems that were misdiagnosed, in the winter of 1871, the family moved for a long stay in Southern France, at Nice.

At Portarlington Boarding School in Ireland, 100 miles from Kingstown, he received his education. It was not a joyful experience; in the autobiographical Men and Mice he wrote about the fact that his noisy and rough companions abused him physically and mentally, making him feel like "a little [King] Arthur in a cage of baboons." One night he fled through an adjacent girls' school, but his older sister dragged him back to boarding school.

After moving his family to London, he enrolled at Malvern College in Worcestershire, a progressive school that finally met his expectations. Despite being more drawn to literature than anatomy classes, he studied medicine at St George's and St Mary's hospitals and became a doctor in 1891. He practised only sporadically, initially as a doctor aboard a layout ship.

As a young man he befriended Pearl Craigie (known as John Oliver Hobbes) and this facilitated his first publication, a poem about Belgravia. In 1890 he met Aubrey Beardsley, Alfred Noyes, and other writers and artists of the Yellow Book group. This environment influenced his first novel, The Intended (1894), a tragic novel about two look-alikes, one rich and the other poor, who exchange places for fun; but it had very little success. Years later, Stacpoole retold this story in The Man Who Lost Himself (1918); a penniless American who impersonates his rich lookalike in England; and this time it was a commercial success.

His second, Pierrot! (1896), is set during the Franco-Prussian War and deals with an ambiguous relationship between a French boy and his look-alike psychic double, in the form of a Prussian officer; all through a story of "family curses" from which it appears that the young Frenchman may be a parricide. Hobbes recommended a lighter approach to the subject.

Pierrot was followed by Death, the Knight, and the Lady (1897), a powerful mix of reincarnation, disguise, and uxoricide. The originality of the themes and the development was beyond doubt, but the audience was certainly not prepared. These novels, and The Rapin (1899), all failed commercially.

In these early works Stacpoole develops his vision of existence for which the body is a "shell" – "chrysalis" he often says in these texts – waiting for a potential "charmer" that allows him to "divide", so that this existence can be shared by several bodies.

In the summer of 1898, Stacpoole practised as a country doctor in Somerset and wrote The Doctor (1899), a novel about English village life centred on an old doctor and a niece French who comes to upset his routine. Stacpoole considered this his best work, but at this time his public and critical success was very modest.

By the early 1900s, Stacpoole had become a permanent professional writer; in an interview, he claimed that he wrote 2000 words a day and that his main sources of inspiration were Edgar Allan Poe, Victor Hugo, Eugène Sue, and Robert Louis Stevenson.

He would be spared the "storm of success" for another seven years, during which time he published seven books, including a collection of children's stories and two novels in collaboration with his friend William Alexander Bryce. In 1904 he enlisted the assistance of the Royal Literary Fund based on the fact that sciatica and depression prevented him from writing.

Public success came, however, in 1905 with a comic-romantic novel, Fanny Lambert, and in 1907 with a sea adventure, Crimson Azaleas; in the latter two rude sailors adopt a Japanese orphan. He also wrote articles and novels for periodicals, particularly for the Daily Express.

Still practising as a doctor, on 17 December 1907 he married Margaret Ann Robson, at St Stephen's Church, Westbourne Park. At that time he lived at Eden Vue, Langtivathby, Cumberland, where he practised medicine. After the wedding, the couple moved to Stebbing, Essex, where Stacpoole met H.G. Wells and served as a magistrate.

Stacpoole's greatest commercial success came in 1908 with The Blue Lagoon, which was reprinted at least twenty-four times in thirteen years, and from which films were released in 1923, now lost, then 1949 and 1980. The Blue Lagoon is the story of two cousins, Dicky and Emmeline Lestrange, stranded on a remote island with a beautiful lagoon. They are raised by corpulent sailor Paddy Button, who drinks until he dies at two and a half years. After seeing the sailor's corpse, the children flee to another part of Palm Tree Island, terrified and confused. Fall in love after five years. Sex and birth are as mysterious to them as death, but they instinctively copulate and conceive. Her son was born when fifteen-year-old Emmeline lost consciousness in the jungle and woke up to find a boy on the ground. In Stacpoole's gender-reversal tradition, the Lestranges call the child Hannah and live happily ever after until they are unexpectedly expelled from their tropical Eden. The novel shows their mating as natural and outside Edwardian moral, religious, and social norms. The novel's timely focus on childhood, return-to-Eden natural life, and sex stand out.

The Blue Lagoon is part of a genre that focuses on childhood and fantasy from a psychological and sentimental perspective. This genre became popular during the Edwardian era, thanks to the success of books such as The Wonderful Wizard of Oz by L. Frank Baum, Peter Pan by J. M. Barrie, and The Blue Bird by Maurice Maeterlinck. He was also influenced by Lewis Carroll's Alice's Adventures in Wonderland and the Book of Genesis.

The Blue Lagoon is believed to have sparked a trend of island-themed novels in popular fiction. However, the author of the novel expressed his dissatisfaction with the trend due to copyright infringement. The book also had a notable impact on Edgar Rice Burroughs' Tarzan of the Apes. Although Stacpoole initially had no intention of writing sequels, he eventually authored two additional books: The Garden of God (1923) and The Gates of Morning (1925). These three novels were later compiled and published in The Blue Lagoon Omnibus in 1933.

In August 1920, the theatrical adaptation of The Blue Lagoon, written by Norman MacOwan and Charlton Mann, premiered at the Prince of Wales Theatre. The stage version was met with critical acclaim and enjoyed a successful eight-month run, captivating audiences with its captivating storyline and dynamic characters. However, the adaptation was not without its challenges. A significant hurdle that the production team had to overcome was a rights dispute with the original publisher, T. Fisher Unwin, which caused a lengthy delay of 12 years from the novel's release to the debut of the stage adaptation. Despite this setback, the play eventually made its way to the stage, where it proved to be a smash hit, delighting audiences with its captivating plot and enchanting characters.

After the success of The Blue Lagoon, Stacpoole's fame and recognition skyrocketed. Throughout his extensive career, he authored more than sixty books, predominantly in the fiction genre. His literary work gained widespread popularity in North America, with numerous translations in major European languages. Moreover, his books were repeatedly reprinted for four to five decades, attesting to his enduring popularity. Stacpoole's written works explored diverse settings, encompassing ancient Athens, Iceland, the Greek islands, and France, among others. This variety of locations is indicative of his lifelong passion for travel, which he developed during his childhood years.

He published some works under the pseudonym Tyler de Saix, including The Vulture's Prey (1909). A moving depiction of Belgian atrocities in the Congo, The Pools of Silence (1910), was the result of a trip to Africa; after reading this work Sir Arthur Conan Doyle was induced to organize a conference to discuss these atrocities and make them as public as possible.

During World War I Stacpoole and his wife left Stebbing and moved to Astle House, Castle Hedingham. Shortly before 1920, they moved to London; his neighbour was the scholar Arthur S. Way, who induced him to undertake the translation of Sappho's poems. He moved to Cliff Dene, Bonchurch, Isle of Wight, in November 1922; the description of these places is in The Story of My Village (1947). We also have the same setting in Goblin Market (1925), a delicate social and psychological novel starring a middle-aged man. In 1922 Stacpoole published several volumes of verse, including his translations of Sappho and François Villon (of whom he also wrote a popular biography). After Margaret died in 1934, he gave the village of Bonchurch a pond and a bird "sanctuary" in her memory. On 21 March 1938, he married Margaret's sister, Florence Robson. He had no children from either marriage.

Due to his deep love and appreciation for nature, he established the Penguin Club, which was dedicated to protecting seabirds from the harmful effects of oil. This cause had been close to his heart since the 1920s, and he continued to actively pursue it throughout his life. Despite being known for his romantic treasure hunt stories, Stacpoole also wrote two captivating memoirs, Men and Mice (1942) and More Men and Mice (1945), which showcased his sentimental side.

Stacpoole was a robust and tall man, with a cheerful character. Along with Conan Doyle, he believed in the existence of fairies after the Cottingley fairy incident in the 1920s, when fairies were apparently photographed by two young girls named Elsie and Frances.

He died due to cerebral thrombosis after an operation in hospital at Shanklin, Isle of Wight, on 12 April 1951. He was laid to rest at St Boniface Church, Bonchurch.

== Works ==
=== Novels ===
==== The Blue Lagoon series of novels ====
- The Blue Lagoon (1908)
  - The Garden of God (1923) (sequel to The Blue Lagoon)
  - The Gates of Morning (1925) (sequel to The Garden of God)
- The Girl of the Golden Reef: A Romance of the Blue Lagoon (1929)
- The Blue Lagoon Omnibus (1933)

==== Other novels ====
- The Intended (1894)
- Pierrot! (1895)
- Death, the Knight, and the Lady: A Ghost Story (1897)
- The Doctor: A Study from Life (1899)
- The Rapin (1899). Republished as Toto: A Parisian Sketch (1910).
- The Bourgeois (1901)
- The Lady-Killer (1902)
- Fanny Lambert (1906)
- The Golden Astrolabe, co-authored by W. A. Bryce (1906).
- The Meddler: A Novel of Sorts, co-authored by W. A. Bryce (1907).
- The Crimson Azaleas: A Novel (1908)
- The Cottage on the Fells (1908). Republished as Murder on the Fell (1937)
- Patsy (1908)
- The Reavers: A Tale of Wild Adventure on the Moors of Lorne, co-authored by W. A. Bryce (1908)
- The Man Without a Head, using the pseudonym Tyler De Saix (1908)
- The Vulture's Prey, using the pseudonym Tyler De Saix (1908)
- Garryowen: The Romance of a Race-Horse (1909)
- The Pools of Silence (1909)
- The Cruise of the King Fisher: A Tale of Deep-Sea Adventure (1910)
- The Drums of War (1910)
- The Ship of Coral: A Tropical Romance (1911)
- The Order of Release (1912)
- The Street of the Flute-Player: A Romance (1912)
- Molly Beamish (1913)
- Bird Cay (1913)
- The Children of the Sea: A Romance (1913)
- Father O'Flynn (1914)
- Monsieur de Rochefort: A Romance of Old Paris (1914), published in the US as The Presentation (1914)
- The New Optimism (1914)
- The Pearl Fishers (1915)
- The Red Day (fictional diary) (1915)
- The Reef of Stars: A Romance of the Tropics (1916), published in the US as The Gold Trail (1916)
- Corporal Jacques of the Foreign Legion (1916)
- Sea Plunder (1917)
- The Starlit Garden (1917), published in the US as The Ghost Girl (1918)
- The Willow Tree: The Romance of a Japanese Garden (1918)
- The Man Who Lost Himself (1918)
- The Beach of Dreams: A Story of the True World (1919)
- Uncle Simon, co-authored by Margaret Stacpoole (1920), published in the US as The Man Who Found Himself (1920)
- Satan: A Story of the Sea King's Country (1921)
- Satan: A Romance of the Bahamas (1921), filmed as The Truth About Spring (1965)
- Vanderdecken: The Story of a Man (1922)
- Golden Ballast (1924)
- The House of Crimson Shadows (1925)
- The City in the Sea (1925)
- The Mystery of Uncle Bollard (1927)
- Goblin Market (1927)
- Roxanne (1928), published in the US as The Return of Spring (1928)
- Eileen of the Trees (1929)
- The Chank Shell (1930), published in the US as The Island of Lost Women (1930).
- Pacific Gold (1931)
- Love on the Adriatic (1932)
- The Lost Caravan (1932)
- Mandarin Gardens (1933)
- The Naked Soul: The Story of a Modern Knight (1933)
- The Longshore Girl (1935)
- The Sunstone (1936)
- Ginger Adams (1937)
- High-Yaller (1938)
- Due East of Friday (1939)
- An American at Oxford (1941)
- Oxford Goes to War (1943)
- Harley Street (1946)
- The Story of My Village (1947)
- The Land of Little Horses. A Story (1949)
- The Man in Armour (1949)

=== Story collections ===
- Poppyland (1914)
- The Blue Horizon: Romance from the Tropics and the Sea (1915)
- In Blue Waters (1917)
- Under Blue Skies (1919)
- A Man of the Islands (1920)
- Men, Women, and Beasts (1922)
- Ocean Tramps (1924)
- Stories East and West: Tales of Men and Women (1926)
- Tropic Love (1928)
- The Tales of Mynheer Amayat (1930)
- The Vengeance of Mynheer Van Lok and Other Stories (1934)
- Green Coral (1935)
- Old Sailors Never Lie and Other Tales of Land and Sea by One of Them (1938)

=== Poetry ===
- Poems and Ballads (1910)
- The North Sea and Other Poems (1915)
- In a Bonchurch Garden: Poems and Translations (1937)

=== Autobiography ===
- Men and Mice (1942)
- More Men and Mice (1945)

=== Biography ===
- François Villon: His Life and Times, 1431-1463 (literary biography) (1916)

=== Translations ===
- The Poems of François Villon (1913)
- Sappho: A New Rendering (1920)

== Adaptations of Stacpoole's books ==
=== Stage ===
- The Blue Lagoon by Norman MacOwan and Charlton Mann (1920)

=== Motion pictures ===
- Garryowen (1920)
- The Man Who Lost Himself (1920)
- Beach of Dreams (1921)
- The Blue Lagoon (1923)
- The Starlit Garden (1923)
- The Reef of Stars (1923)
- Satan's Sister (1925)
- The Man Who Lost Himself (1941)
- The Blue Lagoon (1949)
- The Truth About Spring (1965)
- The Blue Lagoon (1980)
- Return to the Blue Lagoon (1991)
- Blue Lagoon: The Awakening (2012)
