= Return to the Blue Lagoon =

1991 film by William A. Graham

- Theatrical release poster
- Directed by: William A. Graham
- Screenplay by: Leslie Stevens
- Based on: The Garden of God by Henry De Vere Stacpoole
- Produced by: William A. Graham
- Starring: Milla Jovovich; Brian Krause
- Cinematography: Robert Steadman
- Edited by: Ronald J. Fagan
- Music by: Basil Poledouris
- Production company: Price Entertainment
- Distributed by: Columbia Pictures
- Release date: August 2, 1991
- Running time: 102 minutes
- Country: United States
- Language: English
- Budget: $11 million
- Box office: $2.8 million

Return to the Blue Lagoon is a 1991 American South Seas romantic adventure film directed and produced by William A. Graham and starring Milla Jovovich and Brian Krause. The film is a sequel to The Blue Lagoon (1980), which was a fairly close adaptation of the 1908 novel The Blue Lagoon by Henry De Vere Stacpoole. The screenplay by Leslie Stevens used some basic elements from the sequel novels The Garden of God (1923) and The Gates of Morning (1925) and even from an earlier film adaptation of The Blue Lagoon (1949), but the film was more a remake than a sequel. The original music score was written, composed and performed by Basil Poledouris. The film's closing theme song, "A World of Our Own", is performed by Surface featuring Bernard Jackson. The music was written by Barry Mann, and the lyrics were written by Cynthia Weil.

The film tells the story of Lilli Hargrave and Richard Lestrange Jr., two young children marooned on a tropical island paradise in the South Pacific, who grow to maturity and fall in love. The film was a box-office bomb compared to the first film, grossing just $2.8 million on an $11 million budget. Like its predecessor, it was panned by critics, receiving an approval rating of 0% on Rotten Tomatoes.

== Plot ==
Set in the South Pacific Ocean in the year 1897, beginning right where the original film left off, a ship finds a little dinghy with three passengers. They quickly find out that the two adults, Richard and Emmeline Lestrange, are dead, but the infant snuggled between them lives—a little two-year-old boy whom they assume is named Richard since that is the only name he knows. After being taken aboard, the baby is given over to the care of Mrs. Sarah Hargrave, a widow who already has a young daughter named Lilli. After the crew is infected with cholera, Sarah, Lilli and Richard are cast off from the ship. After days afloat, Kearney, a sailor who has been sent with them, tries to kill Richard owing to his excessive crying. Sarah madly beats Kearney to death with a harpoon and dumps his body overboard.

Sarah, Lilli and Richard arrive on a tropical island. Sarah tries to raise them to be civilized, as the orphaned boy Richard was born and raised by Richard Sr. and Emmeline on this same island. They grow up, and Sarah educates them from the Bible as well as from her own knowledge. She cautiously demands the children never go to the forbidden side of the island.

Eight years later, when Richard and Lilli are 10 and 8 years old, Sarah dies from pneumonia, leaving them to fend for themselves. She is buried on a promontory overlooking the tidal reef area. Together, the kids survive on their resourcefulness and the bounty of their remote paradise.

Six years later, Richard and Lilli grow into strong teenagers. They live in a house on the beach and spend their days fishing, swimming, and exploring the island. Richard lets Lilli win the child's game of Easter egg hunt and dives to find her an adult's pearl as a reward. His penchant for racing a lagoon shark sparks a quarrel; Lilli thinks he is foolhardy, but the liveliness makes Richard feel virile.

One day, Lilli awakens with her first menstrual period, just as Sarah told her. Richard awakens with an erection and suffers a nasty mood swing, which he cannot explain. They then get into an argument regarding privacy and Sarah's rules. One night, Richard goes off to the forbidden side of the island, and discovers that a group of natives from another island use the shrine of a Kon-Tiki-like idol to sacrifice conquered enemies every full moon. Despite a lone native spotting him, Richard hides in the mud and manages to escape unharmed. After making up for their fight, Richard and Lilli discover natural love and passion, which deepen their emotional bond. They fall in love and exchange formal wedding vows and rings in the middle of the jungle. They consummate their new-found feelings for each other for the next few months.

Soon after, a ship arrives at the island, carrying unruly sailors, the proud captain Jacob Hilliard and his spoiled daughter Sylvia. The party is welcomed by Lilli and Richard, who ask to be taken back to civilization. Sylvia tries to seduce Richard, but as tempted as he is by her, he realizes that Lilli is his heart and soul, upsetting Sylvia. Richard angrily leaves Sylvia behind in the middle of the fishpond, in plain view of the landing party. Meanwhile, Quinlan, a sailor, ogles Lilli in her bath and drags her back to the house. He tries to rape her and steal her pearl before Richard comes to her rescue. Quinlan opens fire on Richard, who flees. Richard lures Quinlan to his death in the jaws of the shark in the tidal reef area.

Upon returning, Richard apologizes to Lilli for hurting her, and she reveals that she is pregnant. She tells him that if he wants to leave, then she will not stop him, but that she wants to raise their child away from civilization and away from guns. They decide to stay and raise their child on the island, as they feel their blissful life would not compare to civilization. The ship departs and the two young lovers stay on the island and have their baby, a girl.

== Cast ==
- Milla Jovovich as Lilli Hargrave
  - Courtney Phillips as Young Lilli Hargrave
  - Emma James as Baby Lilli Hargrave
- Brian Krause as Richard 'Paddy' Lestrange Jr.
  - Garette Ratliff Henson as Young Richard 'Paddy' Lestrange Jr.
  - Jackson Barton as Baby Richard 'Paddy' Lestrange Jr.
- Lisa Pelikan as Sarah Hargrave
- Nana Coburn as Sylvia Hilliard
- Brian Blain as Captain Jacob Hilliard
- Peter Hehir as Quinlan
- Alexander Petersons as Giddens
- John Mann as First Captain
- Wayne Pygram as Kearney
- John Dicks as Penfield
- Gus Mercurio as First Mate

== Production ==
A sequel to the 1980 film version of The Blue Lagoon had been in the works since at least 1982; however, a battle over the rights to the novel between Columbia Pictures and the estate of Henry de Vere Stacpoole, who controlled the rights to the novel outside the United States, (Note: Henry De Vere Stacpoole died in 1951 and the copyright to his work including The Blue Lagoon only expired on December 31, 2021 in the country of first publishing, Great Britain.) delayed the development of a sequel. Because of this, the project remained in limbo until December 1989, when Randal Kleiser told the Long Beach Press-Telegram that the screenplay was nearing completion and photography would begin in 1990. However, Kleiser would be unavailable to direct, as he would be in Alaska filming White Fang but intended to act as executive producer in association with Frank Price. The film was shot on location in Australia and Taveuni, Fiji.

== Soundtrack ==
Return to the Blue Lagoon (Original Motion Picture Soundtrack)

Film score by Basil Poledouris
- Released: 1991
- Genre: Soundtrack
- Length: 74:18

Return to the Blue Lagoon (Original Motion Picture Soundtrack)
No.	Title	Length
1.	"Legend and Main Titles"	2:48
2.	"Dinghy Adrift"	1:52
3.	"Cholera Scare"	1:29
4.	"Night Sailing"	0:47
5.	"Sarah Sails Alone"	5:00
6.	"Richard's Toy Boat"	1:00
7.	"After the Storm"	3:51
8.	"Sarah Reacts To Distant Drumming"	1:25
9.	"Hog Play"	0:50
10.	"Water Play"	1:06
11.	"Shark on The Reef"	2:53
12.	"The Children Pray"	2:11
13.	"The Easter Egg Hunt (Alternate)"	1:06
14.	"Richard Dives For Pearl (Alternate)"	0:51
15.	"Richard Looks At Lilli"	1:57
16.	"Richard Spies (Original)"	1:04
17.	"Richard vs. Shark On Reef"	0:43
18.	"I'll Move My Bed"	0:45
19.	"First Menstruation"	0:22
20.	"Richard Enters Jungle (Revised)"	1:42
21.	"Love Montage"	2:53
22.	"Ship To Shore"	1:24
23.	"Water Cask Work Party"	1:49
24.	"Lilli Is Jealous"	2:17
25.	"Evil Quinlan And Fight Sequence"	5:20
26.	"Lilli Pregnant"	1:39
27.	""A World Of Our Own" (Surface)"	4:47
28.	"THE EXTRAS - ALTERNATES AND ADDITIONAL CUES: The Easter Egg Hunt (Original)"	1:04
29.	"Richard Dives For Pearl (Original)"	0:51
30.	"Richard Spies (Revised)"	1:09
31.	"Richard vs. Shark On Reef (Alternate)"	0:41
32.	"8M1"	0:19
33.	"Richard Enters Jungle (Original)"	1:41
34.	"Beach Meeting"	0:29
35.	"Quinlan Spots Pearl (Original)"	0:12
36.	"Quinlan Spots Pearl (Alternate)"	0:14
37.	"THE EXTRAS - CANNIBAL DRUMMING SOURCE: Distant Cannibal Drumming"	0:56
38.	"Distant Drumming Continues"	1:35
39.	"Distant Drumming Continues (Alternate)"	1:03
40.	"Distant Drumming Continues (Irregular)"	1:45
41.	"Out Of Rhythm Drums"	2:29
42.	"Distant Drumming"	1:22
43.	"Distant Drumming (Alternate No. 1)"	1:11
44.	"Distant Drumming (Alternate No. 2)"	1:37
45.	"Cannibal Party Drums No. 1"	0:54
46.	"Cannibal Party Drums No. 2"	0:55
Total length:		74:18

== Reception ==
=== Box office ===
Return to the Blue Lagoon was a box-office bomb; on a budget of $11 million ($26 million in 2025), it made less than $3 million in the United States.

=== Critical response ===
The film received even worse reviews than its predecessor. On review aggregator Rotten Tomatoes, the film has a rare approval rating of 0% based on 30 reviews and an average rating of 2.7/10. The site's consensus reads: "Despite its lush tropical scenery and attractive leads, Return to the Blue Lagoon is as ridiculous as its predecessor, and lacks the prurience and unintentional laughs that might make it a guilty pleasure". On Metacritic, the film has a weighted average score of 28 out of 100, based on 17 critics, indicating "generally unfavorable reviews". Audiences surveyed by CinemaScore gave the film a grade of "B" on scale of A+ to F.

== Nominations ==
1991 Golden Raspberry Awards
Nominee: Worst Picture – William A. Graham
Nominee: Worst Director – William A. Graham
Nominee: Worst New Star – Milla Jovovich
Nominee: Worst New Star – Brian Krause
Nominee: Worst Screenplay – Leslie Stevens
Young Artist Awards
Nominee: Best Young Actress Starring in a Motion Picture – Milla Jovovich

== Home media ==
The film was released on VHS on February 5, 1992 and on DVD on November 5, 2002. The film was also made available for streaming through various services.

== See also ==
- List of films with a 0% rating on Rotten Tomatoes
- The Blue Lagoon, 1923 version, now lost
- The Blue Lagoon, 1949 version
- The Blue Lagoon, 1980 version
- Blue Lagoon: The Awakening, a Lifetime television movie
- Paradise
- Friends
- Paul et Virginie, the inspiration for The Blue Lagoon
- State of nature
- Second weekend in box office performance § Second-weekend drop
