= Blue Lagoon: The Awakening =

2012 television film directed by Mikael Salomon

- DVD cover
- Genre: Romance; Teen
- Based on: The Blue Lagoon by H. Devere Stacpoole
- Teleplay by: Matt Heller; Heather Rutman
- Directed by: Mikael Salomon; Jake Newsome
- Starring: Indiana Evans; Brenton Thwaites; Denise Richards; Patrick St. Esprit; Frank John Hughes; Alix Elizabeth Gitter; Carrie Wampler; Hayley Kiyoko; Aimee Carrero; Annie Tedesco; Christopher Atkins
- Music by: Tree Adams
- Country of origin: United States
- Original language: English

Production
- Executive producers: Craig Zadan; Neil Meron; Judith Verno
- Producers: Kyle Clark; Nellie Nugiel
- Cinematography: Denis Lenoir; Roy Wagner
- Editor: Josh Beal
- Running time: 89 minutes
- Production companies: PeaceOut Productions; Silver Screen Pictures; Sony Pictures Television; Storyline Entertainment

Original release
- Network: Lifetime
- Release: June 16, 2012

Blue Lagoon: The Awakening is a 2012 American romantic drama television film that premiered on Lifetime on June 16, 2012. Indiana Evans and Brenton Thwaites star in the film, which is based on the 1908 novel The Blue Lagoon and its previous film adaptations.

It was a major departure from previous Blue Lagoon films in several respects. The setting is contemporary, whereas the previous films were all set in the Victorian era; the lead characters were raised in normal society and are marooned as teenagers, rather than growing up on the island; the island the main characters are stranded on is in the Caribbean, whereas the previous films took place in the Pacific Ocean; and roughly equal time is devoted to the uncivilized world of the island and the human society the characters were born into. Christopher Atkins, the male lead in the 1980 film The Blue Lagoon, also appears in the film.

== Plot ==
Two high school students, Emma and Dean, are on a class trip to Trinidad to help build a school for less fortunate children. Emma, a popular star pupil, has her life plans set out. Steven Sullivan, the high school quarterback, flirts with Emma, though she is instead interested in Dean, a loner who routinely gets into trouble and seldom socializes since his mother's death. After Dean's knife is confiscated, his father pulls strings to get his son back on the trip.

On their second night in Trinidad, Dean and Emma separately attend a boat party, where she sees Steven kissing another girl. During the party, Emma falls overboard when police arrive in a surprise raid. Dean jumps into the water and helps her into a dinghy. Wanting to avoid getting into trouble, he severs the line attaching the dinghy to the boat, only to discover there is no motor.

The two drift to an island, avoiding dangerous rocks, with the dinghy's sole paddle. After discovering the island is deserted, they find the outgoing tide has washed away the dinghy. Unsure if they will be rescued, Emma and Dean must rely on each other for survival. Together, they learn to build a fire, fish, and find food.

At first, they are friends, but eventually their bond evolves into a romantic relationship. Dean's father, Jack, and Emma's parents, Barbara and Phil arrive in Trinidad. Emma reveals that her parents have predetermined her future without her ever questioning it. After an extensive search, the Trinidad government officially ends the effort. Phil returns home, while Jack and Barbara both keep searching, and he hires a private rescue attempt.

When Dean and Emma find a human skeleton, he calms the upset Emma by kissing her. They give in to their growing feelings by having sex. The morning after their sexual encounter, Emma finds Dean digging a grave for the skeleton. When questioned, he becomes irritable, but eventually admits he was hoping for closure over his mother's death, suffering guilt for inadvertently causing her fatal accident.

With no trace of Emma or Dean being found, Jack and Barbara can no longer neglect their individual responsibilities and both return home. As Emma and Dean's sexual relations continue, they share further intimate details, including a mutual desire to have children, but the difficulty of life on the island and concern about her family are putting a strain on Emma.

After being stranded for over 100 days, Emma and Dean are rescued by a tourist helicopter. They are met by family, friends, and the media. Emma is thrust into a more popular position at school while Dean, still a semi-outcast, avoids approaching her in public. Readjusting to everyday life, their relationship becomes strained and distant.

Emma attends the prom, while Dean only goes because his father encouraged him. She spots him outside watching her through the window. Emma's friend, Lizzie, encourages her to go to him. Emma and Dean kiss passionately and then dance together, while resuming their relationship as a couple.

== Cast ==
- Indiana Evans as Emmaline "Emma" Robinson
- Brenton Thwaites as Dean McMullen
- Denise Richards as Barbara Robinson, Emma's mother
- Patrick St. Esprit as Jack McMullen, Dean's widowed father
- Frank John Hughes as Phil Robinson, Emma's father
- Alix Elizabeth Gitter as Lizzie, one of Emma's friends
- Carrie Wampler as Stacey Robinson, Emma's younger sister
- Hayley Kiyoko as Helen, one of Emma's friends
- Aimee Carrero as Jude, one of Emma's friends
- Annie Tedesco as Ms. Collier, a teacher on the trip
- Christopher Atkins as Mr. Christiansen, a teacher on the trip

== Production ==
The film had been in development since 2004, with Heather Rutman and Matt Heller as writers. The film went into production in 2011 with plans to film in Puerto Rico in February.

Male lead Brenton Thwaites recounted that he had never heard of the Blue Lagoon films before, and upon being cast he watched the previous two films for research, though he admitted that he could not bring himself to watch Return to the Blue Lagoon in its entirety.

During filming of the scenes in the lagoon, Thwaites and co-star Indiana Evans were so cold that they could not talk properly, necessitating that automated dialogue replacement be applied to these scenes.

Production began in California and later moved to the island of Maui in Hawaii.

== Reception ==
Blue Lagoon: The Awakening received more mixed reviews than the previous two films in the franchise, but was often compared favorably to the critically reviled 1980 film. On Metacritic the film has an approval rating of 51 out of 100 based on reviews from 5 critics, indicating "mixed or average" reviews.

Linda Stasi commented in the New York Post, "Unlike the original where nudie scenes were followed by fornicating turtles (kill me!), here their 'awakening' is tastefully done with nothing much showing except their emotions." She assessed the film overall as silly but enjoyable. Rob Owen of the Pittsburgh Post-Gazette cited the lack of physical explicitness in the sex scenes as a major weak point of the film, and said the ending was "particularly weak and nonsensical". Mike Hale of The New York Times thought the film was a guilty pleasure, and commented that "the new film lacks the glowing cinematography of Néstor Almendros, who was nominated for an Oscar for The Blue Lagoon. But under the direction of Mikael Salomon and Jake Newsome, The Awakening offers occasional honest moments of humor and adolescent angst: Ms. Evans and Mr. Thwaites are in their early 20s and better actors than Ms. Shields and Mr. Atkins were in their teens." Will Harris of The A.V. Club was highly critical of the film, saying it failed to meet even his low expectations, "When a film manages to fail to live up to the low bar set for Blue Lagoon movies and Lifetime movies, you know you've got something really, really awful on your hands."

== See also ==
- Return to the Blue Lagoon
- The Blue Lagoon (1923 film)
- The Blue Lagoon (1949 film)
- The Blue Lagoon (1980 film)
