= In Blue Waters =

Collection of novellas and short stories

In Blue Waters is a collection of novellas and short stories by Henry De Vere Stacpoole, first published in 1917 by Hutchinson and Co., London.

The collection contains the following titles:

- "In Blue Waters"
- "The Luck of Captain Slocum"
- "The Mound of Darkness"
- "The Hero"
- "The Satin Shoe"
- "The Birth of Love"
- "The Valley of the Sword"
- "The Cormorant"
- "Pearl Island"
- "The Bloodstone"
- "Black Bass"
