= The Blue Lagoon (1980 film) =

American coming-of-age drama film by Randal Kleiser

- Theatrical release poster
- Directed by: Randal Kleiser
- Screenplay by: Douglas Day Stewart
- Based on: The Blue Lagoon by Henry De Vere Stacpoole
- Produced by: Randal Kleiser
- Starring: Brooke Shields; Christopher Atkins; Leo McKern; William Daniels
- Cinematography: Néstor Almendros
- Edited by: Robert Gordon
- Music by: Basil Poledouris
- Color process: Metrocolor
- Production company: Columbia Pictures
- Distributed by: Columbia Pictures
- Release date: June 20, 1980
- Running time: 105 minutes
- Country: United States
- Language: English
- Budget: $4.5 million
- Box office: $58.8 million (North America)

The Blue Lagoon is a 1980 American coming-of-age drama film directed by Randal Kleiser from a screenplay written by Douglas Day Stewart based on the 1908 novel of the same name by Henry De Vere Stacpoole. The film stars Brooke Shields and Christopher Atkins.

The film tells the story of a boy and a girl who live together in a tropical island paradise in the South Pacific after surviving a shipwreck. Without adult supervision or societal restrictions, the two navigate the emotional and physical changes of puberty, fall in love, and end up having a child.

The Blue Lagoon was theatrically released on June 20, 1980 by Columbia Pictures. The film was panned by critics, who disparaged its screenplay, its execution, and Shields' performance; however, Almendros' cinematography received praise. In spite of the criticism, the film was a commercial success, grossing $58.8 million on a $4.5 million budget and becoming the ninth-highest-grossing film of 1980 in North America. The film was nominated for the Saturn Award for Best Fantasy Film, the Academy Award for Best Cinematography for Almendros, and the Golden Globe Award for New Star of the Year – Actor for Atkins. Shields won the inaugural Golden Raspberry Award for Worst Actress for her work in the film.

== Plot ==
In the late Victorian period, two cousins, nine-year-old Richard and seven-year-old Emmeline Lestrange, and galley cook Paddy Button, are shipwrecked on a lush tropical island in the South Pacific. Paddy cares for the children and forbids them "by law" from going to the other side of the island, where he finds an altar with bloody remains from human sacrifices. He also warns them against eating any deadly scarlet berries. He dies after a drunken binge, and the children rebuild their home on a different part of the island.

Having reached puberty, the two go skinny dipping in the ocean, but Emmeline is uncomfortable with her sexual attraction to Richard and declines to share her "funny" thoughts with him. She is frightened by her first menstrual period and refuses to allow Richard to inspect her for what he imagines is a wound.

Eventually, Richard recognizes his attraction to Emmeline. She ventures to the forbidden side of the island and sees the altar. Associating the blood with Christ's crucifixion, she concludes that the altar is God and tries to persuade Richard to go to the other side of the island to pray with her. Richard is shocked at the idea of breaking the law and they argue. When Richard tries to initiate sexual contact with Emmeline, she rebuffs him. He hides from her and masturbates.

When a ship appears for the first time in years, Emmeline does not light the signal fire and the ship passes by without noticing them. When Richard confronts Emmeline about her failure, she asserts to his angry disbelief that the island is now their home and that they should remain there. Emmeline also reveals that she knows about Richard's masturbation and threatens to tell her Uncle Arthur about this. They fight and she throws a coconut at him, hitting him in the head by chance. Richard angrily slaps her and kicks her out of their shelter.

Emmeline steps on a venomous stonefish. Weak from the poison, she pleads with Richard to "take [her] to God". Richard carries her across the island and places her on the altar. Emmeline recovers and they swim naked in the lagoon. Noticing their bodies' reactions, they discover sexual intercourse and become lovers. Neither recognizes what is happening when Emmeline becomes pregnant, and they are stunned to feel the baby move inside her abdomen, assuming her stomach is causing the movements.

Months later, Richard observes indigenous people performing a human sacrifice in front of the statue. He becomes frightened and runs away to find Emmeline, whom he finds in labor. Emmeline gives birth to a baby boy, whom they name Paddy.

A ship led by Richard's father, Arthur, approaches the island and sees the family playing on the shore. Content with their lives, Richard and Emmeline walk away instead of signaling for help. Arthur assumes the mud-covered couple are not Richard and Emmeline.

Visiting their original homesite, Richard searches for bananas while Paddy, unnoticed, brings a branch of poisonous Abrus precatorius seeds into the boat with Emmeline. Paddy tosses an oar out of the boat as it drifts from the shore. Richard swims after them followed closely by a shark. Emmeline throws the other oar at the shark, striking it and giving Richard time to get into the boat. The boat drifts oarless out to sea.

After drifting for days, Richard and Emmeline wake up to find Paddy eating the Abrus precatorius seeds. Hopeless, Richard and Emmeline eat the seeds as well, and lie down to await death. Some hours later, Arthur's ship finds them. Arthur asks if they are dead, but an officer assures him they're simply asleep.

== Cast ==
- Brooke Shields as Emmeline Lestrange
  - Elva Josephson as Young Emmeline
- Christopher Atkins as Richard Lestrange
  - Glenn Kohan as Young Richard
- Bradley Pryce as Little Paddy Lestrange
  - Chad Timmermans as Infant Paddy
- Leo McKern as Paddy Button
- William Daniels as Arthur Lestrange
- Alan Hopgood as Captain
- Gus Mercurio as Officer

== Production ==
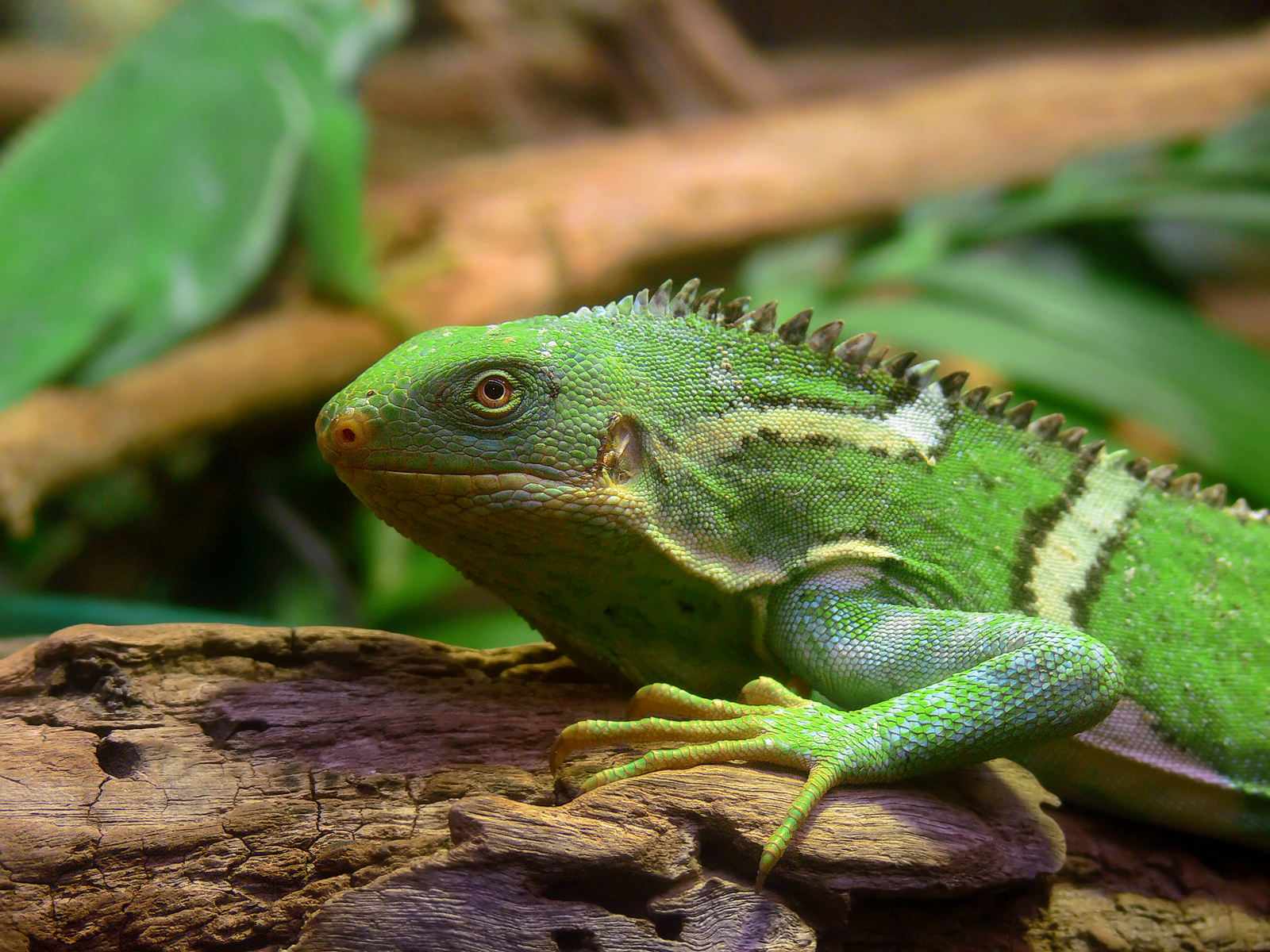
The Fiji crested iguana was documented by scientists with the help of The Blue Lagoon.

The film was a passion project of Randal Kleiser, who had long admired the original novel. He hired Douglas Day Stewart, who had written The Boy in the Plastic Bubble (1976), to write the script and met up with Richard Franklin, the Australian director, who was looking for work in Hollywood. This gave him the idea to use an Australian crew, which Franklin helped supervise.

=== Casting ===
Brooke Shields was cast as Emmeline Lestrange based on her performance in Pretty Baby (1978). Jodie Foster auditioned for the role of Emmeline Lestrange, but she was turned down. Kelly Preston also auditioned for the role. Diane Lane and Melissa Sue Anderson were offered the role but turned it down. Willie Aames was considered for the role of Richard Lestrange.

=== Filming ===
Principal photography of this film began on June 18, 1979, and it was shot at Nanuya Levu, a privately owned island in Fiji. The flora and fauna featured in the film includes an array of animals from multiple continents, including a species of iguana then unknown to Nanuya Levu. Herpetologist John Gibbons had just discovered said iguana on nearby Yadua Tabu, but word from an associate who had watched the film and spotted a strange lizard confirmed the existence of a second population. With credit to The Blue Lagoon, Gibbons described the Fiji crested iguana (Brachylophus vitiensis) in 1981.

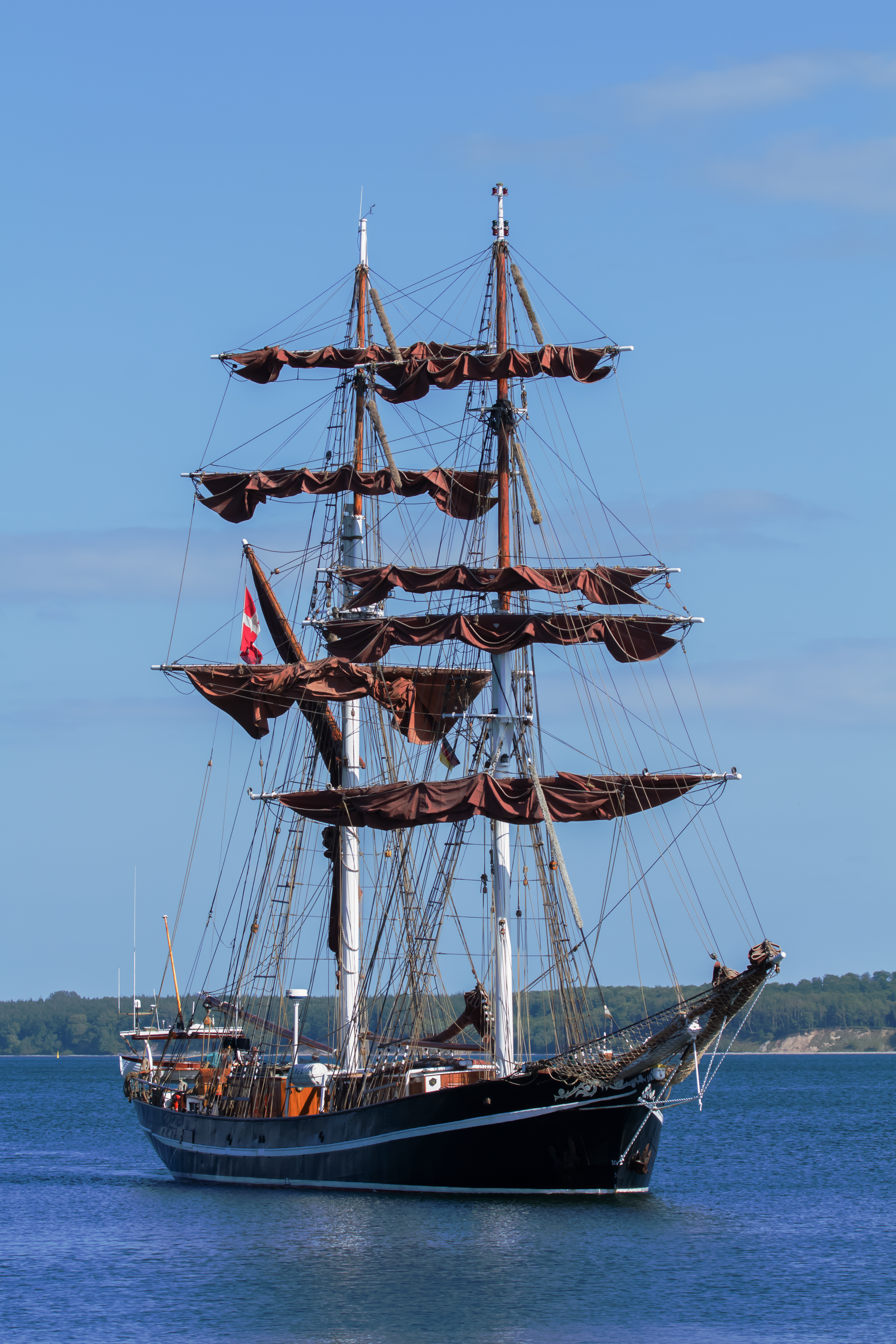
Eye of the Wind, the ship that sailed in the ocean during the movie The Blue Lagoon.

Shields was 14 years of age when she appeared in the film. All of her nude scenes were performed by the film's 32-year-old stunt coordinator, Kathy Troutt. Shields did many of her topless scenes with her hair glued to her breasts. Atkins was 18 when the movie was filmed, and he performed his own nude scenes (which included brief frontal nudity).

Underwater moving picture photography was performed by Ron Taylor and Valerie Taylor.

== Soundtrack ==
The Blue Lagoon (Original Motion Picture Soundtrack)

Film score by Basil Poledouris
- Released: 1980
- Genre: Soundtrack
- Length: 33:52

The Blue Lagoon (Original Motion Picture Soundtrack)
No.	Title	Length
1.	"Love Theme (Emmeline)"	2:31
2.	"Main Title"	2:35
3.	"Fire"	1:17
4.	"The Island"	1:43
5.	"The Sands of Time"	2:24
6.	"Paddy's Death"	1:18
7.	"The Children Grow"	4:09
8.	"Lord of the Lagoon"	1:04
9.	"Love Theme (Reprise)"	1:10
10.	"Underwater Courtship"	1:58
11.	"The Kiss"	2:33
12.	"Richard sees Paddy"	2:20
13.	"The Birth"	1:13
14.	"Bad People, Baby Swim"	2:59
15.	"The Memories"	1:18
16.	"3 Points to Port, End Credits"	3:20
Total length:		33:52

== Reception ==
=== Critical response ===
On Rotten Tomatoes, The Blue Lagoon holds an approval rating of 12% based on 26 reviews, with an average rating of 3.3/10. The website's critical consensus reads: "A piece of lovely dreck, The Blue Lagoon is a naughty fantasy that's also too chaste to be truly entertaining". On Metacritic, the film has a weighted average score of 31 out of 100, based on 14 critics, indicating "generally unfavorable reviews".

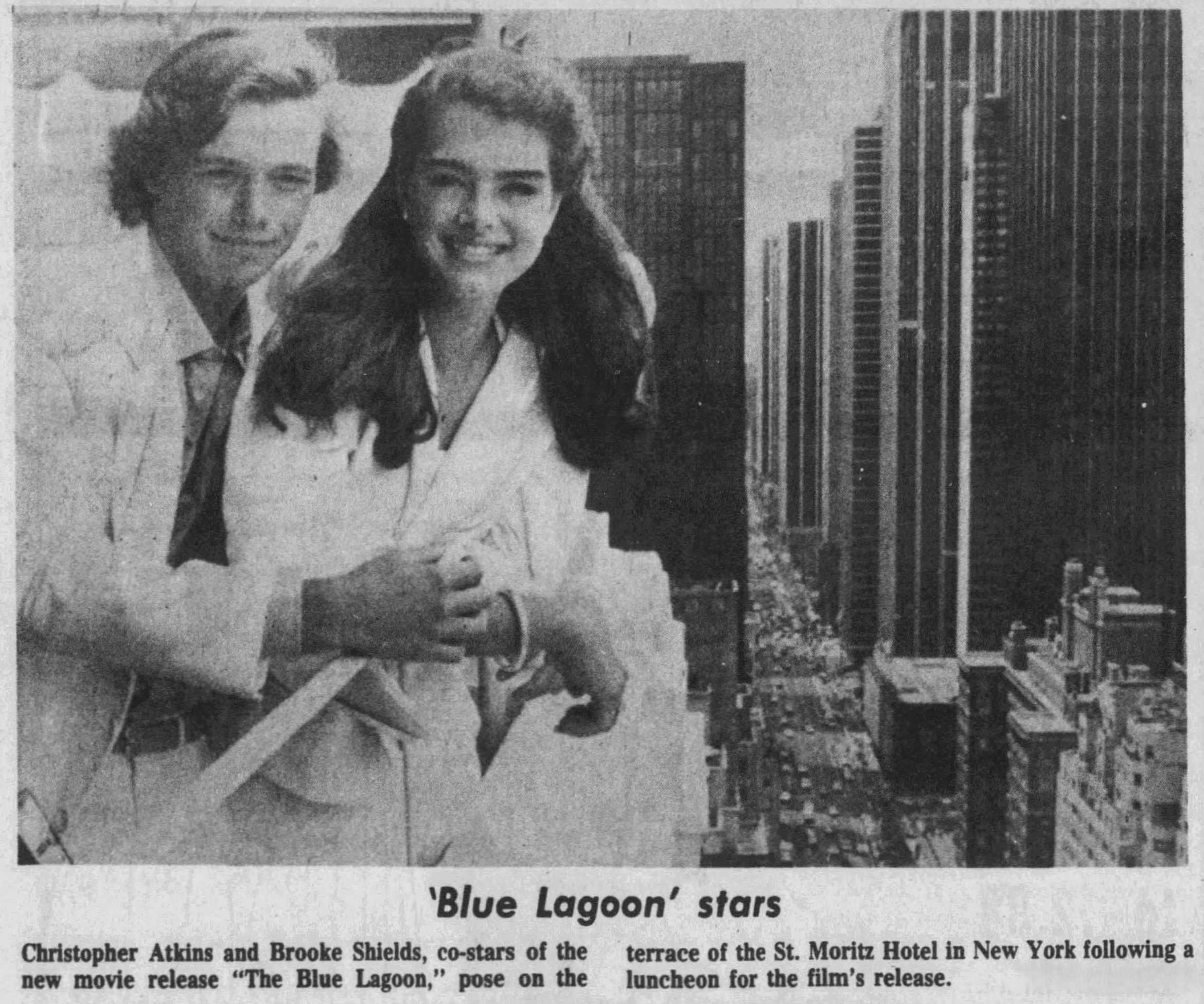
Newspaper clipping from June 1980

Critics of the film asserted that the film's portrayal of how young people would develop outside of civilized society was unrealistic and overly optimistic, that the film should not have built up the supposed threat posed by island natives who never even interact with the two main characters, and that the film was overly coy and restrained in its treatment of sexual matters. Roger Ebert gave the film 1½ stars out of 4, claiming that it "could conceivably have been made interesting, if any serious attempt had been made to explore what might really happen if two 7-year-old kids were shipwrecked on an island. But this isn't a realistic movie. It's a wildly idealized romance, in which the kids live in a hut that looks like a Club Med honeymoon cottage, while restless natives commit human sacrifice on the other side of the island". He also deemed the ending a blatant cop-out. He and Gene Siskel selected the film as one of their "dogs of the year" in a 1980 episode of Sneak Previews. Time Out commented that the film "was hyped as being about 'natural love'; but apart from 'doing it in the open air', there is nothing natural about two kids (unfettered by the bonds of society from their early years) subscribing to marriage and traditional role-playing".

Judith Martin of The Washington Post said, "For some 40 minutes, it's a charming and beautiful film", but criticized the script when the children mature into teens, particularly "the dialogue, with its silly double entendres, insisting on a relentlessly filthy chuckle to accompany the children's discovery of each other." Gary Arnold, also of The Washington Post, similarly called the film "a picturesque rhapsody to Learning Skills, Playing House, Going Swimming, Enjoying the Scenery and Starting to Feel Sexy in tropical seclusion". He particularly ridiculed the lead characters' persistent inability to make obvious inferences. One of the few positive reviews came from Variety which claimed it "a beautifully mounted production". Janet Maslin of The New York Times commented that the film is "more serene" than Kleiser's previous effort Grease, "but it also has a nonsensical glaze that contributes to the inadvertent merriment" and "it tends to be enjoyably silly". She concluded, "Nestor Almendros's cinematography is soothingly gorgeous, and so are Miss Shields and Mr. Atkins. Both are quite adequate to the movie's requirements, and neither has much acting to do--Miss Shields's hardest job, for instance, is to pretend she is giving birth to a baby without ever having wondered why she's put on so much weight. Her second hardest job is to keep the wind from ruffling her hair."

In a 2019 retrospective review for RogerEbert.com, critic Abbey Bender wrote: "When it comes to the depiction of burgeoning sexuality, 'The Blue Lagoon' wants to have it both ways ... with puberty making itself known through rather obvious dialogue. Sexual discovery is here the natural outcome of the storybook situation. So yes, the soft-focus montages of teen flesh are gratuitous but the film presents it all as innocent—these kids don't even know what sex is! They don't even know how a baby is made! They learn it the hard way, obviously. By couching sexuality in primitive purity, 'The Blue Lagoon' gets away with perversion that would likely be even more controversial today".

=== Box office ===
The film was the twelfth-biggest box office hit of 1980 in North America according to The Numbers, grossing US$58,853,106 in the United States and Canada on a $4.5 million budget.

=== Accolades ===
Date	Award	Category	Recipients	Result	Ref.
October 18, 1980	Young Artist Awards	Best Leading Young Actor in a Feature Film	Christopher Atkins	Nominated	
October 18, 1980	Young Artist Awards	Best Leading Young Actress in a Feature Film	Brooke Shields	Nominated	
October 18, 1980	Young Artist Awards	Best Major Motion Picture – Family Entertainment	The Blue Lagoon (Columbia)	Nominated	
1981	Jupiter Awards	Best International Actress	Brooke Shields	Won	
1981	Stinkers Bad Movie Awards	Worst Picture	The Blue Lagoon (Columbia)	Dishonourable mention	
2006 (expanded ballot)	Stinkers Bad Movie Awards	Worst Actor	Christopher Atkins	Nominated	
2006 (expanded ballot)	Stinkers Bad Movie Awards	Worst Actress	Brooke Shields	Won	
2006 (expanded ballot)	Stinkers Bad Movie Awards	Most Intrusive Musical Score	The Blue Lagoon (Columbia)	Won	
2006 (expanded ballot)	Stinkers Bad Movie Awards	Worst On-Screen Couple	Christopher Atkins and Brooke Shields	Nominated	
January 31, 1981	Golden Globe Awards	New Star of the Year – Actor	Christopher Atkins	Nominated	
March 31, 1981	Academy Awards	Best Cinematography	Néstor Almendros	Nominated	
March 31, 1981	Golden Raspberry Awards	Worst Actress	Brooke Shields	Won	
March 25, 1990	Golden Raspberry Awards	Worst Actor of the Decade	Christopher Atkins	Nominated	
March 25, 1990	Golden Raspberry Awards	Worst Actress of the Decade	Brooke Shields	Nominated	
March 25, 1990	Golden Raspberry Awards	Worst New Star of the Decade	Christopher Atkins	Nominated	
March 25, 2000	Golden Raspberry Awards	Worst Actress of the Century	Brooke Shields	Nominated	
July 1981	Saturn Awards	Best Fantasy Film	The Blue Lagoon (Columbia)	Nominated	

== Versions and adaptations ==
The Blue Lagoon was based on Henry De Vere Stacpoole's novel of the same name, which first appeared in 1908. The first film adaptation of the book was the British silent 1923 film of that name, which is now lost. There was another British adaptation in 1949.

The sequel Return to the Blue Lagoon (1991) picks up where The Blue Lagoon left off, except with confirmation that Richard and Emmeline are dead when found in the boat. Their son is rescued.

A television adaptation of the novel by TV network Lifetime, Blue Lagoon: The Awakening, was released in 2012.

The Indian film Ina (1982), directed by I. V. Sasi, is inspired by The Blue Lagoon. The story is set in the Indian state of Kerala and explores teen lust, child marriage and the consequences. The Indian film Teri Baahon Mein (1984) and the Hindi film Jaan Ki Kasam (1991) are also inspired by it.

== Home media ==
The Special Edition DVD, with both widescreen and fullscreen versions, was released on October 5, 1999. Its special features include the theatrical trailer, a behind-the-scenes featurette called An Adventure in Filmmaking: The Making of The Blue Lagoon, a personal photo album by Brooke Shields, audio commentary by Randal Kleiser and Christopher Atkins, and another commentary by Kleiser, Shields, and Douglas Day Stewart. The film was re-released in 2005 as part of a two-pack with its sequel, Return to the Blue Lagoon.

A limited-edition Blu-ray disc of the film was released on December 11, 2012, by Twilight Time. The Blu-ray includes an isolated score track and three original teasers, in addition to the special features ported from the 1999 DVD release.

The 1980 movie was made available for streaming through services such as Amazon Video and Vudu.

== See also ==
- The Blue Lagoon, 1923 version
- The Blue Lagoon, 1949 version
- Paradise, 1982 film
- Return to the Blue Lagoon, 1991 film
- Blue Lagoon: The Awakening, 2012 made-for-television film
