= The Garden of God =

1923 novel by Henry De Vere Stacpoole

- Author: Henry De Vere Stacpoole
- Language: English
- Series: Blue Lagoon trilogy
- Genre: Romance
- Publisher: Hutchinson
- Publication date: 1923
- Publication place: United Kingdom
- Media type: Print (hardcover)
- Pages: 288
- Preceded by: The Blue Lagoon
- Followed by: The Gates of Morning

The Garden of God is a romance novel by Henry De Vere Stacpoole, first published in 1923. It is the second novel in the Blue Lagoon trilogy, following The Blue Lagoon (1908) and concluding with The Gates of Morning (1925). The Garden of God was adapted into the film Return to the Blue Lagoon, released in 1991.

== Plot summary ==
The sequel picks up where the first book left off, with Arthur Lestrange in the ship Raratonga discovering his son Dick and niece Emmeline with their own child, lying in their fishing boat, which has drifted out to sea. While the last line of The Blue Lagoon states that they are not dead but sleeping, the first line of the sequel is "No, they are dead", and the reader is told that they have stopped breathing. The child is drowsy but alive and is picked up by the sailors.

Arthur is shaken but at the same time relieved. He can see that Dick and Emmeline were healthy and that they must have lived in peace. He feels it is better that they died while still in a savage state and did not have to return to civilization. He has a dream vision of the pair; they ask him to come to Palm Tree, the island where they lived, and promise he will see them again.

Their child becomes quite popular with the Raratonga's crew. His favourite among the sailors is a rascally quasipirate called Jim Kearney. Because the child says "Dick" and "Em" while playing with the sailors, Kearney calls him Dick M.

Captain Stanistreet has been concerned for Arthur's sanity since they found Dick and Emmeline, but he appears calm when they get to Palm Tree, investigating the things the couple left behind. Only when he enters the house and finds the flower decorations and neatly arranged supplies – unmistakably the work of Emmeline – does he break down in tears.

Arthur plans to stay on the island with Dick M, and the captain of the Raratonga asks for volunteers from among his crew to stay. Jim Kearney volunteers. The captain says they will return the following year, but the ship is promptly swallowed up in a storm out at sea. Arthur believes his dream vision is partly fulfilled when he looks at Dick M and notices the characteristics of both Emmeline and Dick in him. Kearney does most of the parenting for Dick M.

Years pass; Arthur dies quietly while walking in the forest, and his body is never found. Kearney and Dick M are left to their own devices until an intruder enters: a young woman named Katafa (her name means "Frigatebird"). She hails from the island of Karolin, 40 miles away, which is populated by Kanaka natives. It is a huge, almost treeless coral atoll, with no water source other than rain. Dick and Emmeline were aware of the Kanaka's existence but never encountered them – for many reasons, they stay away from Palm Tree and believe it is haunted. Katafa is actually the daughter of a Spanish sea captain who was killed to prevent him from taking water from their wells during a drought. Raised by priestess Le Juan, and psychologically conditioned as a taminan untouchable, she can talk and interact with Karolin natives, but cannot touch or be touched by them. She is on Palm Tree only because a storm blew her fishing boat off course. She makes friends with Dick M and teaches him her language, naming him Taori, but Kearney is suspicious of her, particularly when he finds she evades touch. She is likewise antagonistic toward him for having tried to touch her.

Her boat is destroyed by a volley from a passing ship, so she has to stay on Palm Tree until further notice. She lights a fire as a prayer to Nanawa, the ocean god, to return her to Karolin, but Kearney thinks she is trying to signal her people to attack the island. She gets back at Kearney by stealing his chewing gum, blunting his fish spears, and sabotaging his fishing lines. He comes to believe she is out to kill him and is about to return the favour when pursuing her into the lagoon, he is trapped and killed by a giant tentacled cephalopod.

Left to themselves, Dick M and Katafa live somewhat as Dick and Emmeline had done; Dick M takes Katafa for granted unless he wants help or an audience. Katafa still wants to go home; she creates an image of Nan, the gentler of Karolin's two gods, out of a coconut shell, and puts it up on the reef on a pole, as a signal should any Karolin fishermen come close to the island. The god belongs only to Karolin's people and will show either that someone from Karolin lives on Palm Tree, or that Nan has been "kidnapped".

Sure enough, four Karolin fishermen arrive. Seeing their proprietary god on a reef with Dick M (a foreigner) nearby, they attack him. He lashes out, killing one. Katafa is angry when she learns her people were that close, but she finds she cannot hate Dick M; she's falling in love with him, to the point that she begins to desire to touch other living things. Dick M wants to hug her, but she automatically evades him and hides in the forest, due to her psychological conditioning.

The narrative focus shifts to Karolin. The three remaining fishermen return with their terrible news. The fisherman Dick M killed was the grandson of the island's king, Uta Matu, and the fishermen assume that where they saw one "foreigner", there must be dozens, maybe hundreds. Worst of all, Nan is there, seemingly stolen by the newcomers. Advised by Le Juan in one of her epileptic trances, the king declares war and all the men of Karolin assemble in their canoes, led by the king's son Laminai and his second son, Ma.

In the middle of the night, Dick M pursues Katafa through the forest once more, carrying a spear in case of trouble, when he runs straight into the warriors. He kills Ma with the spear and is about to be killed by Laminai when Katafa leaps out of nowhere and attacks Laminai. The people have long believed Katafa to be dead, so the warriors flee, thinking she is a ghost. A sudden storm blows up, and in the darkness, noise, and confusion, the Kanaka kill each other.

Now able to hold and touch one another, Dick M and Katafa become lovers. They stay together on Palm Tree but prepare to leave for Karolin. When a schooner of copra harvesters arrives, crewed by Melanesian slaves under the direction of two white men, Dick M wants to speak to them but is attacked. He kills the leader, and the Melanesians stage an uprising and take over the island. Dick M and Katafa escape to Karolin. By chance, Dick M has picked up a large, beautifully decorated club left by the warriors. Katafa tells Dick M that it is the sacred war club, and can be carried only by men of the royal family, so he must be the new king of Karolin, and indeed, when they get there, Uta Matu has died. The people – women, very young men, and little children – have turned against old priestess Le Juan, who has terrorized them for so many years and whose advice had sent all the warriors to die on Palm Tree. She drops dead of a stroke when she sees Katafa, seemingly returned from the dead, and the people proclaim Dick M their new king.
