= Douglas Day Stewart =

American screenwriter and film director

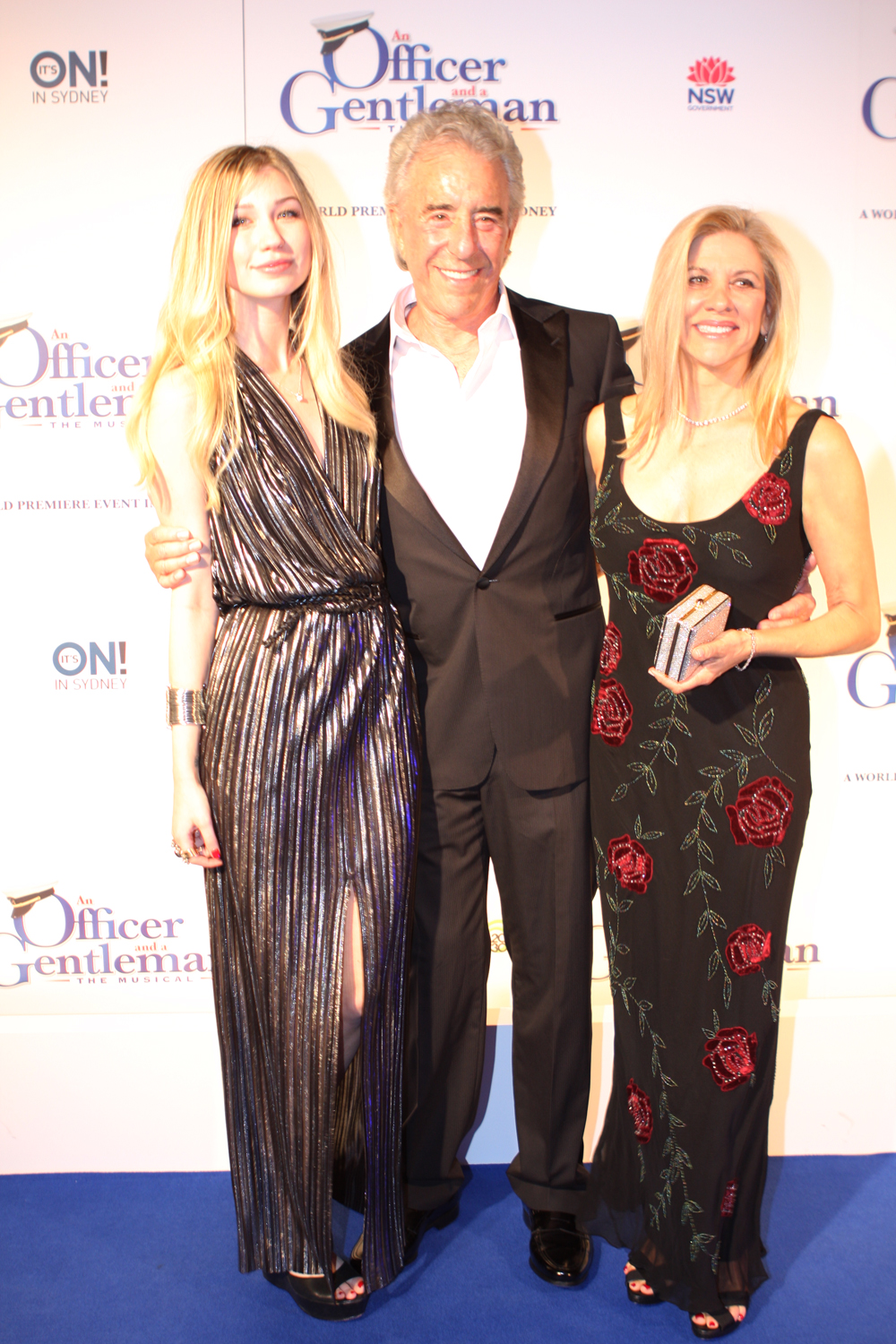
- Stewart with daughter Shady (left) and wife Judy (right), in 2012
- Born: January 1, 1940 (age 86); Oklahoma City, Oklahoma, U.S.
- Education: Claremont McKenna College; Northwestern University
- Occupations: Screenwriter, film director
- Website: douglasdaystewart.com

Douglas Day Stewart (born January 1, 1940) is an American screenwriter and film director. He was nominated for the Academy Award for Best Original Screenplay, for the 1982 film An Officer and a Gentleman.

== Early life ==
Stewart was born on January 1, 1940, in Oklahoma City, Oklahoma, and moved to San Marino, California during his adolescence. He graduated from Claremont McKenna College in 1962.

From 1962 to 1965, Stewart served in the United States Navy, initially intending enrolling as a Navy Aviation Officer Candidate, from which he was later disqualified due to a medical issue. He was transferred to a unit overseeing the transportation of 7th Marine Regiment to South Vietnam. His experiences in Candidate School would later form the basis for his screenplay for An Officer and a Gentleman.

After his discharge, Stewart earned a Masters of Arts in radio, Film and Television from Northwestern University.

== Career ==
After working as a playwright, Stewart's first screenwriting credit was for the television series Room 222. He subsequently wrote for several programs, including Bonanza and The Boy in the Plastic Bubble. The latter earned him a Primetime Emmy Award nomination for Outstanding Writing for a Limited or Anthology Series or Movie.

In 1980, Stewart wrote the screenplay for the box-office hit The Blue Lagoon.

In 1982, Stewart wrote and co-produced the hit romantic drama An Officer and a Gentleman. A critical and commercial success, the film earned Stewart an Oscar nod for Best Original Screenplay. He made his directorial debut two years later, with the film Thief of Hearts.

== Filmography ==
=== Screenplays and Teleplays ===
- Room 222 (episodes: "KWWH", "Stay Awhile, Mr. Dream Chaser", "The Quitter" and "You Don't Know Me, He Said") (1971–1972) (TV)
- Bonanza (episode: "The Initiation") (1972) (TV)
- Cannon (episodes: "The Rip-Off" and "Catch Me If You Can") (1972–1973) (TV)
- The Man Who Could Talk to Kids (1973) (TV)
- Murder or Mercy (1974) (TV)
- Gone with the West (1975)
- The Last Survivors (1975) (TV)
- The Boy in the Plastic Bubble (1976) (TV)
- The Other Side of the Mountain Part 2 (1978)
- The Blue Lagoon (1980)
- An Officer and a Gentleman (1982) (also producer)
- Thief of Hearts (1984; also director)
- Listen to Me (1989; also director)
- The Scarlet Letter (1995)
- Silver Strand (1995)
- What About Love (2020)

=== Novels ===
- An Officer and a Gentleman's Daughter (2024)
