= The Gates of Morning =

1925 novel by Henry De Vere Stacpoole

- Author: Henry De Vere Stacpoole
- Language: English
- Series: Blue Lagoon trilogy
- Genre: Romance
- Publisher: Hutchinson
- Publication date: 1925
- Publication place: United Kingdom
- Media type: Print (hardcover)
- Pages: 286
- Preceded by: The Garden of God

The Gates of Morning is a romance novel by Henry De Vere Stacpoole, first published in 1925. It is the third and final novel of the Blue Lagoon trilogy which began with The Blue Lagoon (1908) and continued with The Garden of God (1923).

Stacpoole wrote this third book as a kind of exposé of the despoiling of South Sea Island cultures and people by Europeans. His introduction says:

Never in the history of the world has ruin fallen on a people as it has fallen upon the natives of these far islands; nowhere else will you find the remains of a once noble race left in its original setting of pure air, yet stinking of gin and petrol and exhibited at times to the world between the finger and thumb of Romance or Realism. Could it speak, this remnant, would it not say: "White man, you have taken from us all good things but Death; you have given us all bad things but Pride; make one return -- Silence. Do not write about us; or, writing, remember only what we were"?

== Plot summary ==
The novel picks up a day or so after the events after The Garden of God. Dick Lestrange, son of Dicky and Emmeline Lestrange, is about 14 or 15. He has come to love Katafa, a Spanish girl who is the adopted daughter of the Kanaka people of the island of Karolin, about 40 miles (64 km) from the island (Palm Tree) where his parents lived. Now, she has brought him to her island, and due to a series of complicated political circumstances, the people have declared him their new king.

Dick is not unwilling to lead the people but needs advice and guidance. He also sees immediately that the island has a defence problem. In The Garden of God, all the Karolin men of warrior age and status have died as the result of an ill-advised attack on Palm Tree and all their war canoes were burned. Fishing canoes still exist, but new war canoes must be built at once. The Melanesian slaves who took over Palm Tree at the end of The Garden of God were all men; if they decide to make Palm Tree (which the Kanaka call Marua) their permanent home, they will attack Karolin, the nearest island, to steal women.

He sends for three elderly men, expert canoe builders, from the southern side of the immense island, but the ladies who took his message return without them, saying they do not acknowledge Taori (Dick) as their leader. Dick goes in person to explain the situation and meets Aioma, the oldest canoe builder, and his granddaughter Le Moan, age 14, who falls in love with Dick on sight. She has no idea that Dick is already married, let alone that his bride is her own Aunt Katafa (Katafa being an adopted daughter of the late priestess Le Juan and therefore sister to Le Jenabon, Le Juan's biological daughter, who is Le Moan's mother).

Left alone on the southern shore when all the other people from the south side go north to help with the canoe building, Le Moan sees the Kermadec, a schooner full of white men, sail into the lagoon. Thinking they might attack the people, and especially Dick, Le Moan tells them that she is alone on the island and that everyone else died in a storm. Captain Peterson, a rough and ferocious-looking but kindhearted man, takes her aboard and gives her over to Sru, his Paomotuan assistant, to stay with the Kanaka crew until he can find her a place to live on another island. Talking with Le Moan, Sru learns two things; the girl has a gift of absolute direction and can find her way to any place she has ever been without the need of a compass; and she wears a very large double pearl ornament, which tells Sru that Karolin's lagoons are full of pearls.

Sru successfully encourages her to confide in him, including the part about her being in love with Dick and trying to protect him. She also tells him that the lagoon is indeed thick with pearl oysters. Sru tells her Captain Peterson would never have harmed Dick or the people, but that he must not be told about the pearls, because he is something of a profiteer and might take everything for himself. He spends the next few weeks teaching her how to steer the ship. With first mate Rantan and a beachcomber named Carlin, who is hitching a ride on the ship to go to the northern islands, Sru plans and carries out a mutiny, killing both Peterson and a white sandalwood trader—and framing the natives of the island where the sandalwood trader lived for the murder.

Meanwhile, Aioma is enthusiastically directing the people in the building of new war canoes and conversing endlessly with Dick about boats, about the model ships built long ago by Kearney and treasured by Dick as his one remaining link with his old life. Aioma has also become Dick's chief of staff, so to speak, advising him about etiquette and his duties as king (for instance, he warns Dick that he must not lower himself to work with the people because to be seen as their equal is unfitting). The Kermadec returns to Karolin, guided by Le Moan, who remains on board as Rantan and Carlin go ashore, shoot a number of the people including two babies, and break up the half-finished canoes. Returning to the Kermadec, they tell the Kanaka crew that the people of Karolin attacked them, but Le Moan saw what really happened and tells the crew later, advising them that the people of Karolin are good and will accept them if they go ashore in peace.

Le Moan manages to kill Carlin, and tries to kill Rantan; as he defends himself, she is rescued by crewman Kanoa, who is secretly in love with her. They tie up Rantan and deliver him into the hands of the Karolin people, who indeed welcome the Kanaka from the Kermadec in peace and friendship. Dick gives Rantan to the mothers of the babies who died, to do with as they see fit. Only now does Le Moan discover that Dick and Katafa are married.

A few days later, the tide goes out at half flood and returns with a vengeance, like a tsunami. Three great waves sweep the island, destroying everything, while the people take to the trees. In the next hours, huge flocks of birds are seen in the skies, coming from the direction of Palm Tree. When Aioma, Dick, and Le Moan decide to take the Kermadec out on the ocean so that the men can learn to steer it properly, they make for Palm Tree, only to discover that it has completely sunk beneath the ocean. The island of the Blue Lagoon is no more.

Aioma believes this is a sign, not from the gods, but from Uta Matu, the late king of Karolin, whose warriors Dick is responsible for having killed (though they mostly killed each other). Le Moan, hearing this, decides to try to keep Dick for herself by steering away from Karolin and pretending she has lost her gift of direction (implying it is the curse of Uta Matu). Dick, devastated by the loss of his former home, is so desperate to get back to Karolin and Katafa that he takes ill. Le Moan cannot stand his suffering, gives up, declares that her direction sense has come back, and steers the Kermadec for home.

On the way, they encounter an abandoned ship. Aioma, unwisely, takes out his frustration with the papalagi (foreigners) and their ships by boarding this one – full of dead bodies – and setting fire to it. He proceeds to do the same to the Kermadec when they get back to Karolin. What he does not know is that his contact with the abandoned ship has infected him with measles. By the evening of the next day, everybody on Karolin has caught it, and having no resistance, nearly everyone dies. Katafa is frantic with grief, because Dick has caught it, too, and is lying delirious, speaking only in English.

Le Moan blames herself; if she had never asked the Kermadec for a lift, none of this would have happened. She believes the curse of Uta Matu, and her own grandmother Le Juan, have brought shame, disgrace, sickness, and death to her people. She calls out to Katafa, "Taori will not die: I go to save him; the nets are spread for him, but I will break them -- I, who have brought this evil". The instant she speaks these words, Dick's fever cools down and he begins to improve. As Katafa goes to care for him, Le Moan gets in her fishing boat. Sailing it clear out to sea, she takes the sail down, lies down at the bottom, and gives herself to the gods. Stacpoole ends the story by saying that to this day, Karolin remains unexplored and uncharted, because try as they might, no one can ever quite get there.
