= Christopher Atkins =

American actor (born 1961)

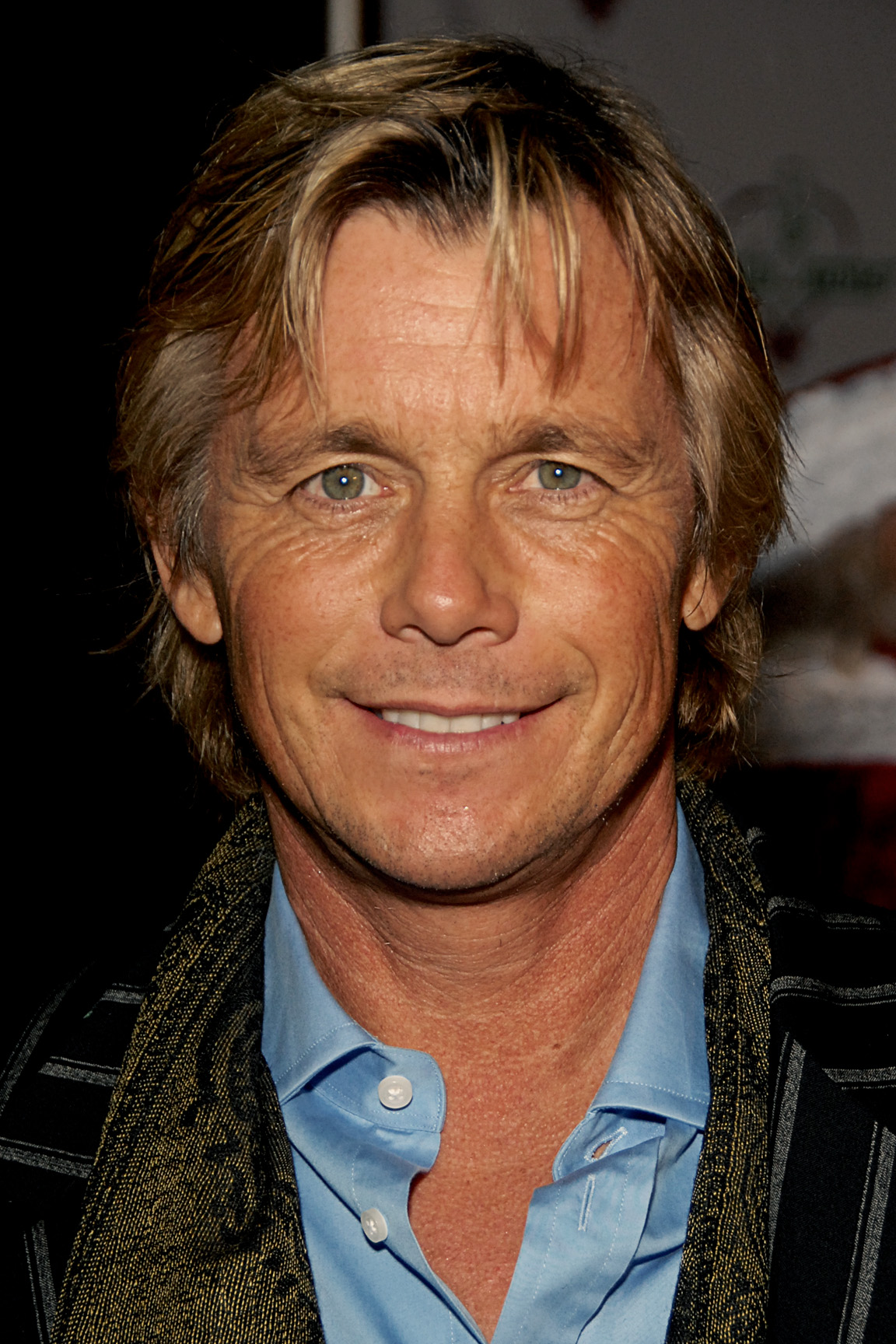
- Atkins attending the Bench Warmer Holiday Party at Empire, Hollywood, California on December 5, 2009
- Born: Christopher Atkins Bomann; February 21, 1961 (age 65); Rye, New York, U.S.
- Occupations: Actor; businessman
- Years active: 1979–present
- Spouse: Lyn Barron (m. 1985; div. 2007)
- Children: 2

Christopher Atkins Bomann (born February 21, 1961) is an American actor and businessman. He starred in the 1980 film The Blue Lagoon and played Peter Richards on Dallas (1983–1984).

== Early life ==
Christopher Atkins Bomann was born and raised in Rye, New York. He is the son of Donald Bomann and Bitsy Nebauer, who divorced during his childhood. Atkins was an aspiring baseball player; when his baseball aspirations were derailed by knee problems, he started a modeling career. When he began acting, Atkins dropped the last name Bomann and used his middle name, Atkins, as his last name.

== Career ==
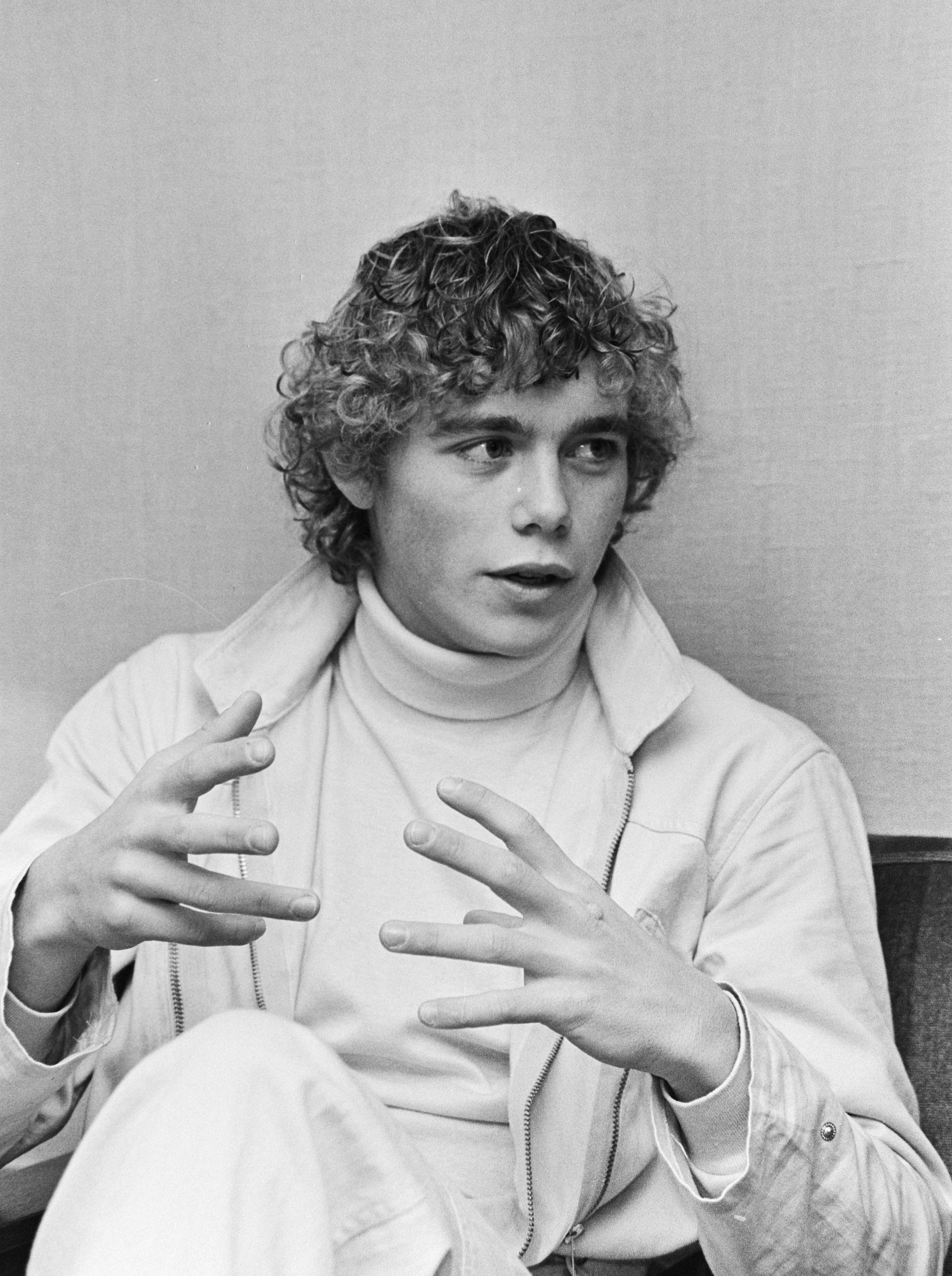
Atkins in 1981

A friend suggested that Atkins audition for The Blue Lagoon. The film's director, Randal Kleiser, stated that Atkins was a sailing instructor with no acting experience when he was cast in the film. Atkins and co-star Brooke Shields played teenage cousins who find love while living in an isolated tropical paradise after being marooned as children. Released in 1980, the film grossed over $58 million with a production cost of $4.5 million but received negative critical responses. Atkins appeared both nude and scantily clad in the film. While Blue Lagoon was controversial due to its nude scenes and sexual content, it nevertheless became a "pop culture phenomenon". Although Atkins was nominated for a Golden Globe Award for New Star of the Year in a Motion Picture – Male for The Blue Lagoon, critical responses to his performance were negative. A TV Guide reviewer wrote that "Atkins looks as if he would be more at home on a surfboard," and Gary Arnold wrote in The Washington Post that Atkins's performance "evoke[s] modeling sessions and beach-party movies."

In 1982 Atkins posed nude for Playgirl, and co-starred with Kristy McNichol in The Pirate Movie (1982), an update of Gilbert and Sullivan's operetta The Pirates of Penzance. His song "How Can I Live Without Her", which peaked at #71 on the Billboard Hot 100, was used in that film. For his performance in the film A Night in Heaven (1983), Atkins won the 1983 Golden Raspberry Award for Worst Actor. For one season (1983–1984), Atkins had a recurring role as swimming instructor Peter Richards on Dallas.

In 1999, Atkins appeared in the television sitcom Suddenly Susan, which starred Shields. In 2009, Atkins appeared on VH1's Confessions of a Teen Idol, a reality show featuring former teen idols. Atkins was ranked no. 76 on VH1's list of 100 Greatest Teen Stars.

Atkins became a luxury pool builder and co-developed the Christopher Atkins Strike Jacket E.F.L. (Extreme Fishing Lure), "a rubbery slipcovering for traditional baits."

In 2023, Atkins appeared in Ladies of the '80s: A Divas Christmas, where he reunited onscreen with his Dallas costar, Linda Gray.

In July 2025, Atkins once again graced the cover of Playgirl. A new Greg Gorman photoshoot was conducted for the issue.

== Personal life ==
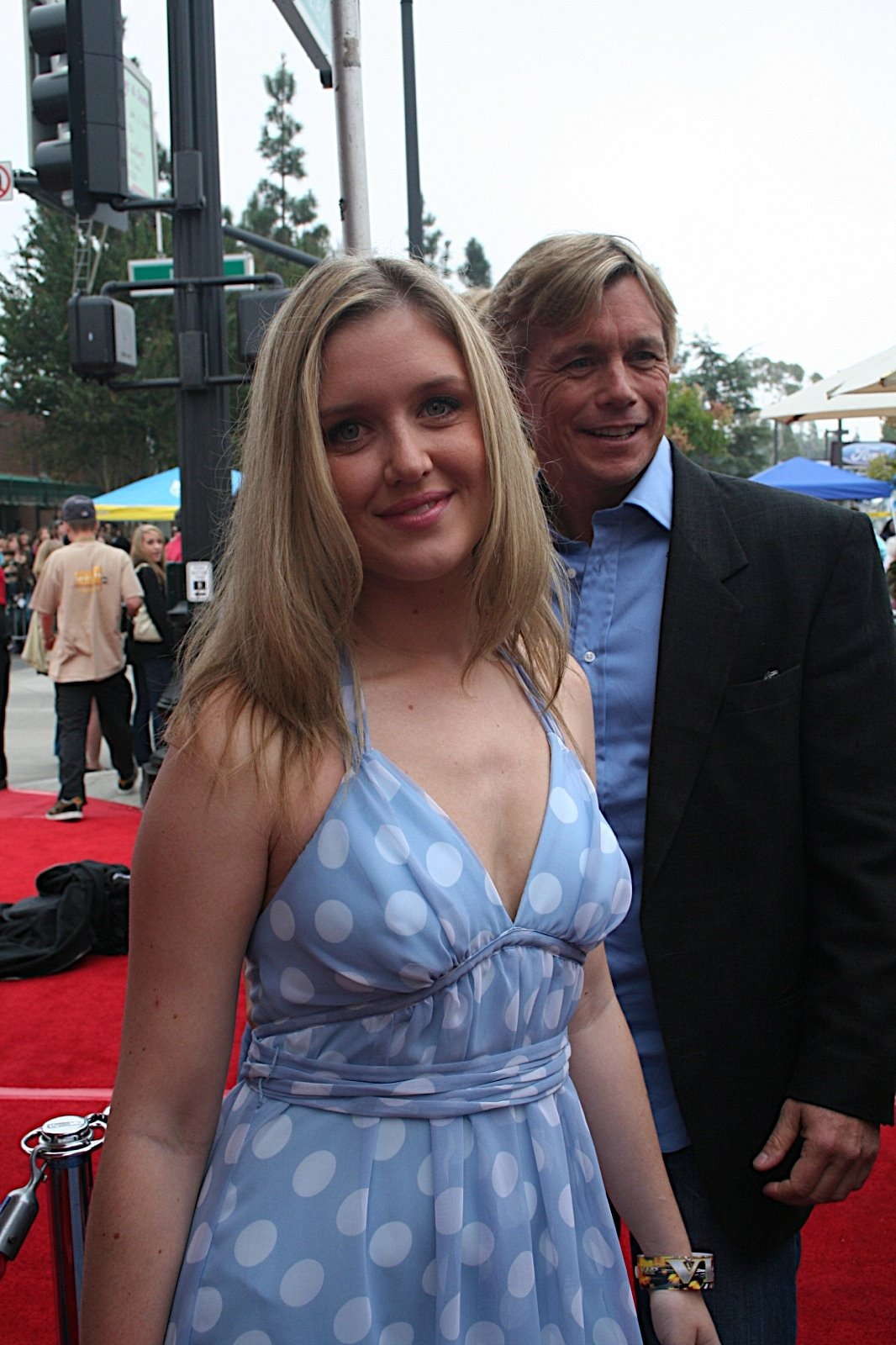
Atkins and his daughter, Brittney, on the red carpet at the 62nd Annual Mother Goose Parade in San Diego County, 2008

Atkins married Lyn Barron Weber of Sydney, Australia, on May 25, 1985. They have two children: son Grant Bomann (b. 1985) and daughter Brittney Bomann (b. 1987). They divorced in 2007.

In a 2009 interview, Atkins acknowledged his past struggle with alcoholism and stated that he had been sober for 22 years.

== Filmography ==
=== Film and television ===
Year	Title	Role	Notes
1980	The Blue Lagoon	Richard Lestrange	Nominated—Golden Globe Award for New Star of the Year in a Motion Picture – Male
1981	Swan Lake	Prince Siegfried	Voice only, English version
1981	Child Bride of Short Creek	Isaac King	TV movie
1982	Aladdin and the Magic Lamp	Aladdin	Voice only, English version
1982	The Pirate Movie	Frederic	Nominated—Golden Raspberry Award for Worst Actor
1983	A Night in Heaven	Rick Monroe	Golden Raspberry Award for Worst Actor
1983–84	Dallas	Peter Richards	TV series, 27 episodes (season 7)
1985	Secret Weapons	Allan Collier	TV movie
1985	Hotel	Jason Fielding	Episode: "Echoes"
1987	Beaks: The Movie	Peter	
1987	Night Rose: Akhbar's Daughter	Bitterman	TV pilot episode
1988	Mortuary Academy	Max Grimm	
1989	Listen to Me	Bruce Arlington	Golden Raspberry Award for Worst Supporting Actor
1990	Fatal Charm	Adam Brenner	TV movie
1990	Shakma	Sam	
1991	Extralarge: Miami Killer	Blake	TV movie
1992	Wet and Wild Summer!	Bobby McCain	
1993	The Adventures of the Black Stallion	Drag Racer	Episode: "Racing in the Streets"
1993	Dracula Rising	Vlad	Direct-to-video
1993	Die Watching	Michael Terrence	Direct-to-video
1993	¡Dispara!	Spence	
1993	King's Ransom	Spence	Direct-to-video
1994	Bandit Goes Country	Johnny Bruce	TV movie
1994	Trigger Fast	Dusty Fog	
1994	Guns of Honor	Dusty Fog	TV movie
1994	Signal One	Martin Bullet	
1995	Project Shadowchaser III	Snake	TV movie
1995	Smoke n Lightnin	Lightnin	
1996	It's My Party	Jack Allen	
1996	Dead Man's Island	Roger Prescott	TV movie
1996	Angel Flight Down	Jack Bahr	TV movie
1996	Silk Stalkings	Chance Reynolds	Episode: "Compulsion"
1997	High Tide	Raider	Episode: "A Rock and a Hard Place"
1997	Mutual Needs	Andrew	
1998	The Fairy King of Ar	—N/a	Writer and producer
1999	Suddenly Susan	Tony	Episode: "Sometimes You Feel Like a Nut"
1999	Lima: Breaking the Silence	Jeff	
1999	Deadly Delusions	Sam Gitlin	
2000	Malicious Intent	Alfred Russo	
2000	Stage Ghost	Matthew Bronson	
2001	Title to Murder	Paul Shaughnessy	
2001	Dark Realm	Jack Anderson	Episode: "Emma's Boy"
2001	The Little Unicorn	PC Sid Edwards	Direct-to-video
2001	True Legends of the West	Theodore Sutherland	
2002	13th Child	Ron	Direct-to-video
2002	Under the Gun	Bill	
2002	The Stoneman	Kip Hollings	
2002	Love Don't Come Easy	Clay	
2002	Tequila Express	David Manning	
2003	Quigley	Woodward Channing	
2003	Strike Force	Ringo	
2006	Caved In: Prehistoric Terror	John Palmer	TV movie
2007	Payback	Sean Walker	
2007	Spiritual Warriors	King of Sparta	
2008	Blind Ambition	Wild Bill	
2008	100 Million BC	Erik Reno	Direct-to-video
2008	Chinaman's Chance: America's Other Slaves	Jacob	
2009	Forget Me Not	Mr. Channing	
2009	Confessions of a Teen Idol	Himself	TV reality series, 8 episodes
2010	Melissa	Ellis	Short film (directed by his daughter)
2010	Stained Glass Windows	Detective Marshall	
2011	Sedona	Pierce	
2011	Family 2.0	Michael	Short film
2011	Exodus Fall	Wayne Minor	
2011	Assassins' Code	Daniel Dodd	
2011	Hidden	Dian's Husband	
2011	Harley's Hill	Mr. Miller	Direct-to-video
2012	Blue Lagoon: The Awakening	Mr. Christiansen	TV movie
2013	Crazy Kind of Love	Mr. Jeffries	
2013	Amy	Chris	Also associate producer
2014	Waiting in the Wings: The Musical	Priest	
2014	Better Late Than Never	—N/a	Short film (executive producer)
2014	Guardian Angel	John Robertson	
2014	CSI: Crime Scene Investigation	Jimmy Turelli	Episode: "Dead Rails"
2015	A Horse for Summer	Pastor Bob	
2015	The Sparrows: Nesting	Mike Sparrow	Action On Film International Film Festival – Best Actor
2015	Kids vs Monsters	Charles	
2015	A Tennis Shoe in the Street	Lucky / Brandon	
2016	The Eleventh	Neil	TV series short, 5 episodes
2016	The Unlikely's	Daniel Jacobsen	
2018	Gathering of Heroes: Legend of the Seven Swords	Garrik Grayraven	
2018	The City of Gold	Richard Davenport	
2019	Defrost: The Virtual Series	George Michael Garrison	TV series short, 11 episodes
2019	One Remains	Samuel Mahoney	
2020	Lake of Fire 2020	Henry Wayne	
2021	Attraction to Paris	Edward	
2023	Ladies of the '80s: A Divas Christmas	Pete	Television film
