= List of people from Turin =

This is a list of people from or associated with the city of Turin, Italy.

== A ==
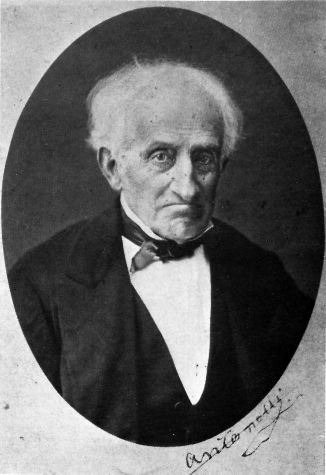
Alessandro Antonelli

- Adela Adamova (born 1927), ballet dancer.
- Adelaide of Susa (1016–1091), princess.
- Africa Unite, musical group.
- Piero Aggradi (1934–2008), footballer.
- Andrea Agnelli (born 1975), former president of Juventus.
- Edoardo Agnelli (1892–1935), industrialist.
- Gianni Agnelli (1921–2003), industrialist.
- Giovanni Agnelli (1866–1945), industrialist.
- Umberto Agnelli (1934–2004), industrialist.
- Marisa Allasio (born 1936), actress.
- Amadeo I of Spain (1845–1890), Italian prince, King of Spain, 1870 to 1873.
- Giuliano Amato (born 1938), politician.
- Fausto Amodei (born 1935), singer-songwriter.
- Felice Andreasi (1928–2005), actor.
- Piero Angela (1928–2022), journalist, television presenter, writer, popularizer of science.
- Alessandro Antonelli (1798–1888), architect.
- Giovanni Arpino (1927–1987), writer.
- Guido Ascoli (1887–1957), mathematician.
- Amedeo Avogadro (1776–1856), scientist.
- Gigi D'Agostino (born 1967), composer, singer, DJ.
- Massimo d’Azeglio (1798–1866), politician, writer, painter.

== B ==
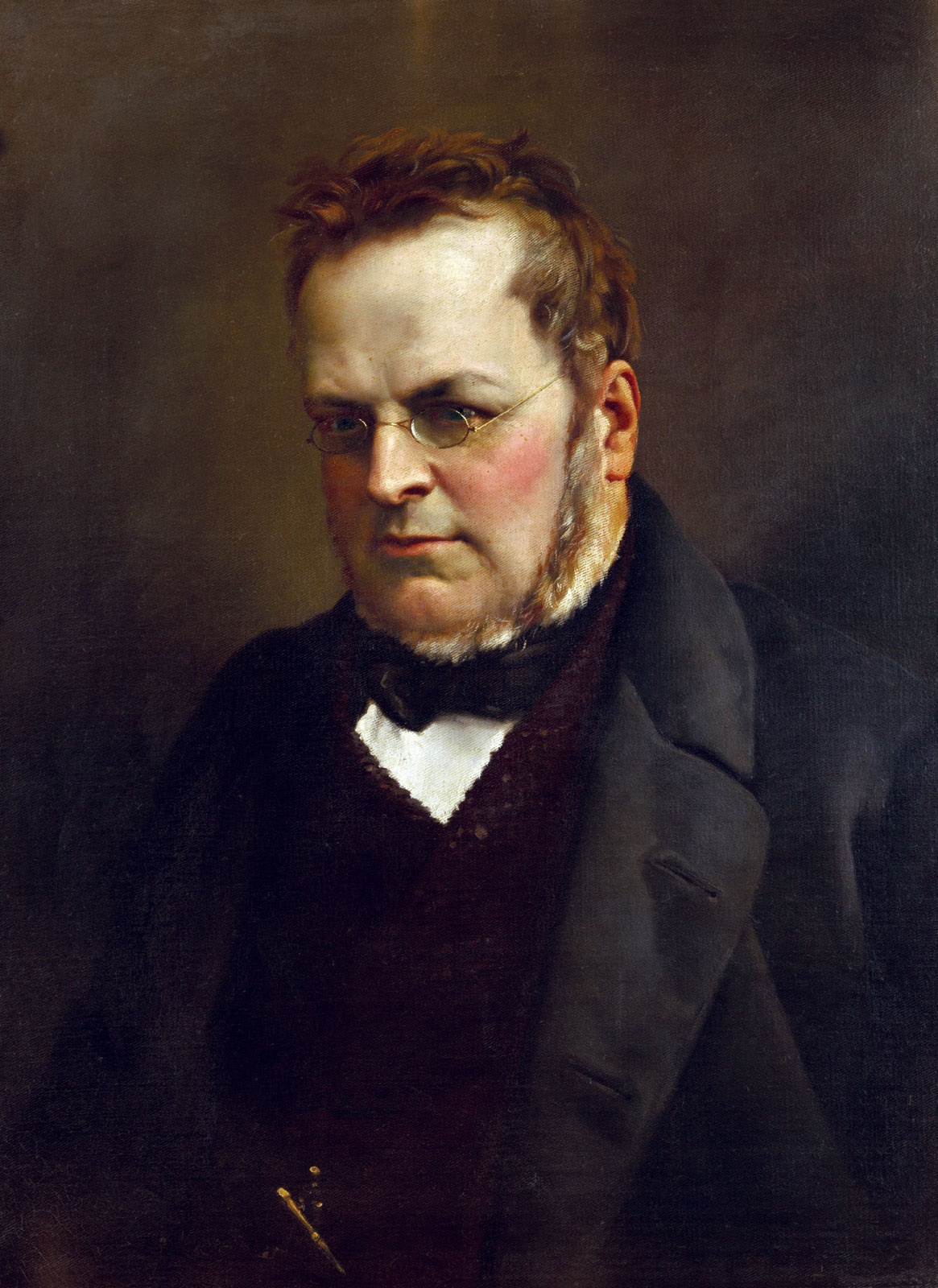
Camillo Benso Cavour di Ciseri

- Cesare Balbo (1789–1853), writer and politician.
- Giacomo Balla (1871–1958), painter.
- Franco Balmamion (born 1940), cyclist, two-time winner of the giro d’Italia.
- Giuseppe Baretti (1719–1789), writer and critic.
- Alessandro Barbero (born 1959), historian.
- Alessandro Baricco (born 1958), writer.
- Francesco Bagnaia (born 1997), Grand Prix motorcycle world champion.
- Giambatista Beccaria (1716–1781), physicist.
- Camillo Benso (1810–1861), Conte di Cavour, politician.
- Livio Berruti (born 1939), athlete.
- Fausto Bertinotti (born 1940), politician and trade unionist.
- Nuccio Bertone (1914–1997), automobile designer and constructor.
- Roberto Bettega (born 1950), footballer, manager.
- Carlo Biscaretti di Ruffia (1879–1959), founder of an automobile museum.
- Norberto Bobbio (1909–2004), philosopher.
- Giorgio Bocca (1920–2011), partisan, journalist, writer.
- Carlo Bodro (1841–c. 1900), organist and composer.
- Alessio Boggiatto (born 1981), swimmer.
- Ernesto Bonino (1922–2008), singer.
- Giampiero Boniperti (1928–2021), footballer, manager.
- Bartolomeo Bosco (1793–1863), illusionist.
- Giovanni Bosco (1815–1888), saint and founder of the Salesians.
- Carlo Bossoli (1815–1884), painter.
- Arturo Brachetti (born 1967), quick-change artist.
- Mercedes Bresso (born 1944), politician.
- Benedetto Brin (1833–1898), naval administrator and politician.
- Carla Bruni (born 1968), model, singer.
- Ada Bursi (1906–1996), architect
- Fred Buscaglione (1921–1960), singer.
- Alessandro Butti (1893–1959), type designer.

== C ==
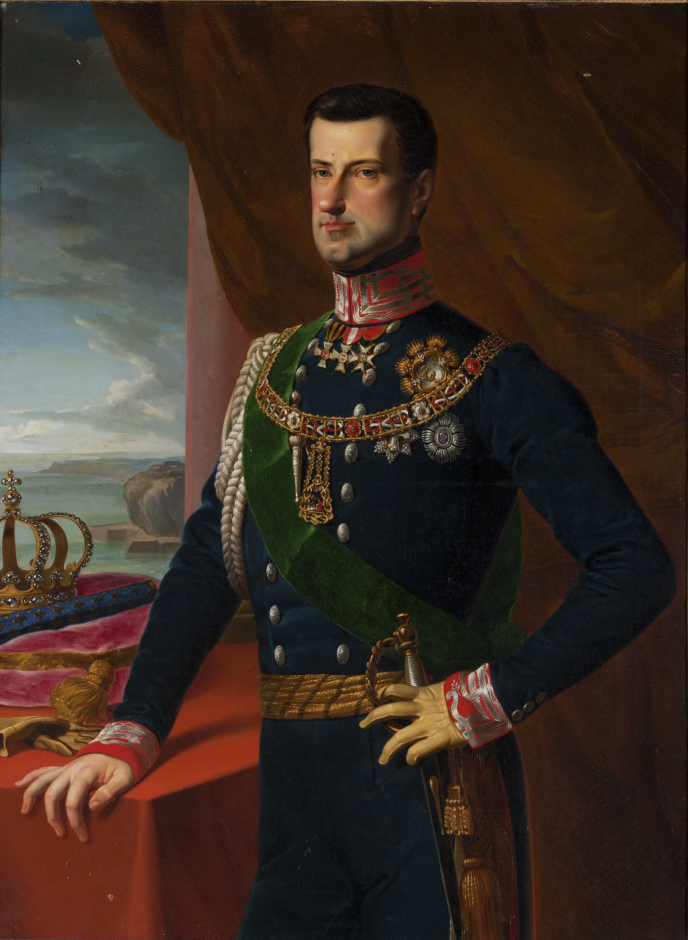
Carlo Alberto, ca.1832

- Giuseppe Cafasso (1811–1860), saint.
- Italo Calvino (1923–1985), writer.
- Mauro German Camoranesi (born 1976), footballer.
- Gaspare Campari (1828–1882), inventor of the drink Campari.
- Carlo Alberto (1798–1849), King of Sardinia.
- Alfredo Casella (1883–1947), composer and musician.
- Valentino Castellani (born 1940), mayor and director of the Olympic committee.
- Felice Casorati (1883–1963), painter.
- Giorgio Ceragioli (1930–2008), engineer.
- Giuseppe Cerutti (1738–1792), French-Italian author and politician.
- Luigi Palma di Cesnola (1832–1904), soldier, diplomat and archaeologist.
- Cristina Chiabotto (born 1986), Miss Italia, television presenter.
- Piero Chiambretti (born 1956), television presenter.
- Sergio Chiamparino (born 1948), mayor of Turin.
- Guido Chiesa (born 1959), director.
- Francesco Cirio (1836–1900), entrepreneur.
- Gustavo Colonnetti (1886–1968), mathematician and engineer.
- Gianpiero Combi (1902–1956), footballer; goalkeeper for the Italian team which won the World Cup in 1934.
- Giovanni Conso (1922–2015), jurist and politician.
- Athanase-Charles-Marie Charette de la Contrie (1832–1911), general, French royalist and ubiquitous military commander.
- Giuseppe Benedetto Cottolengo (1786–1842), saint and founder of the Piccola Casa della Divina Provvidenza.
- Roberto Cravero (born 1964), footballer.
- Leon Croizat (1894–1982), scientist.

== D ==
- Luigi Ferdinando Dagnese, novelist.

== E ==
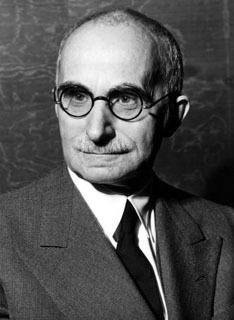
Luigi Einaudi

- Umberto Eco (1932–2016), writer.
- Eiffel 65, musical group.
- Antonella Elia (born 1963), actress, television presenter.
- Giulio Einaudi (1912–1999), editor, founder of the publishers Einaudi.
- Ludovico Einaudi (born 1955), musician, composer.
- Luigi Einaudi (1874–1961), economist, politician, President of the Republic.
- Emanuele Filiberto (1528–1580), Duke of Savoy.

== F ==
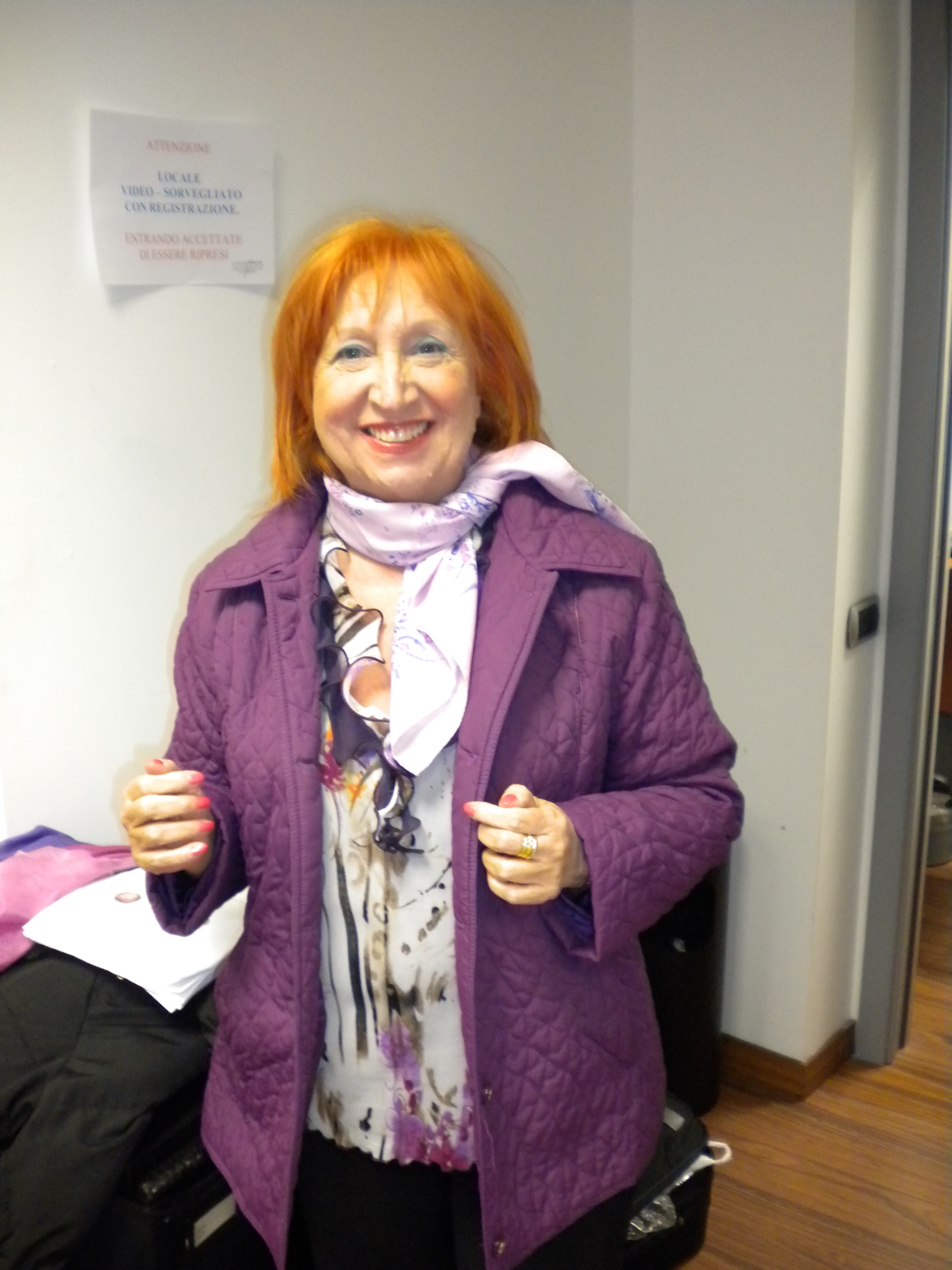
Margherita Fumero, 2010

- Francesco Faà di Bruno (1825–1888), army officer, scientist, mathematician and priest.
- Giorgio Faletti (1950–2014), comic, writer.
- Ugo Fano (1912–2001), scientist.
- Giuseppe Farina (1906–1966), Formula 1 world champion.
- Battista Farina (1893–1966), entrepreneur.
- Piero Fassino (born 1949), politician.
- Beppe Fenoglio (1922–1963), writer.
- Giuliano Ferrara (born 1952), journalist and politician.
- Davide Ferrario (born 1956), film director.
- Galileo Ferraris (1847–1897), scientist.
- Lorenzo Ferrero (born 1951), composer.
- Pietro Ferrero (1898–1949), entrepreneur.
- Nunzio Filogamo (1902–2002), the first Italian radio and television presenter.
- Giorgia Fiorio (born 1967), photographer.
- Luigi Firpo (1915–1989), historian.
- Vittorio Foa (1910–2008), politician.
- Pier Giorgio Frassati (1901–1926), Roman Catholic saint.
- Massimiliano Frezzato (born 1967), comic book author.
- Carlo Fruttero (1926–2012), writer.
- Guido Fubini (1879–1943), mathematician.
- Margherita Fumero (born 1947), television comic and theatrical actor.

== G ==
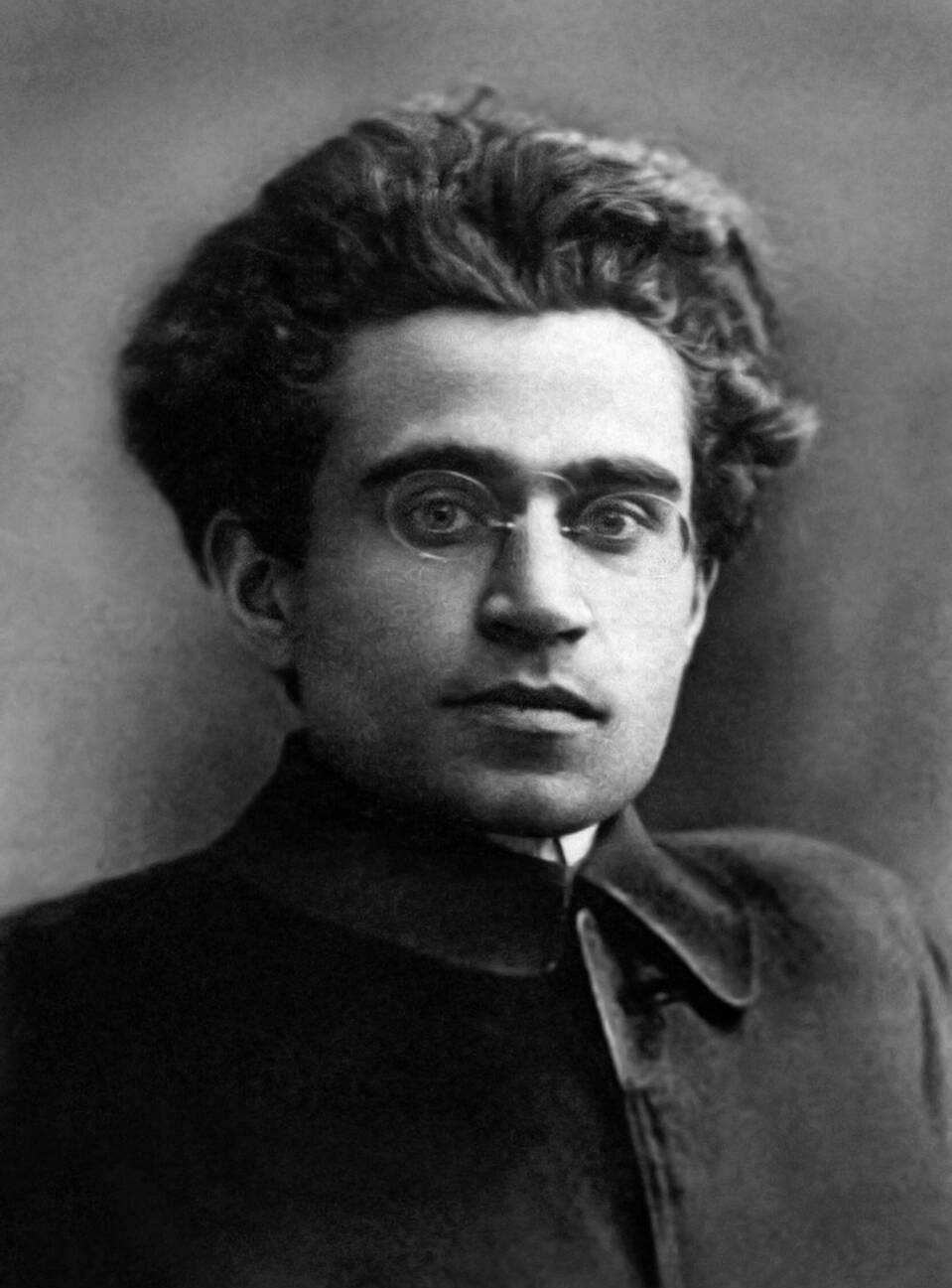
Antonio Gramsci

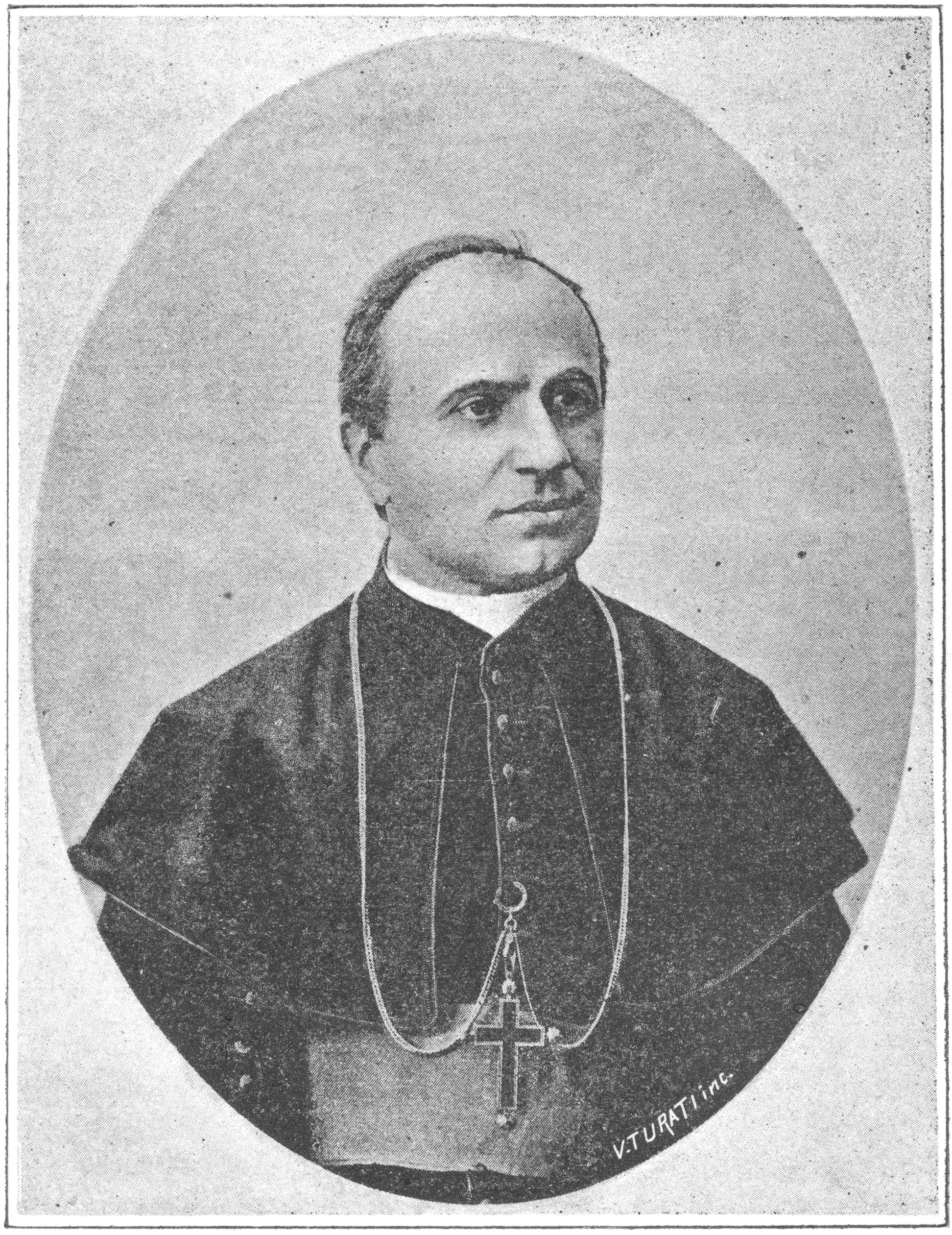
Giuseppe Marello

- Giuseppe Marello (1844–1895), Catholic bishop and Saint.
- Giuseppe Gabrielli (1903–1987), scientist.
- Ricardo Galeazzi (1866–1952), surgeon.
- Luciano Gallino (1927–2015), sociologist.
- Sonia Gandhi (born 1946), politician.
- Marcello Gandini (1938–2024), car designer.
- Gabriel Garko (born 1974), actor.
- Stanislao Gastaldon (1861–1939), composer.
- Giacinto Ghia (1887–1944), coachbuilder.
- Giuseppe Giacosa (1847–1906), poet, playwright, and librettist.
- Massimo Giletti (born 1962), television presenter.
- Natalia Ginzburg (1916–1991), writer.
- Vincenzo Gioberti (1801–1852), philosopher and politician.
- Giovanni Giolitti (1842–1928), politician.
- Sebastian Giovinco (born 1987), footballer.
- Piero Gobetti (1901–1926), politician.
- Cesare Goffi (1920–1995), professional footballer.
- Guido Gozzano (1883–1916), poet.
- Arturo Graf (1848–1913), poet and literary historian.
- Antonio Gramsci (1891–1937), politician, writer.
- Piero Gros (born 1954), skier.
- Guarino Guarini (1624–1683), architect.
- Count Angelo De Gubernatis (1840–1913), man of letters.
- Ambra Gutierrez (born 1992), model.

== I ==
- Massimo Introvigne (born 1955), attorney and founder of the Center for Studies on New Religions.

== J ==
- Giacomo Jaquerio (c. 1380–1453), painter.
- Filippo Juvarra (1678–1736), architect.

== L ==
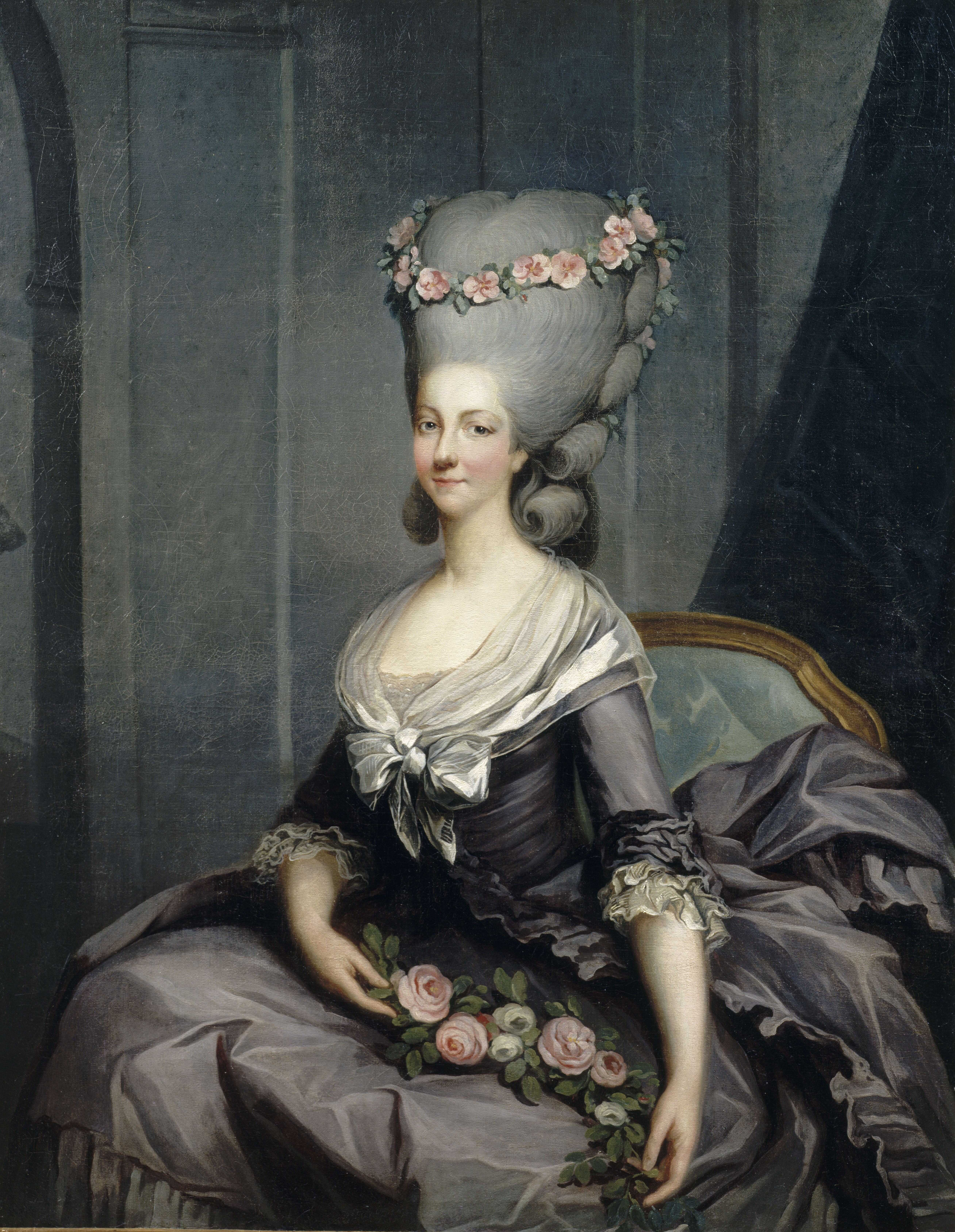
Marie Thérèse Louise of Savoy, Princesse de Lamballe, ca 1776

- Alberto La Marmora (1788–1863), general, politician.
- Joseph Louis Lagrange (Giuseppe Lodovico Lagrangia) (1736–1813), mathematician.
- Vincenzo Lancia (1881–1937), industrialist.
- Luigi Lavazza (1859–1949), founder of the Lavazza coffee manufacturers.
- Gad Lerner (born 1954), journalist.
- Gabriella Lettini (born 1968), Waldensian pastor, ethicist, and feminist theologian.
- Carlo Levi (1902–1975), writer, painter.
- Primo Levi (1919–1987), chemist, writer.
- Rita Levi Montalcini (1909–2012), biologist, senator for life, Nobel prizewinner.
- Luciana Littizzetto (born 1964), actress.
- Cesare Lombroso (1835–1909), scientist.
- Marie Thérèse Louise of Savoy (1749–1792), Princesse de Lamballe, House of Savoy.
- Franco Lucentini (1920–2002), writer.
- Salvador Luria (1912–1991), scientist, Nobel prize winner.

== M ==
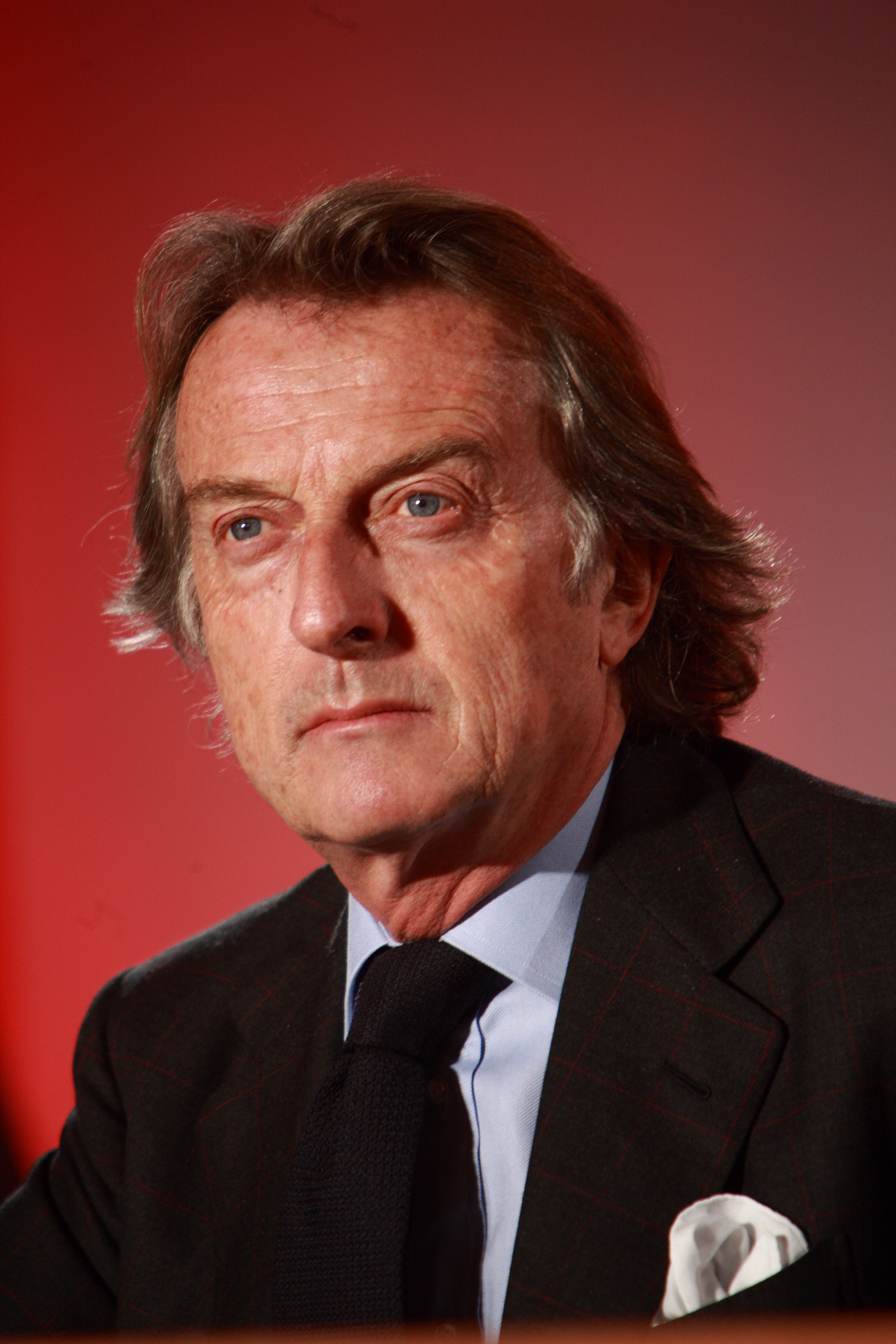
Luca Cordero di Montezemolo

- Erminio Macario (1902–1980), actor.
- Marco Maccarini (born 1976), television presenter.
- Joseph de Maistre (1753–1821), lawyer, diplomat, writer, and philosopher.
- Claudio Marchisio (born 1986), footballer.
- Carlo Marochetti RA (1805–1867), Italian-born French sculptor.
- Ugo Martinat (1942–2009), politician.
- Enrico Martino (born 1948), photojournalist.
- Mau Mau, band.
- Ezio Mauro (born 1948), journalist, current editor of La Repubblica.
- Maximus of Turin (c. 380 – c. 465), saint and father of the Church; the first known bishop of Turin.
- Sandro Mazzola (1942–2026), footballer.
- Valentino Mazzola (1919–1949), footballer.
- Juste-Aurèle Meissonier (1695–1750), goldsmith, sculptor and furniture designer.
- Luigi Meroni (1943–1967), footballer.
- Mario Merz (1925–2003), artist.
- Pietro Micca (1677–1706), soldier.
- Gianni Minà (1938–2023), journalist.
- Luciano Moggi (born 1937), director of Juventus F.C.
- Carlo Mollino (1905–1973), architect.
- Luca Cordero di Montezemolo (born 1947), entrepreneur.
- Franco Morzone (born 1918), footballer.
- Placido Mossello (1835–1894), painter.
- Leonardo Murialdo (1828–1900), saint.

== N ==
- Giulio Natta (1903–1979), chemist, Nobel prizewinner.
- Cesare Nay (1925–1994), footballer.
- Ugo Nespolo (born 1941), painter.
- Diego Novelli (born 1931), politician.
- Aldo Novarese (1920–1995), type designer.
- Alberto Naska (born 1990), racing driver and content creator.

== P ==
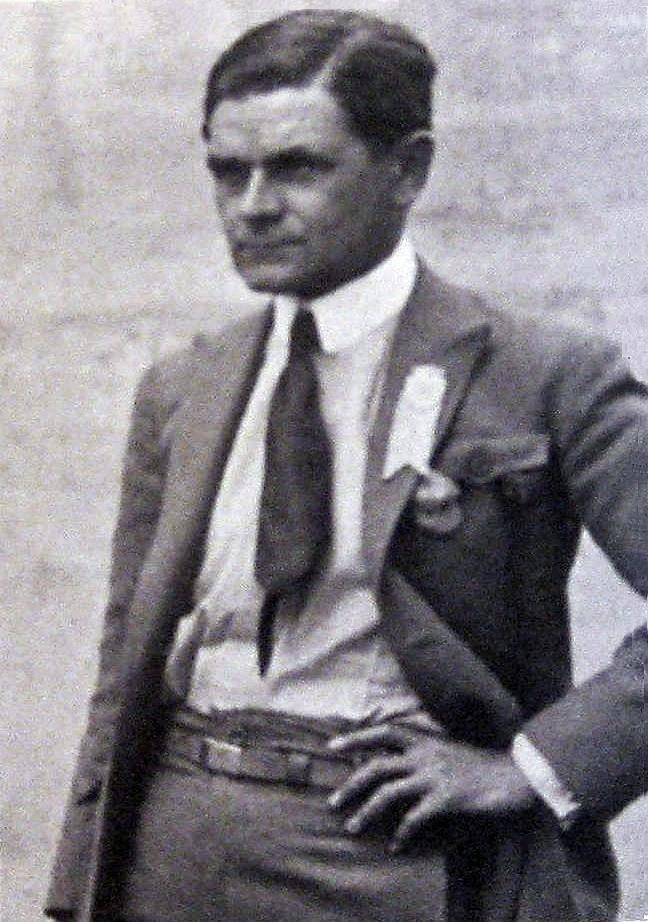
Vittorio Pozzo, 1920

- Giancarlo Pajetta (1911–1990), politician.
- Vilfredo Pareto (1848–1923), sociologist, economist and philosopher.
- Alba Parietti (born 1961), television presenter.
- Carlo Parola (1921–2000), footballer.
- Giovanni Pastrone (1883–1959), director.
- Giuseppe Patrucco (born 1932), retired footballer.
- Cesare Pavese (1908–1950), writer.
- Rita Pavone (born 1945), singer.
- Giuseppe Peano (1858–1932), mathematician.
- Giuseppe Pellizza da Volpedo (1868–1907), painter.
- Carlo Petrini (born 1949), founder of the International Slow Food Movement.
- Sergio Pininfarina (1926–2012), entrepreneur, senator for life.
- Gilberto Pogliano (born 1908), former professional footballer.
- Gabry Ponte (born 1973), DJ and member of Eiffel 65.
- Vittorio Pozzo (1886–1968), football coach; coach for the Italian team which won the World Cup in 1934 and 1938.
- Carola Prosperi (1883–1981), writer, feminist and journalist.
- Gaetano Pugnani (1731–1798), violinist and composer.

== Q ==
- Lidia Quaranta (1891–1928), actress.

== R ==
- Carol Rama (1918–2015), artist.
- Tullio Regge (1931–2014), scientist, Albert Einstein Medal recipient.
- Righeira, music duo.
- Johnson Righeira (born 1960), singer-songwriter, musician, record producer, actor.
- Michael Righeira (born 1961), singer-songwriter, musician, actor.
- Marco Rizzo (born 1959), politician.
- Stefania Rocca (born 1971), actress.
- Gianni Rodari (1920–1980), writer.
- Medardo Rosso (1858–1928), sculptor.

== S ==
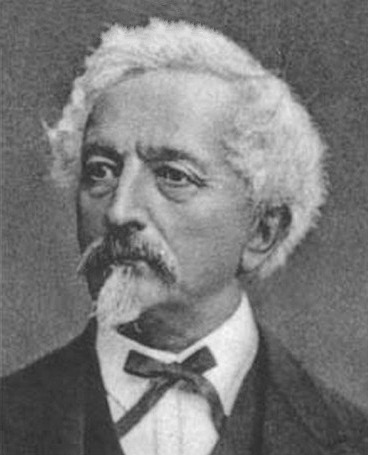
Ascanio Sobrero, 1860's

- Emilio Salgari (1862–1911), writer.
- Giuseppe Saragat (1898–1988), politician, President of the Republic.
- Massimo Scaglione (1931–2015), director.
- Gaetano Scirea (1953–1989), footballer.
- Quintino Sella (1827–1884), politician, entrepreneur.
- Dani Sénna (born 1991), footballer.
- Vincenzo Seratrice the Elder (1851–1922), painter.
- Andrea Laszlo De Simone (born 1986), musician.
- Leone Sinigaglia (1868–1944), composer, mountaineer.
- Ascanio Sobrero (1812–1888), chemist, discovered Nitroglycerin.
- Mario Soldati (1906–1999), writer, director.
- Germain Sommeiller (1815–1871), civil engineer.
- Piero Sraffa (1898–1983), economist.
- Subsonica, rock band.

== T ==
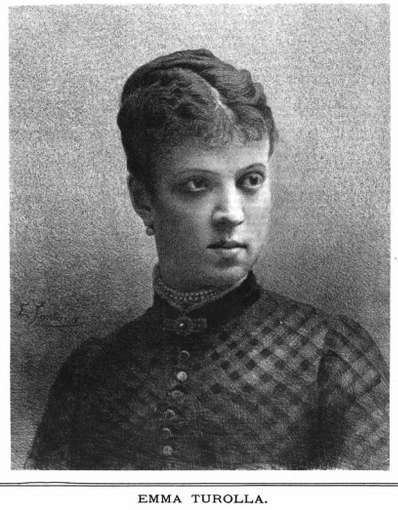
Emma Turolla, 1885

- Francesco Tamagno (1850–1905), operatic tenor.
- Armando Testa (1917–1992), graphic artist.
- Umberto Tozzi (born 1952), singer.
- Marco Travaglio (born 1964), journalist.
- Alex Treves (1929–2020), Italian-born American Olympic fencer.
- Teresina Tua (1866–1956), violinist.
- Emma Turolla (1858–1943), operatic soprano.

== U ==
- Umberto I (1844–1900), King of Italy.

== V ==
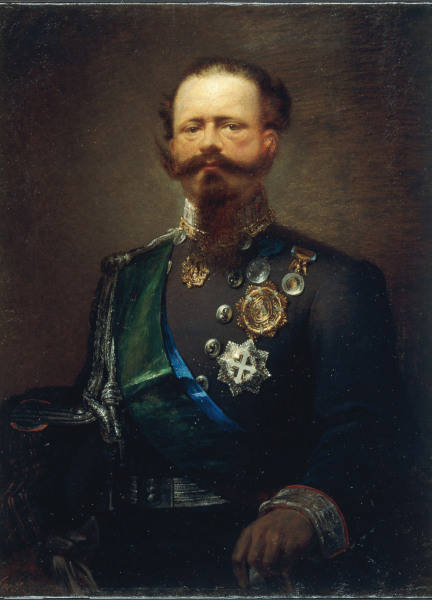
Victor Emmanuel II

- Raf Vallone (1916–2002), footballer, partisan, journalist and stage and screen actor.
- Ferruccio Valobra (1898–1944), soldier, antifascist and partisan.
- Cristina Vane, country blues singer, guitarist, banjoist and songwriter.
- Arturo Varvelli (born 1976), researcher.
- Gianni Vattimo (1936–2023), philosopher and politician.
- Simona Ventura (born 1965), television presenter.
- Luciano Violante (born 1941), politician.
- Vittorio Amedeo I (1587–1637), Duke of Savoy.
- Vittorio Amedeo II (1666–1732), King of Sardinia.
- Vittorio Emanuele II (1820–1878), King of Italy.
- Walter Volpatto (born 1971), motion picture colourist.

== W ==
- William VII of Montferrat (c. 1240–1292), Marquess.
