= The Blue Lagoon (1923 film) =

Lost 1923 British-South African film

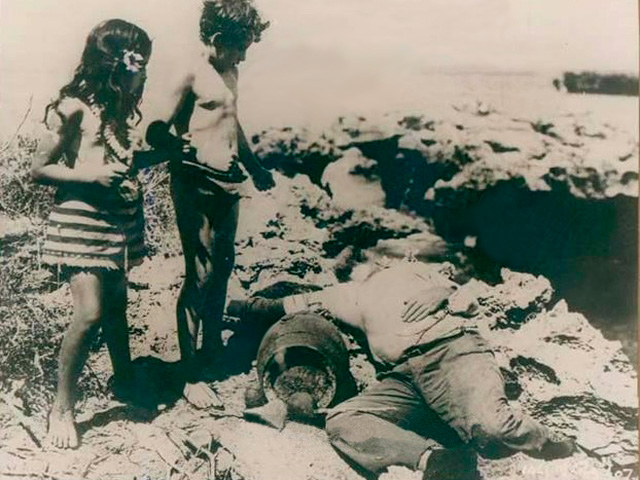
- Movie still
- Directed by: Dick Cruikshanks
- Written by: Henry De Vere Stacpoole (novel)
- Screenplay by: William Weston Bowden
- Based on: The Blue Lagoon by Henry De Vere Stacpoole
- Produced by: Dick Cruikshanks
- Starring: Molly Adair; Arthur Pusey
- Production company: African Film Productions
- Distributed by: International Variety and Theatrical Agency
- Release date: 5 February 1923 (South Africa)
- Running time: 6 reels 80 minutes
- Countries: South Africa; United Kingdom
- Language: Silent (English intertitles)

The Blue Lagoon is a lost 1923 British-South African silent film adaptation of Henry De Vere Stacpoole's 1908 novel of the same name about children who come of age while stranded on a tropical island. It is the first screen adaptation of the story, and two additional adaptations appeared in 1949 and 1980, with both versions achieving commercial success.

== Plot ==
Two young relatives, Dick Lestrange, a 10-year-old boy, and his cousin Emmeline Lestrange, an 8-year-old girl, become stranded on an uninhabited island after their ship catches fire. Paddy Button, their elderly servant, joins them and becomes their sole carer in their desperate situation. Paddy's love and devotion provide solace, but tragedy strikes when he discovers a hidden stash of rum and dies from alcohol poisoning, leaving the children to fend for themselves.

Dick and Emmeline begin to explore the unfamiliar world of sexuality that surrounds them as time passes on the island. A chance encounter piques their interest, leading them to explore their desires and emotions. They gradually form an intense and profound bond, and their relationship is romantic. Their love eventually results in the birth of a child, cementing their unique bond on the island.

Arthur Lestrange, Emmeline's guardian and uncle and Dick's biological father, abruptly disrupts their secluded existence when he discovers them after an exhaustive search. The children's unconventional way of life on the island clashes with the external influences and societal norms introduced by Arthur's arrival. Dick, Emmeline, and their child must navigate the complexities of their relationship, reconciling their isolated past with the new challenges and expectations imposed by Arthur and the outside world.

== Cast ==
- Molly Adair as Emmeline Lestrange
  - Doreen Wonfer as younger Emmeline
- Arthur Pusey as Dick Lestrange
  - Val Chard as younger Dick
- Dick Cruikshanks as Paddy Button

== Crew ==
- W. Bowden - Director of Photography

== Production history ==
=== Development ===
In January 1919, African Film Productions (AFP) secured the filming rights to Henry De Vere Stacpoole’s widely acclaimed novel The Blue Lagoon. AFP’s head, I. W. Schlesinger, had paid a substantial sum for the rights, as the book had been a commercial hit. Schlesinger had ambitious plans to make The Blue Lagoon AFP’s next blockbuster, following their earlier successes with King Solomon’s Mines (1918) and Allan Quatermain (1919), both based on novels by H. Rider Haggard. However, he knew careful preparation was crucial for the film’s success. AFP needed a qualified team, perfect filming locations, and resources to maintain production standards to represent the story's exotic and beautiful setting. The novel would require a meticulous screen adaptation that would preserve its essence and make appropriate adjustments to the medium.

Schlesinger took on the challenge of adapting The Blue Lagoon for the big screen, fully aware of the difficulties involved. However, he believed the effort would be worth it if done right. For a story of this kind, finding the right location, actors, and producer was crucial to its success on screen.

Conflicting rights issues between stage and cinema adaptations delayed AFP's production by almost three years. Basil Dean, who produced a successful stage version of The Blue Lagoon in England, had hoped to turn it into his debut film. However, he first presented the play at the Prince of Wales Theatre in London from October 1920 to February 1921, followed by a provincial tour to Edinburgh. These performances sparked interest in the Glasgow Evening Times, as they questioned how the experience of "two youngsters" growing up in isolation on a South Sea island could be portrayed on stage.

Basil Dean announced his intention to create a film adaptation of The Blue Lagoon in January 1920 and predicted it would be released in December of the same year. The casting of Madeline Robinson as the child Emmeline and Faith Celli as the adolescent Emmeline was announced in September, promising a high-quality film. In his autobiography, Dean stated that The Blue Lagoon was always more suited as a motion picture than as a stage play and that the play’s transfer to Broadway in 1921 was a failure. Consequently, the film's production was postponed following an exchange of messages with London. Stacpoole himself had doubts about the suitability of the stage for his story, arguing that motion pictures were better able to capture the natural world depicted in the novel and that the stage play lacked the emotional and comedic depth that was possible through expression and movement. The Motion Picture Studio reported in its 9 July 1921 issue that Gertrude McCoy was set to star as Emmeline.

William Weston Bowden carefully edited the script for the film, adapted from Stacpoole's original story about two young people who grow up without knowledge of human concepts like birth, death, and marriage. The success of the movie was dependent on the performances of two child actors and two young adult actors who portrayed the cousins, Dick and Emmeline.

=== Casting ===
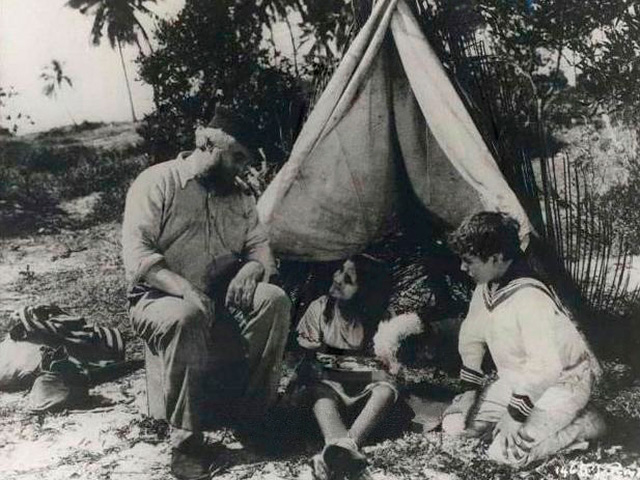
Doreen Wonfer, Arthur Pusey and Dick Cruickshanks in a shot from the film.

The directors selected two young South African actors, Val Chard and Doreen Wonfor, for the roles of Dick and Emmeline as children. Initially, it seemed that Dick's character would dominate the narrative. However, as the plot unfolded, Emmeline's role became more central, mainly due to her longstanding love for Dick, which began at the age of eight. Her deep affection led to her pregnancy and the birth of a child, highlighting the challenges posed by her youth in portraying such a complex role.

Molly Adair was only 17 years old when she was cast as Emmeline. Although she was still only a teenager, Adair's precociousness and flexibility as an actress were already apparent in her seven previous film appearances. She starred in Stella (1921), a cinematic adaptation of H. Rider Haggard's novel Stella Fregelius, co-starred with Clive Brook in Married to a Mormon (1922) and played the lead role in the film adaptation of Compton Mackenzie's Sinister Street (1922). She possessed what many believed to be the most critical attributes of a successful actress: a beautiful face, a resilient character, and a readiness to embark on adventurous journeys at any given moment.

The role of Dick as an adult was given to Arthur Pusey, a seasoned actor who worked with Sibyl Thorndyke in London's West End and also made appearances in several films such as The Bachelor's Club (1921), The Barton Mystery (1920), The Lonely Lady of Grosvenor Square (1922), and Stable Companions (1922).

=== Filming ===
It was reported that Molly Adair and Arthur Pusey had departed for Johannesburg on the S.S. Kinfauns Castle on 12 May 1922. According to contemporary reports, the primary locations for the film's shooting would most likely be in a tropical area close to South or West Africa, potentially the coral-reefed coast of Mauritius or the Seychelles. In July 1922, it was reported that a small group of around fifteen people were working hard on the East African Coast near Pemba, a place with many Arabic legends. Later, it was confirmed that a whole colony of workers had camped on a desert island off the coast of Portuguese East Africa near Porto Amélia (Pemba) for four months with the producer and his team. The company had chartered the "tiny island", which was part of the Quirimbas Islands chain off the northern coast of Mozambique.

Dick Cruikshanks was in charge of managing the actors, while Bowden's responsibility was overseeing the camera and crew. However, Cruikshanks encountered challenges persuading the child actors to focus on their work and not spend all their time playing around the island, as they needed to work with the sun and cameras.

In Johannesburg, a colossal statue of a man was constructed for the movie. It was made of stone, stood at a height of 50 feet, and had a frightening face with massive stone hands. The statue was meant to symbolise a brutal and aggressive deity. However, the South African Review criticised the statue, arguing that this small-scale depiction of savagery was insignificant compared to the millions of people who were sacrificed to the "Money Gods" of "Civilisation" during World War I.

In late November 1922, it was reported that The Blue Lagoon was nearing completion. Promotional photographs showcasing the movie were dispatched to England, creating anticipation among the audience. After filming for The Blue Lagoon, the production quickly moved to The Reef of Stars, a motion picture based on another story by Stacpoole. Notably, this film also featured Molly Adair in a prominent role.

In its issue dated 1 February 1923, The Bioscope announced that the International Variety and Theatrical Agency (IVTA) had just received the film negative of The Blue Lagoon from African Film Productions. It was stated that work was underway for trade shows. The film was lauded as a new and captivating form of screen entertainment, particularly the sections featuring the tropical island and lagoon. The film’s popularity was expected to attract audiences at all screenings. It was noted that no studio-built settings were used, maintaining authenticity, as all outdoor scenes were filmed on a small equatorial islet.

While filming, Molly Adair met Arthur James Siggins, a New Zealand-born policeman. They fell in love and got married. Molly then decided to give up her film career and accompany her husband on his numerous expeditions, which included long journeys across the country. Their daughter, Jillian, who later changed her name to Jill Adams after marriage in 1951, became a well-known model and actress, often referred to as "Britain's Marilyn Monroe."

== Release ==
The Blue Lagoon was released at the Bijou cinema in Johannesburg on 5 February 1923. It was planned to be shown for only three days; however, due to its immense popularity, the Bijou extended the screening to six days. This decision attracted giant crowds and generated a lot of excitement among viewers.

"It is a splendid film and a happy realisation of my work. I am very delighted with the results, and think Arthur Pusey's work is excellent. Miss Molly Adair is very fine; she is an awfully pretty girl, and a clever actress. The two children are very charming indeed, and the scenes with the baby are wonderful. I hate the usual studio film with obvious "built-up" sets, which never succeed in getting the requisite atmosphere. The Blue Lagoon is the genuine article, with superb scenery taken on the actual locations indicated in my story. I was very much impressed by the management of the native crowds and the episode of "The Stone Man." The love scenes, in acting and photography, are the best I have ever seen in my life."

— Henry De Vere Stacpoole

On 27 February 1923, the London trade show took place. Schlesinger was present at the event and observed that nobody left during the film screening, proving its high entertainment value. Stacpoole praised the film’s acting, scenery, and management of native crowds during a post-show luncheon. He enjoyed the romantic scenes but declined the idea of a sequel that would bring Emmeline and Dick back to civilisation. Stacpoole believed that leaving them on the tropical island was the right choice. F.W. Kilner, who had exclusive distribution rights in the Midlands, criticised the film's modest promotion but praised it as an outstanding British production.

The regional trade shows of The Blue Lagoon commenced on 6 March 1923, taking place at Manchester's Theatre Royal and proceeding to various English cities, including Cardiff and Glasgow. The series of shows concluded on 11 April at Dublin's La Scala Theatre. Subsequently, on 8 October 1923, The Blue Lagoon was released in eight cinemas across London.

Although precise box office data are unavailable for evaluating the movie's financial performance, it is apparent that the movie failed to generate adequate income to persuade AFP to produce other feature films. Thelma Gutsche wrote:

The Blue Lagoon marked the swansong of local fiction film production. Released in the [South African] Union in February 1923, the film (most of which had been filmed on the Natal and Portuguese East African coast) was very favourably received. It was also successful on the overseas market; but, despite the contemporary odium of American films and attempts to sponsor British and Commonwealth production, it was obvious that South Africa’s best efforts were not assured of a payable return. Thereafter fiction film production had perforce to be abandoned.

— Thelma Gutsche

== Reception ==
Critics gave the movie generally positive reviews. Kinematograph Weekly praised the film for its ability to rekindle a feeling of magic as the story progressed, even if the ageing of the child actors caused the initial appeal to drop, and commended the accuracy with which it caught the mesmerising atmosphere of the original book. The careful selection of child actors, whose extraordinary skills added to the movie's authenticity, was one of its best aspects. The leading child actor, Val Chard, was praised for his authentic and compelling performance. The magazine also praised how the movie portrayed sexual awakening, pointing out that it added to the story's complexity and captivated the viewers.

The Rand Daily Mail reviewed it as an improvement over the novel and stage production due to the actual tropical scenes captured on the screen. The Johannesburg Sunday Times appreciated the natural acting, particularly in scenes with the two children and Paddy Button on the coral island, and the attention given to the casting of minor roles, such as the whaler's captain and crew, who looked like actual seamen.

The South African Pictorial reviewer spoke highly of the production quality, story narration, and particularly the acting, with directors William Weston Bowden and Dick Cruikshanks receiving special praise. Casting decisions were also applauded, with the younger versions of the lead characters closely resembling their older counterparts. The review did point out a subtitle that seemed to invite misplaced humour and acknowledged the original story's implausibilities but concluded that these did not detract from the film's overall quality.

The Bioscope lauded lead actors Molly Adair and Arthur Pusey for their exceptional ability to avoid theatricality in their performances. Their authentic expression of emotions and behaviour was particularly striking in the captivating island scenes. The film's young actors also earned praise for their natural and impromptu actions, contributing to its genuine feel. Additionally, the extras who played the primitive characters were commended for their skilful acting, notably during the moving dance sequence around the ancient idol that heightened the scene's mysterious atmosphere. Although the finale was deemed artificial, The Bioscope still celebrated the film's mysterious setting on an isolated island.

Ernest W. Fredman, editor of the Film Renter and Moving Picture News, commended the film for its enthralling performances and the remarkable success it garnered, surpassing the original novel and its stage adaptation. He especially praised the cast, including Arthur Pusey, Molly Adair, Dick Cruikshanks, and two genuine child actors, noting that each scene was brimming with interest and emotion. Fredman celebrated the meticulous attention to detail in the production, the poignant scenes, and the picturesque setting, all of which contributed to the film's allure, simplicity, and expected popularity. He highlighted the scene of Emmeline giving birth as exceptionally tasteful and significant. Fredman extolled the film for its poignant story of two shipwrecked children who fall in love on a deserted island, applauding its adept depiction.

The film garnered high acclaim from the London press for its precise depiction of intense emotions within unique settings. Critics anticipated that the film would exceed the accomplishments of the book it originated from and its stage adaptation. Additionally, the film was lauded for its employment of genuine natural settings and understated acting. A critic highlighted the film's distinctiveness, attributing it to the use of real-world locations over synthetic studio methods.

The film greatly impressed G.A. Atkinson, a critic for the Daily Express. Although Atkinson often felt uneasy near buildings, this sensation disappeared upon viewing the film's stunning depictions of silver beaches, palm-fringed lagoons, tropical dawns, and moonlit evenings. He noted that the film features thrilling moments like a maritime blaze, a shipwreck, an octopus battle, an encounter with cannibals, and a tropical tempest, all while weaving one of the most enchanting love stories ever depicted, rendered with elegance and charm.

The Daily Mail found fault only with Pusey's hair, which they described as "beautifully waved," given that he had supposedly lived on a desert island for seven to ten years. However, they found the film to be fresh and original. Other critics were annoyed with the makeup used on the cast. The Daily News and Leader criticised the young castaways for having "white skins" and well-groomed hair after living almost naked for so long. Jympson Harman from the London Evening News also commented on Pusey's hair, suggesting that it should have been more dishevelled. He added that the movie was faithful to the book but sometimes had slow times.

The Evening Standard critic pointed out that the movie overlooked certain anachronisms in its attention to detail, such as Arthur Pusey's impeccably groomed appearance, which went unnoticed by everyone. However, the film effectively captured the genuine atmosphere of the popular novel by employing straightforward acting and photography on an actual desert island. Additionally, the critic commended the film for preserving the delicate, poetic charm of the original novel while incorporating realistic and thrilling scenes that would make any American director proud. Alder Anderson from the Daily Telegraph stated that everyone who attended the private screening agreed that the movie was one of the best British films made by any production company. He also praised the movie for combining poetic charm with realistic, thrilling scenes that would impress any American director. This critic also championed German imports like Dr. Mabuse and The Golem as "impressionism" or expressionism, which he preferred over the "realism" of Anglo-American cinema at the time.

Reynold's News praised Bowden and Cruikshanks for excellently keeping "the spirit of the story" in their film adaptation, although they found some captions at the end "rather absurd". Lloyd's Sunday News also praised the film, stating that it retained "the beauty and simplicity of the original story" by using child actors Doreen Worfor and Val Chard, who performed their roles with refreshing naivety.

The trade journal Films happily expressed how a movie adaptation beautifully and delicately portrayed a couple's love, marriage, and baby, similar to the original book. They praised the directors for effectively using the children's emotions to convey the story. Val Chard, who played the boy, and Doreen Wonfor, who played the girl, received praise for their natural acting and for showcasing the boy's strong instincts and the girl's gentle and reflective nature subtly and believably, without being aware of the camera.

The Glasgow Herald's London correspondent reflected on how The Blue Lagoon introduced Freudian psychology to movies. The author emphasised how the worship of a stone idol impacted the two young characters and how this caused them to explore their sexuality. However, the Herald cautioned against going too far with this emotional trend.

The Sketch heralded the film as "one of the most delightful pictures ever 'shot'." The review further lauded the movie for its faithful representation of the book's narrative, a credit to the meticulous efforts of African Film Productions. The film's visuals were a particular point of praise. The Sketch review highlighted the "quite beautiful" scenery and setting, a testament to the painstaking efforts of the production team to shoot on a tropical island. Despite the considerable expense and logistical challenges this decision undoubtedly presented, the review asserted that the outcome was well worth it. The lead actors' performances were also singled out for commendation. The review described them as "admirable" in their portrayals of the characters Dick and Emmeline, suggesting that their performances contributed significantly to the film's overall success.

After being previewed at Manchester's Piccadilly Picture Theatre and Café, The Blue Lagoon received a fanciful introduction from the critic of The Manchester Guardian. The critic eloquently portrayed the film's captivating allure, beginning with a mesmerising opening scene—a serene and noiseless voyage through a vibrant coral reef that leads into a breathtakingly beautiful lagoon. To add to its charm, the critic remarked on the enchanting musical accompaniment that perfectly complemented the visuals and intensified the film's appeal.

The Weekly Dispatch praised the film as a delightful escape from the unpleasant October weather. It commended African Film Productions as the only film company in the British colonies that regularly contributed to English cinema programmes. The People recommended the film as a good example of how a subject can be treated delicately and with restraint, and they praised its innocence and charm. In a rare negative review, the Daily Herald called the film "a production without any atmosphere."

E.G. Kendrew, the London correspondent of Variety, lauded the film as a masterpiece created by a British film company, commending its fidelity to the novel and highlighting the exceptional acting. Kendrew admired the adeptness of the adapters in navigating sensitive scenes. He praised the film's tactful treatment despite narrative challenges and near-total nudity. He also lauded its realism in shipboard and fire sequences, the tropical island backdrop, and the convincing octopus fight. Kendrew highlighted the film's important place in British cinematic art.

The China Mail reviewer lauded the film for its departure from conventional studio settings. The authenticity of the outdoor scenes, filmed on an uninhabited tropical island, received particular praise. This choice closely aligned with Stacpoole’s vision and allowed the cast and crew to embrace a “simple life” during their six-month stay. This genuine experience significantly contributed to the film’s naturalness and emphasised its entertainment and pictorial qualities, particularly in the scenes set on the tropical island and lagoon.

The movie received high praise from the Singapore Free Press, highlighting the film's fidelity to the source material with minimal deviations in the ending, showcasing a commitment to the original narrative, and commending it for its outstanding production quality, described as a "triumph of marvellous photography and scenic effect." The cast, particularly child actors Doreen Wonfor and Val Chard, was lauded for delivering the best performances before the camera. The newspaper described the seamless transition to young adults as the characters aged as "masterly in its naturalness and charm."

The review for the Malaya Tribune conveyed a predominantly positive sentiment, characterising the movie as a "very beautiful picturisation" that faithfully interpreted the original novel. The review praised the film for its vivid portrayal and appropriate settings. Despite a minor deviation at the end, the reviewer assured that it did not diminish the overall interest in the story and encouraged readers to watch, calling it a "really superb photo-drama".

The Straits Times praised the movie for its faithfulness to the source material and its convincing depiction of the setting on the desert island. The British film was praised for its gentle and calming atmosphere, with commendation for the actors' departure from stereotypical roles in American cinema. Dick Cruikshanks' portrayal of the cheerful Irish character, Paddy, was particularly praised. The film's lack of intense scenes and recommendation as a form of "rest cure by proxy" made it appealing to those seeking a sense of freedom and peace.

The movie received a positive review from The Daily Telegraph in Sydney, Australia. The reviewer praised the film's original plot, exciting scenes, stunning setting, and engaging cinematography. The movie successfully combined romance with adventure and explored themes of nature and simplicity.

In a 1927 review for The Australasian, the film was praised for its unconventional production approach despite lacking elaborate studios and expensive effects. The review praised the film's joyous desert island sequences and unexpected ending, drawing comparisons to successful American independent films.

The Times praised the film as an excellent and faithful rendition of the book, with most scenes shot in stunning outdoor settings on a tropical island whose beauty was worth the effort to capture. A year later, the same newspaper's British Empire Section praised it again, citing the use of British actors and picturesque outdoor scenery as key factors in its remarkable success.

In his 2018 book Black and White Bioscope, Neil Parsons stated that the 1923 film "compares well" to later versions.

== Preservation status ==
Due to the absence of any surviving copies, The Blue Lagoon is widely regarded as a lost film. The only surviving print, which Herbert Wilcox purchased in 1929 to remake it, was destroyed in a fire at the British and Dominions Imperial Studios on 9 February 1936.

== See also ==
- The Blue Lagoon, 1949 version
- The Blue Lagoon, 1980 version
- Blue Lagoon: The Awakening, a Lifetime television movie
- Friends
- Paradise
- Return to the Blue Lagoon, 1991 version
- Paul and Virginia
- State of nature
