= Goffi =

Goffi is a surname. Notable people with the surname include:

- Cesare Goffi (1920–1995), Italian footballer
- Danilo Goffi (born 1972), Italian long-distance runner
- Emmanuel Goffi (born 1971), French Air Force officer and writer
- Maxima Goffi (born 2008), French footballer
- Nancy Augustyniak Goffi (born 1979), American soccer player
- Sara Goffi (born 1981), Italian swimmer
