= Molly Adair =

English actress (1905–1990)

- Born: Mary Marguerite Potter; 24 March 1905; Brentford, West London, England
- Died: 9 September 1990 (aged 85); Watford, Hertfordshire, England
- Occupation: actress
- Years active: 1920-1923
- Spouse: Arthur James Siggins
- Children: Jill Adams

Mary Marguerite Potter (24 March 1905 – 9 September 1990), known professionally as Molly Adair, was an English stage and silent screen actress.

== Biography ==
Adair was of Irish-American descent. She was born as Mary Marguerite Potter on 24 March 1905 in Brentford, West London, England.

Adair worked as a stage and silent screen actress. One of her earliest silent film roles was as the titular character in Stella (1921), directed by Edwin J. Collins and based on the 1904 novel Stella Fregelius by H. Rider Haggard.

When she was 17, Adair travelled to the Union of South Africa, employed by African Film Productions Ltd., to star in two film adaptations of Henry de Vere Stacpoole works. These were The Blue Lagoon (1923), directed by Dick Cruikshanks and William Bowden, and The Reef of Stars (1923), directed by Joseph Albrecht.

Adair was the mother of the actress, artist and model Jill Adams (1930–2008). She met Jill's New Zealand-born father, Arthur James Siggins, while she was filming The Blue Lagoon (1923) in Tanganyika, East Africa (now Tanzania). After completion of The Reef of Stars, Adair abandoned her acting career to raise her family. Siggins was a sergeant in the British South African Police (BSAP) in Rhodesia and later worked as an animal handler during silent film productions. The family moved to Bryn-y-Maen, near Colwyn Bay in Wales, during World War II.

Adair died on 9 September 1990 in Watford, Hertfordshire, England, aged 85.

== Selected filmography ==
Year	Title	Role	Notes
1920	A Gamble in Lives	Gladys Danvers	
1921	Stella	Stella Fregelius	
1921	The Beryl Coronet	Mary	Short film
1921	The Puppet Man	Jenny Rose	
1922	The Exclusive Model	The Girl	
1922	Sinister Street	Sylvia Scarlett	
1922	Married to a Mormon		
1923	The Blue Lagoon	Emmeline Lestrange	
1923	The Reef of Stars	Chaya/Princess Moya (Chaya's daughter)	
