= Emma Turolla =

Italian opera singer (1858–1943)

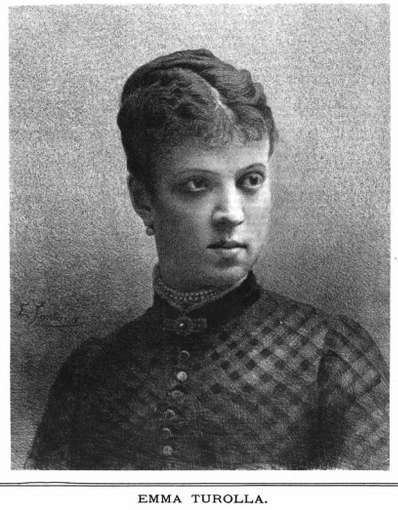
Emma Turolla, from an 1885 publication.

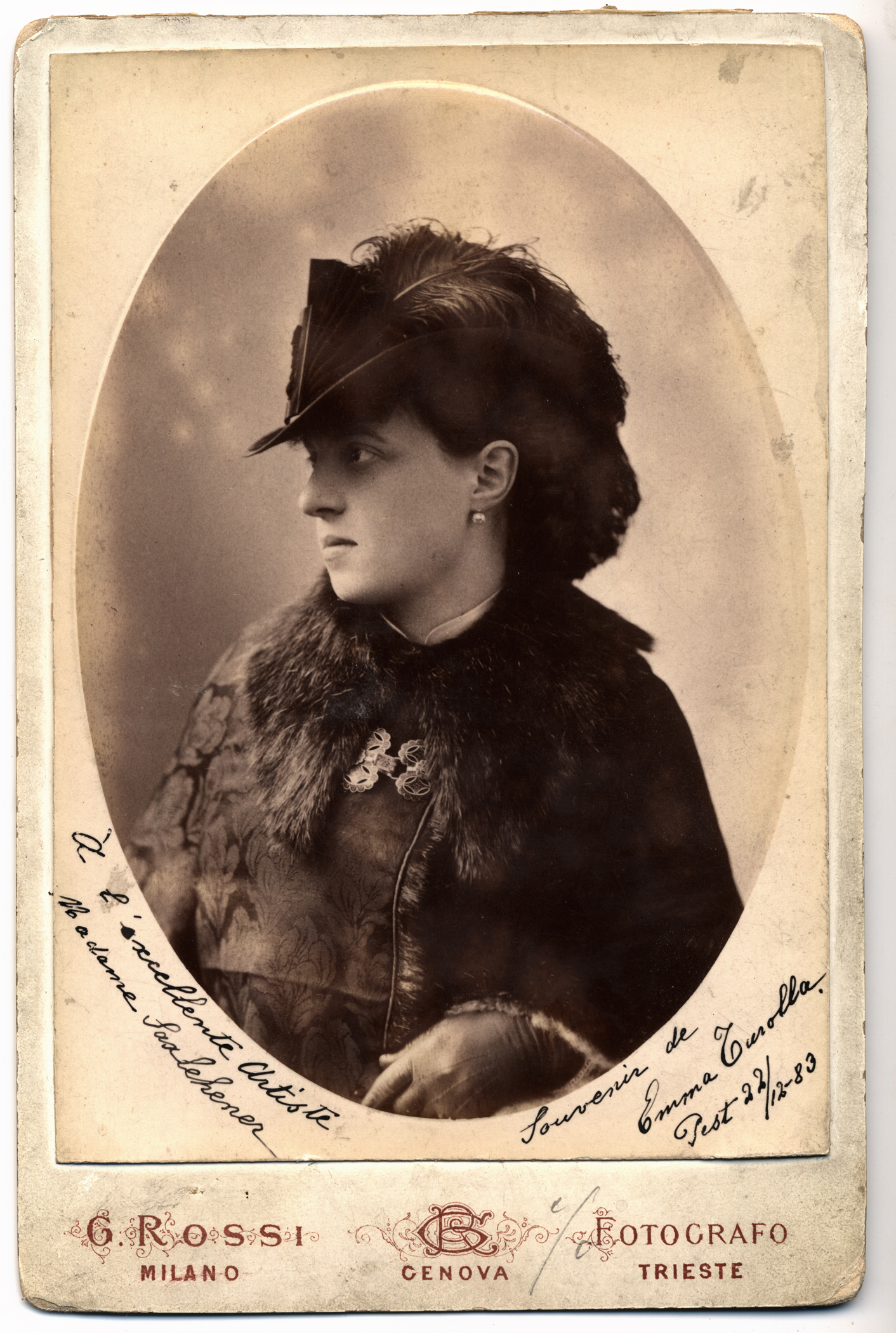
Emma Turolla

Emma Turolla (7 September 1858 – 6 June 1943) was an Italian opera singer and voice teacher.

== Early life ==
Emma Turolla was born in Turin, the daughter of Remigio Turolla and Angelica Turolla-Cravero. Her parents were also opera vocalists. She trained as a singer under Daniele Antonietti, the father of actors Hilda Anthony and Vernon Steele.

== Career ==
Turolla performed at London's Covent Garden in 1879, and again in 1880. She was with the San Carlo Theatre in Lisbon for the 1881-1882 season. She was a regular performer in Budapest, under contract at the Hungarian Royal Opera House from 1883 to 1886. She was popular in Prague in 1883, and in Vienna in the 1883–1884 season. In 1887, she toured South America. She was especially known for singing the title role in Aida and Leonora in Il Trovatore, among other parts. "La voce della Turolla è sonora e potente, senza stridi nè durezze, uniforme dai bassi agli acuti" (The voice of Turolla is sonorous and powerful, without harshness or hardness, uniform from bass to treble), commented one critic of the time. She endorsed Soden Mineral Pastilles in newspaper advertisements in 1888. In 1908, she began a singing school in Milan.

== Personal life ==
Emma Turolla left the stage in 1888, after a romantic disappointment. She was reported to have died in 1889 in Budapest. But two years later, newspapers mentioned her marriage to an Italian cavalry officer, Captain De Capitani D'Arzago, in Milan. She died in 1943, aged 84 years, in Milan.
