= The Puppet Man =

1921 film

- Directed by: Frank Hall Crane
- Written by: Cosmo Gordon Lennox (novel)
- Produced by: Edward Godal
- Starring: Hugh Miller; Molly Adair; Hilda Anthony
- Production company: British and Colonial Films
- Distributed by: British and Colonial Films; Film Booking Offices of America (US)
- Release date: August 1921
- Running time: 50 minutes
- Country: United Kingdom
- Language: English

The Puppet Man is a 1921 British silent drama film directed by Frank Hall Crane and starring Hugh Miller, Molly Adair and Hilda Anthony.

== Cast ==
- Hugh Miller as Alcide le Beau
- Molly Adair as Jenny Rose
- Hilda Anthony as Lilla Lotti
- Mane Belocci as Little Bimbo
- Harry Paulo as Joe
- Leo Fisher as Bimbo
- Johnny Reid as Bobby

== Bibliography ==
- Low, Rachael. The History of British Film, Volume 4 1918-1929. Routledge, 1997.
