= Owen Roughwood =

British actor (1876–1947)

Owen Roughwood (9 June 1876, in London – 30 May 1947, in Kent) was a British stage and film actor. He married actress Hilda Anthony in 1913.

== Selected filmography ==
- Under the Red Robe (1915)
- The Queen Mother (1916)
- The Four Just Men (1921)
- The Beloved Vagabond (1923)
