= Andrea Volpi =

Italian politician (born 1981)

Member of the Chamber of Deputies
- Incumbent
- Assumed office 18 October 2022
- Constituency: Lazio 1

Personal details
- Born: 28 April 1981 (age 45) Rome
- Party: Brothers of Italy

Andrea Volpi (born 28 April 1981) is an Italian politician of Brothers of Italy serving as member of the Chamber of Deputies and as mayor of Lanuvio. He was elected mayor in the 2022 local elections, and was elected to the Chamber of Deputies in the 2022 general election. In 2012, he was appointed coordinator pro tempore of University Action by outgoing president Giovanni Donzelli.

== Biography ==
A business consultant, he has been continuously elected to the Lanuvio City Council since 2007, also serving as a council member from 2012 to 2022 and as deputy mayor from 2017 to 2022. He was elected three consecutive times as a Metropolitan City of Rome Capital from 2015 to 2022.

On June 14, 2022, he was elected mayor of Lanuvio.

In the 2022 general election, he was elected to the Chamber of Deputies from the Lazio 1-02 multi-member district as a candidate for Fratelli d'Italia.In Parliament, he serves on the Chamber of Deputies’ XI Committee on Public and Private Employment, and is a member and the Brothers of Italy group leader on the Parliamentary Commission of Inquiry into the death of David Rossi.
