= The Queen Mother (film) =

1916 British film by Wilfred Noy

- Directed by: Wilfred Noy
- Production company: Clarendon
- Distributed by: Clarendon
- Release date: March 1916
- Country: United Kingdom
- Languages: Silent; English intertitles

The Queen Mother is a 1916 British silent adventure film directed by Wilfred Noy and starring Owen Roughwood, Gladys Mason and Barbara Rutland.

== Cast ==
- Owen Roughwood as The Duke
- Gladys Mason as Princess of Saxonia
- Barbara Rutland as Duchess Miramar
- Sydney Lewis Ransome as Prince Ludwig
- Ronald Hammond as Osric
- M. Mills as King of Montavia

== Bibliography ==
- Low, Rachael. History of the British Film, 1914-1918. Routledge, 2005.
