= Charles Tilson-Chowne =

British actor (1881–?)

Charles Tilson-Chowne (born 1881) was a British stage and film actor.

He was born in Harrow, Middlesex, England to James Henry Tilson-Chowne and Rose Alice Pope.

== Selected filmography ==
- The Four Just Men (1921)
- A Dear Fool (1921)
- The Loudwater Mystery (1921)
- In Full Cry (1921)
- The Marriage Lines (1921)
- Sinister Street (1922)
- The Game of Life (1922)
