= Little Lady Eileen =

1916 film by J. Searle Dawley

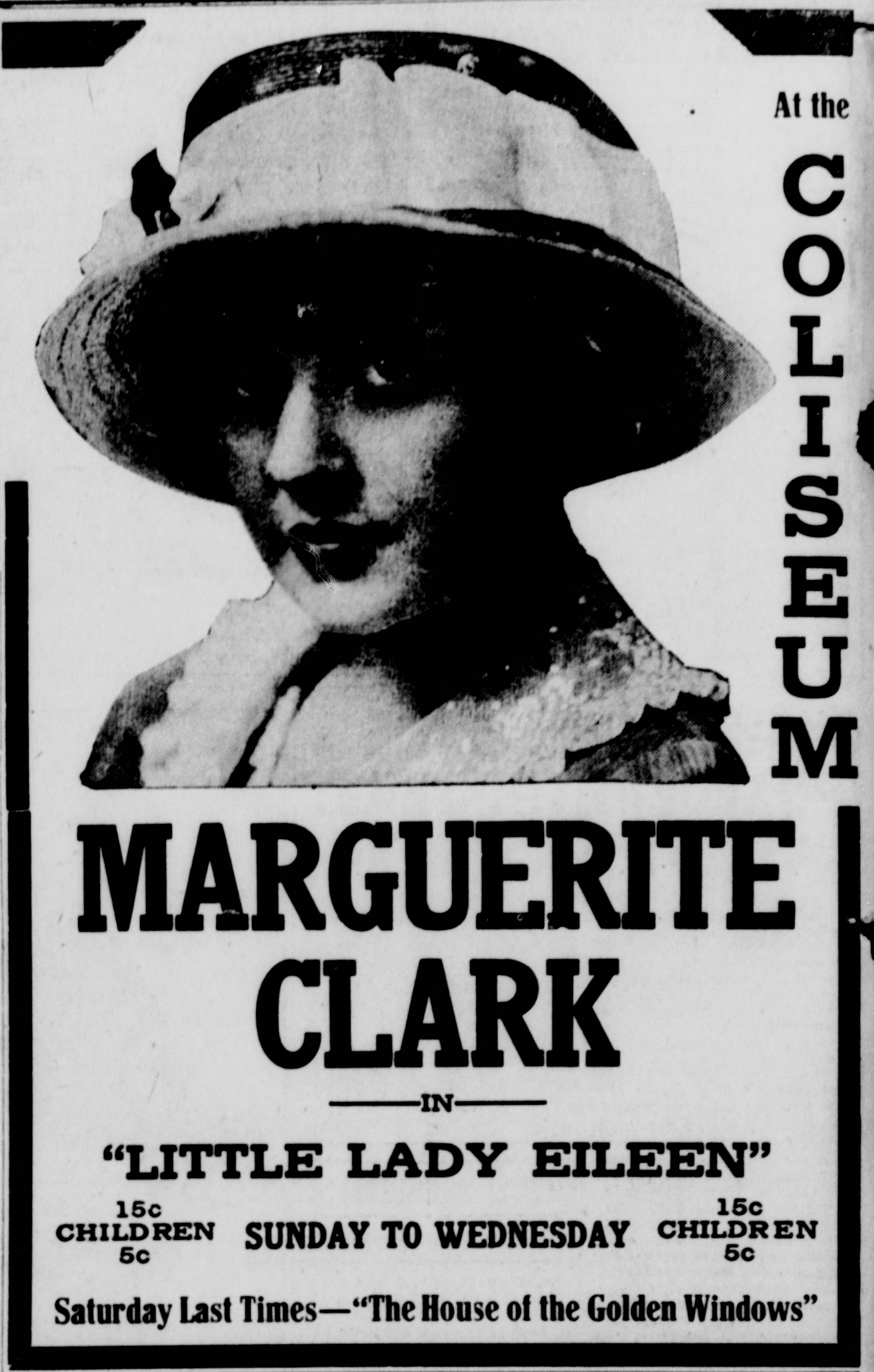
- Newspaper advertisement
- Directed by: J. Searle Dawley
- Written by: Betty T. Fitzgerald (story & scenario) ?Edmund Goulding(co-wr. scenario)
- Produced by: Adolph Zukor
- Starring: Marguerite Clark; Vernon Steele
- Cinematography: Lawrence E. Williams
- Distributed by: Paramount Pictures
- Release date: August 3, 1916
- Running time: 5 reels
- Country: USA
- Languages: Silent; English intertitles

Little Lady Eileen is a lost 1916 American silent fantasy drama film starring Marguerite Clark. It was directed by J. Searle Dawley and produced by Adolph Zukor.

The film uses double exposure photography to allow Vernon Steele to play two different characters within the same shot.

== Cast ==
- Marguerite Clark – Eileen Kavanaugh
- Vernon Steele – Stanley Churchill/Sir George Churchill
- John L. Shine – Eileen's father
- J.K. Murray – Father Kearney
- Harry Lee – Powdein
- Maggie Fisher – Lady Gower
- Russell Bassett – Mike Cafferty
