= Lanuvio =

- Comune
- Comune di Lanuvio
- View of Lanuvio

- Coat of arms

- Location within Italy Location within Lazio
- Coordinates: 41°41′N 12°42′E
- Country: Italy
- Region: Lazio
- Metropolitan city: Rome (RM)
- Frazioni: Campoleone, Bellavista, Colle Cavaliere, Casale della Corte, Malcavallo, Mantovano, Monte Giove, Pascolare, Pietrara, Sambuco, Stragonello

Government
  - Mayor: Andrea Volpi (FdI)

Area
  - Total: 43.9 km^{2} (16.9 sq mi)
- Elevation: 324 m (1,063 ft)

Population (1 January 2017)
  - Total: 13,605
  - Density: 310/km^{2} (803/sq mi)
- Demonym: Civitani
- Time zone: UTC+1 (CET)
  - Summer (DST): UTC+2 (CEST)
- Postal code: 00075
- Dialing code: 06
- Patron saint: St. Peter the Apostle
- Saint day: April 7
- Website: Official website

Lanuvio is a comune (municipality) in the Metropolitan City of Rome in the Italian region of Latium, located about 30 kilometres (19 mi) southeast of Rome, on the Alban Hills.

Lanuvio borders the following municipalities: Aprilia, Ariccia, Genzano di Roma, Velletri.

== History ==
In ancient times Lanuvium was an important town in the hinterland of Imperial Rome. The emperors Antoninus Pius and Commodus were born here. It decayed after the reign of Theodosius I (late 4th century AD), and was mostly abandoned due to the shutting down of its polytheistic sanctuaries.

It is mentioned again in the 11th century, when it was a seat of a Benedictine monastery. In the early 15th century it was acquired by the Colonna family, to whom it belonged until 1564.

On 17 February 1944, during World War II, it was bombed by sea and air by the Allies, and almost entirely destroyed.

== Main sights ==
- Collegiate church
- Sanctuary of Madonna delle Grazie
- History center with walls, including four towers
- Temple of Juno Sospita
- Remains of the ancient Roman bridge Ponte Loreto
- Regional Park of the Castelli Romani
- Civic Museum of Lanuvio

== Notable people ==
- Vincenzo Seratrice the Elder (1851–1922), painter

== Twin towns ==
- Centuripe, Italy
