= Sinister Street (film) =

British silent film by George Beranger

- Directed by: George Beranger
- Written by: Arthur Q. Walton
- Based on: Sinister Street by Compton Mackenzie
- Starring: John Stuart; Amy Verity; Maudie Dunham; Charles Tilson-Chowne
- Production company: Ideal Films
- Distributed by: Ideal Films
- Release date: 1922
- Country: United Kingdom
- Language: English

Sinister Street is a 1922 British silent drama film directed by George Beranger and starring John Stuart, Amy Verity, and Maudie Dunham. It was adapted from the 1913–14 novel Sinister Street by Compton MacKenzie.

== Cast ==
- John Stuart as Michael Fane
- Amy Verity as Stella Fane
- Maudie Dunham as Lily Haden
- Molly Adair as Sylvia Scarlett
- Charles Tilson-Chowne as Lord Saxby
- Roger Tréville as George Ayliff
- Kate Carew as Mrs. Fane
- A.G. Poulton
- Wilfred Fletcher
- John Reid
- Kathleen Blake
- Marjorie Day
