= Vincenzo Seratrice the Elder =

Italian painter (1851–1922)

Vincenzo Seratrice the Elder (1851–1922) was an Italian painter, mainly of genre paintings, archaeologist, antiquarian and furniture maker.

He was born in Turin to an aristocratic family with connections to the court of Savoy; his father worked with Count Cavour. Adventurous, he abandoned his family and joined a travelling band of acrobats. After much travelling, he married and settled in Lanuvio, working as a furniture maker.

Beyond his work as a sculptor, he helped design of ceremonial costumes for the court of Savoy. He is known to have sold furniture he made as if they were antique originals. He was interested in archaeology, and held the position of Honorary Inspector for Monuments and Ruins from 1880 to 1912. He documented with photographs the archaeologic dig by British Ambassador Lord Savile Lumley of the perimeter of the sanctuary of Juno Sospita in the Forum Holitorium

He collected dozens of ancient Roman inscriptions which were all published in journals of epigraphy. He uncovered evidence of the 13th-century Vassalletto family of marble carvers of the thirteenth century, who helped carve the columns of a choir in the Church of Santa Maria Maggiore, Rome. In 1907, while the Church was being restored, one of the stones from the floor of the main altar carried the name of the famous marble craftsman Vassalletto.

He was a resident of Rome for many years. Among his works at the 1881 Exhibition of Fine Arts in Milan are: Lucky Journey; Il Novizio; Ritorno forzato; and La scaccia cornacchie. At the 1883 Exposition of Rome, he exhibited: Le nostre Segarole.

He died in 1922 in Lanuvio.
