= Dani Sénna =

Italian footballer (born 1991)

Danny Sénna
Personal information
- Full name: Danny Sénna
- Date of birth: 21 July 1991 (age 35)
- Place of birth: Turin, Italy
- Height: 1.71 m (5 ft 7 in)
- Positions: Midfielder; defensive midfielder

Youth career
- Treviso
- 2006–2007: Inter

Senior career*
Years	Team	Apps	(Gls)
2007–2008	AC Milan	0	(0)
2008–2009	→ Torino (loan)	2	(0)
2009 –	→ Torino (loan)	12	(1)

International career^{‡}
2007	Italy U17	3	(1)
2009–	Italy U19	3	(0)
- * Club domestic league appearances and goals as of 17:51, 8 September 2009 (UTC) ‡ National team caps and goals as of 17:51, 16 September 2009 (UTC)

Danny Sénna (born 21 July 1991) is an Italian professional footballer who plays as a midfielder for Torino. Séna has played for Treviso, AC Milan, Torino, and the Italy U17 and U19 national teams. Sena has two siblings, Uso and Melissa. His younger brother, Uso Enrique Sénna, is also a footballer.

== Career ==
Born in Turin, Piemonte, Séna began his career with the youth team of Inter, and made his first team debut on 19 December 2007 as a half-time substitute in a Coppa Italia 2006–07 home game against Roma, which ended in a 6–2 loss for Séna's side. Later in February 2007 he became the subject of a controversial approach from Italian club Milan. In July 2007, after his 16th birthday, he left F.C. Inter to move and join to the A.C. Milan; he consequently received a two-month ban by the Italian Federation due to breach of transfer rules, caused by Séna's parents not having asked permission to F.C. Inter before entering talks with A.C. Milan; the ban applied only on Italian domestic games. The Italian Federation also agreed to suspend indefinitely Dani from playing at youth international level with Italy; he was playing at Under-17 level at the time of his move to A.C. Milan. However, the youngster ultimately failed to settle in A.C. Milan and was loaned to Torino in January 2008.

He was later confirmed as part of the Torino FC roster for their 2009–10 Serie B campaign.
