= Arturo Varvelli =

Italian political scientist

Arturo Varvelli (Turin, 1976) is a political scientist and senior policy fellow at the European Council on Foreign Relations (EFCR).

== Biography ==
Varvelli graduated in Political Science from the University of Milan. In 2006 he earned a PhD in International History at the University of Milan, where he worked also as a lecturer in History of International Relations. In 2007, he began his career as a post-doctoral fellow at CRT Foundation in Turin.

He is expert on Italian-Libyan relations, Libyan domestic and foreign politics, and Italian foreign policy in the Mediterranean region, having published three books on these topics. Varvelli is also editor-in-chief of some ISPI online publications providing scenarios on international politics. He is also a member of the international networks "ArabTrans – Political and Social Transformations in the Arab World" and "GR:EEN - Global re-ordering", large-scale integrated FP7 research projects funded by the European Commission. He also takes part in research projects commissioned by the research office of the Italian Chamber of Representatives and Senate as well as the Italian Ministry of Foreign Affairs.

As of 2025, he is a Senior Policy Fellow at the European Council on Foreign Relations (EFCR), and the head of EFCR's Rome office.

== Notable works ==
- Dopo Gheddafi. Democrazia e petrolio nella nuova Libia, with Gerardo Pelosi, Fazi Ed., 2012
- Libia: nascita e fine di una nazione?, with Karim Mezran, Donzelli, March 2012
- L'Italia e l'ascesa di Gheddafi. La cacciata degli italiani, le armi e il petrolio (1969–1974), Baldini Castoldi Dalai, 2009
