= Enrico Martino =

Italian photojournalist

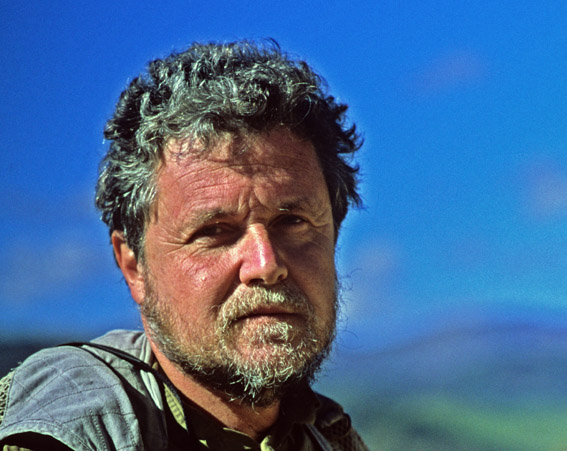
Enrico Martino

Enrico Martino (born 16 January 1948) is an Italian photojournalist.

== Biography ==
Enrico Martino was born in Turin, Italy, and has been a freelance photojournalist since 1971, He covered the Yom Kippur War in 1973, the Sahel famine in 1984, the first elections in the German Democratic Republic, Hungary, and Romania after the Berlin Wall fell in 1990, and the Gulf War in 1991,. He also was the first Italian photojournalist to report on United States Marine Corps training at Marine Corps Recruit Depot Parris Island, South Carolina, in the United States.

After 1985, Martino specialized in geographic reporting, with special attention to social and cultural aspects. His work in recent years is characterized by special attention to Latin America with a strong specialization in Mexico, where he has reported frequently on indigenous peoples. He has published books in Italy and France and had personal exhibitions in Turin, Rome, Palermo, Padua, Mexico City, Acapulco, Buenos Aires, Berlin, and Chicago. He has had stories published internationally in publications such as Elle, Marie Claire, Merian, Der Spiegel, Die Zeit, GEO, Jeune Afrique, Rutas del Mundo, Meridiani, “D” di Repubblica, Epoca, L'espresso, Panorama, Atlante, Europeo, Focus, Gente Viaggi, In Viaggio, Airone, Panorama Travel, Sette, Traveller, and Tuttoturismo. He has also collaborated with the Mexico City-based Caritas charity organization on a wide-ranging visual communications project.

Martino's photographs are preserved at the British Museum in London and by the United Nations High Commissioner for Refugees in Geneva.

== Books ==
- Liguria (A. Mondadori, 1984)
- L’anima degli indios (“Indian Soul”, EGA, Torino, 1992)
- Gente chiamata Torino (EGA, 1996)
- Messico (Idealibri, Milano, 1996)
- Borgogna di pietra (Idealibri, Milano, 1998)
- Italie (collective book, Vilo, Paris 2003)

Martino also has contributed to many publishing houses and guidebooks.

== Exhibitions ==
- Reporter' 70, Turin 1979
- I 35 giorni, Turin 1980
- Turismo e centri d'arte, Milan 1981
- Chiapas, Palermo, Messina, Catania, Padua 1992
- Baja California, Mexico City, Querétaro, Acapulco, Buenos Aires, Berlin, Milan, Rome 1994-1995
- Gente di Torino, Turin 1997

== Awards ==
Martino has received two Lentes de Plata and three Plumas de Plata, Mexico′s highest award for travel and cultural stories, presented personally by the President of Mexico.
