= Stella (1921 film) =

1921 film

- Directed by: Edwin J. Collins
- Written by: H. Rider Haggard (novel); Edwin J. Collins
- Starring: Molly Adair; H. Manning Haynes; Charles Vane
- Production company: Master Films
- Distributed by: Butcher's Film Service
- Release date: April 1921
- Running time: 55 minutes
- Country: United Kingdom
- Languages: Silent; English intertitles

Stella is a 1921 British silent drama film directed by Edwin J. Collins and starring Molly Adair, H. Manning Haynes and Charles Vane. It is based on the 1904 novel Stella Fregelius by H. Rider Haggard.

== Cast ==
- Molly Adair as Stella Fregelius
- H. Manning Haynes as Maurice Cook
- Charles Vane as Colonel Monk
- Betty Farquhar as Mary Porson
- Wilfred Fletcher as Stephen Lanyard
- Mildred Evelyn as Eliza Lanyard

== Bibliography ==
- Low, Rachael. History of the British Film, 1918-1929. George Allen & Unwin, 1971.
