= Hilda Anthony =

British actress

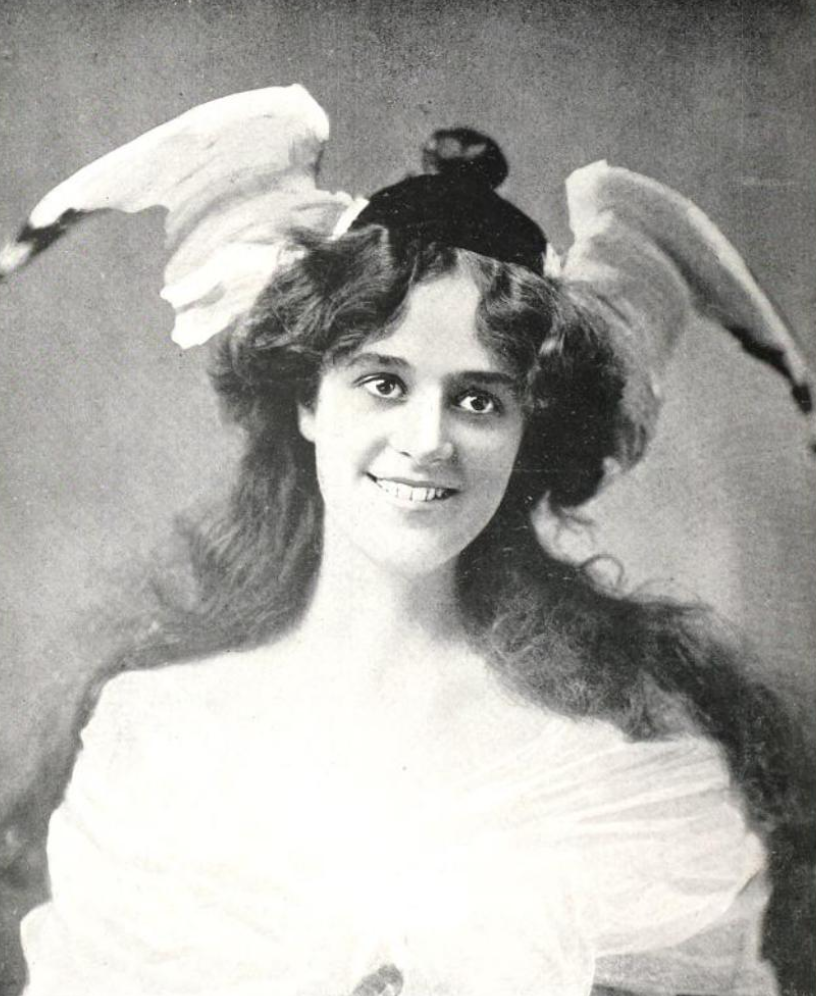
- Hilda Anthony, from a 1904 publication.
- Born: Hilda Madeline Elizabeth Antonietti; 13 July 1886; Santiago, Chile
- Died: 17 April 1962 (aged 75); Hampstead, London
- Occupations: Stage and silent film actress
- Spouse: Owen Roughwood (d. 1947)
- Relatives: Vernon Steele(brother)

Hilda Anthony (born Hilda Madeline Elizabeth Antonietti; 13 July 1886 – 17 April 1962), also seen as Hilda Antony, was a British actress born in Chile. She appeared in four silent films and many stage productions in London.

== Early life ==
Hilda Madeline Elizabeth Antonietti was born in Santiago, Chile, the daughter of Daniele Antonietti and Grace Emma Bolton Antonietti. Her father was an Italian professor of music and opera director. Her mother was British-born and also a musician. Her brother, Arturo Romeo Antonietti, also became an actor, using the stage name "Vernon Steele". Another brother, Aldo Antonietti, was a violinist and composer.

== Career ==
Silent films featuring Hilda Anthony include Married Life (1921), The Puppet Man (1921), The Cardboard Box (1923, one of The Last Adventures of Sherlock Holmes films), and What the Butler Saw (1924).

On the London stage she appeared in vaudeville and in Alice in Wonderland (1900–1901), Scrooge (1901, 1903), A Little Un-Fairy Princess (1902–1903), A Privy Council (1905), The Beauty of Bath (1906–1907), Pro Tem (1908), Stingaree, the Bushranger (1908) with Henry Ainley, Paid in Full (1908), The Education of Elizabeth (1908), Beethoven (1910, again with Henry Ainley), Orpheus on the Underground (1911), Autumn Manoeuvres (1912), Joseph and his Brethren (1913), Jerry (1916), Almond Eye (1923–1924), Murder in Mayfair (1934–1935), and Comedienne (1938).

== Personal life ==
Hilda Anthony married fellow actor Owen Roughwood, in 1913. She was widowed when he died in 1947. Hilda Anthony died in Hampstead, London in 1962, aged 75 years.
