= Vernon Steele =

British actor

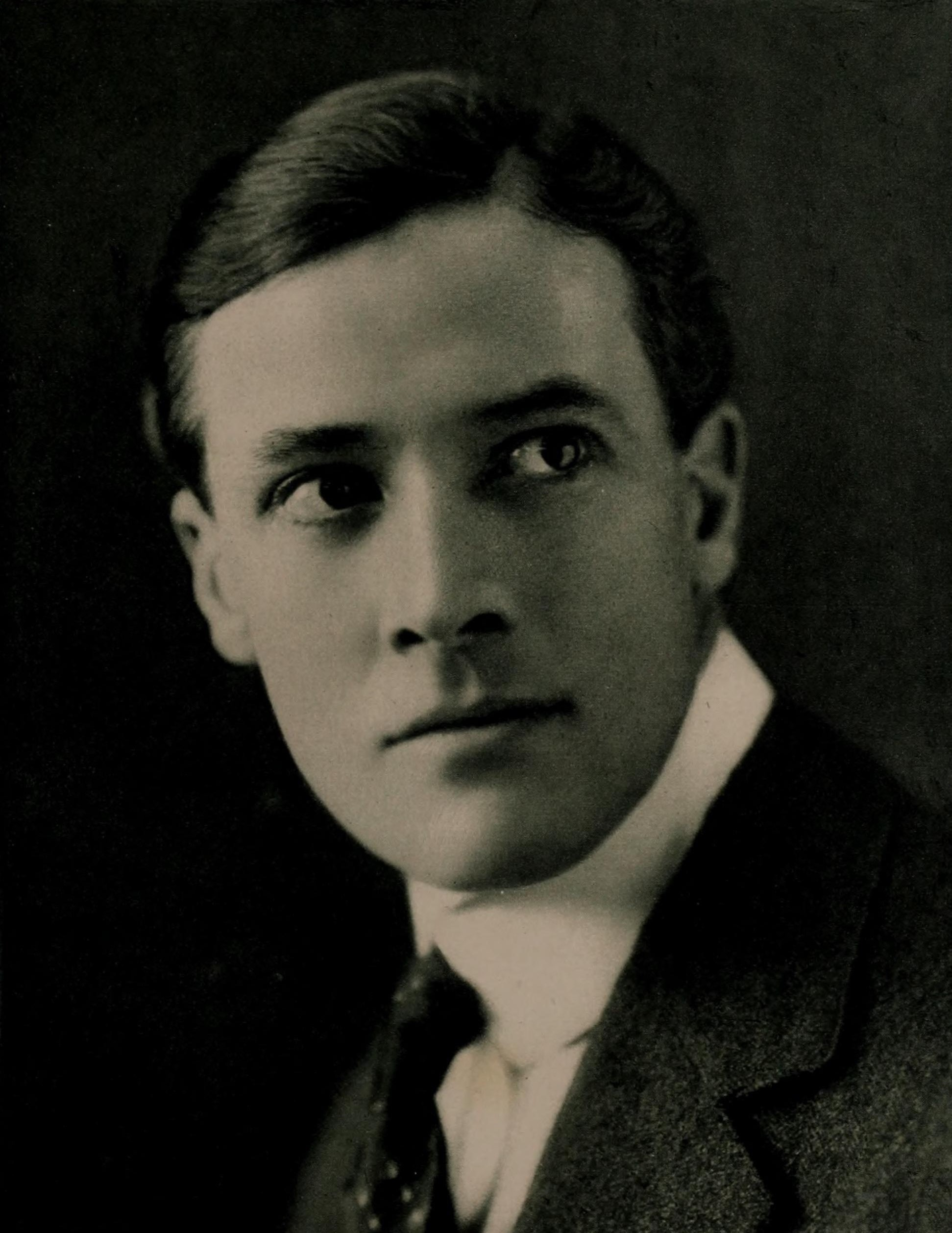
- Steele in 1917
- Born: Arturo Romeo Antonietti; 18 September 1882; Santiago, Chile
- Died: 23 July 1955 (aged 72); Los Angeles, California, U.S.
- Occupation: Actor
- Years active: 1906-1949 (including stage years)
- Spouse: Vivia Steele
- Relatives: Hilda Anthony

Vernon Steele (born Arturo Romeo Antonietti; 18 September 1882 – 23 July 1955) was a Chilean-born British actor known for his appearances on the Broadway stage and in American films. He often played patrician young men in silent films. Steele was born in Santiago, Chile, the son of Daniel Antonietti, a professor of music, and his English wife, the former Grace Emma Bolton. Vernon Steele was christened Arturo Romeo Antonietti and his family eventually settled in London, England. His sister was the actress Hilda Anthony.

== Filmography ==
- Hearts in Exile (1915) as Paul Pavloff (film debut)
- The Vampire (1915) as Robert Sterling
- Her Great Match (1915) as Prince Adolph
- The Stubbornness of Geraldine (1915)
- The Supreme Sacrifice (1916) as Reverend Philip Morton
- Silks and Satins (1916) as Jacques Desmond
- Little Lady Eileen (1916) as Stanley Churchill/Sir George Churchill
- Polly of the Circus (1917) as John Douglas the Minister
- Bab's Matinee Idol (1917) as Adrian Egleston
- Fields of Honor (1918) as Robert Vorhis
- The Panther Woman (1918) as Beverly Peale
- The Eternal Magdalene (1919) as The Preacher
- The Firing Line (1919) as John Garret 'Garry' Hamil III
- The Witness for the Defense (1919) as Dick Hazelwood
- The Phantom Honeymoon (1919) as Captain Bob Tidewater
- The Mind the Paint Girl (1919) as Lord Francombe
- Human Desire (1919) as Jasper Norton
- His House in Order (1920) as Hillary Jesson
- The Highest Bidder (1921) as Hastings
- Out of the Chorus (1921) as Ross Van Beekman
- Beyond Price (1921) as Philip Marrio
- A Wonderful Wife (1922) as Alaric Lewin
- When the Devil Drives (1922) as Robert Taylor
- For the Defense (1922) as Christopher Armstrong
- The Hands of Nara (1922) as Adam Pine
- The Girl Who Ran Wild (1922) as The Schoolmaster
- Thelma (1922) as Sir Phillip Errington
- The Danger Point (1922) as Duncan Phelps
- Temptation (1923) as John Hope
- Alice Adams (1923) as Arthur Russell
- What Wives Want (1923) as Austin Howard
- Forgive and Forget (1923) as Ronnie Sears
- The Wanters (1923) as Tom Armstrong
- Discontented Husbands (1924) as Jack Ballard
- The House of Youth (1924) as Rhodes Winston
- Big News (1929) as Reporter
- The King's Vacation (1933) as Mac Barstow
- The Silk Express (1933) as Dr. Harold Rolph
- Design for Living (1933) as Douglas' First Manager (uncredited)
- Where Sinners Meet (1934) as Saunders - the Chauffeur
- The Great Flirtation (1934) as Bigelow
- Bulldog Drummond Strikes Back (1934) as Wedding Guest (uncredited)
- Bonnie Scotland (1935) as Col. Gregor McGregor
- Te quiero con locura (1935) as Dr. Preston
- I Found Stella Parish (1935) as Slave in Play (uncredited)
- No matarás (1935)
- Captain Blood (1935) as King James
- Dracula's Daughter (1936) as Squires (uncredited)
- Lloyd's of London (1936) as Sir Thomas Lawrence
- Time Out for Romance (1937) as Count Michael Montaine
- Step Lively, Jeeves! (1937) as Lord Fenton (uncredited)
- Kidnapped (1938) as Captain
- Flight to Fame (1938) as Officer (uncredited)
- North of the Yukon (1939) as RCMP Insp. Wylie
- The Witness Vanishes (1939) as Nigel Partridge
- Mrs. Miniver (1942) as Glee Club Member (uncredited)
- Riders of the Northwest Mounted (1943) as Captain Blair (uncredited)
- They Were Expendable (1945) as Army Doctor
- The Lone Wolf in London (1947) as Sir John Klemscott
- To the Ends of the Earth (1948) as Commissioner Lionel Hadley (uncredited)
- Joan of Arc (1948) as Boy's Father (uncredited)
- Madame Bovary (1949) as Priest (final film)
