= Luigi Ferdinando Dagnese =

Italian novelist based in Turin

Luigi Ferdinando Dagnese is an Italian novelist based in Turin. He is the author of a novel in English, The Book of Breathing, that appeared first in Italian as Il libro del respiro, as well as of another novel in Italian, L’imbarazzo della scelta, and an essay on Marcel Proust, Alla ricerca del tempo sprecato.

== Works ==
The Book of Breathing is the title of an ancient papyrus that revealed the exorcisms that enabled the souls of the dead to breathe in their crossing of the Realm of the Night. Gian, the novel's protagonist, has undertaken the translation of this manuscript. He lives in Palo Alto, the capital of the IT corporate world, and is in love with Dalya, a woman distraught by bereavement over her older brother's death. For the last several weeks, Dalya has been refusing herself to him. She has become the follower of a guru, J. J. Bernhard, who claims that his yoga discipline, centred on sexual abstinence, enables his pupils to stop the flow of time and suspend death. Gian has another rival in Dalya's Japanese husband, Seto, an IT executive who dreams of immortalizing his own mind's powers by means of some technological invention. In his frantic attempts to get Dalya back, Gian comes to realize that his actions follow one another like the tassels of a diabolic mosaic; it's as if his willpower was dominated by the very secrets he is stealing from the Book of Breathing. In order to assuage Dalya's mourning, he has undertaken to fit out the perfect tomb on the shores of the ocean, an empty tomb housing the ghost of her brother. It is from within this tomb that the shades of the night, invisible and inescapable, lead him to the destruction of his two rivals. In the end, Gian discovers that his struggle for Dalya's heart and body is ruled by a ruthless and mournful love, a love that is not of this earth.

Alla ricerca del tempo sprecato: L’idillio tumultuoso di Marcel Proust e Lionel Hauser tells of the innumerable financial and sentimental vicissitudes that turned Proust into an extraordinary writer. Lionel Hauser was Proust's closest financial advisor and one of his most devoted friends. Through the years, this friendship was put to a harsh test by the banker's disapproval of Proust's risky financial transactions and conspicuous expenses. To this day, Hauser's negative opinion is shared by the writer's biographers; they argue unanimously that Proust squandered his money, either on reckless speculations or on extravagant gifts to men and women who struck his fancy, and they draw incorrect biographical conclusions from it. Dagnese's book describes and documents in solid detail the Phoenix-like rebirth of Proust's finances after the First World War, when, year after year, both his portfolio and his royalties turned a substantial profit. Lionel Hauser had a profound dislike for wasted time; to him, time came in scarce quantities, like currency, liquidity, gold, and rare merchandise, and should therefore be either frugally saved or profitably invested. In Hauser's eyes, Proust, who spent most of his time in bed, was the personification of wasted time; he even became its eulogist once he began publishing volume after volume of a massive novel, In Search of Lost Time, devoted, precisely, to the ineffectual passing of time. In contrast, Proust conceived of the “lost time” that is the subject of his novel as the sextant of human existence, the measure of our adjustment to its transiency. To the writer, the passing of time was not ineluctable but rather reversible, because the future offered him the opportunity to turn the disjointed events from his past into a new cohesive whole. The polemic about wasted time affected the harshest conflicts between Proust and Hauser. In the end, Hauser had to face the evidence that his zero-sum-game theory was inadequate to explain Proust's resourceful usage of time and money.

== Bibliography ==
- Luigi Ferdinando Dagnese, The Book of Breathing. Roma: Robin ePub, 2012.
- Luigi Ferdinando Dagnese, Il libro del respiro. Roma: Robin Edizioni, 2011; Robin ePub, 2012.
- Luigi Ferdinando Dagnese, Alla ricerca del tempo sprecato: l’idillio burrascoso di Marcel Proust e Lionel Hauser. Roma: Robin Edizioni, 2012.
- Luigi Ferdinando Dagnese, L’imbarazzo della scelta. Roma: Robin ePub, 2012.
- Gerald Gillespie, "Commentary to The Book of Breathing," http://www.ebook.it/S/Robin_Edizioni/Luigi_Ferdinando_Dagnese/Narrativa/Mobi/The_Book_of_Breathing.html
- Gillespie, Gerald. Essay/Review: “Luigi Ferdinando Dagnese, Alla ricerca del tempo sprecato: L’idillio burrascoso di Marcel Proust e Lionel Hauser.” Recherche littèraire/Literary Research, Vol. 29, Ns. 57-58 (Summer 2013): 11- 26. https://www.academia.edu/5015973/Disclosures_A_Report_on_the_World_Literature_Association_and_the_Institute_for_World_Literature
- Grande, La Stampa: "Quando i bruchi della mela iniziano a mangiare la foglia." http://www.lastampa.it/Page/Id/1.0.193354475.
