= Carlo Bodro =

Italian composer

Carlo Bodro was born in Albiano d'Ivrea (Piemonte, Italy) on 4 October 1841. The last pieces of evidence of his activity are pointed out in Rome, where he presumably died after 1900. He does not appear in main Italian biographic dictionaries.

He was the son of an organ builder in Albiano, and a pupil of Bernardo Barasa, organist of the cathedral of Ivrea. First, as organist in Albiano, he settled at Cuneo (Piemonte) in about 1880 or slightly before, and opened a school of music.

He published organ and piano pieces by 1881 in Cuneo, and then in Turin from 1884 to 1897. His works are also edited by other publishers in Turin and even in Milan.
