= Cesare Nay =

Italian footballer (1925-1994)

Personal information
- Date of birth: October 22, 1925
- Place of birth: Turin, Italy
- Date of death: August 8, 1994 (aged 68)
- Place of death: Turin, Italy
- Position: Midfielder

Senior career*
Years	Team	Apps	(Gls)
1946–1947	Carrarese	35	(0)
1947–1948	Spezia	24	(2)
1948–1949	Lucchese	35	(0)
1949–1954	Torino	137	(0)
1954–1955	Triestina	30	(0)
1955–1957	Juventus	59	(0)
- * Club domestic league appearances and goals

Cesare Nay (October 22, 1925 – August 8, 1994) was an Italian professional football player. He was born and died in Turin.
