= Franco Morzone =

Italian footballer

Personal information
- Date of birth: 7 September 1918
- Place of birth: Turin, Kingdom of Italy
- Position: Striker

Senior career*
Years	Team	Apps	(Gls)
1939–1940	Juventus	1	(0)
- * Club domestic league appearances and goals

Franco Morzone (born 7 September 1918) was an Italian professional football player. He was born in Turin.
