= Cesare Goffi =

Italian footballer (1920-1995)

Personal information
- Date of birth: May 5, 1920
- Place of birth: Turin, Italy
- Date of death: February 20, 1995 (aged 74)
- Place of death: Turin, Italy
- Position: Goalkeeper

Senior career*
Years	Team	Apps	(Gls)
1937–1939	Casale	20	(0)
1939–1940	Cosenza		
1940–1942	Juventus	7	(0)
1942–1943	Padova	15	(0)
1943–1944	Biellese	8	(0)
1944–1945	Istituto Sociale Torino		
1945–1946	Cuneo	9	(0)
1946–1950	Catania		
1951–1954	Marsala	63	(0)
1954–1955	Ivrea	4	(0)
- * Club domestic league appearances and goals

Cesare Goffi (May 5, 1920 in Turin – February 20, 1995 in Turin) was a Italian professional footballer who played as a goalkeeper.

== Honours ==
Juventus

- Coppa Italia winner: 1941–42.

== See also ==
- Football in Italy
- List of football clubs in Italy
