= Stella Fregelius =

1904 novel by H. Rider Haggard

Stella Fregelius: A Tale of Three Destinies
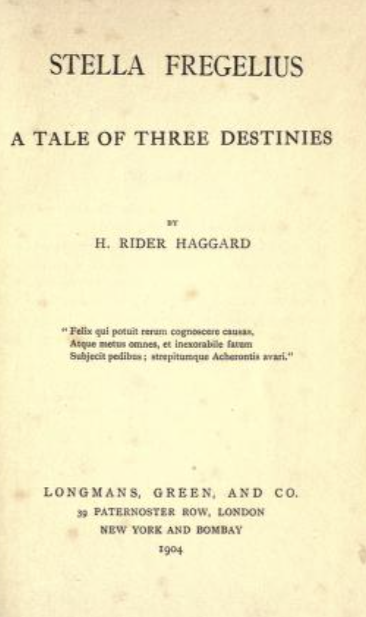
- Title page for Stella Fregelius: A Tale of Three Destinies (1904)
- Author: H. Rider Haggard
- Language: English
- Genre: novel
- Published: 1904 Longmans
- Publication place: United Kingdom

Stella Fregelius: A Tale of Three Destinies is a 1904 novel by the British writer H. Rider Haggard about a young inventor who falls in love with a mysterious stranger while he is engaged to another woman. As a novelist, Haggard is known primarily for his adventure novels. Among his most widely read and critically acclaimed novels are King Solomon's Mines, Allan Quatermain and She. After his publication of She, Haggard wrote at least one novel a year every year until his death in 1925.

== Historical background and literary context ==
The publication of Stella Fregelius: A Tale of Three Destinies appears on Haggard's timeline of works in 1903 – immediately after Pearl-Maiden (1903) and directly preceding The Brethren (1904). At the time of publishing, Haggard had returned from Africa and was heavily involved with the politics of agriculture reform and spent a lot of time focusing his writings on his observations and experiences while travelling across the rural UK As Haggard points out in the author's note at the beginning of the text, he began writing the book around 1898, about 5 years before its release. Haggard also says that he had no intention of publishing the story at first, starting it "purely to please himself" and ultimately publishing it "in the hope that it may please some others". While many of Haggard's novels take place in Africa, Stella Fregelius is one of Haggard's domestically set novels. Of the two basic types of novels he wrote, Haggard's African adventure novels were praised much more than his domestic romances. Stella Fregelius, however, was met with widely positive reviews as its spiritual and philosophical content differed greatly from his other books in this category.

== Plot summary ==
As the title suggests, Stella Fregelius: a Tale of Three Destinies is a story of the overlapping fates of three people in a northern coastal region of England. The story follows Morris Monk, an aspiring inventor, as he becomes engaged to his first cousin, Mary Porson, and soon complicates things by falling in love with the daughter of the new church rector, Stella Fregelius. As Morris has prior engagements in this lifetime, he and Stella dedicate their afterlives to one another in a spiritual marriage. Shortly after, Stella dies and Morris spends the next few years trying to contact her spirit before dying of exhaustion.

At the beginning of the story, Morris is toiling with his biggest invention: the aerophone. In a form that resembles the earliest phones, Morris designed the aerophone in an attempt to revolutionise the world of communication by allowing two people to speak to each other from miles apart. Morris spent six years on it before it worked. After its initial success, however, he could not repeat the results, so he spends the next two years trying to make the finishing touches. Meanwhile, Morris' father, Colonel Monk, is struggling with the mortgage on the Monksland Estate. As a retired soldier who lost his wife years ago, Colonel Monk hardly even manages to pay the interest on his mortgages. To stabilise the situation, Mr. Porson, Morris' uncle and the Colonel's wealthy brother-in-law, takes over the debt as a creditor. The main conflict of the book arises when the Colonel suggests that Morris should marry a wealthy woman to help ease the financial burden. Morris shows no interest in females, being described as "afraid of women". His interest is piqued, however, when his father suggests marrying Mary Porson, Morris' first cousin. While Morris still is not very enthusiastic about the idea of being married, he realises how well he and his cousin get along. Seeing as she is very attractive, quite intelligent and extremely supportive of Morris' endeavours as an inventor, Morris agrees to marry her if the Colonel can prove that she is interested.

The next day, Uncle Porson gives the Colonel's plan his full support. It is quickly revealed that Mary has been in love with Morris ever since she was young, and the union appears to be a perfect match. Morris proposes to Mary one night after a dinner party, and the two become engaged. At the dinner party beforehand, however, Mary hears tell of the new church rector's mysteriously beautiful daughter, Stella Fregelius. Immediately before agreeing to her marriage, Mary teases Morris by saying she hopes he does not end up being "taken possession of by some strange Stella coming out of nowhere". Uncle Porson soon runs into health problems and has a minor stroke. The doctors suggest that Uncle Porson should go to stay at his house in France to escape from England's cold and dreary climate, and the Monk and Porson duos leave immediately. Morris finds being away from his experiments in France to be a miserable experience, so Mary tells him to go home early and work on his aerophone until she and the others return for the wedding. Shortly after Morris returns to Monksland, a ship crashes into an infamously dangerous patch of rocks just outside town. The sailors from the ship bring Morris an unconscious man from the wreck, and as Morris treats him he soon finds out that the sailors deserted this man's daughter on the sinking ship. For reasons unknown even to Morris (perhaps the draw of Fate, as the book so frequently suggests), Morris sails out to the wreckage to save the girl. Somehow managing to find her and make the treacherous day-long journey back to land, Morris quickly learns that the incapacitated man in his house is the new rector, leaving the female to be none other than the fabled Stella Fregelius.

Morris takes in Mr. Fregelius and his daughter, allowing plenty of time for the reverend's slow recovery. While Mary and the others are away, Stella and Morris become very close. She is fascinated by the aerophone and spends hours helping Morris perfect it. Stella becomes the talk of the town when everyone hears her beautiful voice and remarkable looks in church one day. Mr. Layard, a rich little man from a town over, soon courts Stella to no avail. He and his jealous sister, Eliza, show nothing but contempt and jealousy toward her. Both bitter over the town's infatuation with her, the Layards set to work gossiping about Stella, telling everyone that she has become physically intimate with Morris, whose engagement to Mary is well known. Meanwhile, Uncle Porson falls ill in France and dies shortly after. To grieve, Mary spends an extra month there and the Colonel returns home without her. He soon catches wind of the Layards' gossip and, while he knows there is no truth to these rumours, he does think the two have become too close and advises them to keep apart from each other. Stella tells the Colonel in confidence that she loves Morris and plans to move to London so as to not disturb Morris and Mary's arrangements.

Upon hearing all of this from the Colonel, Morris realises that he is also deeply in love with Stella. However, he realises his obligations to his family, and he knows he cannot be with her. The night before she plans to leave, the two of them secretly meet in the old abandoned church where Morris did his experiments. The two openly confess their love for each other and promise each other their souls in the afterlife in what Stella calls a "spiritual marriage". While Morris promises to fulfill his obligations to Mary and his family while on earth, he promises that his soul shall join with hers in the afterlife. Once Morris leaves, Stella cries herself unconscious in the church and awakes in the midst of a horrible storm. The church is flooded and her death of drowning is imminent. With her last moments, she picks up the church's aerophone and calls Morris to inform him of her impending death, promising him that she did not plan this as an attempt at suicide. Ironically, Stella's death indirectly causes the massive success of the aerophone as it had just been perfected a few days before, and Morris had to prove to the newspapers that he had heard what had happened from Stella by demonstrating his invention. When Mary returns, Morris tells her about everything, including his spiritual marriage to Stella. As an understanding person, Mary says that she will forgive him and thanks the Lord that nothing irreversible had been done with Stella. The wedding goes as planned, and they have two children.

Despite his massive wealth and scientific success, Morris remains melancholy and depressed for years after Stella's death. When he reads Stella's old diary and finds a part where she claims to have summoned her deceased sister through fasting and intense concentration, Morris becomes obsessed with trying to do the same with Stella. At the same time, one of his children falls ill so Mary is too distracted to notice the rapid weight loss and mental deterioration of Morris. He begins to hallucinate and experience premonitions of Stella's appearance, but always falls short of actually summoning her. One night, Morris finally succeeds. Whether or not this is real or a hallucination resulting from his induced insanity it is not revealed. But when Stella's ghost refuses to talk to Morris, he becomes obsessed with trying to make her do so. After re-summoning her multiple times, Mary catches him in the act one evening and, out of resignation, tells him that she forgives him as long as he promises to stop, even though she knows he will not be able to. The book ends when Morris summons her one last time and dies as a result.

== Themes ==
=== Natural vs. Spiritual Law ===
While the main conflict in Stella Fregelius arises from a love triangle between Morris, Mary and Stella, the relationship between these three represents a larger conflict between different approaches to the understanding of life. On one hand sits Mary: an intelligent and witty female whose thoughts concern only what is known to the human world. She does not entertain lengthy considerations of an afterlife or worry herself with theories on human existence; she simply accepts her ignorance to the mysteries of life and does not speculate on matters that cannot be proven true or untrue. On the other hand, lies Stella: a beautiful young lady who is no stranger to death and looks forward to it much like the ancient Egyptians did. Morris and Stella frequently discuss the Ancient Egyptian view of which laws govern life and death, often referring the ancient peoples' superstitions and religious beliefs. Haggard often includes these ideas as he himself was interested "in the occult, in antiquity, in mysticism", and his novels frequently "sought answers to the meaning of life in the world's ancient myths". Stella understands life as a temporary state before passing on to another realm, the logistics of which shall remain unknown to man forever as humans lack the capacity to comprehend what they have not experienced (the afterlife). Where Stella accepts and embraces the uncertainty of life in a way that makes her drawn to philosophical thought, Mary avoids this uncertainty, regarding these spiritual questions and speculative thoughts as dangerous and unhealthy. Haggard directly addresses this theme in Stella Fregelius:

Their points of view were absolutely and radically different. The conflict was a conflict between the natural and the spiritual law; or, in other words, between hard, brutal facts and theories as impalpable as the perfume of a flower."

Between these two modes of thought is Morris. While he has a tendency for speculative thought, his ideas are more steeped in a scientific pursuit of knowledge that aims to turn theories into fact and thus synthesize a bridge between these two modes of thought. However, Stella quickly pulls Morris out of his middle ground and he eventually falls victim to his search to bring the spiritual world into the natural one. His ultimately downfall leaves readers with a sense of a necessary distinction between the natural and spiritual world. This book demonstrates a very big part of what Haggard believed, which was that while the two sets of laws apply to life in an equally satisfying way, to try and reconcile and combine the two only leads to madness and attempts to cross a line that this novel suggests should not be crossed. The aerophone itself is a representation of this conflict between natural and spiritual laws. While a frustrated Morris toils with his invention, he is never sure if the aerophone is governed by the natural laws of science, or if there is some spiritual connection that makes its wireless communication possible. The two forces work inextricably to allow the aerophone to function, and thus make Morris' invention a physical manifestation of one of the novel's main themes.

=== Fate/Destiny ===
Haggard's repeated use of foreshadowing and early revelation of some of the most significant events in the story raises many questions about the concept of fate, specifically whether or not humans have any control over it. From the beginning, Stella Fregelius has a melancholy and slightly foreboding overtone that, when paired with the closure of which the narrator speaks of the events, creates an eerie air of predestination. The title itself suggests a love-triangle whose tragic outcomes for all involved mirror those of a Shakespearean play. From the start, it would appear that Stella's arrival would bring some trouble to the land of Monksland. Mary light-heartedly uses Stella's name in a hypothetical scenario she describes, in which Morris is taken away from her by a love for a new woman. By repeatedly foreshadowing this scenario, Haggard makes it abundantly clear that this is exactly what will happen. Therefore, the readers observe Morris and Stella's interaction with a knowledge of their eventual downfalls, making each missed opportunity to avoid this that much more suggestive of the idea of an uncontrollable force of fate.

The characters speak frequently of fate. Morris, being an inquisitive and spiritual man, often stargazes and explores thoughts of life outside of the earthly realm. His distinction between the soul and the human body often lead to reflections on the transitory nature of human beings, and he begins to entertain the idea of life on earth as just a necessary step before passing to a new stage of life. This curiosity is piqued by Stella's arrival, as she holds a firm belief that this life is endured only as a way to reach the next life. Stella herself is a symbol of Fate. When Morris finds her, she is sitting on top of a sinking ship singing an Old Norse song that all of the women in her family sang in the hour of their death. Mr. Fregelius hears this and is greatly concerned because when anyone sang the "Greeting to Death" without dying immediately always died sometime in the near future. This immediately associates Stella with the force of fate, as her death seems inevitable from the moment she was rescued. Haggard frequently toys with the idea of fate in many of his novels, often questioning the importance of free will in an individual's lifelong pursuits. In this sense, Stella Fregelius is very much like a number of other Haggard novels.

=== The "Femme Fatale" ===
Many of Haggard's novels contain a female character who brings about the downfall of a male character in a way similar to that of the modern femme fatale. While the term "femme fatale" was not coined until well after Haggard's death, Stella plays this part perfectly in the novel. Lured in by her breathtaking looks, enchanting musical abilities and exceptional intelligence, Morris cannot resist becoming intimate with Stella even though he knows it will cause trouble (at the very least because he is an engaged man). Stella possesses all of the qualities needed to turn Morris into a successful and fully realised man, but any possibility of sustaining this improvement is doomed from the start since they can never be together. This love is what eventually destroys Morris. As with a femme fatale, readers are left to ask themselves whether or not the brief yet immeasurable success and happiness provided to him by Stella were worth his untimely death, or if he would have been better off living out a full life with Mary. The readers' awareness that Stella will eventually bring about Morris' downfall along with her lack of malice make her a great example of the romanticised femme fatale characters that frequently appeared in late 19th century British literature.

== Writing style and genre ==
As critics were quick to point out, Stella Fregelius does not follow Haggard's usual writing style or fall into his usual genre, adventure fiction. His writing style is emotionally charged, as with his other romances, yet has a reflectiveness and long-running ponderous undercurrent that makes the overall tone of the book much softer of and contemplative than many of his others. Due in part to his tone, and in part to the lofty nature of the subjects which his characters ponder over, Stella Fregelius is considered one of Haggard's most openly philosophical pieces in regards to spiritual and intellectual matters. While a small number of his more famous works, such as She, explore spiritual topics such as Buddhism and reincarnation, these are often smaller components of a larger narrative that serves as a more holistic commentary on social issues such as race and gender from an imperialistic point of view. As a domestically set novel, Stella loses the imperialist context in a way that gives Haggard more personal freedom in crafting intellectual characters and placing them in a familiar setting with a slower plot that are more conducive to prolonged reflections on deeper thought. He explores with great depth many of the topics that he only touches in his more prominent works . Modern literary critics have not paid enough attention to Stella Fregelius to nail it down into one specific subgenre, but it is widely labelled as being a part of the broader genre of domestic English romance, with roots in philosophical fiction and even a few elements of supernatural literature.

== Critical reception ==
While some of Haggard's novels have seen immeasurable success, others have been met with harsh criticism, and still others had some contemporary success but were outshined by his more famous works in the long run. Stella Fregelius falls into the third category, as many of the British newspapers praised Haggard's efforts, but the book failed to achieve the widespread success of his others. At the time, however, Stella Fregelius surprised critics, as it was a departure from Haggard's normal style. Haggard acknowledges this fact in his author's note, and even apologises to readers for "his boldness in offering to them a modest story which is in no sense a romance of the character that perhaps they expect from him". Many critics mentioned this preface in their reviews, noting how Haggard was accurate in saying that this story was different from his usual story but inaccurate in his assumption that he needed to apologise for it. For many, Stella Fregelius was a breath of fresh air, combining a love story with science and spiritual exploration in a narrative that fed readers' desire for thought rather than shallow plot. The lengthy story allowed Haggard to develop characters that a critic from The Athenaeum said, "reveals a subtler power of characterization that we have hitherto recognized in the author". On the other hand, some critics complained that it was too long, saying that "the later chapters need compression". Outside of the length of the novel's end, critics found few things to complain about regarding "Stella Fregelius". The general consensus among British periodicals was that "Stella Fregelius" was a refreshing departure from literary conventions that Haggard himself had helped establish. Many considered this book to be in the upper echelon of contemporary fiction, with the Saturday Review going so far as to say, "We call to mind nothing in fiction old or new that in the remotest degree resembles "Stella Fregelius"."

The book Science-Fiction: The Early Years said about Stella Fregelius that it was "one of Haggard's better works". It added that "Stella is well conceived within the bounds of romantic fiction, and Morris Monk's father, the slippery Colonel Monk. C.B. is beautifully characterized".

== Adaptation ==
The book was adapted into a 1921 British film, Stella.
