= Dugué =

Dugué is a surname. Notable people with the name include:

- Daniel Dugué (1912–1987), French mathematician
- Ferdinand Dugué (1816–1913), French poet and playwright
- Henri-Joseph Dugué de La Fauconnerie (1835–1914), French politician
- Perrine Dugué (1779–1796), French murder victim and revolutionary martyr
- Pierre Dugué de Boisbriand (1675–1736), French colonial governor of Louisiana
