= Tom Leamore =

British singer-songwriter

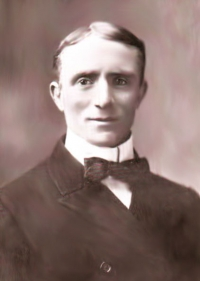
- Born: Henry Samuel Lee; 22 September 1866; Shoreditch, London, England
- Died: 6 September 1939 (aged 72); Lambeth, London, England
- Occupation(s): Comic, singer, dancer

Thomas Leamore (probably born Henry Samuel Lee; 22 September 1866 – 6 September 1939) was an English music hall and variety comic performer, dancer and singer.

== Life and career ==
He was born in Shoreditch, London, in 1866. There is some uncertainty over his birth name and details; an alternative date and birth name are given by the Music Hall Guild. He initially worked for a firm of wood carvers and gilders, but developed talents for clog and sand dancing. He first appeared on stage in the early 1880s, perhaps at the Rodney Music Hall as early as 1880, though his first paid appearance came in 1884. He quickly grew into a successful stage performer, singing comically and dancing eccentrically with clogs. Contemporary reviews state that he was second only to Dan Leno as an eccentric dancer.

Leamore appeared in pantomimes, though he claimed not to enjoy the experience, and he also fought as a boxer. He made up his own patter and songs, and, by 1898, he had introduced a repertoire of characters. He was engaged by the main London music halls as one of their leading attractions, sometimes performing in four different theatres each night. Lists of his engagements indicate that his popularity peaked in the 1890s and 1900s. He was the first music hall performer to make commercial recordings, for Berliner in 1898. His best known song was "Percy from Pimlico" which he composed and wrote himself in 1898. He recorded the song in the 1930s, and was featured singing it in the 1968 documentary A Little of What You Fancy. In December 1905 he portrayed Ali Baba in the pantomime of The Forty Thieves at the Marlborough Theatre. He continued to perform in the 1910s, but his career began to fade. He toured South Africa in 1921, and Australia and New Zealand the following year, but by that time was seen as "quaint" and "old school".

In the early 1930s, he made some radio and experimental television broadcasts, as a "veteran" performer. In November 1937 Leamore joined the Old Timers touring company with fellow artistes including Tom Costello, George Mozart, and Tom Finglass, appearing with them in various venues across the UK. The following he took part in an early television programme, Cavalcade of Music Hall, broadcast from the Alexandra Palace. At the end of the same month he also appeared in the television broadcast New Years Eve Party with Sam Mayo and Daisy Dormer. In 1938 he continued to tour with The Old Timers, and appeared in the touring revue Time Marches On. In November 1938 he took part in a Royal Command Performance during which he performed "The Lambeth Walk" with Lupino Lane and various other music hall veterans. In 1939 he took part in Flashbacks of 30 Years Ago with Wilkie Bard, Ida Barr and Lillie Lassah.

Leamore married three times. In 1889 he married Florrie Palmer, who died in 1895. He then married actress and dancer Rose Hamilton. They divorced in 1907, by which time he had been living for several years with Mary Ann Fleming, whom he married the same year.

He died in Lambeth Hospital in 1939, aged 72, and was buried in the Variety Plot at Streatham Park Cemetery.
