= Tivoli Theatre of Varieties =

Coordinates: 51.5097°N 0.1228°W

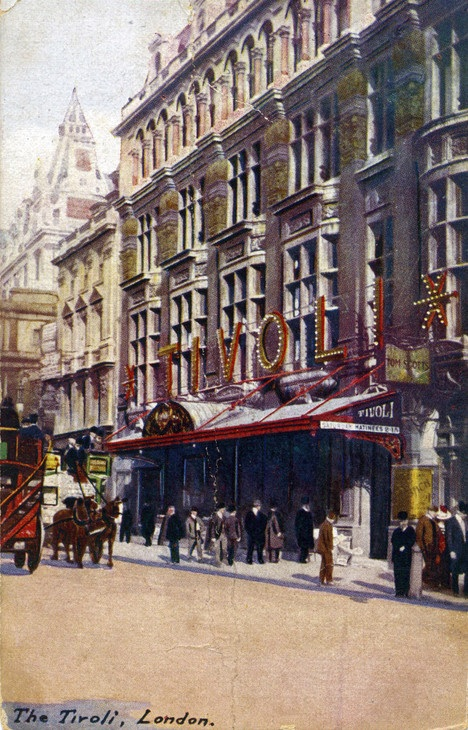
The first Tivoli Theatre, when it was a music hall

The Tivoli Theatre of Varieties was a popular English theatre based in the Strand, West London. It was designed by Charles Phipps and was built during 1889–90 at a cost of £300,000. It was constructed on the former site of the Tivoli Beer Garden and Restaurant. In the consortium that financed the project was the actor Edward O'Connor Terry. The hall opened on 24 May 1890 and was located opposite the Adelphi Theatre.

After a few years, the hall was bought by the impresario Charles Morton, under whose proprietorship, it became one of London's leading music halls. Morton employed, among others: George Robey, Harriet Vernon, Nellie Navette, Harry Randall, Herbert Campbell, Vesta Victoria, the Brothers Griffiths, Ada Blanche, Leo Stormont, Little Tich, Dan Leno and Eugene Stratton. In 1900, the theatre was refurbished and the seating capacity was reduced. On 7 February 1914 the theatre closed for a road widening scheme, but due to the outbreak of World War I this didn't happen immediately, so the theatre stood derelict until it was demolished in 1916.

== The cinema period ==
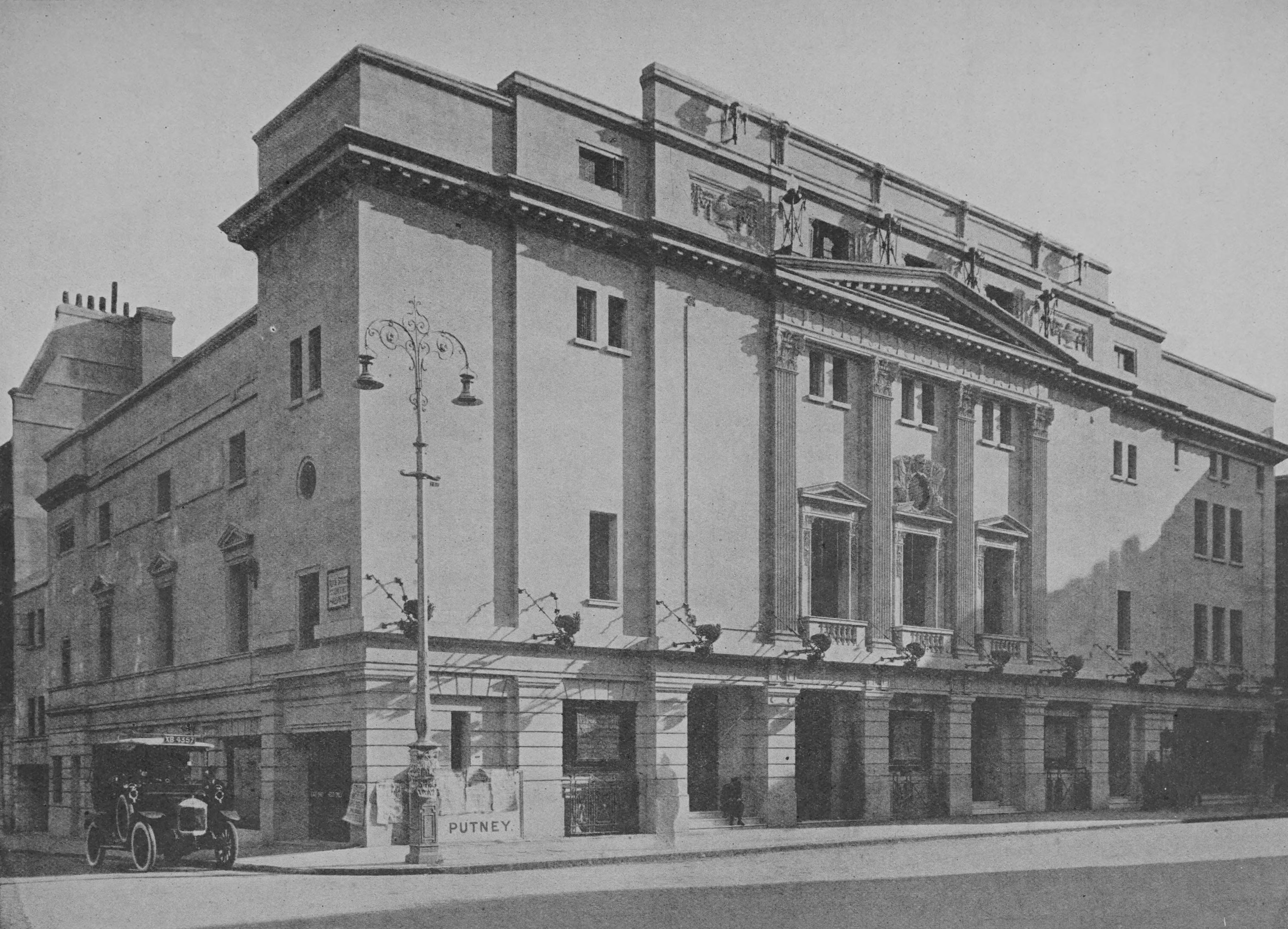
The 1923 theatre, designed by Bertie Crewe with Gunton & Gunton

Several years after the end of World War I, when the Strand had been widened to its present size, it was decided to build a cinema on the site. Theatre architect Bertie Crewe and the architectural firm Gunton & Gunton designed the new Tivoli Picture Theatre, an imposing building in white Portland stone. Inside the auditorium, there were 2,115 seats: 906 seats in the stalls, 637 in the circle and 572 in the balcony. Marketed as the Tivoli Theatre or simply The Tivoli, it opened on 7 September 1923 with the showing of the film Where the Pavement Ends. This was the result of a deal with American Loew's Incorporated, that the Tivoli would present exclusive runs of their films (from Metro Pictures and MGM) concurrent with their American release.

In 1925, the cinema was taken over by MGM/Loew's and was their showcase theatre in London for a few years, until they opened their new Empire Theatre in Leicester Square in November 1928. Tivoli was then sold to Provincial Cinematograph Cinemas (PCT), which soon became part of Gaumont British.

During its most popular period, the Tivoli was the big premier cinema in London, showing the very first sound short films in 1925, as well as the epic Ben Hur starring Ramon Novarro, which showed twice daily to a total of 1.2 million spectators. It also premiered Samuel Goldwyn's first "talkie", Bulldog Drummond starring Ronald Colman, which was a huge hit in August 1929. However, as newer cinemas opened around Leicester Square, Tivoli lost its premier status, and in 1938 it became a second-run weekly change house.

The cinema remained in business for over 30 years but eventually closed in 1957 and was demolished and replaced by a department store, which was later converted into New South Wales House for the Australian Government. In the late 1990s, New South Wales House was demolished and replaced by an office block.
