= Nellie Navette =

British music hall serio-comic performer

Nellie Navette in 1909

Nellie Navette (1865–3 August 1936) was a well-known British music hall serio-comic performer of the late Victorian era. Famous as a pantomime Principal boy, comedienne, dancer and singer, she made frequent appearances at such venues as the East End Pavilion Theatre and the Tivoli Theatre of Varieties on The Strand where she appeared alongside such entertainers as Lottie Collins, George Robey, Tom Costello and Marie Lloyd, among others.

In 1889 she appeared in the pantomime Little Jack and the Big Beanstalk at the Prince of Wales Theatre in Liverpool. In 1893 she introduced her new ‘Floral Electric Dance’ which she first performed at the Alhambra Theatre in Leicester Square in London with "kaleidoscopic effects" by Mr. A.L. Fyfe and specially written music by Georges Jacobi,

In April 1893 she appeared at the opening night performance of the West London Theatre of Varieties in London, while in 1895 she introduced the song and accompanying dance The Coon's Serenade. In 1900 she was on the bill at the Tivoli Theatre in Birmingham.

Nellie Navette died in August 1936 aged 71 and is buried in Streatham Park Cemetery in London.

== See also ==
- List of dancers
