= List of people from Marylebone =

This is a list of notable residents of Marylebone. Sherlock Holmes of 221B Baker Street is perhaps the best-known fictional resident. Actual residents, past and present, include:

- Adam Ant
- Jane Asher
- Alfred Jules Ayer
- David Cameron
- Tom Sandars
- Benedict Arnold
- Charles Babbage
- Francis Beaufort
- Jane Birkin
- Isabella Blow
- Bertie Carvel
- Richard Tappin Claridge
- William Coldstream
- Wilkie Collins
- Nipper Pat Daly
- Charles Dickens
- Jacqueline du Pré
- T. S. Eliot
- Clement Freud
- Gary Glitter
- Edward Gibbon
- Hughie Green
- Richard Hammond
- Jimi Hendrix
- Alexander Hewat
- Belinda Lang
- Edward Lear
- John Lennon
- Christian Jessen
- Henry Knight
- Madonna
- Jonathan Myles-Lea
- Paul McCartney
- Hayley Mills
- Ivor Moreton
- Henry Neele
- Annie Newton
- Harry Paulo
- Belville Robert Pepper
- Pitt the Elder
- Elizabeth Press (1920–2008), immunologist
- Stuart Price
- Patrick Procktor
- Corin Redgrave
- George Reynolds
- Wendy Richard
- Talulah Riley
- Isabella Frances Romer
- Dodie Smith
- Stephen Spender
- Ringo Starr
- Cat Stevens
- Stephen Ward
- H. G. Wells
- Charles Wesley
- Norman Wisdom

== See also ==
- List of people from London
