= Grand Theatre, Islington =

Former theatre in London, England

- Philharmonic, Islington (1860–1882); Empire, Islington (1908–1962)
- Address: 40 Islington High Street; London

Construction
- Years active: 1860–1962
- Architects: Frank Matcham (1883, 1888 and 1901)

The Grand Theatre, Islington – formerly the Philharmonic, Islington, later the Empire, Islington, and finally the Empire Cinema – was a theatre and later a cinema in the London suburb of Islington. Opened in 1860 as a concert hall it became a theatre in the 1870s. After it was destroyed by fire in 1882 a replacement was designed by Frank Matcham; it opened in 1883, was burnt down in 1888, rebuilt to Matcham's designs, and burnt down again in 1900. Matcham again designed a replacement, which survived a 1933 fire and stood until the building was demolished in 1962.

The theatre was home to French opéra comique in the 1870s, melodrama in the 1880s and a range of productions in the 1890s. It became a regular first stop for companies from the West End going on provincial tours, and many stars appeared there including Henry Irving, George Alexander, Arthur Bourchier, Lottie Collins, Tom Costello, Harry Randall and Lewis Waller. In the 20th century the building became first a music hall and then, for its last thirty years, a cinema.

== History ==
The site of the Grand Theatre, Islington, was on the east side of Islington High Street, at No. 40. It was the location for four successive places of entertainment, under different names, from 1860 to 1962.

=== First theatre: The Philharmonic, 1860 ===
The Philharmonic in 1862

The theatre opened in 1860 as the Philharmonic Hall, designed by Finch, Hill & Paraire, with a capacity of 1,500. The site had been a notorious slum in the early 19th century, described by The Era as "miserably dilapidated and filthy tenements, inhabited by the very lowest and most dangerous classes". It was later occupied by a furniture dealer until his premises burned down in 1848. The site remained unoccupied until the Philharmonic Hall was built.

The proprietors of the new hall, Frederick Sanders and Edward Lacey, were granted a music licence on 15 October 1860, and the hall opened on 10 November. It was advertised as "by far the most Elegant Music Hall in the Metropolis, with its Italian Corridor and Richly Decorated Pompeian Courts for Billiards and American Bowls". Initially the hall staged upmarket musical entertainments, including potted versions of operas such as Norma, I Puritani and other works by Bellini, but its standards declined. Ten years after its inauguration it was, in the words of one theatre historian, "a rather grubby Hall ... often referred to by its habitués as 'The Spittoon' from its lack of the virtue which ranks next to godliness". In 1870 a new proprietor, Charles Head, appointed Charles Morton as its manager to restore the original standards of the house. Its title was changed to the "Philharmonic Theatre of Varieties".

Under Morton, alterations included a new stage and promenade and the seating was reduced to 758. From 1871 Morton engaged Emily Soldene as his leading lady, and instituted a programme of light French operas, some with can-can girls, attracting a fashionable male audience. His first big success was Offenbach's Geneviève de Brabant, with Soldene as Drogan, the pastrycook, and Selina Dolaro in the title role. The success of the show was assured when the Prince of Wales booked a box to see it; the production had a highly profitable run of more than a year and a half. The author of the English libretto, H. B. Farnie, took rooms nearby during the run but, as the historian Charles Harris puts it, "he found himself busy in West End light musicals" because the success of Offenbach in Islington stimulated the production of British shows in central London. The Philharmonic remained focused on French imports. Light operas by Offenbach, Delibes and Lecocq followed, though without the enormous success of Geneviève de Brabant. Soldene was in the company for the earlier productions, but eventually left to play in America and Australia. Fashionable audiences from the grander areas of the capital tailed off and the clientele of the theatre was largely local later in the 1870s and early 1880s. Richard D'Oyly Carte directed a revival of Geneviève de Brabant in 1878 with Alice May as Drogan and Alice Burville in the title role. The young Henry Lytton, later to be closely associated with Carte, made his first appearance on the stage at the Philharmonic in March 1881.

The Philharmonic was destroyed by fire on 6 September 1882.

=== Second and third theatres: The Grand, 1883 and 1888 ===
Ground-floor plan of Frank Matcham's 1883 design for the site

The next building on the site was short-lived, lasting for four years from its opening in 1883. Frank Matcham designed the new theatre, renamed The Grand. In his Modern Opera Houses and Theatres (1896) Edwin Sachs commended the "good sighting and acoustics of the auditorium, economy of space and cost, and rapidity of execution", but added that the building was "not exactly distinguished for worthy conception, or even careful architectural rendering". Matcham's improvements of sightlines were a result of his use of cantilevered steel. His new design allowed the balcony to protrude into the auditorium without the use of supporting pillars which increased seating capacity and gave the audience better views of the stage. The capacity of the auditorium was further enlarged by abandoning the billiard rooms and bowling saloons of the old Philharmonic, and devoting the whole site to the theatre.

The Era commented after a preview of the theatre:

The house is entered, as before, from the High-street; but in place of the old, narrow, and inconvenient approaches, we find wide and handsome vestibules and corridors, and we note especially the crush-room and grand staircase forming the approach to the stalls, boxes, and first circle, with their convenient retiring-rooms and spacious refreshment saloons in immediate connection. ... The auditorium (which, it is said, will accommodate 3,000 persons) covers an area of about 70 ft. by 68 ft., (Note: 21.3 by 20.7 metres) and (independently of private boxes, of which there are six) comprises stalls, pit stalls, and a most ample pit on the ground floor or street level; a first tier consisting of dress circle and balcony, with a promenade in the rear; and a second tier, consisting of amphitheatre and a spacious gallery.

The paper concluded, "We may congratulate Messrs Holt and Wilmot upon having one of the finest theatres in the country". The partners in management were Clarence Holt, described by Harris as "a bad actor with a reputation as the most foul-mouthed member of his profession" and Charles Wilmot, an experienced manager from Australia.

Among the productions at the new house were spectacular melodramas, staged by Wilmot. In May 1886 the first performance in Britain of Shelley's verse drama The Cenci was given at the Grand. The Lord Chamberlain refused to license the work for public performance because of its themes of incest and parricide, and admittance to the performance was therefore by invitation only. Among the packed house were Robert Browning, George Meredith, Sir Percy and Lady Shelley, Andrew Lang and Bernard Shaw. Alma Murray played Beatrice Cenci, Hermann Vezin the Count and Ben Greet Savella. In 1887 Seymour Hicks made his stage début at the Grand, "walking on" (i.e. being a non-speaking supernumerary) in In the Ranks by G. R. Sims and Harry Pettitt. It was the practice of West End producers to send their productions, often with the original casts, on tour in the provinces after their West End runs. The Grand, Islington was frequently the first stop on a tour; consequently audiences there were able to see stars such as Henry Irving, Nellie Farren and Fred Leslie. The Royal Opera touring company also played at the Grand.

The theatre burned down in December 1887, and for its replacement Wilmot again commissioned Matcham. Both agreed that there was no reason to depart from the architect's original 1883 designs and the theatre was rebuilt accordingly. Among those appearing at the Grand towards the end of the 19th Century were Lewis Waller's and George Alexander's companies in straight dramas, and in pantomimes, Harry Randall, Tom Costello and Lottie Collins. Arthur Bourchier played Romeo at the Grand in 1890, and Lena Ashwell made her stage début there.

The second Matcham theatre was destroyed by fire in February 1900.

=== Fourth theatre: The Grand (1901) and the Empire (1908) ===
Grand Theatre in 1903, during a production of J. B. Buckstone's melodrama Green Bushes

Matcham was once again called in to design a replacement for the burned theatre. His 1901 design was not radically different from that of 1883 and 1888. Four new staircases and exits were built in different parts of the auditorium and entirely new exits from the dressing-rooms and stage were added. The auditorium was reconstructed mainly on the old plan, with the exception that the upper part of the private boxes was removed to allow the expansion of the gallery, giving extra seating accommodation. The seating on the ground floor was rearranged and laid out in curves so that all occupants directly faced the stage. There were five rows of orchestra stalls, seven rows of pit stalls and twelve rows of pit seats. The stage remained as before and the large scene dock and scenery store, and painting-rooms, at the side of the stage, which were completely burnt out, were re-erected in concrete and iron. The whole building was now lit by electricity.

In 1907 Walter Gibbons took over the theatre. At first he continued the policy of staging legitimate drama, but, finding it unsuccessful, he applied to the local authority for a music and dancing licence. There was vociferous opposition to this from theatrical trade unions on the grounds that Gibbons already controlled numerous music halls and was seeking to establish a monopoly, but he was granted the licence in November 1907. He instituted a regular programme of twice-nightly variety. His background was in cinematography, and in 1908 he had Matcham design a projection box at the back of the gallery. Gibbons had begun his theatre-owning career with the Islington Empire, on the west side of the nearby Upper Street, next to the Royal Agricultural Hall. In March 1908 he renamed that first theatre as the Islington Palace and transferred the former name so that the Grand now became the Islington Empire.

Gibbons succeeded in building if not a monopoly then a substantial empire of music halls. After he formed an alliance with Oswald Stoll, their company, the London Theatres of Varieties, controlled twenty-two theatres. In 1912 Gibbons retired and his former secretary, Charles Gulliver, was appointed managing director of the company. The theatre continued to present regular variety until 1932. Topping the bill in the final week of variety were Florrie Forde and Jimmy James.

Thereafter the theatre continued mainly as a cinema, with some occasional variety acts. There was a fourth fire in 1933 and the house was closed for four months for repair. Its name was changed again to Empire Cinema to reflect the new arrangements, and in 1960 the centenary of the original theatre was celebrated with a dinner at the nearby Peacock Tavern. In 1962 the building closed and the auditorium was demolished shortly afterwards; the façade remained and became the entrance to a car-park on the site of the theatre. In 1981 the remnants of the building were demolished to make way for a bank.

== Notes, references and sources ==
=== Sources ===
- Jones, Brian (2005). Lytton, Gilbert and Sullivan's Jester. London: Trafford. ISBN 978-1-4120-5482-9.
- Harris, Charles (1976). Islington. London: Hamish Hamilton. ISBN 978-0-24-102485-0.
- Manley, Bill (1990). Islington Entertained. London: Islington Libraries. ISBN 978-0-90-226025-2.
- Parker, John, ed. (1925). Who's Who in the Theatre (fifth ed.). London: Sir Isaac Pitman and Sons. OCLC 10013159.
- Sachs, Edwin (1896). Modern Opera Houses and Theatres, Volume 1. London: Batsford. OCLC 1114112.
- Sherson, Erroll (1925). London's Lost Theatres of the Nineteenth Century. London: John Lane. OCLC 1866816.
- Willats, Eric (1987). Streets With a Story: The Book of Islington. London: Islington Local History Education Trust. ISBN 0-95-118710-4.
