= Amy Sedgwick =

British actress (1835–1897)

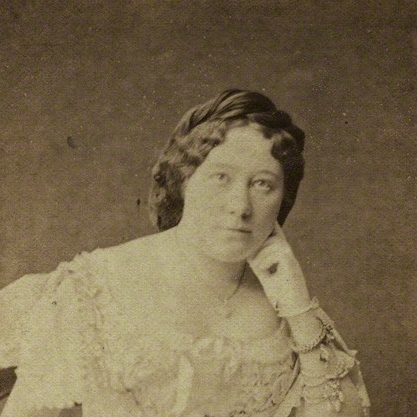
- Sedgwick c. 1860
- Born: 27 October 1835; Bristol
- Died: 7 November 1897 (aged 62); Hayward's Heath

Amy Sedgwick or Sarah Gardiner (27 October 1835 – 7 November 1897) was a British actress.

== Life ==
Sedgwick's name at birth was Sarah Gardiner. She was born in Bristol on 27 October 1835. Her early appearances were in Bristol and the provinces before she was booked for three years in Manchester. On 5 October 1857 she took the part of Pauline in Edward Bulwer-Lytton's Lady of Lyons at the Haymarket Theatre in London.

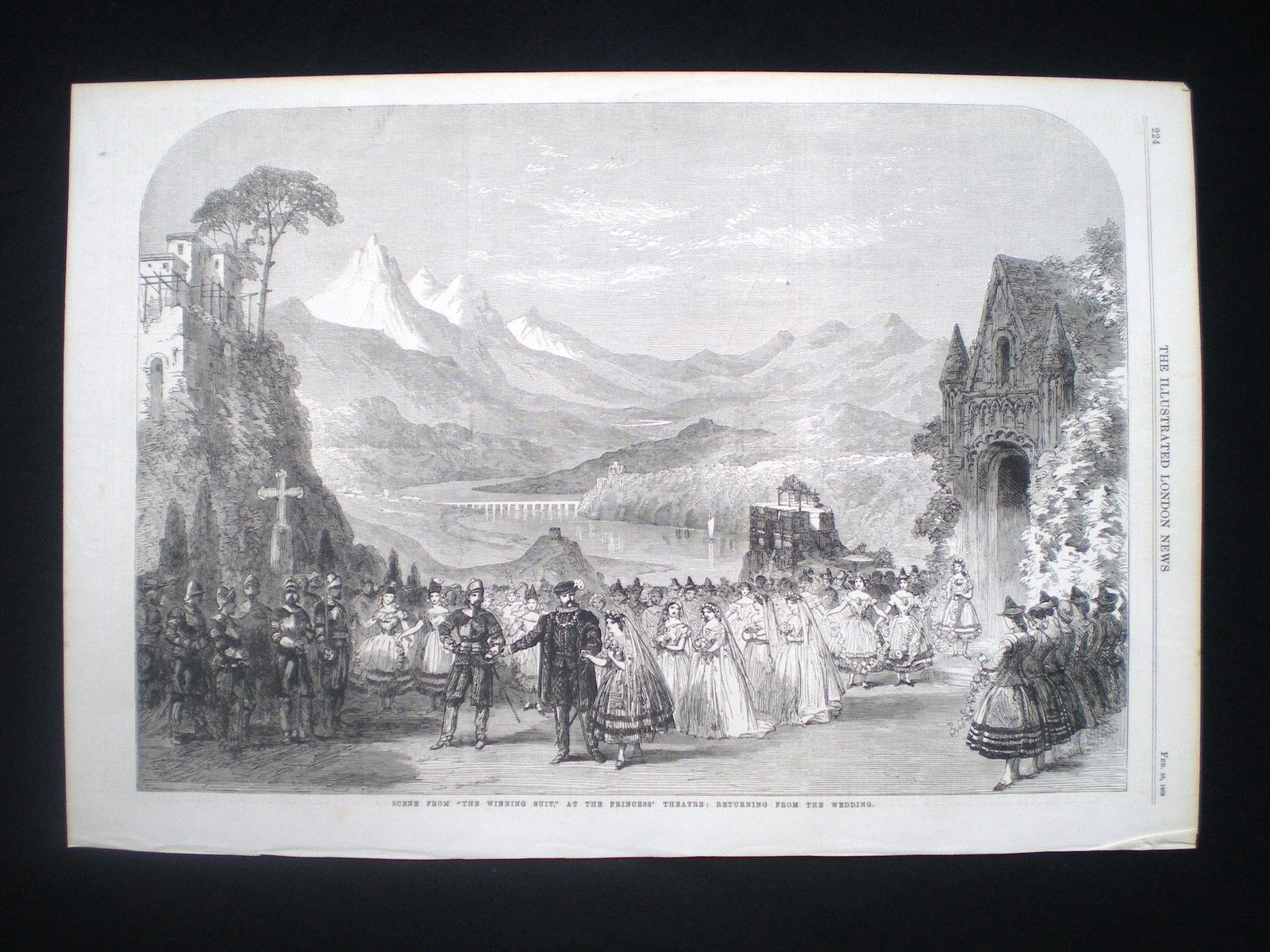
The Winning Suit Sedgwick from the Illustrated London News

Sedgwick's further roles at the Haymarket included Constance in The Love Chase by Sheridan Knowles, Hester Grazebrook in The Unequal Match by Tom Taylor, Beatrice in Shakespeare's Much Ado About Nothing, Julia in The Hunchback, Lady Teazle in The School for Scandal, and Juliana in The Honeymoon. At the Olympic Theatre, beginning in 1861, she played Lady Teazle again, and went on to several further roles there.

In 1863 she appeared at the Princess's Theatre as the first Orelia in Lewis Filmore's Winning Suit. In 1869 she was allowed to direct herself in the play Pindee Singh, the Pearl of Oude by C. H. Stephenson, which was the opening performance of the Royal Albert Theatre. Unfortunately the play was not a success.

In 1871 Sedgwick was commended for her performance at the Exeter Hall where she entertained an audience in a charity performance for the French. Her comic interpretation of the Dickens character "Sergeant Buzfuz" was a favorite performance in this part of her career.

French writer Henri-François-Alphonse Esquiros described Amy Sedgwick's appearance in 1862 as "not a Greek beauty, but a true English beauty, tall and well filled out, with an intelligent mouth and forehead, blue eyes, hair of golden auburn, firmly and yet delicately pencilled eyebrows, teeth of irreproachable whiteness, and a peculiar art of conquest."

She was known as Mrs. Parkes after her marriage to W. B. Parkes in 1858, and in her widowhood after 1863. Sedgwick died in Hayward's Heath in 1897, aged 63 years.
