= Clapham Grand =

Multi-purpose building in London, England

Coordinates: 51.4631°N 0.1694°W

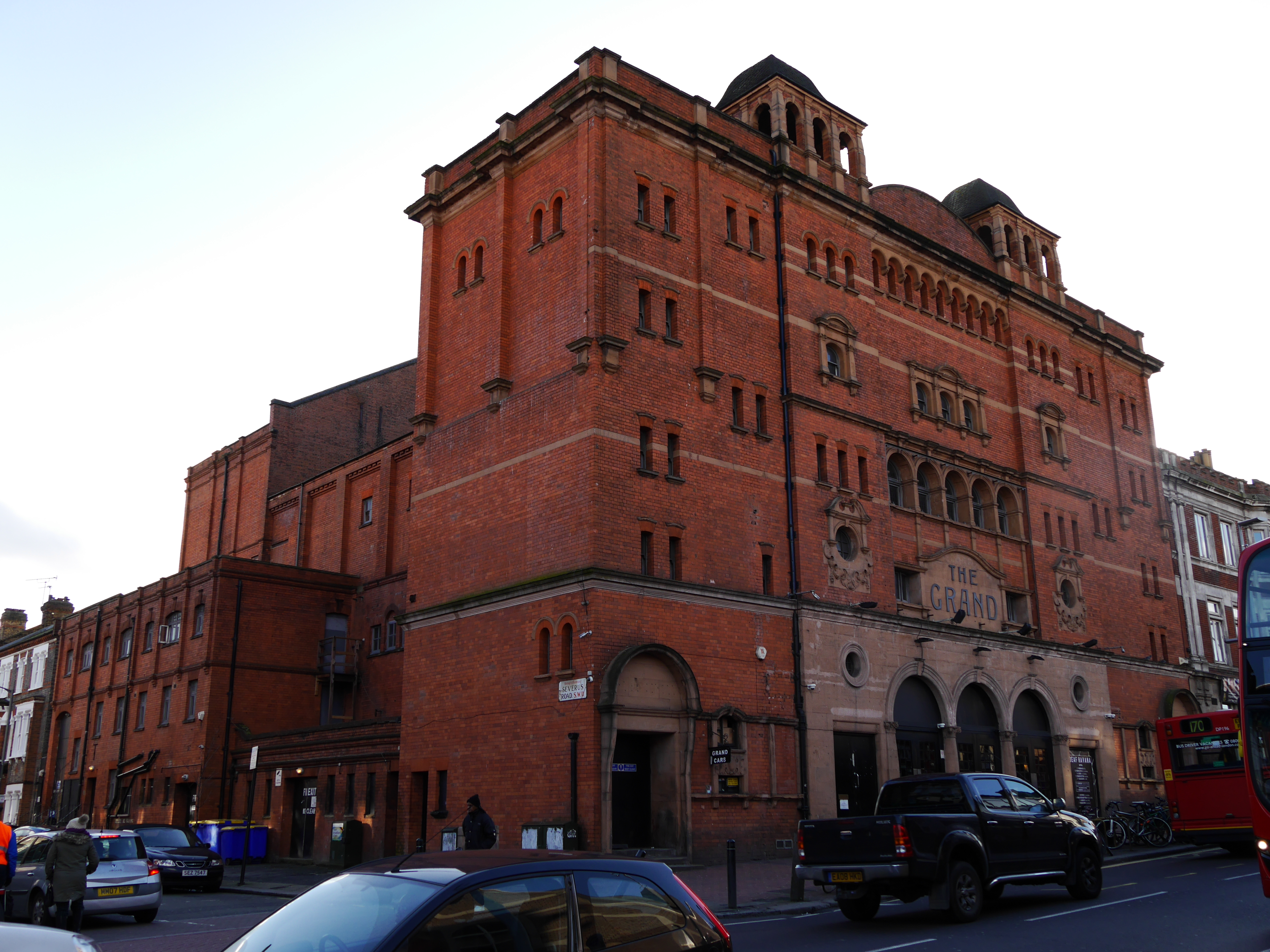
The Grand in 2014

The Grand (previously The Grand Theatre) is a Grade II listed building on St John's Hill, near Clapham Junction in Battersea, South London. It was designed by Ernest Woodrow and was first opened in 1900 as The New Grand Theatre of Varieties.

The theatre was built for a consortium which was led by the well-known music hall artistes Dan Leno, Herbert Campbell, Harry Randall, and Fred Williams. Today, it is a nightclub, live music venue, theatre and event space.

== History ==
The venue opened on Monday 26 November 1900 as "The New Grand Theatre of Varieties", with a music hall production featuring many well-known artistes of the time. When the theatre opened it had a capacity of 3,000 and a stage 68 by 28 feet (20.7 by 8.5 m).

The Grand continued to be a successful music hall and variety venue for 40 years. In 1927, the theatre was fitted for cinema use though was known as The Grand Theatre, as it still mainly staged variety shows. From 8 May 1950, The Grand went on to become a full-time cinema after it was purchased by the Essoldo Cinema chain and was renamed Essoldo Cinema. The Essoldo Cinema closed on 31 August 1963 and became the Essoldo Bingo Club on 11 October 1963 which was later taken over by Classic Cinemas who renamed it Vogue Bingo Club. During this time, they built a false ceiling, cutting off the upper parts of the theatre. From 1972 until 1979, Mecca Bingo took over as the final bingo operator.

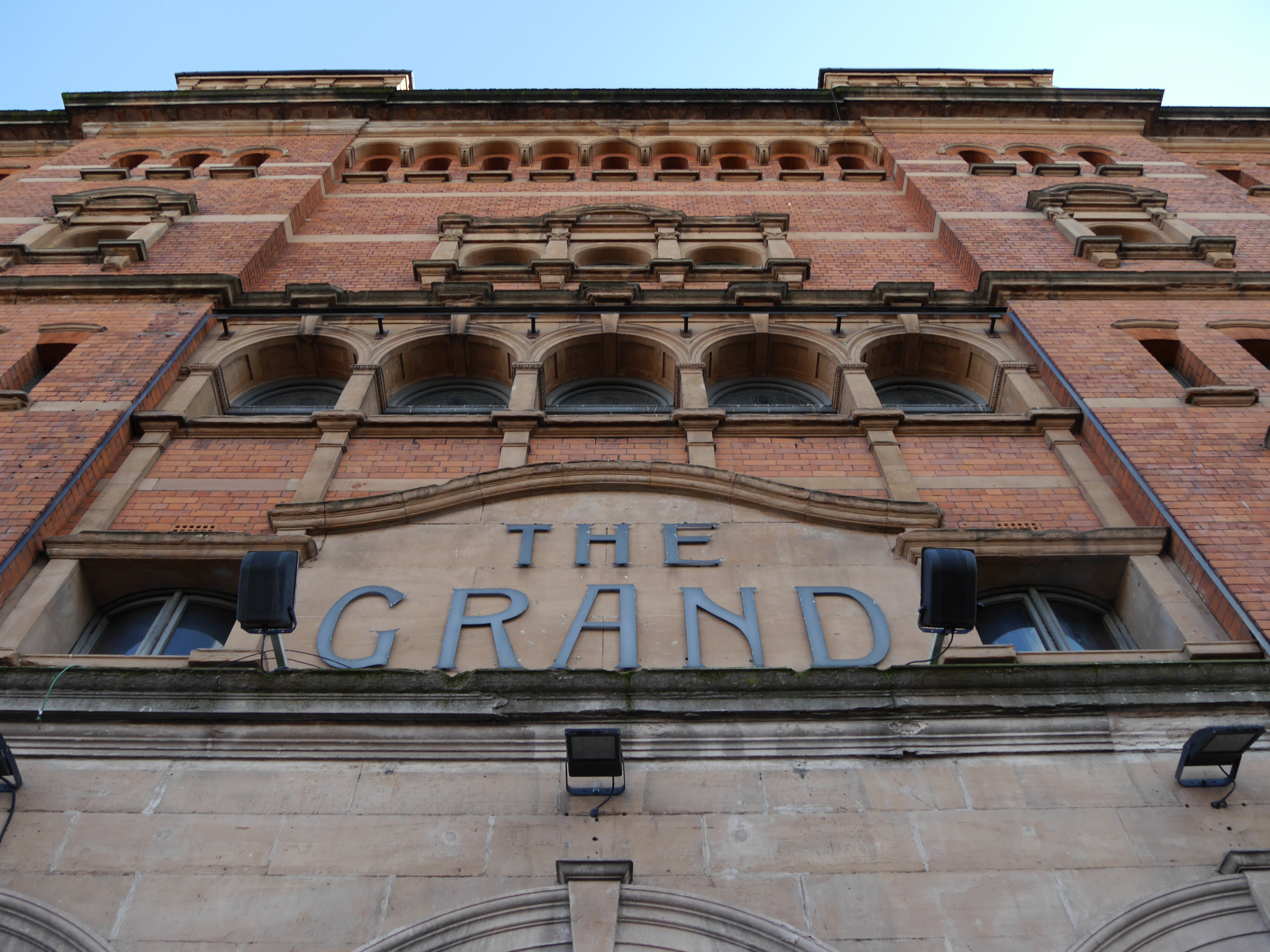
Building entrance

The building remained closed until 1989 when it was bought by The Mean Fiddler group to be transformed into a live music venue. Due to licensing issues the venue did not open until 17 December 1991. During the 10-year closure, the false ceiling was removed and the building was restored and redecorated. Mean Fiddler closed on 20 July 1997 after being mostly unsuccessful as a music venue and was then purchased by pub chain J.D.Wetherspoon. J.D.Wetherspoon was refused a licence after a public enquiry but refused to sell the property when actors Corin Redgrave and Vanessa Redgrave put forward plans to restore the building back to its original use.

The Grand is now an independently run venue which functions as a nightclub, live music venue, theatre and event space. Some of the acts to have performed at The Grand include; The Kinks, Chuck Berry, The Temptations, Zaïko Langa Langa, Siouxsie and the Banshees, Echo and the Bunnymen, Madness, Public Enemy, Jamiroquai, Peter Hammill, Chipmunk, Paul Weller, Oasis, Muse, Hole, The Verve and Jamie Cullum, The Jam and Brian May.

It was also used as the studio location for the first series of the television show Taskmaster, with subsequent series using a studio set replicating the venue's interior.

It is owned by Howard Spooner.
