= Norman Clapham =

British comedian with stage name of John Henry

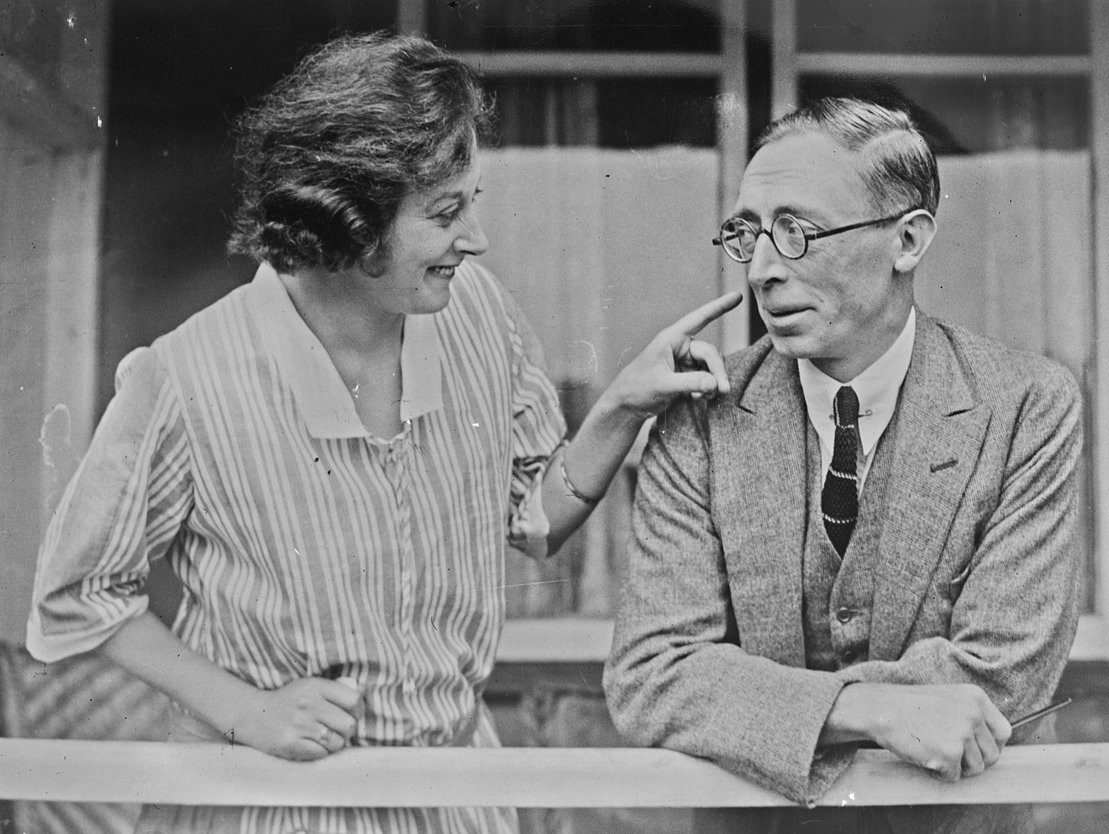
- "John Henry" (Norman Clapham) and "Blossom" (Gladys Horridge)
- Born: 3 September 1879; Wakefield, West Riding of Yorkshire, England
- Died: 14 May 1934 (aged 54); Kensington, London, England
- Other name: John Henry
- Occupation: Comedian

Norman Clapham (3 September 1879 – 14 May 1934) was a British comedian, who performed under the stage name John Henry. He was known for his pioneering work in radio comedy, and his early commercial recordings in the genre. He killed himself after the death of his romantic and stage partner Gladys Horridge coincided with the imminent exposure of his deceptions about their marital status.

== Career ==
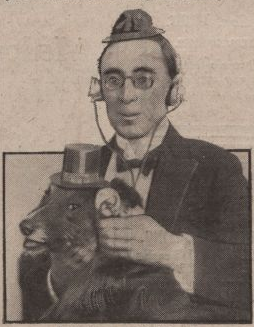
Clapham as John Henry, with 'Erbert, from the 21 December 1923 edition of The Radio Times

Clapham was born in Wakefield, West Riding of Yorkshire, in 1879, and emigrated to Canada where he was employed as a journalist. During World War I he worked as a comedian, entertaining Canadian troops.

He subsequently found work as a clerk with the British civil service, working at the Board of Trade. He was engaged to entertain a smoking concert arranged by his employer, and was "discovered" there by the BBC. It is known that his BBC debut was on 31 May 1923.

He performed in the guise of John Henry, a "lugubrious Yorkshireman". Denis Gifford described John Henry as "the first comedian to become a national personality through radio". In 1925, he introduced his wife, Blossom, into the comedy show An Hour in a Restaurant. Henry was hen-pecked by his wife, a role latterly played by Gladys Horridge. According to Gifford, "the team of John Henry and Blossom... can be considered the start of domestic comedy in radio." Other characters referred to in his monologues and sketches were Henry's dog 'Erbert (an "almost collie") and Henry's friends Joe and Emma Murgatroyd.

Between 1925 and 1932, a number of commercial gramophone recordings of his sketches were released on the His Master's Voice label. Some of these also featured Horridge. Clapham and Horridge toured Australia and New Zealand.

Henry also appeared as the subject of a comic strip in the Daily Sketch, and Clapham wrote in character for The Radio Times and Tit-Bits.

== Personal life ==
Clapham married, and had at least one child, a son. He and his wife separated in or around 1914, but did not divorce.

After another failed relationship, he became romantically involved with Gladys Horridge, and they lived together as man and wife, in a flat in Holland Road, Kensington, London

== Horridge's death ==
Horridge died in April 1934, due to acute peritonitis. Clapham gave evidence at her inquest, falsely testifying that they were married. His manager, Sydney Brandon, said that Clapham subsequently drank heavily, and had said that he would not "get over" her loss.

He also mentioned killing himself to Hazel Wilford (also known as Mrs. Hudson), an actress with whom he had begun to work. They had made their debut as "John Henry and the New Blossom" in late April. The pair were also planning film work, and a West End show. He left a sealed envelope with her, to be opened "when I'm not here".

== Clapham's death ==
On 14 May, Clapham's upstairs neighbour at Holland Road noticed the smell of gas coming from Clapham's flat, and entered to find his body leaning against his gas stove, with a suicide note and letters lying adjacent. He was holding a photograph of Horridge.

In one of the letters he left with Hazel Wilford, he had written:

"My dear Gladys, before she died, asked me to bury her in my name. We could not legally be married, but by everything else we were. I loved her, and swore that she was my wife in order to protect her memory. So I shall join my darling. I leave nothing but my good name to the thousands who have not seen me, and my useless body to the hospital where they were good to my girl."

An inquest, held by the coroner for Paddington, Ingleby Oddie on 16 May, gave a verdict of death from coal gas poisoning, and that Clapham "killed himself while of unsound mind". During the inquest, it emerged that Clapham had feared that the exposure of and prosecution for his pretence of being married to Horridge would harm his career, and that he was being pursued by his estranged wife for alimony.

Around 500 mourners attended his funeral, at Streatham Park Cemetery, which was paid for by the Variety Artistes' Benevolent Fund.

== Legacy ==
Seán Street, Professor of Radio at Bournemouth University, described Clapham as the "forerunner of a number of great radio comedians, among them Tommy Handley, Gillie Potter, Arthur Askey, Frankie Howerd and Tony Hancock".

Jennifer Purcell of Saint Michael's College called him "the first artist to write and perform radiogenic material." She noted his experimental use of sound effects, and called his style as "warm and conversational, with a sense of casual armchair intimacy, well-suited to the domestic space of radio listening". However, she also critiqued how he "delineated the collective identity of his audience with remarks aimed at married men and fathers", giving as an example his comparison of wives to loudspeakers.
