= The Sea of Ice (play) =

The Sea of Ice is a 19th century melodrama play in English adapted from the 1853 French play La Priére des Naufragés (Prayer of the Wrecked) by Adolphe d'Ennery and Ferdinand Dugué.

== French debut ==
The French play under the title La Priére des Naufragés was first performed at the Théâtre de l'Ambigu-Comique and debuted on 20 October 1853.

=== Original Paris cast ===
- Carlss by Charles de Chilly
- Barabas by Laurent
- Raoul de Lascours by Delafosse
- Georges De Laval by M. Coste
- Horace de Brionne by C. Lemaitre
- Medoc by Machanette
- Un Secretaire d'Ambassade by Depresle
- Un Intendant by Martin
- Premier Matelot by Richer
- Deuxieme Metelot by Lavergne
- Louise de Descours by Marie Laurent
- Ogarita by Idem
- La Comtesse de Theringe by Mesanges
- Diane by Snadre
- Marthe, age 6 by De Brueil

== English adaptations ==
In London, it debuted at the Adelphi Theatre under the title The Thirst for Gold, or the Lost Ship and the Wild Flower of Mexico on 4 December 1853, with Benjamin Nottingham Webster as Carlos. It ran to great success until June 1854, and had a running length of three and a half hours. The big draw was a scene where the mutineers of a ship strand the captain and his family on a sea of ice which then breaks up. However, because Webster had simply pirated the play from the French version, once this was exposed a number of copycat translations popped up. One adaptation appeared at the Marylebone Theatre in London in 1854 under the title The Struggle for Gold: or, the Orphan of the Frozen Sea, which added a Danish vessel breaking up the sea ice to serve as a rescue ship. Webster revived the play in 1874 under the title Prayer in the Storm where it ran for 143 performances (28 March - 11 September 1874), and featured Geneviève Ward.

=== Original Adelphi cast ===
- Captain De Lascours - Charles Selby
- Carlos - Benjamin Nottingham Webster
- Jean Medoc - Paul Bedford
- Pieree Pacome - R. Romer
- First Sailor - C.J. Smith
- Second Sailor - Mrs. Anders
- Barabas - Robert Keeley
- Louise de Lascours - Madame Céleste
- Marie, child - Miss Stroker
- Marquis del Monte - Benjamin Nottingham Webster
- Horace de Brionne - Mr. Garden
- Georges De Laval - Mr. Parselle
- Secretary to the Spanish Embassy - Mr. Hastings
- The Countess Theringe - Mrs. L. Murray
- Mdlle. Diana De Lascours - Miss F. Maskell

== American adaptation ==
Laura Keene produced the play in America to success as The Sea of Ice. She brought on the play at her New York theatre on 5 November 1857, where it ran until 21 December, and it saved her company financially. President Abraham Lincoln and his wife attended a Keene performance of the play in Washington, D.C., on 8 February 1864.

=== Original Keene New York cast (5 November 1857) ===
- Henri De Lascours - Charles Wheatleigh
- Louise De Lascours - Laura Keene
- Carlos - George Jordan
- Medoc - C. Peters
- Pasquin - Burke
- Marie - Mary Bullock
- Horace - G. W. Stoddart
- Don Jose - Carlton Howard
- Mlle. Diane De Theringe - Charlotte Thompson
- Barbaras - Joseph Jefferson
- Jano - F. Evans
- Georges - T. Duncan
- Countess - Mary Wells
