= Ervillers =

- Commune
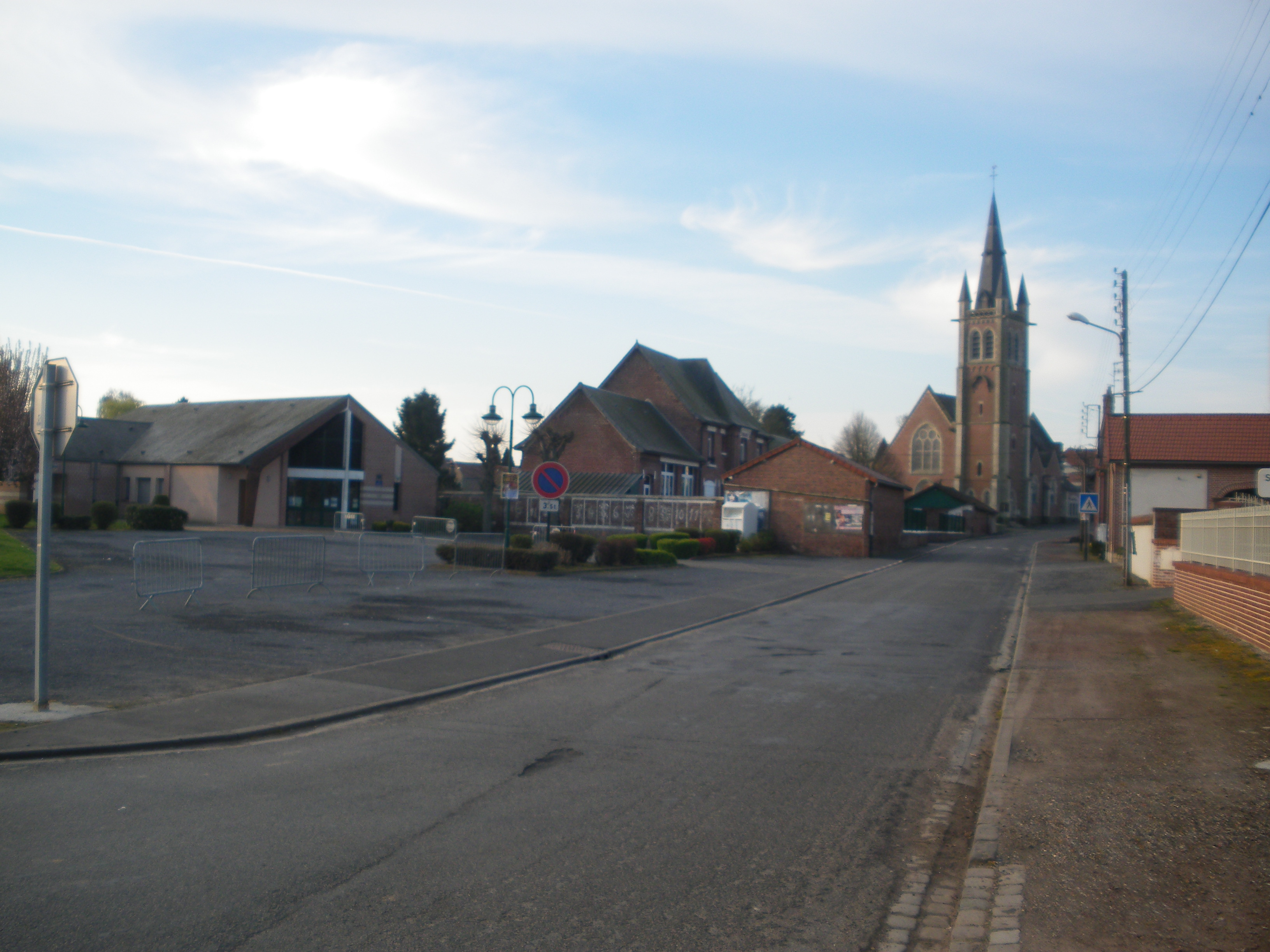
- The centre of Ervillers

- Coat of arms
- Location of Ervillers
- Location within France Location within Hauts-de-France
- Coordinates: 50°09′42″N 2°49′28″E
- Country: France
- Region: Hauts-de-France
- Department: Pas-de-Calais
- Arrondissement: Arras
- Canton: Bapaume
- Intercommunality: CC Sud-Artois

Government
  - Mayor (2020–2026): Philippe Lefort
- Area^{1}: 7.13 km^{2} (2.75 sq mi)
- Elevation: 98 m (322 ft)
- Highest elevation: 115 m (377 ft)
- Lowest elevation: 77 m (253 ft)
- Population (2023): 396
  - Density: 55.5/km^{2} (144/sq mi)
- Time zone: UTC+01:00 (CET)
  - Summer (DST): UTC+02:00 (CEST)
- INSEE/Postal code: 62306 /62121
- ^{1} French Land Register data, which excludes lakes, ponds, glaciers > 1 km^{2} (0.386 sq mi or 247 acres) and river estuaries.

Ervillers is a commune in the Pas-de-Calais department in the Hauts-de-France region of France 11 miles (18 km) south of Arras.

== Population ==
Historical population
Year	Pop.	±% p.a.
1968	398	—
1975	386	−0.44%
1982	390	+0.15%
1990	434	+1.35%
1999	449	+0.38%
2007	388	−1.81%
2012	398	+0.51%
2017	399	+0.05%
2023	396	−0.13%
Source: INSEE

== See also ==
- Communes of the Pas-de-Calais department
- Arthur Henry Cross - who won the Victoria Cross at Ervillers in 1918
