= Saint-Germain-des-Grois =

- Commune
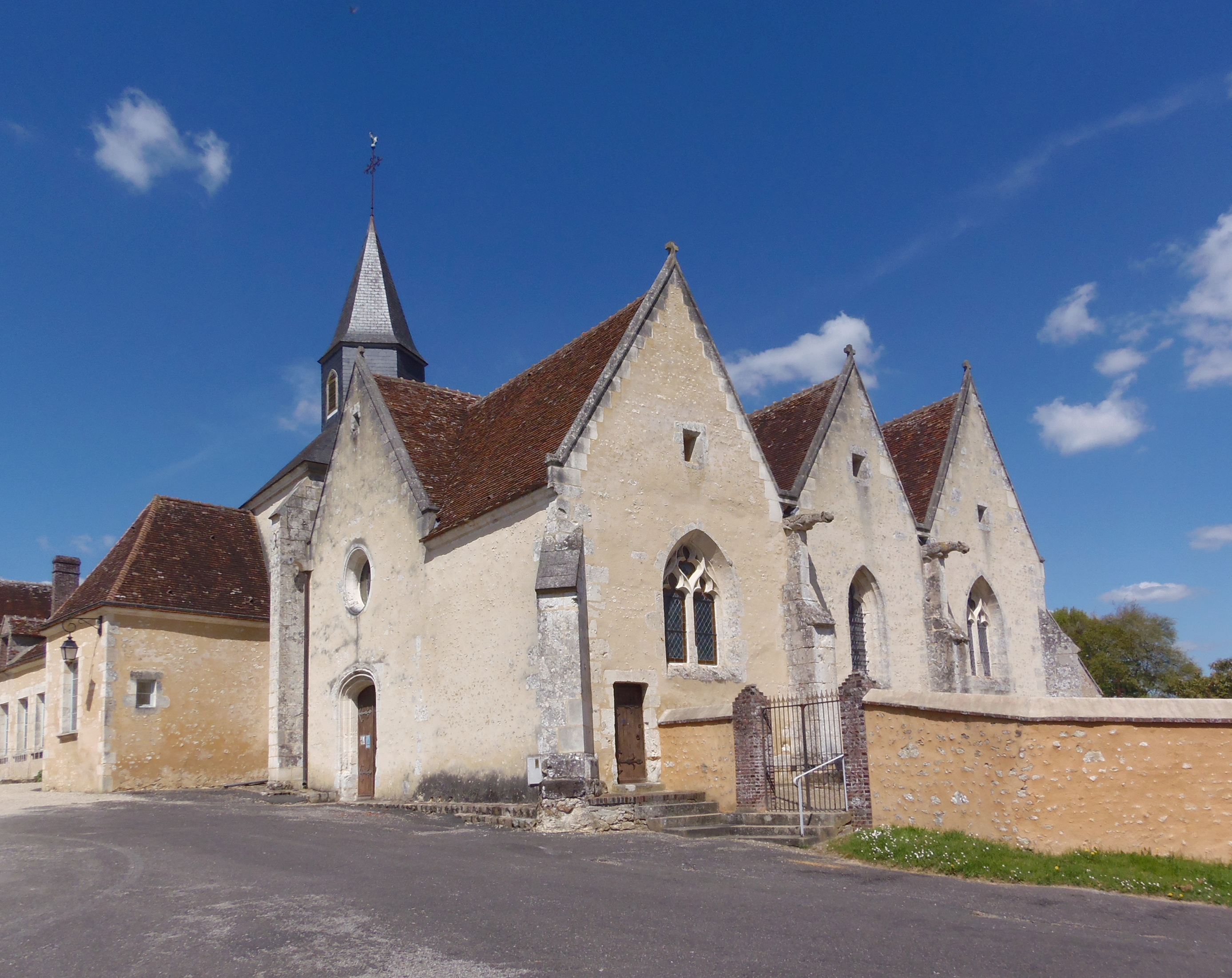
- The church in Saint-Germain-des-Grois
- Location of Saint-Germain-des-Grois
- Location within France Location within Normandy
- Coordinates: 48°23′55″N 0°49′52″E
- Country: France
- Region: Normandy
- Department: Orne
- Arrondissement: Mortagne-au-Perche
- Canton: Bretoncelles

Government
  - Mayor (2020–2026): Jean-Michel Olivier
- Area^{1}: 10.38 km^{2} (4.01 sq mi)
- Elevation: 150 m (490 ft)
- Highest elevation: 227 m (745 ft)
- Lowest elevation: 112 m (367 ft)
- Population (2023): 203
  - Density: 19.6/km^{2} (50.7/sq mi)
- Time zone: UTC+01:00 (CET)
  - Summer (DST): UTC+02:00 (CEST)
- INSEE/Postal code: 61395 /61110
- ^{1} French Land Register data, which excludes lakes, ponds, glaciers > 1 km^{2} (0.386 sq mi or 247 acres) and river estuaries.

Saint-Germain-des-Grois (French pronunciation: [sɛ̃ ʒɛʁmɛ̃ de ɡʁwa]) is a commune in the Orne department in north-western France.

== Geography ==
The Commune along with another 70 communes shares part of a 47,681 hectare, Natura 2000 conservation area, called the Forêts et étangs du Perche.

The river Huisne flows through the commune.

== Notable people ==
- Henri-Joseph Dugué de La Fauconnerie (1835-1914) a French politician who died here.

== See also ==
- Communes of the Orne department
