= Arthur Henry Cross =

English Victoria Cross recipient (1884–1965)

- Corporal Arthur Cross in c. 1919
- Born: 13 December 1884; Shipdham, Norfolk, England
- Died: 23 November 1965 (aged 80); Southwark, London, England
- Military career
- Allegiance: United Kingdom
- Branch: British Army
- Rank: Corporal
- Nickname: "Crossy"
- Units: First Surrey Rifles; Machine Gun Corps
- Conflicts: First World War
- Awards: Victoria Cross; Military Medal

Arthur Henry Cross, VC, MM (13 December 1884 – 23 November 1965) was a British Army soldier and a recipient of the Victoria Cross, the highest award for gallantry in the face of the enemy that can be awarded to British and Commonwealth forces.

== Early life ==
Cross was born in Shipdham, Norfolk, one of five children. He moved to London when aged 15. He was married and became a father at the age of 18.

== Military career ==
Cross enlisted in the 21st Battalion First Surrey Rifles, The London Regiment on 30 May 1916. In 1917, he transferred to the Machine Gun Corps. He was 33 years old, and a lance corporal in the 40th Battalion, Machine Gun Corps, when the following deed took place for which he was awarded the Victoria Cross.

On 25 March 1918 at Ervillers, France, Lance Corporal Cross volunteered to make a reconnaissance of the position of two machine-guns which had been captured by the enemy. With the agreement of his sergeant he crept back alone with only a service revolver to what had been his section's trench and was now the enemy's. He surprised seven soldiers who responded by throwing down their rifles. He then marched them carrying the machine guns complete with the tripods and ammunition to the British lines. He then handed over the prisoners and collected teams for his guns which he brought into action immediately, annihilating a very heavy attack by the enemy.

The Victoria Cross was given for "extreme gallantry, initiative and dash". In June he was awarded the Military Medal for another act of bravery.

== Legacy ==
Cross received an engraved gold watch upon visiting his old village, and later a road there was named after him. Cross offered the use of his VC as a prop in the film Carrington V.C. where it was worn by David Niven in the title role.

Cross died on 23 November 1965 and was buried in the family grave at Streatham Vale Cemetery, Plot E, Square 27, Grave 885, joining his second wife along with their two children. His medals, including the VC and Military Medal, were sold for £185,000 by Spink's of London on 19 April 2012.

== Bibliography ==
- Gliddon, Gerald (2013). Spring Offensive 1918. VCs of the First World War. Stroud: History Press. ISBN 978-0-7524-8730-4.
