= Charles Harcourt =

British actor

Charles Harcourt (real name Charles Parker Hillier) (1838–1880) was a British actor.

Harcourt was born in June 1838. After obtaining some experience by acting with amateurs, he made his first public appearance at St. James's Theatre, London, on 30 March 1863, as Robert Audley in a dramatic version of Mary Elizabeth Braddon's novel Lady Audley's Secret. In February 1866 he was seen at Drury Lane as Baron Steinfort in The Stranger, in January 1867 as Frank Rochdale in John Bull, and in March 1868 as Count Henry de Villetaneuve in The Prisoner of Toulon.

He had engagements at the Royalty Theatre, at the Strand, at the Charing Cross, 1872, and at the Globe in the following year. From Easter 1871 to Easter 1872 he was the lessee of the Marylebone Theatre. Some of the most important parts he played were Captain Absolute at the Charing Cross, November 1872; Claude Melnotte at the Haymarket, May 1876; Pygmalion in the revival of Gilbert's Pygmalion and Galatea at the same house, January 1877; and Count d'Aubeterre in Proof at the Adelphi, 1878. He afterwards appeared as Mercutio in Romeo and Juliet, a part which he acted with spirit and discretion, and of which after the death of George Vining he was the best exponent. His last impersonation was the outcast Bashford in The World at Drury Lane, 1880.

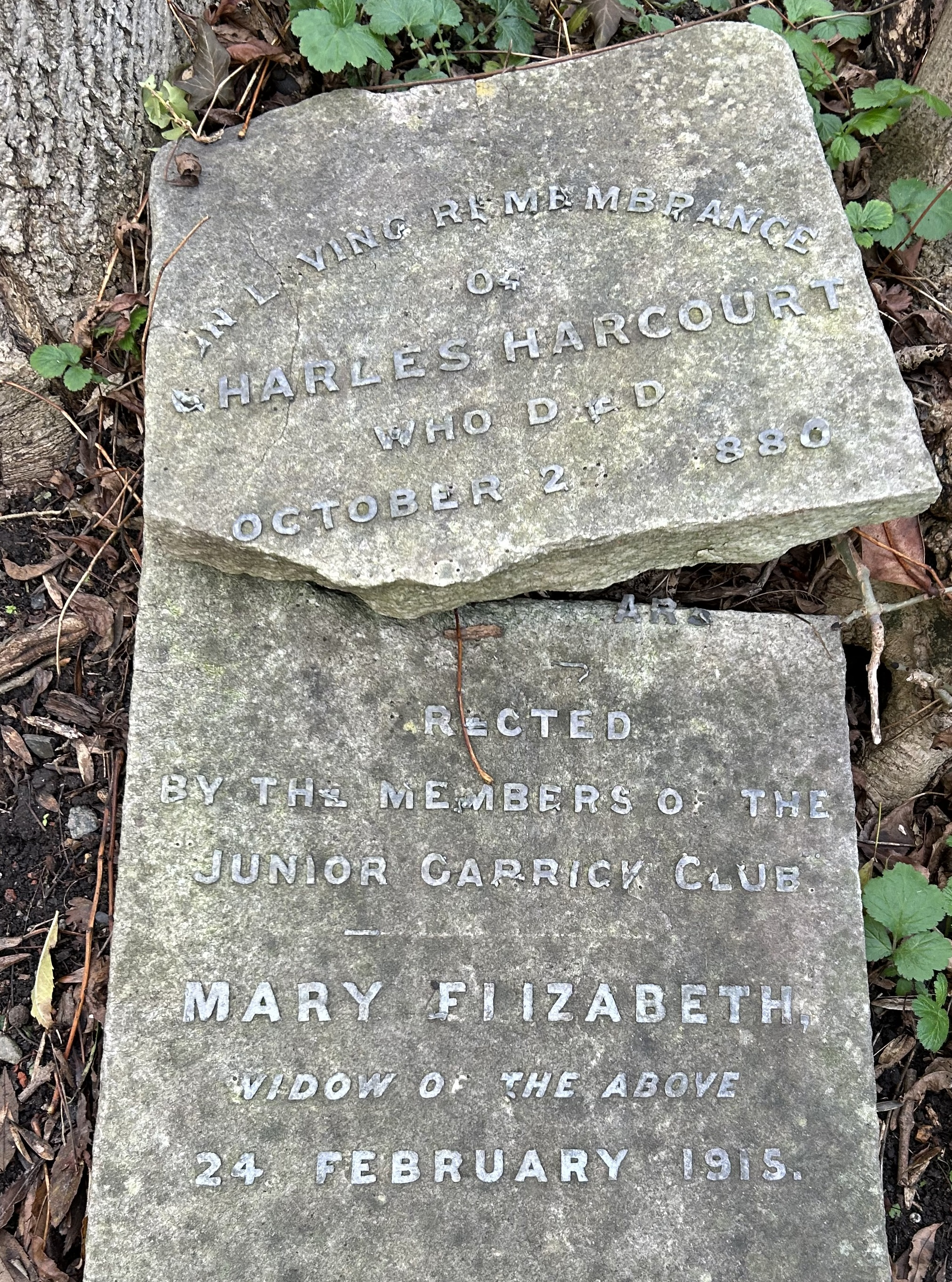
Grave of Charles Harcourt in Highgate Cemetery

He was an able, vigorous, and conscientious actor. From January 1880 he was the secretary of the National Dramatic Academy. On 18 October 1880 he, while rehearsing the character of Horatio at the Haymarket Theatre, fell into the scene dock at the back of the stage, inadvertently left open.

He died of erysipelas on 28 October at the Charing Cross Hospital, and was buried at Highgate Cemetery on 2 November, leaving a widow and one daughter.
