= Streatham Park Cemetery =

Cemetery in England

Coordinates: 51.406°N 0.145°W

- Interactive map of Streatham Park Cemetery

Details
- Established: 1909
- Location: Rowan Road, Greyhound Lane Streatham, London. SW16 5JG
- Find a Grave: Streatham Park Cemetery

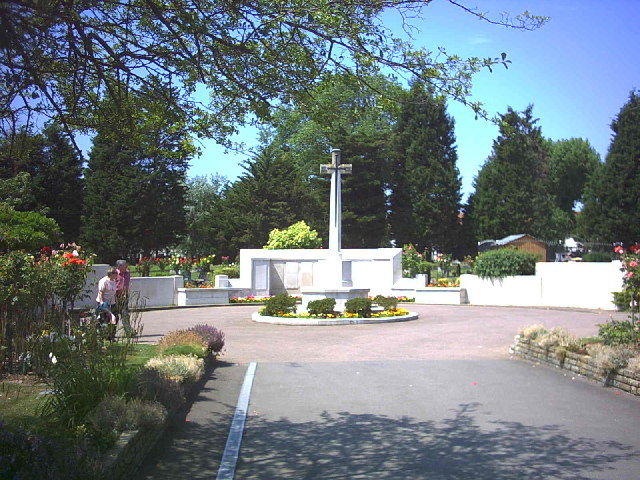
Cross of Sacrifice and Screen Wall Memorial at Streatham Park Cemetery

South London Crematorium and Streatham Park Cemetery is a cemetery and crematorium on Rowan Road in Streatham Vale. Although it is located in Streatham and managed by the London Borough of Lambeth, it actually lies within the boundaries of the London Borough of Merton. It has always been privately owned and managed and is now part of the Dignity plc group . The South London Crematorium is situated within the cemetery grounds and opened in 1936.

== History ==
Streatham Park Cemetery is laid out in a grid pattern and opened as the Great Southern Cemetery in 1909 but was originally planned in 1890 to match the Great Northern Cemetery that opened in 1861 in Southgate. The cemetery buildings included a lodge, an Anglican Chapel and a small Roman Catholic chapel designed by John Bannen who also designed the Crematorium. The Crematorium had been planned from 1913 but was not built until 1936, the delay owing to the start of World War I. The cemetery lodge and Roman Catholic chapel have since been demolished while the original Anglican chapel later re-opened as the cemetery office. The cemetery has various gardens of remembrance, including rose gardens. Frederick Field (died 1923), a founder of the cemetery, is buried here.

The cemetery has a long connection with the Variety Artistes' Benevolent Fund (VABF), with about 200 variety artistes and music hall performers buried here between 1921 and 1944 and a memorial. A Chapel of Remembrance was added in 1958 at the request of the VABF.

Up to World War II the cemetery accounted for one fifth of all burials in South London. The cemetery has a large number of burials from World War I (118) and World War II (290) which are maintained by the Commonwealth War Graves Commission (CWGC) and has a Cross of Sacrifice and Screen Wall Memorial, the latter commemorating casualties of both wars who are buried in this cemetery in graves which could not be marked by headstones. After World War II another wing was added to the memorial on which are commemorated the names of 123 personnel who died during that conflict and were cremated at the South London Crematorium, which is situated within the cemetery.

== South London Crematorium ==
South London Crematorium, designed by John Bannen, was opened in 1936 on the site of Streatham Park Cemetery. The chapel can accommodate larger funerals and offers a service time of 45 minutes, which is longer than many other crematoria. Gardens of remembrance feature a variety of personalised memorials and mausoleum burials.

== Streatham Park Cemetery ==
Famous names to have been buried here include the internationally renowned singer, Dorothy Squires, comedian Tom Costello and music hall performer Harry Paulo.

== Streatham Park Jewish Cemetery ==
Streatham Park Jewish Cemetery
- Interactive map of Streatham Park Jewish Cemetery

Details
- Established: 1915
- Location: Rowan Road, Greyhound Lane Streatham, London. SW16 5JF
- Type: Jewish
- Owned by: Western Charitable Foundation
- Website: Official website
- Find a Grave: Streatham Park Jewish Cemetery

Streatham Park Jewish Cemetery opened in 1915 as a section of Streatham Park Cemetery. The majority of burials here are those of Ashkenazi Jews of eastern European origin who settled in the Soho area of London working as tailors, cabinetmakers, shopkeepers, etc. A small section of Streatham Park Cemetery is reserved for members of the South London Liberal Synagogue. This cemetery contains the Commonwealth war graves of 13 service personnel from World War II.

== Notable burials ==
- Brian Barder
- Wilfrid Brambell (cremated)
- Norman Clapham, variety artist and radio comedian
- Tom Costello
- Arthur Henry Cross VC
- John Cura
- Desmond Dekker
- Daisy Dormer (cremated)
- June Duprez
- Gus Elen
- Florrie Forde
- Will Hay
- William Jex
- Frank Howard Kirby VC, CBE, DCM
- Charlie Kunz
- Lupino Lane
- Tom Leamore
- Olive Morris
- Nellie Navette
- Cynthia Payne
- Dan Rolyat
- Jack Spurling (1870–1933) Marine Artist
- Dorothy Squires
- Joseph Tabrar
- Ben Warriss
