= Ferdinand Dugué =

French poet and playwright

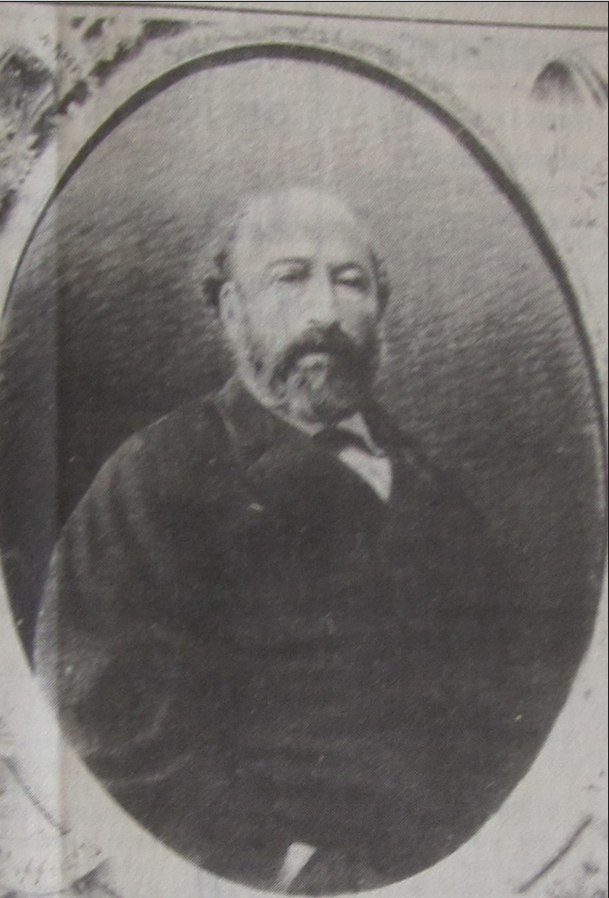
- Born: Ferdinand Adrien Joseph Dugué; 18 February 1816; Chartres
- Died: 6 December 1913 (aged 97); Paris
- Occupations: Poet; Playwright
- Spouse: Henriette Joséphine Béguin

Ferdinand Dugué (18 February 1816 – 5 December 1913) was a 19th-century French poet and playwright. He wrote poetry and both comic and dramatic plays, some of them in collaboration. He also authored studies about historic personalities such as Mathurin Régnier and Salvator Rosa.

== Biography ==
=== Family ===
Dugué was born in Chartres, the son of Pierre-Joseph Dugué de La Fauconnerie, a lawyer, and Barbe Victoire Thérèse Feron.

On 20 November 1840, he married Henriette Joséphine Béguin, daughter of a naval officer, with whom he would celebrate their 70th anniversary of marriage in 1910. The bridal blessing took place in the chapel of the Paris Foreign Missions Society, rue du Bac.

The politician Henri-Joseph Dugué de La Fauconnerie was his nephew.

=== Youth ===
He grew up in a house in the cloister Notre-Dame à Chartres. After attending college in that city, he continued his studies in Paris, hosted by the Pension Landry, where he earned a mention at the Concours général in 1830. The City of Chartres held a ceremony in his honor at the Hotel de Ville on 12 September 1830 in the presence of mayor Adelphe Chasles, who crowned him with golden crown of oak, and the College of Chartres principal, abbot Calluet.

=== Career ===
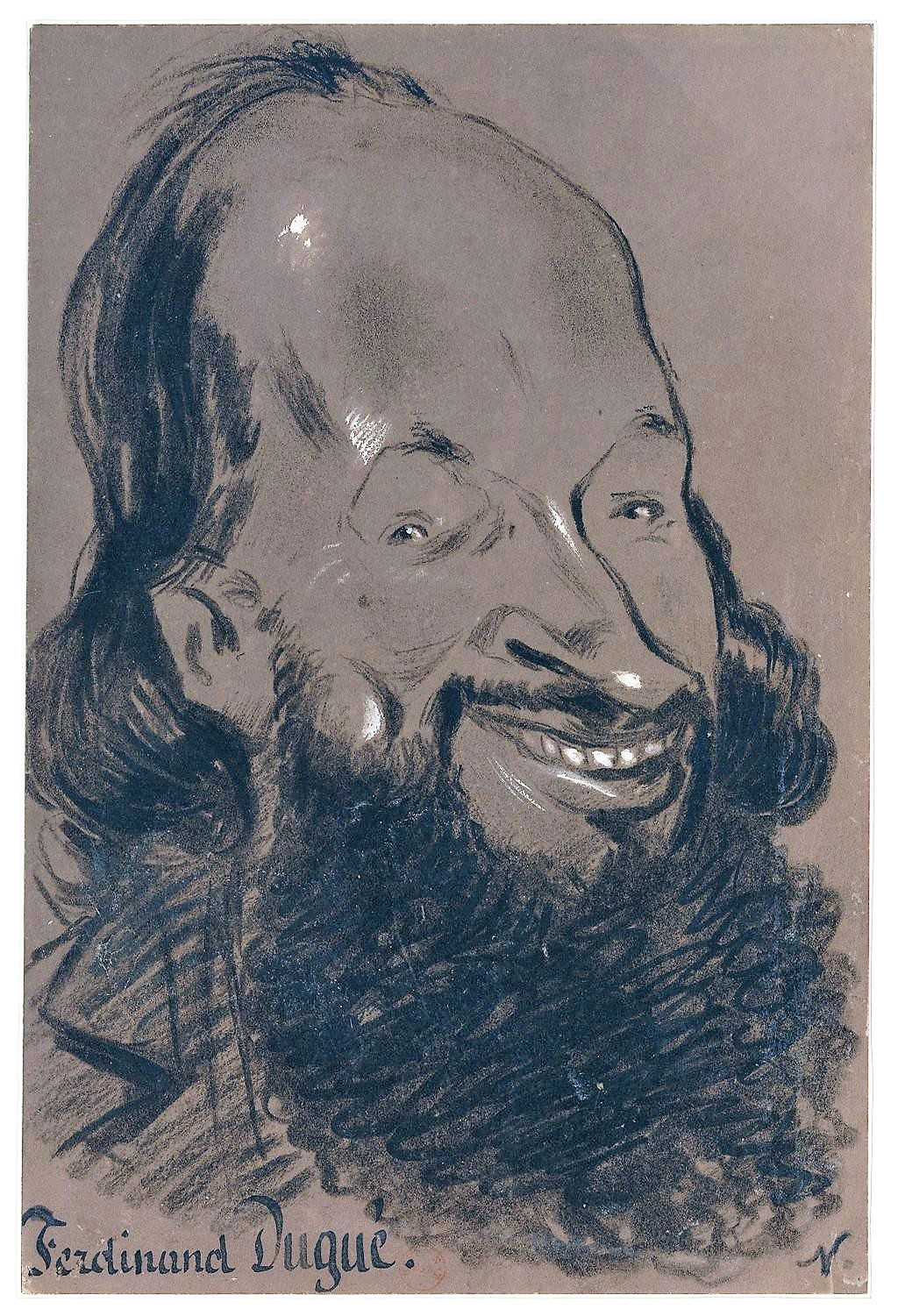
Caricature of Ferdinand Dugué

One of Dugué's best known works was his romantic drama about the Italian painter Salvator Rosa; this was well-received when performed at the Théâtre de Porte-Saint-Martin in 1851 and was revived several times. Another work was his 1857 play about William Shakespeare; drawing on the rather meagre historical facts available, this play brought the playwright to life, creating an easily believable portrait of what he might have been like.

Dugué was vice-president of the Société des Auteurs et Compositeurs Dramatiques. In 1870, he was appointed chief patriot of the National Defence for the north canton of Chartres. Born the year after the Battle of Waterloo and died the year before the beginning of World War I, Duguée's life spanned a major part of the history of France since he also witnessed the Franco-Prussian War of 1870. When he died aged 97, the French theater era of vaudevilles and conventional comedies was getting very near its end. He lived long enough to see the emergence of modern genres of theater, starting with Ubu Roi in 1896, which would eventually lead to the post World War II Theatre of the Absurd.

=== Events ===
In 1870, Dugué confronted the Prussian army and told with humour this episode:

On October 21, 1870, the Prussians reached Mainvilliers and soon a rain of shells and shrapnel fell on the village. The shells searched my small park with mathematical precision and they spared my house, it was probably because a high forest of oak masked the enemies pointers. I had with me forty national Mainvilliers guards. We heard several times over our heads quick whistles and violent cracking of whips. Never mind, can't I help but say, laughing at one of my neighbors, they obusent the situation. Suddenly the earth flew near me, and I felt a strong shock, "Sir", quietly shouted our bugle, "it's just sank into the carrot field". We had to leave Mainvilliers, the Germans, when they entered my house, riddled my portrait with bayonets; it is always in my living room, decorated with these moles. A few days later, I read in a Prussian paper: "Our glorious army entered Chartres after taking the Mainvilliers fort". My house, a fort! It is a fort almost like it's a castle!

On 20 September 1900, at the request of local authorities, he hosted a country breakfast held in the park of his castle of Mainvilliers, Eure-et-Loir, for the president Émile Loubet, who had come to attend a military review.

=== Quote ===
Asked in 1910 by the newspaper Le Gaulois on what he thought of contemporary theater movement, Dugué replied: "Only one thing surprises me it is that theater has not succumbed already under the onslaught of its three mortal enemies, pornography, music hall and cinema."

== Works ==
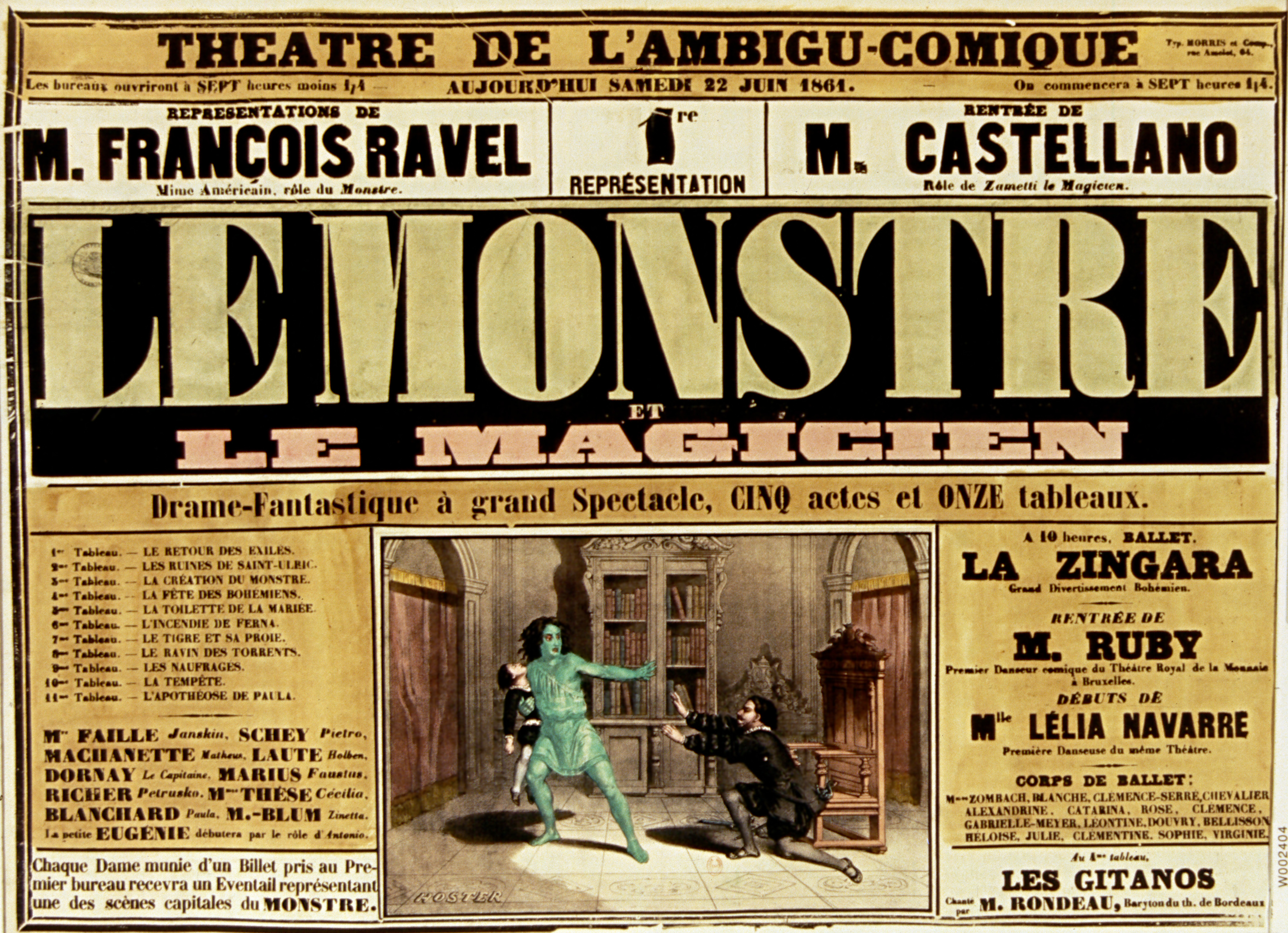
Théâtre de L'Ambigu comique... Today, Saturday, June 22, 1861... Performances by Mr. François Ravel, American mime, role of the monster. Return of Mr. Castellano, role of Zametti the magician. First performance: The Monster and the Magician. Fantasy drama with a grand spectacle, five acts and eleven tableaux...[by Ferdinand Dugué] poster.

- 1836: Les horizons de la poésie, (his first published work)
- 1836: Geoffroy Rudel, roman en deux volumes (novel in two volumes).
- 1839: Le Vol des heures, poetry, Eugène Renduel, printer in Paris.
- 1840: Les gouttes de rosée (poetry)
- 1845: Les Pharaons
- 1850: L'Oasis (poetry)
- 1850: La Misère
- 1851: Mathurin Regnier, study on Mathurin Régnier
- 1851: Monsieur Pinchard, drama in 5 acts
- 1852: Rauquelaure*1850 La Misère
- 1854: Le Juif de Venise, drama in 5 acts and 7 tableaux
- 1854: Les Amours maudits, drama in 5 acts
- 1855: André le mineur, drama in 5 acts
- 1856: Le Paradis perdu, drama in 5 acts and 12 tableaux, (with Adolphe d'Ennery)
- 1859: Cartouche, drame nouveau in five acts (eight tableaux)
- 1859: La Fille du Tintoret, drama in five acts and six tableaux
- 1859: Les Pirates de la Savane, drama extravaganza in five acts and six tableaux, (with Auguste Anicet-Bourgeois)
- 1861: The Monster and the Magician, drama in 5 acts and 11 tableaux
- 1861: La Fille des chiffonniers, drama in 5 acts and 8 tableaux, (with Anicet-Bourgeois)
- 1862: La Bouquetière des Innocents, drama in 5 acts and 11 tableaux, (with Anicet-Bourgeois)
- 1863: France de Simiers, drama in 5 acts, in verse
- 1864: Le Château de Pontalec, (with Adolphe d'Ennery and Emile Abraham)
- 1865: Marie de Mancini, drama in 5 acts and 8 tableaux, (with Adolphe d'Ennery)
- 1866: Salvator Rosa, study on Salvator Rosa
- 1867: Maximilien, poésie
- 1871: Les Éclats d'obus, E. Dentu, éditeur à Paris, 1871.
- 1873: Ismène, comedy in three acts and in verse
- 1874: Cocagne, drama in 5 acts and 8 tableaux, (with Anicet-Bourgeois)
- 1875: Les Fugitifs, (with Auguste Anicet-Bourgeois)
- 1881: Les Épaves, E. Dentu, éditeur à Paris.
- 1891: Théâtre complet, 5 volumes, Calmann-Lévy, éditeur à Paris, 1891.
- Published in 1853, la Prière des Naufragés :« J'ai besoin par instant de rugir comme les bêtes féroces et de bondir comme les flots de l'Océan.– J'étouffe ici ! »
  ("I sometimes need to roar like wild beasts and leap like the waves of the Océan.- I suffocate here!") (adapted into English under names including The Sea of Ice)

== Sources ==
- Dugué (Ferdinand), in Pierre Larousse, Grand dictionnaire universel du XIXe siècle, 15 vol., 1863–1890.
