= William Jex =

English footballer

Personal information
- Date of birth: 23 March 1885
- Place of birth: Thorpe, Norwich, England
- Date of death: 19 February 1934 (aged 48)
- Place of death: Dulwich, England
- Position: Inside left

Senior career*
Years	Team	Apps	(Gls)
1903–1905	Thorpe Village		
1905–1906	Norwich CEYMS		
1906–1908	Norwich City	10	(3)
1908–1909	Doncaster Rovers	27	(20)
1909–1910	Rotherham Town		
1910–1911	Doncaster Rovers	38	(23)
1911–1912	Gainsborough Trinity	6	(0)
1912–1913	Croydon Common	6	(3)
1913–1914	Doncaster Rovers	?	(6)
- * Club domestic league appearances and goals

William Jex (23 March 1885 − 19 February 1934) was an English footballer who played as an inside left with Norwich City, Doncaster Rovers, Rotherham Town and Croydon Common, and in the Football League with Gainsborough Trinity in the early 20th century. He was Doncaster's top scorer in each of the three seasons he played for them.

Jex was born in Thorpe Hamlet, a suburb of Norwich, and by trade he was a painter and decorator. He is said to have developed a weak heart after catching a fever following a swim in the River Wensum in Norwich.

== Career ==
His first known clubs are his local side, Thorpe Village, and then Norwich CYMS where he was playing when he first represented Norfolk in 1905 at the age of 19. Southern League side Norwich City signed him in 1906 though his debut on 29 March against QPR was his only appearance in that first season. In 1907–08, he played 9 times in the league, scoring 3 goals, and one match in the FA Cup.

Along with City goalkeeper Fred Thompson, Jex headed north to Doncaster Rovers who were playing in the Midland League. That season Doncaster finished 11th with Jex scoring an excellent 20 goals in his 27 league games, and once in the Sheffield and Hallamshire Senior Cup.

At the end of the season he moved to fellow Midland League side Rotherham Town, who had been runners up in the league, though that season they had their worst league finish of 17th out of 22, and Jex was re−signed by Doncaster for the following season, 1910–11. He played in all 38 league matches and ended up joint top scorer with 23, including two hat−tricks, as Doncaster finished in third position. He also scored 5 times in the FA Cup, with 3 of those in a hat-trick against Grimsby Rovers.

He and teammate Sam Gunton, who'd also come to Rovers from Norwich, then went to Gainsborough Trinity who were in Division Two of the Football League, though after making only 6 starts with no goals, in April 1912 he moved to London club Croydon Common who were playing in the Southern League. With 3 goals in just 6 league matches and no goals in the 5 cup games, he headed back to Doncaster in late September 1914 but his season was disrupted as, just before Christmas, he injured his foot at the Plant Works when a heavy trolley ran over it, leaving him out of the side till April. Even with just the 6 goals, he again was top scorer for the season at Doncaster. In all competitions, he made nearly 100 appearances for Doncaster.

A description of Jex was:

"he is short, but very quick in his stride, he is pluck personified."

== Later life ==
He died in Dulwich Hospital in London at the age of 48 after a short illness started by catching a chill, and is buried in Streatham Park Cemetery near Croydon.
