= Harry Paulo =

Music hall artist and clown (1847–1932)

- Born: Thomas Henry Chandler; 1846; Marylebone, London, England
- Died: 1932; London, England
- Years active: 1870–1932
- Known for: Music hall performer
- Spouse(s): Adelaide Gertrude Britland; Emma Cox

Thomas Henry Chandler (1847–1932), was a music hall entertainer noted for performing as Harry Paulo, a clown.

== Career ==
Paulo rose to fame in the 1870s, starring in London performances such as This is the House that Jack built; or, Harlequin Pussy Cat, Where Have You Been? The Little Wee Dog and the Good Child's History of England at the Prince Alfred, The Adventures of Sir Job at the Cremorne Gardens, and Little Boy Blue at the Marylebone Theatre. One of his early successes was playing a herald that could only read proclamations backwards. He was a regular on the stage in comedic roles, and as early as 1881, was called a "celebrated clown" by the London Weekly Dispatch newspaper.

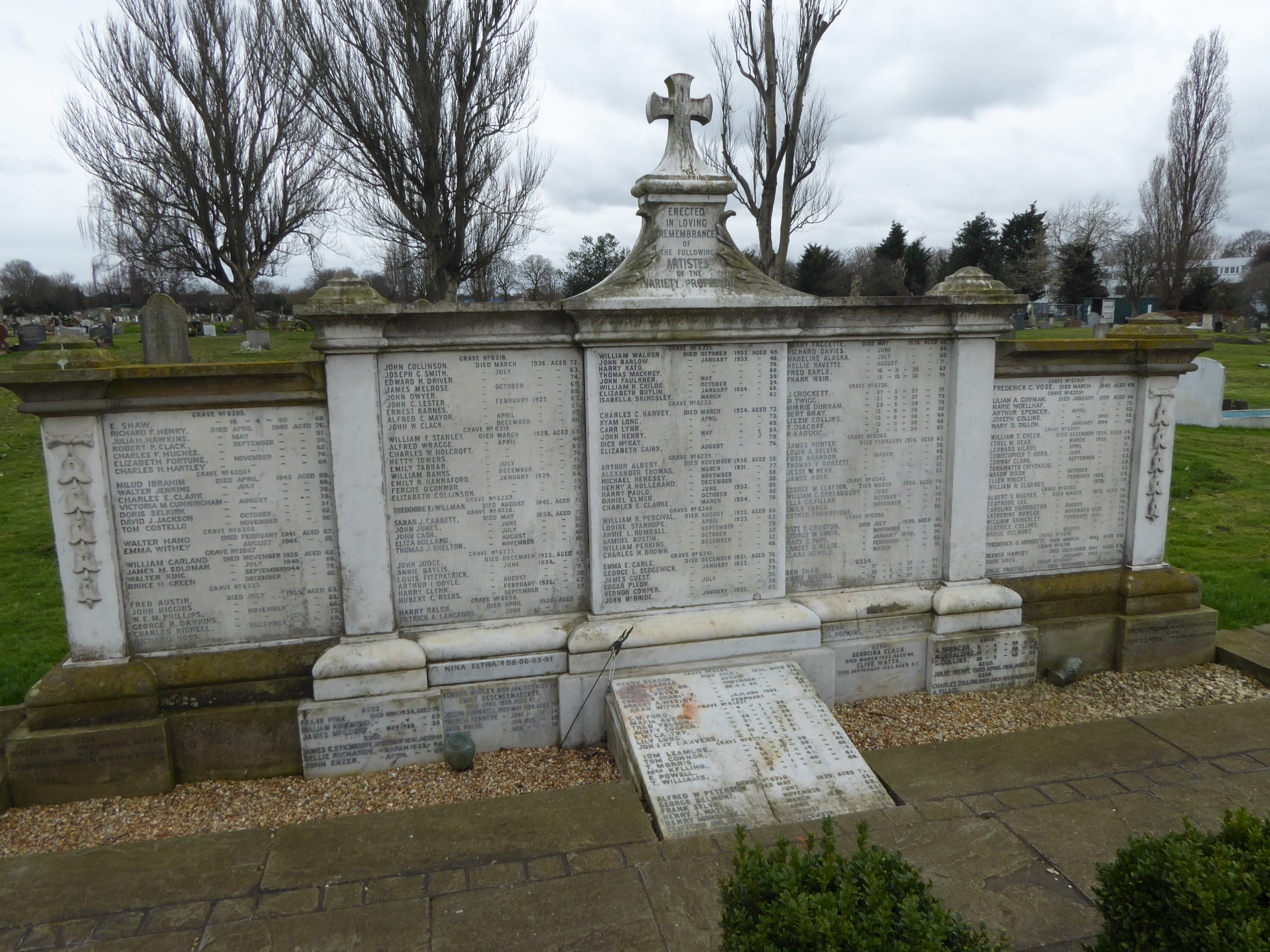
Streatham Park Cemetery Artistes Memorial, which commemorates Paulo and other well known performers

In the 1890s, Paulo revived the clown Grimaldi's famous song "Hot Codlins" for music hall audiences, "evoked roars of laughter" performing as Granny in Little Red Riding Hood, and often starred in harlequinades. Paulo toured across Europe and the British Isles until his death.

In 1924, he attended a gathering of "the Aristocracy of the Harlequinade". In 1931, he was described by the Era newspaper as "second to none in wielding the red-hot poker in his day. At eighty-four he is the oldest of the living clowns though the halest and heartiest of his contemporaries".

Paulo died in 1932, and is commemorated on the Streatham Park Cemetery Artistes Memorial in London.
