= Daisy Dormer =

British music hall singer (1883–1947)

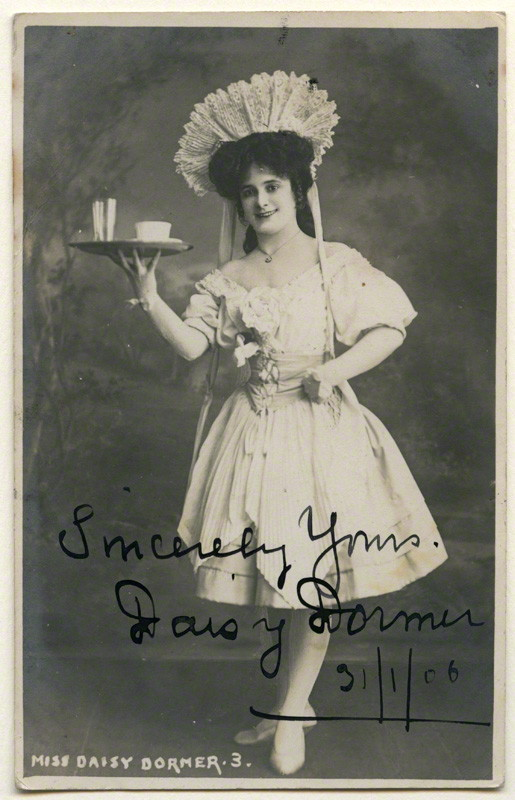
- Dormer in 1906
- Born: Kezia Beatrice Stockwell; 16 January 1883; Southsea, England
- Died: 13 September 1947 (aged 64); Wandsworth, London
- Occupation: Music hall singer
- Spouse: Albert Jee

Daisy Dormer (born Kezia Beatrice Stockwell, 16 January 1883 – 13 September 1947) was a British music hall performer.

== Early life ==
Kezia Beatrice Stockwell was born on 16 January 1883 in Southsea to Mary and Henry John Stockwell. Her father was a riveter at HM Dockyard Portsmouth. She began her stage career as a dancer in her home town at the age of six. She was pretty, slight and dark-haired and projected a figure of innocence.

== Career ==
She started her performing career as Dainty Daisy Dimple and appeared in theatres and music halls under this name until February 1901, when she announced in The Era that she ‘will in future be known as Dainty Daisy Dormer’.

The song which launched her career was a Charles Collins and Tom Mellor composition, “I Wouldn’t Leave My Little Wooden Hut For You”, which she first sang in 1905.

A pretty, waif-like presence, Dormer sang "After the Ball is Over" among other popular songs. "After the Ball is Over", which was written by Charles K. Harris, helped to establish Tin Pan Alley as a centre for the music business in the 1890s. The sheet music sold over five million copies in the 1890s.

== Pantomime ==
Daisy had a long career in pantomime, appearing as Queen Zaza in "Hop-O'-My-Thumb" at the Theatre Royal, Drury Lane production in 1911. The cast also included Barry Lupino, Will Evans, George Graves and Violet Loraine. In 1915, Daisy appeared as Principal Girl, Goody, in "Goody Two Shoes" at the Prince's Theatre, Park Row, Bristol. Lupino Lane was also in the cast.

== Film ==
Daisy appeared in only one silent film, Potted Pantomimes, directed by W.P. Kellino, starring famous stage star Lillian Russell and music hall comedians the Egbert Brothers made at Vaudefilms (Gaumont) Film Co in 1914.

She appeared in one talkie playing the role of Mrs. Deakin in City of Beautiful Nonsense with Emlyn Williams in 1935.

== Personal life ==
She married Albert Jee in April 1908, better known by his stage name, Albert Egbert, one-half of the Egbert Brothers. They ran The Sun Hotel in Godalming.

== Death ==
Daisy Dormer died at her home in Clapham, London on 13 September 1947. She was cremated at Streatham Park Cemetery.

Her name is commemorated by Daisy Dormer Court on the Trinity Gardens estate in Brixton.

== Works ==
Her other songs included:

- Hey! Ho! Can't You Hear the Steamer by Harry Gifford and Fred Godfrey
- Colombo (On My Catamaran) by AJ Mills and Bennett Scott
- Where the Black-Eyed Susans Grow by Dave Radford and Richard A Whiting
- Some Sunday Morning by Gus Khan, Raymond Egan and Richard A Whiting
- When You're A Long, Long Way From Home by Sam M Lewis and Geo W Meyer
- The Girl in the Clogs and Shawl by Harry Castling and C. W. Murphy
- There's a Light That's Burning in the Window by Ballard Macdonald, Joe Goodwin & Harry Puck
- Fares Please! (The Tram-Conductor Girl) by Bert Lee
- Dancing 'Neath the Irish Moon by Harry Puck and Ballard Macdonald
- What You've Got, Look After! by Charles Collins and EW Rogers
- When Will the Sun Shine for Me? by Benny Davis and Abner Silver
- I Like Your Old French Bonnet by Tom Mellor, Alf J Lawrance and Harry Gifford
- Why Don't You Come Around and See Me? by Tom Mellor, Alf J Lawrance and Harry Gifford
- If You Don't Wants Lots of Gold by Tom Mellor, Alf J Lawrance and Harry Gifford
