= Harry Randall (actor) =

English actor and comedian

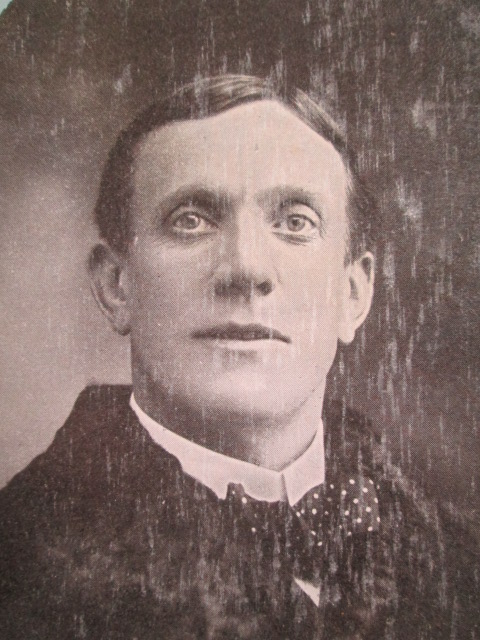
- Harry Randall
- Born: Thomas William Randall; 22 March 1857; High Holborn, London, U.K.
- Died: 18 May 1932 (aged 75); Hendon, North London, U.K.
- Resting place: Hampstead Cemetery, West Hampstead, London, U.K.
- Occupations: Actor, comedian
- Years active: 1868–1913
- Spouse: Annie Randall (died 1913)

Harry Randall (born Thomas William Randall; 22 March 1857 – 18 May 1932) was an English comic actor in music halls and pantomime.

After performing as an amateur from age 11, he made his first professional music hall appearance in 1883, quickly gaining notice. By the 1890s, he was a popular pantomime dame. With Dan Leno, Herbert Campbell and Fred Williams, he formed a theatre management company, operating and building several theatres, including the Grand Theatre, Clapham. The enterprise failed after a few years.

In 1903 Randall appeared for the first time at the Theatre Royal, Drury Lane with Leno and Campbell. After their deaths in 1904, he continued in the dame roles for several more years at Drury Lane and also performed in music halls. He retired in 1913.

== Early life ==
Randall was born in High Holborn in London in 1857. His father, a bootmaker, initially wanted his son to work as a stone engraver, but Randall wasn't enthusiastic about this career. Randall became an amateur actor, making his first appearance on stage at the age of 11 as an extra at the Princess's Theatre, London. As a youth he spent his time touring various hotels, performing monologues and short, one-man sketches.

He first appeared professionally at Deacon's Music Hall in Islington, London in 1883 and the following year, he was engaged in his first major performance at the Oxford Music Hall and then the London Pavilion. After these performances he became well-known performer in music halls in the capital. One of his most popular songs was "I'm the Ghost of John James Christopher Benjamin Binns".

Randall's first provincial tour came in 1886, and he made his pantomime debut the same year at the Theatre Royal, Birmingham as "Will Atkins" in Robinson Crusoe. He became a popular pantomime dame at the Grand Theatre, Islington, where he appeared in shows including Old Mother Hubbard and Dick Whittington; he played there for ten consecutive years from 1891.

== Theatre consortium ==
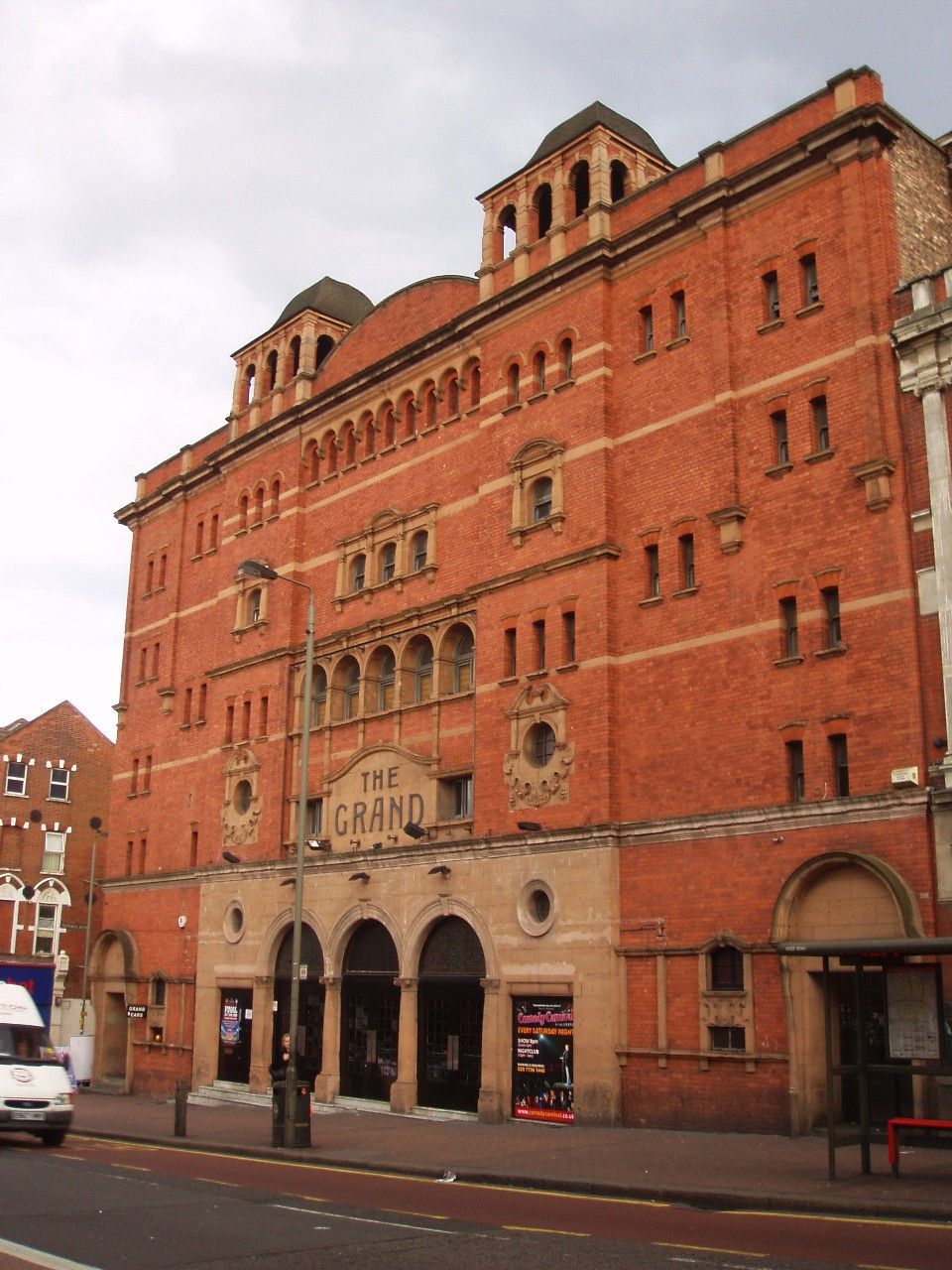
Grand Theatre, Clapham

During the 1890s, Randall, together with comedians Dan Leno, Herbert Campbell and Fred Williams, formed a theatre management company. After taking over a theatre at Clapham Junction, Munt's Hall, which was renamed the Grand Hall of Varieties, the company went on to build the Granville Theatre in Walham Green, the Palace Theatre in Camberwell (both of which have since been demolished) and the Grand Theatre, Clapham, which was built in 1900. The enterprise, opposed by managers of other theatres, failed after a few years.

== Later years ==
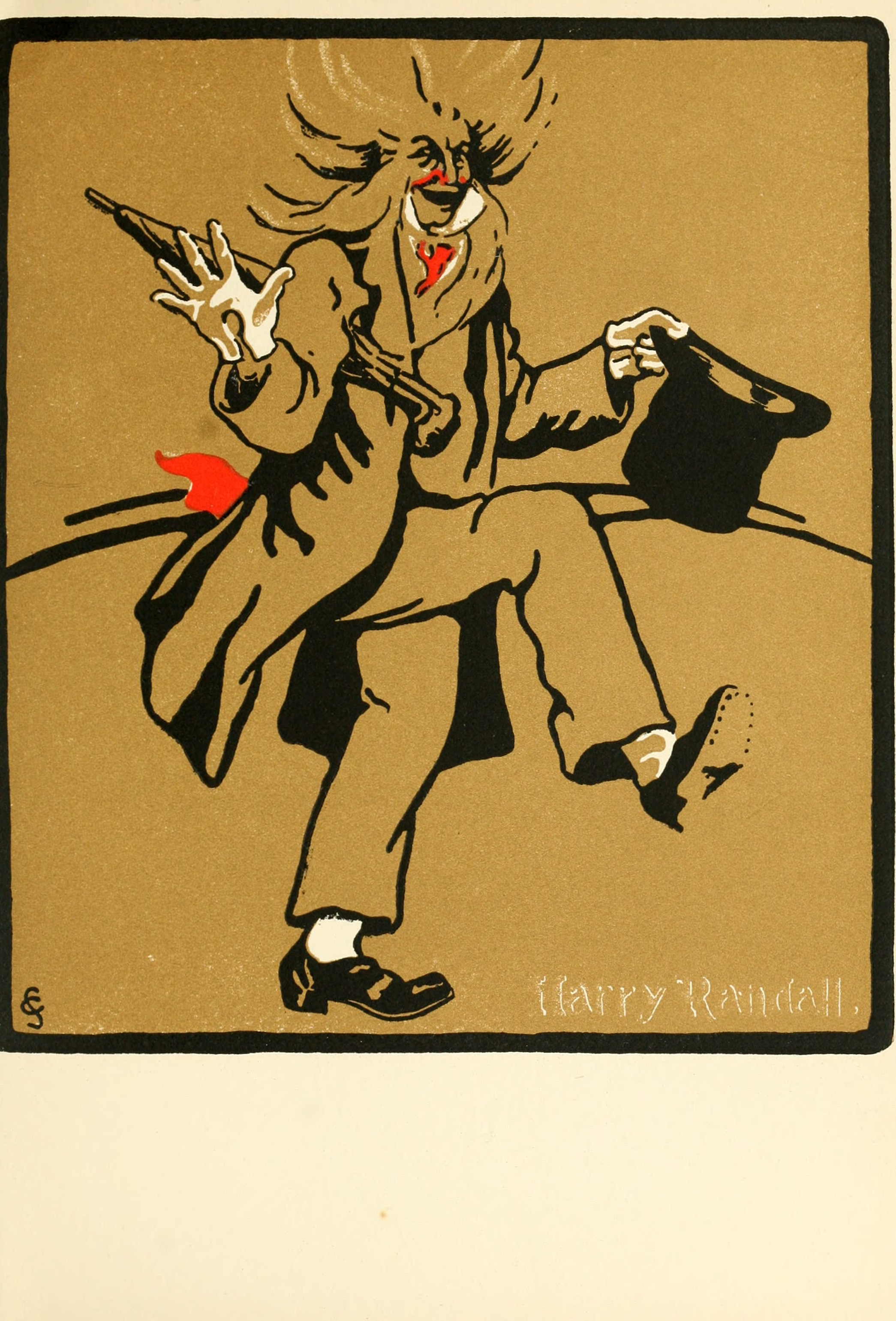
Illustration of Harry Randall, 1899

In 1903 Randall appeared for the first time at the Theatre Royal, Drury Lane in Humpty Dumpty, as "second Dame" supporting Leno, who was in poor health. Campbell was also in the production. After Leno and Campbell's deaths in 1904, Randall continued for several more years at Drury Lane, in the role of Dame. In 1905 he travelled to Colwyn Bay, Wales, where he appeared on the Victoria Pier in a short sketch entitled "The Plumber". The Folkestone, Hythe, Sandgate & Cheriton Herald reported that his performance provided the audience with "a thrilling experience" who rewarded the comedian by "clapping so hard that the building rang with loud applause". In 1909 he appeared at the Empire, Leicester Square, where he performed "Harry the Handy Man" and a slavery song which the Yorkshire Evening Post called "extremely clever" owing to the "inimitable style which is peculiarly his own."

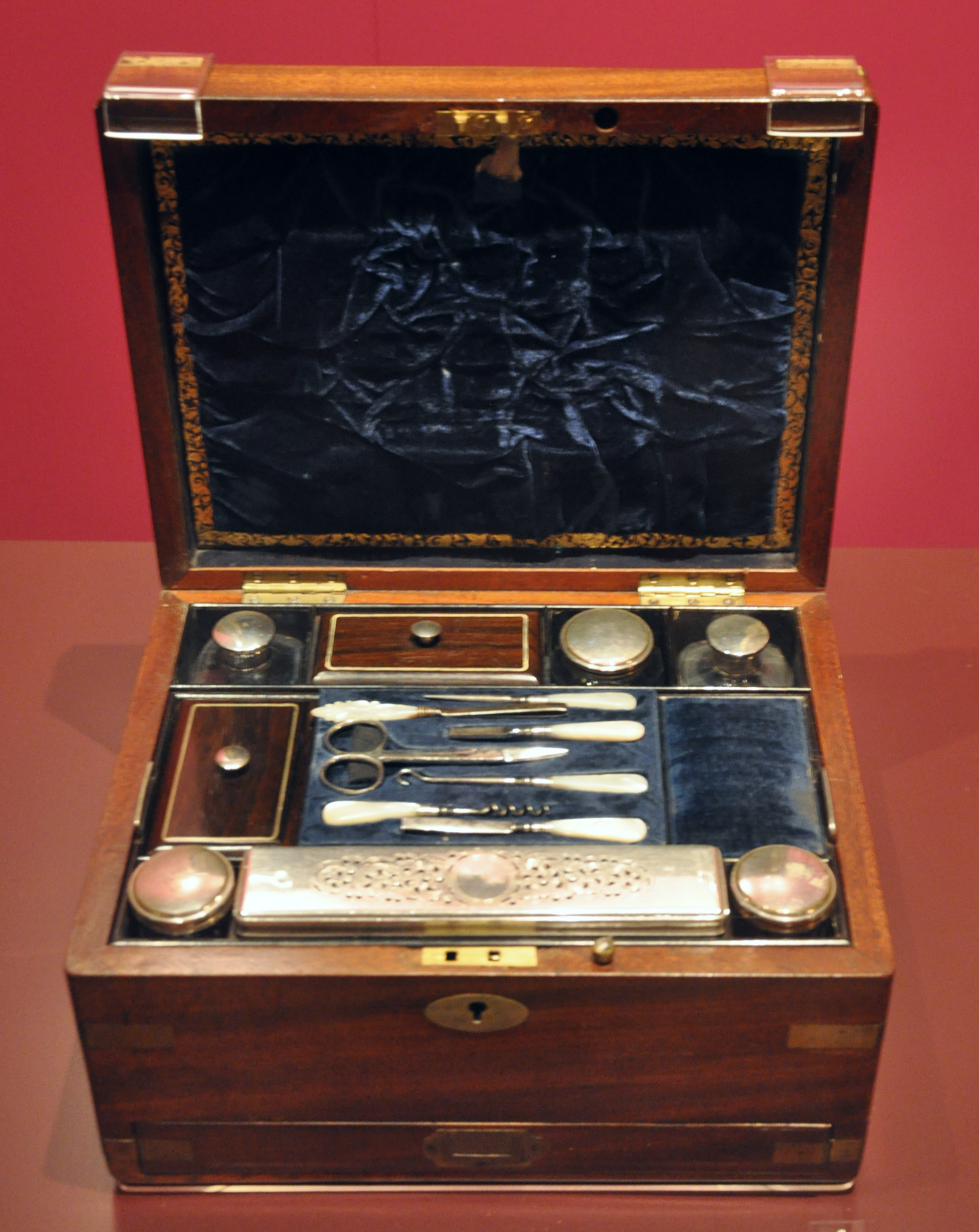
Harry Randall's make-up case, now in the Victoria and Albert Museum

In 1913, after the death of his wife Annie, he retired. Randall published an autobiography, Harry Randall – Old Time Comedian, in 1930. He died in a nursing home in Hendon, North London in 1932, and was buried in Hampstead Cemetery. The obituarist from the Hull Daily Mail opined that he was "one of the greatest music hall and pantomime comedians of his time."
