= Theatre Royal, Marylebone =

Coordinates: 51.5231°N 0.1704°W

Exterior view of the Royal West London Theatre shortly before its closure in 1945

The Theatre Royal, Marylebone (also known as the Marylebone Theatre, among other names) was a Victorian era theatre in the Marylebone area of London. Built in 1831, at various other times it was a music hall, a cinema and warehouse until it was damaged by fire in 1962, when it was demolished.

== Early history ==
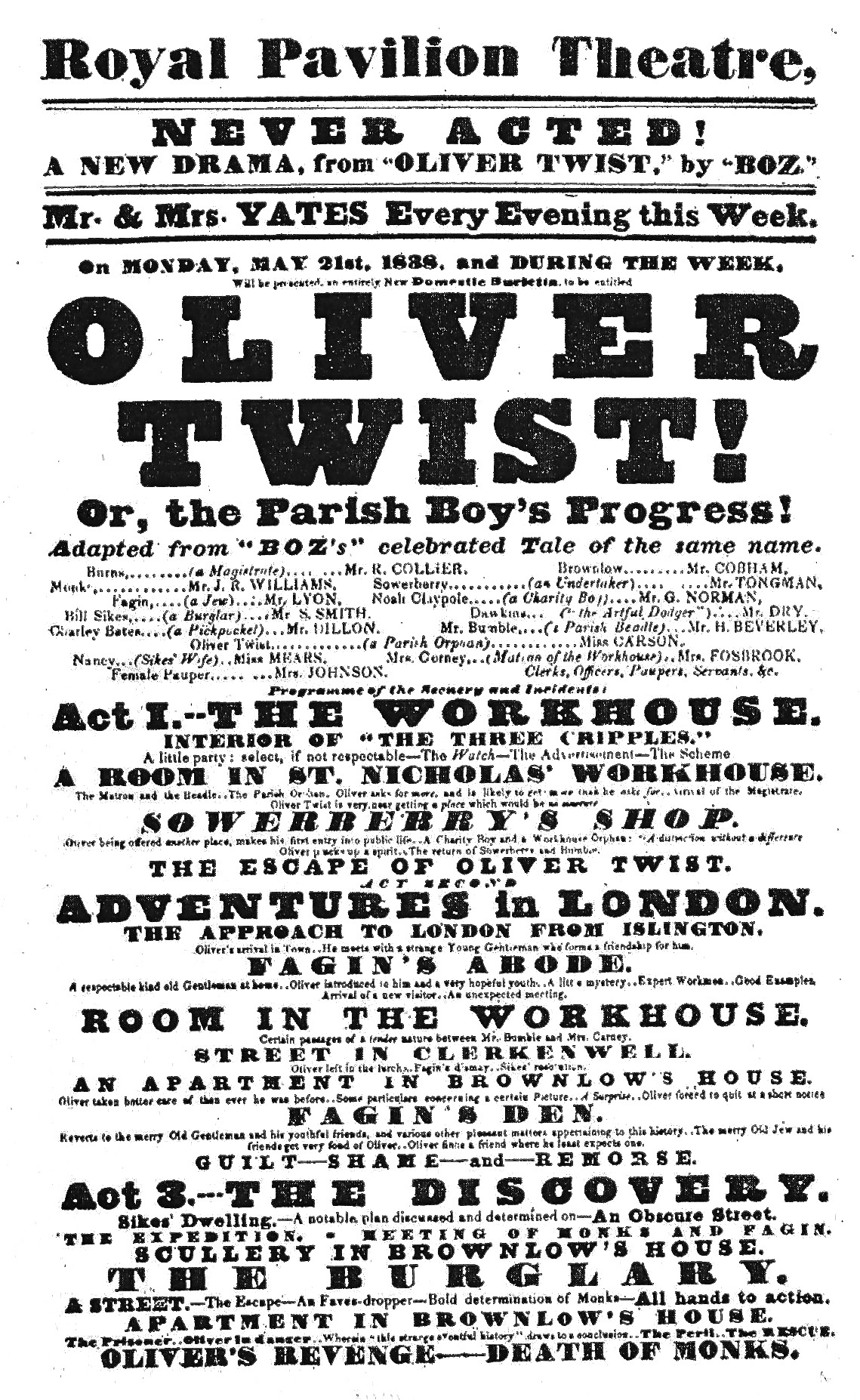
The earliest known playbill of a production of Oliver Twist - Royal Pavilion Theatre (1838)

Over the course of its history the theatre had many names and many owners. Located on Church Street in Marylebone, it opened in 1831 as the Royal Sussex Theatre. Built at a cost of about £9,000 by Messrs Ward, Eggerton, and Abbott, the theatre's foundation stone was laid on 17 May 1831 but by the following year it was refused a performing licence as being 'unfinished'. Despite this setback it reopened in 1832 as the unlicensed Royal Pavilion Theatre for performances of 'crude melodrama and comic songs'. In 1833 the still unfinished theatre was renamed the Portman Theatre but following its owner's bankruptcy it was put up for auction in July 1833. In its early years the theatre was a cheap venue or "penny gaffe" for the working classes which put on crude melodramas while in 1835 it was raided by the police and was under threat of closure by the local magistrates. The Portman Theatre was renovated and improved in 1837 following which it was renamed as the Marylebone Theatre.

== Royal Marylebone Theatre ==
On 13 November 1837, the theatre officially opened as the Royal Marylebone Theatre, under the management of Arthur Walker Hyde, the first of proprietor John Loveridge's many tenants. Hyde was a disciplinarian. A printed list of Rules and Regulations, 26 in all, with accompanying fines if disregarded, was posted in the theatre.

Charles Zachary Barnett's early Dickens adaptation, the three-act burletta Oliver Twist; or, The Parish Boy's Progress, opened at the theatre on 21 May 1838. It was only the second stage production of the work: Dickens had not yet completed the novel. Hyde left the Royal Marylebone Theatre on 1 September 1838.

== Theatre Royal, Marylebone ==
The theatre was relaunched under the management of John Douglass as the Theatre Royal, Marylebone with a production of the drama The Saxon Maid; or The Days of William the Conqueror, followed by the farce Tea With My Aunt and finishing the evening with Passion And Repentance. Later performances included Shakespeare's Richard III and The Cricket on the Hearth by Charles Dickens, who at the time was living nearby in Tavistock House in Devonshire Terrace. Under Douglass the theatre could seat about 2,500 patrons and was quite successful. He put on melodramas and pantomimes until he retired in 1847.

== Marylebone Theatre ==
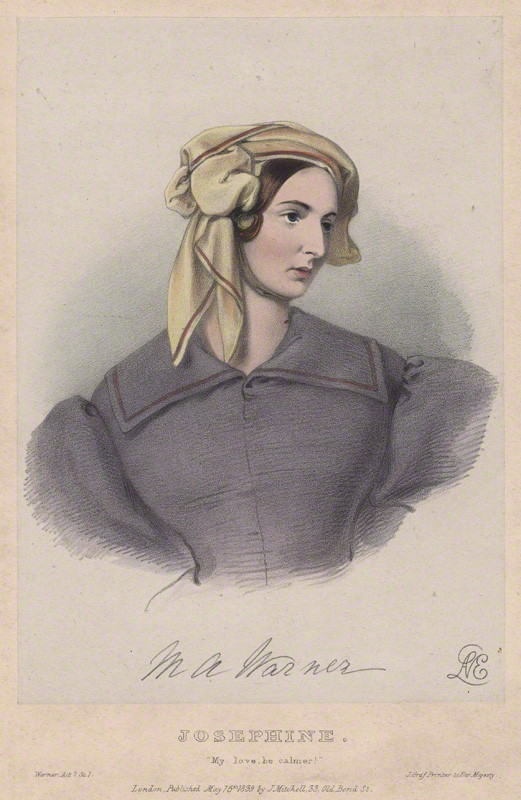
Mary Amelia Warner, in character as Josephine in Werner; she briefly managed the theatre from 1847

In 1847 the actor-manager Mary Warner retired from the management of Sadler's Wells Theatre and took on that of the Marylebone Theatre where she tried to stage legitimate theatre, opening on 30 September 1847 with The Winter's Tale with Warner herself playing Hermione. She took on parts such as Julia in The Hunchback (Knowles), Lady Teazle, and Lady Townley in The Provoked Husband (John Vanburgh and Colley Cibber) for which her years began to disqualify her. She revived in November The Scornful Lady, adapted by Serle, playing in it the Lady; and in 1848 Lucille and The Double Marriage, the latter again in Serle's adaptation. In 1847 Martha Cranmer Oliver made her London début at the Theatre Royal, which was the same year the actress Sarah West made her last appearance at the theatre before retiring. Warner's period of management at the Marylebone Theatre was not a success and she was succeeded by Edward Tyrrel Smith (1850–1852), and J. W. Wallack (1853–1857) in joint management with William Shaftoe Robertson, the father of Madge Kendal. They similarly failed to make the Marylebone a success.

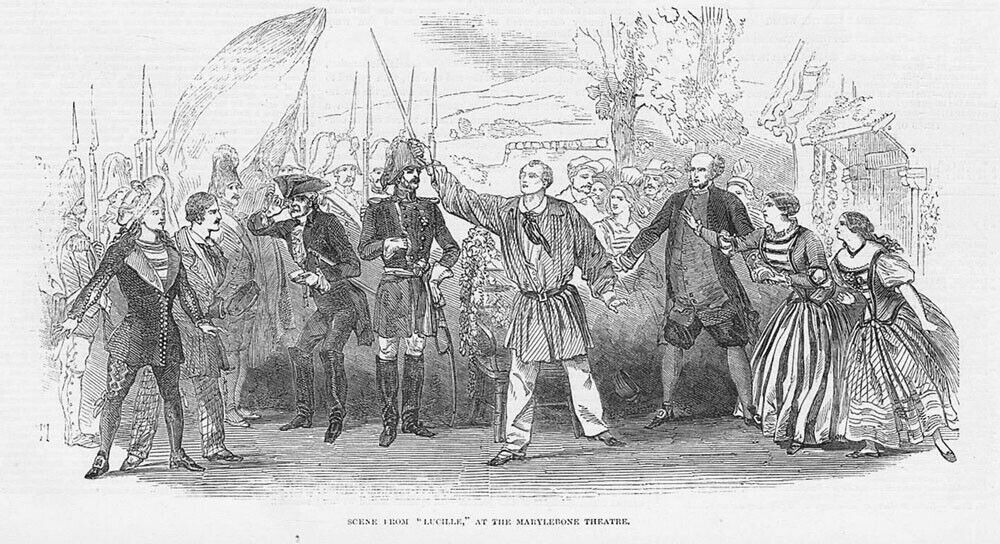
Performance of Lucille at the Marylebone Theatre (1848)

In 1854, during her father William Robertson's joint-management of the theatre, the 6 year-old Madge Kendal made her stage debut as Marie in the drama The Struggle for Gold and the Orphan of the Frozen Sea by Edward Stirling which had a scene of a Danish vessel breaking up on sea ice.

In 1857 the actor Samuel Anderson Emery was briefly the manager, being succeeded in 1858 by Joseph Arnold Cave, who had performed there as a boy; while he remained for some years he was no more successful than his predecessors. In 1862 the musician Arthur Lloyd appeared at the theatre.

In 1864 the theatre was rebuilt and enlarged while in 1868 under the management of Amy Sedgwick it was renamed the Royal Alfred Theatre in honour of Alfred, Duke of Edinburgh. In 1869 Sedgwick directed herself in the play Pindee Singh, the Pearl of Oude by C. H. Stephenson but unfortunately the play was not a success. By 1873 the theatre was once again known as the Marylebone Theatre when it began staging melodramas once again.

== West London Theatre of Varieties ==
From Easter 1871 to Easter 1872 actor Charles Harcourt was lessee of the theatre. Over the years the theatre put on pantomimes and melodramas, to suit the taste for such entertainments at that time, when it became known as "the home of East London theatre in the West". By December 1892 when vaudeville became popular the Theatre Royal underwent renovation and began operating as the West London Theatre of Varieties in order to take financial advantage of the then fashion for music hall. The theatre reopened in April 1893 with a performance lasting about five hours and which included Charles Coborn in the drama Brought to Bay; a racing piece called Terry; or, True to his Trust; The Clue performed by the Collinson combination, and a 'Negro Farce' performed by Rice, Melrose, Davis, and Co. The Era wrote of the evening:- "Comedians in galore were there. Ryland and Golden and R. G. Knowles excelled in American wit, while the Brothers Griffiths, the Brothers Poluski, Gus Elen, Pat Rafferty, and Edgar Granville represented some of the many phases of English and Irish humour. Among the ladies Miss Kate James, soubrette; Miss Nellie Navette, danseuse; Miss Ethel Buchanan and Miss Clara Bell, ballad singers, were particular favourites, and the volunteers for the stage on Saturday night also included Arthur Thomas, Sisters Palmer, Jessie Wild, Medley, Jesmond Dene, Charles Vincent, the Tortajados troupe, Jessie Prince, Dora Fielding, Harry Walton, Rosie Sylvester, Sisters Idris, Norris and Delmont, Daisy De Roy, Arthur Stevens, Mark Antony, Aubyn and Allen, Daisy May, Mr Melville, and Jessie Wynn.'

== Final years ==
In 1895 the theatre underwent another name change when it reverted to being the Royal West London Theatre where it continued to show variety acts until 1910, when it converted to a cinema. In 1932 it became the West London Cinema, being owned by the New Biograph Trading Company and known as the 'Bug Hole' by locals. In 1941 during World War II the building was damaged by bombs and the cinema finally closed in 1945 after which the building was used as a warehouse. The building burned down in 1962 and was demolished.

A parade of shops with flats above stands on the site today with a plaque marking the former connection with the theatre.
