= Henri-Joseph Dugué de La Fauconnerie =

French politician (1835-1914)

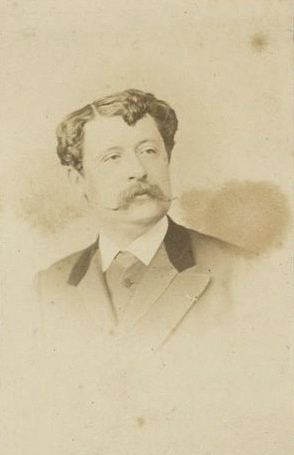
- Born: May 11, 1835; Paris, France
- Died: August 26, 1914 (aged 79); Saint-Germain-des-Grois, Orne, France
- Occupation: Politician

Henri-Joseph Dugué de La Fauconnerie (1835-1914) was a French politician. He served as a member of the Corps législatif from 1869 to 1870, and as a member of the Chamber of Deputies from 1876 to 1881, and from 1885 to 1893, representing Orne.

== Publications ==
- 1859: Le Tribunal de la Rote
- 1861: La Bretagne et l'empire
- 1885: Notre pauvre Argent !
- 1912: Souvenirs d'un vieil homme: (1866–1879)

== Sources ==
- "Henri-Joseph Dugué de La Fauconnerie", in Adolphe Robert and Gaston Cougny, Dictionnaire des parlementaires français (1789-1891), Bourloton, Paris, 1889 Edition details Wikisource
