= Tom Costello (music hall) =

Music hall performer (1863–1943)

Tom Costello (born Thomas Costellow; 30 April 1863 – 8 November 1943) was a music hall comedian and singer.

His birthplace is variously given as Birmingham or Ireland. He worked as an engraver before making his first stage appearance in Wolverhampton in 1883, and later the same year started performing in music halls in Bedford and south London. One of his earliest successes was in performing William J. Scanlan's song "My Nellie's Blue Eyes", which was soon parodied by Charles Coborn as "Two Lovely Black Eyes". Costello performed in pantomimes, but increasingly specialised in black humour, such as "At Trinity Church I Met My Doom" and "His Funeral's Tomorrow", and sentimental and patriotic ballads such as the stirring "Comrades", a story of friendship between two old soldiers written by Felix McGlennon, which became Costello's signature song.

He continued to have a lengthy career in pantomime, and in the 1920s toured with his own variety company. He recorded a medley of his most famous songs in 1933. He died, aged 80, in London in 1943 and was buried in Streatham Park Cemetery.
