= Allen Raine =

Welsh novelist (1836–1908)

Anne Adalisa Beynon Puddicombe
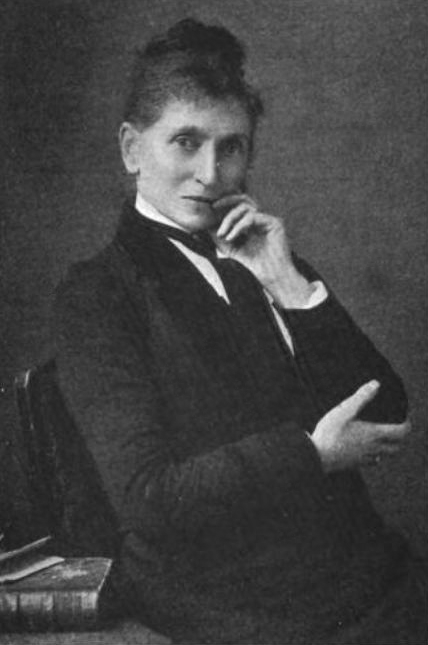
- In The Bookman, April 1908
- Born: Anne Adalisa Evans; 6 October 1836; Newcastle Emlyn, Wales
- Died: 21 June 1908 (aged 71); Tresaith, Wales
- Resting place: Penbryn, Ceredigion
- Spouse: Beynon Puddicombe
- Writing career
- Language: English, Welsh
- Genre: Novel

Allen Raine was the pseudonym of the Welsh novelist Anne Adalisa Beynon Puddicombe (6 October 1836 – 21 June 1908), who was born in Newcastle Emlyn. Her novels had sold more than two million copies by 1912.

== Life ==
She was born Anne Adalisa Evans in Newcastle Emlyn, Carmarthenshire, the eldest daughter of a lawyer, Benjamin Evans, and Letitia Grace Evans, his wife, whose father was a lawyer and the grandson of David Davis (1745–1827). Allen Raine's mother was also the granddaughter of Daniel Rowland.

In 1849, she was sent to be educated with the family of a Unitarian minister, Henry Solly, at Cheltenham. Family friends included literati such as George Eliot, Mrs Henry Wood, and Bulwer-Lytton. She later lived in the suburbs of London with her sister Lettie. In her youth she contributed to a short-lived periodical called Home Sunshine, which was produced by friends, the Leslie family, and printed at Newcastle Emlyn.

=== Marital life ===
Returning to Wales in 1856, she married the minor artist and banker Beynon Puddicombe at Penbryn Church, Tresaith, Cardiganshire, on 10 April 1872. He was the foreign correspondent of Smith Payne's Bank, London. They lived in the London area until February 1900, when her husband became mentally ill. They then retired to Bronmôr, their summer house in Tresaith until his death in 1906. He died on 29 May and was buried at Penbryn Church.

She remained in Tresaith until her death from breast cancer on 21 June 1908. Cranogwen and Owen Rhoscomyl counted among the many public tributes paid to Allen Raine at the time of her funeral.

== Works ==
A fictionalised version of coastal Cardiganshire features largely in each of her novels and the majority of her short stories.

In 1897, she published a literary translation of Ceiriog's long poem 'Alun Mabon' in serial form in O. M. Edwards's magazine Wales.

- Ynysoer (National Eisteddfod winner, 1894)
- A Welsh Singer (1896) - Raine also adapted this novel as a play with the same title.
- Torn Sails (1897)
- By Berwen Banks (1899)
- Garthowen (1900) Garthowen, Storia di una famiglia del Galles (First Italian Edition) traduzione e cura di Piero Bocci, Independently Published, Amazon, 2026.
- A Welsh Witch (1902, republished by Honno Classics, 2013)
- On the Wings of the Wind (1903)
- Hearts of Wales (1905)
- Queen of the Rushes (1906, republished by Honno Classics, 1998)
- Neither Storehouse nor Barn (1908)
- All in a Month (short story collection; 1908)
- Where Billows Roll (originally Ynysoer, Eisteddfod winner 1894)
- Under the Thatch (unfinished at death, completed by Lyn Evans in 1910)

== Films ==
- Torn Sails (1915)
- A Welsh Singer (starring Florence Turner 1915) and By Berwen Banks (1920)
