= Jean (dog) =

Dog that performed in early silent films (1902-1916)

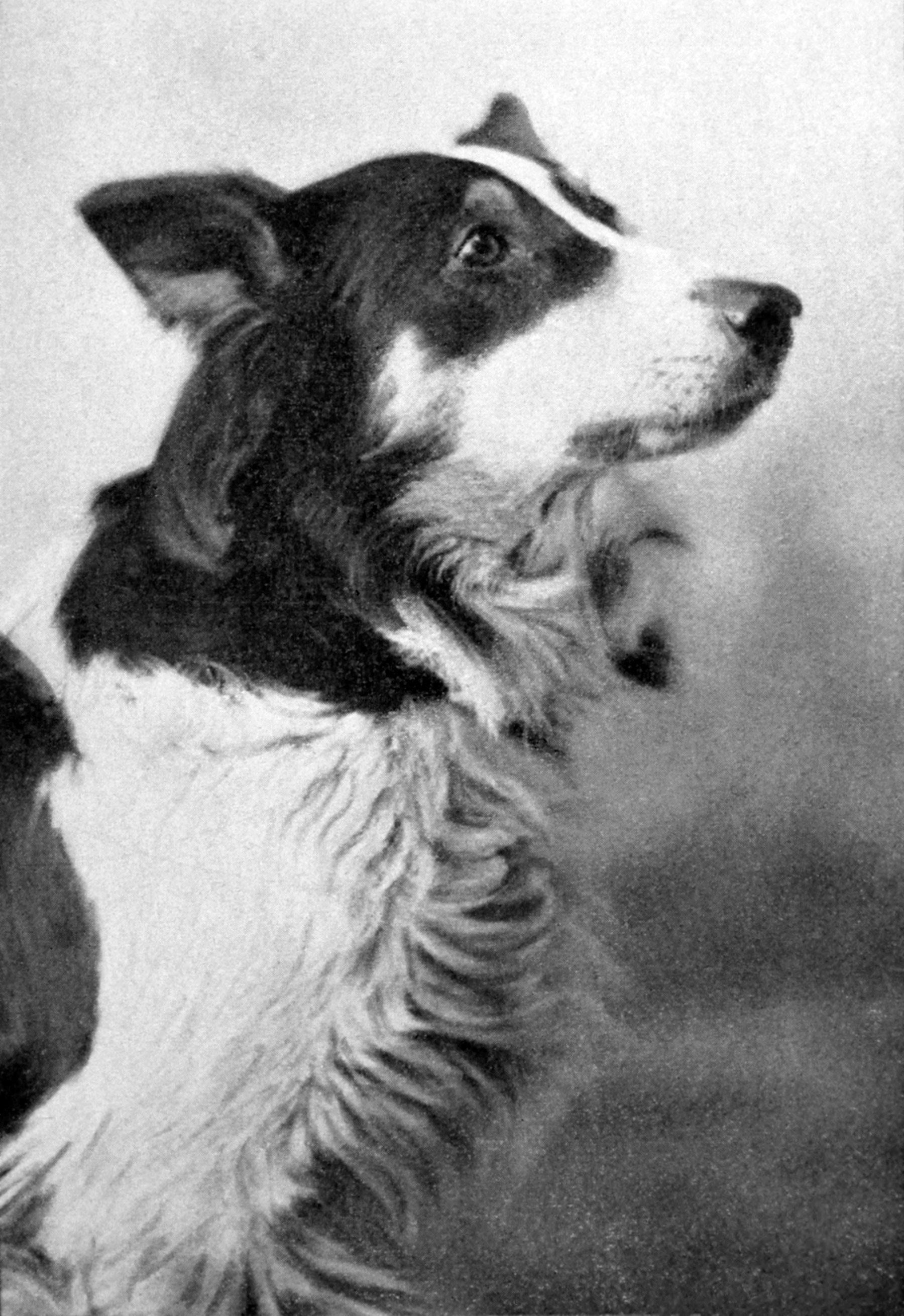
- The Motion Picture Story Magazine, 1911
- Other name: The Vitagraph Dog
- Species: Canis familiaris
- Breed: Scotch Collie
- Sex: Female
- Born: 1902; Eastport, Maine
- Died: 1916 (aged 14)
- Occupation: Dog actor
- Employer: Vitagraph Studios
- Years active: 1909–1916
- Owner: Laurence Trimble

Jean, also known as the Vitagraph Dog (1902–1916), was a female collie that starred in silent films. Owned and guided by director Laurence Trimble, she was one of the first canines to have a leading role in motion pictures. Jean was with Vitagraph Studios from 1909, and in 1913 went with Trimble to England to work with Florence Turner in her own independent film company.

== Life and career ==
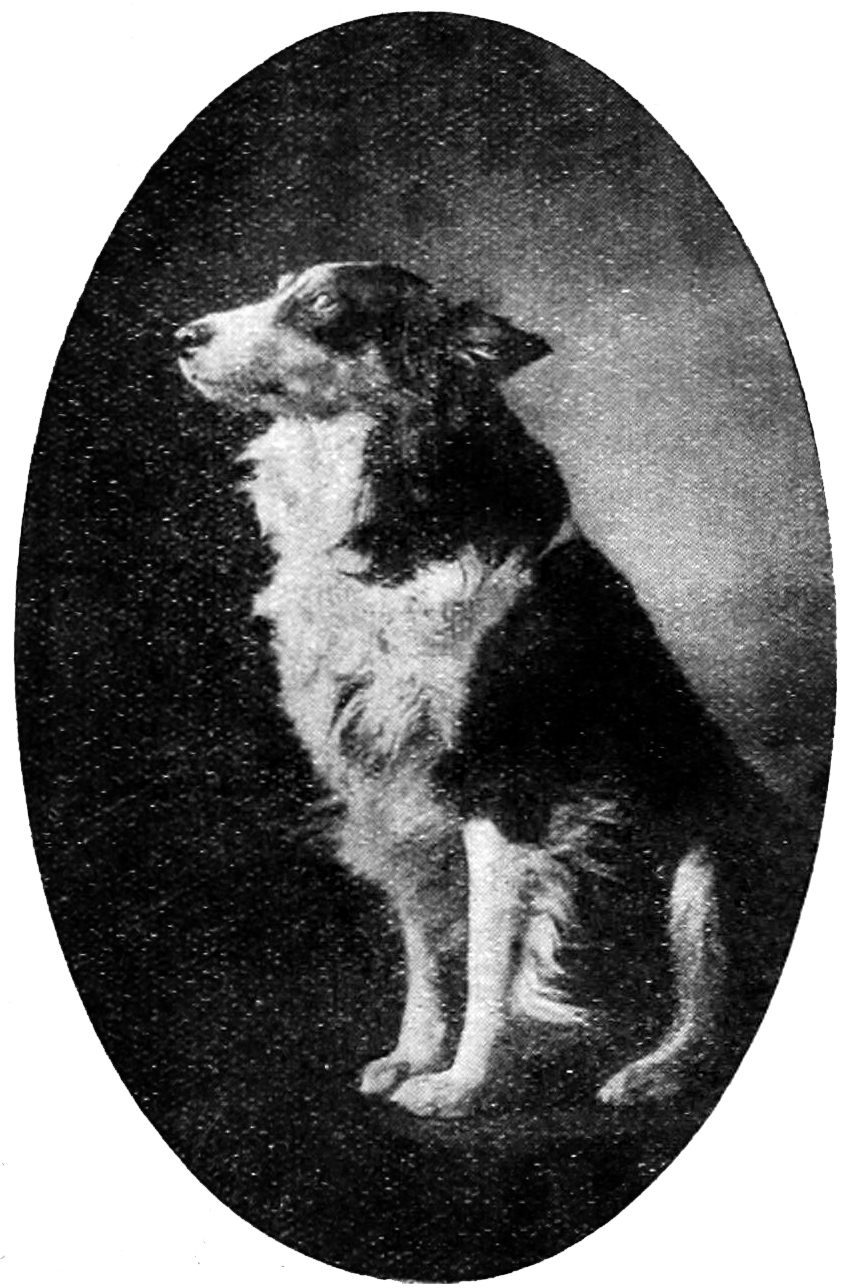
Jean in 1912

Around 1908, Maine resident and writer Laurence Trimble sold an animal story to a New York magazine. In 1909 Trimble visited Vitagraph Studios in New York while doing research for a series of articles called "How Movies Are Made". As he chatted with the sole assistant working under Rollin S. Sturgeon, head of the scenario department, he learned that a story of special interest to producer Albert E. Smith had been set aside because it required a dog that could act—not simply do tricks, but to behave naturally on command. The next morning Trimble returned with his dog, a tri-color Scotch Collie named Jean. "Jean, the Vitagraph Dog" became the first canine to have a leading role in motion pictures.

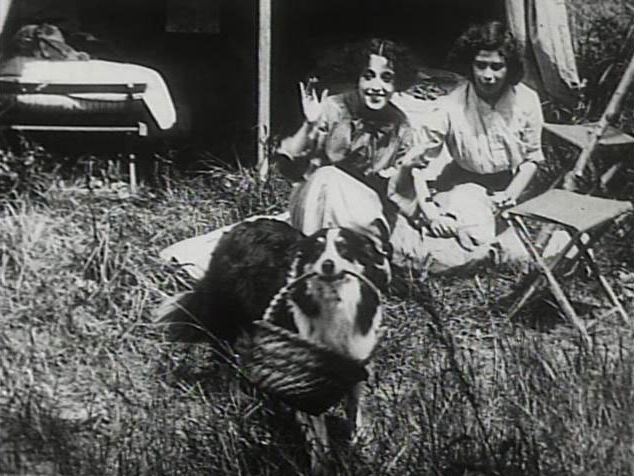
Jean, Florence Turner and Mary Fuller in Jean the Match-Maker (1910), a film that survives

PLAY Playmates (1912), another film featuring Jean; running time 13 minutes

"Jean was equal in popularity to Vitagraph's human stars, Florence Turner and Maurice Costello," wrote film historian Anthony Slide. Jean was soon starring in her own films, all directed by Trimble. One-reelers and two-reelers with titles such as Jean and the Calico Doll, Jean and the Waif and Jean Goes Fishing were made by Trimble as their troupe filmed along the coastline in his native Maine.

Trimble became a leading director at Vitagraph, directing most of the films made by Turner and John Bunny, as well as those made by Jean. Actress Helen Hayes recalled in a 1931 interview with The New York Times that as an eight-year-old she had roles in two of the 1910 films. "I had long curls and they let me play the juvenile lead in two pictures in support of Jean, the collie," Hayes said. "Jean was the most famous dog of the day and I was very thrilled."

In December 1912, Jean gave birth to six puppies—two male and four female—and was the subject of the Vitagraph documentary short film, Jean and Her Family (1913).

In March 1913, Trimble and Jean left Vitagraph and accompanied Florence Turner to England, where she formed her own company, Turner Films. Trimble and Jean returned to the United States in 1916. Jean died later that year, at age 14.

Trimble tried to launch the career of a successor, Shep the Vitagraph Dog, without success. He then discovered and worked with another dog star, the famed Strongheart.

The four films he made with Strongheart won Trimble a special place in film history, but in later years he would say that, in the qualities of spirit and intelligence, Jean was the best of all his dogs. Trimble eventually retired from filmmaking and trained animals exclusively. His special interest was training guide dogs for the blind.

== Films ==
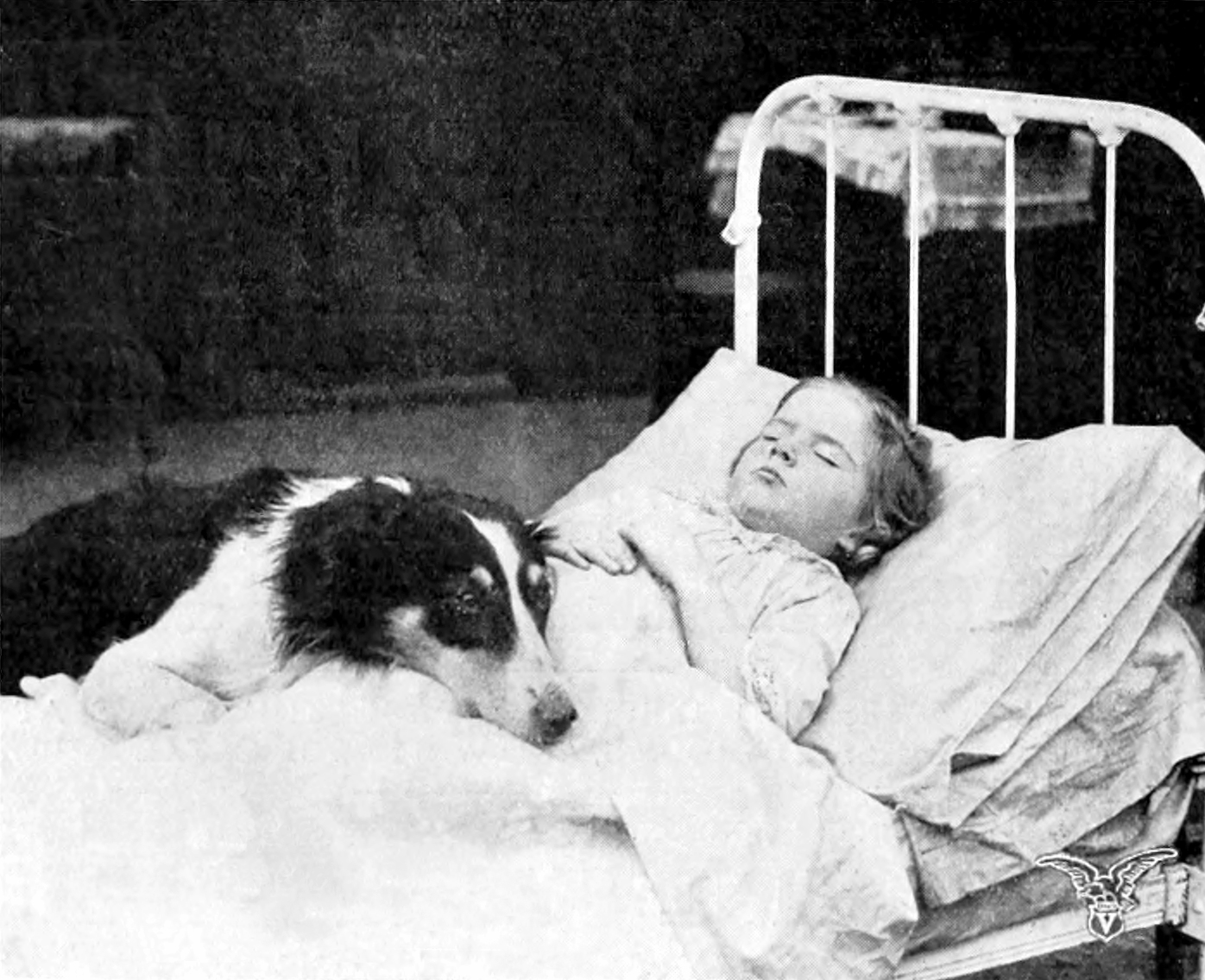
Jean and Florence Foley in Playmates (1912)

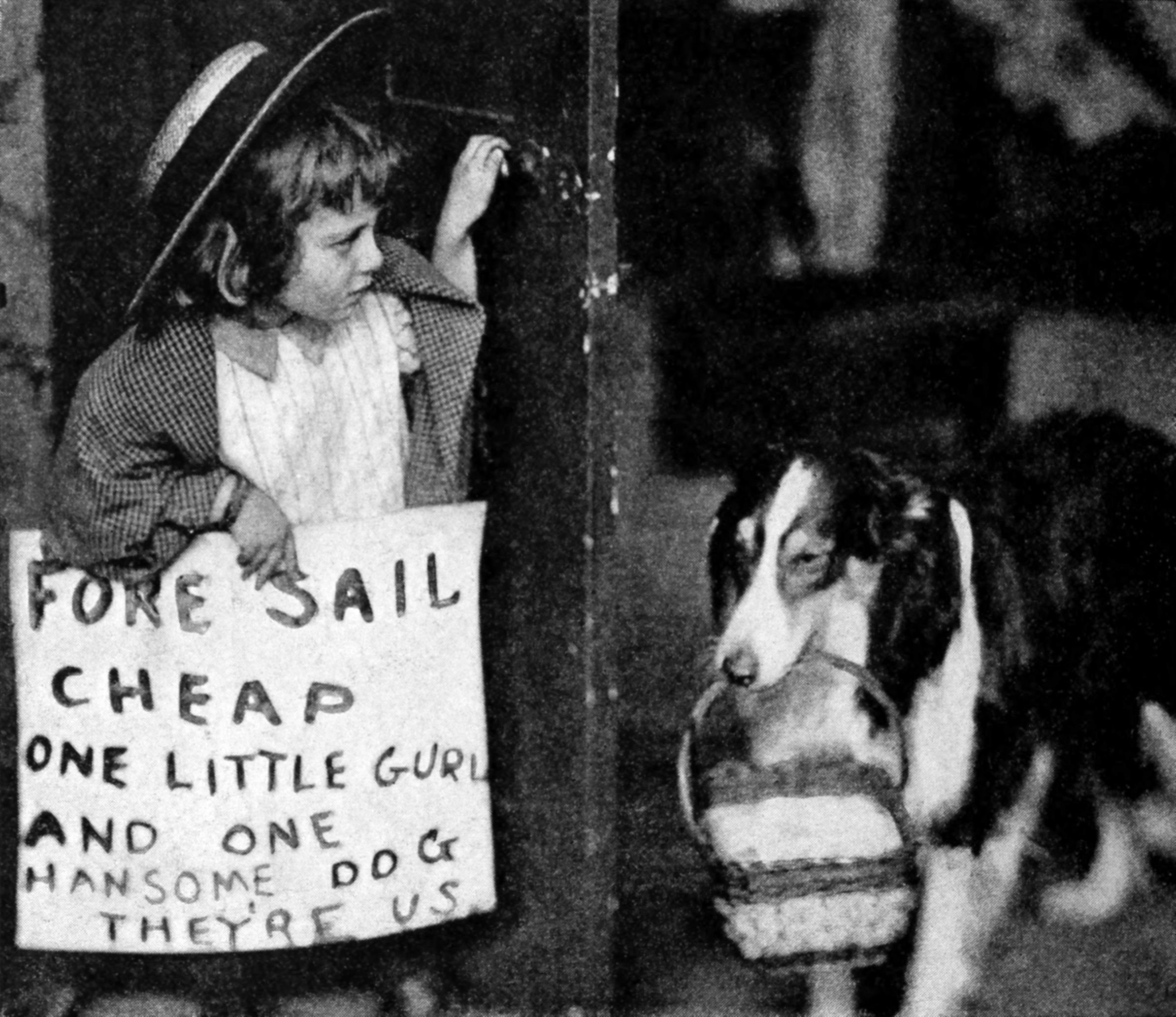
Helene Costello and Jean in The Church Across the Way (1912)

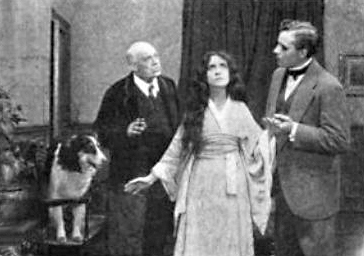
Jean and Florence Turner in Jean's Evidence (1913)

Jean's films are lost films, with the exception of Jean the Match-Maker (1910), Jean Rescues (1911), in paper print at the Library of Congress, and Playmates (1912).

Year	Title	Role	Notes
1910	Jean and the Calico Doll	Jean	Short film Film debut of Helen Hayes
1910	Jean the Match-Maker	Jean	Short film
1910	Jean Goes Foraging	Jean	Short film
1910	Jean Goes Fishing	Jean	Short film
1910	A Tin-Type Romance		Short film
1910	Jean and the Waif	Jean	Short film
1910	Where the Winds Blow		Short film
1910	Her Mother's Wedding Gown		Short film
1911	Jean Rescues	Jean	Short film
1911	When the Light Waned		Short film
1911	The Stumbling Block		Short film
1911	Tested by the Flag		Short film
1911	Auld Lang Syne	Geordie's dog	Short film
1912	Jean Intervenes	Billy's dog	Short film
1912	Playmates		Short film
1912	The Church Across the Way	Jean	Short film
1912	Bachelor Buttons		Short film
1912	The Signal of Distress	Jean	Short film
1913	Jean and Her Family	Herself	Documentary short film
1913	Jean's Evidence	Madge's dog	Short film, second release of Turner Films
1914	'Fraid Cat	Jeanne, Jim's Dog	Short film
1914	The Shepherd Lassie of Argyle		
1914	Through the Valley of Shadows		
1915	Lost and Won		
1915	Far from the Madding Crowd	Gabriel's Dog	

== See also ==
- List of individual dogs
