= Indian Romeo and Juliet =

- Directed by: Laurence Trimble
- Written by: Hal Reid (scenario)
- Based on: Romeo and Juliet by William Shakespeare
- Starring: Florence Turner; Wallace Reid
- Production company: Vitagraph Studios
- Distributed by: General Film Company
- Release date: January 30, 1912
- Running time: 1 reel (1,010 feet)
- Country: United States
- Language: Silent (English intertitles)

Indian Romeo and Juliet is a 1912 American drama film directed by Laurence Trimble and starring Florence Turner and Wallace Reid. The story is an adaptation of Romeo and Juliet by William Shakespeare set in Mohawk and Huron tribes.

== Cast ==
- Florence Turner as Ethona (Juliet)
- Wallace Reid as Oniatare (Romeo)
- Harry T. Morey as Kowa (Count Paris) (credited as Harry Morrey)
- Hal Reid as Rakowaneh (Capulet) (credited as James H. Reid)
- Mrs. Adelaide Ober as Neok (the Nurse)
- Harold Wilson as Oyenkwa (Friar Laurence)

== Reception ==
A critic for Moving Picture World wrote, "It will be a good feature picture although the story is not very vital. The photographs are beautiful." A critic for The Cinema described it as "quite out of the ordinary, considering that it has strong romantic and poetic tendencies. It is an attempt to translate poetry into cinematography. Both the acting and the magnificent natural setting convey to the observer a vivid picture of the romance of the red man." They concluded that it is "altogether a remarkable film and a distinct improvement on previous Indian drama."
