= Jean Rescues =

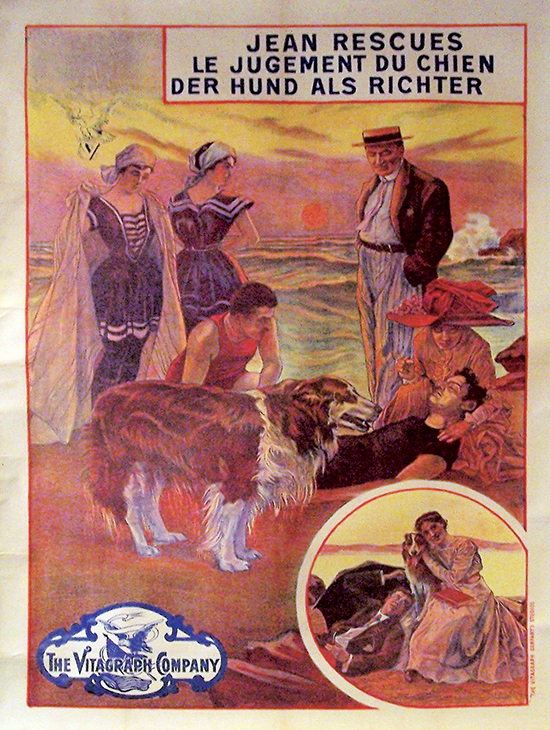
- Theatrical release poster
- Directed by: Laurence Trimble
- Produced by: Vitagraph Company of America
- Starring: Florence Turner; Jean; Leo Delaney
- Distributed by: General Film Company
- Release date: January 31, 1911
- Running time: 1 reel
- Country: United States
- Language: Silent..English titles

Jean Rescues is a 1911 American silent short film directed by Laurence Trimble, starring Florence Turner and Trimble's dog Jean. It was produced by the Vitagraph Company of America and distributed through the General Film Company. This film survives in 35mm in the Library of Congress.

== Cast ==
- Florence Turner — Alice
- Leo Delaney — Horace
- William J. Humphrey — Oscar
- Jean — Jean, a dog
