= Lost and Won =

Lost and Won may refer to:

- Lost and Won (1915 film), a 1915 British film
- Lost and Won (1917 film), a 1917 American film
