= A Welsh Singer =

1915 British silent drama film

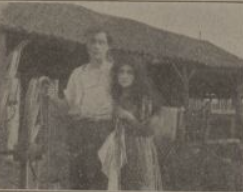
- Promotional image for the film, printed in a contemporary advertisement.
- Directed by: Henry Edwards
- Written by: Henry Edwards: Laurence Trimble
- Starring: Henry Edwards: Florence Turner
- Production company: Turner Film Company
- Release date: 1915
- Country: United Kingdom
- Languages: Silent; English intertitles

A Welsh Singer (1915) is a lost British silent romantic film based on a novel of the same name. Produced by Florence Turner's Turner Film Company, it is a romance between two lovers from rural Wales who move to London and become artists. Among the company's most popular films, it was praised by British newspapers but received a mixed review in an American magazine. Turner starred as the female lead, while the male lead Henry Edwards also served as its director, marking his directorial debut.

== Plot ==
The Welsh shepherd Ieuan and his lover, the shepherdess Milfawny, separately move from rural Wales to London. Milfawny gains fame as a singer, while Ieuan becomes a noted sculptor. Ieuan falls in love with Milfawny again while in London, unaware of her identity. Upon the two's return to Wales, they begin a romantic relationship.

== Production and marketing ==
A Welsh Singer is a lost silent feature film was made in the United Kingdom by the American actress Florence Turner's Turner Film Company. Like many films set in Wales during the 1910s, it was a romance produced by an English studio. It was based on the popular novel A Welsh Singer by Allen Raine, one of three films based on her work. The film was the first directed by English actor Henry Edwards, who also appeared as the male lead Leuan. The script was written by Edwards and American director Laurence Trimble. Turner served as the main female lead, Mifawny. Edwards and Turner had appeared together as co-stars in Trimble's own film earlier in 1915, Lost and Won. Other actors included Campbell Gullan, Malcolm Cherry, Una Venning and Fred Rains. Edith Evans, who mainly acted in theatre, made her first of two silent film appearances; after these, she would not appear in a film again until acting in The Last Days on Dolwyn in 1948.

The film was released in 1915. It was five reels long, with a total reel length of 4,600 ft (1,400 m). An advertisement aimed at cinema owners in a trade magazine, The Bioscope, encouraged them to "Book this all-British film. It will not let you down. Never before has a film been produced with such artistic feeling and so cleverly acted." Various local newspapers in the United Kingdom ran advertisements for the film; those with closer links to Wales often put emphasis on the film's Welsh setting.

== Reaction ==
A Welsh Singer was among the most popular films produced by Turner. A review in Grimsby News praised the depiction of rural Wales and a scene featuring a fire and rescue from a crowded concert hall. A Birkenhead News review also praised the production, naming it a "picture of outstanding merit". An article in the Welsh paper Porthcawl News noted that the film "should appeal to all Welsh folk, and is worthy of a visit." The American trade magazine, Variety, gave a less enthusiastic review of the film. It praised the quality of Turner's acting and said the film was better than a previous film she had appeared in. However, it described a scene where a character did not recognise his former love interest as "unconvincing". The review concluded that there was "no doubt" that the film would be "acceptable" for cinemas.
