= A Welsh Singer (novel) =

1896 novel by Anne Puddicombe

A Welsh Singer is a novel written by Anne Puddicombe in 1896. It was later adapted into a silent drama film in 1915.

== Background ==
Anne Adalisa Puddicombe, also known as Allen Raine, was a romantic novelist from Newcastle Emlyn, Ceredigion. At thirteen years of age she and her sister were sent to Cheltenham and Wandsworth, where they were educated by the family of Henry Solly, a Unitarian minister and radical activist. At the National Eisteddfod of 1894 she won a prize for her story about Welsh country life. Encouraged by this, she finished her first novel Mifanwy in 1896. Puddicombe’s work was rejected by six publishers, after which she decided to change the title to A Welsh Singer under the pen name 'Allen Raine’, which then was successfully published. Puddicombe, assuming the name Allen Raine, soon became one of Wales’s most popular novelists. All of her publications focused on the life of locals in small Welsh villages and towns.

Raine personally adapted the novel for the stage. After her death, tt was adapted into a film starring Henry Edwards and Florence Turner in 1915.
