= Jean and the Calico Doll =

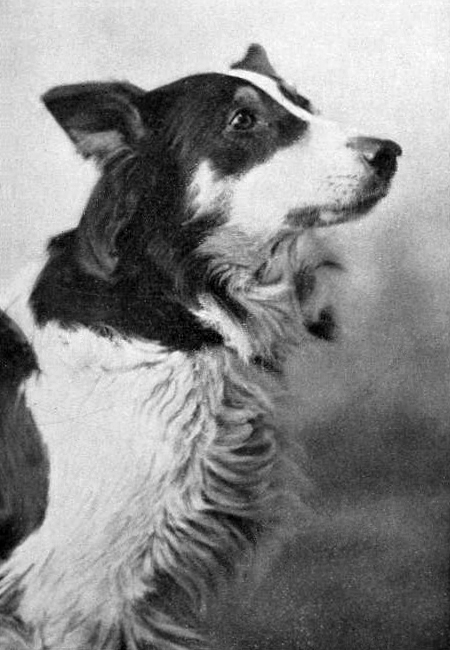
- Jean, the Vitagraph Dog
- Directed by: Laurence Trimble
- Produced by: Vitagraph Company of America
- Starring: Jean; Helen Hayes; Maurice Costello; Florence Turner
- Distributed by: General Film Company
- Release date: August 30, 1910
- Running time: 970 feet (two reels)
- Country: United States
- Language: Silent with English titles

Jean and the Calico Doll is a 1910 short film directed by Laurence Trimble for Vitagraph Studios. It is the first film starring his own dog Jean, a female tri-color collie soon to be famous as the Vitagraph Dog. The drama marks the film debut of Helen Hayes, the first of two films she made with the famous dog in 1910.

== Plot ==
At his home, Mr. Doyle meets with a visitor and is paid a large sum of money, in cash. Doyle's children are there during their discussion—his son sitting at the window, and his young daughter playing on the floor with her collie, Jean. The cash is left on the table while Doyle sees his visitor out. The son leaves the room, and the young girl sees the money and thinks of it only as paper she can play with. She takes the bundle out into the garden, puts it into a cradle with her calico doll, and cuts paper dolls from one or two of the bills.

The room is empty when Doyle returns, and he is alarmed to find the money missing. When his wife tells him she knows nothing about it, he accuses his son of stealing it. Deeply offended, the son leaves home. He has been gone only a short time when the young daughter comes inside to show her mother the paper dolls she has made from the pretty paper. Jean the collie follows along with a bundle of money the child has dropped. Her mother calls to her husband, and the little girl explains that she thought the paper was just something she could play with, and she is deeply upset that her brother has gone away.

The child sets out with her calico doll to find her brother, with Jean close behind her. Wandering in the woods and fields, the child falls down a steep embankment, injures her ankle and lies unconscious. Unable to rouse the child, Jean runs home to alert the parents but is unable to make them understand. Jean goes back and retrieves the calico doll as proof that the child is missing and in danger.

Brought back home out of devotion to his sister, the son returns to his distraught parents. When he sees Jean with the calico doll, he follows the dog to the scene of the accident and rescues the little girl.

== Production ==
Laurence Trimble joined Vitagraph Studios in early 1910 and became one of Vitagraph's leading directors. As well as directing many of the films starring Florence Turner and John Bunny, Trimble was responsible for all of the films starring his dog Jean, the first canine to have a leading role in motion pictures. Jean and the Calico Doll was the first in a series of pictures that put her in the ranks of Vitagraph's top stars.

Jean and the Calico Doll features the first screen performance of actress Helen Hayes, who remembered making two films with Jean that year. "I had long curls and they let me play the juvenile lead in two pictures in support of Jean, the collie," Hayes recalled in 1931. "Jean was the most famous dog of the day and I was very thrilled."

In her 1968 memoir, On Reflection, Hayes wrote that Frederick A. Thomson, her director when she appeared with the Columbia Players in Washington, D.C., persuaded her mother to let her perform in a film for Vitagraph Studios, where he had begun working. The Brooklyn-based troupe traveled by ferry to Fort Lee, New Jersey, to film Jean and the Calico Doll. Maurice Costello and Florence Turner, who starred as the parents, "joined everyone else, including camera and prop-men, and sat on those long slatted benches drinking hot coffee at dawn. Nobody was very fancy in those days", Hayes remembered.

Making pictures was a lark and the most vagabond existence. We'd all get into a long line of automobiles with tripods, cameras, props, and lunches. Then we'd drive until we saw a lovely estate that might serve as a setting for the company. If the house and surrounding land seemed right, an official hand would wave the caravan to stop and out we'd jump, to steal the view as a background to our plot. We would hurriedly play a scene on the velvety lawn and in and out of the sycamore trees and hydrangea bushes, and then run before a window was opened and a threatening voice would send us packing. We always ran faster than the owners or their servants, who sometimes came out to chase us off their property. The audacity of us—it was marvelous!

== Reception ==
The Moving Picture World called the film "a dog story which has much interest, as all such stories do. The intelligence of animals makes a good picture at any time, and when it is utilized in rescuing life, as this one is, the interest is measurably increased. Apart from the virtual rescue of the injured child by the dog the film contains no striking characteristics. The misplaced money, the false accusation and the child wandering away to find her brother are all interesting features, but they are in reality but incidents upon which to base the intelligence of the dog."

== Preservation status ==
No print of Jean and the Calico Doll is known to exist.

== See also ==
- List of American films of 1910
