= Sally in Our Alley (1916 film) =

- Directed by: Laurence Trimble
- Written by: Benedict James
- Produced by: Florence Turner
- Starring: Hilda Trevelyan; Reginald Owen; Mary Dibley
- Production company: Florence Turner Productions
- Distributed by: Ideal Films
- Release date: 28 April 1916
- Running time: 50 minutes
- Country: United Kingdom
- Languages: Silent; English intertitles

Sally in Our Alley is a 1916 British silent drama film directed by Laurence Trimble and starring Hilda Trevelyan, Reginald Owen and Mary Dibley. It takes its name from the traditional British song.

== Cast ==
- Hilda Trevelyan as Sally
- Reginald Owen as Harry
- Mary Dibley as Belle Cavendish
- Edward O'Neill as Beauvais
- Wyndham Guise as Squire
- Fred Rains as Steward

== Bibliography ==
- Low, Rachael. The History of British Film (Volume 3): The History of the British Film 1914 - 1918. Routledge, 2013.
