= The Shepherd Lassie of Argyle =

- Directed by: Laurence Trimble
- Written by: Hector Dion
- Starring: Florence Turner; Rex Davis; Hector Dion
- Production company: Florence Turner Productions
- Distributed by: Kinematograph Trading Company
- Release date: October 1914
- Running time: 3 reels
- Country: United Kingdom
- Languages: Silent; English intertitles

The Shepherd Lassie of Argyle is a 1914 British silent drama film directed by Laurence Trimble and starring Florence Turner, Rex Davis and Hector Dion.

== Cast ==
- Florence Turner as Mary Lachan
- Rex Davis as Alan MacPherson
- Hector Dion as The MacPherson
- Clifford Pembroke as Lachlan
- Isobel Carma as Isobel
- Arnold Rayner as The Maniac

== Bibliography ==
- Low, Rachael. The History of the British Film 1914-1918. Routledge, 2005.
