= For Her People =

1914 British silent drama film

- Directed by: Laurence Trimble
- Written by: Laurence Trimble
- Produced by: Florence Turner
- Starring: Florence Turner; Rex Davis; Franklyn Bellamy
- Production company: Florence Turner Productions
- Distributed by: Walturdaw; Pathe Exchange (US)
- Release date: August 1914
- Country: United Kingdom
- Languages: Silent; English intertitles

For Her People is a 1914 British silent drama film directed by Laurence Trimble and starring Florence Turner, Rex Davis and Franklyn Bellamy.

== Cast ==
- Florence Turner as Joan
- Clifford Pembroke as Leslie Calder
- Rex Davis as Tom
- Franklyn Bellamy as Henry Calder
- Herbert Dunsey as William Arnold
- John MacAndrews as Greengrocer

== Bibliography ==
- Low, Rachael. The History of the British Film 1914-1918. Routledge, 2005.
