= Florence Foley =

American actress

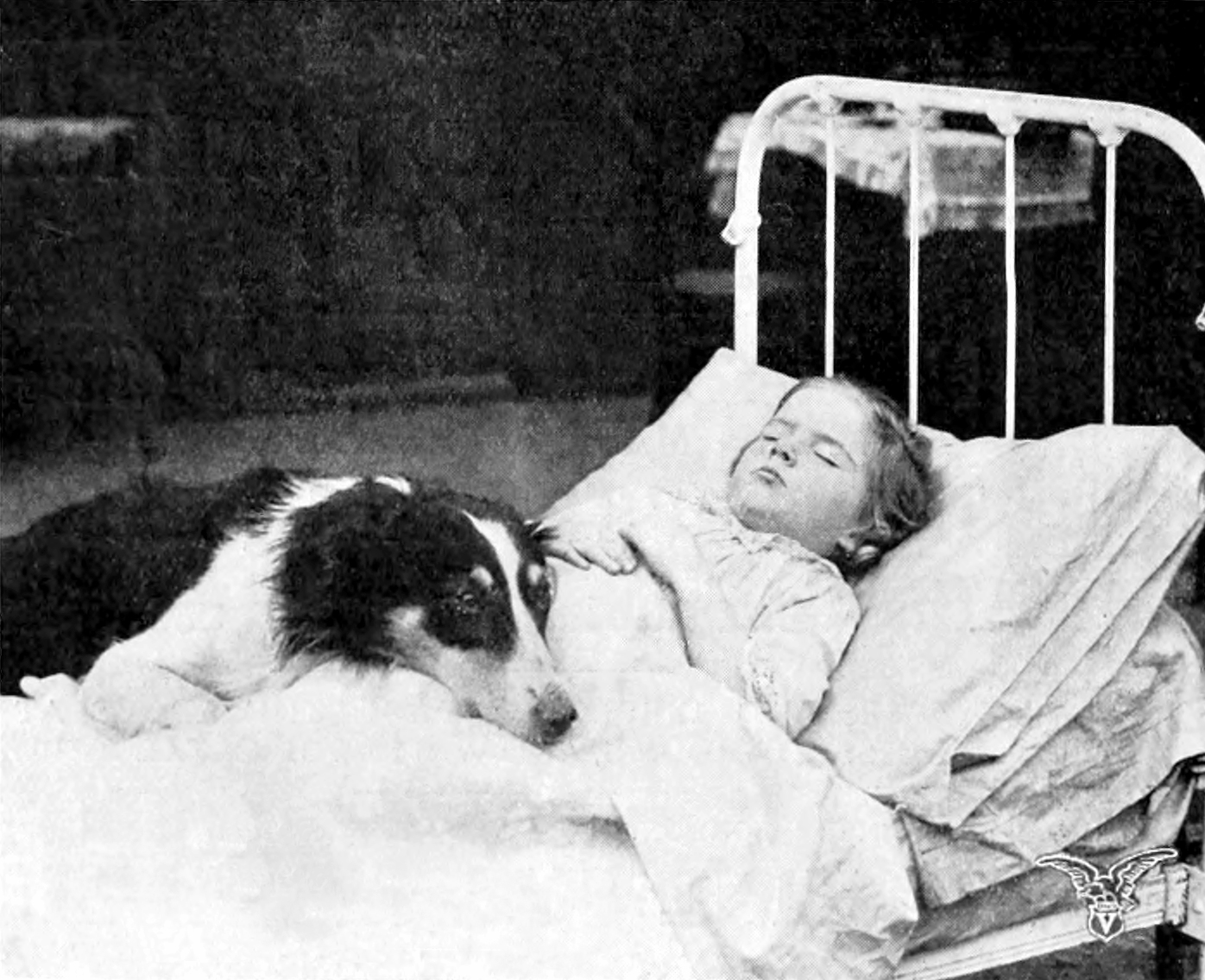
Florence Foley and Jean, the Vitagraph Dog, in Playmates (1912)

Florence Foley (born c. 1907), was an American child actress. She appeared in 15 films for Vitagraph Studios between 1911 and 1914.

In 1915 she appeared in Maude Adams's company for the production of three plays by J. M. Barrie at the Academy of Music in Richmond, Virginia.

In 1938 she played the role of Annabella in Little Miss Fixer at the Valley Playhouse in Los Angeles.
