= Queen of the Rushes =

1906 novel by the Welsh writer Allen Raine

Queen of the Rushes is a 1906 novel by the Welsh writer Allen Raine, written in the English language and first published by Hutchinson & Co.

It was the eighth of Allen Raine's novels, and is considered by many to be her best. It is set against the events of the recent 1904–1905 Welsh revival, and is subtitled A Tale of the Welsh Revival. Evan Roberts, the leader of the revival, appears as a character in the book.

== Plot ==
The book begins with the sinking of a small vessel, resulting in the deaths of several agricultural labourers. The incident orphans two of the main characters: Gwynifer, who is struck dumbstruck by the sight of her mother drowned, and Gildas, who inherits his father's farm. Gwynifer becomes devoted to Gildas, but he instead marries the vivacious Nance Ellis, granddaughter of one of his tenants; Nance becomes caught up in the revival, as does a sea captain, Jack Davies, with whom she falls in love, while Gwynifer and Gildas remain aloof from what they consider the excessive zeal of the local congregation.
