= The Murdoch Trial =

- Directed by: Laurence Trimble
- Starring: Florence Turner; Frank Tennant; Richard Norton
- Production company: Florence Turner Productions
- Distributed by: Hepworth Pictures
- Release date: March 1914
- Running time: 4 reels
- Country: United Kingdom
- Languages: Silent; English intertitles

The Murdoch Trial is a 1914 British silent drama film directed by Laurence Trimble and starring Florence Turner, Frank Tennant and Richard Norton. It was shot at Walton Studios.

== Cast ==
- Florence Turner as Helen Story
- Frank Tennant as Lionel Mann
- Richard Norton as Henry Murdock
- William Felton as The Butler
- G.C. Colonna as The Nephew
- John Kelt as The Prosecution
- Alfred Phillips as The Defense
- Lucy Sibley as The Housekeeper
- Laurence Trimble as A Butler

== Bibliography ==
- Low, Rachael. The History of the British Film: 1906-1914. Allen & Unwin, 1973.
