= A Tin-Type Romance =

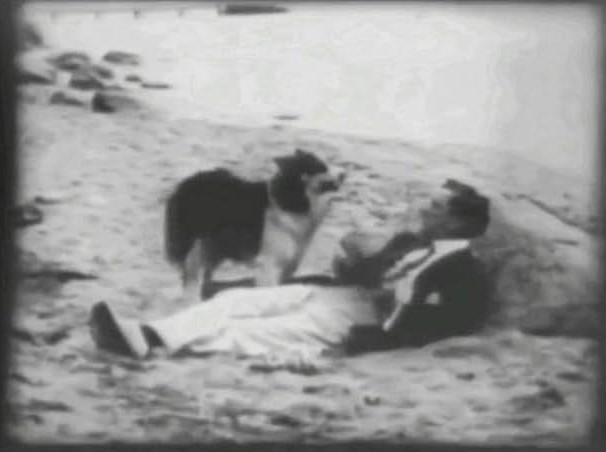
- Film still
- Directed by: Laurence Trimble
- Produced by: Vitagraph Company of America
- Distributed by: General Film Company
- Release date: December 6, 1910
- Running time: 1 reel
- Country: United States
- Language: Silent with English titles

A Tin-Type Romance is a 1910 surviving silent film short produced by Vitagraph Studios and featuring early canine star Jean. Contrary to some sources, Maurice Costello is not listed in the cast lineup. Filmed in the Portland, Maine area. The photo booth scene was filmed at Palace Playland in Old Orchard Beach, Maine.

== Plot summary ==
Phil and Beth meet one day at the seaside. They pass a photograph gallery where they decide to have their tin-types taken, and each one lovingly puts the other's picture into their own locket.

At their next meeting, Phil and Beth agree to marry. However, when Phil tries to prove that Beth's picture is in his locket, the catch sticks and he cannot open it. The couple fight and separate, and the film implies that each of them will now try to kill themselves.

Phil’s dog, Jean, fixes the situation - she picks up Phil's locket and places it near Beth, and then returns with Beth's locket to Phil. Each one opens the other's locket, and sees that their own tin-type is indeed in there. The couple then reconcile and renew their engagement.

== Cast ==
- Leo Delaney - Phil
- Florence Turner - Beth
- Jean - Jean, a Dog

=== unbilled ===
- Kenneth Casey - Little Boy
- Adele DeGarde - Little Girl
- William Shea - Bit

== See also ==
- List of American films of 1910
