= Far from the Madding Crowd (1915 film) =

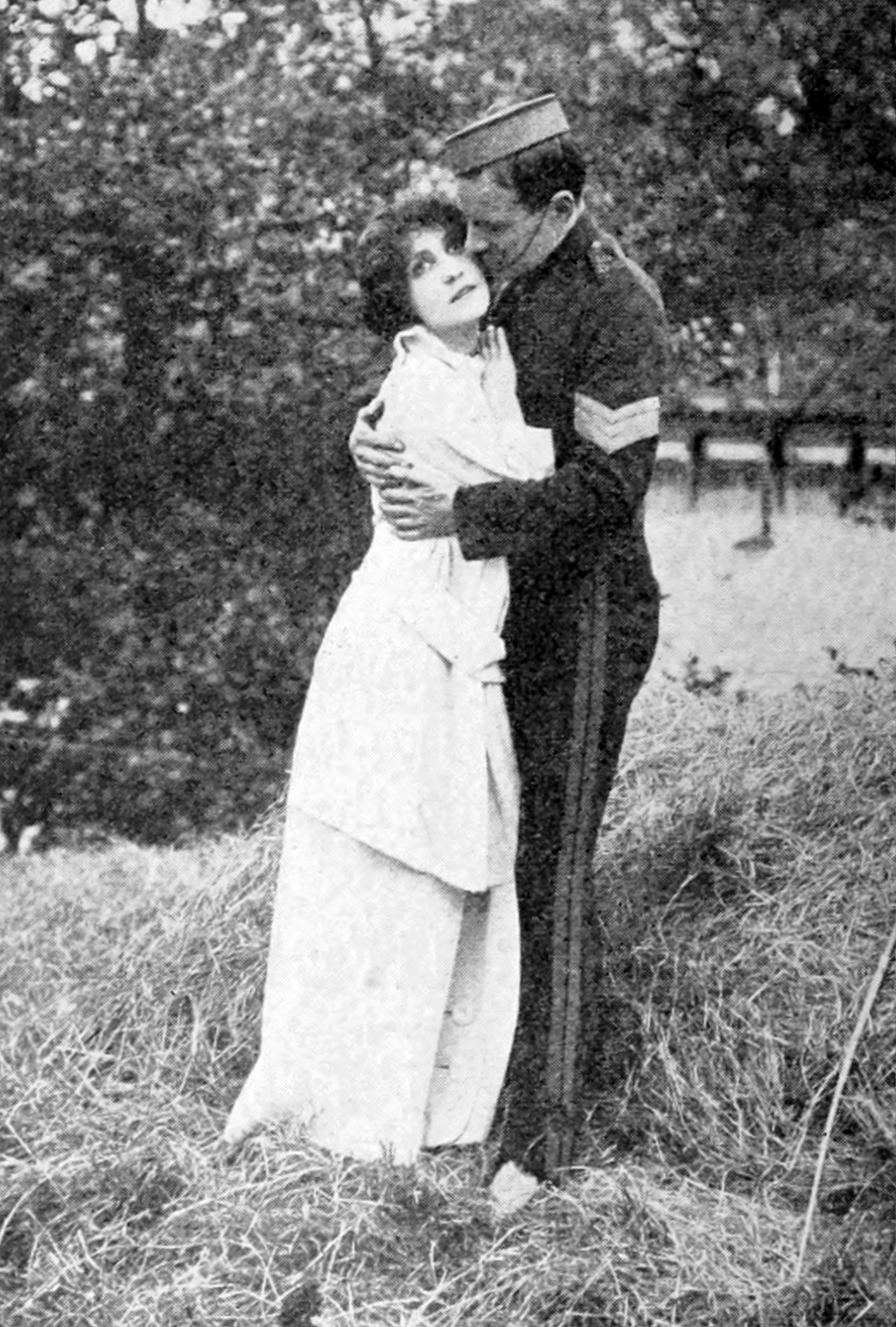
- Florence Turner and Henry Edwards in Far from the Madding Crowd; NB probably not Edwards, but Campbell Gullan
- Directed by: Laurence Trimble
- Screenplay by: Laurence Trimble
- Based on: Far from the Madding Crowd by Thomas Hardy
- Produced by: Laurence Trimble
- Production company: Turner Films
- Distributed by: Ideal Film Company (UK); Mutual Film (US)
- Release date: 16 November 1915 (London)
- Running time: Five reels
- Country: United Kingdom

Far from the Madding Crowd is a 1915 British silent drama film produced and directed by Laurence Trimble and starring Florence Turner, Henry Edwards and Malcolm Cherry. Trimble also adapted Thomas Hardy's 1874 novel for the screen. Far from the Madding Crowd is a lost film. The film was the first adaptation on screen of the novel.

== Cast ==
- Florence Turner as Bathsheba Everdene
- Henry Edwards as Gabriel Oak
- Malcolm Cherry as Farmer Boldwood
- Campbell Gullan as Sergeant Troy
- Marion Grey as Fanny Robin
- Dorothy Rowan as Lyddie
- John MacAndrews as Farmhand
- Johnny Butt as Farmhand
- Jean as Gabriel's dog

== Production ==
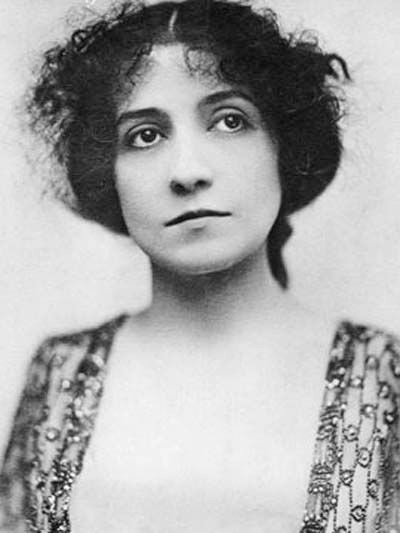
Florence Turner in 1916

The rights to adapt Far from the Madding Crowd for the screen were secured in 1915 by Turner Films, an independent film production company established in England by American film star Florence Turner. Filmmaker Laurence Trimble, who had often directed Turner while they were at Vitagraph Studios, was head of production for Turner Films, which had its studios at Walton-on-Thames.

Little is known about the production, apart from its being shot in authentic locales in Dorset. After the film's premiere on 16 November 1915, at a private screening at London's West End Cinema, the press response was favorable. The Times wrote that Hardy "can have little reason to complain of the way in which his work has been handled. … One feels that the country in which the action is laid is really the Wessex of the novel and that the farm, the cattle, the sheep are the genuine ones over which Gabriel Oak watched with such care." In February 1916, the five-reel feature film was given a general release in Britain.

On 19 June 1916 the film was released in the United States, the first of six Turner productions to be distributed in the U.S. by Mutual Film. The production was panned in a Variety review, which criticized the narrative as hard to follow and deemed the 30-year-old Turner as "no longer qualified physically to portray the roles of the simple ingenue type". The reviewer concluded, "Far from the Madding Crowd is one of those stories of the type that appeared a decade or two ago in The Fireside Companion, intended primarily for consumption in the scullery and pantry by the maids and the cook and the picture carries the same atmosphere."

Hardy does not appear to have seen the film, although he wrote program notes for its premiere. The film's success in Britain prompted him to write his publisher that he was "glad to hear that Far from the Madding Crowd comes out so well." By 1920 Hardy had changed his opinion, saying that it "seems to have been a failure". No box office records are available to determine the film's financial success. Turner Films ceased production after Trimble and Turner returned to the U.S. later in 1916.
