= Shopgirls =

- Directed by: Laurence Trimble
- Written by: Hector Dion
- Starring: Florence Turner; Sidney Sinclair; Richard Steele
- Production company: Florence Turner Productions
- Distributed by: Hepworth Pictures
- Release date: December 1914
- Running time: 3,500 feet
- Country: United Kingdom
- Languages: Silent; English intertitles

Shopgirls is a 1914 British silent drama film directed by Laurence Trimble and starring Florence Turner, Sidney Sinclair and Richard Steele.

== Cast ==
- Florence Turner as Judith
- Sidney Sinclair as Archer
- Richard Steele as James Walker
- Hector Dion as John Carter
- Rhoda Grey as Grace

== Bibliography ==
- Brian McFarlane & Anthony Slide. The Encyclopedia of British Film: Fourth Edition. Oxford University Press, 2013.
