= Fool's Gold (1919 film) =

1919 film

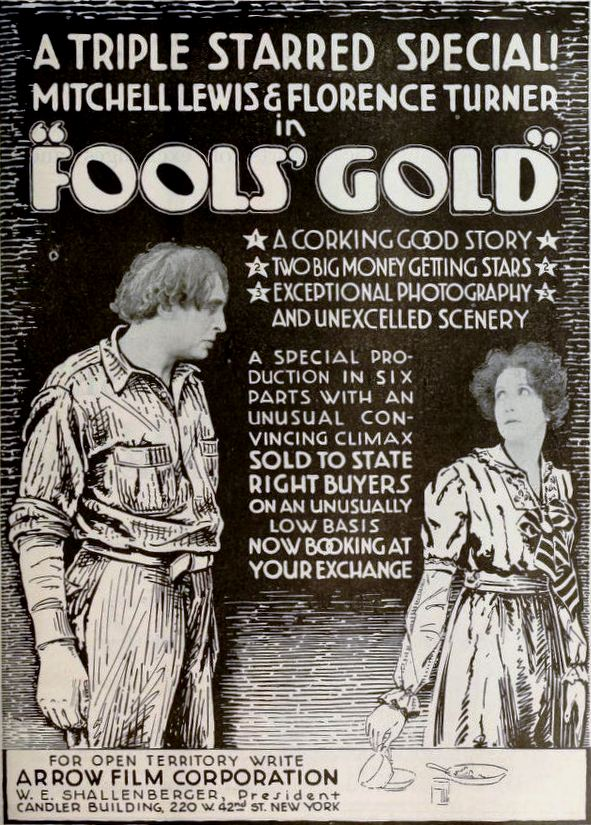
- Ad for film
- Directed by: Laurence Trimble
- Written by: M. A. Miller
- Starring: Mitchell Lewis; Florence Turner
- Cinematography: H. A. Horn
- Distributed by: Arrow Film Corporation
- Release date: May 26, 1919
- Running time: Six reels
- Country: United States
- Language: Silent (English intertitles)

Fool's Gold is a 1919 American silent drama film directed by Laurence Trimble. A copy of the film survives in the British Film Institute's National Film and Television Archive.

== Plot ==
As described in a film magazine, Marshall Strong (Lewis) and John Moore (Playter) are partners in a mine and both love school teacher Constance Harvey (Turner). She prefers Strong, but Moore is crafty and she marries him. Moore is killed in a bar fight and Strong, who had come to the rescue, is accused of murder. Constance and Strong might have still found each other but Lilas Niles (Truax), through a ruse, brings about a misunderstanding and marries herself Strong.

Twenty years later Strong, calling himself Mark Smith, is a wealthy mine operator and he and Lilas have a daughter Nancy (Brent). Constance is still a widow and her son David Moore (Greene) gets a job working at the mine and meets Nancy. Mark Smith does not take proper safety precautions for the mine workers and there is discontent. David is a power for good sense and moderation, and the mine owner trusts him. Nancy's mother Lilas has arranged an engagement for her daughter to an English baronet, Sir Horace Seaton (Hyde).

There is an explosion at the mine, and David and Sir Horace rush to the burning mine and try to rescue Mark and the other miners. They pass through a long gallery in flames, but are unsuccessful. However, Mark and the miners have escaped through a side passage. As a result, Mark becomes more generous in the mining operation, and David and Nancy are later wed.

== Cast ==
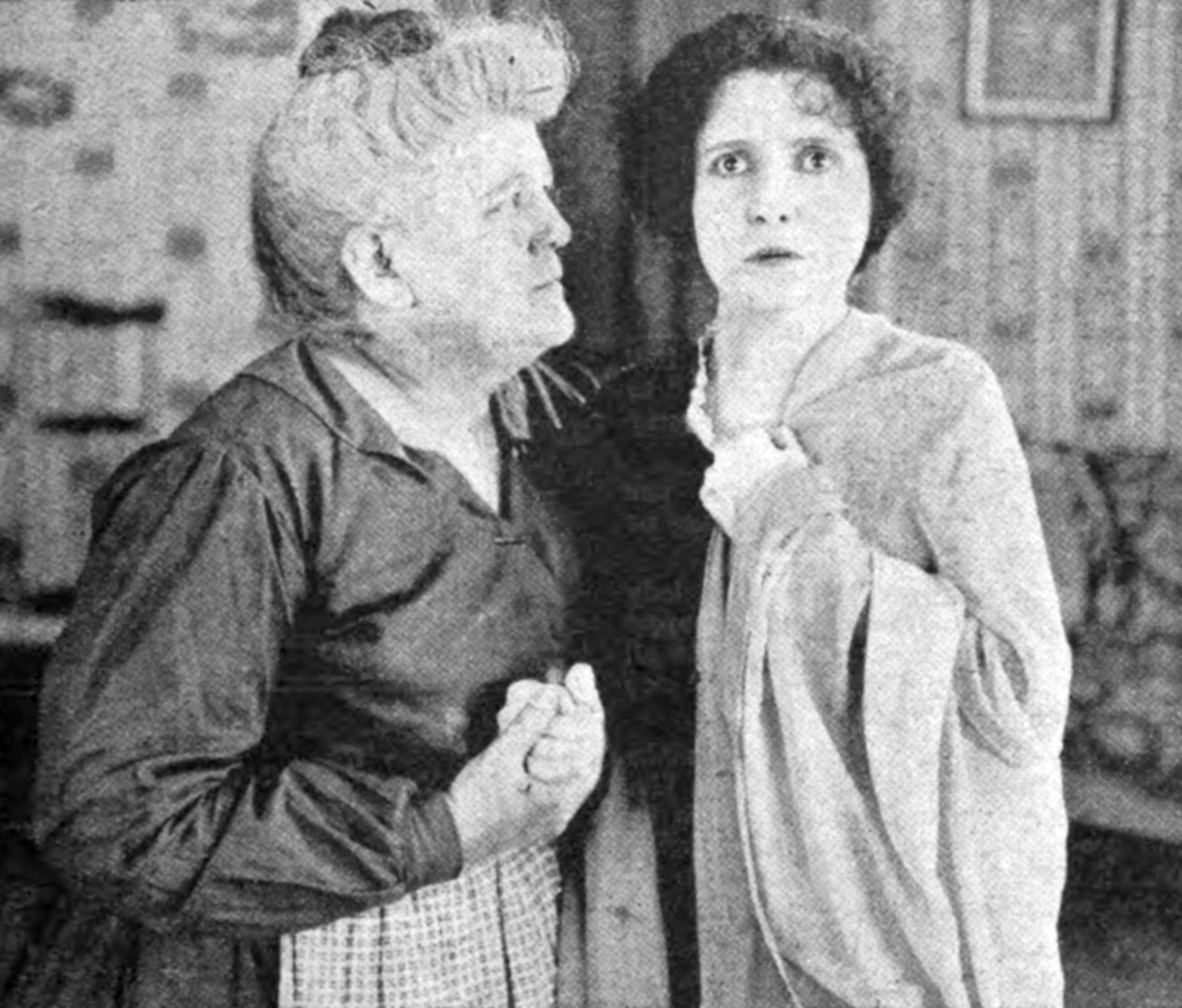
Florence Turner (right) in Fool's Gold

- Mitchell Lewis as Marshall Strong
- Wellington A. Playter as John Moore
- Florence Turner as Constance Harvey
- Sarah Truax as Lilas Niles (as Sarah Truex)
- Francis Joyner as Old Niles
- Kempton Greene as David Moore
- Evelyn Brent as Nancy Smith
- Mlle. Marguerite Serruys as Miss Hatch
- Harry Hyde as Sir Horace Seaton
