= Jean the Match-Maker =

- Directed by: Laurence Trimble
- Produced by: Vitagraph Company of America
- Starring: Florence Turner; Charles Kent; Jean
- Distributed by: General Film Company
- Release date: September 20, 1910
- Running time: 13 minutes, 1,000 feet
- Country: United States
- Language: Silent with English titles

Jean the Match-Maker is a surviving 1910 American short silent film directed by Laurence Trimble, produced by the Vitagraph Company of America and starring their canine star Jean, the Vitagraph Dog. Co-starring are the Vitagraph Girl Florence Turner and early stars Mary Fuller, Charles Kent and Ralph Ince.

== Cast ==
- Florence Turner
- Charles Kent
- Jean
- Mary Fuller
- Ralph Ince

== See also ==
- List of American films of 1910
