= Daisy Doodad's Dial =

1914 British film by Florence Turner

- Directed by: Florence Turner
- Starring: Florence Turner; Laurence Trimble
- Production company: Turner Film Company
- Release date: 1914
- Running time: 9 minutes
- Country: United Kingdom

Daisy Doodad's Dial is a 1914 silent British comedy film, directed by Florence Turner, who also starred in the film alongside Laurence Trimble.

== Plot ==
Daisy Doodad and her husband decide to enter a face-pulling competition, but on the day Daisy is prevented from taking part because she has a toothache. Her husband ends up winning first prize, which greatly annoys her.

When she sees an advertisement for another face-pulling competition, she is determined to win, and spends time practising in a railway carriage and on the street. This eventually results in her arrest, for disturbing the peace. Her husband pays for her to be bailed, but she accuses him of arranging for her to be arrested.

Going to bed in a state of annoyance, Daisy has a nightmare featuring her own face-pulling efforts. Daisy makes further faces at the camera to end the film.

== Production ==
American actress Florence Turner travelled to Britain in 1913 with Laurence Trimble, producing a number of films with her Turner Film Company between 1913 and 1916. Daisy Doodad's Dial was the only directing credit Turner ever received.
