= Grim Justice =

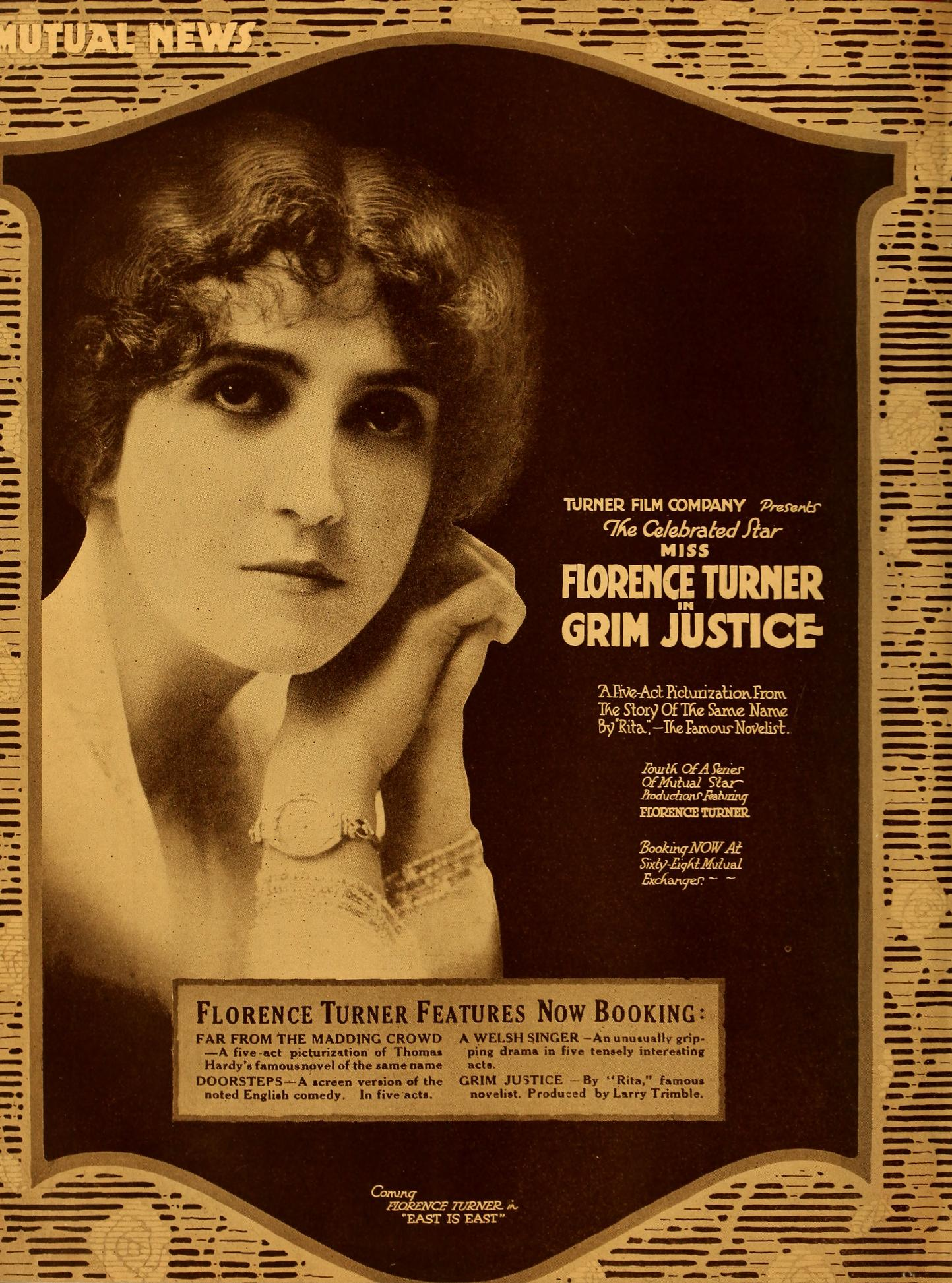
- Directed by: Laurence Trimble
- Written by: Rita (novel); Laurence Trimble
- Produced by: Florence Turner
- Starring: Florence Turner; Henry Edwards; Malcolm Cherry
- Cinematography: Tom White
- Production company: Florence Turner Productions
- Distributed by: Butcher's Film Service; Mutual Film (US)
- Release date: 1 August 1916
- Running time: 5 reels
- Country: United Kingdom
- Languages: Silent; English intertitles

Grim Justice is a 1916 British silent drama film directed by Laurence Trimble and starring Florence Turner, Henry Edwards, Malcolm Cherry.

== Cast ==
- Florence Turner as Chrystal Transom
- Henry Edwards as Gideon Midhurst
- Malcolm Cherry as James Midhurst
- Winnington Barnes as Jude Transom
- Una Venning as Drucilla Midhurst
- Dorothy Rowan as Hester Midhurst
- Moore Marriott as Grandfather Transom
- Maud Williams as Stepmother

== Bibliography ==
- Low, Rachael. History of the British Film, 1914-1918. Routledge, 2005.
