= Tresaith =

Village in Ceredigion, Wales

Coordinates: 52.13406°N 4.51450°W

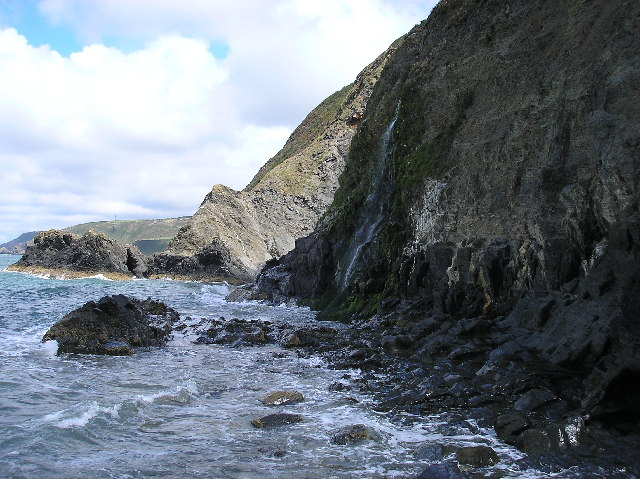
The Waterfall

Tresaith (until the mid-20th century, Traethsaith) is a coastal village in Ceredigion, Wales, between Aberporth and Llangranog. It is linked to the former by a two-mile section of the Ceredigion Coast Path, part of the Wales Coast Path. Tresaith is within the Ceredigion Heritage Coast which offers extensive walking and views. There is an abundance of wildlife and flora. Many kinds of seabirds can be spotted and regular sightings of grey seals and dolphins are made. The village derives its name from the Saith, a small river/stream that runs down the valley towards the east side of the village before flowing into the sea via a waterfall.

== History ==
Until the mid-19th century, Tresaith consisted of two dwellings; a thatched cottage and the Ship Inn. Shipowners, the Parry family, ran the inn. Their first vessel, the New Hope, was built on the beach in 1827. Later, several smacks of about 25 tons operated from Tresaith, bringing in coal, limestone and culm. In the last few decades of the 19th century, the village became popular as a seaside holiday destination and contemporary newspapers referred to it as the Second Brighton.

== Attractions ==
- Tresaith is a European Blue Flag beach. In 2012, the beach was also awarded a Seaside Award. Lifeguards are normally on duty at peak seasons. Tresaith is a popular location for surfing.
- Dolphins can be sighted most summer days. Cardigan Bay has a resident bottle-nosed dolphin population.
- The Waterfall, where the River Saith cascades over the cliffs into the sea.
- Active sailing club, the "Tresaith Mariners" with a mixed fleet of dinghies and catamarans.

== Gallery ==
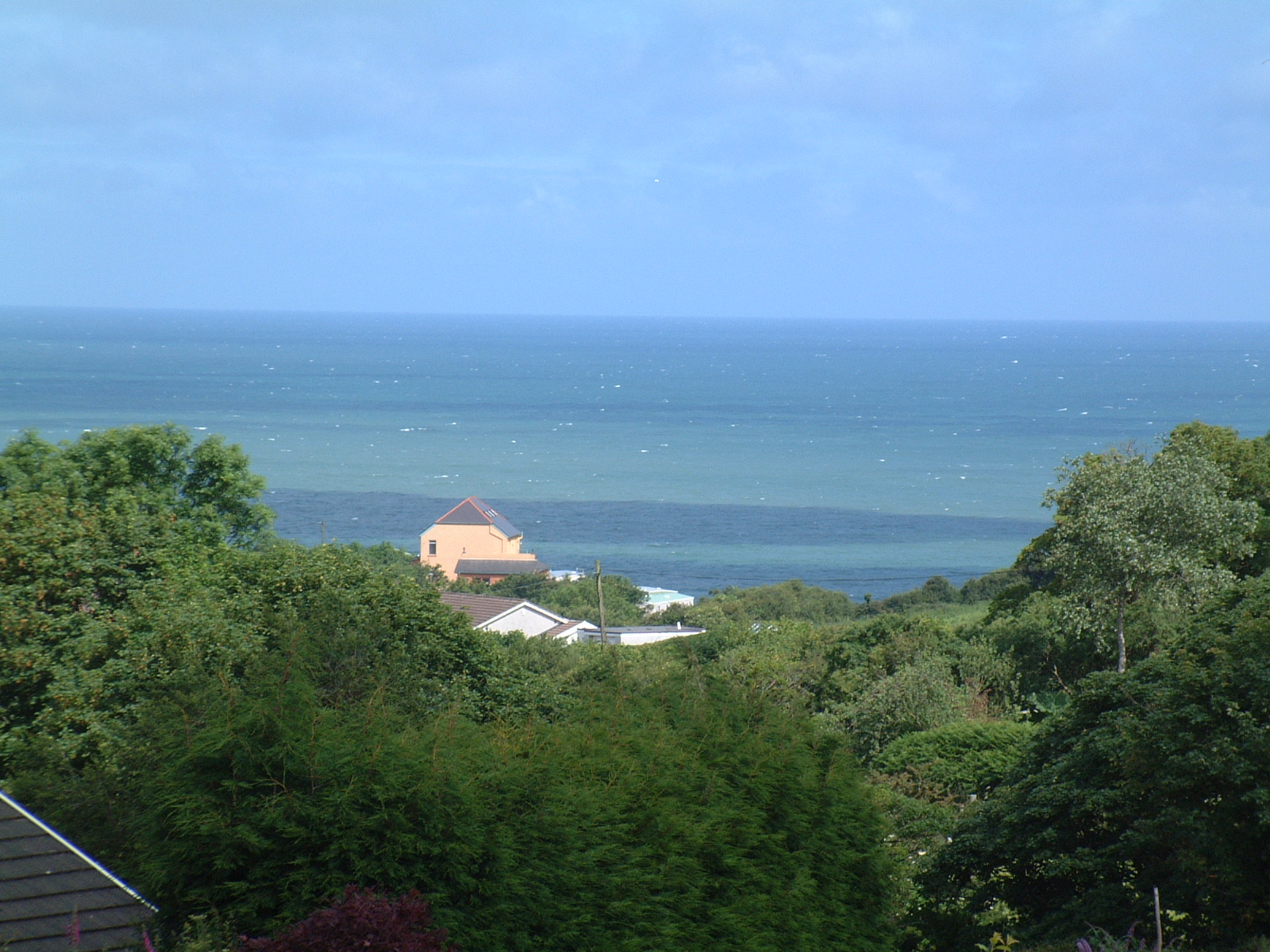
The sea from a house in Tresaith

Tresaith Waterfall

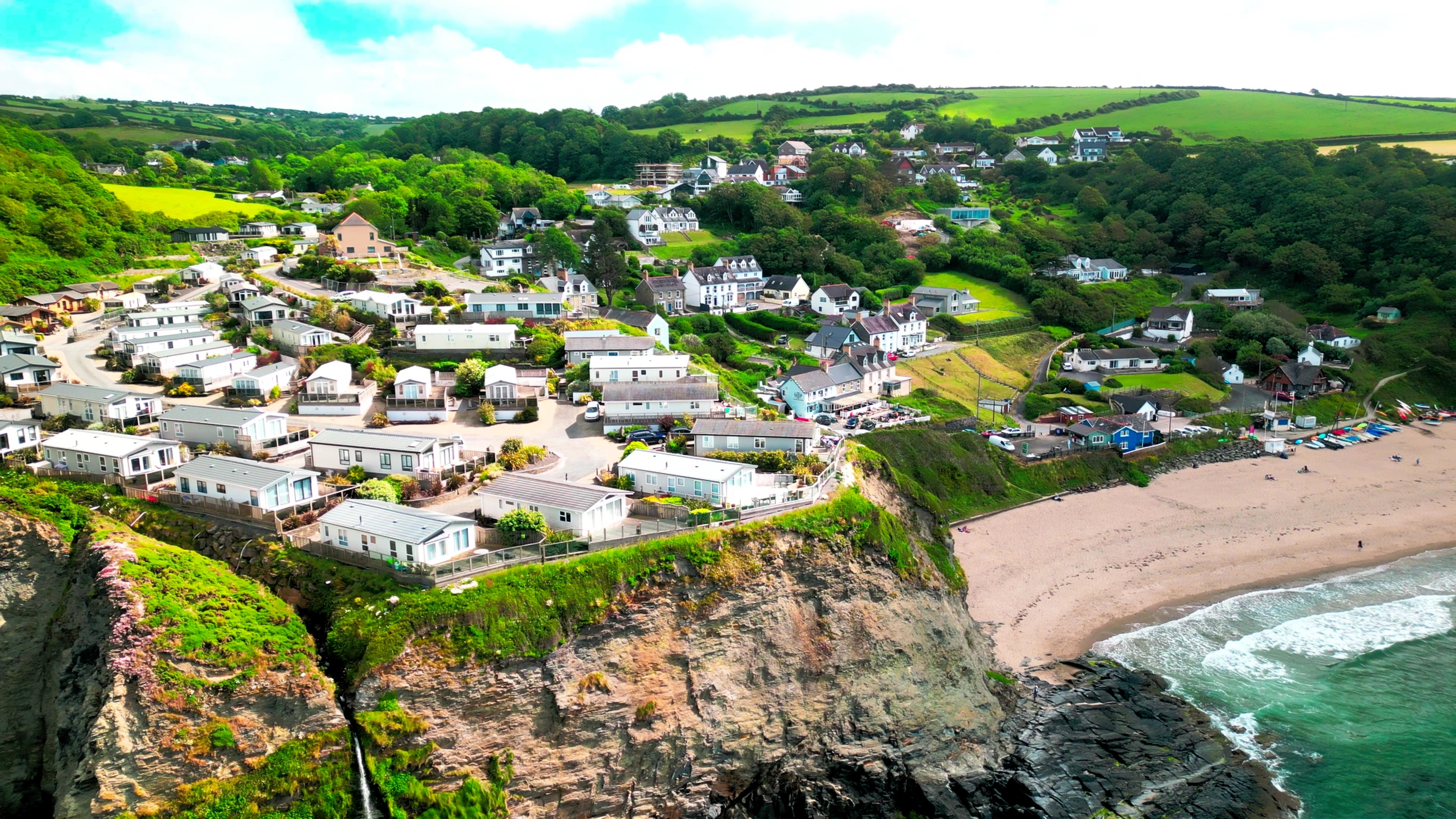
Aerial view of Tresaith
