= Laurence Trimble =

American film director

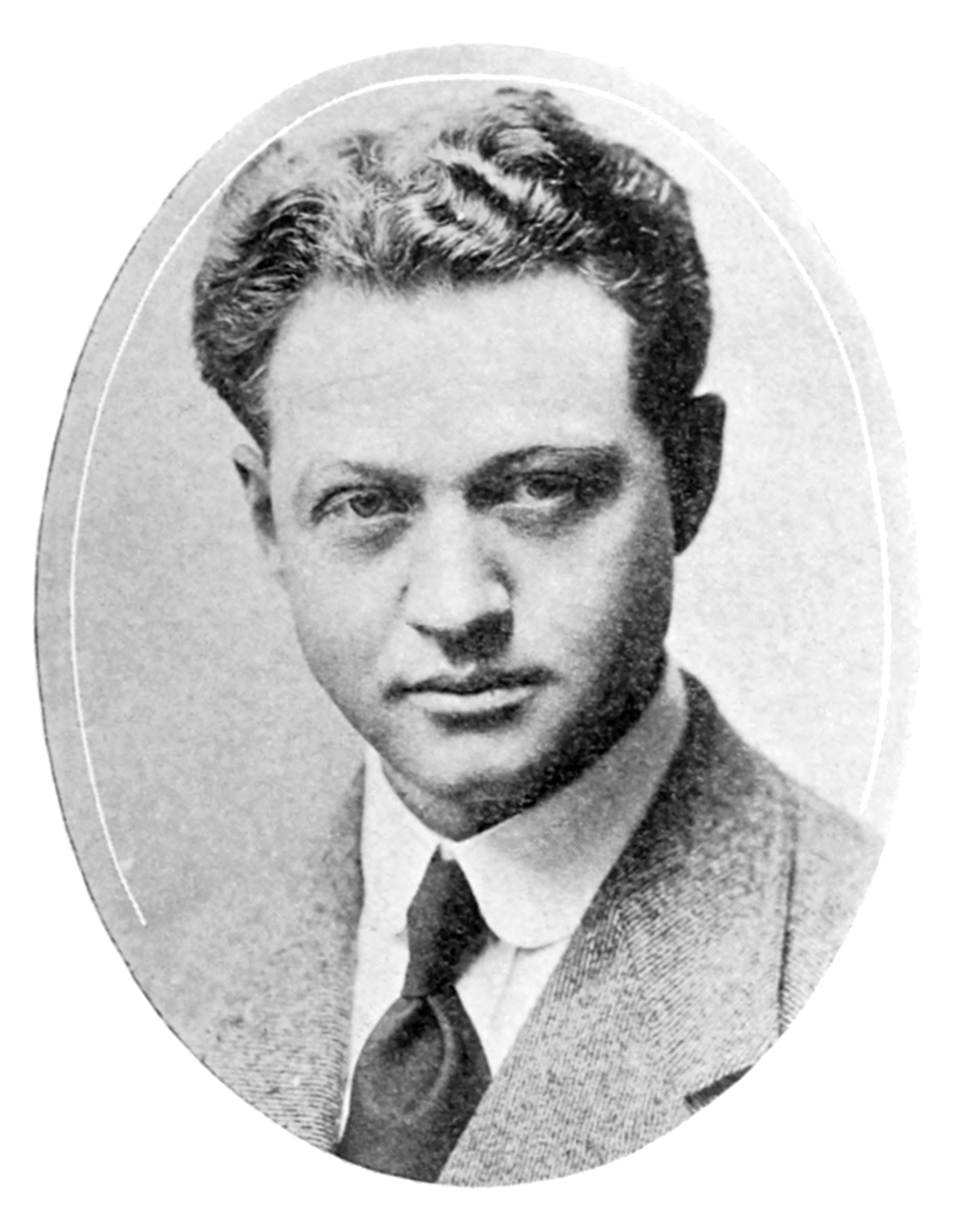
- Larry Trimble in 1916
- Born: Laurence Norwood Trimble; February 15, 1885; Robbinston, Maine, US
- Died: February 8, 1954 (aged 68); Woodland Hills, California, US
- Occupations: Director; writer; actor
- Years active: 1910–1926
- Era: Silent film
- Spouses: Louise Githens Trenton (married 1907–?); Marian Constance Blackton (married 1941–1954)
- Partner: Jane Murfin (c. 1920–1925)
- Children: 1

Laurence Norwood Trimble (February 15, 1885 – February 8, 1954) was an American silent film director, writer and actor. Trimble began his film career directing Jean, the Vitagraph Dog, the first canine to have a leading role in motion pictures. He made his acting debut in the 1910 silent Saved by the Flag, directed scores of films for Vitagraph and other studios, and became head of production for Florence Turner's independent film company in England (1913–1916). Trimble was most widely known for his four films starring Strongheart, a German Shepherd dog he discovered and trained that became the first major canine film star. After he left filmmaking he trained animals exclusively, particularly guide dogs for the blind.

== Biography ==
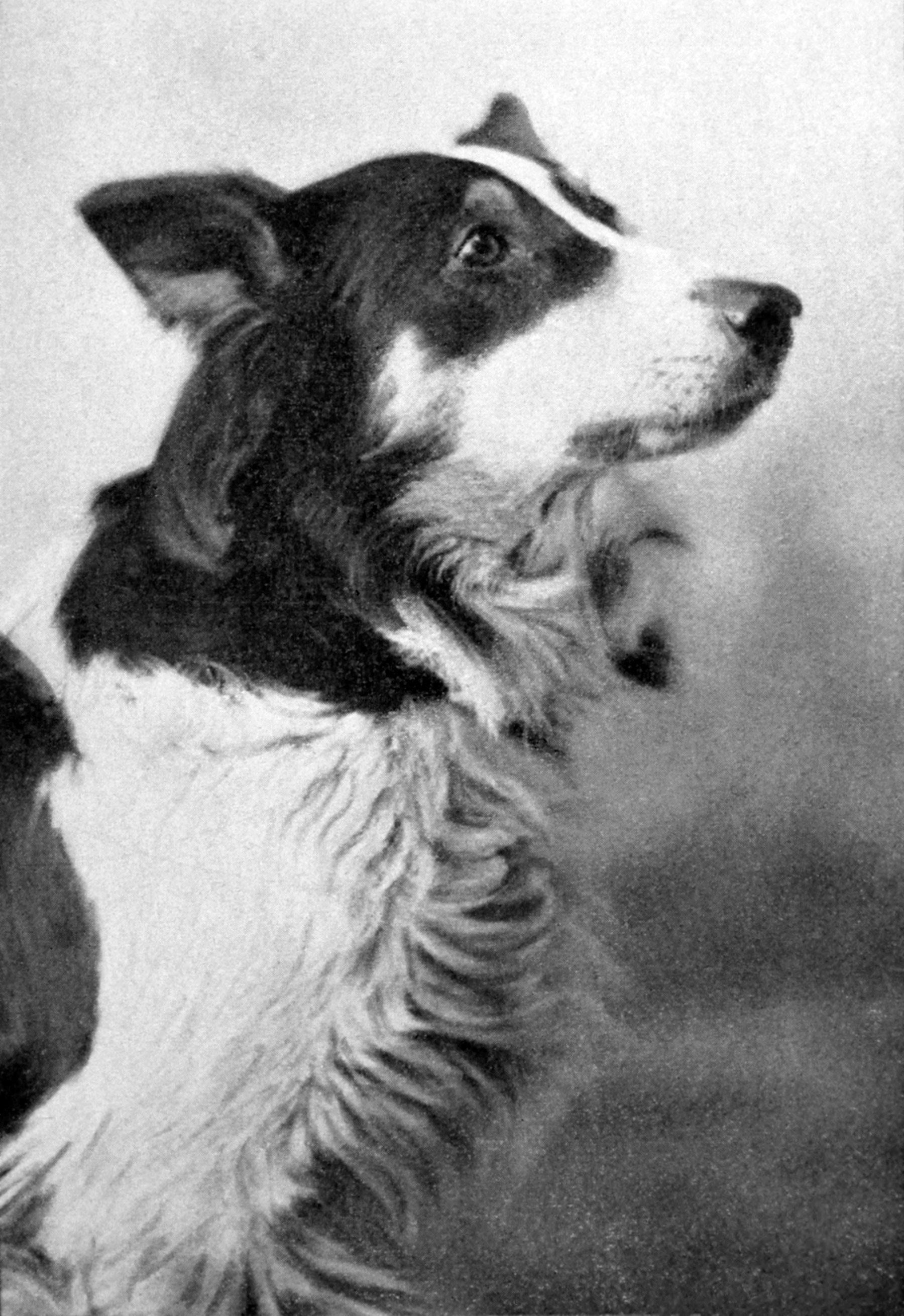
Jean, the Vitagraph Dog

Laurence Norwood Trimble was born February 15, 1885, in Robbinston, Maine. He grew up on a rocky farm near the Bay of Fundy. "I wanted a dog more than anything, but my family could not afford to let me have one," he later wrote. "By the time I had worked my way through school I had owned a number of dogs. Mostly they had bad reputations and nobody else wanted them, but I loved them and learned from them."

Trimble began to write adventure fiction, and sold an animal story to a New York magazine around 1908. In 1909, he visited Vitagraph Studios in New York while doing research for a series of articles called "How Movies Are Made". As he chatted with the sole assistant working under Rollin S. Sturgeon, head of the scenario department, he learned that a story of special interest to producer Albert E. Smith had been set aside because it required a dog that could act—not simply do tricks, but to behave naturally on command. Trimble scanned the script and said he could train any dog to do what was needed.

Trimble asked if there were any dogs around, and was told about a stray that hid in the garage and came out only to snatch scraps left by members of the crew. Trimble spent an hour coaxing the frightened dog out of hiding, and another half-hour winning his confidence. Smith was brought in and saw the dog perform the action the script required. "Your dog is wonderful," Smith told Trimble, "but he's too small"—and he explained that it would be impossible to see a small dog in medium shots, one of Vitagraph's filmmaking innovations. "Oh, he isn't my dog," Trimble replied. He told Smith that the little dog was a stray, suggested that he take him home as a pet, and said, "Tomorrow I'll bring you the right dog for the picture." The next morning Trimble arrived with his dog, a tri-color Scotch Collie named Jean. "Jean, the Vitagraph Dog" became the first canine to have a leading role in motion pictures.

Trimble began his film career at Vitagraph in the spring of 1910. He became one of the studio's leading directors, responsible for all of Jean's films and most of those made by Florence Turner, John Bunny and Flora Finch.

Trimble was married to concert singer Louise Trenton; (Note: The marriage of Trimble and Mary Louise Githens on December 31, 1907, was recorded in Manhattan.) their daughter, Janet, was born in September 1912.

In March 1913, Trimble and Jean resigned from Vitagraph, along with actor Tom Powers and Florence Turner. They went to England, where Turner formed her own company with studios at Walton-on-Thames. Trimble later explained that they went to England because in 1913 "the power of large companies [in the U.S.] left slight opportunity for an independent producer with small capital." Already famous from her Vitagraph films, Turner introduced herself to British audiences with a personal appearance at the London Pavilion on May 26, 1913. She and Trimble then toured Britain for the next six weeks, appearing together at 160 venues.

Trimble was head of production at Turner Films, released by Cecil Hepworth, and over the next three years he wrote and directed some of Britain's most highly regarded films of the period. They included Rose of Surrey (1913), described by The Bioscope as "one of the most charming English film comedies ever produced"; My Old Dutch (1915), which The Moving Picture World called "a rare picture, great in its simplicity, strong in its appeal, and splendidly played by its two principals"; and Far from the Madding Crowd (1915).

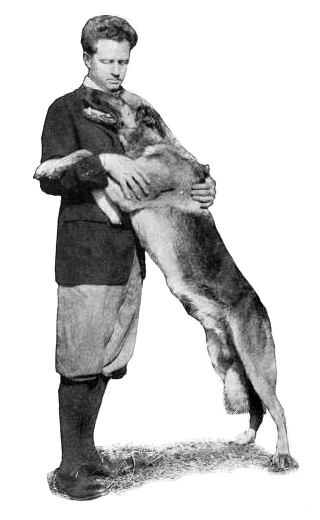
Trimble and Strongheart (1921)

In August 1916, Trimble left his wife in England and returned to the U.S. with his daughter and his canine star Jean, who died later that year. In Hollywood from 1917, Trimble joined the newly formed Goldwyn Pictures. He directed Fool's Gold (1919), an independent production partially filmed in the Cascade Mountains in Washington state, in which Turner tried to return to starring roles in American motion pictures. In 1920 Trimble directed three features for Selznick Pictures—notably, the last two films made by Olive Thomas before her death.

Knowing what qualities a dog needs to be a success in motion pictures — particularly the ability to register feelings that actual conditions do not warrant — Trimble set out to select a German Shepherd dog for his next canine actor. After extensive research he narrowed the field to three specific dogs, one of them in Germany and two in the U.S. In the autumn of 1920, Trimble found a dog at a kennel in White Plains, New York. Etzel von Oeringen was a male German Shepherd born in 1917. He was trained in Berlin as a police dog and served in the German Red Cross during World War I. At age three the dog was brought to the United States to be sold. Trimble recognized Etzel's potential and persuaded Jane Murfin, a screenwriter for his films, to buy the dog. A new name, Strongheart, was suggested by the publicity department of First National Pictures, which released his first film.

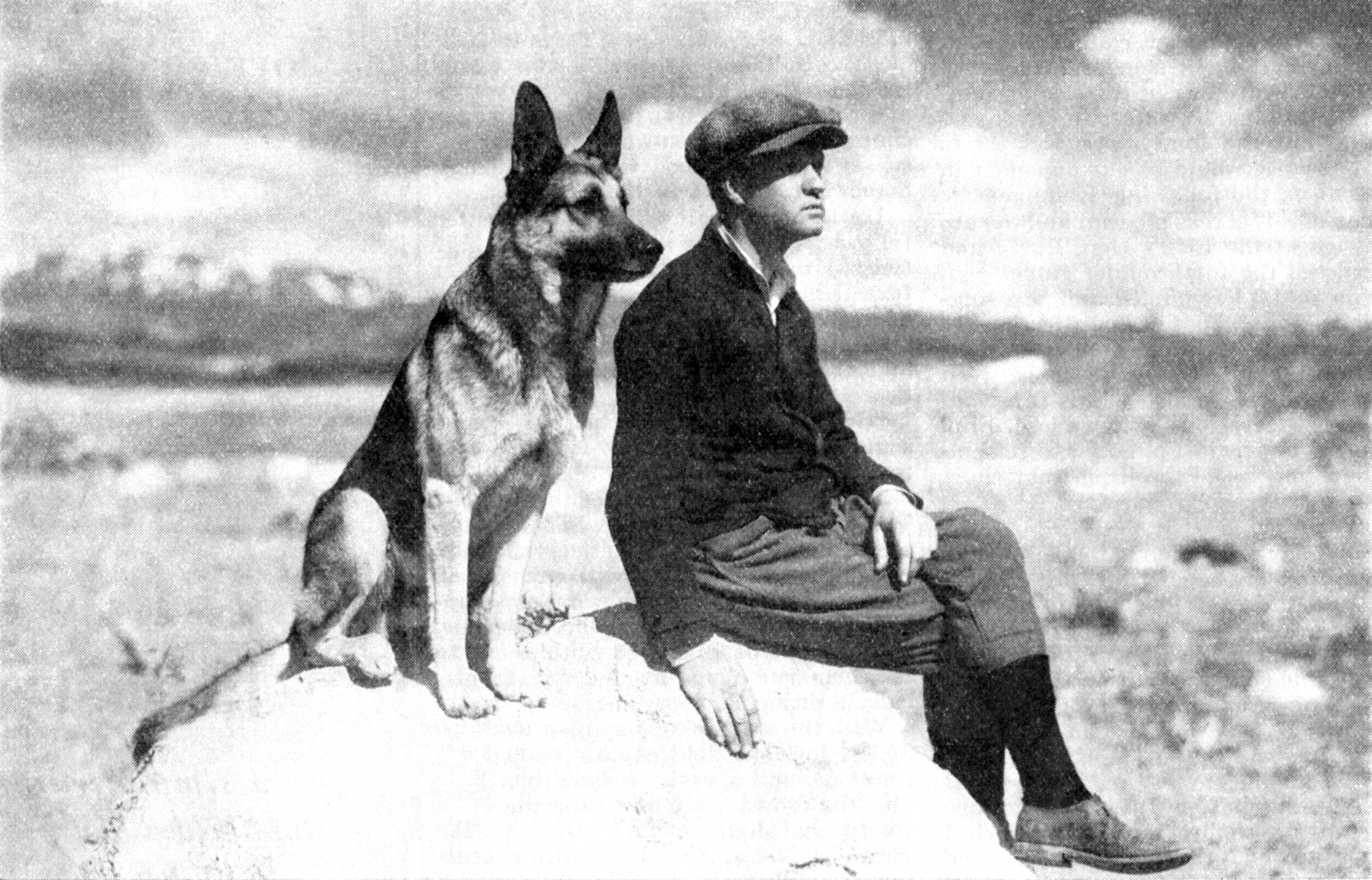
Strongheart and Trimble, in a photograph that led Trimble's series of articles for The American Boy magazine (February 1930)

Strongheart became the first major canine film star. Trimble trained the dog and directed him in four rugged outdoor adventure pictures that were shot on location: The Silent Call (1921), Brawn of the North (1922), The Love Master (1924) and White Fang (1925). The partnership between Trimble and Murfin faltered; after their breakup, (Note: Film historian Kevin Brownlow described the partnership between Trimble and Murfin as both professional and personal. Although some sources describe them as a husband-and-wife filmmaking team, no marriage has been substantiated.) Strongheart's death and the loss of most of his investments in the Wall Street Crash of 1929, Trimble retired from filmmaking and trained animals exclusively. He was able to keep McDonald Island, an island he had purchased on the Saint Lawrence River, and in February 1930 he began writing an occasional feature "about dogs, horses, and other people" for The American Boy magazine.

Trimble's special interest was training guide dogs for the blind. He became president of the dog education foundation that supplied dogs for the Hazel Hurst Foundation of Monrovia, California, and spoke to clubs and community service organizations about the work of the foundation and the need for service dogs. The Hazel Hurst Foundation educated and found employment for the blind, including injured war veterans, and trained German Shepherds as assistance dogs that were given free to each student. By August 1944 the school had supplied the Lockheed-Vega Aircraft Corporation with 300 workers, greatly needed for production work during World War II.

In 1941, Trimble married Marian Constance Blackton, a daughter of J. Stuart Blackton, one of the founders of Vitagraph Studios. In her personal biography of her father, Marian Blackton Trimble recalled watching Trimble work with Jean on location in 1909:

If any member of the company had stepped out of the group that sunny morning and pointing a finger first at Larry Trimble and then at the producer's scrawny, eight-year-old daughter and said, "These two will be married one day", we would have thought it the prophecy of a lunatic. For myself I would have protested hotly that I would never marry a man with red hair.

"It was a second marriage for them both," wrote film historian Anthony Slide, "a loving and constant relationship."

In 1950, the Los Angeles Times reported on one of the presentations on dog training that Trimble gave to Sunday-school classes. He would take his one-year-old German Shepherd, Bambi, or one of his other five dogs, and tell the children about dogs and how to care for them. He told this particular group of young people at Mount Hollywood Congregational Church how he made friends with dogs, and how dogs could help them make friends with other people. "A dog has no politics or religion, so you can tell people about him freely, and when you have finished you have talked to them about themselves", Trimble said. "I can tell more about people from what they say about their dogs than from what they say about themselves."

Trimble died from a heart ailment on February 8, 1954, at age 68, at the Motion Picture Country House and Hospital in Woodland Hills, California.

== Accolades ==
Trimble was inducted into the Hollywood Walk of Fame on February 8, 1960. His star is located at 6340 Hollywood Boulevard.

== Select filmography ==
Larry Trimble served as director of these motion pictures unless otherwise noted.

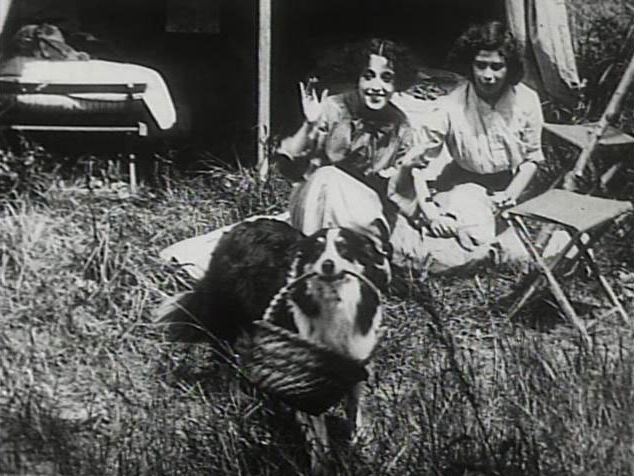
Scene from Jean the Match-Maker (1910)

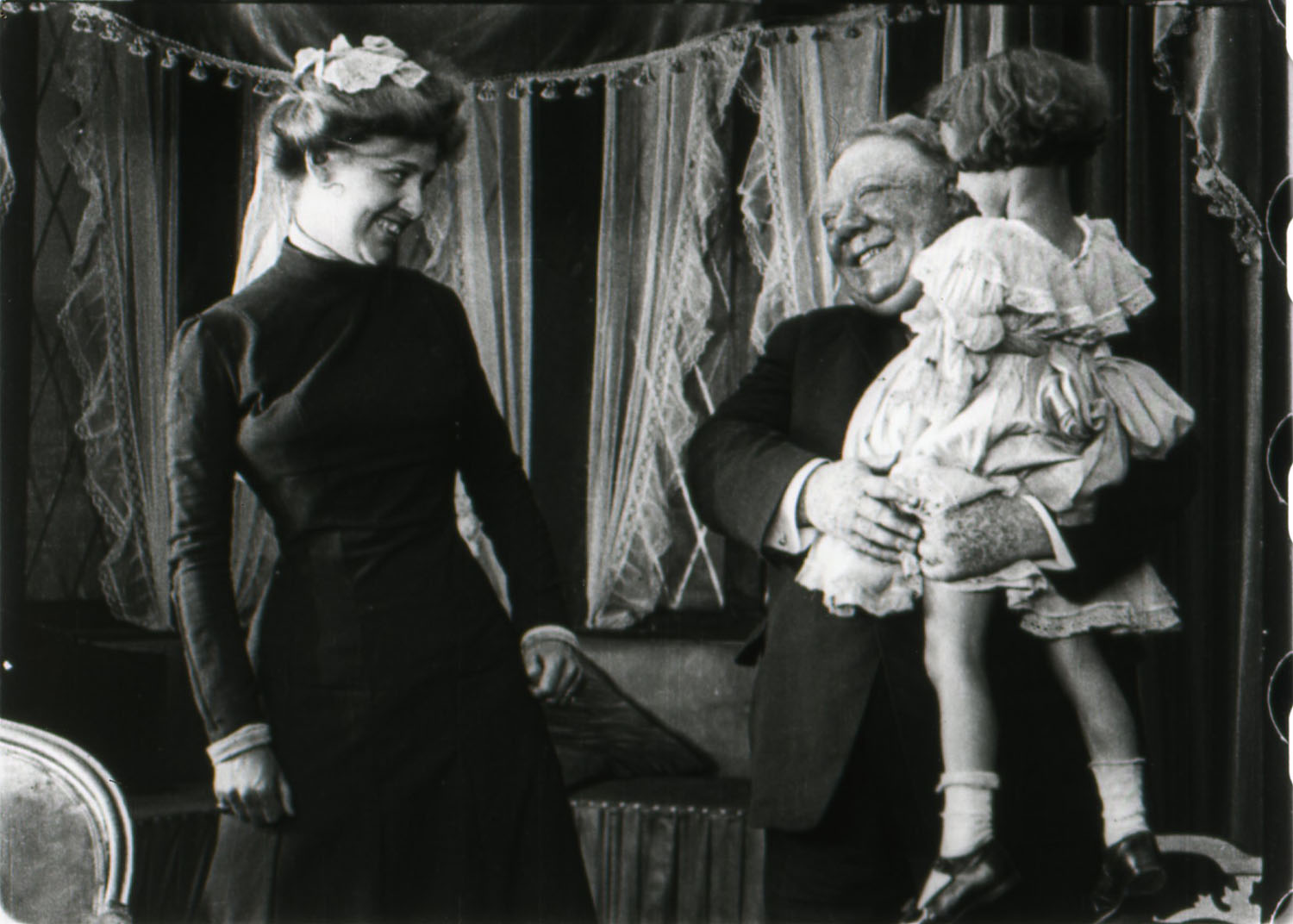
Mae Costello, John Bunny and Helene Costello in Her Crowning Glory (1911)

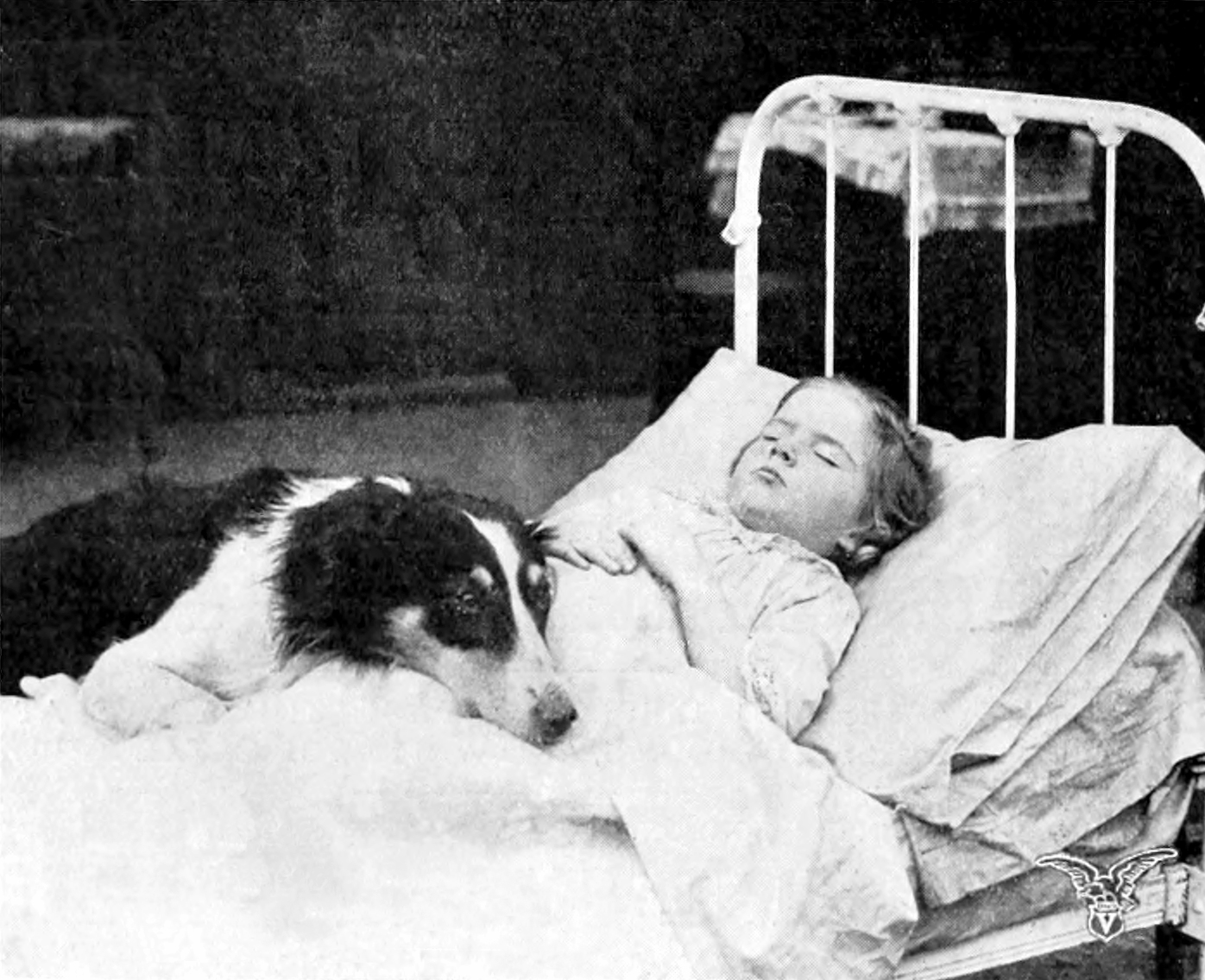
Scene from Playmates (1912)

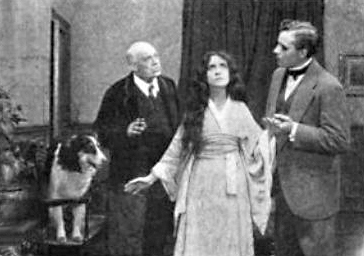
Jean and Florence Turner in Jean's Evidence (1913)

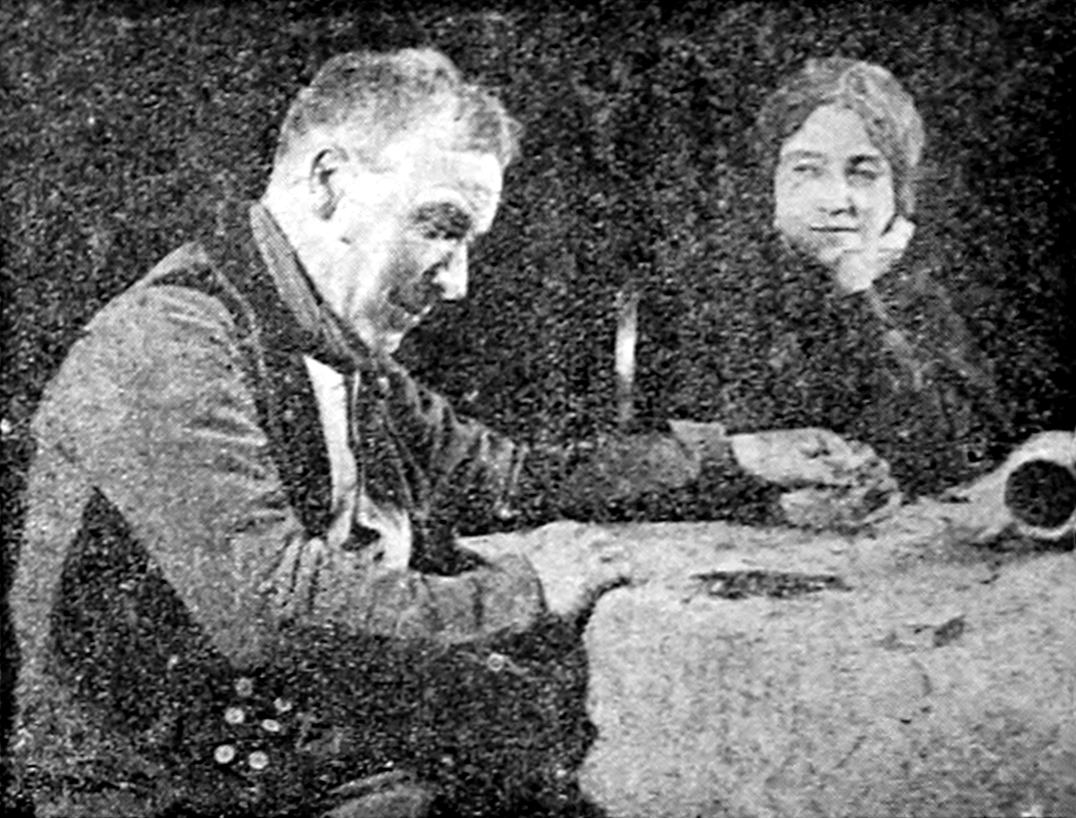
Albert Chevalier and Florence Turner in My Old Dutch (1915)

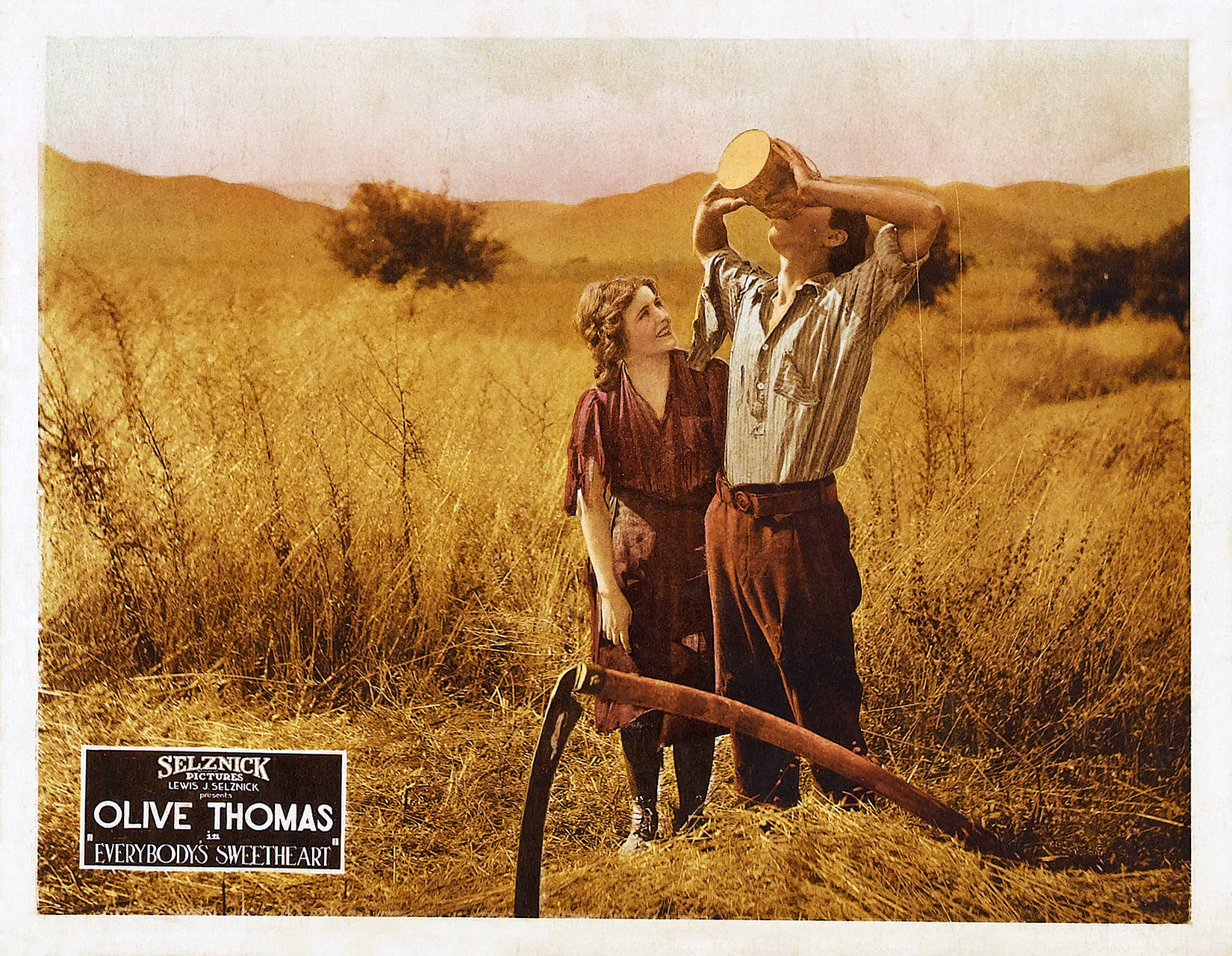
Lobby card for Everybody's Sweetheart (1920)

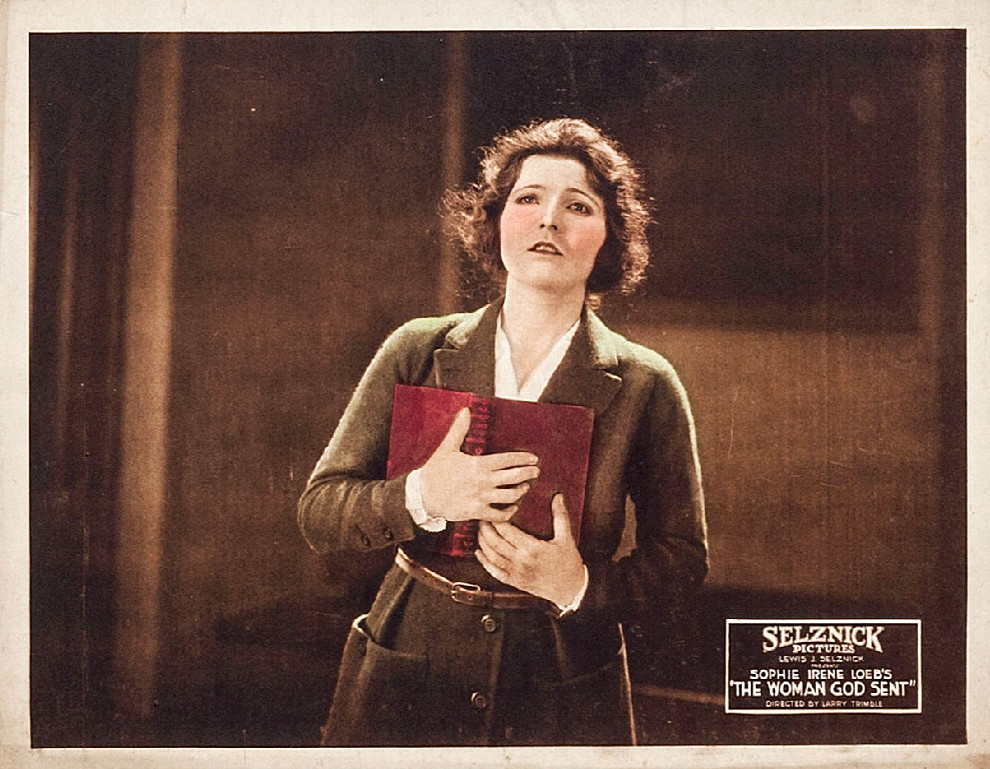
Lobby card for The Woman God Sent (1920)

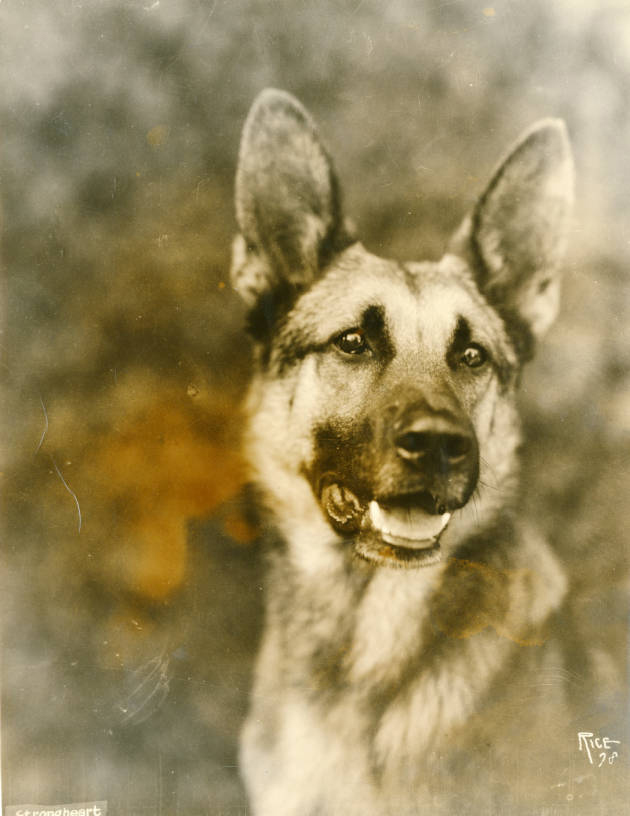
Strongheart (1921)

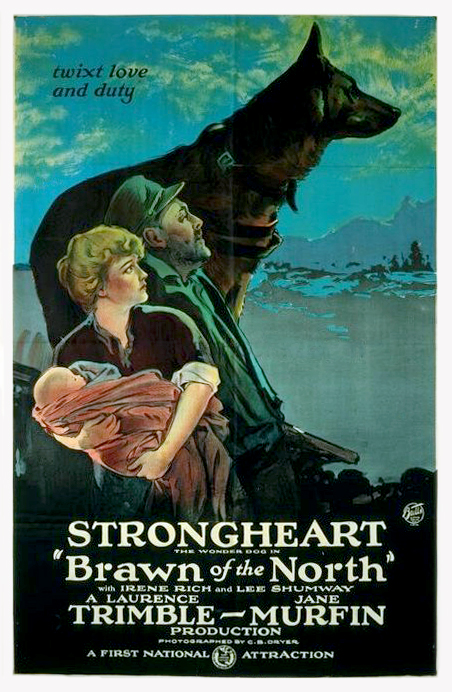
Poster for Brawn of the North (1922)

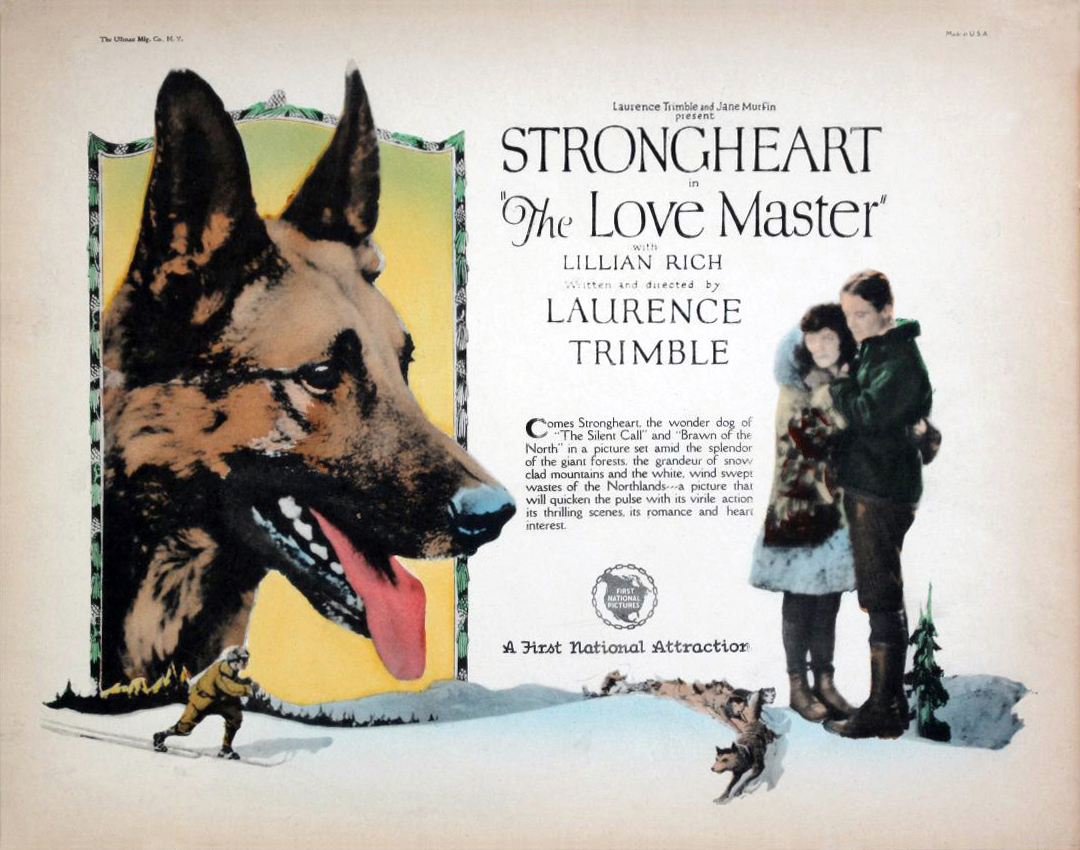
Lobby card for The Love Master (1924)

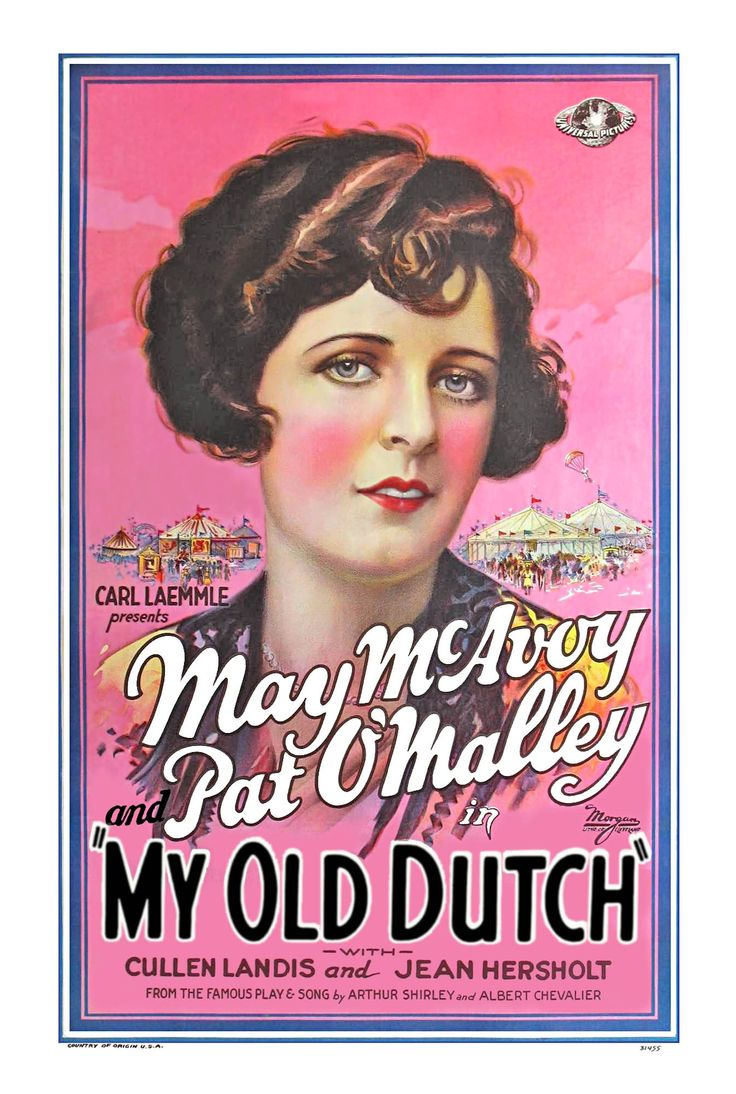
Poster for My Old Dutch (1926)

| Year | Title | Notes |
|---|---|---|
| 1910 | Saved by the Flag | Short film, actor only |
| 1910 | Her Mother's Wedding Gown | Short film featuring Jean |
| 1910 | Jean and the Calico Doll | Short film starring Jean |
| 1910 | Jean the Match-Maker | Short film starring Jean |
| 1910 | Auld Robin Grey | Short film |
| 1910 | Jean Goes Foraging | Short film starring Jean |
| 1910 | Jean Goes Fishing | Short film starring Jean |
| 1910 | A Tin-Type Romance | Short film starring Jean |
| 1910 | Jean and the Waif | Short film starring Jean |
| 1910 | Where the Winds Blow | Short film starring Jean |
| 1911 | Jean Rescues | Short film starring Jean |
| 1911 | When the Light Waned | Short film starring Jean |
| 1911 | Red Eagle | Short film |
| 1911 | The Prejudice of Pierre Marie | Short film |
| 1911 | The Battle Hymn of the Republic | Short film |
| 1911 | In the Arctic Night | Short film |
| 1911 | Man to Man | Short film |
| 1911 | Her Crowning Glory | Short film |
| 1911 | Wig Wag | Short film |
| 1911 | Auld Lang Syne | Short film starring Jean |
| 1911 | Hypnotizing the Hypnotist | Short film |
| 1911 | One Touch of Nature | Short film |
| 1912 | Jean Intervenes | Short film starring Jean |
| 1912 | Playmates | Short film starring Jean |
| 1912 | Cardinal Wolsey | Short film co-directed with J. Stuart Blackton |
| 1912 | The French Spy | Short film |
| 1912 | Bunny and the Dogs | Short film |
| 1912 | Bunny's Suicide | Short film |
| 1912 | Bachelor Buttons | Short film featuring Jean |
| 1912 | Bunny All at Sea | Short film |
| 1912 | Bunny at the Derby | Short film |
| 1912 | Michael McShane, Matchmaker | Short film |
| 1912 | Cork and Vicinity | Short film |
| 1912 | The Signal of Distress | Short film featuring Jean |
| 1913 | The Wings of a Moth | Short film |
| 1913 | Everybody's Doing It | Short film |
| 1913 | Views of Ireland | Short film |
| 1913 | The House in Suburbia | Short film |
| 1913 | The Blarney Stone | Short film, also screenwriter |
| 1913 | Checkmated | Short film |
| 1913 | Let 'em Quarrel | Short film |
| 1913 | Jean and Her Family | Short film starring Jean |
| 1913 | There's Music in the Hair | Short film |
| 1913 | A Window on Washington Park | Short film |
| 1913 | Counsellor Bobby | Short film |
| 1913 | Up and Down the Ladder | Short film |
| 1913 | Cutey Plays Detective | Short film |
| 1913 | Does Advertising Pay? | Short film |
| 1913 | Pickwick Papers | Also screenwriter |
| 1913 | Pumps | Short film |
| 1913 | The Deerslayer | Short film co-directed with Hal Reid |
| 1913 | Rose of Surrey | Short film, first release of Turner Films |
| 1913 | The Harper Mystery | Short film, also screenwriter |
| 1913 | Jean's Evidence | Short film starring Jean, also screenwriter and actor |
| 1913 | The Harper Mystery | Short film, also screenwriter |
| 1913 | The Lucky Stone | Short film |
| 1913 | The Younger Sister | Short film |
| 1914 | The Awakening of Nora | Short film |
| 1914 | Creatures of Habit | Short film, also screenwriter |
| 1914 | Daisy Doodad's Dial | Short film, actor only |
| 1914 | Film Favourites | Short film, also cast member |
| 1914 | Flotilla the Flirt | Short film, also screenwriter |
| 1914 | For Her People | Short film, also screenwriter |
| 1914 | The Murdoch Trial | Also actor |
| 1914 | One Thing After Another | Short film, also screenwriter |
| 1914 | Polly's Progress | Short film |
| 1914 | The Shepherd Lassie of Argyle | Short film featuring Jean, also producer |
| 1914 | Shopgirls | |
| 1914 | Through the Valley of Shadows | Also screenwriter |
| 1915 | Alone in London | Also producer |
| 1915 | As Ye Repent | Also screenwriter and actor |
| 1915 | Caste | Also actor |
| 1915 | The Great Adventure | Also screenwriter |
| 1915 | My Old Dutch | |
| 1915 | Lost and Won | |
| 1915 | Far from the Madding Crowd | Also screenwriter |
| 1915 | A Welsh Singer | Screenwriter only |
| 1916 | Doorsteps | Screenwriter only |
| 1916 | Grim Justice | Also screenwriter and actor |
| 1916 | A Place in the Sun | |
| 1916 | Sally in Our Alley | |
| 1917 | The Spreading Dawn | |
| 1917 | The Auction Block | |
| 1918 | The Light Within | |
| 1919 | Fool's Gold | |
| 1919 | Spotlight Sadie | |
| 1920 | Darling Mine | Also screenwriter |
| 1920 | Everybody's Sweetheart | |
| 1920 | The Woman God Sent | |
| 1920 | Going Some | *writer only |
| 1921 | The Silent Call | |
| 1922 | Brawn of the North | Also producer and screenwriter |
| 1924 | The Love Master | Also producer and screenwriter |
| 1924 | Sundown | Co-directed with Harry O. Hoyt |
| 1925 | White Fang | |
| 1926 | My Old Dutch | Also screenwriter |
