= Lost and Won (1915 film) =

- Directed by: Laurence Trimble
- Written by: Henry Edwards
- Produced by: Florence Turner
- Starring: Florence Turner; Henry Edwards; Edward Lingard
- Production company: Turner Films
- Distributed by: Ideal Films
- Release date: August 1915
- Running time: 4,000 feet
- Country: United Kingdom
- Languages: Silent; English intertitles

Lost and Won is a 1915 British silent drama film directed by Laurence Trimble and starring Florence Turner, Henry Edwards and Edward Lingard.

== Cast ==
- Florence Turner as Barbar Weston
- Henry Edwards as Dick Barry
- Edward Lingard as Howard Lyston
- Herbert Dunsey as Mr. Weston
- James Lindsay
- Minnie Rayner
- Jean, a dog

== Bibliography ==
- Low, Rachael. History of the British Film, 1914-1918. Routledge, 2005.
