= Florence Turner =

American actress (1885–1946)

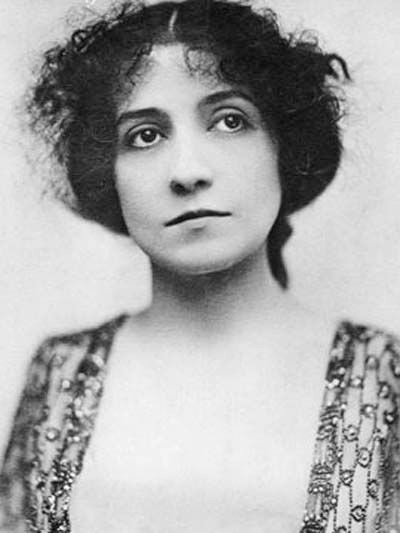
- Turner in 1916
- Born: January 6, 1885; New York City, New York, U.S.
- Died: August 28, 1946 (aged 61); Woodland Hills, California, U.S.
- Occupation: Actress
- Years active: 1907–1943

Florence Turner (January 6, 1885 – August 28, 1946) was an American actress who became known as the "Vitagraph Girl" in early silent films.

== Biography ==
Born in New York City, Turner was pushed into appearing on the stage at age three by her ambitious mother. Turner became a regular performer in a variety of productions. In 1906, she joined the fledgling motion picture business, signing with the pioneering Vitagraph Studios and making her film debut in How to Cure a Cold (June 8, 1907).

At the time there were no stars per se, unless an already famous stage star made a movie. Performers were not even mentioned by name. Long, drawn-out screen credits were non-existent. There was nothing but the name of the company and the picture. As the content of movies evolved from simple incidents or situations into definite stories, some of the heroes and heroines were conceded a vague identity, such as the "Edison Girl", or "The Girl from Sheepshead Bay."

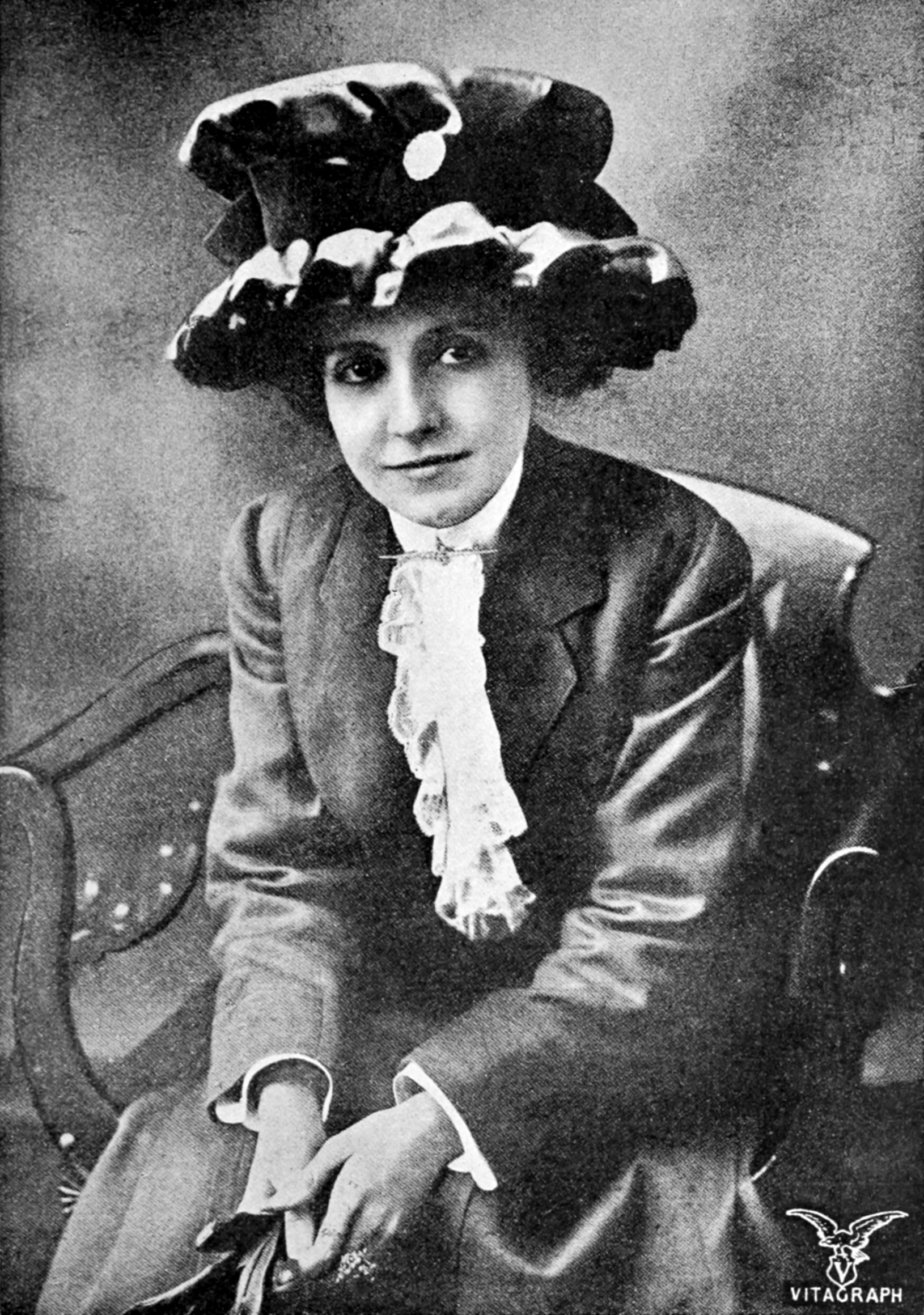
The "Vitagraph Girl" in 1912

Though she was known only as the "Vitagraph Girl" in the early motion picture shorts, Turner became the most popular American actress to appear on screen (which at that time was still dominated by French pictures, especially from the Pathe and Gaumont companies). Her worth to the studio, as its biggest box-office draw, was recognised in 1907 when her pay was upped to $22 a week, as proto-star plus part-time seamstress. It was somewhat less than the male leading players, especially those with stage experience, particularly the super-popular Maurice Costello. In March 1910, she and Florence Lawrence became the first screen actors not already famous in another medium to be publicized by name by their studios to the general public.

Later that year, Florence was paired several times with heartthrob Wallace Reid, who was on his way to stardom. But with the rise of more stars such as Gene Gauntier and Marin Sais at Kalem Studios, Marion Leonard and Mary Pickford at Biograph Studios, and Florence Lawrence (Biograph, moving to IMP in 1910), Florence Turner was no longer quite as special. By 1913 she was looking for new pastures and left the United States accompanied by longtime friend Laurence Trimble, who directed her in a number of movies. They moved to England, where she and Larry began performing together in London music halls.

Daisy Doodad's Dial, a 1914 comedy starring and directed by Turner

Turner sometimes wrote screenplays and directed her own movies, including a number of comedies. She also organized her own production company, Turner Films, for which she made more than thirty shorts. These were shot at the Walton Studios of Cecil Hepworth, west of London.

Turner entertained Allied troops during World War I. She returned to the U.S. after the Armistice, but was not as successful as before. In 1920, she again went to England, where she remained until moving to Hollywood, virtually forgotten, in 1924.

By then she was thirty-nine years of age, and her starring days were long behind her. She continued to act in supporting roles into the 1930s.

“Florence Turner was the original innocent heroine, spirited and resourceful but still pure and virginal, who, stemming as she did from the girl-woman ideals of Gene Stratton-Porter and Eleanor Porter, set the style for Mary Pickford. Blanche Sweet and scores of others later on.” —Biographer Charles Higham in The Art of the American Film (1973).

In 1928, she acted in a minor role on Broadway in Sign of the Leopard, which ran for 39 performances.

Turner was placed on the payroll at MGM by Louis B. Mayer in the 1930s, but was limited in the assignments offered. She mostly played bit or small parts and worked as an extra.

== Last years ==
She later moved to the Motion Picture Country House, a retirement community for the industry in Woodland Hills, California.

After appearing in more than 160 motion pictures, Turner died at the age of 61 in Woodland Hills. She was cremated at a mortuary in Hollywood and, at her request, there was no funeral service. Her ashes are stored in vault 1 at Chapel of the Pines Crematory.

== Film appearances ==
- How to Cure a Cold (1907, Short)
- Athletic American Girls (1907, Short)
- Bargain Fiend; or, Shopping à la Mode (1907, Short)
- Cast Up by the Sea (1907, Short)
- The Gypsy's Warning (1907, Short)
- Francesca di Rimini; or, The Two Brothers (1908, Short) as Francesca
- Macbeth (1908, Short) as Banquet Guest
- Romeo and Juliet (1908, Short)
- Romance of a War Nurse (1908, Short)
- Richard III (1908, Short)
- Ex-Convict No. 900 (1908, Short)
- An Unexpected Santa Claus (1908, Short)
- Saved by Love (1908, Short) as The Banker's Daughter
- The Merchant of Venice (1908, Short) as Jessica
- A Daughter of the Sun (1909, Short)
- A Midsummer Night's Dream (1909, Short)
- Kenilworth (1909, Short)
- King Lear (1909, Short) as Goneril
- Fuss and Feathers (1909, Short)
- Launcelot and Elaine (1909, Short) as Elaine
- The Heart of a Clown (1909, Short)
- A Pair of Schemers; or, My Wife and My Uncle (1910, Short) as The Wife
- Twelfth Night (1910, Short) as Viola
- Ranson's Folly (1910, Short)
- For Her Sister's Sake (1910, Short)
- St. Elmo (1910, Short) as Edna Earle
- Sisters (1910, Short)
- Over the Garden Wall (1910, Short)
- Wilson's Wife's Countenance (1910, Short)
- Davy Jones and Captain Bragg (1910, Short)
- Uncle Tom's Cabin (1910, Short) as Topsy
- Peg Woffington (1910, Short) as Peg Woffington
- Her Mother's Wedding Gown (1910, Short) as The Daughter
- Back to Nature; or, The Best Man Wins (1910, Short) as The Consul's Daughter
- Rose Leaves (1910, Short)
- Jean the Match-Maker (1910, Short)
- Renunciation (1910, Short)
- Brother Man (1910, Short)
- Auld Robin Gray (1910, Short) as Jenny
- In the Mountains of Kentucky (1910, Short)
- Jean Goes Fishing (1910, Short)
- Francesca da Rimini (1910, Short) as Francesca da Rimini
- Love, Luck and Gasoline (1910, Short) as The Passenger
- The Winning of Miss Langdon (1910, Short) as Miss Langdon
- A Tin-Type Romance (1910, Short) as Beth
- A Dixie Mother (1910, Short)
- Jean Rescues (1911, Short) as Alice
- The New Stenographer (1911, Short) as The New Stenographer
- A Tale of Two Cities (1911, Short) as Lucie Manette
- Captain Barnacle's Courtship (1911, Short) as Ivy Leach
- For His Sake; or, The Winning of the Stepchildren (1911, Short) as The Wife
- The Spirit of the Light; or, Love Watches on Through the Years (1911, Short) as The Painter's Wife
- Prejudice of Pierre Marie (1911, Short) as Babette - Pierre's Wife
- The Show Girl (1911, Short) as Mrs. Renfrew
- The Sacrifice (1911, Short) as Mrs. Downes
- Proving His Love; or, The Ruse of a Beautiful Woman (1911, Short) as Alice Gordon
- The Stumbling Block (1911, Short) as Florence
- Intrepid Davy (1911, Short)
- Birds of a Feather (1911, Short) as Mrs. Sutherland
- The Wrong Patient (1911, Short) as Cissy Morgan
- The Thumb Print (1911, Short) as Minor Role (uncredited)
- Jealousy (1911, Short)
- Cherry Blossoms (1911, Short) as Dollie - the Absent-Minded Sweetheart
- Forgotten; or, An Answered Prayer (1911, Short) as Mrs. Earle - the Mother
- The Answer of the Roses (1911, Short) as Nina
- Wig Wag (1911, Short) as Mrs. Van Duyn - the Mother
- Auld Lang Syne (1911, Short) as Jennie
- Hypnotizing the Hypnotist (1911, Short)
- One Touch of Nature (1911, Short) as Helen Grochberg - the Jewish Daughter
- A Red Cross Martyr; or, On the Firing Lines of Tripoli (1912, Short) as Marie Petrini
- The Path of True Love (1912, Short) as The Country Girl
- Jean Intervenes (1912, Short) as Florence Hart
- Indian Romeo and Juliet (1912, Short) as Ethona / Juliet
- Mrs. Carter's Necklace (1912, Short)
- Her Diary (1912, Short) as Mrs. Swanson - a Widow
- Aunty's Romance (1912, Short) as Doris Myhtle
- Wanted... a Grandmother (1912, Short) as Kitty Mallory
- Flirt or Heroine (1912, Short) as Jean Harley
- Two Cinders (1912, Short) as Miss Scott
- The Loyalty of Sylvia (1912, Short) as Sylvia
- A Vitagraph Romance (1912, Short) as Herself
- The Irony of Fate (1912, Short) as Virginia Jameson
- She Cried (1912, Short) as Mame
- When Persistency and Obstinacy Meet (1912, Short) as Dorothy Ellis
- The Face or the Voice (1912, Short) as Myna Borden
- Una of the Sierras (1912, Short)
- The Servant Problem; or, How Mr. Bullington Ran the House (1912, Short) as Mrs. Fanny Bullington
- Susie to Susanne (1912, Short) as Susie / Susanne
- The Signal of Distress (1912, Short) as Dolly Dillard
- While She Powdered Her Nose (1912, Short) as Betty Thompson
- The Wings of a Moth (1913, Short) as Alice Wentworth
- What a Change of Clothes Did (1913, Short)
- Everybody's Doing It (1913, Short) as Grace Williams
- Cutey and the Twins (1913, Short) as The Twins' Mother
- The Skull (1913, Short) as Mrs. Jordan
- Stenographer's Troubles (1913, Short) as The Boss's Wife
- Under the Make-Up (1913, Short) as Pierrette
- The One Good Turn (1913, Short) as The Anarchist's Wife
- Sisters All (1913, Short) as Olga - a Poor Russian Dressmaker
- The House in Suburbia (1913, Short) as June Trowbridge
- Checkmated (1913, Short) as Betty Bartlett
- Let 'Em Quarrel (1913, Short) as Maude - the Wife
- A Window on Washington Park (1913, Short) as The Old Man's Daughter
- The Deerslayer (1913, Short) as Hettty Hutter
- Counsellor Bobby (1913, Short) as Jenny Holliday - the Daughter
- Up and Down the Ladder (1913, Short) as Luella Pears
- The Rose of Surrey (1913, Short) as Rose Moore
- Jean's Evidence (1913, Short)
- Pumps (1913, Short) as Mary Carter
- The Younger Sister (1913, Short) as Peggy Wright
- The Harper Mystery (1913, Short) as Margaret Kent
- Creatures of Habit (1914, Short) as Flo
- The Murdoch Trial (1914) as Helen Story
- Flotilla the Flirt (1914, Short) as Flotilla
- Daisy Doodad's Dial (1914, Short) as Daisy Doodad
- For Her People (1914, Short) as Joan
- Through the Valley of Shadows (1914) as Alice Cross
- The Shepherd Lassie of Argyle (1914, Short) as Mary Lachan
- Shopgirls: or, The Great Question (1914) as Judith
- As Ye Repent (1915) as Marea
- My Old Dutch (1915) as Sal Gray
- Alone in London (1915) as Nan Meadows
- Lost and Won (1915) as Barbar Weston
- Far from the Madding Crowd (1915) as Bathsheba Everdene
- A Welsh Singer (1915) as Mifanwy
- Doorsteps (1916) as Doorsteps
- Grim Justice (1916) as Chrystal Transom
- East Is East (1916) as Victoria Vickers
- Fool's Gold (1919) as Constance Harvey
- Oh, It's E.Z. (1919, Short)
- The Brand of Lopez (1920) as Lola Castillo
- The Ugly Duckling (1920) as Charmis Graham
- Blackmail (1920) as Lena
- Three Men in a Boat (1920)
- Passion Fruit (1921) as Nuanua
- All Dolled Up (1921) as Eva Bundy
- The Old Wives' Tale (1921) as Constance Barnes
- The Little Mother (1922) as The Mother
- The Street Tumblers (1922, Short) as Gypsy
- The Lights o' London (1922, Short)
- Was She Justified? (1922) as Joan Crossby
- Hornet's Nest (1923) as Mrs. Cobb
- Sally Bishop (1924) as Janet
- The Boatswain's Mate (1924, Short) as Mrs. Walters
- Women and Diamonds (1924) as Mrs. Seaton
- Janice Meredith (1924) as Maid (uncredited)
- The Mad Marriage (1925)
- Never the Twain Shall Meet (1925) as Julia
- The Price of Success (1925) as Mrs. Moran
- The Dark Angel (1925) as Roma
- The Gilded Highway (1926) as Mrs. Welby
- The Last Alarm (1926) as Warehouse proprietor's wife
- Flame of the Argentine (1926) as Doña Aguila
- Padlocked (1926) as Mrs. Gilbert
- The Overland Stage (1927) as Alice Gregg
- The Broken Gate (1927) as Miss Julia
- College (1927) as A Mother
- Stranded (1927) as Mrs. Simpson
- The Cancelled Debt (1927) as Mrs. Burke
- Sally in Our Alley (1927) as Mrs. Williams
- The Chinese Parrot (1927) as Mrs. Phillmore
- The Law and the Man (1928) as Miss Blair
- Marry the Girl (1928) as Miss Lawson
- The Road to Ruin (1928) as Mrs. Canfield
- Walking Back (1928) as Mrs. Schuyler (uncredited)
- Jazzland (1928) as Mrs. Baggott
- The Pace That Kills (1928) as Mrs. Bradley
- Kid's Clever (1929) as Matron
- The Iron Mask (1929) as Abbess (uncredited)
- The Rampant Age (1930) as Mrs. Lawrence
- King of Jazz (1930) as Minor (uncredited)
- The Ridin' Fool (1931) as Ma Warren
- Taxi (1931) as Trial Spectator (uncredited)
- The Trial of Vivienne Ware (1932) as Juror (uncredited)
- The Sign of the Cross (1932) as Christian (uncredited)
- The Animal Kingdom (1932) as Minor Role (uncredited)
- He Couldn't Take It (1933) as Elderly Lady (uncredited)
- One Rainy Afternoon (1936) as Minor Role (uncredited)
- Thousands Cheer (1943) as Mother at Train Station (uncredited)
- Whistling in Brooklyn (1943) as Baseball Fan (uncredited; final film role)

== Other film credits ==
- Through the Valley of Shadows (1914), Scenario
- A Welsh Singer (1915), Producer
- As Ye Repent (1915), Story
- Caste (1915), Producer
- Far from the Madding Crowd (1915), Producer
- The Great Adventure (1915), Producer
- Grim Justice (1916), Producer
- Sally in Our Alley (1916), Producer
