= My Old Dutch =

"My Old Dutch" may refer to:

- "My Old Dutch" (song), an 1892 song by Albert Chevalier
- My Old Dutch (1915 film), a film starring Albert Chevalier and Florence Turner
- My Old Dutch (1926 film), a film starring May McAvoy and Pat O'Malley
- My Old Dutch (1934 film), a film starring Betty Balfour and Gordon Harker

== See also ==
- My Old Duchess, a 1934 British comedy film
