= Charles Ingle =

English composer

Auguste Charles Joseph Onesime Chevalier (28 September 1862 – 24 February 1940), known as Charles Ingle, was an English composer. Ingle was the brother and manager of performer Albert Chevalier. Ingle was one of six children. He had two brothers, Albert and Bertram; and a sister, Adéle. The two other children died in infancy. Their father, Jean Onesime Chevalier, was born in France.

== Name ==
Ingle assumed his pseudonym during a touring trip to Ireland, when one member of the party gave his name as Sir Charles Ingle in a "spirit of waggery". The name was then used on the prestigious guest list at their stop in Dublin and later that evening by composer Bond Andrews. Ingle later commented that Andrew's use of the name (and the fictitious "Lady Ingle") made the pseudonym pass bona fide to that evening's guests. He did, however, comment that the "haunting fear of untimely discovery made [him] vow never to pose as a knight again".

== Career ==
Ingle composed music for many of his brother's comedic music hall songs, including "Wot Cher! Knocked 'em in the Old Kent Road" (1891) and "My Old Dutch" (1892).

As well as managing and composing for his brother, Ingle performed alongside Albert. On 24 January 1876, Ingle portrayed Squire O'Grady in an adaptation of Samuel Lover's Handy Andy, despite the fact that he "didn't know a line of the part".

While managing Chevalier, Ingle was responsible for booking concert tours and would often book performances up to four months in advance. Chevalier would rarely play more than two shows in one town, but would tour for up to six months at a time. Chevalier began his first tour of the United States on 23 March 1896 at the Koster and Bails music hall in New York City, and continued touring the US for three years.
