= Heidi (1937 film) =

1937 film by Allan Dwan

- Promotional Poster
- Directed by: Allan Dwan
- Screenplay by: Julien Josephson; Walter Ferris
- Based on: Heidi; 1880 children's book by Johanna Spyri
- Produced by: Raymond Griffith (associate producer)
- Starring: Shirley Temple; Jean Hersholt; Arthur Treacher; Helen Westley; Pauline Moore; Thomas Beck; Mary Nash; Sidney Blackmer; Mady Christians
- Cinematography: Arthur Miller
- Edited by: Allen McNeil
- Music by: David Buttolph; Charles Maxwell; Ernst Toch
- Distributed by: Twentieth Century-Fox Film Corporation
- Release date: October 15, 1937
- Running time: 88 minutes
- Country: United States
- Language: English

Heidi is a 1937 American musical drama film directed by Allan Dwan and written by Julien Josephson and Walter Ferris, loosely based on Johanna Spyri's 1880 children's book of the same name. The film stars Shirley Temple as the titular orphan, who is taken from her grandfather to live as a companion to Klara, a spoiled, disabled girl. It was a success, and Temple enjoyed her third consecutive year as number one box office draw.

This was first of two films pairing Shirley Temple with Marcia Mae Jones, Mary Nash and Arthur Treacher; the other was The Little Princess (1939).

== Plot ==
Heidi is an eight-year-old Swiss orphan who is given by her aunt Dete to her mountain-dwelling hermit grandfather, Adolph. While Adolph behaves coolly toward her at first, her cheery nature turns him warm and sees him open up to the nearby town.

Heidi is then stolen back by her aunt, to live in the wealthy Sesemann household in Frankfurt am Main as a companion to Klara, a sheltered, disabled girl in a wheelchair who is constantly watched by the strict Fräulein Rottenmeier. The local pastor runs into the aunt and Heidi before they leave, and hears that Heidi is being taken to Frankfurt; he relays the information to her grandfather, who begins searching for her. Heidi is unhappy but makes the best of the situation, always longing for her grandfather.

Klara's doting father Herr Sesemann visits at Christmas, and when Klara shows him she can walk again, he offers Heidi a home, but she says she wishes to go home to her grandfather. Sesemann refuses, later telling Klara that Heidi's aunt explained Heidi's grandfather is a brutal man and she will be better off with them. Rottenmeier (who wants to keep Klara dependent upon her) is fired by Herr Sesemann when he sees her being cruel to Heidi, and she tries to get rid of her by selling her to the gypsies, but she is stopped by Heidi's grandfather. She lies to the police who arrive, saying he has stolen her child. A pursuit takes place, but Heidi explains he is her grandfather and Rottenmeier was trying to sell her to the gypsies. She tells the police that Herr Sesemann can verify her story, and the next scene shows Heidi and her grandfather reunited on the mountain, with Herr Sesemann and Klara visiting.

== Cast ==
=== Opening credits ===
- Shirley Temple as Heidi
- Jean Hersholt as Adolph Kramer
- Arthur Treacher as Andrews
- Helen Westley as Blind Anna
- Thomas Beck as Pastor Schultz
- Mary Nash as Fräulein Rottenmeier
- Sidney Blackmer as Sesemann
- and Pauline Moore
- Mady Christians
- Marcia Mae Jones
- Delmar Watson
- Egon Brecher
- Christian Rub
- George Humbert

=== End credits ===
- Shirley Temple as Heidi
- Jean Hersholt as Adolph Kramer
- Arthur Treacher as Andrews
- Helen Westley as Blind Anna
- Pauline Moore as Elsa
- Thomas Beck as Pastor Schultz
- Mary Nash as Fräulein Rottenmeier
- Sidney Blackmer as Sesemann
- Mady Christians as Dete
- Marcia Mae Jones as Klara Sesemann
- Delmar Watson as Peter
- Egon Brecher as Inn Keeper
- George Humbert as Organ Grinder
- Sig Rumann as Police Captain

== Production ==
Midway through the shooting of the film, the dream sequence was added into the script. There were reports that Temple was behind the dream sequence and that she was enthusiastically pushing for it, but in her autobiography she vehemently denied this. Her contract gave neither her nor her parents any creative control over the films she was in. While she enjoyed the opportunity to wear braids and to be lifted on high wire, she saw this as the collapse of any serious attempt by the studio to build upon the dramatic role from the previous film Wee Willie Winkie.

During the scene where Temple's character gets butted by the goat, she initially did the scene herself while completely padded up. After a few takes, however, her mother stepped in and insisted that a double be used. One of the extras, a boy, was dressed up to look like her. The boy's father was so upset over him doubling for a girl that he prohibited him from ever acting again. The double, who was not named, would later share diplomatic duties with Temple in Africa. Temple also had trouble milking the goat. To remedy this, Dwan had a flexible piece of tubing installed in such a way as to make it look as if the goat was being milked.

During the making of the film, director Dwan had new badges made for the Shirley Temple Police Force. This was an informal group thought up by Temple in 1935, which was, as she described, "an organized system of obligations from whomever I was able to shanghai into membership." Every child wore one after swearing allegiance and obedience to 'Chief' Temple. Everyone on the set was soon wearing badges with Temple strutting about giving orders to the crew such as "Take that set down and build me a castle." They went along with the game.

Temple made one other film in 1937, Wee Willie Winkie. The child actress was growing older, and the studio was questioning how much longer she could keep playing "cute" roles when Heidi was filmed, but she retained her position as number one at the box office for the third year in a row.

== Reception ==
Contemporary reviews were generally positive. Frank S. Nugent wrote that the film "contains all the harmless sweetness and pretty pictures one expects to find on the juvenile shelf," and found the supporting cast "quite up to Miss Temple's demanding standard." Variety gave the cast "more than a modicum of credit for making the picture what it is" and singled out Hersholt as "excellent." Harrison's Reports called it "a charming picture" that was "filled with human appeal." "Shirley Temple's latest picture is one of her best," reported Film Daily. "In every way, the picture is grand entertainment with its sweet sentiment, and its socko hilarity is ever a source of rollicking laughter." The Lewiston Evening Journal wrote that Temple had never been given "a more captivating role than that of Heidi," adding, "The story is of the old-fashioned type but we accept it uncritically with its improbabilities, its hectic race at the end, its tears, its laughter - it is so very human in its appeal." John Mosher of The New Yorker was less enthusiastic, writing, "There seems something rather musty and familiar about most of the predicaments in this movie."

== Rights ==
On March 20, 2019, Rupert Murdoch sold most of 21st Century Fox's film and television assets to Disney, and Heidi was one of the films included in the deal.

== See also ==
- Shirley Temple filmography

== Sources ==
- Windeler, Robert (1992) [1978], The Films of Shirley Temple, New York: Carol Publishing Group
