= Wot Cher! Knocked 'em in the Old Kent Road =

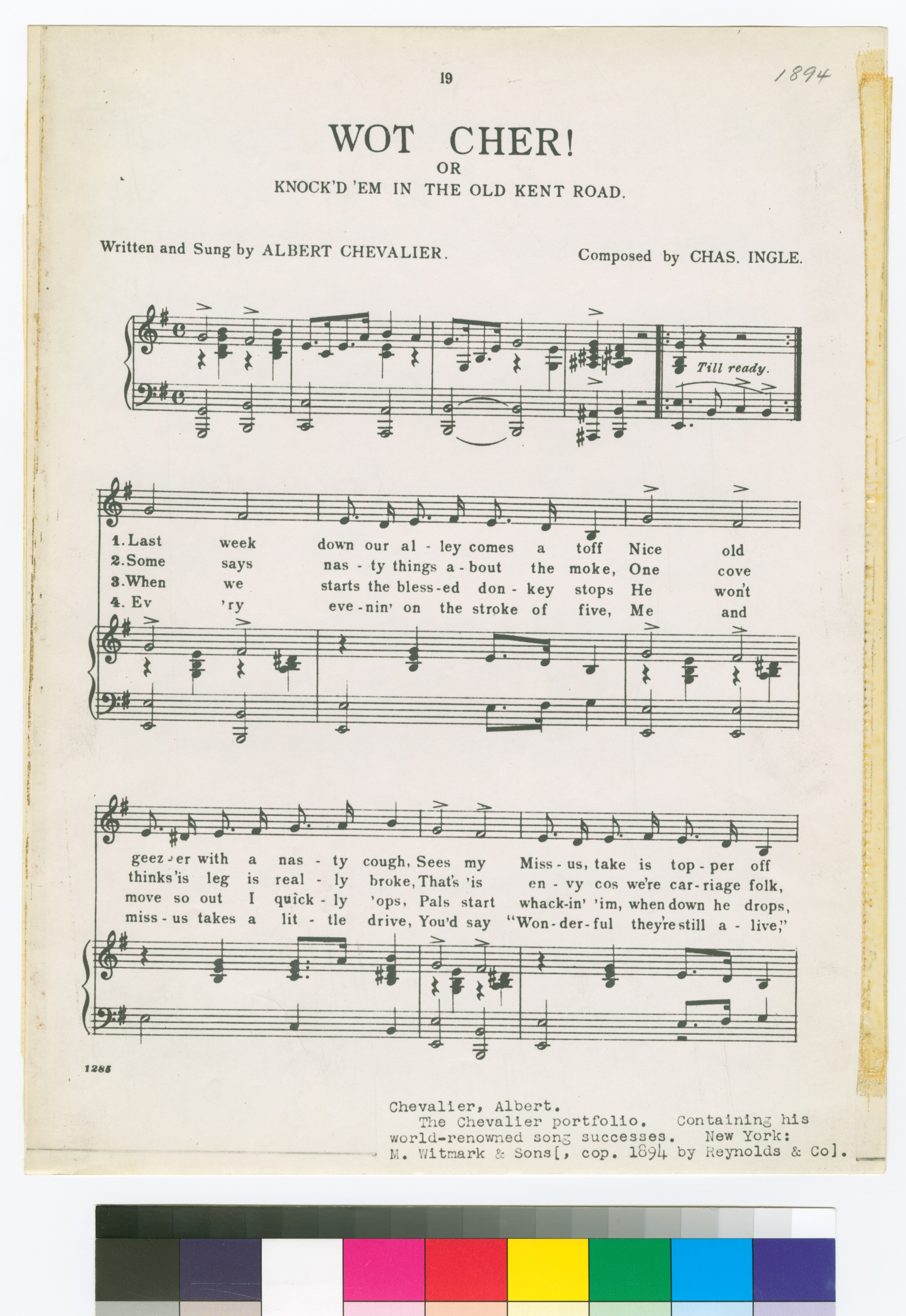

Song
- Released: 1891
- Genre: novelty
- Songwriters: Albert Chevalier, Charles Ingle

"Wot Cher! Knocked 'em in the Old Kent Road" is a British music hall comedy song written in 1891 by the actor and singer Albert Chevalier. The score was by his brother and manager Charles Ingle. Chevalier developed a stage persona as the archetypal Cockney and was a celebrated variety artist, with the nickname of "The Singing Costermonger". When first performed it was known simply as "Wot Cher!" The song describes the sudden endowment of apparent wealth on a poor family.

The song's verse is in a minor key, and then the chorus moves into the relative major.

It was sung and danced to by Shirley Temple and Arthur Treacher in the 1939 film The Little Princess. It is performed by street minstrels in the "Limehouse Blues" segment of the 1945 film Ziegfeld Follies. An abridged version was sung by Fozzie Bear, who uncharacteristically succeeded in entertaining Statler and Waldorf, on an episode of The Muppet Show.

== Meaning ==
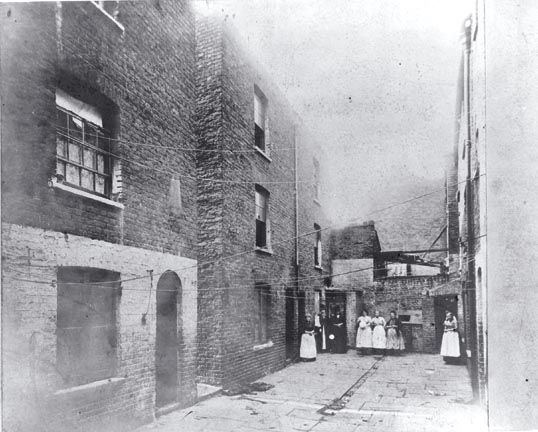
A London alley contemporary with the song - Boundary Street 1890

The song is full of working-class cockney rhyming slang and idiomatic phrasing.

The song tells the story of Bill and his wife who, with a lodger, live down an alleyway off the street (which were usually passages lined with crowded tenements), near the Old Kent Road, one of the poorest districts in London. They are visited by a toff, a well-dressed man, who must have been a gentleman because he took his topper (top hat) off in the presence of the narrator's missus (wife). The man's speech however betrays that he is lower class himself when he informs the lady that her uncle Tom has 'popped off', slang for died. He says this is not a 'sell' i.e. it's the truth not a story, and that she has been left a little donkey shay (a small, light, horse-drawn carriage).

The refrain describes the reaction of the neighbours to the news of the couple's good fortune. "Wot cher!" was a Cockney greeting—a contraction of "What cheer", used as a greeting since the Middle Ages. To "knock em" is an idiomatic phrase, to knock them on the head i.e. to stun them.

The song goes on to describe the initial unreliability of the moke (slang for donkey) and the way the couple use it to impress the neighbourhood by doing the "grand", behaving in a grandiose way as if they were "carriage folk", a family who could afford to own their own carriage, and who might drive a "four-in-'and", a carriage with four horses, in Rotten Row, one of the most fashionable horse rides in London.

A "cove" is a low-class fellow. A "Dutch" is a wife, being cockney rhyming slang for "Duchess of Fife" which rhymes with "wife". She says "I 'ates a Bus because it's low!", in order to tease her lodger, meaning she now considers the bus to be low-class and beneath her.

== Lyrics ==
Last week down our alley came a toff
Nice old geezer with a nasty cough.
Sees my missus, takes his topper off
In a very gentlemanly way!
"Ma'am" says he, "I 'ave some news to tell,
Your rich uncle Tom of Camberwell,
Popp'd off recent, which it ain't a sell,
Leaving you 'is little donkey shay."

Refrain:

"Wot cher!" all the neighbours cried,
"Who yer gonna meet, Bill
Have yer bought the street, Bill?"
Laugh! I thought I should 'ave died
Knock'd 'em in the Old Kent Road!

Some says nasty things about the moke,
One cove thinks 'is leg is really broke.
That's his envy cos we're carriage folk,
Like the toffs as rides in Rotten Row!
Straight! It woke the alley up a bit,
Thought our lodger would 'ave 'ad a fit,
When my missus who's a real wit
Says "I 'ates a Bus because it's low!"

Refrain

When we starts the blessed donkey stops
He won't move, so out I quickly 'ops
Pals start whackin' 'm, when down 'e drops
Someone says 'e wasn't made to go.
Lor, it might have been a four-in-'and,
My old Dutch knows 'ow to do the grand
First she bows, and then she waves 'er 'and,
Callin' out "We're goin' for a blow!"

Refrain

Ev'ry evenin' at the stroke of five
Me and the missus takes a little drive.
You'd say, "Wonderful they're still alive"
If you saw that little donkey go.
I soon showed 'im that 'ed 'ave to do
Just whatever 'e was wanted to,
Still I sha'nt forget that rowdy crew,
'Ollerin' "Woa! steady! Neddy woa!"

Refrain
