= Pauline Moore =

American actress (1914–2001)

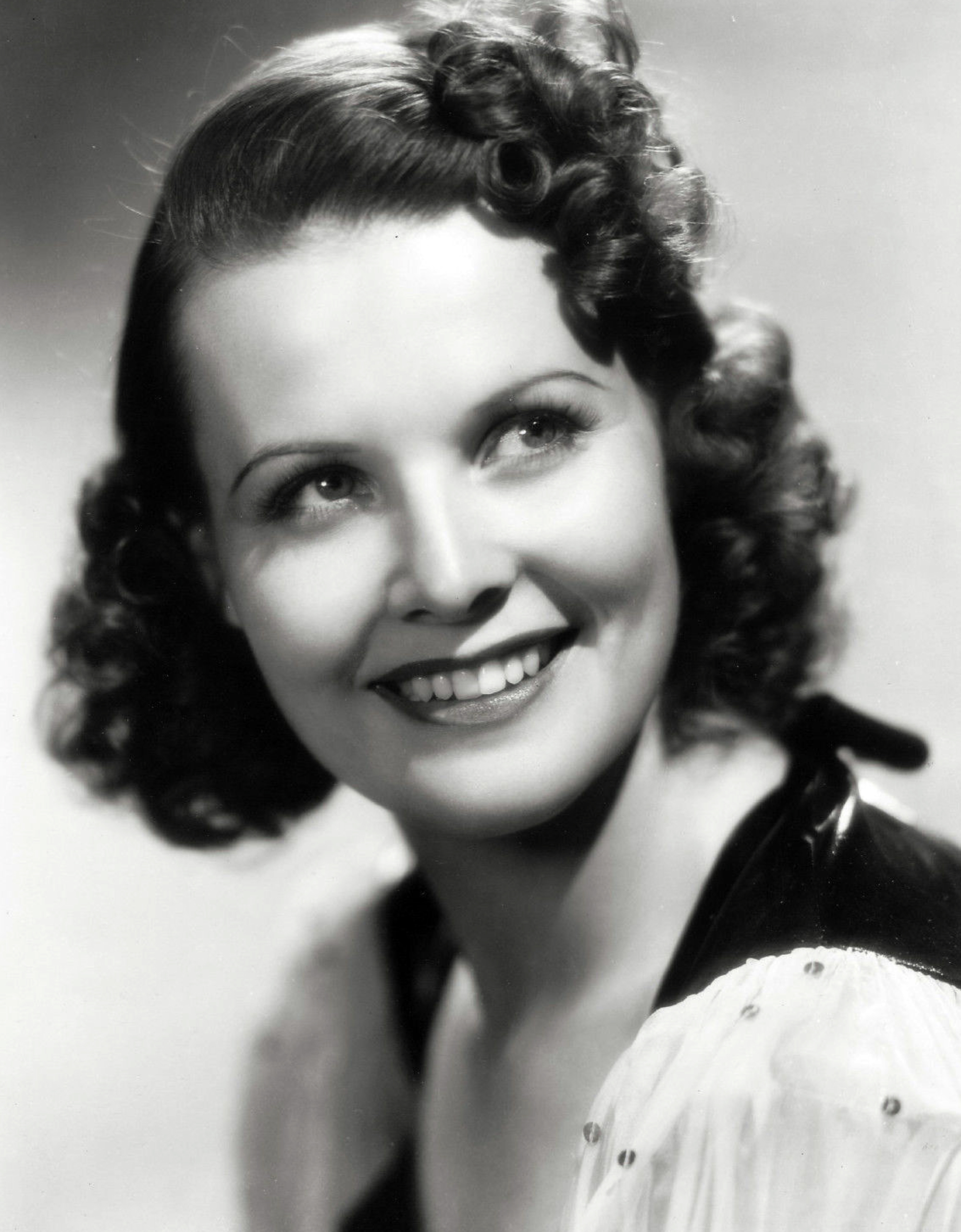
- Pauline Moore, 1938
- Born: Pauline Joless Love; June 17, 1914; Harrisburg, Pennsylvania, US
- Died: December 7, 2001 (aged 87); Sequim, Washington, US
- Occupations: Actress, model
- Years active: 1931–58
- Known for: Young Mr. Lincoln; Colorado; The Three Musketeers; Heidi; Five of a Kind; Days of Jesse James; Charlie Chan at the Olympics
- Spouses: Jefferson Machamer (m. 1934–1960) (his death) Dodd Watkins (m. 1962–1971) (his death)
- Children: 3

Pauline Moore (born Pauline Joless Love; June 17, 1914 – December 7, 2001) was an American actress known for her roles in Western and B movies during the 1930s and 1940s.

== Early years ==
Moore was born in Harrisburg, Pennsylvania. After her father died during World War I, her mother remarried in 1925 and Moore took her stepfather's name. She attended Darlington Seminary in West Chester, Pennsylvania, and William Penn High School in Harrisburg.

== Career ==
The Edna Preston stock theater company gave Moore her first professional acting opportunity. She moved to Hollywood in the early 1930s, and also starred on Broadway and worked as a model. Broadway plays in which she appeared included Dance With Your Gods (1934), Murder at the Vanities (1933), The Prisoner (1927), The Fountain (1925), Man and the Masses (1924), and The Easiest Way (1921).

From the late 1930s through the early 1940s, Moore made 24 films for 20th Century Fox, with whom she was contracted. Her film debut came in Frankenstein (1931).

She later worked for Republic Pictures, starring in four Roy Rogers westerns, as well as the film King of the Texas Rangers in 1940, starring football great Sammy Baugh. Moore starred in three Charlie Chan films, starring alongside Cesar Romero, Allan Lane, and Kane Richmond. She also starred alongside Shirley Temple in the 1937 film Heidi, and alongside Henry Fonda in the 1939 film Young Mr. Lincoln.

From her first uncredited role in 1931 through to her last role in 1958, Moore's career spanned a total of 30 films. She made a few television appearances in the 1950s, including a bit part in Spoilers of the Forest in 1957 alongside Rod Cameron and Vera Ralston, but for the most part her acting career had ended, by her own choice.

== Personal life ==
Moore was married to the cartoonist Jefferson Machamer from 1934 until his death in 1960. They had three children. In 1962, she married Rev. Dodd Watkins, whose death in 1972 left her a widow for the second time.

== Death ==
On December 7, 2001, Moore died of Lou Gehrig's disease at a nursing home in Sequim, Washington. She was 87.

== Filmography ==
- Frankenstein (1931) – Bridesmaid (uncredited)
- Wagon Wheels (1934) – Young Lady (uncredited)
- Love Is News (1937) – Lois Westcott
- Comic Artist's Home Life (1937, Short) – Mrs. Jefferson Machamer
- Charlie Chan at the Olympics (1937) – Betty Adams
- Born Reckless (1937) – Dorothy Collins
- Wild and Woolly (1937) – Ruth Morris
- Heidi (1937) – Elsa
- Three Blind Mice (1938) – Elizabeth Charters
- Passport Husband (1938) – Mary Jane Clayton
- Five of a Kind (1938) – Elinor Kingsley
- The Arizona Wildcat (1939) – Caroline Reed
- The Three Musketeers (1939) – Lady Constance
- Young Mr. Lincoln (1939) – Ann Rutledge
- Charlie Chan in Reno (1939) – Mary Whitman
- Charlie Chan at Treasure Island (1939) – Eve Cairo
- Days of Jesse James (1939) – Mary Whittaker
- Young Buffalo Bill (1940) – Tonia Regas
- The Carson City Kid (1940) – Joby Madison
- Colorado (1940) – Lylah Sanford
- The Trail Blazers (1940) – Marcia Kelton
- Arkansas Judge (1940) – Margaret Weaver
- Double Cross (1941) – Ellen Bronson
- King of the Texas Rangers (1941, Serial) – Sally Crane
- Studio 57 (1954, TV Series) – Mrs. Boche
- Medic (1955, TV Series) – Ella Sommers
- The Shrike (1955) – Author's Wife (uncredited)
- Cavalcade of America (1955, TV Series) – Esta Cody
- Producers' Showcase (1956 TV series) Wendy
- TV Reader's Digest (1955–1956, TV Series) – Wendy (grown up) / Jane
- Showdown at Abilene (1956) – Wife (uncredited)
- Spoilers of the Forest (1957) – Hysterical Woman (uncredited)
- The Littlest Hobo (1958) – Nurse (final film role)
