= Kathleen O'Malley =

American actress (1924–2019)

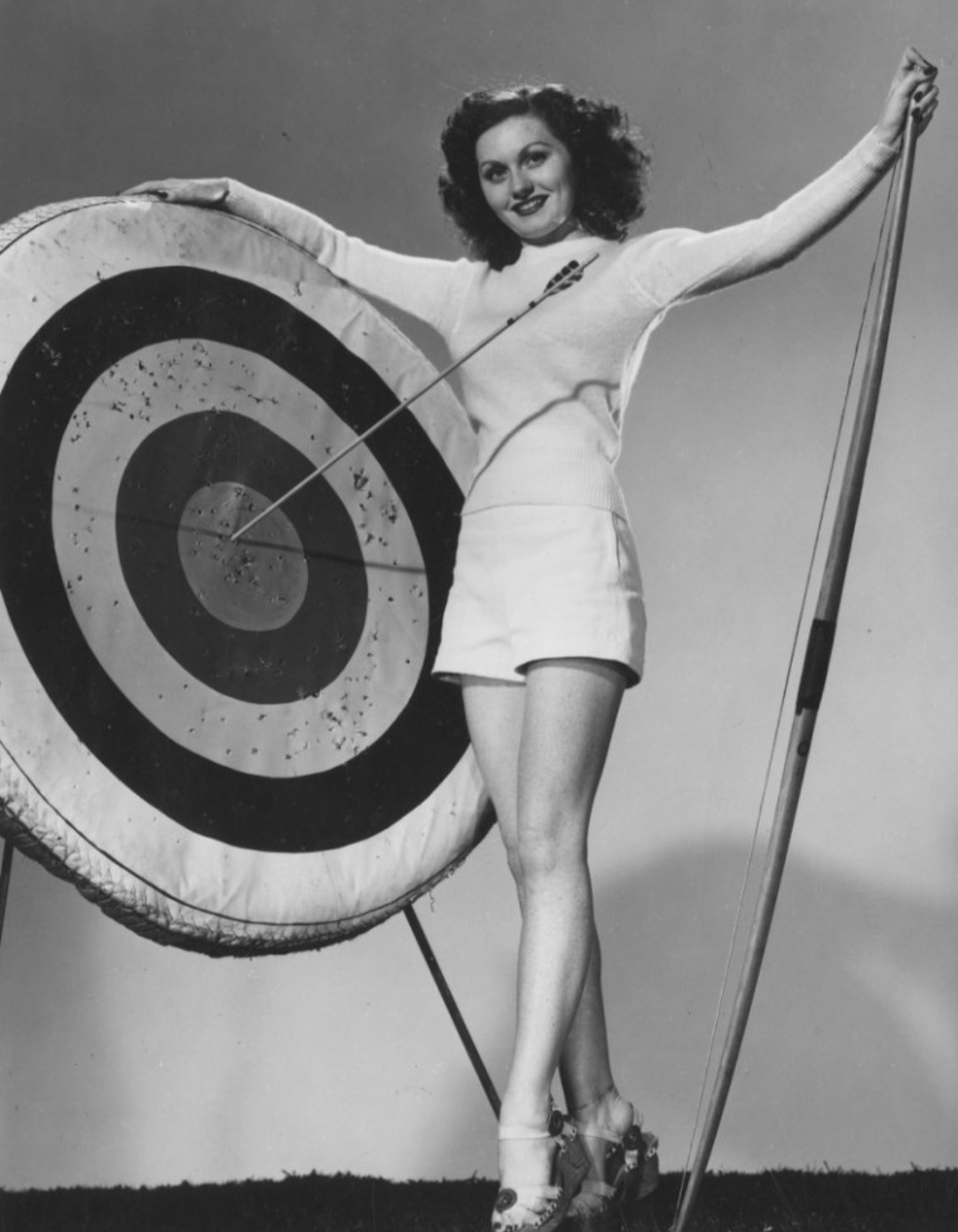
- O'Malley in 1944
- Born: Mary Kathleen O'Malley; March 31, 1924; Worcester, Massachusetts, U.S.
- Died: February 25, 2019 (aged 94)
- Occupation: Actress
- Years active: 1926–1998
- Spouse: James Maloney (m. 1954; died 1994)
- Children: 2
- Parent: Pat O'Malley (father)

Mary Kathleen O'Malley (March 31, 1924 – February 25, 2019) was an American film and television actress, who was the daughter of vaudevillian and actor Pat O'Malley. Her screen debut came during the silent film era as a thirteen month old baby in 1926, when she appeared alongside her father and her sister Sheila in the western My Old Dutch.

O'Malley went on to appear in several films and television shows during a seven decade career, including Cover Girl, Lady on a Train, Two Tickets to Broadway, Gunsmoke, Maverick, Rawhide, Leave it to Beaver and General Hospital. O'Malley also appeared in the second season of Barnaby Jones; episode titled, "Blind Terror" (09/16/1973). Her last acting credit came in 1998 when she appeared in the short-lived American crime drama Buddy Faro.

== Early life ==
O'Malley was born in Worcester, Massachusetts, to vaudevillian, stage and film actor Pat O'Malley. She made her screen debut at age 13 months in the film My Old Dutch, starring her father and including her older sister Sheila. It was released the following year in 1926. All three sisters (Eileen, Sheila & Kathleen) worked in show business as children.

== Career ==
=== 1940s ===
In 1943, she played the part of a college girl in the Vincent Sherman-directed film Old Acquaintance which starred Bette Davis, Miriam Hopkins and Gig Young. The following year she was in the Charles Vidor directed Cover Girl, a film about a night club owner who was in love with a dancing girl who has other ambitions. In it she played the cigarette girl. The main stars of the film were Rita Hayworth and Gene Kelly. In November 1944, she appeared in the November 23 issue of the Sarasota Herald Tribune, pictured with a small caption "The Most Delightful Target for Our Bomb Sights." She was chosen by bombardiers of the US Army Air Forces. In 1947 she played the part of Dolly in the Alexander Hall-directed musical fantasy Down to Earth, which again starred Hayworth and Roland Culver. In 1949 she played the part of Nita in Ladies of the Chorus which starred Marilyn Monroe, Adele Jergens and Rand Brooks.

=== 1950s ===
O'Malley had a prominent role in John Ford's 1950 film, Wagon Master. She played the part of pretty Mormon girl Prudence Perkins. Her character Prudence creates an issue due to presumably marrying Sandy instead of young Mormon man Jackson. Prudence is also the probable cause of a fight between the two men who are both pursuing her. In 1952, she appeared as Mrs. Norton, a pilot's wife in the Tay Garnett Korean war film One Minute to Zero which starred Robert Mitchum and Ann Blyth.

== Death ==
O'Malley died of Alzheimer's disease on February 25, 2019, at age 94.

== Personal life ==
O'Malley was married to James Maloney who was also her agent. The couple had two children: Sean (b. 1958) and Darren (b. 1960). Maloney died on March 23, 1994.

== Selected filmography ==
=== Early years ===
Film
Year	Title	Role	Notes
1926	My Old Dutch	Herbert Brown, infant	
1943	Old Acquaintance	College girl	
1944	Cover Girl	Cigarette Girl	
1945	Salome Where She Danced	Salome girl	
1945	Sudan	Handmaiden / Girl	
1945	Lady on a Train	Photographer	
1945	This Love of Ours	Chorus Girl	
1946	Gallant Journey	Mary	
1946	Devotion	Girl	
1946	Night in Paradise	Palace maiden	
1947	Down to Earth	Dolly	
1948	A-Hunting They Did Go	Girl	
1949	French Fried Frolic	Mabel Brown	
1950	Watch the Birdie	Woman Who Undresses	
1950	Wagon Master	Prudence Perkins	
1950	Shadow on the Wall	Telephone Operator	
1950	Hugs and Mugs	Ella	The Three Stooges series
1951	Two Tickets to Broadway	Showgirl	
1952	The Merry Widow	Girl at Maxim's	
1952	Eight Iron Men	Girl in Daydream	
1952	Affair in Trinidad	Stewardess	
1953	Confidentially Connie	Nurse	
1954	Brigadoon	Girl with Milk Pails	
1954	Naked Alibi	Jean Jenkins	
1955	Mister Roberts	Nurse	

Television
Year	Title	Role	Notes
1963	The Alfred Hitchcock Hour	Valerie Anderson	Season 1 Episode 15: "The Thirty-First of February"
1964	The Munsters	The Wife	Episode "Tin-Can Man" (Nov 1964)

=== 1970s-1990s ===
Film
Year	Title	Role	Notes
1970	Airport	Mrs. Chuck Beale – Passenger	Uncredited
1971	Dirty Harry	Lady in Jaffe's cafe	Uncredited
1971	Minnie and Moskowitz		Uncredited
1973	Charley Varrick	Jessie	
1976	Amelia Earhart	Mrs Gallagher	2 part television series
1976	The Shootist	School Teacher	
1977	The Hunted Lady	Nurse	TV movie
1977	Telefon	Mrs. Maloney	
1978	The Toolbox Murders	Screamer Woman	
1979	Marciano	Supervisor	TV movie
1981	Isabel's Choice	Housekeeper	TV movie
1982	Jinxed!	Mother	
1996	Black Sheep	Mrs Oneacre	
