= Jefferson Machamer =

American cartoonist and illustrator

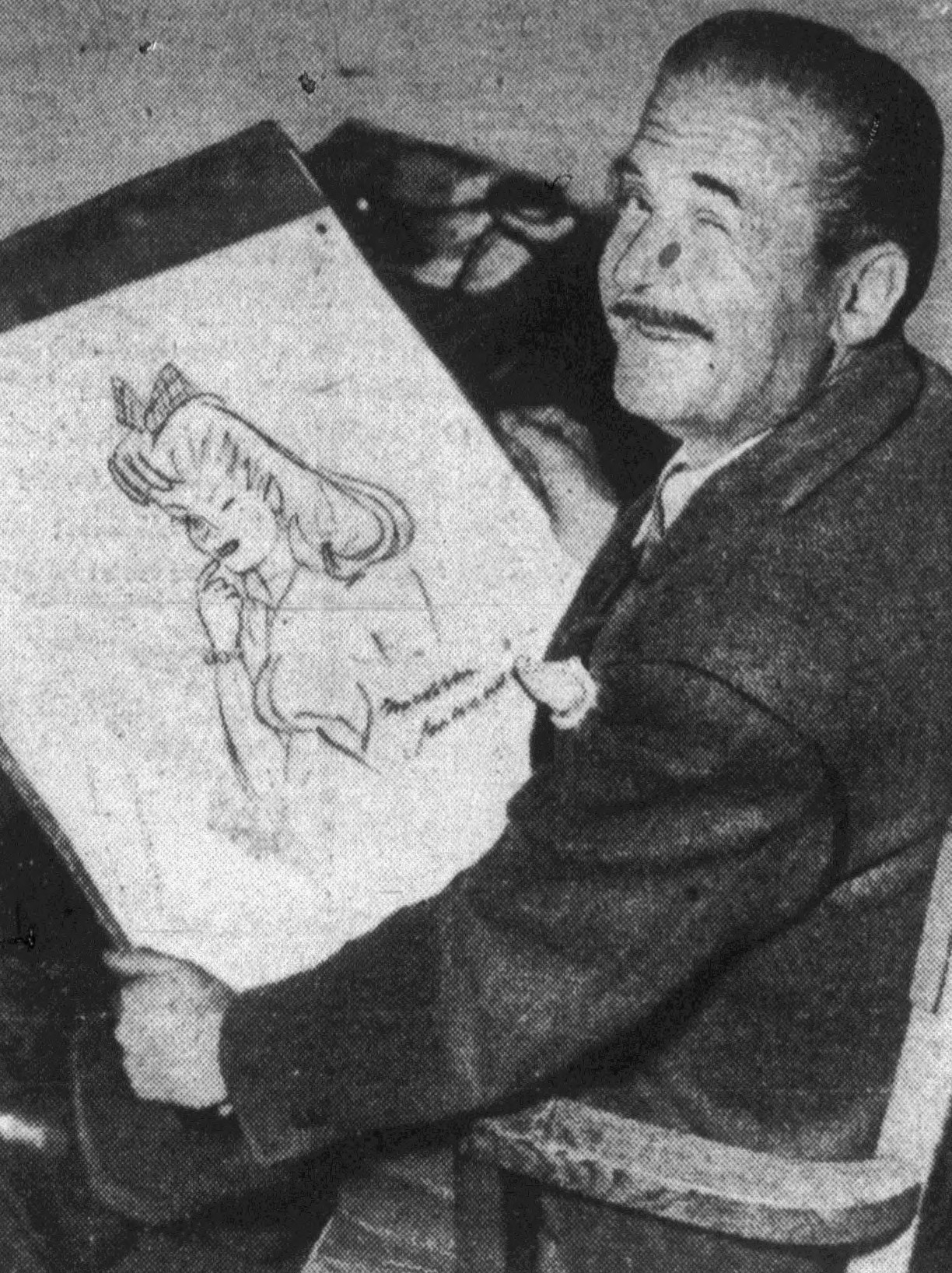
- Machamer c. 1946
- Born: 1900; Western Nebraska, U.S.
- Died: August 15, 1960 (aged 59–60); Santa Monica, California, U.S.
- Education: University of Nebraska
- Spouse: Pauline Moore (married 1934–1960)
- Children: 3

Thomas Jefferson Machamer (1900 – August 15, 1960) was an American cartoonist and illustrator known especially for his drawings of glamorous women. He also wrote and acted in a series of short comedy films in the 1930s.

== Career as an illustrator ==
After graduating from the University of Nebraska Machamer became a staff artist for The Kansas City Star newspaper. In 1922 he moved to New York City and joined the staff of the humor magazine Judge.

From 1928 until 1930 he wrote and drew a comic strip for King Features Syndicate called Petting Patty, initially as a daily strip and later also as a Sunday color feature. In 1932, his comic strip Gags and Gals made its debut in the New York Mirror. This strip proved a greater popular success, and ran until 1938. According to Dan Nadel, Gags and Gals displayed the elements that typified most of Machamer's work: "beautiful dominant women, broad shouldered and impeccably dressed, accompanied by hapless, unattractive men, sometimes short and mustachioed, with just a tuft of hair atop a bald pate—apparently a self portrait." Machamer's style has been compared to that of Russell Patterson, who may have influenced him.

In 1946, Machamer published a how-to book for aspiring cartoonists, Laugh and Draw with Jefferson Machamer. Beginning in the 1940s, he also operated a correspondence course from his home.

== Film work ==
Between 1936 and 1938, Machamer wrote and acted in a series of short comic films made by Educational Pictures, including Comic Artist's Home Life, Wanna Be a Model?, and Cute Crime.

== Personal life ==
Machamer was born in western Nebraska. From 1934 until his death he was married to the actress Pauline Moore, with whom he had three children.

Jefferson Machamer died in Santa Monica, California on August 15, 1960.

== Gallery ==
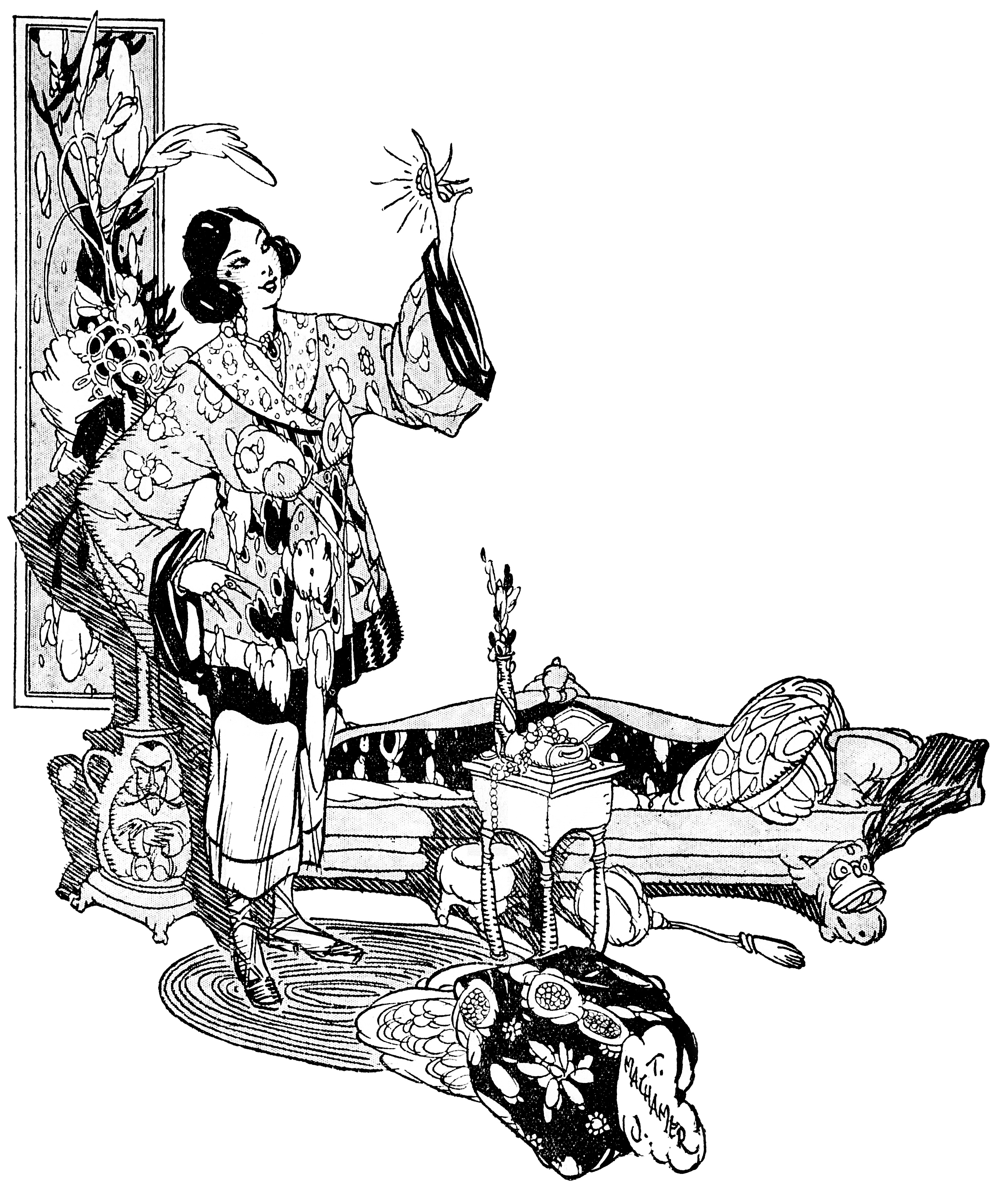
Illustration of Wang Lianying, 3 October 1920

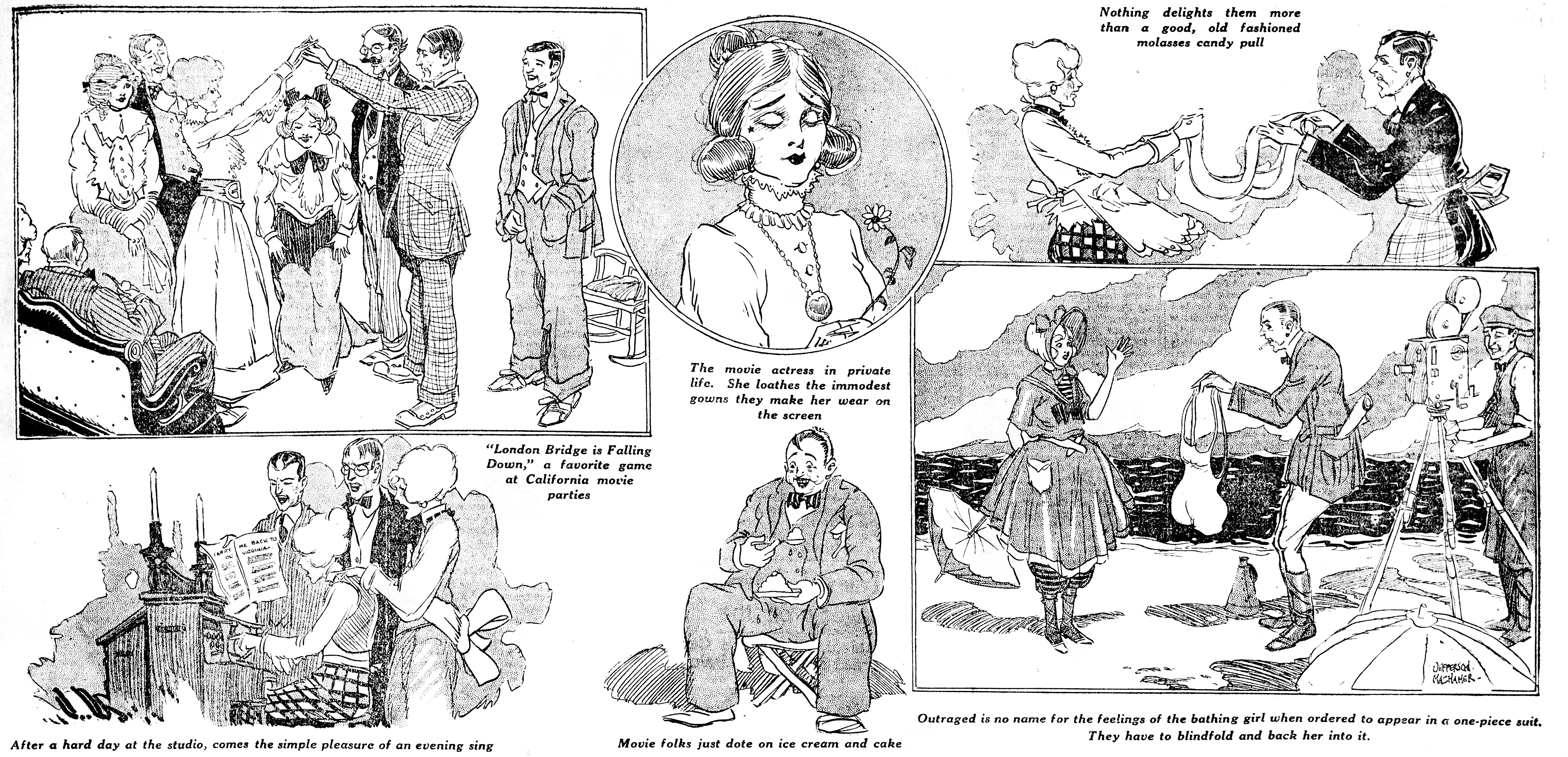
"It's Libel to Say Movie Folks are Fast", 2 October 1921

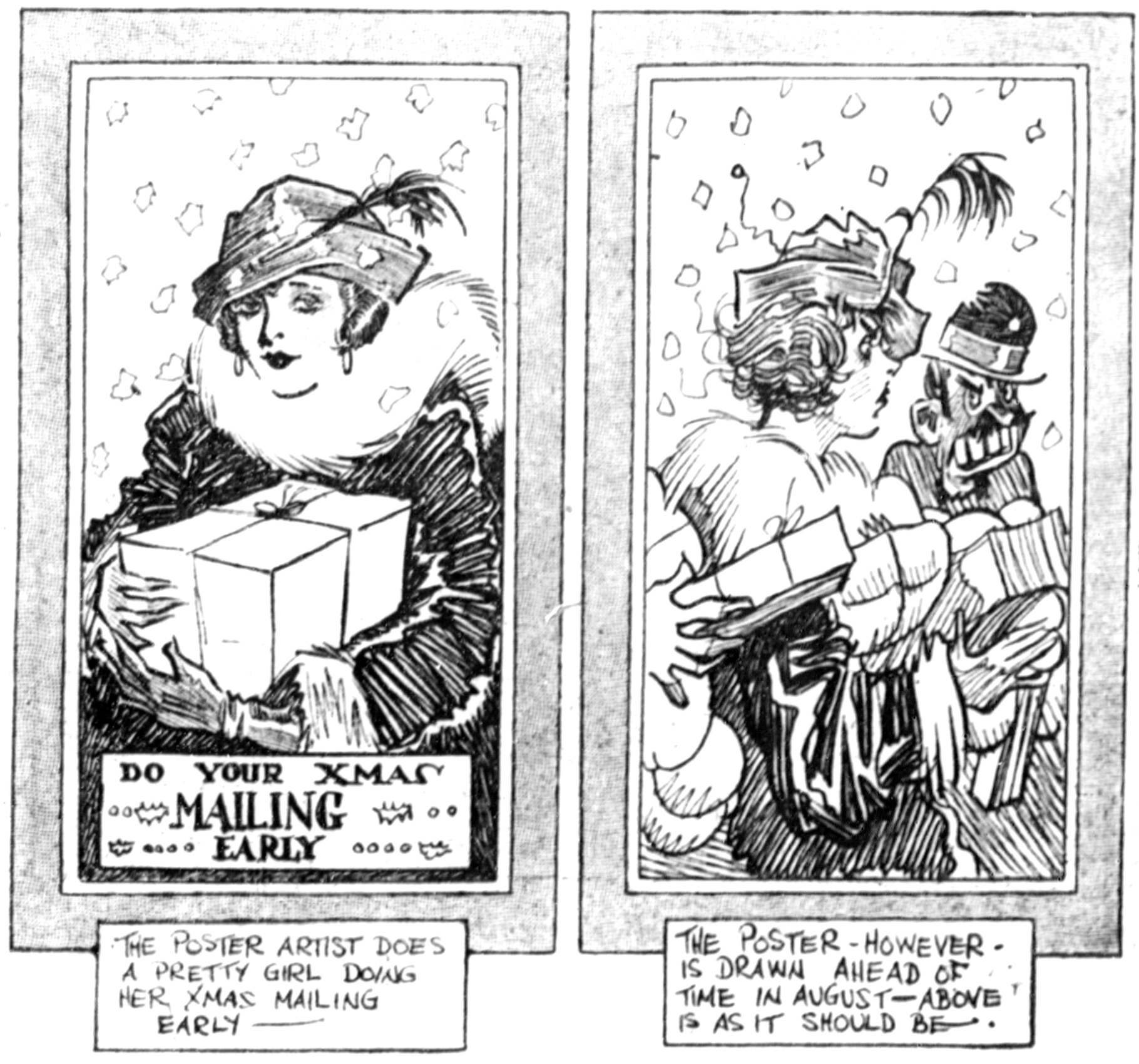
"Do Your XMas Mailing Early", 10 December 1922
