= Mary Nash (actress) =

American actress (1884–1976)

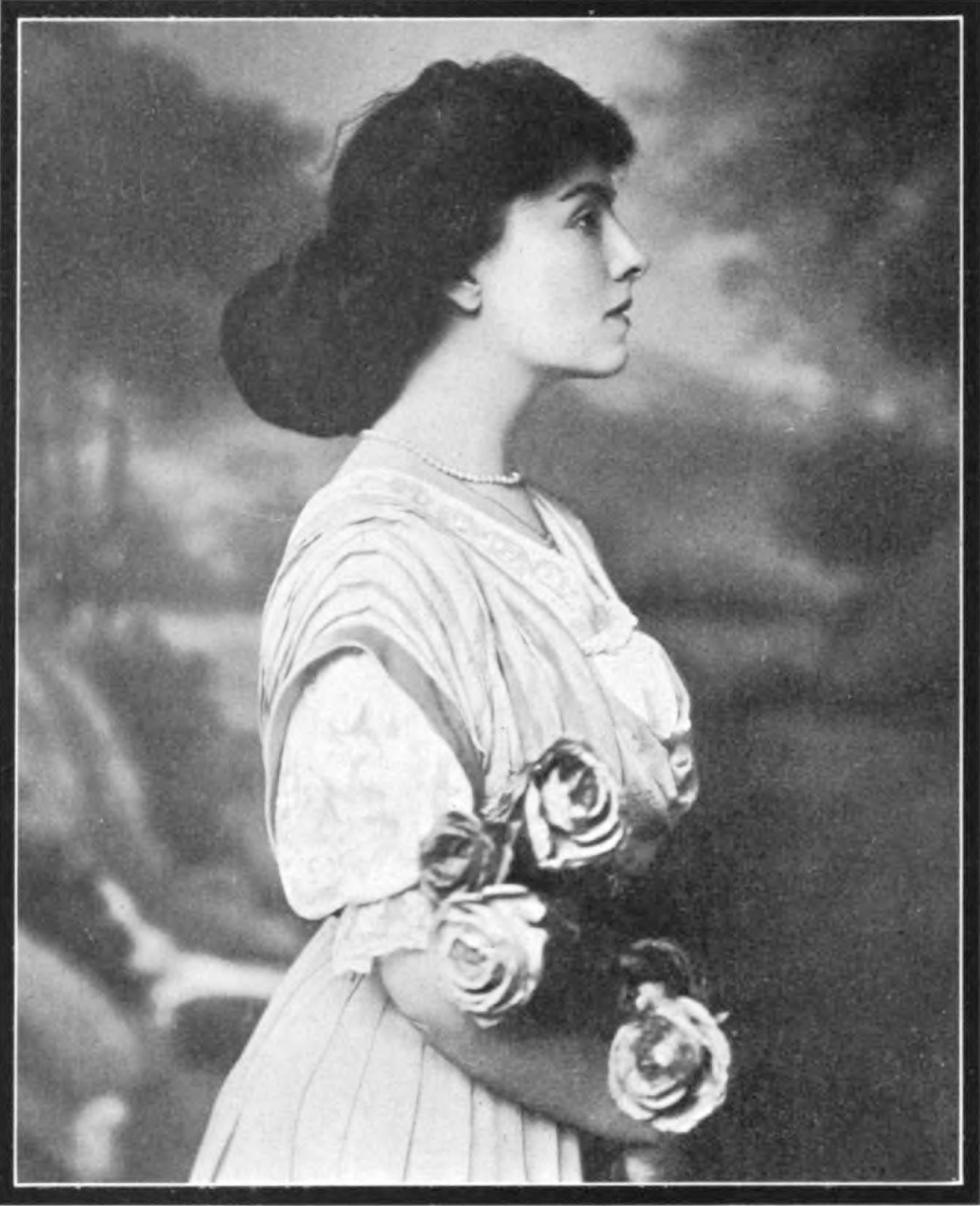
- Nash in 1909
- Born: Mary Honora Ryan; August 15, 1884; Troy, New York, U.S.
- Died: December 3, 1976 (aged 92); Brentwood, Los Angeles, California, U.S.
- Resting place: St. Agnes Cemetery
- Education: American Academy of Dramatic Arts
- Occupation: Actress
- Years active: 1904–1946
- Known for: In the Meantime, Darling; Heidi; The Little Princess
- Spouse(s): José Ruben, married 1918, divorced after 1923
- Relatives: Florence Nash (sister)

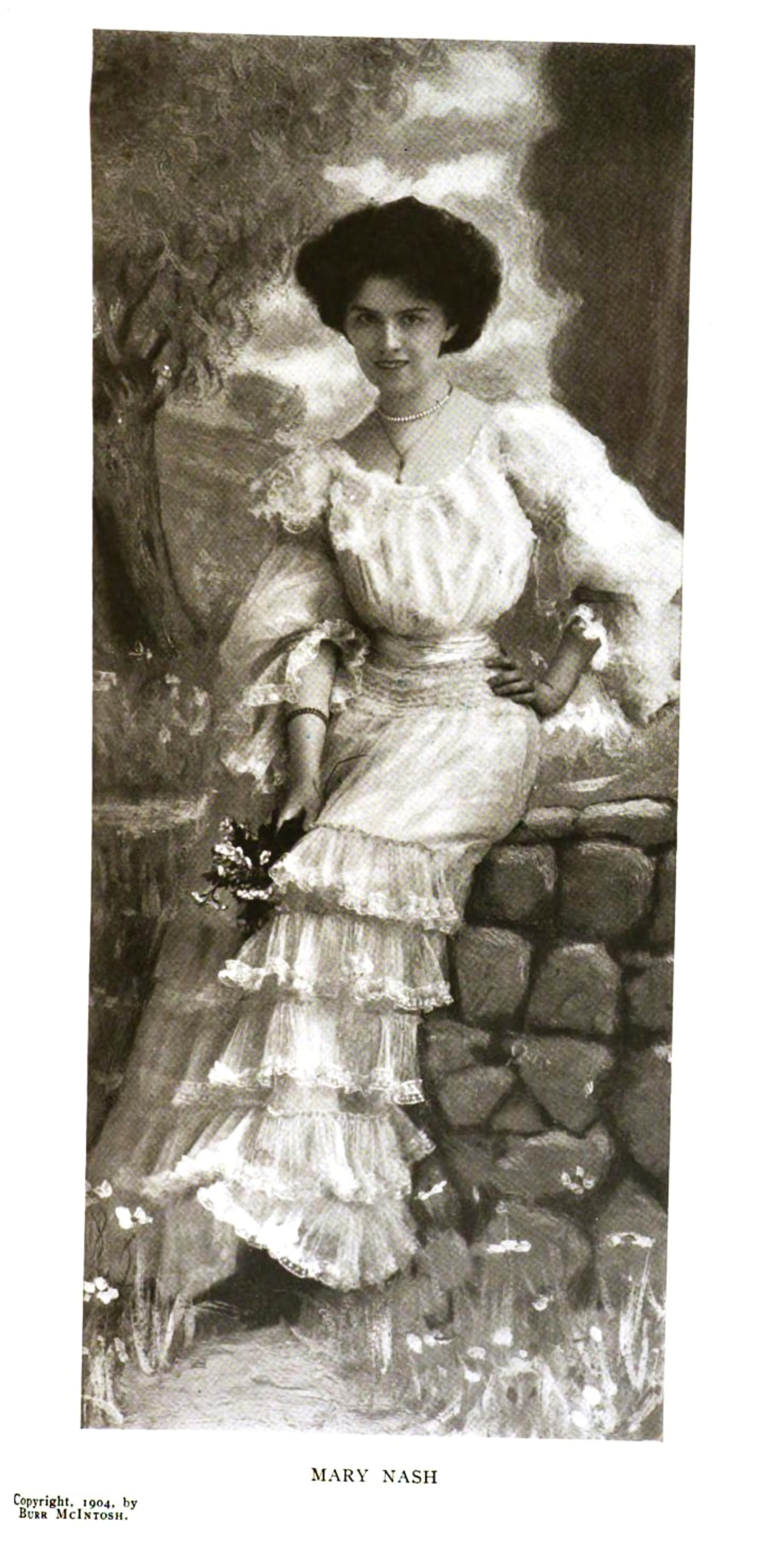
Nash ca. 1904

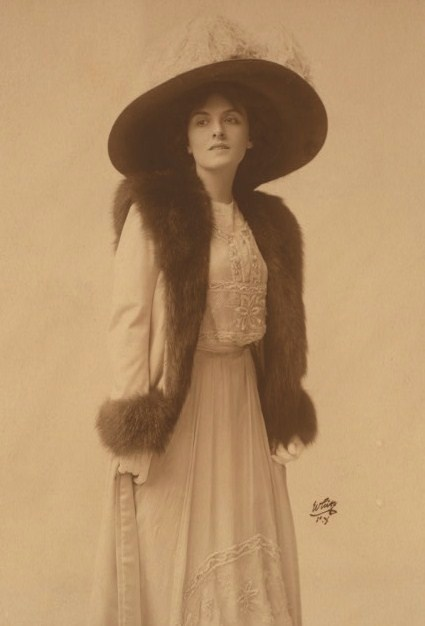
Nash ca. 1915

Mary Nash (born Mary Honora Ryan; August 15, 1884 – December 3, 1976) was an American actress.

== Early life ==
Mary and her younger sister, author/actress Florence, were born to James H. Ryan, a lawyer, and his wife, Ellen Frances (née McNamara). The sisters adopted the surname of their stepfather, Philip F. Nash, a vaudeville booking executive, who married their mother after the death of their father. Fortuitously, the name change would avoid conflict with actress Mary Ryan, who achieved Broadway popularity before Nash. Nash attended the Convent of St. Anne in Montreal and trained for acting at the American Academy of Dramatic Arts.

== Stage and film career ==
She was a stage actress in New York and London, and vaudeville. After brief appearances as a dancer at the Herald Square Theatre in 1904, she made her off-Broadway debut on Christmas Day 1905 as Leonora Dunbar in J. M. Barrie's Alice Sit-by-the-Fire, which starred Ethel Barrymore. She remained with Barrymore for two years, acting together in Captain Jinks and The Silver Box. Her last Broadway appearance was a production of Uncle Tom's Cabin in 1933 as Cassie, which starred Otis Skinner and Fay Bainter. She was acclaimed on the London stage. She started her Hollywood career in 1936, appearing in 18 films.

She moved to Hollywood in 1934, where she acted in films until 1946. According to Allmovie: "Nash was often cast as seemingly mild-mannered women who turned vicious when challenged, as witness her work in College Scandal (1936) and Charlie Chan in Panama (1940)...Mary Nash's most sympathetic role was as the long-suffering wife of blustering capitalist J.B. Ball in Easy Living (1937)." In the 1940 film Gold Rush Maisie, she played the patient, forbearing wife and mother of a family - forced by the Dust Bowl and Depression to abandon their farm in Arkansas - who spent five years traveling through the country in search of seasonal work.

Nash may be best known for playing villains in two Shirley Temple films, first as Fraulein Rottenmeier in Heidi (1937) and then as Miss Minchin in The Little Princess (1939). She played Katharine Hepburn's socialite mother in the movie version of The Philadelphia Story (1940). She played a supporting role in the 1936 Academy Award-winning film Come and Get It and had a featured role in the 1944 film In the Meantime, Darling.

== Personal life ==
On October 19, 1918, she wed the French-born actor and director José Ruben (1884–1969). They divorced sometime after 1923, when they were still living together with Florence Nash.

== Death ==
Nash died in her sleep at her Brentwood, California home on December 3, 1976. She was 92. She is interred at St. Agnes Cemetery in Menands, NY.

== Filmography ==
Year	Film	Role	Director	Notes
1915	The Unbroken Road	Constance Turner		
1915	Tides of Time	Mary Martin (in the Five Ages of Woman)		Short
1916	Arms and the Woman	Rozika	George Fitzmaurice	
1934	Uncertain Lady	Edith Hayes	Karl Freund	
1935	College Scandal	Mrs. Fresnel	Elliott Nugent	
1936	Come and Get It	Emma Louise	William Wyler	
1937	The King and the Chorus Girl	Duchess Anna of Elberfield	Mervyn LeRoy	
1937	Easy Living	Mrs. Ball	Mitchell Leisen	
1937	Heidi	Fraulein Rottenmeier	Allan Dwan	
1937	Wells Fargo	Mrs. Pryor	Frank Lloyd	
1939	The Little Princess	Amanda Minchin	Walter Lang	
1939	The Rains Came	Miss Mac Daid	Clarence Brown	
1940	Charlie Chan in Panama	Miss Jennie Finch	Norman Foster	
1940	Sailor's Lady	Miss Purvis	Allan Dwan	
1940	Gold Rush Maisie	Sarah Davis	Norman Taurog	
1940	The Philadelphia Story	Margaret Lord	George Cukor	
1941	Men of Boys Town	Mrs. Maitland	Norman Taurog	
1942	Calling Dr. Gillespie	Emma Hope	Harold S. Bucquet	
1943	The Human Comedy	Miss Hicks	Clarence Brown	
1944	The Lady and the Monster	Mrs. Fame - the housekeeper	George Sherman	
1944	Cobra Woman	Queen	Robert Siodmak	
1944	In the Meantime, Darling	Mrs. Vera Preston	Otto Preminger	
1945	Yolanda and the Thief	Duenna	Vincente Minnelli	
1946	Monsieur Beaucaire	The Duenna	George Marshall	
1946	Till the Clouds Roll By	Mrs. Muller	Richard Whorf	
1946	Swell Guy	Sarah Duncan	Frank Tuttle	Final film role
