= Charlie Chan in Panama =

1940 film by Norman Foster

- Directed by: Norman Foster
- Written by: Earl Derr Biggers (characters); John Larkin; Lester Ziffren
- Produced by: Sol M. Wurtzel
- Starring: Sidney Toler; Jean Rogers; Lionel Atwill; Mary Nash; Victor Sen Yung
- Cinematography: Virgil Miller
- Edited by: Fred Allen
- Music by: Samuel Kaylin
- Production company: Twentieth Century-Fox
- Distributed by: Twentieth Century-Fox
- Release date: March 1, 1940
- Running time: 67 minutes
- Country: United States
- Language: English

Charlie Chan in Panama is a 1940 mystery film starring Sidney Toler. It is an uncredited remake of Jacques Deval's novel Marie Galante, produced by 20th Century Fox in 1934, directed by Henry King.

== Plot ==
Charlie Chan must stop a spy from destroying the Panama Canal, trapping a Navy fleet on its way to the Pacific after maneuvers in the Atlantic. As the U.S. fleet prepares to navigate the waters of the Panama Canal, Panama City becomes rife with spies.

A new group of suspects appears with the arrival of a sea plane bound for Balboa. Among the suspects are novelist Clivedon Compton, matronly school teacher Miss Jennie Finch, sinister scientist Dr. Rudolph Grosser, café proprietor Manolo, singer Kathi Lenesch (real name Kathi von Tzardas), cigarette salesman Achmed Halide, government engineer Richard Cabot and government agent Godley.

Upon landing, Godley goes to a hat shop owned by Fu Yuen, alias Charlie Chan, to enlist the sleuth's help in unmasking the deadly spy known only as Reiner. Just as Godley is about to divulge Reiner's real identity, he falls to the ground, dead, leaving Chan to expose Reiner before the spy can sabotage the canal. Godley died from a poison-laced cigarette that could only have been planted on him by a fellow seaplane passenger, so Chan keeps a weather eye on them during their hotel holdover.

Number two Son Jimmy Chan is not only arrested for taking pictures, he spills the beans about his father's actual identity. He is discovered hiding under the bed in Compton's hotel room, looking for clues. A search of the room is forestalled by Kathi Lenesch's arrival. She begs Chan not to give away her "without passport" status. She had to flee when the Nazis took over Czechoslovakia. After she leaves, Jimmy throws a porcelain tobacco container at a gun hand peeking through the door. The broken container holds a detailed map of a nearby cemetery. This discovery prompts a further search of the room, where Compton's corpse is found in the closet, fatally shot. It develops he was undercover for the British Secret Service.

The map leads to the Manolo family tomb, which Chan discovers had been outfitted as a modern spy hideout. Miss Finch blunders onto the scene, and then somebody locks them in the tomb. Disguised as a water delivery man, a henchman has delivered a "water cooler" of nitro to the Main Power Plant building. The henchman makes the mistake of returning to the tomb, unwittingly releasing Chan and Jimmy and Captain Lewis. During a graveyard chase, the henchman is shot dead and is revealed to be Manolo. None of the "good guys" fired their guns, so who killed him?

Chan learns that the canal's Miraflores locks are to be blown up at ten that night. Chan then sequesters the suspects at the plant, forcing Miss Finch to expose herself as Reiner in order to escape death. With Reiner under arrest, the fleet sails safely through the locks to protect democracy. Chan then reveals he had previously defused her explosive device.

== Cast ==
- Sidney Toler as Charlie Chan
- Jean Rogers as Kathi Lenesch
- Lionel Atwill as Cliveden Compton
- Mary Nash as Miss Jennie Finch
- Victor Sen Yung as Jimmy Chan (as Sen Yung)
- Kane Richmond as Richard Cabot
- Chris-Pin Martin as Sergeant Montero
- Lionel Royce as Dr. Rudolph Grosser
- Helen Ericson as Stewardess
- Jack La Rue as Emil Manolo
- Edwin Stanley as Governor D.C. Webster
- Donald Douglas as Captain Lewis
- Frank Puglia as Achmed Halide
- Addison Richards as R.J. Godley
- Edward Keane as Dr. Fredericks
- Charles Stevens as Native Fisherman

== Critical reception ==
Film critic Bosley Crowther wrote in The New York Times that "While other members of the cast fall around him like flies, Charlie Chan proceeds in his customary leisurely fashion to unravel the mystery [...] attended by a great deal of talk in the currently modish style of 'Confucious say' and by the usual number of murders". Writing in DVD Talk, film critic Stuart Galbraith IV described the film as "lacquered with heavy swaths of propaganda," "rather generic," and "rather predictable," but "interesting for the way it acknowledges [World War II] without ever naming any of the major players," and noted that "the way he (Charlie's Number-Two son) keeps blowing Charlie's cover from film-to-film you begin to wonder just whose side he's on."
