= My Old Dutch (1926 film) =

1926 film by Laurence Trimble

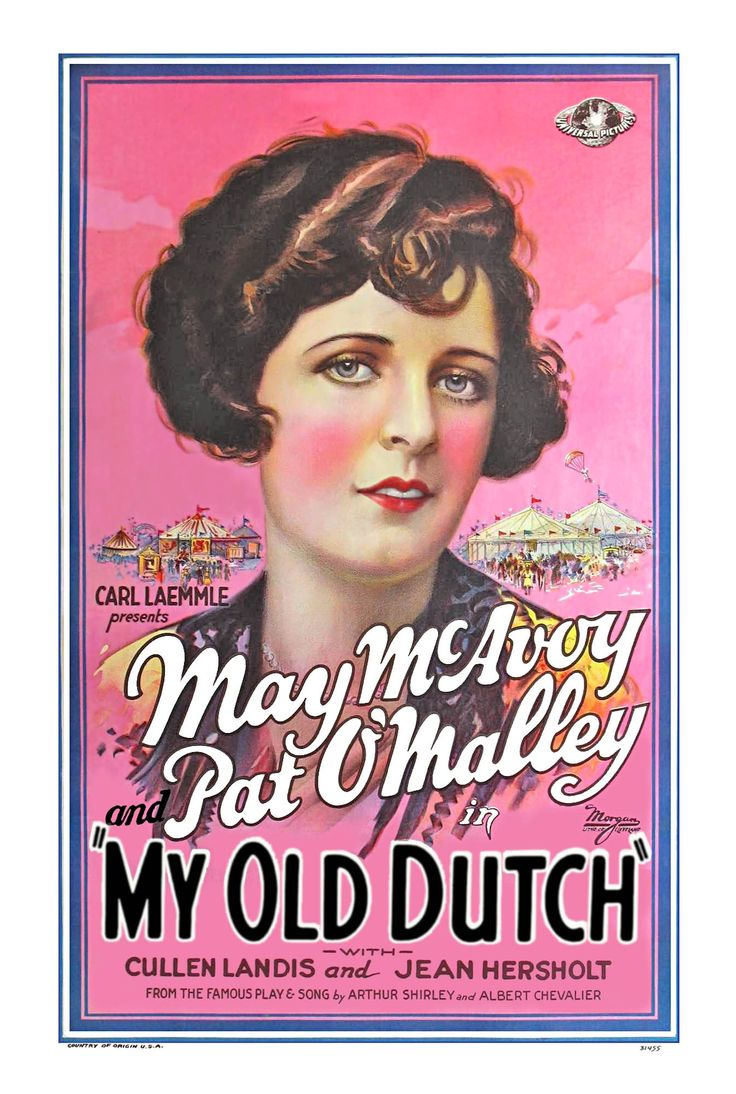
- Film poster
- Directed by: Laurence Trimble
- Written by: Laurence Trimble
- Based on: the play My Old Dutch by Albert Chevalier and Arthur Shirley and the song My Old Dutch by Chevalier
- Produced by: Carl Laemmle
- Starring: May McAvoy; Pat O'Malley
- Cinematography: Edward Gheller
- Distributed by: Universal Pictures
- Release date: May 23, 1926
- Running time: 82 minutes
- Country: United States
- Language: Silent (English intertitles)

My Old Dutch is a 1926 American silent drama film directed by Laurence Trimble and starring May McAvoy and Pat O'Malley. It was produced and distributed by Universal Pictures. Trimble had directed a 1915 British version of My Old Dutch that was also released by Universal.

== Plot ==
As described in a film magazine, costermonger Joe Brown of London marries Sal Gratton and, after they have a son Herbert, they come into some money and decide to make a gentleman of their son. The son grows up under the supervision of a private school faculty, never knowing of the lowly station of his parents. Reaching manhood, he loses his fortune gambling. His parents are sent to a poorhouse. They comfort each other and keep faith in their son's eventual return, which is realized when he returns after the war to care for his parents to the end of their days.

== Cast ==
- May McAvoy as Sal Gratton
- Pat O'Malley as Joe Brown
- Cullen Landis as Herbert Brown
- Jean Hersholt as 'Erb 'Uggins
- Agnes Steele as Mrs. Shudd
- Patsy O'Byrne as Mrs. Smiff
- Edgar Kennedy as Bill Sproat
- Frank Hall Crane as James Vrayford
- Rolfe Sedan as Al
- Violet Kane as Mary Avenell, age 3
- Kathleen O'Malley as Herbert Brown, infant
- Sheila O'Malley as Herbert Brown, age 3
- Newton Hall as Herbert Brown, age 12
- Zama Zameria as Mrs. Avenell
- Jane Winton as Lady Diana Crowes
- George Siegmann as Workhouse superintendent
- D'Arcy Corrigan as Minor role (uncredited)

== Production ==
Director Laurence Trimble initiated a remake of his own 1915 British version of My Old Dutch to feature its star, Florence Turner. Actor James Morrison remembered Trimble telling him that Turner wished to get back into films, and asking him to help in a screen test that he could show to Universal Pictures. "He got a little company together—the people who were in it worked for nothing, because we loved Flotie—and we did scenes from My Old Dutch," Morrison recalled. Universal approved the project but cast May McAvoy, not Turner, in the starring role.

== Preservation ==
A print of My Old Dutch is held in the collection of Indiana University.
