= John Charles Bond-Andrews =

British musician and composer (1854–1899)

John Charles Bond-Andrews (14 December 1854 – 27 April 1899) was an English composer, pianist, music arranger, conductor and musician.

== Early life ==
John Charles Bond-Andrews was born in Birkenhead, Cheshire. He was the eldest son of John Stephen Andrews, physician, and Mary Teresa (née Meacock). When he was a boy his mother took him to Europe to be educated in music, he attended the Conservatorium of Music in Leipzig during the Franco-Prussian War. In between his music lessons he occasionally wrote poetry. The house where he was staying with his mother and brother also billeted German soldiers. He studied at the Royal Academy of Music in London and reputedly studied at the Royal Music Academy of Vienna. In 1876 on his return from Europe he gave recitals in Birkenhead and other cities; he was a success as a pianist in London.

== Career ==
In the 1880s, Bond-Andrews gave minor concerts in the country, which were unsuccessful, and in town, which were successful. He was a music tutor to Lady Louisa Ashburton and other minor notable people of the time, before joining Albert Chevalier in the 1890s. He helped arranged tours with Albert Chevalier and accompanied him on the Ireland 1895 tour. He also acted as conductor for other opera companies while on tour, with the Carl Rosa Opera Company among others.

He had taken the popular excerpt "My Lady Sleeps" from Longfellow's The Spanish Student, and arranged it for voice and string quartet as well as piano and violin or flute obbligato. This music can still be heard today in a private collection. He composed Herne's Oak, produced at Liverpool, October 1887; The Rose of Windsor, Accrington, August 1889; an operetta, A Pair of Lunatics in 1892, Quartet in B-flat, Trio in D minor, pianoforte and strings, and Sonata in G minor, May Pole suite, and many other pieces for pianoforte.

In 1895 he arranged and composed music for the first act of The Importance of Being Earnest for a musical event. On 26 May 1896 he performed for the Prince and Princess of Wales at a gala opening of the West wing of the West London Hospital. While riding high on this major success and others, Bond-Andrews was struck down by an illness that ended his life in the spring of 1899. He died in the West London Hospital, and is buried in Fulham Cemetery with his mother, who had died 18 months before.

== Personal life ==
On 28 May 1881 John Charles Bond-Andrews married Ellen Jane Trusty (1864–1927). They had five children, Joseph, Richard, Mary, Henry and Isabelle.

His mother married again in 1874 to Charles deWolfe King, who accompanied Bond-Andrews as a singer at some of the events he attended as a piano player. His half-brother was Otis Carter Formby King (1876–1944), the inventor.

He was a member of the Savage Club and the New Lyric Club.

== Bibliography ==
- Brown, James D. (1897). British Musical Biography. Birmingham: S.S. Stratton.
- Andrews, J.D.F. (1900). Memoirs of Bond-Andrews. L.& A. Harris.
