= My Old Dutch (1915 film) =

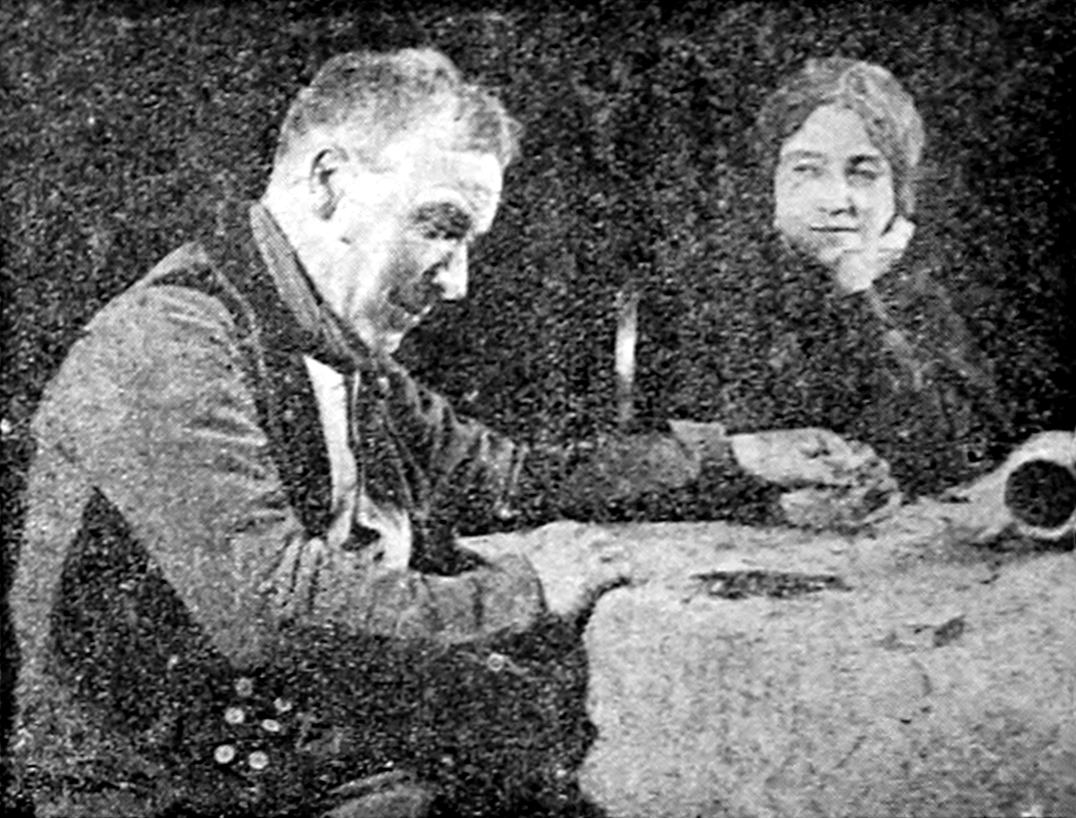
- Joe (Albert Chevalier) counts up his fast-dwindling savings with his "Old Dutch" (Florence Turner)
- Directed by: Laurence Trimble
- Written by: Albert Chevalier; Arthur Shirley
- Produced by: Florence Turner
- Starring: Albert Chevalier; Florence Turner
- Production company: Turner Films
- Distributed by: Ideal Films (UK); Universal Pictures (US)
- Release dates: June 1915 (UK); 22 November 1915 (US)
- Running time: 50 minute
- Country: United Kingdom
- Languages: Silent; English intertitles

My Old Dutch is a 1915 British silent drama film directed by Laurence Trimble and starring Albert Chevalier and Florence Turner. A film version of Chevalier's internationally renowned song, it was seen by millions in Great Britain during the First World War and was also a success in the United States.

== Plot ==
Described as "an unashamed tear-jerker" by film writer Clive Hirschhorn, My Old Dutch is the story of a devoted marriage over 40 years—from the couple's meeting until their rescue from a gender-segregated workhouse in their old age. The screenplay was inspired by Albert Chevalier's celebrated song, "My Old Dutch" (1892). The title is a Cockney colloquialism for a female partner or, especially, wife.

== Cast ==
- Albert Chevalier as Joe Brown
- Florence Turner as Sal Gray
- Henry Edwards as Herbert Brown
- Harry Brett as 'Erb 'Uggins
- Arthur Shirley as Doctor
- Richard Cotter as Nipper
- Amy Lorraine
- Minnie Rayner

== Production ==
My Old Dutch is considered the most important film in which American film star Florence Turner worked while heading her own independent film company in England. The film was produced by Turner Films and financed by the Ideal Film Company, Britain's largest distributor of motion pictures. Ideal commissioned the film to showcase the revered music hall comedian, singer and actor Albert Chevalier, whose 1892 song "My Old Dutch" was internationally renowned. Turner received second billing, but she received the same fee, £500, that was paid to Chevalier, making her the highest-paid woman in British film.

Director Laurence Trimble said that the film had "a universal appeal, something striking deep in human nature, not dependent upon race or prejudice and comprehensible to both old and young. The theme in this instance is idyllic love."

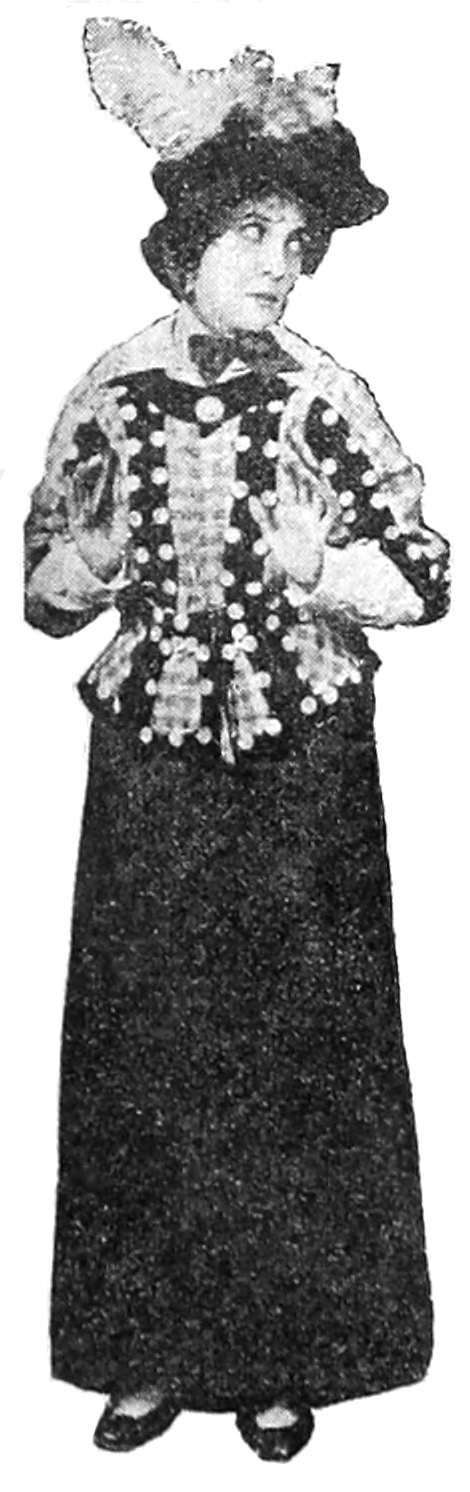
Florence Turner as Sal

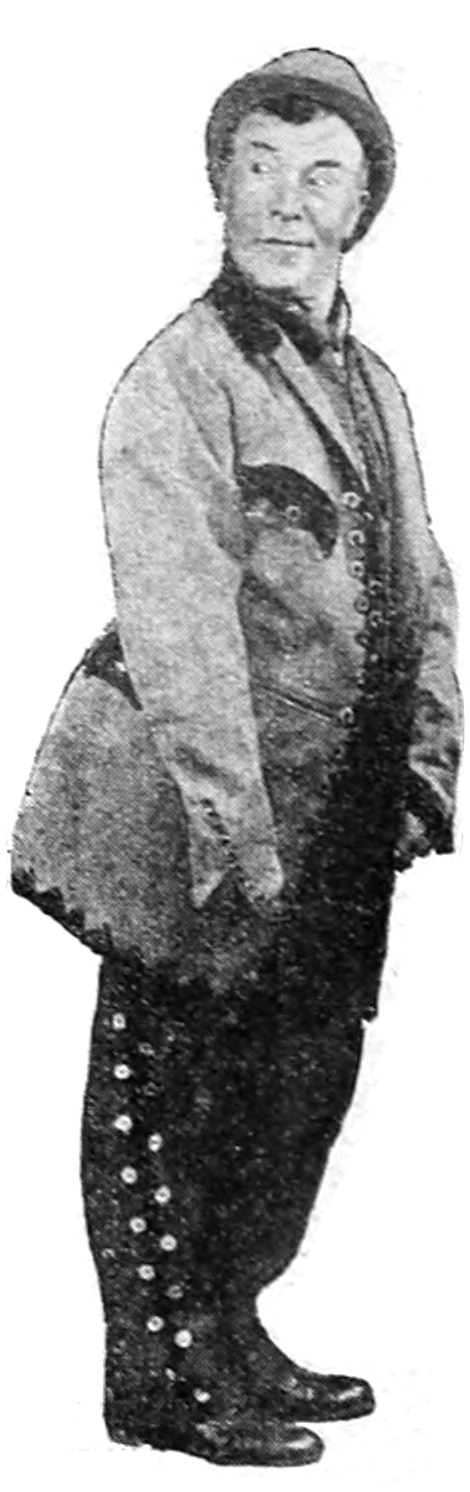
Albert Chevalier as Joe

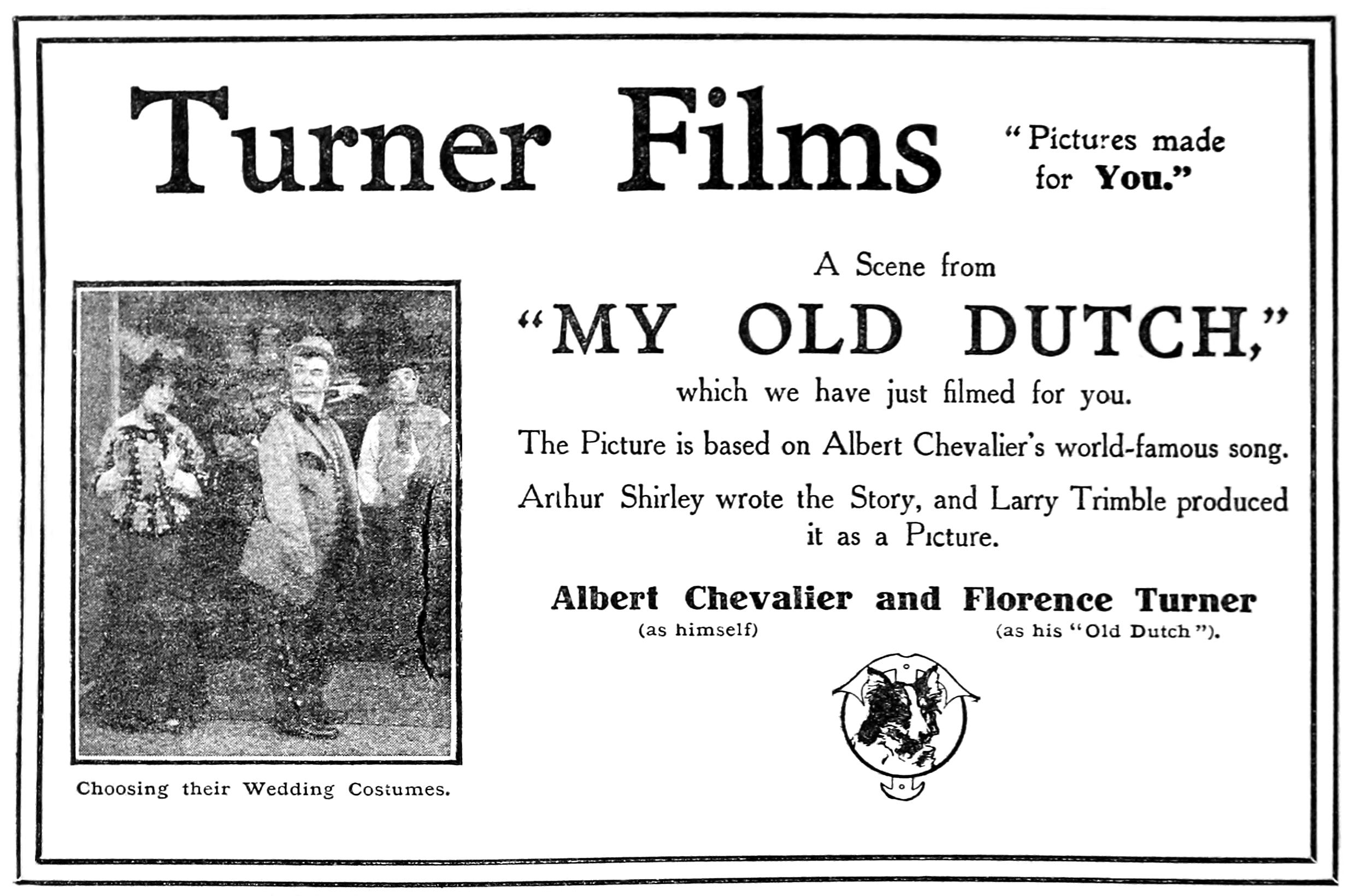
Advertisement (12 June 1915)

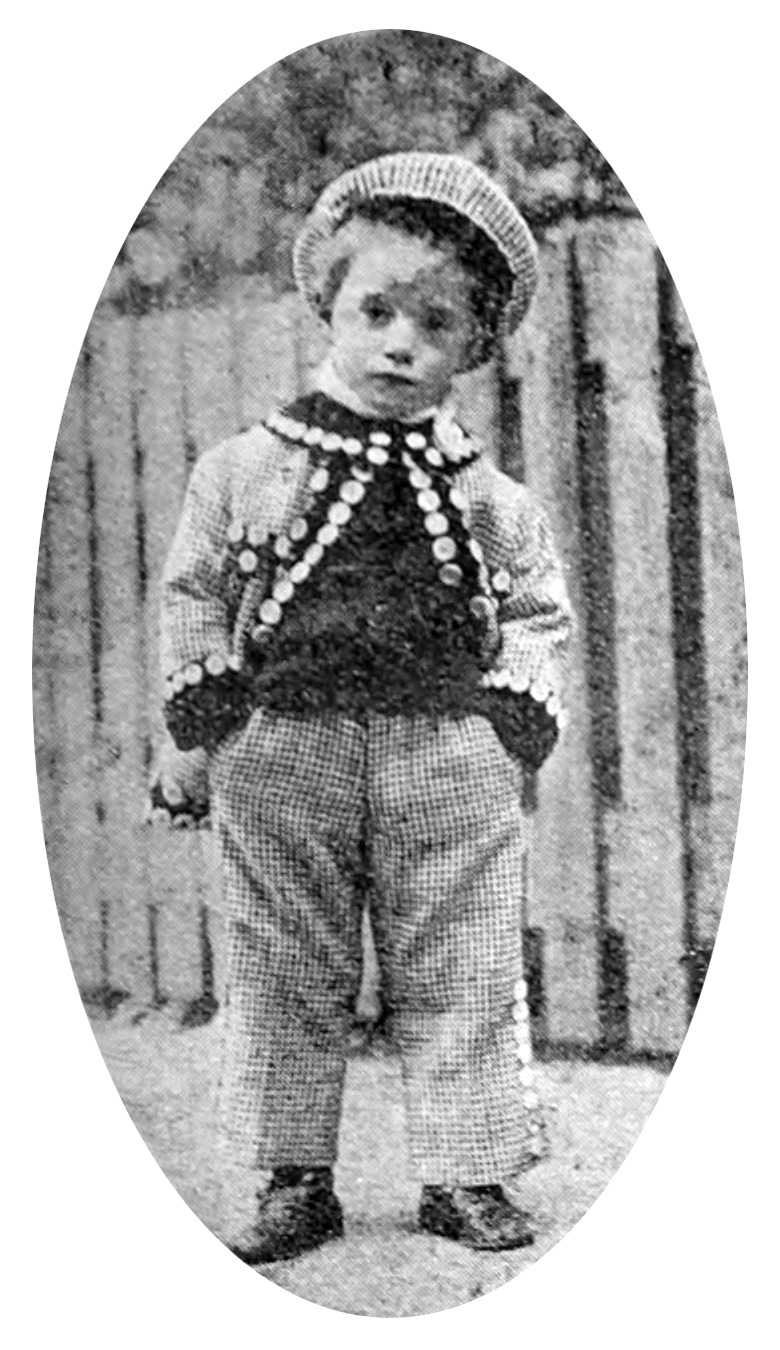
Richard Cotter as Nipper

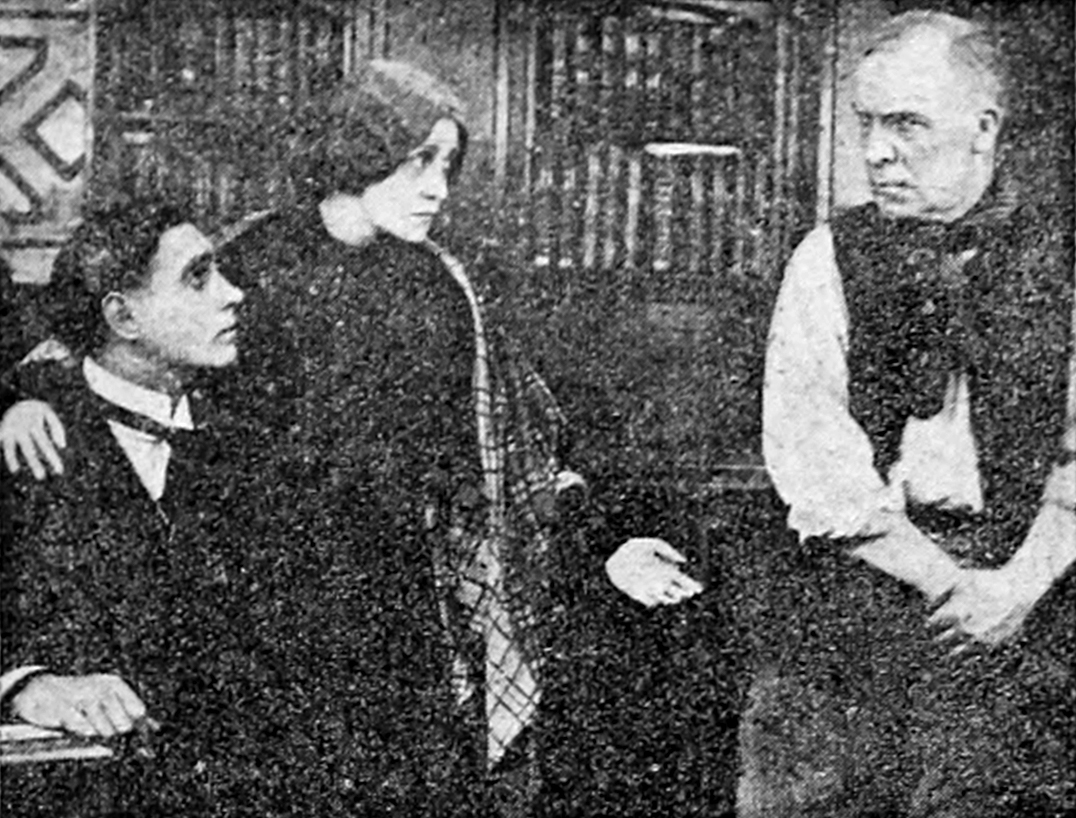
Henry Edwards, Florence Turner and Albert Chevalier

== Reception ==
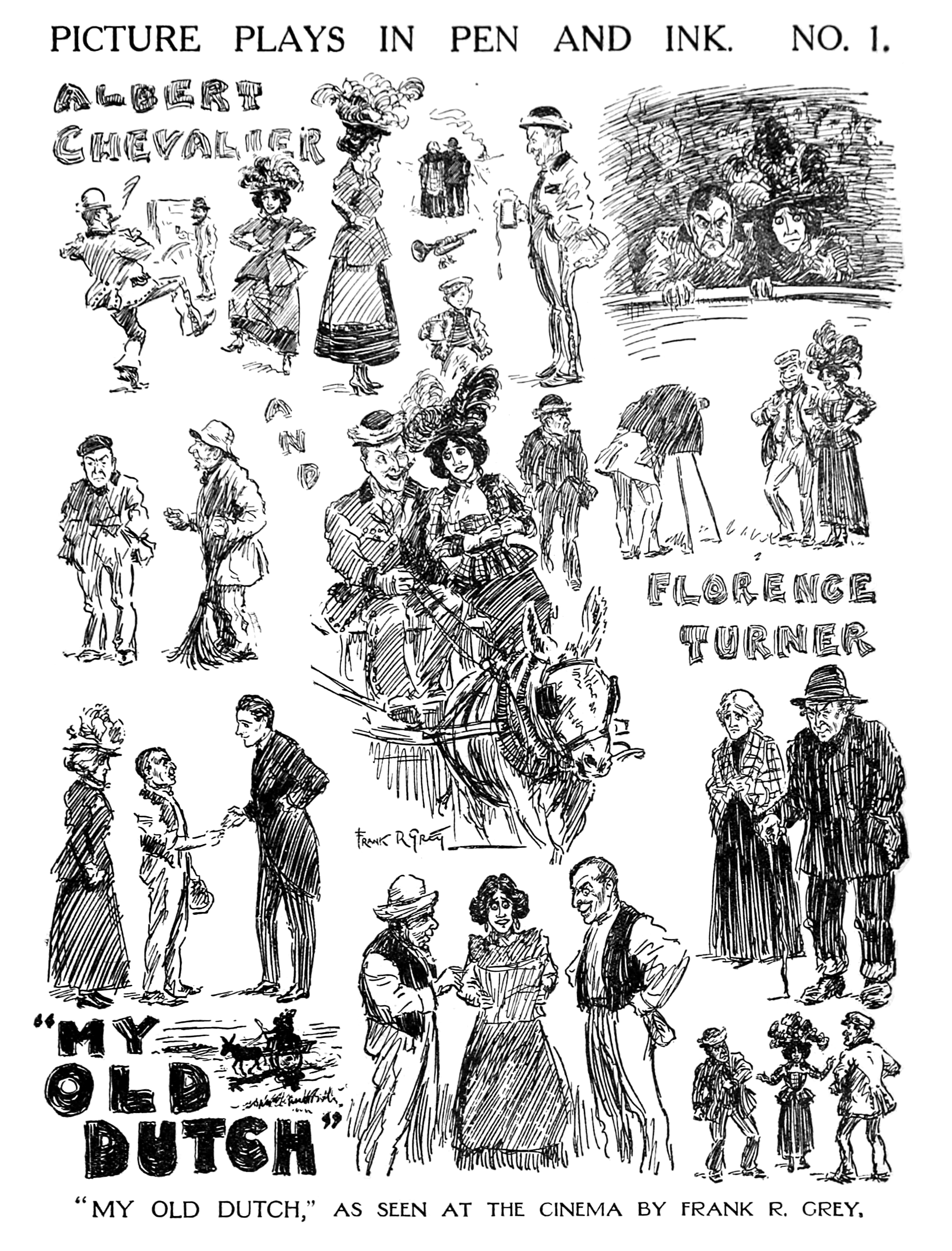
Illustrator Frank R. Grey sketched scenes from My Old Dutch for Pictures and The Picturegoer magazine (28 August 1915)

My Old Dutch was a great success in Britain. Booked into 1,600 theatres by 1918, the film was seen by an estimated five million people over the course of the First World War.

My Old Dutch was also well received in the United States after its release by Universal Pictures on 22 November 1915. The Moving Picture World called it "a rare picture, great in its simplicity, strong in its appeal, and splendidly played by its two principals. It is wholesome. It is a story that might have come from between the covers of a Dickens—with its sunshine and shade, its quaint types, its Life."

"It is almost a profanation to find fault with anything in these five wonderful reels," wrote Variety. "But the worst that can be said of it is that Albert Chevalier looks too old in the early portion and Florence Turner too young in the later section."

== Survival status ==
The survival status of My Old Dutch is unknown.

== Remake ==
Director Laurence Trimble initiated a 1926 Hollywood remake of his own 1915 British version of My Old Dutch to feature its star, Florence Turner. Actor James Morrison recalled Trimble telling him that Turner hoped to get back into films, and he asked him to help in a screen test that could be shown to Universal Pictures. "He got a little company together—the people who were in it worked for nothing, because we loved Flotie—and we did scenes from My Old Dutch," Morrison said. Universal approved the project but cast May McAvoy, not Turner, in the starring role.
