= The Little Princess (1939 film) =

1939 film directed by Walter Lang

- Theatrical release poster
- Directed by: Walter Lang
- Screenplay by: Ethel Hill; Walter Ferris
- Based on: A Little Princess; 1905 novel by Frances Hodgson Burnett
- Produced by: Gene Markey (associate producer)
- Starring: Shirley Temple; Richard Greene; Anita Louise; Ian Hunter; Arthur Treacher; Cesar Romero; Mary Nash; Sybil Jason; Miles Mander; Marcia Mae Jones
- Cinematography: Arthur C. Miller; William Skall
- Edited by: Louis Loeffler
- Music by: Charles Maxwell; Cyril J. Mockridge; Herbert W. Spencer; Samuel Pokrass
- Distributed by: Twentieth Century-Fox Film Corporation
- Release date: March 10, 1939
- Running time: 93 minutes
- Country: United States
- Language: English
- Budget: over $1 million or $1.3 million

The Little Princess is a 1939 American drama film directed by Walter Lang. The screenplay by Ethel Hill and Walter Ferris is loosely based on the 1905 novel A Little Princess by Frances Hodgson Burnett. It was the first Shirley Temple movie to be filmed completely in Technicolor. It was also her last major success as a child star. This film was the third of three in which Shirley Temple and Cesar Romero appeared together, following Wee Willie Winkie (1937) and Ali Baba Goes to Town (1937).

Although it maintained the novel's Victorian London setting, the film introduced several new characters and storylines and used the Second Boer War and the siege of Mafeking as a backdrop to the action. Temple and Arthur Treacher had a musical number together, performing the song "Knocked 'Em in the Old Kent Road". Temple also appeared in an extended ballet sequence. The film's ending was drastically different from the book.

In 1968, The Little Princess entered the public domain in the United States because the claimants did not renew its copyright registration in the 28th year after publication.

== Plot ==
The Little Princess (1939)

In 1899 England, Captain Crewe, called to fight in the Second Boer War, has to leave his daughter Sara with her pony at Miss Minchin's School for Girls. With all the money Captain Crewe can offer, Miss Minchin gives Sara a fancy, private room.

Although worried about her father, Sara is distracted by riding lessons. During these riding lessons, Sara helps contrive meetings between her teacher Miss Rose and Mr. Geoffrey, the riding instructor, who is also the grandson of the mean-spirited next-door neighbor, Lord Wickham. Mr. Geoffrey decides to volunteer to fight in the war and asks Miss Rose to marry him before leaving. Sara has him to tea before he ships out, using the excuse to convince Miss Minchin, but she catches Geoffrey and Rose together, not allowing them to say a proper goodbye. Sara later hears news that Mafeking is free and expects her father will soon come home. Miss Minchin throws Sara a lavish birthday party at the request of her father. During the party, Captain Crewe's solicitor arrives with the sad news that Captain Crewe has died and his real estate, the basis for his wealth, has been confiscated. Miss Minchin ends Sara's party abruptly. Without her father's financial support, Sara becomes a servant, now working at the school she used to attend. Sara gains new solace in a friendship with Ram Dass, Lord Wickham's servant. She also receives support from Miss Minchin's brother Bertie, who does not agree with her treatment. Miss Minchin confiscates a letter from Mr. Geoffrey to Rose and fires her. She intervenes with Geoffrey's grandfather, who vows to never speak to him again.

In her new role, Sara gets hungrier and more tired from her arduous duties and sneaks off to veterans' hospitals, convinced her father is not dead. After a string of episodes, including a performance of the film's most well-known song "Knocked 'em in the Old Kent Road" with Bertie, Sara is at her wit's end. Things start to worsen, when Sara gets into an argument with Miss Minchin, who cannot tolerate her faith in believing her father is still alive and tries forcing her to face reality. She is taunted by Lavinia the next day, eventually causing her to lose her temper and dump ashes on her. Miss Minchin arrives in the attic to punish Sara for "hurting" Lavinia. She discovers blankets, food, and other items that Ram Dass and Lord Wickham left Sara, assumes they are stolen, and locks her in the attic, calling the police. Sara escapes and runs to the hospital with Minchin in hot pursuit.

Meanwhile, the hospital is preparing to transfer a newly arrived unknown patient, who is unable to communicate except to repeatedly say, "Sara, Sara"; he is Captain Crewe. Sara bursts in upon a visit by Queen Victoria, who grants her permission to search for her father. During her search, she is reunited with a wounded Mr. Geoffrey and Miss Rose. Hiding from Miss Minchin and the police, she happens upon her father in the waiting room. Initially, he does not respond to her, but her cries bring him out of his stupor.

A staff member announces Sara has found her father and Miss Minchin exclaims: "Captain Crewe is alive?!", to which her brother retorts, "Of course he's alive! How could she find him if he wasn't alive?" The film ends with Sara helping her father stand as the Queen departs, smiling at Sara on the way out.

== Cast ==
- Shirley Temple as Sara Crewe
- Richard Greene as Geoffrey Hamilton
- Anita Louise as Rose
- Ian Hunter as Captain Reginald Crewe
- Cesar Romero as Ram Dass
- Arthur Treacher as Hubert "Bertie" Minchin
- Mary Nash as Mistress Amanda Minchin
- Sybil Jason as Becky
- Miles Mander as Lord Wickham
- Marcia Mae Jones as Lavinia
- Deidre Gale as Jessie
- Ira Stevens as Ermengarde
- E. E. Clive as Mr. Barrows
- Beryl Mercer as Queen Victoria
- Eily Malyon as Mrs. O'Connell the Cook
- Rita Paige as Minnie the Cook's Helper
- Clyde Cook as Attendant
- Keith Kenneth as Bobbie
- Will Stanton as a Groom
- Harry Allen as a Groom
- Holmes Herbert as a Doctor
- Evan Thomas as a Doctor
- Guy Bellis as a Doctor
- Kenneth Hunter as General
- Lionel Braham as Colonel

== Production ==
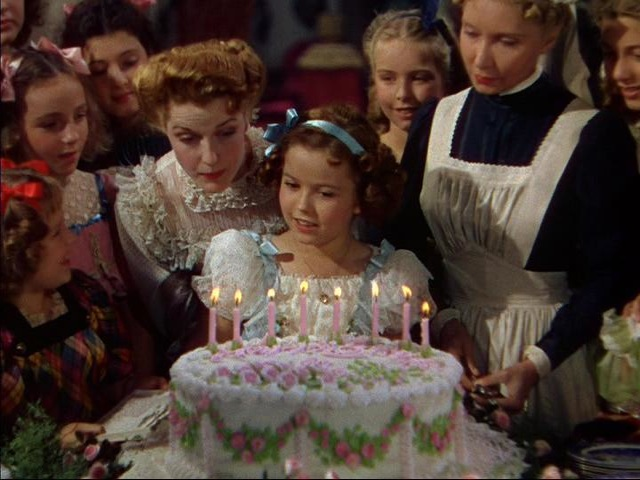
Birthday party scene

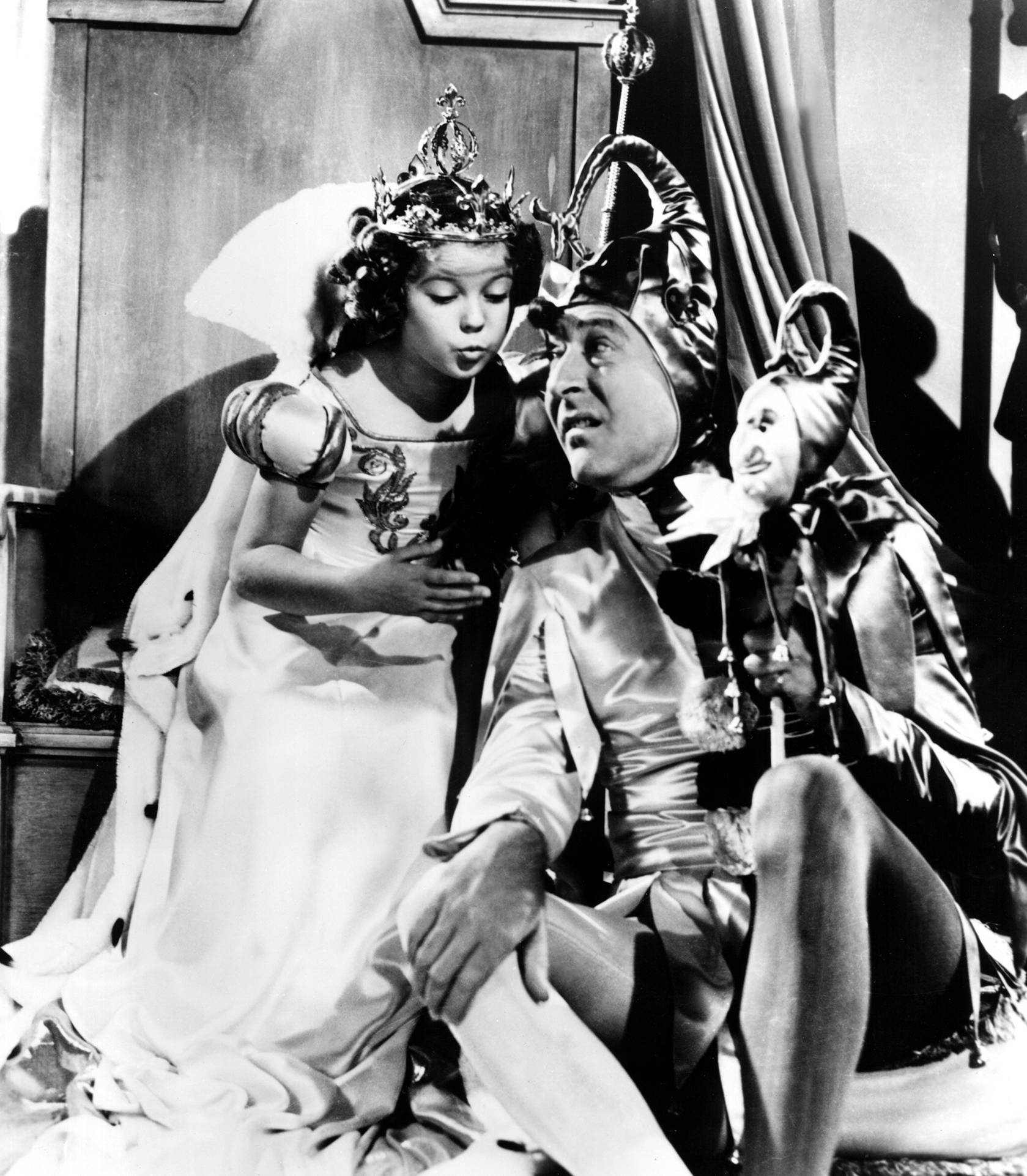
Shirley Temple and Arthur Treacher

After filming was completed, Darryl Zanuck of Fox requested additional scenes shot totalling $300,000, thus pushing the cost over $1 million. This made the movie the most expensive Shirley Temple film to date.

As part of the preparation for the film, great pains were taken to make sure every aspect of it was true to 1899 and England, the time period and setting of the story. Props such as the doll had to be to the exact specifications of a doll made at that time. Clothing also had to be precise. Production was held up after one of the costumes Temple wore was found to have used snap fasteners that were not invented until 1908.

During the scene where Temple dumps ashes on Marcia Mae Jones' character, the original plan was to do it in one take. Temple, however, who was angry about the attention received by Sybil Jason in a previous scene, wanted to repeat it after the first take, likely just to "let off steam", but when she asked director Lang for a second ash-dump take, he said it was not necessary.

For the ballet dance scene, Temple was trained by ballet dance instructor Ernest Belcher. Temple rented her pony Spunky to the studio to simply lie down in the stall. The artificial green coloration of the straw (which was green so it would show better in Technicolor), however, caused the pony to become restless and resulted in his being removed and Temple losing his appearance fee.

As a way of fitting in with the rest of the crew, Temple wanted to have her own punch card for punching in and out of work for the day and was initially rebuffed. Director Lang eventually relented and gave her a card to use. IBM caught word of Temple's enthusiasm and provided a special custom-made punch-card recorder embossed with her name along with punch cards with her photo on them. The machine sat unused while Temple continued using the regular machine. Her time cards were likewise ignored by the studio payroll person.

== Reception ==
According to Variety: "Transposition of the Frances Hodgson Burnett several-generation favorite, Sara Crewe, is accomplished most successfully. The fairy-tale story is still saccharine to the nth degree, but once the basic premise is established, it rolls along acceptably. And, while the story has been changed for screen purposes, the general line is close enough".

Benjamin R. Crisler, who reviewed the film when it opened in New York City at Roxy Theatre, said:

"With any other child on earth, it is amazing to reflect, The Little Princess would stand out as one of the most glaring exhibits of pure hokum in screen history; with Mistress Temple, it may very well be, as Mr. Zanuck unflinchingly proclaims, the greatest picture with which Mr. Zanuck has ever been associated".

Janet Maslin, writing for The New York Times 44 years later, on the occasion of its VHS release by Media Home Entertainment, called it "antiquated enough to seem charming" and concludes that "[t]he movie's music, its corny but likable histrionics and its rousing patriotism (it was made in 1939) culminate in a happy ending sure to make even grown-up viewers cry".
