= My Old Dutch (song) =

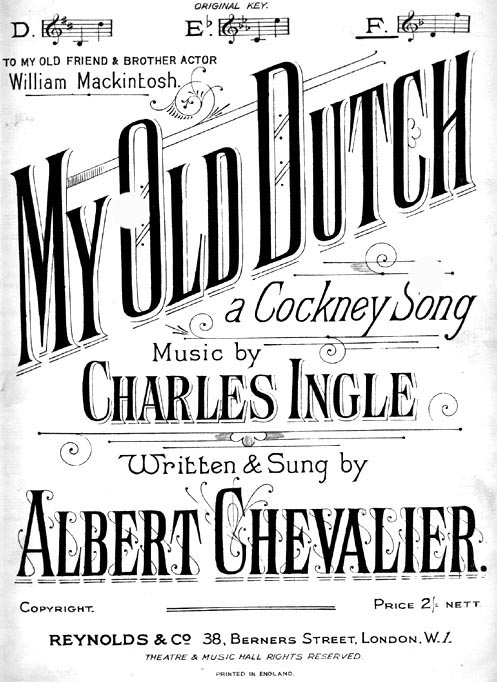
- Sheet music cover

Song by Albert Chevalier
- Published: 1892
- Composer: Charles Ingle
- Lyricist: Albert Chevalier

My Old Dutch
1899 recording by Albert Chevalier

"My Old Dutch" is an 1892 music hall and vaudeville song performed by Albert Chevalier. The lyrics were written by Chevalier, with music composed by his brother Auguste under the name Charles Ingle. Described as one of Chevalier's most popular works, the song was possibly written as a tribute to Chevalier's wife Florrie.

== Background ==
The song's title refers to an 1880s colloquialism for a partner or friend. The phrase has a number of suggested etymologies: three Cockney rhyming slang explanations identify the phrase as coming from "dutch plate" ("mate"), "Duchess of Fife" ("wife"), or "Dutch house" ("spouse"). These explanations have been scotched by researcher Gary Martin.

1. "Dutch plate" was never a familiar collocation, a first requirement for adoption into rhyming slang, unlike the genuine CRS "China plate" (for "mate").
2. "Dutch", short for "duchess", was used as an affectionate term in London slang long before 27 July 1889, when the Dukedom of Fife (and hence its duchess) was created.
3. See #1.

Chevalier, however, claimed that his wife's face reminded him of the clock face of a Dutch clock.

As with many music hall songs, the lyrics dealt with poverty and sex differences. When introducing the song, Chevalier would enter dressed as an elderly Cockney man with his elderly partner. They would head towards a workhouse, whereupon the porter would separate them under the sex segregation rules. Chevalier's character would cry out in refusal, "you can't do this to us; we've been together for forty years!" The porter and woman then exited the stage, and Chevalier would begin the song.

== Reception ==
Henry Chance Newton described the song as a "famous domestic monologue". Laura Ormiston Chant commented that the song outlined "the finest sentiments of the human heart [...] in a language understood by the people". Lewis Carroll said that the song influenced public taste "towards refinement and purity".

== Lyrics ==
I've got a pal,
A reg'lar out an' outer,
She's a dear good old gal,
I'll tell yer all about 'er.
It's many years since fust we met,
'Er 'air was then as black as jet,
It's whiter now, but she don't fret,
Not my old gal

We've been together now for forty years,
An' it don't seem a day too much,
There ain't a lady livin' in the land
As I'd swop for my dear old Dutch.

I calls 'er Sal,
'Er proper name is Sairer,
An' yer may find a gal
As you'd consider fairer.
She ain't a angel — she can start
A-jawin' till it makes yer smart,
She's just a woman, bless 'er eart,
Is my old gal!

We've been together now for forty years,
An' it don't seem a day too much,
There ain't a lady livin' in the land
As I'd swop for my dear old Dutch.

Sweet fine old gal,
For worlds I wouldn't lose 'er,
She's a dear good old gal,
An' that's what made me choose 'er.
She's stuck to me through thick and thin,
When luck was out, when luck was in,
Ah wot a wife to me she's been,
An' wot a pal!

We've been together now for forty years,
An' it don't seem a day too much,
There ain't a lady livin' in the land
As I'd swop for my dear old Dutch.

I sees yer Sal —
Yer pretty ribbons sportin'
Many years now, old gal,
Since them young days of courtin'.
I ain't a coward, still I trust
When we've to part, as part we must,
That Death may come and take me fust
To wait... my pal!

We've been together now for forty years,
An' it don't seem a day too much,
There ain't a lady livin' in the land
As I'd swop for my dear old Dutch.

== Legacy ==
In his later career, Chevalier performed a dramatised version of the song. In 1915, a film version was produced which starred Chevalier and Florence Turner. In 1926, a remake of the film was directed by Universal's Laurence Trimble. Turner made a screen test, but the lead role was given to May McAvoy. A third film based on the song was released in 1934, which was written by Arthur Shirley and directed by Sinclair Hill.

In a segment of Beatles Anthology concerning the Beatles receiving the Order of the British Empire, Ringo Starr claims that during their audience with Queen Elizabeth she asked how long the group had been together, he and Paul McCartney spontaneously sang We've been together now for forty years in jest, to the Queen's bemusement.

This song was also recorded in 1959 by actor and comedian Peter Sellers on a 7" single, Parlophone 45 R 4605, as well as on his album Songs for Swingin' Sellers of the same year. This version incidentally was produced by George Martin who later became famous for producing the Beatles.
