= Albert Chevalier =

English music hall performer (1861–1923)

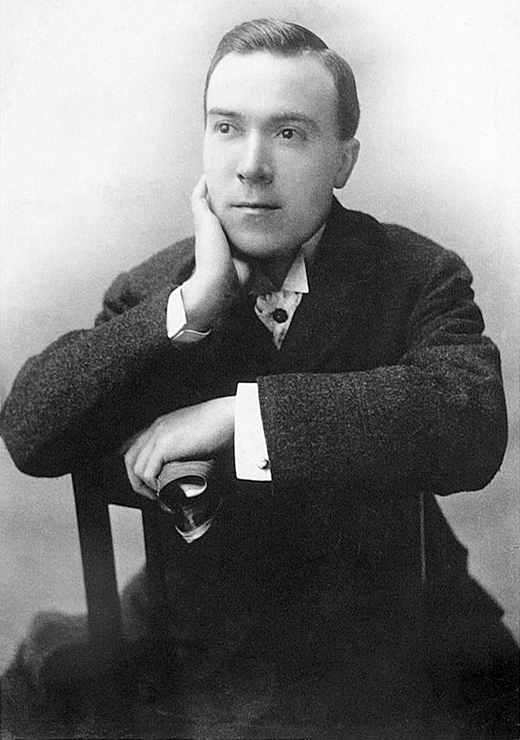
Albert Chevalier

Albert Chevalier (often listed as Albert Onésime Britannicus Gwathveoyd Louis Chevalier; 21 March 1861 – 10 July 1923) was an English music hall comedian, singer and musical theatre actor. He specialised in cockney related humour based on life as a costermonger in London during the Victorian era. Owing to this and his ability to write songs, he became known to his audiences as the "costers' laureate".

Born in London to a French father and Welsh mother, his name at birth was registered simply as "Albert Chevalier", but he gained the unusual middle names "Onésime Britannicus Gwathveoyd Louis" during his career. He showed an interest in entertainment from an early age through his private performances to family and friends. He made his debut on the amateur stage when he was eight, performing in Julius Caesar, at the local Cornwall Hall. Soon after, he joined a local amateur dramatics group before changing his stage name to "Albert Knight".

Chevalier joined the music hall circuit in the 1880s and over the decade became very successful. His success meant that from the early 1890s he was able to choose which theatres to perform in and often performed at three or four halls each night. Together with his brother Charles Ingle he wrote a number of highly successful coster songs to support his act including "Wot Cher! Knocked 'em in the Old Kent Road", "The Future Mrs. 'Awkins", "Appy 'Ampstead", and the melodrama "My Old Dutch". As well as in London, Chevalier became popular with audiences in the English provinces which he toured over the length of his career.

Albert Chevalier singing "My Old Dutch", 1899

During the 1910s Chevalier moved from comedy into music composition for straight plays. With a deteriorating health his final appearance was in My Old Dutch at the Lyceum Theatre in 1920. The play was based on Chevalier's own song of the same name and had some success. The play ran for over a year and Chevalier completed his last performance in November 1922. He died aged 62 and was buried in Abney Park cemetery in the same plot as his son and father-in-law George Leybourne.

== Biography ==
=== Early life ===
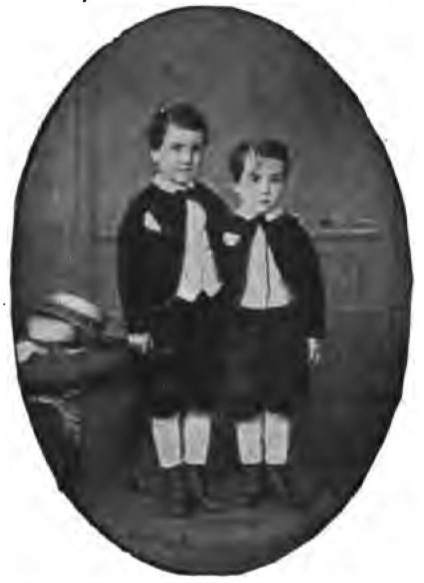
Chevalier (left) and his brother, Auguste in the 1870s

Chevalier was born at 17 St Ann's Villas, Royal Crescent, London. (Note: The Chevaliers counted the author G. A. Henty among their neighbours.) The son of Jean Onésime Chevalier, a French master at Kensington School, and his Welsh wife, Ellen Louisa Mathews; he had five siblings, two of whom died in infancy. His surviving brothers were Bertram, who in later life became a freelance photographer, and Auguste, who was better known as Charles Ingle, a composer of music hall songs. Chevalier was educated at Clanricarde College, Bayswater, and later, St Mary's College, Richmond. From a young age he showed an interest in acting and privately performed scenes from The September Gale for his family when he was eight years old.

In 1869 Chevalier made his amateur debut on the stage performing as Mark Anthony in Shakespeare's Julius Caesar, at Cornwall Hall in Notting Hill. A year later, on 17 August, and at the same venue, he performed some minor scenes from The September Gale, this time to a paying audience. When he was 14 he joined a local amateur dramatics group called the Roscius Dramatic Club, where he adopted the stage name, Albert Knight. When he left education, and to pay his drama fees, Chevalier took up a position as a clerk in a newspaper office, and then as a pupil teacher. It was in that job that his father introduced him to the playwright Dion Boucicault who arranged for a friend to mentor Chevalier's start in the theatre.

=== Theatrical beginnings ===
Madge Kendal and her husband William

In 1876 Chevalier organised two amateur performances of The Quack Doctor and Handy Andy both of which he produced and starred in. (Note: Chevalier's brother Charles played Squire O' Grady in Handy Andy while Chevalier himself took the title role. In The Quack Doctor Chevalier played Victor Dubois.) In 1877 Chevalier was engaged as an actor under the Bancrofts in London, and for some years played "legitimate" parts at the Court theatre and elsewhere. Chevalier's first professional appearance was alongside Madge Kendal and her husband William in An Unequal Match at the Prince of Wales's Theatre, London, on 29 September 1877; Chevalier appeared in the piece under his chosen stage name, Albert Knight. The following year the Kendals engaged him to play the part of "Sam Winkle" in the drama The Omadhaun Witness and then in a small role in the comic farce Checkmate.

The following January, and owing to Arthur Cecil's introduction of him to the Kendals, the show's producers, Chevalier toured for the first time in the highly successful melodrama Diplomacy in which he took the small role of "Antoine"; midway through the tour, Chevalier decided to change his stage name to his real moniker. The provincial press were complimentary of the show and singled out Chevalier in particular for his role. A critic for the Edinburgh Daily Review noted that although his part was small, "Mr. Chevalier's Antoine should be praised", while a theatre reviewer from the Liverpool Daily Post commented "The Parisian quaintness of Antoine, the "major domo of the Parisian ménage is exactly hit off by Mr. Chevalier."

Chevalier remained until the end of the tour, after which he was engaged to appear at the Court Theatre, London in the comedy A Scrap of Paper in which he played the role of "Jones". The show opened on 6 January 1879 and was, according to Chavalier's biographer Brian Daley, "met with unquestioned success". The following month he took a minor part in The Ladies Battle in which he took the role of "Montrichard", a characterisation which Daley describes as being "inimitable". Through the summer of 1879 he undertook a series of small roles for the Kendals in Liverpool. Towards the end of that year he was chosen by the Kendals to understudy for the main actors in the short plays M. le Duc, The Queen's Shilling and A Regular Fix.

=== 1880s ===
In February 1881 Chevalier was chosen to form part of a touring company headed by the cellist and composer Auguste van Biene on a provincial tour of England. The classical plays, La Somnambula and The Grand Duchess were unsuccessful and the company were forced to raise funds by staging small concerts in rundown theatres in nearby towns. It was Chevalier's job to sing comic-songs, accompanied by a backdrop of classical music. They were booed and hissed from the audience who were leaving the hall rapidly. At the last minute Chevalier stepped in and performed a short ditty as "Sammy Stammers" which, as the title suggests, was a character with a stutter who sang comic songs. The audience believed his affliction and ridiculed him as they left. Unperturbed, van Biene staged Don Giovanni the following night, but the lead singer failed to show. Chevalier offered his services to van Biene and assumed the role with the added promise that he could make the show his own. During a break, Chevalier borrowed a box of props from the storeroom and went back on to impersonate the music hall star George H. Chirgwin. The show went well and he stayed with the company for the remainder of the tour.

A few months later Chevalier was recruited for a short tour of Scotland. Among the places he visited were Glasgow, Coatbridge and Greenock the latter in which he enjoyed much success in the burlesques False Glitter and the show's after piece, Peebles.

Chevalier was engaged to appear in Arthur Pinero's The Magistrate in 1885 and The Schoolmistress the following year. In 1889 he became the principal comedian at the Avenue Theatre, predominantly in burlesques. Throughout the 1880s he was a prolific writer of songs, including "Our 'armonic Club", which was written for the burlesque Aladdin, or, The Wonderful Scamp in around 1888.

=== Introduction to music hall ===
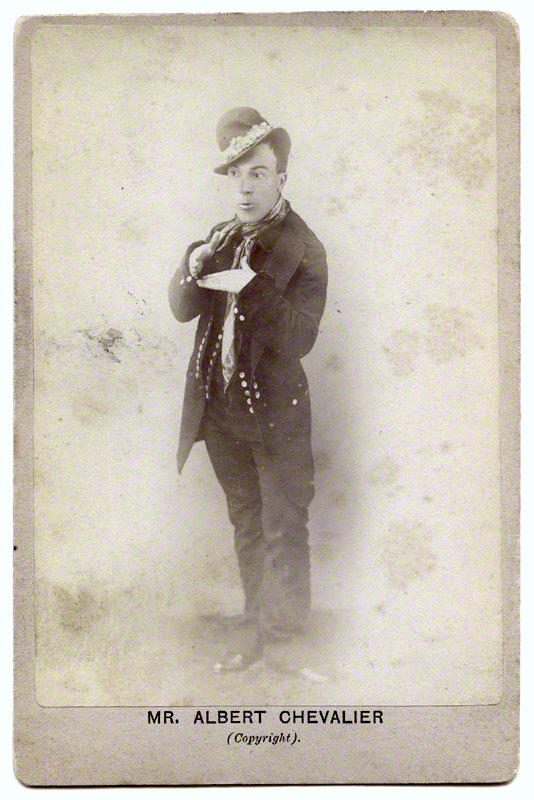
Chevalier in "coster" costume, c. 1890

On 5 February 1891 Chevalier appeared for the first time on the music hall stage at the New London Pavilion, Piccadilly Circus. For his costume, Chevalier opted for a peaked cap, a check jacket, a necktie, and a pair of bell-bottomed trousers. In preparation, he sought advice from Marie Lloyd, an already established music hall singer in her own right and who formed part of the audience on his opening night. Also in the auditorium was a curious Lewis Carroll, a staunch opposer of music hall entertainment, who had come to hear about Chevalier's debut through friends. Carroll had earlier been impressed by Chevalier's performances in the straight theatre. Writing in his memoirs, Carroll thought was "decidedly good as an actor; but as a comic singer (with considerable powers of pathos as well), he [was] quite first rate."

He appeared in character as a costermonger, and sang "The Coster's Serenade", "The Nasty Way 'e Sez It", and "Funny Without Being Vulgar".

Chevalier based his act upon the performances of Alfred Vance, a cockney comedian from the beginnings of the English music hall tradition. Chevalier also drew inspiration from the London characters of Charles Dickens, including Sam Weller, whom Chevalier had played unsuccessfully in a touring show. For the tour, he updated the character by modernising the dialogue and mixing it with the performance style used by mid-century cockney performers, including Vance. The changes resulted in Chevalier inventing a new, sentimental variation of Vance's "criminal coster", which was loosely based on a working-class Londoner.

Chevalier's failure in the theatre was instrumental in his decision to start performing in music hall. The move into music hall was considered by some critics to be unusual for an actor in legitimate theatre, but it was welcomed by music hall syndicates who were eager to appeal to as many different audiences as they could. Chevalier justified his move by arguing that audiences were ready for something different and benefitted from support by George Bernard Shaw and the poet Arthur Symons.

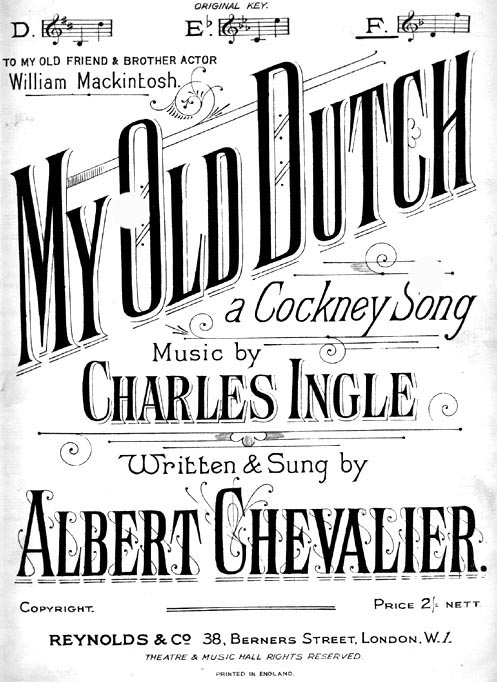
"My Old Dutch" from 1892

From the early 1890s Chevalier agreed to only work in the major London music-halls, which he did for over a seven-year period, often performing at three or four halls each night. Together with his brother Charles he wrote a number of highly successful coster songs including "Wot Cher! Knocked 'em in the Old Kent Road", "The Future Mrs. 'Awkins", "Appy 'Ampstead", and the melodrama "My Old Dutch". As well as in London, Chevalier appeared in various concert halls throughout the English provinces, as he refused to appear in music halls outside of the capital.

During the 1890s, Chevalier became a highly popular performer on the music hall stage, rivalled only by Dan Leno, whose comedy act was based much more on gritty working-class realism than Chevalier's aspirational romanticism.

In 1893, Chevalier undertook managerial responsibilities at the Trocadero Music Hall; the venture proved disastrous, and left him with a £10,000 debt. On 8 October 1894, he married Florence Isabel Leybourne (b. 1868/9) who was the daughter of the music hall performer George Leybourne; they had one son. Chevalier travelled to New York in 1896 where he repeated his success at Koster and Bial's Music Hall. Despite suffering stage fright, the appearance was a success for the comedian, and he was hailed as one of the city's idols.

Upon his return from America and Canada in 1896, Chevalier decided to reduce his music hall appearances owing to the unpredictability and inattentiveness of the genre's audiences, which he came to dislike. From the paying public's point of view, his style of humour had become common place within the music hall. His biggest rival was Gus Elen who had developed a more complex and comical alternative to Chevalier's. Instead, Chevalier decided to concentrate his time on creating comic characters which he used in one-man sketches which he called his "recitals". To keep within the audiences gaze, he still performed occasional coster songs and performed them alongside his characterisations. The characters included a country vicar in "Our Bazaar", a struggling actor in "A Fallen Star", and a west-country peasant in "E Can't Take a Roise out of oi". While none of these pieces earned the kind of success that his coster songs had achieved, Chevalier maintained a successful solo career performing them. His annual engagement at the Queen's Hall in London of twice-daily performances began in 1899 and ran in excess of 1000 performances.

Chevalier returned to America in 1906 for a six-week tour with the French singer Yvette Guilbert who described her co-star as being "more skilful than actually talented". During the 1900s he became one of the highest paid music hall stars in London, earning up to £450 per week. He played the title role in J. M. Barrie's Pantaloon (1906) and in the same year appeared with the French chanteuse Yvette Guilbert.

=== Final years and death ===
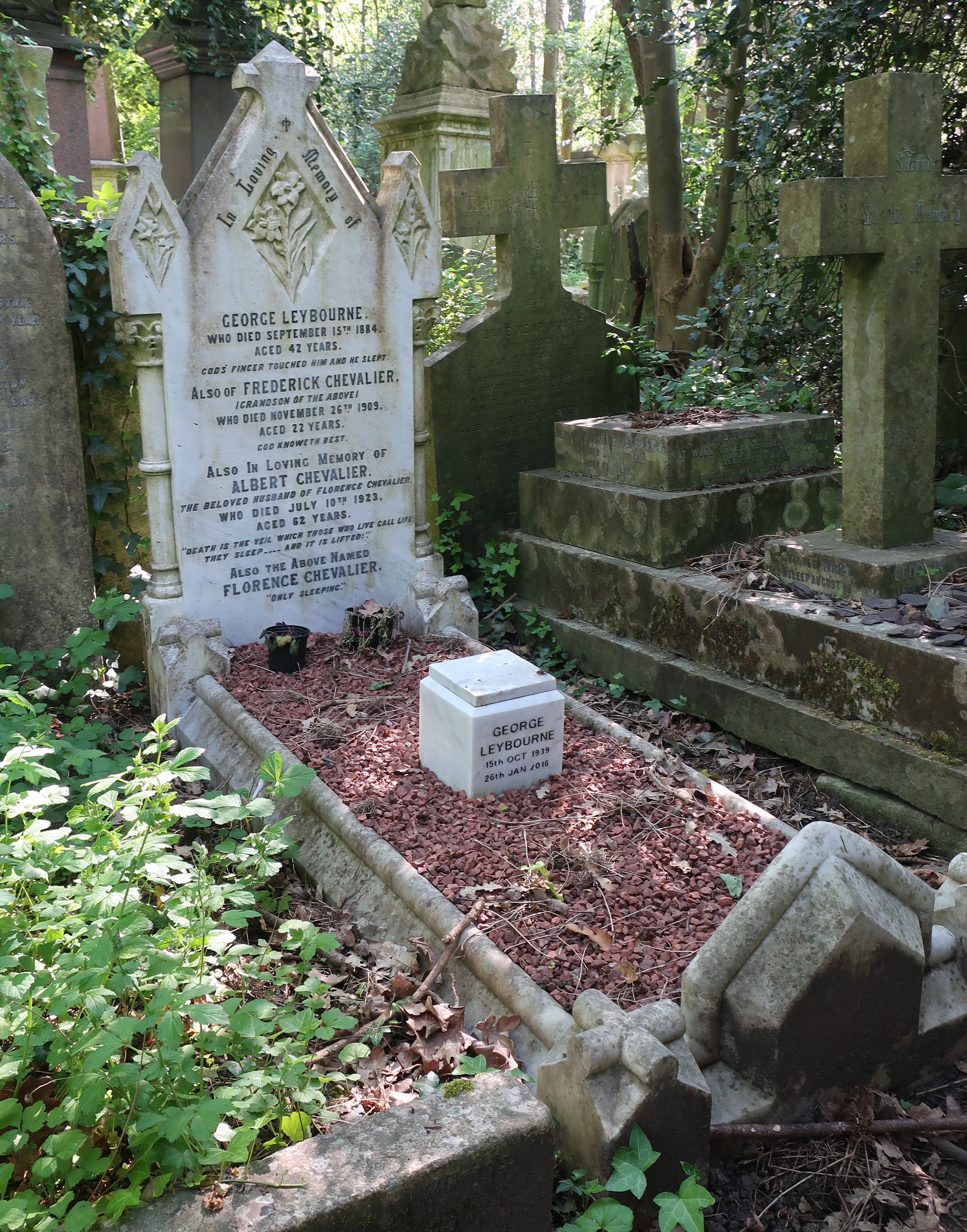
Grave of George Leybourne, Albert Chevalier, and other family members in Abney Park Cemetery

Chevalier continued to compose songs and perform in straight plays. His final appearance was at the Lyceum Theatre in 1920 in My Old Dutch, which Chevalier co-wrote with Arthur Shirley. The play was based on Chevalier's own song of the same name and had some success despite, according to the biographer Simon Featherstone, its by then "dated sentimentality". The play ran for over a year and Chevalier completed his last performance in November 1922.

Chevalier died on 10 July 1923 at his home, Lake House, at 38 Woodberry Down, Stoke Newington at the age of 62. He was buried in Abney Park Cemetery on 13 July in the same plot as his son and father-in-law George Leybourne. He was survived by his wife.

== Legacy ==
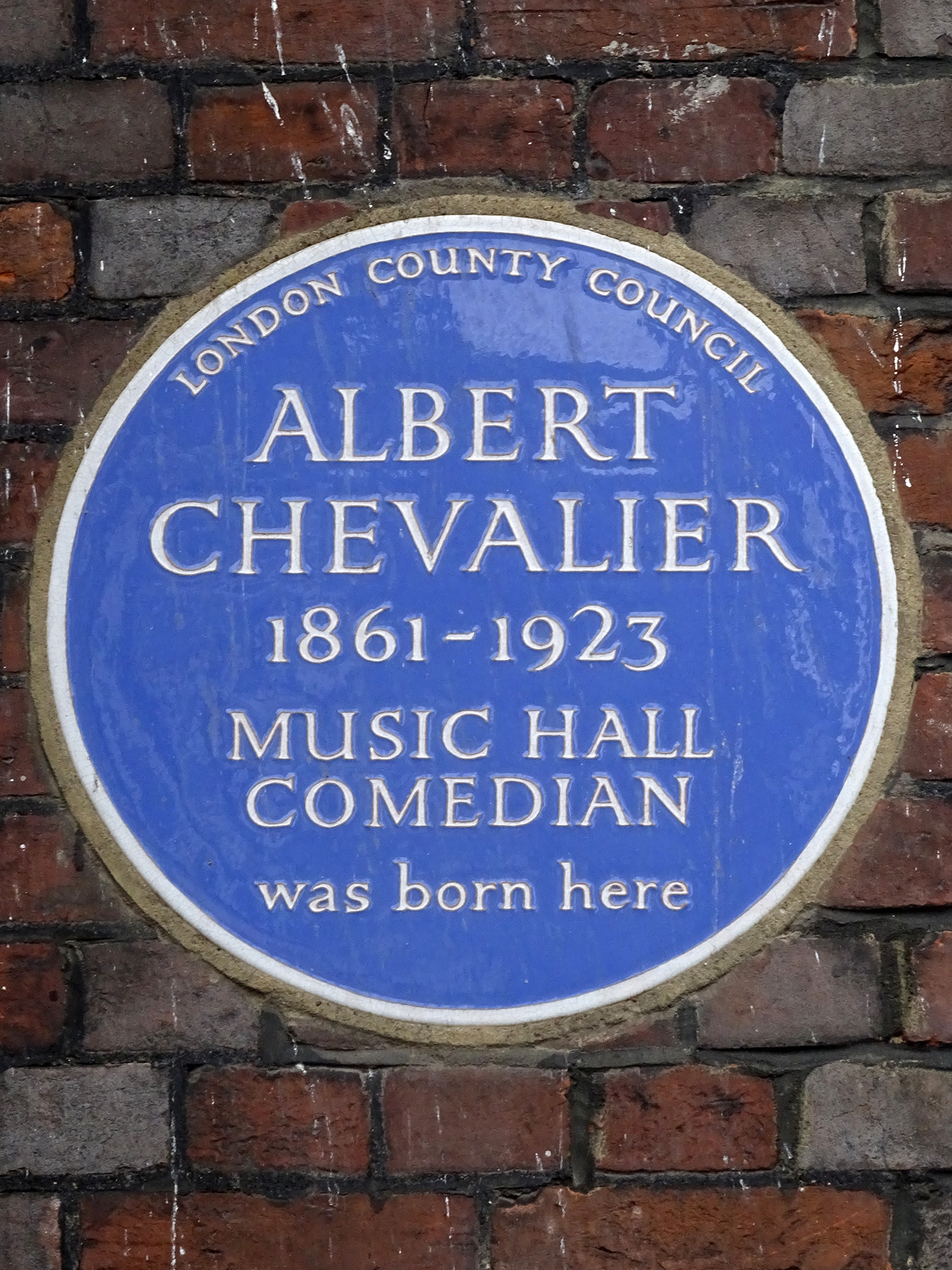
Blue plaque in St Ann's Villas commemorating Chevalier's birthplace.

Albert Chevalier was in some ways an innovative popular performer who established the coster style of performance, wrote his own material, and exploited the commercial opportunities of the developing music-halls in the 1890s. He made commercial recordings of his songs, and appeared in several early films, including the 1915 British silent My Old Dutch.

The English theatre critic Clement Scott noted Chevalier for his ability to interact with his audiences on a working class level and to modernise the music hall: "Albert Chevalier has had much – very much – to do with the wholesome reform of the modern music hall. An artist by instinct, he left the stage and, with laudable courage, he gave his talent to the common people. He understood that there was a warm heart under a corduroy jacket, a vein of sentiment even in the lowly costermonger and he gave us the ballads which are now household words." The writer Richard Anthony Baker highlighted the "snobbery" of some theatre critics who thought that music hall entertainment was "innately inferior to the legitimate theatre". However, Baker opined that although Chevalier was an "entertainer and lyricist of considerable talent", the sentimentality of his act would, when compared to modern entertainment, be thought of as outdated." In 2026 a new development of retail units and apartments above were named 'Chevalier House' in commemoration of him.

== Notes and references ==
Notes

== Sources ==
- Baker, Richard, Anthony (2014). British Music Hall: An Illustrated History. South Yorkshire: Pen & Sword History. ISBN 978-1-78383-118-0.
- Chevalier, Albert (1901). Before I Forget: The Autobiography of a Chevalier d'Industrie. London: T. Fisher Unwin.
- Collingwood, Stuart Dodgson (1898). The Life and Letters of Lewis Carroll. London: T. Fisher Unwin. ISBN 978-0-559-12572-0.
- Daley, Brian (1895). Albert Chevalier: A Record by Himself. London: John MacQueen. ISBN 978-1-245-06056-1.
- Guilbert, Yvette (1929). The Song of My Life: My Memories. London: G. G. Harrap & Company, Limited. ASIN B00085Y7GK.
