= Elias Dayton =

American politician (1737–1807)

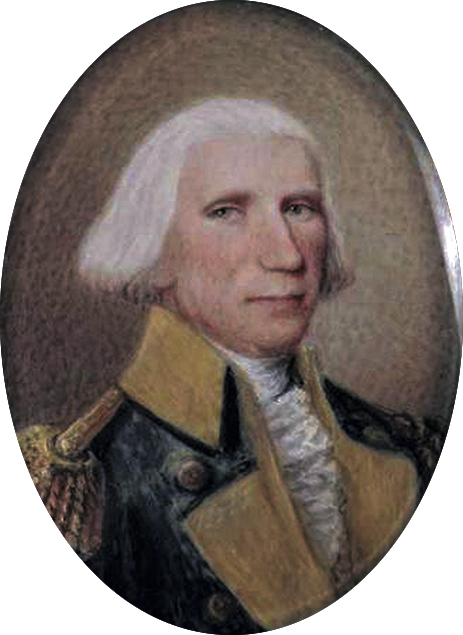
- Born: May 1, 1737; Elizabeth, New Jersey, British America
- Died: October 22, 1807 (aged 70); Elizabeth, New Jersey, U.S.
- Children: 2, including Jonathan

Elias Dayton (May 1, 1737 – October 22, 1807) was an American merchant and military officer who served as captain and colonel of the local militia and in 1783 rose to become a brigadier general during the American Revolutionary War. Afterward, he became the Mayor of Elizabethtown, New Jersey and served in the New Jersey General Assembly. He was the father of U.S. Constitution signer Jonathan Dayton.

== Early and family life ==
Dayton was born in Elizabeth, Province of New Jersey. He married Hannah Rolfe in 1757, and they had two sons, Jonathan Dayton (1760–1824), who would become the youngest signatory of the U.S. Constitution, and Elias Bayley (Boudinot) Dayton (1764–1846).

== Career ==
During the French and Indian War, Dayton served first as a lieutenant and then as a captain in the New Jersey militia. During Pontiac's War, in 1760, he served as a commander in the Detroit region. After the wars, Dayton returned to Elizabethtown, New Jersey, where he became a mechanic, merchant and colonial official.

In 1774 the First Continental Congress called on the colonies to resist Parliament's recent tax policy by joining in an association to boycott goods imported from Britain. Dayton allied himself with the local revolutionary movement and served on Elizabethtown's enforcement committee. When the state turned against Royal Governor William Franklin in 1775, the New Jersey's Provincial Congress chose Dayton to lead the 3rd New Jersey Regiment. In July 1775 he and William Alexander, Lord Stirling, led militia forces which captured a British transport off Elizabethtown.

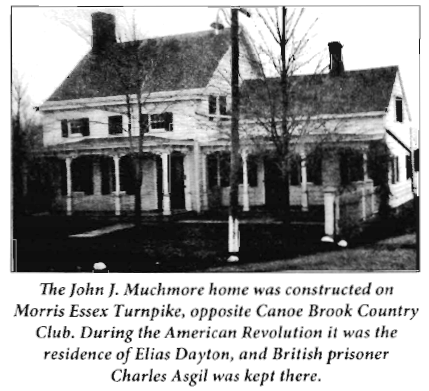
Colonel Elias Dayton's House in Chatham New Jersey, with permission from the Summit Historical Society.

In the spring of 1776 Dayton (as colonel) and his 3rd New Jersey troops (including his young son Jonathan, who would become the regimental paymaster by August) were sent to support an invasion of Canada. However, they were diverted to New York's Mohawk Valley where Colonel Dayton constructed fortifications to protect the colonists from Loyalist and Indian insurrections. These fortifications included Fort Dayton in what is now Herkimer, New York and Fort Schuyler (now called Fort Stanwix but was allowed to go to ruin after the French and Indian War) in what is now Rome, New York.

In 1777, Dayton set up a spy network for George Washington on Staten Island to work in parallel with an established American intelligence agent, John Mersereau.

In December 1778, New Jersey named Dayton as a delegate to the Continental Congress, but he remained with the army and did not attend the Congress. He helped suppress a mutiny of the New Jersey line in 1781, and was promoted to brigadier general in the Continental Army in 1783, and later to major general of militia. He had a prominent role in the battles of Springfield, Monmouth, Brandywine and Yorktown, and had horses shot under him at Germantown (outside Philadelphia), at Springfield, and at Crosswick's Bridge.

Dayton helped establish The Society of the Cincinnati in the state of New Jersey as an original member, and served as the President of the New Jersey Society from its foundation until his death. He served in the New Jersey General Assembly from 1791 to 1792 and 1794–1796, and was mayor of Elizabethtown from 1796 to 1805.

== Death and legacy ==
He died at age 70 and was interred at the First Presbyterian Churchyard in Elizabeth, New Jersey. The city of Dayton, Ohio would be named after his son Jonathan Dayton.

== Notes ==
- United States Congress. "Elias Dayton (id: D000164)". Biographical Directory of the United States Congress. Retrieved on 2009–5–18
- Mahoney, Henry Thayer and Marjorie Locke Mahoney. Gallantry in Action: A Biographic Dictionary of Espionage in the American Revolutionary War. Lanham, MD: University Press of America, Inc., 1999. ISBN 978-0-7618-1479-5.
