= Lee Shumway =

American actor (1884–1959)

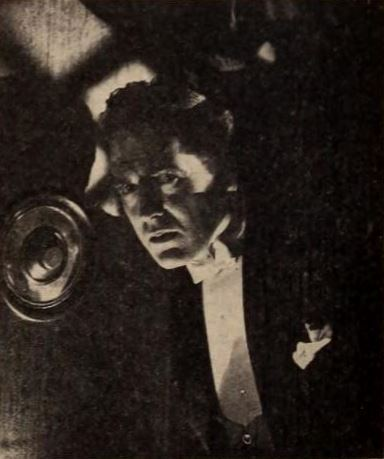
- Shumway in Wanted at Headquarters (1920)
- Born: March 4, 1884; Salt Lake City, Utah, US
- Died: January 4, 1959 (aged 74); Los Angeles, California, US
- Occupation: Actor
- Years active: 1909–1953

Lee Shumway (March 4, 1884 – January 4, 1959), born Leonard Charles Shumway, was an American actor. He appeared in more than 400 films between 1909 and 1953. He was born in Salt Lake City, Utah, and died in Los Angeles, California.

== Selected filmography ==
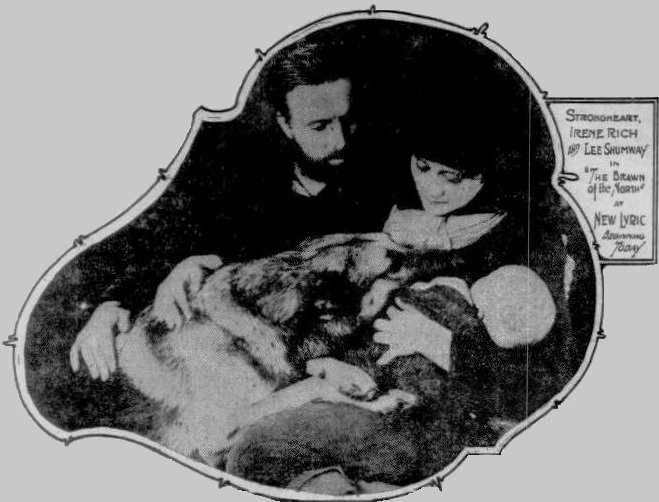
Newspaper ad for Brawn of the North (1922) with Lee Shumway, Irene Rich, and Strongheart the dog

- Saved from the Harem (1915) - Lt. Robert Brice
- Behind the Lines (1916) - Jose
- The Conspiracy (1916, Short) - Hodges
- Guilty (1916, Short) - Captain
- The Gates of Doom (1917) - Francis Duane
- The Plow Woman (1917)
- The Phantom's Secret (1917)
- Perils of the Secret Service (1917, Serial) - Count Stefan (Episodes #2, 3)
- Two-Gun Betty (1918)
- Rustling A Bride (1919)
- The Siren's Song (1919)
- The Speed Maniac (1919)
- The Love Hunger (1919)
- Eve in Exile (1919)
- When Dawn Came (1920)
- The Gamesters (1920)
- To Please One Woman (1920)
- Society Secrets (1921)
- The Big Adventure (1921)
- The Torrent (1921)
- Conflict (1921)
- The Lure of Jade (1921)
- Step on It! (1922)
- Over the Border (1922)
- Brawn of the North (1922)
- The Gunfighter (1923)
- Hearts Aflame (1923)
- The Lone Star Ranger (1923)
- The Yankee Consul (1924)
- The Night Hawk (1924)
- The Vagabond Trail (1924)
- The Bowery Bishop (1924)
- American Manners (1924)
- Introduce Me (1925)
- The Price of Success (1925)
- The Air Mail (1925)
- The Danger Signal (1925)
- The Texas Bearcat (1925)
- The Bad Lands (1925)
- Smilin' at Trouble (1925)
- The Man from Red Gulch (1925)
- Whispering Canyon (1926)
- The Sign of the Claw (1926)
- Glenister of the Mounted (1926)
- The Checkered Flag (1926)
- The Bat (1926)
- Let It Rain (1927)
- Outlaws of Red River (1927)
- Great Mail Robbery (1927)
- His Foreign Wife (1927)
- South Sea Love (1927)
- Hit of the Show (1928)
- A Million for Love (1928)
- Beyond London Lights (1928)
- Son of the Golden West (1928)
- The House of Scandal (1928)
- Queen of the Night Clubs (1929)
- Evangeline (1929)
- So This Is College (1929)
- Night Parade (1929)
- The Lone Star Ranger (1930)
- The Lone Defender (1930)
- Show Girl in Hollywood (1930)
- Sweet Mama (1930)
- The Santa Fe Trail (1930)
- The Widow from Chicago (1930)
- Partners (1932)
- Girl o' My Dreams (1934)
- Million Dollar Baby (1934)
- Men of the Night (1934)
- The Mysterious Mr. Wong (1934)
- Among the Missing (1934)
- Branded a Coward (1935)
- Society Doctor (1935)
- The Mystery Man (1935)
- The Preview Murder Mystery (1936)
- Go-Get-'Em, Haines (1936)
- Wives Never Know (1936)
- Killer at Large (1936)
- Shakedown (1936)
- Song of the Trail (1936)
- The Magnificent Brute (1936)
- Find the Witness (1937)
- Hollywood Cowboy (1937)
- Windjammer (1937)
- Two Gun Law (1937)
- Hollywood Round-Up (1937)
- Outlaws of the Prairie (1937)
- Painted Desert (1938)
- Frontiers of '49 (1939)
- The Night Riders (1939)
- Young as You Feel (1940)
- Deadwood Dick (1940)
- The Long Voyage Home (1940)
- Prairie Pioneers (1941)
- Two Gun Sheriff (1941)
- Murder by Invitation (1941)
- No Greater Sin (1941)
- Pacific Blackout (1941)
- Arizona Terrors (1942)
- Stand By All Networks (1942)
- Captain Midnight (1942)
- Jesse James, Jr. (1942)
- Priorities on Parade (1942)
- Dawn on the Great Divide (1942)
- Dead Man's Gulch (1943)
- Ladies of Washington (1944)
- Flame of Barbary Coast (1945)
- Oregon Trail (1945)
- Roll on Texas Moon (1946)
- Savage Frontier (1953)
