= The Love Master (film) =

1924 film by Laurence Trimble

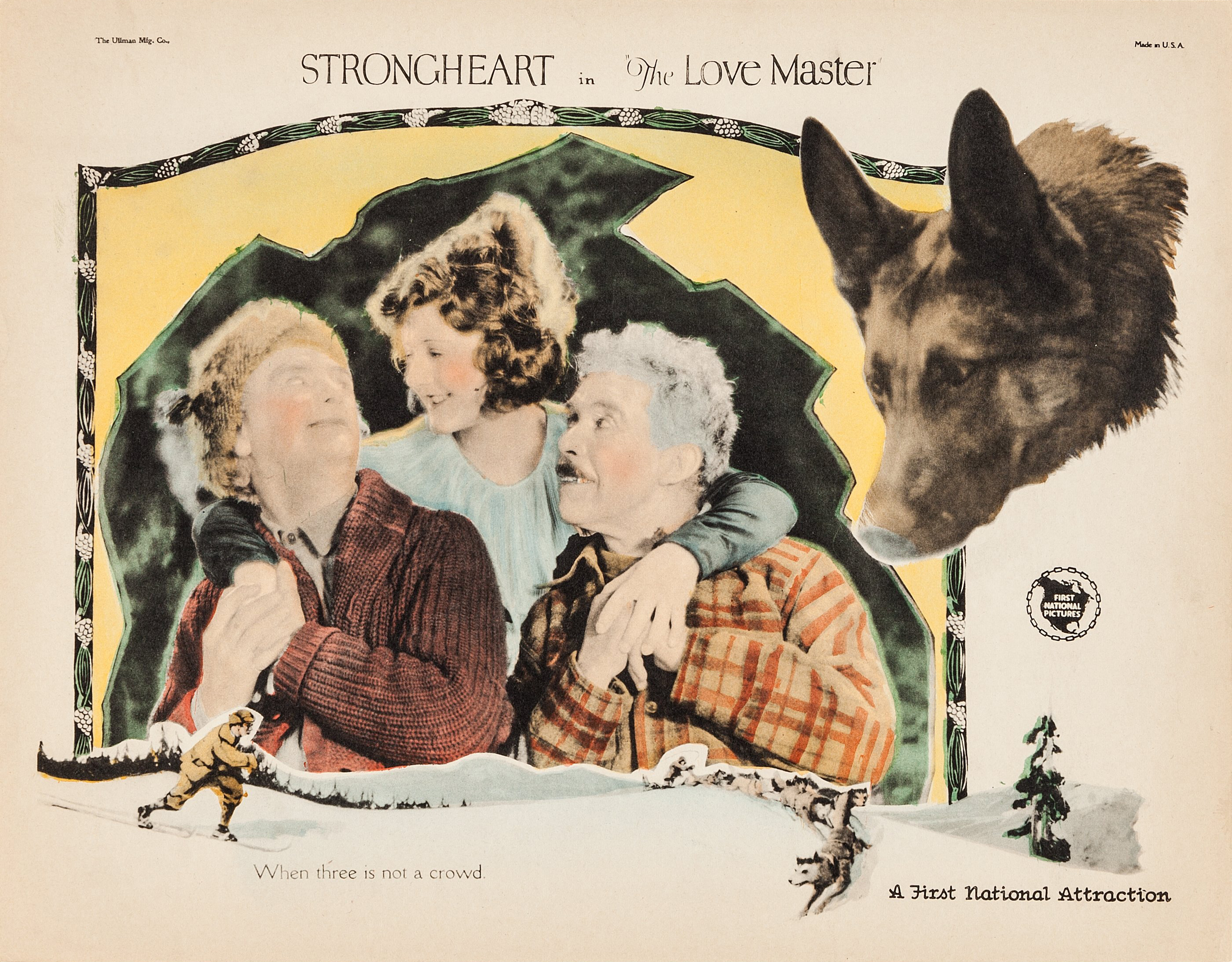
- Lobby card
- Directed by: Laurence Trimble
- Written by: Laurence Trimble (story, scenario); Jane Murfin (story)
- Produced by: Laurence Trimble; Jane Murfin
- Starring: Strongheart; Lillian Rich
- Cinematography: Charles Dreyer; Glen Gano; John Leezer
- Edited by: Cyril Gardner
- Production company: Trimble-Murfin Productions
- Distributed by: Associated First National
- Release date: February 1924
- Running time: 70 minutes; 7 reels
- Country: United States
- Language: Silent (English intertitles)

The Love Master is a 1924 American silent family drama film starring canine star Strongheart and actress Lillian Rich, directed by Laurence Trimble. The film survives in a French archive that has been held at https://www.cinematheque.fr/ since 2006.

== Plot ==
As described in a film magazine review, Sally, an attractive young woman, is the only white woman in the isolated northern settlement. David, a young clerk in her uncle's general store, loves her and is worthy of her. Jean Le Roy, a dishonest fur trader, hopes to win her. When David falls ill from overwork and anxiety, Sally nurses him back to health. She also helps him win the yearly dog race with his German Shepherd Strongheart, which gives him sufficient money to marry her and return with her to the United States. The canine story involving Strongheart and his mate generally follows that of the human couple, often with the dogs mimicking their gestures.

== Cast ==
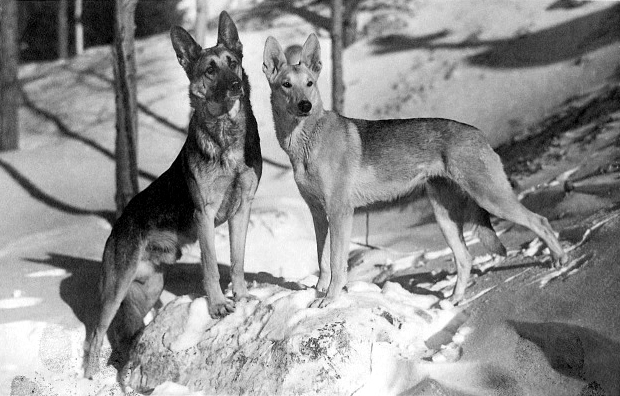
Strongheart and Lady Jule in The Love Master

- Strongheart as Strongheart the dog
- Lady Jule as The Fawn
- Lillian Rich as Sally
- Harold Austin as David
- Hal Wilson as Alec McLeod
- Walter Perry as Andrew Thomas Francis Joseph Mulligan
- Joseph Barrell as The Ghost
- Jack Richardson (uncredited)
