= Flapper Wives =

1924 film

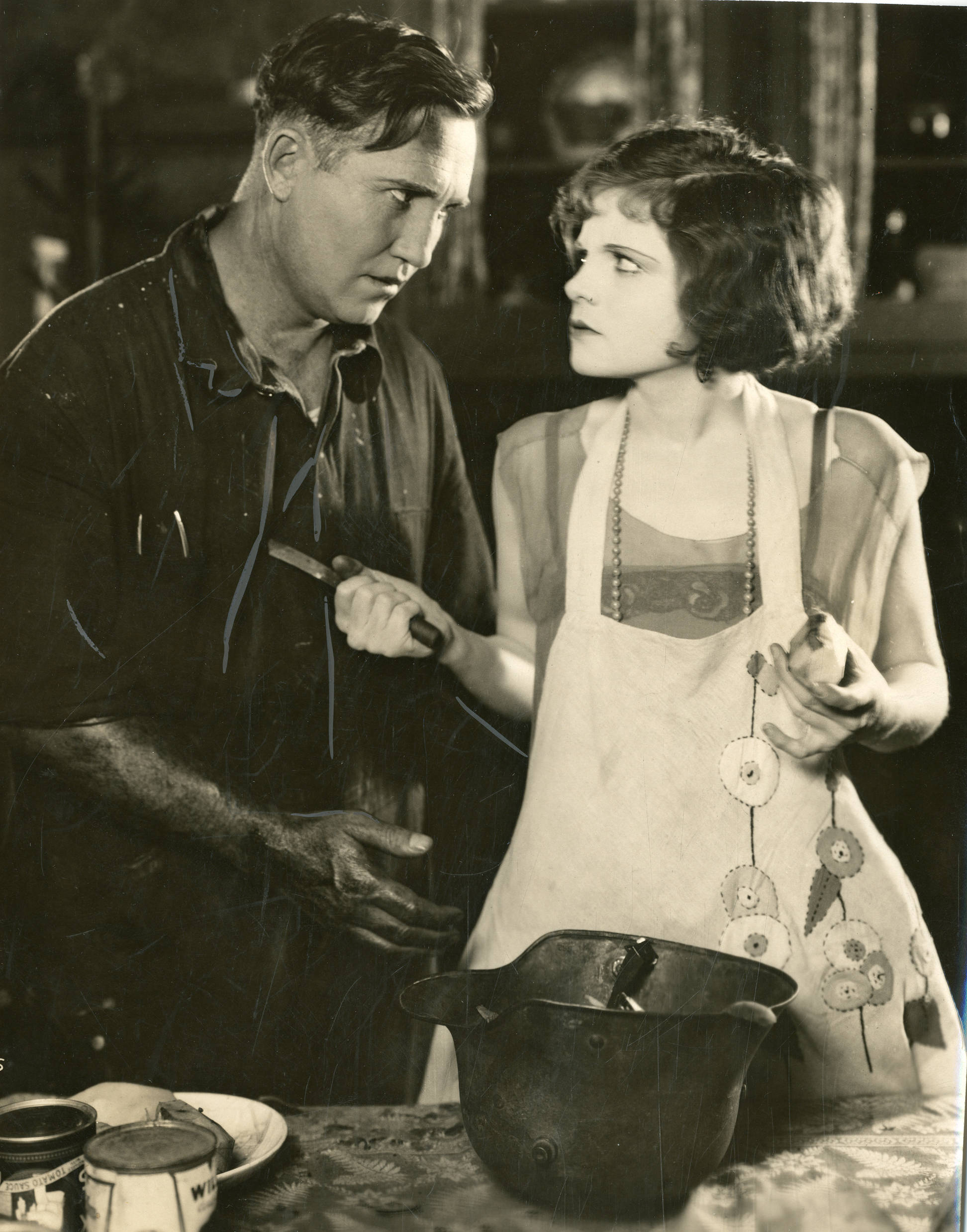
- Film still
- Directed by: Jane Murfin; Justin H. McCloskey (assistant director)
- Written by: Laurence Trimble
- Based on: Flapper Wives by Jane Cowl and Jane Murfin
- Produced by: Jane Murfin; Laurence Trimble
- Starring: May Allison; Rockliffe Fellowes; Vera Reynolds; Edward Everett Horton; Brawn
- Cinematography: Connie De Roo; King D. Gray
- Production company: Trimble-Murfin Productions
- Distributed by: Selznick Pictures
- Release date: February 23, 1924
- Running time: 7 reels
- Country: United States
- Language: Silent (English intertitles)

Flapper Wives is a 1924 American silent drama film directed by Jane Murfin and starring May Allison, Rockliffe Fellowes, and Vera Reynolds. It is the only film Murfin directed; Justin H. McCloskey is credited as assistant director. The film was produced by Trimble-Murfin Productions during Murfin's partnership with Laurence Trimble, and distributed by Selznick Pictures.

== Cast ==
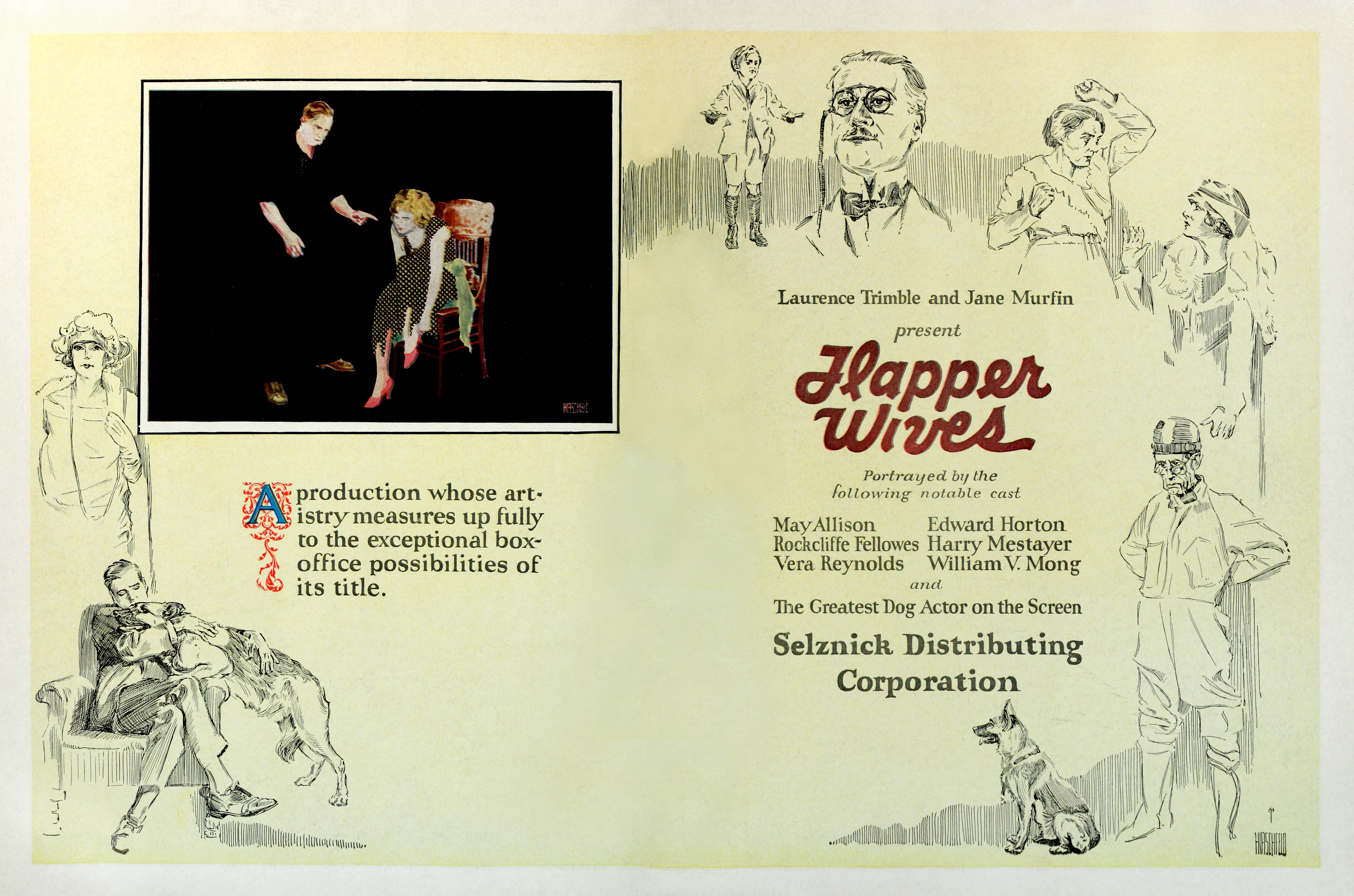
Trade magazine advertisement by Al Hirschfeld

- May Allison as Claudia Bigelow
- Rockliffe Fellowes as Stephen Carey
- Vera Reynolds as Sadie Callahan
- Edward Everett Horton as Vincent Platt
- Harry Mestayer as Charles Bigelow
- William V. Mong as Enoch Metcalf
- Eddie Phillips as Tony
- Tom O'Brien as Tim Callahan
- Evelyn Selbie as Hulda
- Robert Dudley as Lem
- Stanley Goethals as Jimsy
- J.C. Fowler as Dr. Oliver Lee
- Brawn as Wolf

Brawn, a male German Shepherd, was sired by Strongheart.

== Preservation ==
With no copies of Flapper Wives located in any film archives, it is a lost film.

== Bibliography ==
- Rainey, Buck. Sweethearts of the Sage: Biographies and Filmographies of 258 Actresses Appearing in Western Movies. McFarland & Company, 1992. ISBN 0899505651
