= White Fang (1925 film) =

1925 film

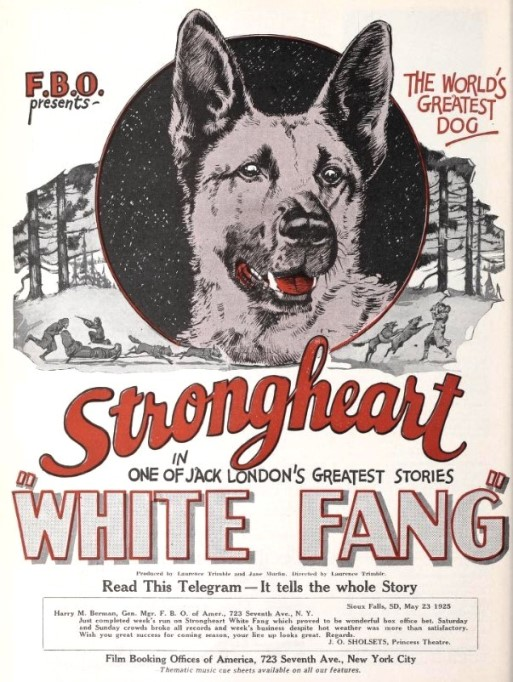
- Advertisement
- Directed by: Laurence Trimble
- Written by: Jane Murfin
- Based on: White Fang by Jack London
- Starring: Theodore von Eltz; Ruth Dwyer; Matthew Betz
- Cinematography: Glen Gano; King D. Gray; John W. Leezer
- Production company: Robertson-Cole Pictures Corporation
- Distributed by: Film Booking Offices of America; Wardour Films (UK)
- Release date: May 24, 1925
- Running time: 60 minutes
- Country: United States
- Language: Silent (English intertitles)

White Fang is a 1925 American silent Western film directed by Laurence Trimble and featuring Theodore von Eltz, Ruth Dwyer, and Matthew Betz. It was produced by FBO Pictures as a starring vehicle for Strongheart, a German Shepherd who appeared in a number of films during the decade. It is based on the 1906 novel White Fang by Jack London.

== Plot ==
As described in a film magazine review, Joe Holland, superintendent of the Lucky 13 mine, saves his sick friend, Weadon Scott, from a pack of wolves. He discovers that someone is stealing gold ore from the mine. Frank Wilde, one of the foremen, buys White Fang, a man-killing dog. He enters him into a dogfight against Cherokee, a bulldog. White Fang is rescued when Weadon enters. Holland's daughter Mollie marries Frank. She then discovers that her husband is stealing gold ore from her father's mine. Her husband then kills Joe Holland and beats up Weadon when White Fang comes rushing in. White Fang kills the villain. With Mollie now a widow, Weadon marries Mollie.

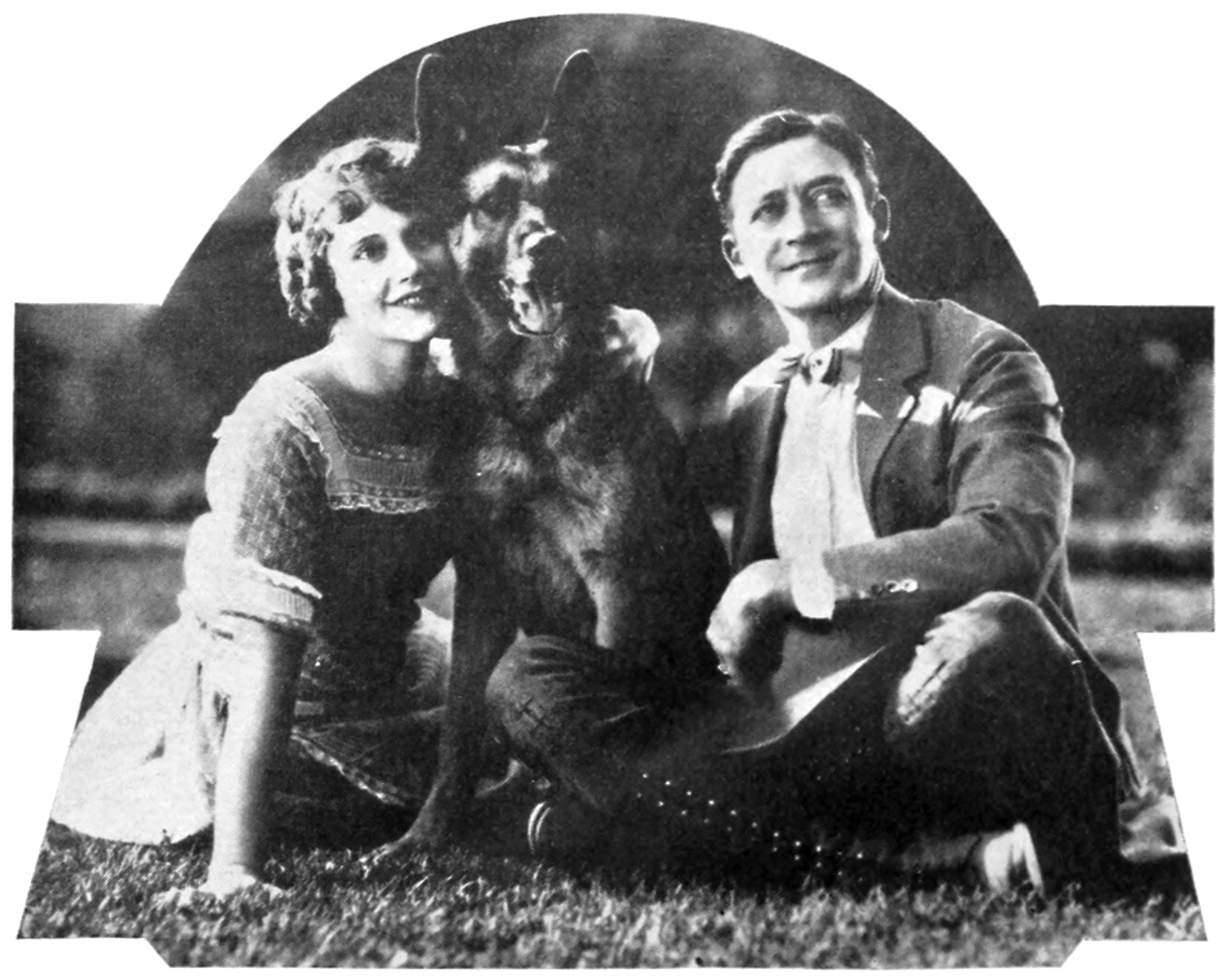
The cast of White Fang — Ruth Dwyer, Strongheart, and Theodore von Eltz

== Cast ==
- Strongheart as White Fang
- Theodore von Eltz as Weadon Scott
- Ruth Dwyer as Mollie Holland
- Matthew Betz as Frank Wilde
- Walter Perry as Joe Holland
- Charles Murray as Judson Black
- Tom O'Brien as Matt
- Steve Murphy as 'Beauty' Smith
- John Burch as Bill Morry
- Margaret McWade as Mrs. Black

== Bibliography ==
- Connelly, Robert B. The Silents: Silent Feature Films, 1910-36, Volume 40, Issue 2. December Press, 1998.
- Goble, Alan. The Complete Index to Literary Sources in Film. Walter de Gruyter, 1999.
- Munden, Kenneth White. The American Film Institute Catalog of Motion Pictures Produced in the United States, Part 1. University of California Press, 1997.
