= The Silent Call (1921 film) =

1921 film

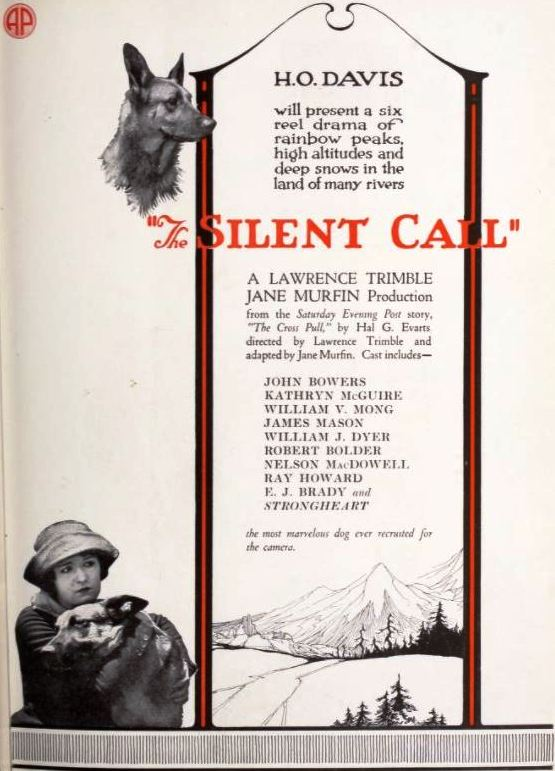
- Directed by: Laurence Trimble
- Written by: Jane Murfin
- Based on: The Cross Pull; 1919 novel in The Saturday Evening Post by Hal G. Evarts
- Produced by: H.O. Davis
- Starring: John Bowers; Kathryn McGuire; William Dyer
- Cinematography: Charles Dreyer; Glen Gano
- Production company: H.O. Davis Productions
- Distributed by: Associated First National Pictures
- Release date: November 7, 1921
- Running time: 70 minutes
- Country: United States
- Languages: Silent; English intertitles

The Silent Call is a 1921 American silent adventure film directed by Laurence Trimble and featuring John Bowers, Kathryn McGuire and William Dyer. It was produced as a vehicle for the canine star Strongheart who appeared in several silent films. Strongheart was trained by Trimble.

== Cast ==
- Strongheart the Dog as Flash
- John Bowers as Clark Moran
- Kathryn McGuire as Betty Houston
- William Dyer as Ash Brent
- Jim Mason as Luther Nash
- Nelson McDowell as Dad Kinney
- Ed Brady as Jimmy the Dud
- Robert Bolder as James Houston

== Bibliography ==
- Connelly, Robert B. The Silents: Silent Feature Films, 1910-36, Volume 40, Issue 2. December Press, 1998.
