= Brawn of the North =

1922 film by Jane Murfin, Laurence Trimble

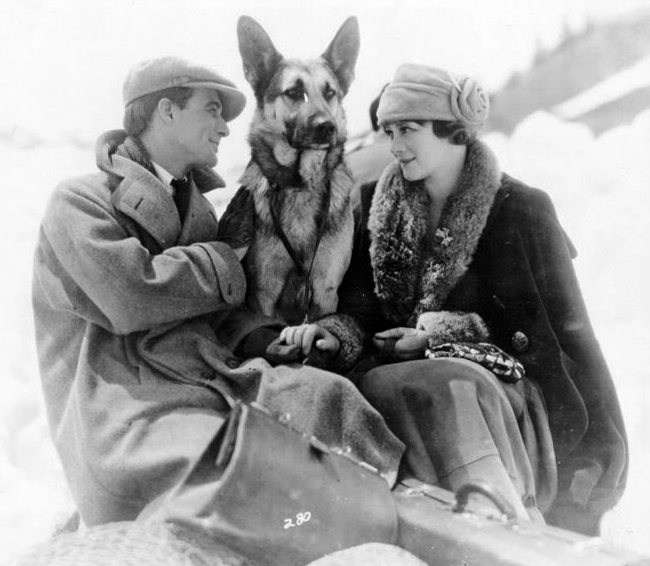
- Lee Shumway, Strongheart and Irene Rich
- Directed by: Laurence Trimble
- Written by: Philip Hubbard (continuity)
- Story by: Laurence Trimble; Jane Murfin
- Produced by: Laurence Trimble; Jane Murfin
- Starring: Strongheart; Irene Rich
- Cinematography: Charles Dreyer
- Production company: Trimble-Murfin Productions
- Distributed by: Associated First National Pictures
- Release date: November 12, 1922 (U.S.)
- Running time: 8 reels
- Country: United States
- Language: Silent (English intertitles)

Brawn of the North is a lost 1922 American silent Northwoods film. It was produced by Laurence Trimble and Jane Murfin with release through Associated First National Pictures. The film stars Irene Rich and a new canine find by Trimble named Strongheart. This was the second film starring the dog after his introduction in The Silent Call (1921). The film is now considered lost.

== Cast ==
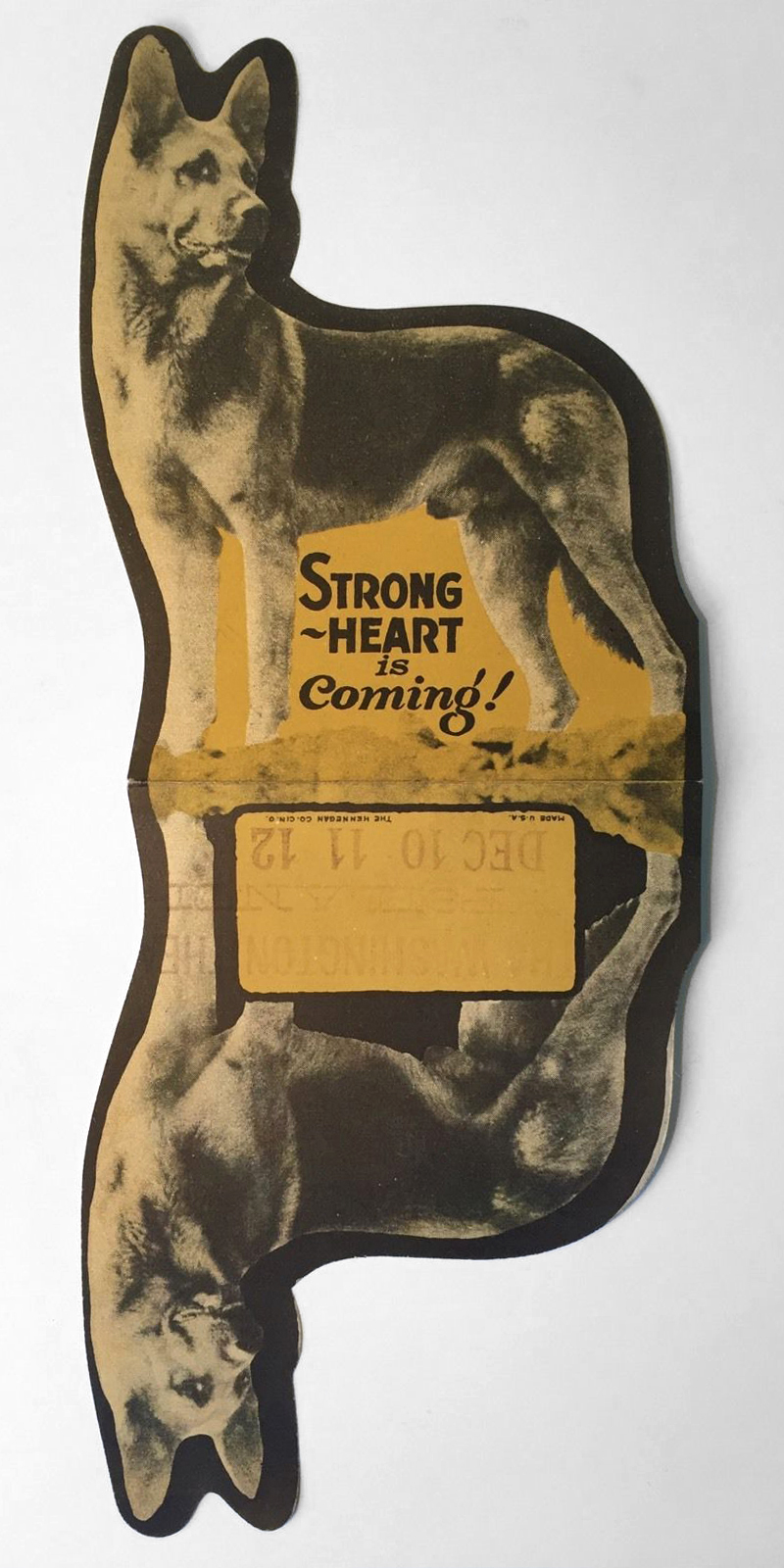
Promotional brochure for Brawn of the North

- Irene Rich as Marion Wells
- Lee Shumway as Peter Coe
- Joseph Barrell as Howard Burton
- Roger James Manning as Lester Wells
- Philip Hubbard as The Missionary
- Jean Metcalfe as The Missionary's Wife
- Baby Evangeline Bryant as The Baby
- Lady Silver as The Vamp, a dog
- Strongheart as Brawn

== Gallery ==
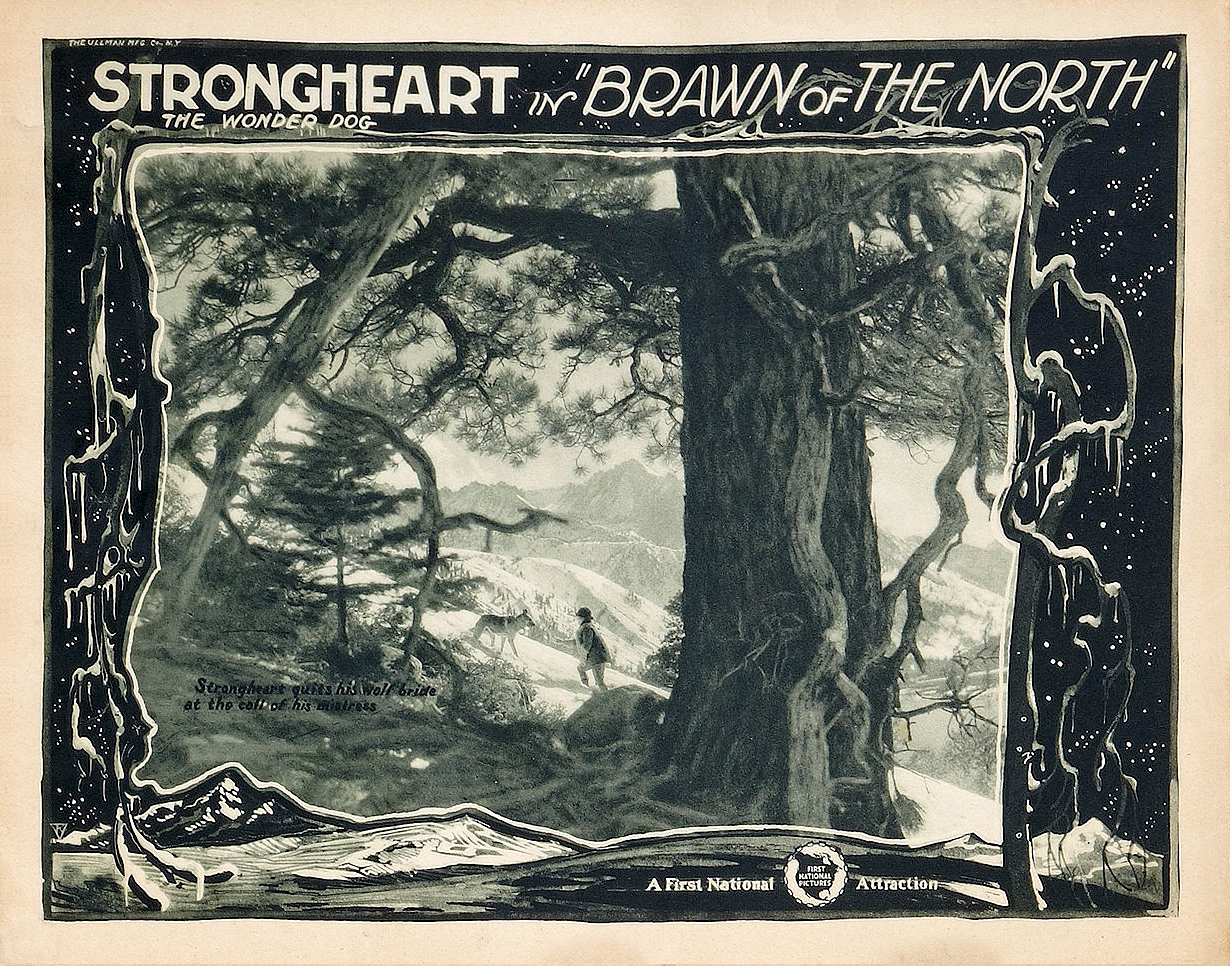
Lobby card
"Strongheart quits his wolf bride at the call of his mistress"

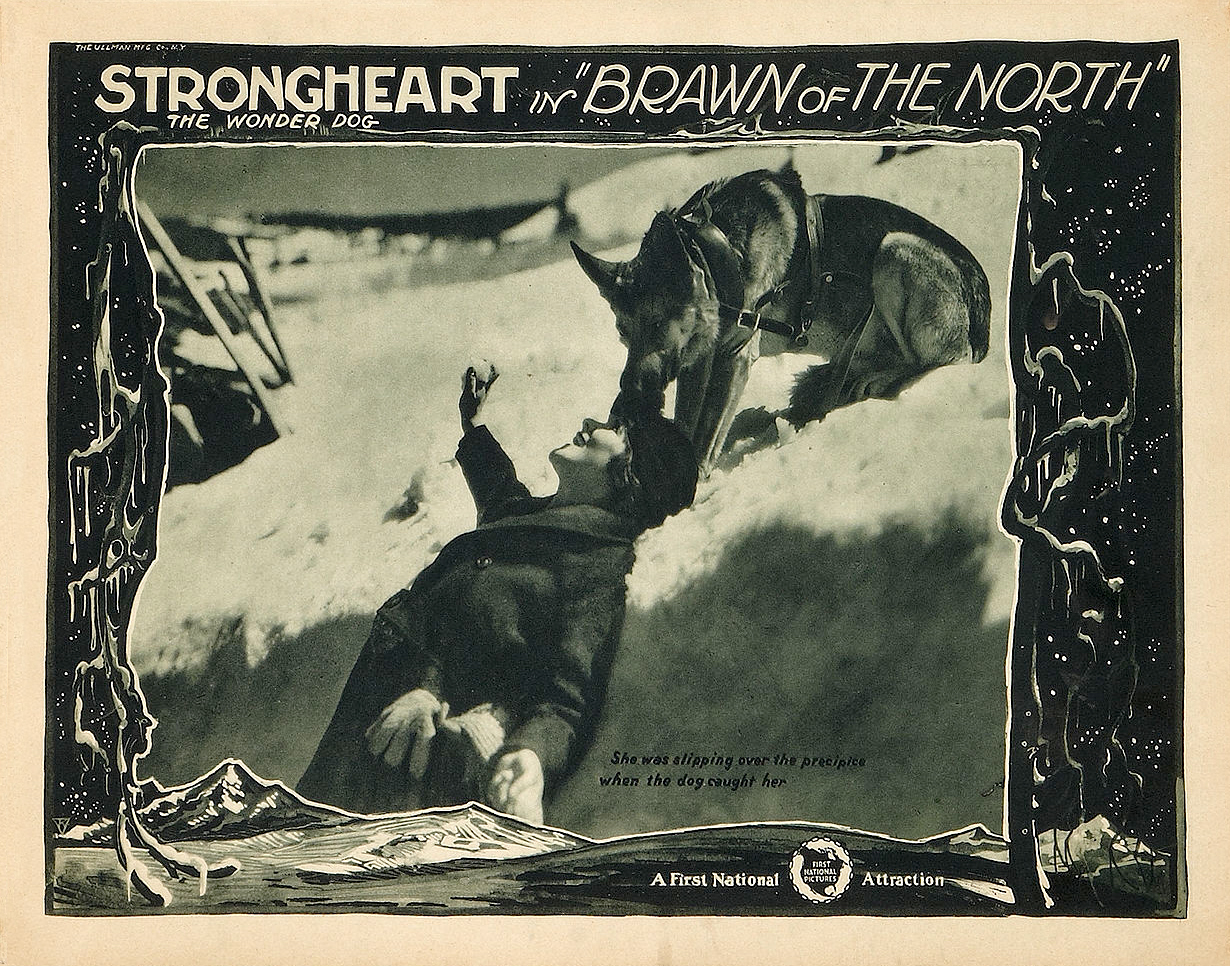
Lobby card
"She was slipping over the precipice when the dog caught her": Irene Rich and Strongheart

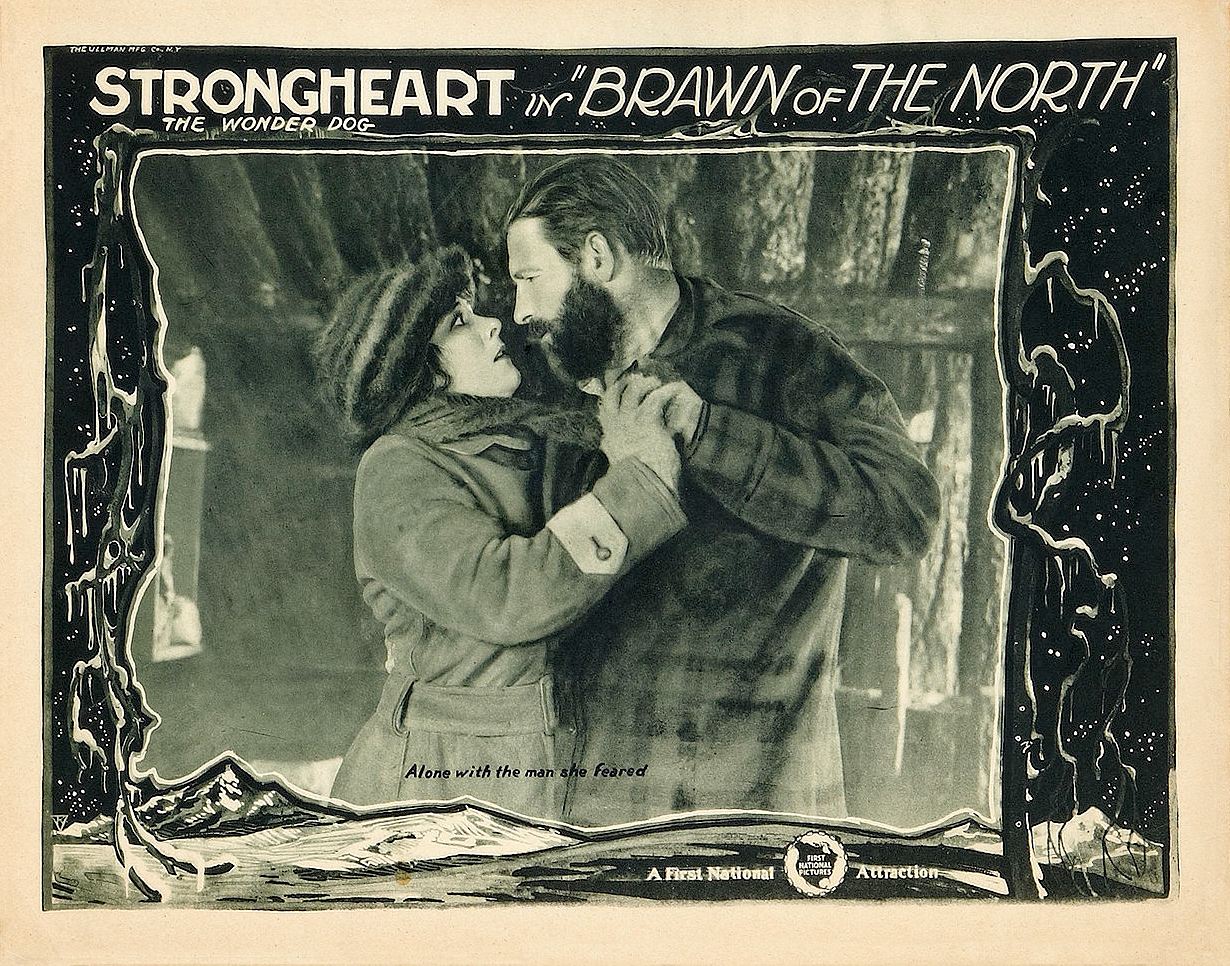
Lobby card
"Alone with the man she feared": Irene Rich and Lee Shumway

== See also ==
- List of lost films
