= The Checkered Flag (1926 film) =

1926 film

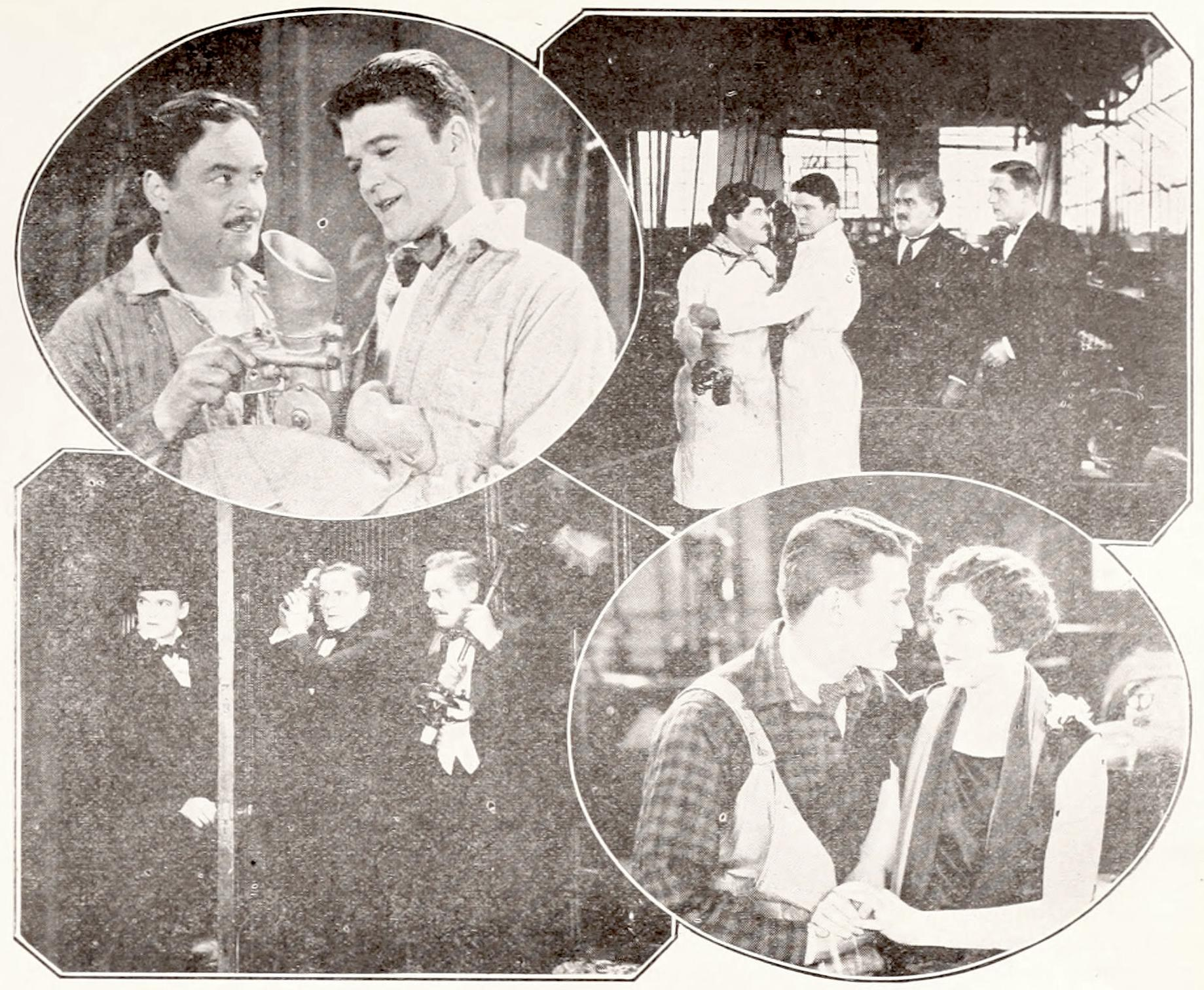
- Publicity photos for the film
- Directed by: John G. Adolfi
- Written by: Fanny Hatton; Frederic Hatton; John Mersereau (novel)
- Starring: Elaine Hammerstein; Wallace MacDonald; Lionel Belmore
- Music by: Michael Hoffman
- Production company: Banner Productions
- Distributed by: Henry Ginsberg Distributing Company
- Release date: January 19, 1926
- Running time: 60 minutes
- Country: United States
- Language: Silent (English intertitles)

The Checkered Flag is a 1926 American silent drama film directed by John G. Adolfi and starring Elaine Hammerstein, Wallace MacDonald, and Lionel Belmore. The title refers to the automobile racing flag used to denote that the race is finished

== Plot ==
As described in a film magazine review, Jack Reese, superintendent at Corbin Motors, is in love with Rita Corbin. His rival is managing director Ray Barton, who succeeds in having Jack fired. Jack and his pal Marcel Dejeans have invented a new carburetor, which they believe will work wonders in making a car win a race. The model carburetor is stolen but recovered by the chums. On the day of the big race, foul play prevents Jack and Marcel from appearing at the racetrack in time to compete. Rita shows her pluck by taking her lovers place and driving the car to victory. Jack becomes friends with Rita's father and wins her affection.

== Cast ==
- Elaine Hammerstein as Rita Corbin
- Wallace MacDonald as Jack Reese
- Lionel Belmore as Joel Corbin
- Robert Ober as Marcel Dejeans
- Peggy O'Neil as Mary McQuire
- Lee Shumway as Ray Barton
- Flora Maynard as Elsie

== Bibliography ==
- Munden, Kenneth White. The American Film Institute Catalog of Motion Pictures Produced in the United States, Part 1. University of California Press, 1997.
