= The Return of Boston Blackie =

1927 film by Harry O. Hoyt

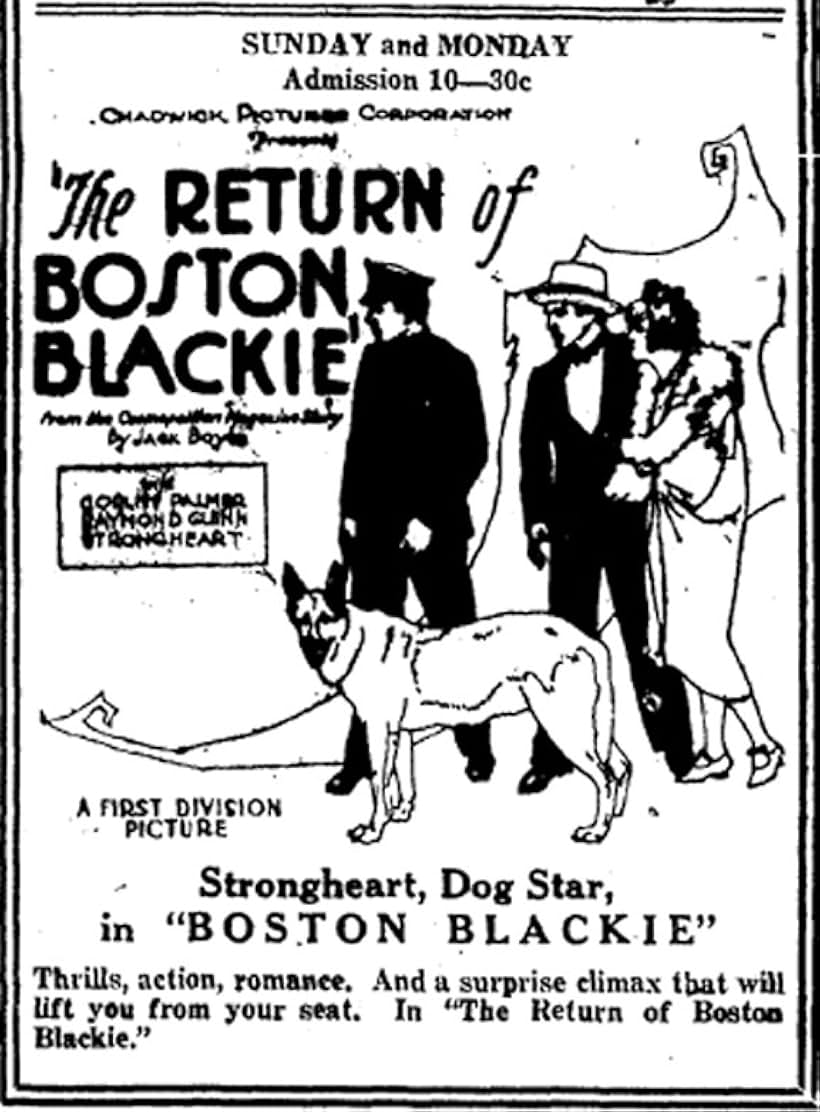
- Ad for the film
- Directed by: Harry O. Hoyt
- Written by: Jack Boyle (story); Leah Baird (adaptation, screenplay)
- Starring: Bob Custer; Strongheart
- Production company: Chadwick Pictures
- Distributed by: First Division Pictures
- Release date: August 1, 1927
- Running time: 6 reels (1787.6 meters)
- Country: United States
- Language: Silent (English intertitles)

The Return of Boston Blackie is a 1927 American low-budget, silent, drama film starring Bob Custer. Based upon a character created by Jack Boyle for short stories appearing in The American, Cosmopolitan, and Redbook magazines in the 1900s. It was directed by Harry O. Hoyt and written by Leah Baird.

The film may have been based on a specific story by Boyle, published in Cosmopolitan, but is likely an original story based on the character.

The character also appeared in another silent film in 1918, Boston Blackie's Little Pal, played by Bert Lytell.

== Plot ==
Just out of jail and vowing to go straight, former jewel thief Boston Blackie undertakes the reformation of a pretty blonde who has stolen a necklace from a cabaret dancer. He learns that the jewel belongs to the mother of the blonde, and the blonde's philandering father gave it as a gift to the cabaret girl. Blackie must find a way to return the necklace to the owner's safe without arousing the suspicions of the girl's family.

== Cast ==
- Corliss Palmer
- Bob Custer (as Raymond Glenn)
- Rosemary Cooper
- Coit Albertson
- William Worthington
- Florence Wix
- J.P. Lockney
- Violet Palmer
- Strongheart

== Preservation ==
A complete print of The Return of Boston Blackie is held by the George Eastman Museum in Rochester, New York. The film was released on DVD with a score by David Knudtson by Grapevine Video in 2014.
