= Jane Murfin =

American dramatist

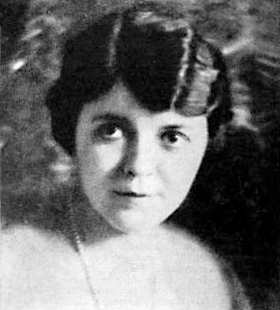
- Jane Murfin in 1923
- Born: Jane Macklem; October 27, 1884; Quincy, Michigan, United States
- Died: August 10, 1955 (aged 70); California, United States
- Occupations: Playwright, screenwriter, producer, director
- Years active: 1919–1944
- Spouses: James Murfin (m. 1907; div. 1912) Donald Crisp (m. 1932; div. 1944)
- Partner: Laurence Trimble (c. 1920–1925)

Jane Murfin, née Macklem (October 27, 1884 – August 10, 1955) was an American playwright, director and screenwriter. The author of several successful plays, she wrote some of them with actress Jane Cowl—most notably Smilin' Through (1919), which was adapted three times for motion pictures. In Hollywood Murfin became a popular screenwriter whose credits include What Price Hollywood? (1932), for which she received an Academy Award nomination. In the 1920s she lived with Laurence Trimble, writing and producing films for their dog Strongheart, the first major canine star.

== Life and career ==
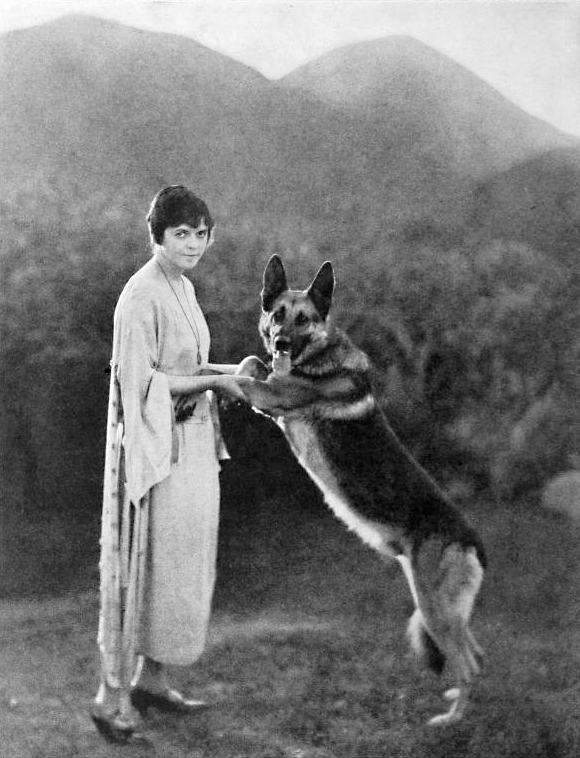
Jane Murfin with Strongheart (1923)

Jane Macklem was born October 27, 1884, in Quincy, Michigan. In 1907 she married attorney James Murfin, and retained his surname when the marriage ended fewer than five years later.

Murfin began her career with the play Lilac Time, which she co-wrote with actress Jane Cowl. The Broadway production opened February 6, 1917, and ran for 176 performances. Later that year the two women began collaborating, often under pseudonym Allan Langdon Martin, on a series of revivals of World War I melodramas. The pair later collaborated on Daybreak, followed by Information Please (1918) and Smilin' Through (1919).

In Hollywood, Murfin became a leading screenwriter, writing many romantic comedies and dramas by herself or in collaboration.

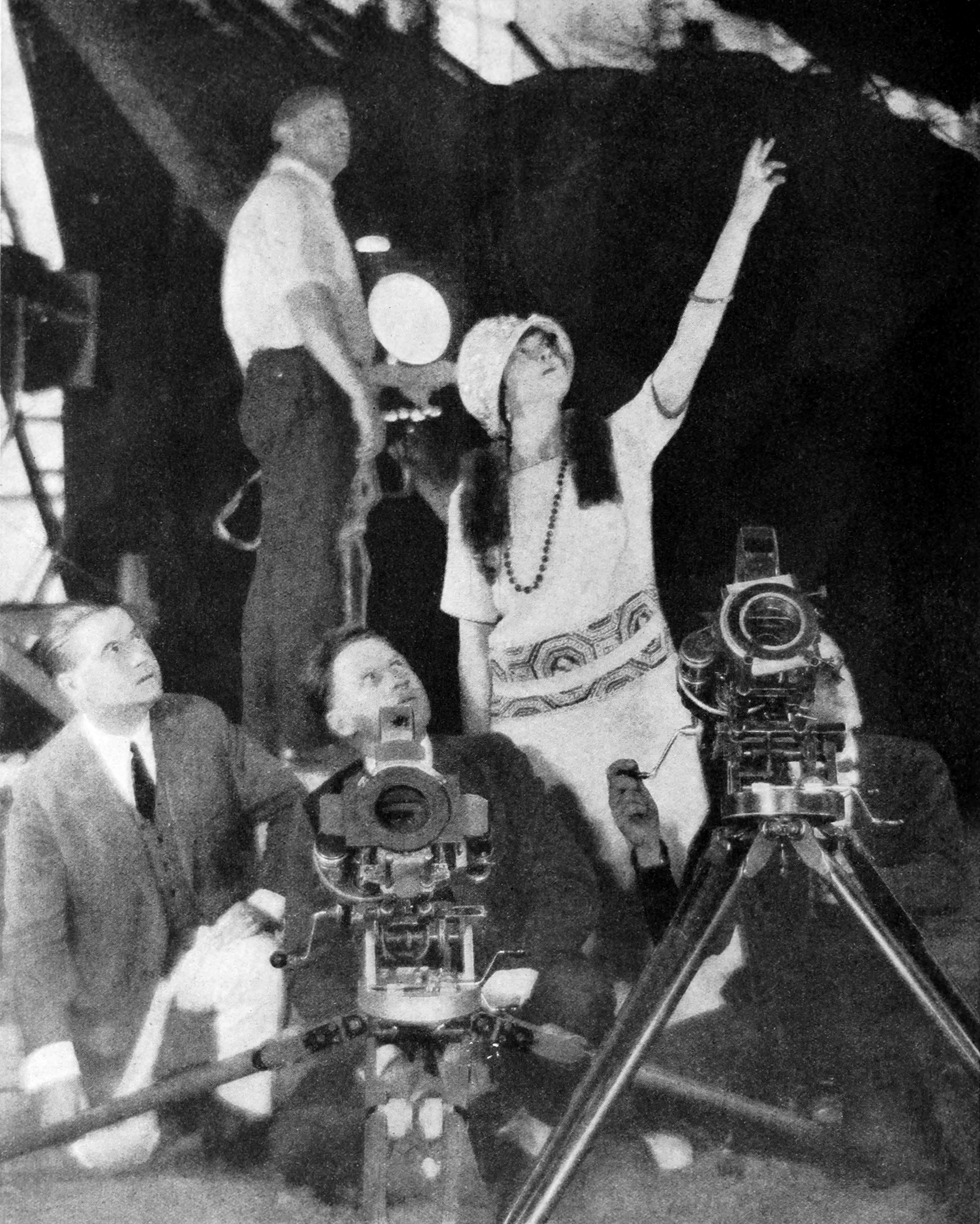
Murfin ordering the placement of lights while directing Flapper Wives (1924)

In 1920, director Laurence Trimble persuaded Murfin to purchase a German Shepherd dog—Strongheart—that became the first major canine film star. Strongheart starred in four films that Trimble directed from Murfin's screenplays: The Silent Call (1921), Brawn of the North (1922), The Love Master (1924) and White Fang (1925).

Murfin is credited with directing one film, Flapper Wives (1924), before the dissolution of her partnership with Trimble. Film historian Kevin Brownlow described this partnership as both professional and personal; although some sources describe Trimble and Murfin as a husband-and-wife filmmaking team, no marriage has been substantiated.

Murfin's later screenwriting credits include Way Back Home (1931), Our Betters (1933), The Little Minister (1934), Spitfire (1934), Roberta (1935), Alice Adams (1935), The Women (1939), Pride and Prejudice (1940), and Dragon Seed (1944).

== Personal life ==
Murfin was married first to lawyer James Murfin from 1907 to 1912. Her second marriage was to actor Donald Crisp, for whom she would write parts in her scripts; the marriage lasted from 1932 to 1944.

== Accolades ==
Murfin and Adela Rogers St. Johns were nominated for the Academy Award for Best Story for What Price Hollywood? (1932). Frances Marion received the award for The Champ.

== Theatre credits ==
Date	Title	Notes
February 6 – July 1917	Lilac Time	Theatre Republic, New York City; written with Jane Cowl; Basis for the 1928 film
August 14 – October 1917	Daybreak	Harris Theatre, New York City; written with Jane Cowl; Basis for the 1918 film
October 2 – November 1918	Information Please	Selwyn Theatre, New York City; Basis for the film A Temperamental Wife (1919)
December 30, 1919 – May 1920	Smilin' Through	Broadhurst Theatre, New York City; written with Jane Cowl, as Allan Langdon Martin; Basis for film adaptations in 1922, 1932 and 1941
October 21 – November 1929	Stripped	Ambassador Theatre, New York City

== Select filmography ==
Murfin is credited as a writer; additional production credits are noted.

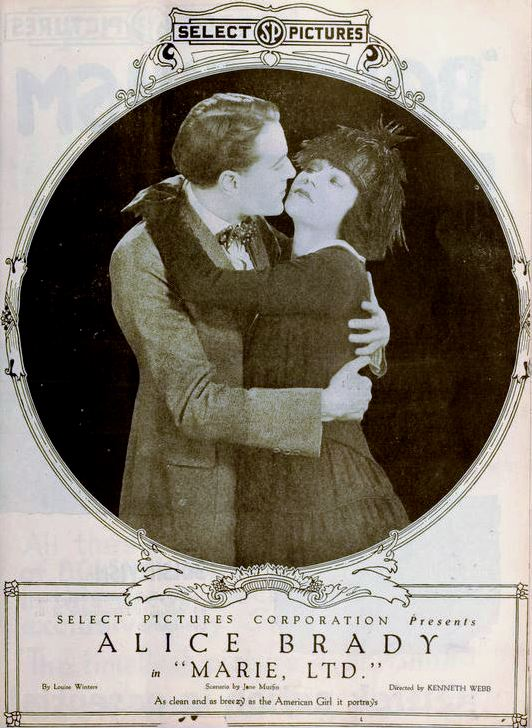
Ad for Marie, Ltd. (1919)

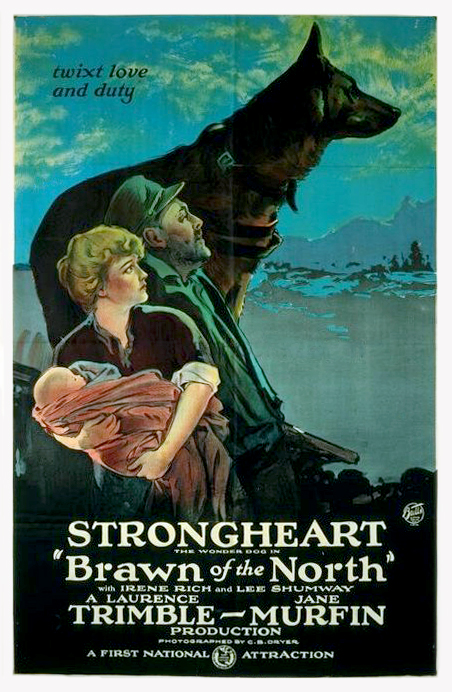
Poster for Brawn of the North (1922)

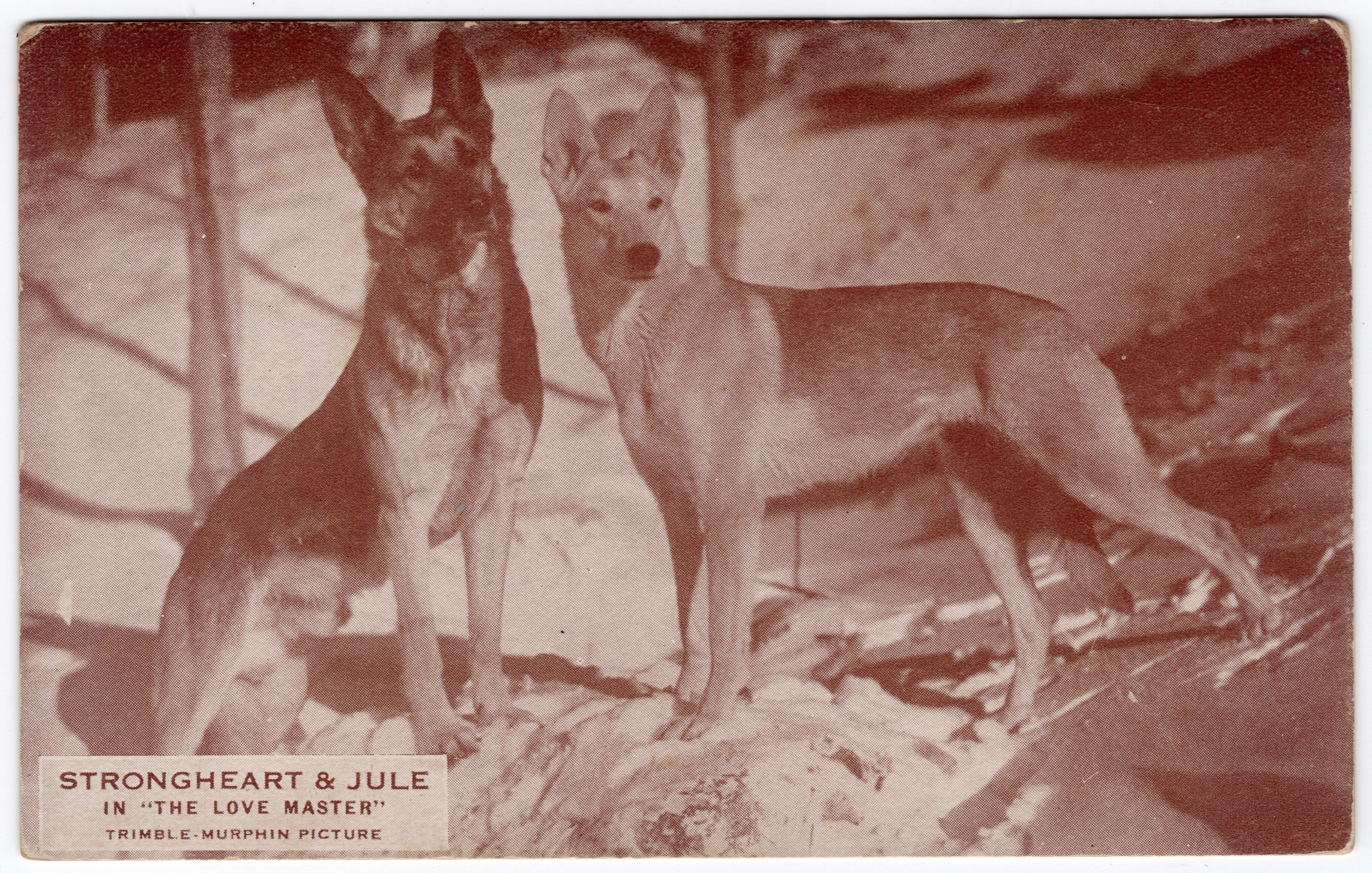
Postcard for The Love Master (1924)

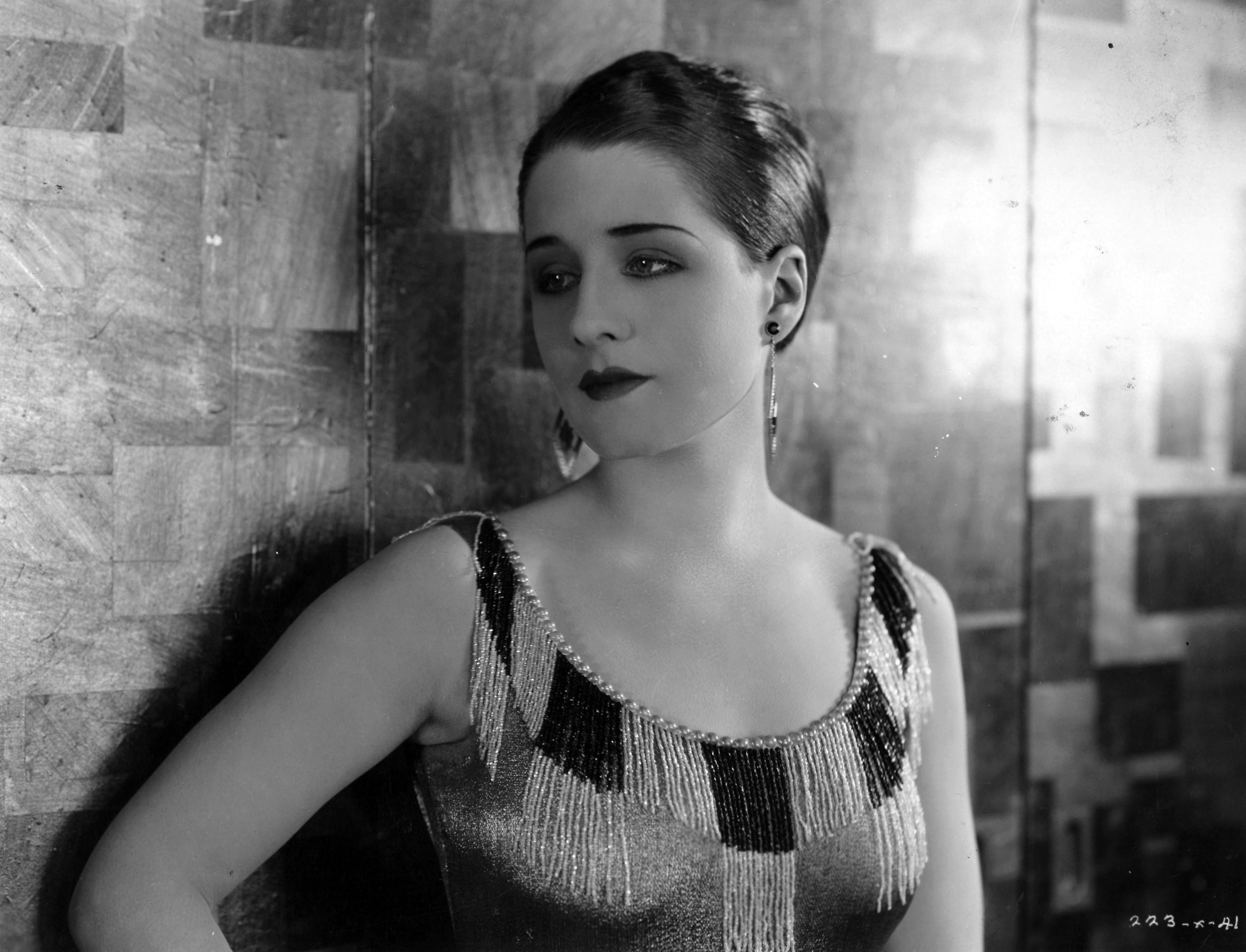
Norma Shearer in A Slave of Fashion (1925)

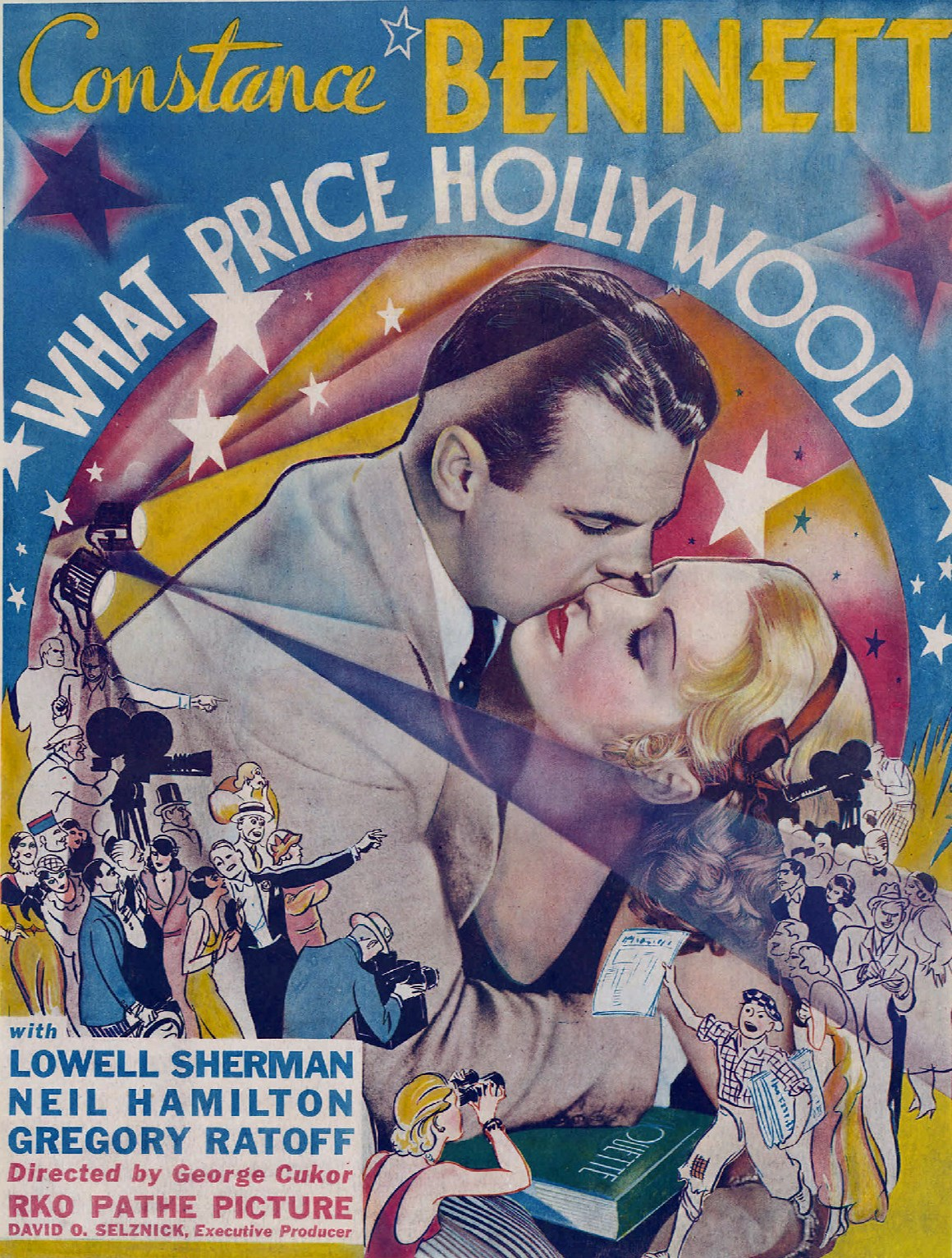
Window card for What Price Hollywood? (1932)

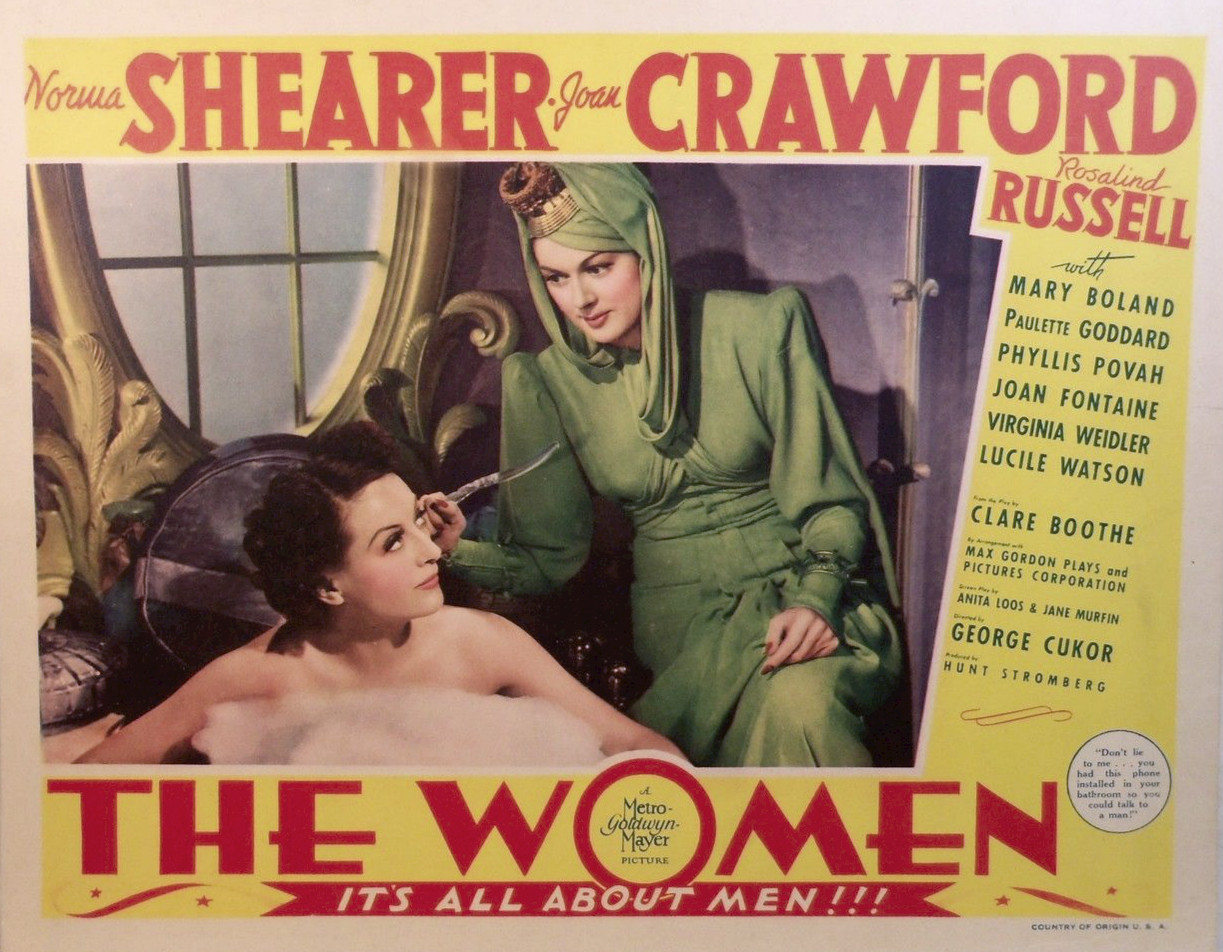
Lobby card for The Women (1939)

Year	Title	Notes
1919	Marie, Ltd.	
1919	The Right to Lie	
1920	The Amateur Wife	
1921	The Silent Call	
1922	Brawn of the North	Also producer
1924	The Love Master	Also producer
1924	Flapper Wives	Also producer, director
1925	White Fang	
1925	A Slave of Fashion	
1926	The Savage	
1926	Meet the Prince	
1927	The Notorious Lady	
1927	The Prince of Headwaiters	
1929	Street Girl	
1929	Half Marriage	
1929	Dance Hall	
1929	Seven Keys to Baldpate	
1930	The Runaway Bride	
1930	Lawful Larceny	
1930	Leathernecking	
1930	The Pay-Off	
1931	Too Many Cooks	
1931	Friends and Lovers	
1931	Way Back Home	
1932	Young Bride	
1932	What Price Hollywood?	
1932	Rockabye	
1933	Our Betters	
1933	The Silver Cord	
1933	Double Harness	
1933	Ann Vickers	
1933	After Tonight	
1933	Little Women	
1934	Spitfire	
1934	This Man Is Mine	
1934	The Crime Doctor	
1934	The Life of Vergie Winters	
1934	The Fountain	
1934	The Little Minister	
1935	Romance in Manhattan	
1935	Roberta	
1935	Break of Hearts	
1935	Alice Adams	
1936	Come and Get It	
1937	That Girl from Paris	
1937	I'll Take Romance	
1938	The Shining Hour	
1939	Stand Up and Fight	
1939	The Women	
1940	Northwest Passage	
1940	Pride and Prejudice	
1941	Andy Hardy's Private Secretary	
1943	Flight for Freedom	
1944	Cry "Havoc"	
1944	Dragon Seed	
