= Whispering Canyon =

1926 film

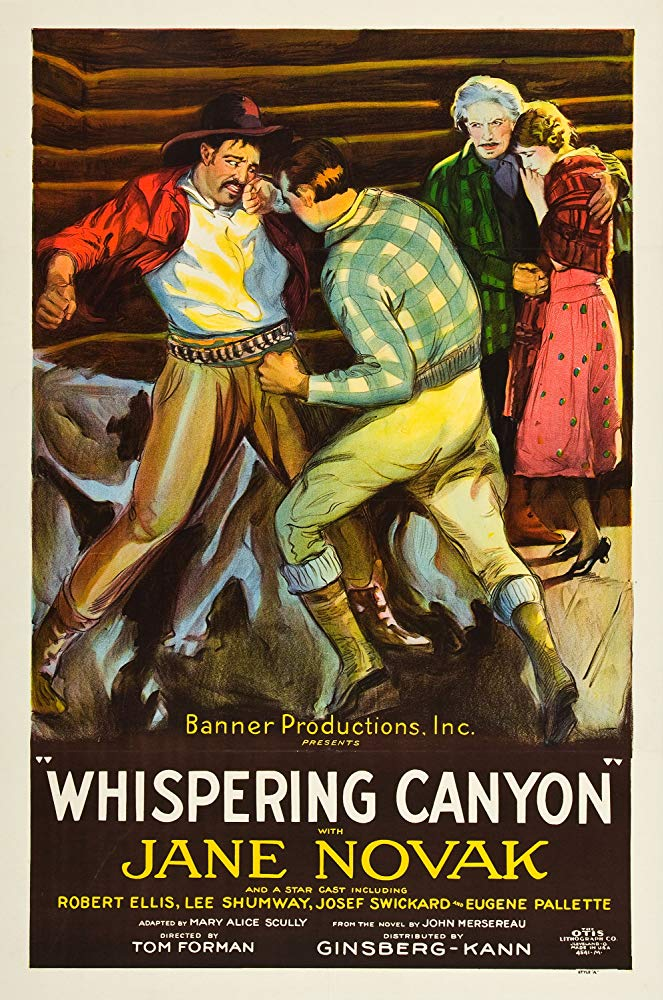
- Directed by: Tom Forman
- Written by: John Mersereau (novel); Mary Alice Scully
- Starring: Jane Novak; Robert Ellis; Lee Shumway
- Cinematography: Harry Davis; William H. Tuers
- Production company: Banner Productions
- Distributed by: Henry Ginsberg Distributing Company; Wardour Films (UK)
- Release date: May 10, 1926
- Country: United States
- Languages: Silent; English intertitles

Whispering Canyon is a 1926 American silent drama film directed by Tom Forman and starring Jane Novak, Robert Ellis and Lee Shumway.

== Cast ==
- Jane Novak as Antonia Lee
- Robert Ellis as Bob Cameron
- Lee Shumway as Lew Selby
- Josef Swickard as Eben Beauregard
- Eugene Pallette as Harvey Hawes
- Jim Mason as Medbrook
- Ed Brady as Gonzales

== Bibliography ==
- Goble, Alan. The Complete Index to Literary Sources in Film. Walter de Gruyter, 1999.
