= J. Allen Boone =

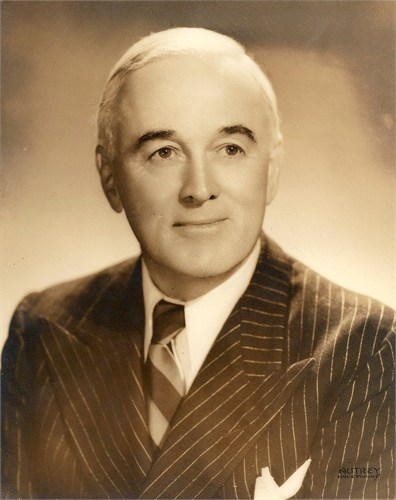
J. Allen Boone in 1945

J. Allen Boone (17 February 1882 – 17 June 1965) was an American author of several books about nonverbal communication with animals in the 1940s and 1950s. He wrote much on his friendship with Strongheart, a film star-German Shepherd, who he credits with teaching him how to achieve deeper bonds through extrasensory perception, a "silent language" that can be learned.

Boone was an early film producer and correspondent for the Washington Post. His friendships in Hollywood led to his care-taking of Strongheart.

== Works ==
- Letters to Strongheart (Prentice Hall, 1939; Robert H Sommer, 1977, ISBN 0-933062-19-2; Tree of Life Publications, 1999, ISBN 0-930852-34-6)
- You are the adventure! (Prentice-Hall, 1943; Robert H Sommer, 1977, ISBN 0-933062-20-6)
- Kinship with All Life (Harper and Row, 1954; HarperCollins, 1976, ISBN 0-06-060912-5)
- Language of Silence: Heartwarming True Experiences That Reveal a Wonderful World of Communication Between Human Beings and Animals edited by Paul and Blanche Leonard, (Harpercollins, 1970, ISBN 0-06-060911-7; Harper & Row, 1976, ISBN 0-06-060913-3), republished, with editing by Bianca Leonardo, as Adventures in Kinship with All Life (Tree of Life Publications, 1990, ISBN 0-930852-08-7; 3rd edition, 1990, ISBN 0-930852-27-3)
