= Jonathan Dayton =

American Founding Father and politician (1760–1824)

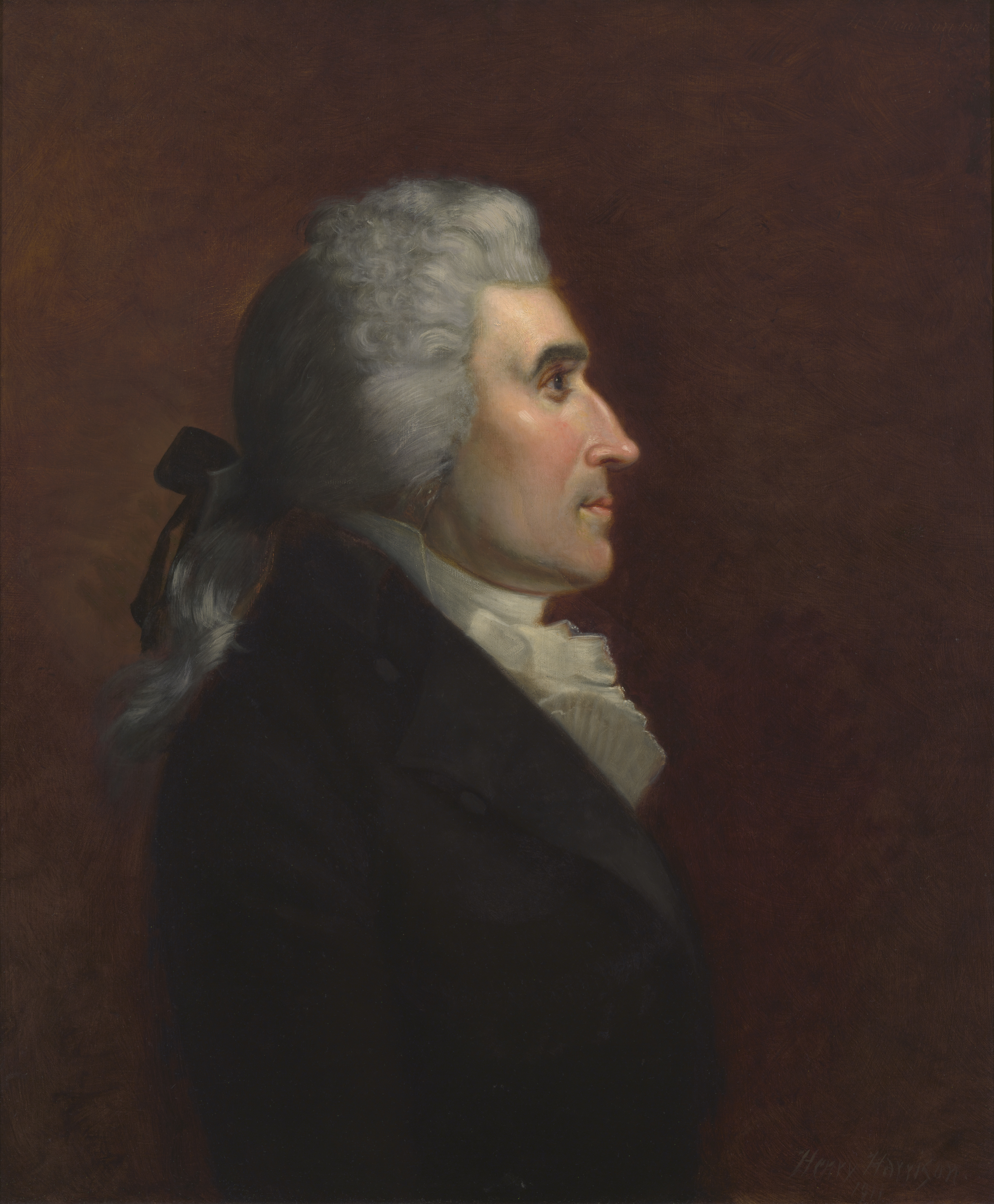
- Posthumous portrait, c. 1911

3rd Speaker of the United States House of Representatives
- In office December 7, 1795 – March 3, 1799
- Preceded by: Frederick Muhlenberg
- Succeeded by: Theodore Sedgwick

United States Senator from New Jersey
- In office March 4, 1799 – March 3, 1805
- Preceded by: Richard Stockton
- Succeeded by: Aaron Kitchell

Member of the U.S. House of Representatives from New Jersey's at-large district
- In office March 4, 1791 – March 3, 1799
- Preceded by: James Schureman; Elias Boudinot
- Succeeded by: Mark Thomson; John Condit

Member of the New Jersey Legislative Council
- In office 1787–1788

Delegate from New Jersey to the Congress of the Confederation
- In office 1787–1788

Speaker of the New Jersey General Assembly
- In office 1790

Member of the New Jersey General Assembly
- In office 1786–1787
- In office 1790

Personal details
- Born: October 16, 1760 Elizabethtown, Province of New Jersey, British America
- Died: October 9, 1824 (aged 63) Elizabethtown, New Jersey, U.S.
- Party: Federalist
- Other political affiliations: Pro-Administration
- Spouse: Susan Williamson
- Parent: Elias Dayton (father)
- Relatives: George Dayton (great-grandson)
- Education: College of New Jersey
- Profession: Lawyer

Jonathan Dayton (October 16, 1760 – October 9, 1824) was an American Founding Father and politician from New Jersey. At 26, he was the youngest person to sign the Constitution of the United States. He was elected to the United States House of Representatives in 1791 and later served from 1795 to 1799 as its third Speaker. He left the House in 1799 after being elected to the U.S. Senate, where he served one term. Dayton was arrested in 1807 for alleged treason in connection with Aaron Burr's conspiracy to establish an independent country in the Southwestern United States and parts of Mexico. He was exonerated by a grand jury, but his national political career never recovered.

== Early life, family and education ==
Jonathan Dayton was born in Elizabeth, New Jersey (known then as Elizabethtown). He was the son of Elias Dayton and his wife, the former Hannah Rolfe. Elias Dayton was a merchant prominent in local politics who had served as a militia officer in the French and Indian War, Jonathan graduated from the local academy, run by Tapping Reeve and Francis Barber, where he was classmates with Alexander Hamilton. He then attended the College of New Jersey (now known as Princeton University). He left college in 1775 to fight in the American Revolutionary War and received an honorary degree in 1776.

== Career ==
=== Military ===
Dayton was 15 at the outbreak of the war in 1775 and served under his father in the 3rd New Jersey Regiment as an ensign. On January 1, 1777, he was commissioned a lieutenant and served as paymaster. He saw service under General George Washington, fighting in the battles of Brandywine Creek and Germantown. He remained with Washington at Valley Forge and helped push the British from their position in New Jersey into the safety of New York City. In October 1780, Dayton and an uncle were captured by Loyalists, who held them captive for the winter before releasing them in the following year. Dayton again served under his father in the New Jersey Brigade. On March 30, 1780, at age 19, he was promoted to the rank of captain and transferred to the 2nd New Jersey Regiment, where he took part in the Battle of Yorktown. The Revolutionary War pension records indicate that he served as aide-de-camp to General John Sullivan on his expedition against the Indians from May 1 to November 30, 1779.

At the close of the Revolutionary War, Dayton was admitted as an original member of The Society of the Cincinnati in the state of New Jersey. On July 19, 1799, Dayton was offered a commission as major general in the Provisional United States Army, but he declined.

=== Law and politics ===
After the war, Dayton studied law and opened a practice, dividing his time between land speculation, law, and politics. After serving as a New Jersey delegate to the Continental Congress and Constitutional Convention (of which he was the youngest member, at age 26), he became a prominent Federalist legislator. He was a member of the New Jersey General Assembly in 1786–1787, and again in 1790, and served in the New Jersey Legislative Council (now the New Jersey Senate) in 1789.

Dayton was elected to the U.S. House of Representatives in 1789, but he did not take his seat until he was re-elected in 1791. He served as speaker for the Fourth and Fifth Congresses. Like most Federalists, he supported the fiscal policies of Alexander Hamilton, and he helped organize the suppression of the Whiskey Rebellion. In 1799 he was elected to the senate and served a single term. He supported the Louisiana Purchase and opposed the repeal of the Judiciary Act of 1801.

Wealthy from his heavy investments in Ohio, Dayton lent money to Aaron Burr, becoming involved by association in the alleged conspiracy in which Burr was accused of intending to conquer parts of what is now the Southwestern United States. Dayton was exonerated, but his association with Burr effectively ended his political career.

== Personal life ==
Dayton married Susan Williamson in 1779 and had two daughters.

Dayton died on October 9, 1824 in his hometown. He was interred in an unmarked grave that is now under the St. John's Episcopal Church in Elizabeth, New Jersey, which replaced an original church in 1860. Shortly before Dayton's death, Marquis de Lafayette visited him."Obituary: Jonathan Dayton". Columbian Centinel. October 20, 1824. "In New-Jersey, Hon. JONATHAN DAYTON, formerly Speaker of the House of Representatives of Congress, and a Hero of the Revolution. When the Nation's Guest lately passed New-Jersey, he passed the night with General Dayton, and such were the exertions of this aged and distinguished federalist, to honor the Guest, and gratify the wishes of his fellow citizens to see, that he sunk under them; and expired, without regret, a few days after."

== Commemoration and legacy ==
The city of Dayton, Ohio, was named after him. While he never visited the area, he was a signatory to the Constitution and, at the time the city of Dayton was established in 1796, he owned (in partnership with Arthur St. Clair, James Wilkinson and Israel Ludlow) 250,000 acres (1,011 km^{2}) in the Great Miami River basin. The Jonathan Dayton High School in Springfield Township, Union County, New Jersey, the Dayton neighborhood of Newark, New Jersey, Dayton Street in Madison, Wisconsin, and Dayton, New Jersey, are named in his honor.

U.S. House of Representatives
Preceded by Elias Boudinot	Member of the U.S. House of Representatives from New Jersey's at-large congressional district March 4, 1791 – March 3, 1799	Succeeded by William Helms
U.S. Senate
Preceded by Richard Stockton	U.S. senator (Class 2) from New Jersey; March 4, 1799 – March 3, 1805	Succeeded by Aaron Kitchell
