= 3rd New Jersey Regiment =

- Active: 1776–1781
- Allegiance: Continental Congress of the United States
- Type: Infantry
- Part of: New Jersey Line
- Nickname: "Jersey Grays"
- Engagements: Battle of Valcour Island, New York Campaign, Battle of Brandywine, Battle of Germantown, Battle of Monmouth, the Sullivan Expedition, Battle of Springfield.

Commanders
- Notable commanders: Colonel Elias Dayton

The 3rd New Jersey Regiment was ordered to be formed on January 1, 1776, and establishment was formalized on January 10, 1776 at Elizabethtown, New Jersey for service with the Continental Army. Officers of the regiment were previously selected including Col. Elias Dayton, Anthony Walton White, Francis Barber, Capts. Joseph Bloomfield, Peter Dickinson, Samuel Potter, Thomas Patterson, John Ross, Thomas Reading, William Eugene Emlay, Anthony Sharp along with Surgeons, Ensigns, Lieutenants, and full companies of men who enlisted between February 19-27, 1776. The regiment first were given orders to fortify New Jersey for possible defense throughout the spring of 1776. They were also issued uniforms in greater numbers than most regiments at the time. Though the wool stores within New Jersey have been depleted, "drab" wool colored coats with blue facings were issued to the men, with white bound hats, new shirts, white cartridge box belts and bayonet belts, new invented knapsacks, and deerskin breeches. Thus, the regiment is later referenced as the "Jersey Grays" due to their drab coats, before being known as the "Jersey Blues" with Blue coats later issued in 1777.

On May 2, 1776 the regiment paraded through New York City under review of George Washington. The general remarks that the regiment is the "Flower of all North American Forces" as 60-75% are in matching uniforms. The regiment is sent into the Mohawk Valley and spends the summer, fall, and winter building fortifications that become significant throughout the war, such as Forts Dayton and Stanwix, and Fort Ticonderoga.

The first establishment of the 3rd New Jersey is dismissed on Morristown Green on March 22nd, 1777. Those that reenlist, reenlist in the second establishment-the "Jersey Blues" as they are issued blue coats. The regiment saw action at the Battle of Brandywine, Battle of Germantown, Battle of Monmouth, the Forage Wars, Sullivan Expedition and the Battle of Springfield. The regiment was disbanded on January 1, 1781, at Pompton, New Jersey.

One of the captains of this regiment was Jonathan Dayton, the youngest signatory of the United States Constitution.
