= John Mersereau =

American novelist

John Mersereau (1898–1989) was an American novelist. Several of his stories were made into films. His novels include The Corpse Comes Ashore, Murder Loves Company, and Whispering Canyon. Whispering Canyon was adapted into the 1926 film Whispering Canyon. He also wrote the novel that the movie The Checkered Flag was based on.

Kirkus Reviews described Murder Loves Company as a murder mystery set at the 1939 Golden Gate International Exposition in San Francisco and rated the work an "averagely good yarn".

John Mersereau Jr. (1925 - 2009) wrote Overdue at Immokalee: A Tale of Preemptive Assassination and several books on Russian literature, poetry, and language.

== Bibliography ==
- The Corpse Comes Ashore
- Garber of Thunder Gorge by John Mersereau and Whitman Chambers Small, Maynard, 1924
- The Checkered Flag, 1925
- The Whispering Canyon by John Mersereau, Grosset & Dunlap, 1926
- Gill O' the Rangers: A Western Story by John Mersereau, Chelsea House Publishers, 1930
- Murder Loves Company
