= Glen Gano =

American actor and cinematographer

- Born: December 11, 1892; Kokomo, Indiana, U.S.
- Died: May 7, 1973 (aged 80); Los Angeles, California, U.S.
- Other name: Glenn Gano
- Education: Egan School
- Occupations: Actor, cinematographer
- Years active: 1913–1971

Glen Gano (December 11, 1892 – May 7, 1973) was an American cinematographer and actor.

== Early life and career ==
Born in Kokomo, Indiana, Gano later attended the Egan Dramatic School in Los Angeles, where, as reported by The Times in July 1912, he and a young Eugene Pallette—then billed as E. W.—were amongst the "advanced pupils" appearing in the "Christmas-tree act" from Clyde Fitch's The Climbers.

Launched 2 years later, Gano's screen acting career comprised a half-dozen appearances prior to America's entry into World War I, during which he served in the United States Army Corps of Engineers.

By contrast, Gano's behind-the-camera credits span roughly half a century, beginning with the 1921 canine-centered adventure film The Silent Call and concluding with American International's The Incredible 2-Headed Transplant. In the interim, Gano shot such works such as Three Stooges shorts Booby Dupes, Micro-Phonies, Idiots Deluxe, and The Yoke's On Me, the Charles Starrett western Frontier Gun Law, and Budd Boetticher's A Guy, a Gal and a Pal, starring future producer Russ Meyer.

As a cinematographer, Gano became something of a celebrity, at least among industry insiders, both as a speaker and as the author of numerous articles on the subject, published in The Amateur Cinematographer and The Film Mercury. He was also an innovator, having employed his own, home-made panchromatic stock on his 1921 DP debut.

On December 6, 1915, during the filming of an episode of the serial The Hazards of Helen, Gana, reportedly acting as a stunt double for the film's star, Helen Holmes, suffered what, over the next few days, would be described variously as "a fatal fall," "tragic death," "injuries from which he will probably die," (aka "probably fatal injuries"), making an ill-fated leap from the 4th Street Bridge in Los Angeles. Thankfully, reports of his demise proved premature.

== Death ==
Gano died on May 7, 1973, in Los Angeles, California, at the age of 80.

== Selected filmography ==
- The Silent Call (1921)
- White Fang (1925)
- Flashing Fangs (1926)
- Romance of the West (1930)
- Hot Biskits (1931), Spencer Williams directorial debut
- Gold Fever (1952)
