= Strongheart =

One of the earliest dog stars

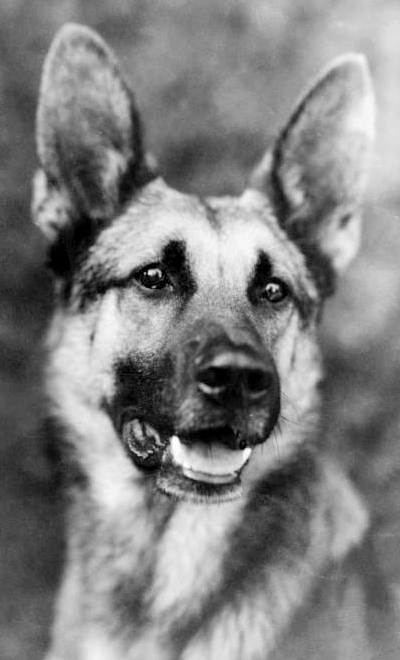
- Strongheart in 1921
- Species: Canis lupus familiaris
- Breed: German Shepherd Dog
- Sex: Male
- Born: Etzel von Oeringen; October 1, 1917; Breslau, Germany
- Died: June 24, 1929 (aged 11); Los Angeles, California, U.S.
- Occupation: Actor
- Years active: 1921–1927
- Owner: Jane Murfin

Etzel von Oeringen (October 1, 1917 – June 24, 1929), better known as Strongheart, was a male German Shepherd that was one of the early canine stars of feature films.

== Biography ==
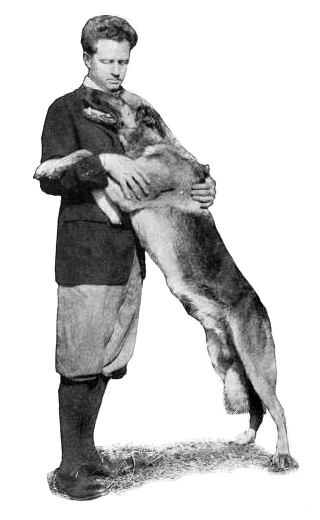
Laurence Trimble and Strongheart (1921)

Born October 1, 1917, Etzel von Oeringen was a male German Shepherd dog bred by a private breeder, Robert Niedhardt of Quedlinburg, Germany. Etzel was trained in Berlin as a police dog and served in the German Red Cross during World War I. His owner was left in poverty after the war, and was unable to even support the dog. Concerned that Etzel would end up in less humane hands, he declined larger offers and instead sent the dog to a friend who operated a reputable kennel in White Plains, New York. At age three, Etzel was brought to the United States to be sold.

At the sixth annual show of the Shepherd Dog Club of America, October 15–16, 1920, Etzel placed third in his class. He was described as "immense in body and hind leg formation, in body and legs a trifle better than either of the dogs above him".

Etzel was seen by film director Laurence Trimble, who had owned and guided Jean the Vitagraph Dog, the first canine movie star in the United States. Trimble recognized Etzel's potential and persuaded Jane Murfin, a screenwriter for his films, to buy the dog. A new name, Strongheart, was suggested by the publicity department of First National Pictures, which released his first film.

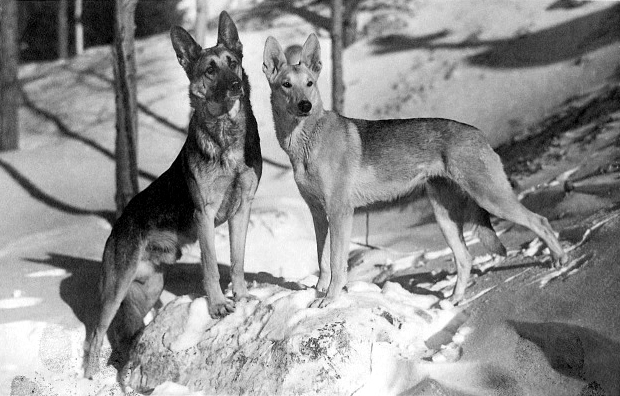
Strongheart and Lady Jule (1924)

Trimble trained Strongheart and directed him in four rugged outdoor adventure films scripted by Murfin: The Silent Call (1921), Brawn of the North (1922), The Love Master (1924), and White Fang (1925). Strongheart became the first major canine film star, preceding the fame of Rin Tin Tin, also a male German Shepherd, by two years.

In 1929 Strongheart accidentally made contact with a hot studio light and was burned. He died June 24 at Murfin's home.

== Filmography ==
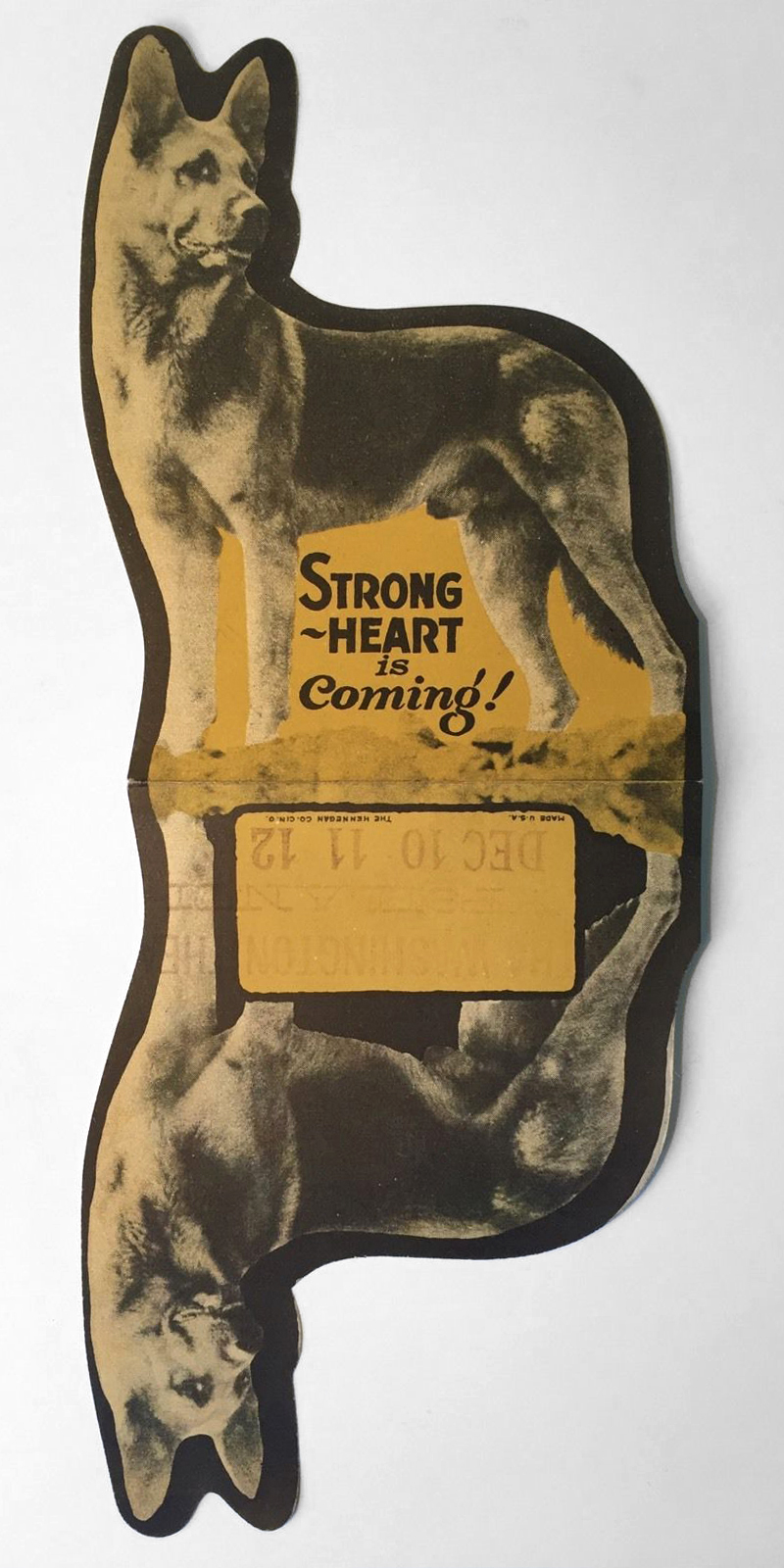
Die-cut herald for Brawn of the North (1922), a lost film

Virtually all of Strongheart's films have been lost. A print of The Love Master (1924) survives in France, having been transferred in 2006 from the National Center of Cinematography and the Moving Image to Cinematheque (https://www.cinematheque.fr/). The Return of Boston Blackie (1927) survives from a 16mm print and is available on region-free DVD.

Year	Title	Director	Notes
1921	The Silent Call	Laurence Trimble	
1922	Brawn of the North	Laurence Trimble	
1924	The Love Master	Laurence Trimble	
1925	White Fang	Laurence Trimble	
1925	North Star	Paul Powell	
1927	The Return of Boston Blackie	Harry O. Hoyt	

== Accolades ==
Strongheart was inducted into the Hollywood Walk of Fame on February 8, 1960. His star is located at 1724 Vine Street.

== In literature and commerce ==
Strongheart's popularity inspired Doyle Packing Company to adopt his name and photograph for a canned dog food in 1932. Strongheart Dog Food did a respectable business, especially in the Midwest, and ninety years later (as of 2025) was still being made.

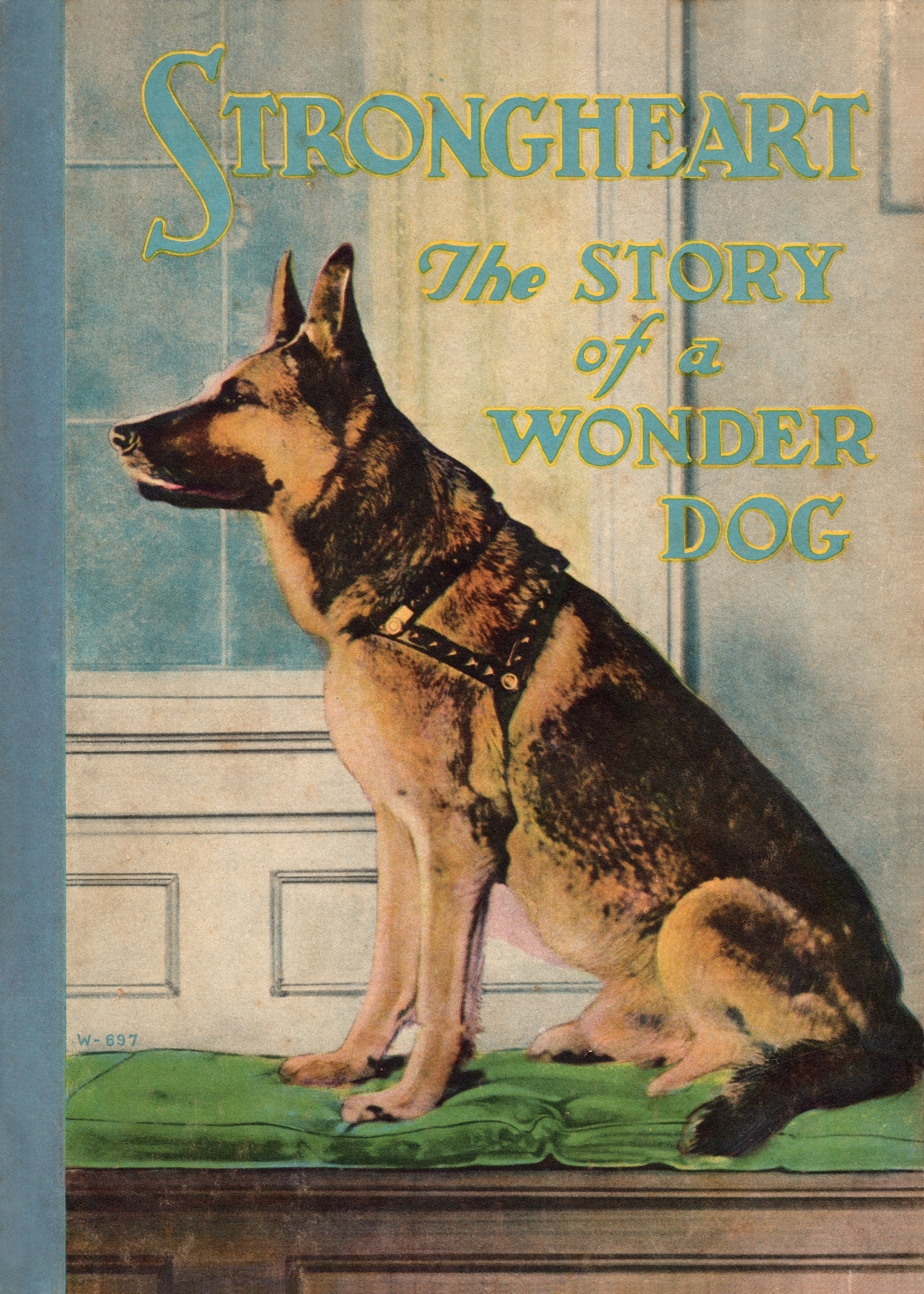
Strongheart; The Story of a Wonder Dog (1926)

In the 1926 picture book Strongheart; The Story of a Wonder Dog, Trimble wrote the story of how Strongheart came to the United States and was chosen for motion pictures, of his training, and of his progress in films culminating with White Fang.

J. Allen Boone wrote two books, Letters to Strongheart (1939) and Kinship with All Life (1954), about animal communication and the survival of the dog's soul after death. Both books were reprinted many times and remain classics of the Spiritualist faith. Boone was a Washington Post correspondent who looked after Strongheart for an extended period while Murfin and Trimble were away on business. Boone and Strongheart reportedly formed a deep bond, and Boone believed the dog was a transformational being.

Strongheart: The World’s First Movie Star Dog (2014) is a picture book for young audiences by Caldecott Medal winner Emily Arnold McCully. The New York Times praised her "meticulous job of recreating the quicksilver world of that bygone media age. The megaphones, bobbed hair and jodhpurs are all here. And in Etzel, a dog born and bred to be strong and brave, she has given young readers a rare portrait of a Hollywood hero who was just as heroic off-screen as on."

Strongheart: Wonder Dog of the Silver Screen (2018) is a novel for ages 8–12 by Candace Fleming and illustrated by Caldecott Medal winner Eric Rohmann. Kirkus Reviews said, "Like a silent movie plot, Fleming’s narrative is full of adventure, romance, and suspense." The book received a starred review in Booklist.

== Bibliography ==
- Lawrence Trimble Strongheart The Story Of A Wonder Dog Racine, Wisconsin; Whitman Publishing Company, 1926

== See also ==
- List of individual dogs
