= 1861 in music =

== Events ==
- February 18 – To celebrate the opening of the parliament of the new Italian nation at Turin, Giuseppe Verdi's opera La Favorita is performed in the Teatro Regio. Verdi himself is a deputy in the new parliament.
- March 13–24 – The only three performances of the Paris version of Wagner's opera Tannhäuser attract increasing disturbances.
- November – Nikolai Rimsky-Korsakov is introduced by his teacher Feodor A. Kanille to Mily Balakirev. This completes The Five (The Mighty Handful) of composers. He begins his Symphony No. 1 in E flat under Balakirev's guidance.
- November 15 – Teaching begins at the London Academy of Music and Dramatic Art, founded by conductor Henry Wylde, the oldest specialist performing arts school in the British Isles.
- Tchaikovsky starts to attend Russian Musical Society classes in music theory taught by Nikolai Zaremba at the Mikhailovsky Palace.

== Published popular music ==
- "Go Down, Moses", traditional African American spiritual, heard as a rallying anthem for the Contrabands at Fort Monroe; first spiritual known to be recorded in sheet music.
- "Abide With Me", w. Rev Henry Francis Lyte (1847), m. William Henry Monk ("Eventide," 1861)
- "Alice, Where Art Thou?", w. Wellington Guernsey m. Joseph Ascher
- "Aura Lea", w. W. W. Fosdick m. George R. Poulton
- "The Bonnie Blue Flag", w. Mrs Annie Chambers Ketchum m. Harry Macarthy
- "Eternal Father, Strong to Save", w. William Whiting m. Rev. John Bacchus Dykes
- "Holy! Holy! Holy! Lord God Almighty", w. Reginald Heber (1826), m. John Bacchus Dykes ("Nicaea," 1861)
- "I'm Going Home to Dixie", w. Dan Emmett arr. C. S. Grafully
- "John Brown's Body", w. anon m. William Steffe
- "Maryland, My Maryland", w. James Ryder Randall m. Walter de Mapers, m. "Mini est Propositum" (12th century)
- "The Privateer", w.m. anon ("Quien Sabé")
- "The Vacant Chair", w. Henry S. Washburn (1861), m. George Frederick Root (1862)

== Classical music ==
- Peter Benoit
  - Fantaisie No.4, Op.20
  - Piano Sonata, Op.34, premiered March 21 by Angèle Tailhardat
  - Hoogmis, premiered July 21 in Brussels
- Hermann Berens – 50 Piano Pieces for First Beginners, Op.70
- Alexander Borodin – Piano Trio in D major
- Johannes Brahms
  - Variations on a Theme by Robert Schumann Op.23 (based on Schumann's “last musical thought,” sketched in February 1854)
  - Variations and Fugue on a Theme by Handel Op.24
  - Piano Quartet No.1, Op.25
  - Piano Quartet No.2, Op.26
- Anton Bruckner
  - Afferentur regi, WAB 1
  - Am Grabe, WAB 2
  - Ave Maria, WAB 6
  - Du bist wie eine Blume, WAB 64, dated December 5
  - Fugue in D minor, WAB 125, dated November 8
- Antonín Dvořák – String Quintet No. 1 in A minor, Op. 1
- Hermann Goetz – Piano Concerto in E-flat
- Edvard Grieg – 4 Songs, Op.2
- Arthur Sullivan – The Tempest, premiered April 6 in Leipzig.
- Thomas Dyke Acland Tellefsen
  - Marche triomphale, Op.29
  - Grande Valses, Op.30
  - Piano Trio, Op.31
- Henri Vieuxtemps – Violin Concerto No. 5
- Robert Volkmann
  - Ungarische Skizzen, Op.24
  - String Quartet No.6, Op.43

== Opera ==
- Daniel François Esprit Auber – La Circassienne, premiered February 2 in Paris
- Ferenc Erkel – Bánk bán
- Stanislaw Moniuszko – Verbum Nobile
- Amilcare Ponchielli – La Savoiarda

== Musical theater ==
- Orpheus In The Underworld by Offenbach, New York production (first performed in Paris, 1858)

== Published Methods and Writings ==
- John Curwen – How to Observe Harmony
- John Hullah – The History of Modern Music
- Carl von Ledebur – Tonkünstler-Lexicon Berlin's
- Jean-Joseph Rodolphe – Solfège
- Eugène Sauzay – Haydn, Mozart, Beethoven
- Franz Xaver Schnyder von Wartensee – Aesthetische Betrachtungen über die Schöpfung

== Births ==
- February 1 – Emilio Pizzi, composer (died 1940)
- February 21 – Pierre de Bréville, composer (d. 1949)
- April 7 – Clara Novello Davies, singer, conductor and music teacher (d. 1943)
- April 26 – Ferdinand Buescher, instrument manufacturer (d. 1937)
- April 27 – Georgy Catoire, composer (died 1926)
- May 10 – Francisco Cimadevilla González, guitarist and composer (d. 1931)
- May 12 – Ivan Caryll, composer (died 1921)
- May 19 – Nellie Melba, operatic soprano (d. 1931)
- June 11 – Sigismund Zaremba, composer (d. 1915)
- June 15 – Ernestine Schumann-Heink, operatic contralto (d. 1936)
- June 17 – Sidney Jones, composer of musical comedies (d. 1946)
- June 27 – Fanny Davies, pianist (d. 1934)
- July 16 – Franz von Blon, composer (died 1945)
- August 11 – Anton Arensky, pianist and composer (d. 1906)
- August 19 – Sadie Martinot, actress and soprano singer (d. 1923)
- September 7 – Thomas Whitney Surette, composer (died 1941)
- November 3 – Thomas O'Brien Butler, composer (died 1915)
- November 19 – Theodor Mannborg, organ maker (died 1930)
- November 29 – Spyridon Samaras, Greek opera composer, who also set to music the Olympic Anthem (d. 1917)
- November 30 – Ludwig Thuille, composer (died 1907)
- December 5 – James Thornton, English-born US songwriter and vaudeville comedian (d. 1938)
- December 18 – Lionel Monckton, composer of musical comedies (d. 1924)
- date unknown
  - Camille D'elmar, opera singer (d. 1902)
  - Giuseppe Fiorini, musical instrument maker (d. 1934)
  - Ferdinand Ellsworth Olds, instrument manufacturer (d. 1928)

== Deaths ==
- January 17 – Lola Montez, dancer (b. 1821)
- January 22 – Giovanni Velluti, castrato singer (b. 1780)
- February 12 – Hippolyte André Jean Baptiste Chélard, conductor and composer (b. 1789)
- February 20 – Eugène Scribe, librettist (b. 1791)
- March 14 – Louis Niedermeyer, composer (b. 1802)
- May 3 – Anthony Philip Heinrich, composer (b. 1781)
- August 9 – Vincent Novello, composer and music publisher (b. 1781)
- August 11 – Catherine Hayes, soprano (born c. 1818)
- October 24 – Elisabeth Frösslind, opera singer (b. 1793)
- December 14 – Heinrich Marschner, composer (b. 1795)
- December 16 – Karol Lipiński, violinist and composer (b. 1790)
- December 18 – Ernst Anschütz, organist, composer and poet (b. 1780)
- December 25 – Natale Abbadia, composer (b. 1792)
