= Come and Get It (1936 film) =

1936 American drama film directed by Howard Hawks and William Wyler

- Directed by: Howard Hawks; William Wyler
- Written by: Jane Murfin; Jules Furthman
- Based on: Come and Get It; 1935 novel by Edna Ferber
- Produced by: Samuel Goldwyn
- Starring: Edward Arnold; Joel McCrea; Frances Farmer; Walter Brennan
- Cinematography: Gregg Toland; Rudolph Maté
- Edited by: Edward Curtiss
- Music by: Alfred Newman
- Production company: Samuel Goldwyn Productions
- Distributed by: United Artists
- Release date: November 6, 1936
- Running time: 99 minutes
- Country: United States
- Language: English

Come and Get It is a 1936 American lumberjack drama film directed by Howard Hawks and William Wyler. The screenplay by Jane Murfin and Jules Furthman is based on the 1935 novel of the same title by Edna Ferber.

For his performance as Swan Bostrom, Walter Brennan became the first recipient of the Academy Award for Best Supporting Actor.

== Plot ==
Ruthless lumberjack foreman Barney Glasgow (Edward Arnold) will stop at nothing to achieve his goal to someday become the head of the logging industry in 19th century Wisconsin. His determination to succeed leads him to end his relationship with saloon singer Lotta Morgan (Frances Farmer) and marry Emma Louise Hewitt (Mary Nash), the daughter of his boss Jed Hewett (Charles Halton), in order to secure a partnership in his business.

Over two decades later Richard (Joel McCrea), the couple's wealthy and successful son, strongly objects to his father's practice of destroying forests without planting new trees. Barney visits his old friend Swan Bostrom (Walter Brennan), who married Lotta when Barney rejected her. Swan is now a widower raising a daughter, also named Lotta (and also played by Frances Farmer), who bears a striking resemblance to her mother.

Barney finds himself attracted to the girl and, foolishly hoping to recapture the love he abandoned as a young man, offers to finance her education. Complications arise when his son Richard meets Lotta and takes a strong interest in her, which is reciprocated. Barney is jealous and displeased.

== Cast ==
- Edward Arnold as Barney Glasgow
- Frances Farmer as Lotta Morgan/Lotta Bostrom
- Walter Brennan as Swan Bostrom
- Joel McCrea as Richard Glasgow
- Mady Christians as Karie
- Mary Nash as Emma Louise Glasgow
- Andrea Leeds as Evvie Glasgow
- Charles Halton as Jed Hewitt
- Frank Shields as Tony Schwerke
- Edwin Maxwell as Sid LeMaire
- Cecil Cunningham as Josie

== Production ==
Samuel Goldwyn paid $150,000 for the screen rights to the novel by Edna Ferber, who sold it to him on the basis that the film would be "primarily a story of the rape of America . . . by the wholesale robber barons of that day." Goldwyn was attracted to the melodramatic aspects of the story which called to mind director, Howard Hawks' film Barbary Coast, prompting him to hire Hawks for the picture. He also was intrigued by the fact Hawks' grandfather had served as the basis for the character of Barney Glasgow. Ferber had approved Jane Murfin's script, which Hawks found wanting, and he persuaded her and Goldwyn to allow him to bring in Jules Furthman to work on a rewrite.

Goldwyn announced Miriam Hopkins would play the dual roles of Lotta Morgan and Lotta Bostrom, but Hawks was not happy with his choice. He looked at numerous screen tests of aspiring starlets and finally settled on Andrea Leeds, who previously had played minor or uncredited roles in a handful of films. Eventually he replaced her with the even less experienced Frances Farmer and cast Leeds in the supporting role of Evvie Glasgow, Richard's younger sister, instead. Goldwyn tried to borrow Spencer Tracy from MGM for the lead role of Barney Glasgow, but Louis B. Mayer refused to let him work for his chief rival, so contract player Edward Arnold was assigned the role.

Soon after filming began, Goldwyn underwent two major surgeries that incapacitated him for a lengthy period of time, keeping him away from the studio and the daily rushes. Hawks took advantage of the situation and allowed Furthman to change completely the tone of Ferber's original story; cast slender Walter Brennan as Swan Bostrom, a man Ferber had described as "the strongest man in the North woods;" and arrange a shooting schedule and budget Goldwyn never would have approved.

Upon returning to the studio, Goldwyn viewed a rough cut of the film and was shocked to discover Hawks had shifted the focus from the unbridled destruction of the land to a love triangle in which brawling Barney Glasgow and Swan Bostrom vied for the affections of lusty Lotta Morgan. The character of Richard Glasgow, intended to be the second lead, barely was in the film, which was cluttered with Hawks-like improvised bits of business. When the director refused to comply with Goldwyn's demands for major changes, the producer fired Hawks from the project.

William Wyler had begun post-production work on future Academy Award Best Picture-nominated Dodsworth when he was summoned to Goldwyn's home and told he would be completing Come and Get It. Wyler was loath to take over a film started by someone else, but Goldwyn threatened him with suspension if he refused to accept the assignment. He did so reluctantly, and in later years he recalled, "I was talked into doing it, and I've been sorry about that ever since. The picture wasn't very good." Wyler spent two weeks filming what amounted to about the final third of the completed film. He strongly objected to Goldwyn's desire to give him sole directing credit, and preferred his name not be attached to the film at all. He finally relented but only when Goldwyn agreed to give Hawks top billing. Wyler never considered Come and Get It a part of his filmography and disowned it whenever he could, although it greatly pleased Ferber, who praised Goldwyn "for the courage, sagacity, and power of decision" he demonstrated by "throwing out the finished Hawks picture and undertaking the gigantic task of making what amounted to a new picture."

Exterior scenes were filmed along the North Fork Clearwater River in Idaho.

The soundtrack includes "Aura Lea" by George R. Poulton and W. W. Fosdick and "The Bird on Nellie's Hat" by Alfred Solman and Arthur J. Lamb.

== Critical reception ==
Frank S. Nugent of The New York Times, in his contemporary (1936) review, said that compressing Ferber's 50-year saga into the story of a single generation "arrested the panoramic sweep of the story, converting it from a mural of the American scene into a vividly toned portrait of a man. But the transformation is readily excusable, for Barney was the heart of the novel and we felt it had stopped beating when he died." He added, "Although there is nothing new in the theme, it has been simply and powerfully expressed by a number of admirable performances, and it has been played against an interesting background. There are several extraordinarily graphic scenes of logging operations, the atmosphere of the late Eighties and early Nineties has been reproduced handsomely in the settings and costumes and . . . it never fails to reward your attention. There's nothing static about this one, thanks to Howard Hawks and William Wyler, the directors; to Gregg Toland's photography, and to the work of a uniformly fine cast." He concluded, "You won't find Come and Get It a thoroughly Ferber work, but enough of her has been retained and enough good Goldwyn added to make it a genuinely satisfying picture."

British Channel 4 observed, "It's a minor Hawks, to be sure, and the action does tend to lag at times, but the fine performances from Farmer, Brennan and McCrea are what make it."

== Awards and honors ==
For his performance, Walter Brennan became the first recipient of the Academy Award for Best Supporting Actor. Edward Curtiss was nominated for the Academy Award for Best Film Editing but lost to Ralph Dawson for Anthony Adverse.

== Adaptations ==
Edward Arnold and Walter Brennan reprised their respective roles of Barney Glasgow and Swan Bostrom in two radio adaptations of the Ferber novel. The first aired as a one-hour production on Lux Radio Theatre on November 15, 1937, and the second was a half-hour version broadcast by The Screen Guild Theater on March 15, 1942.
