= True Love (Cole Porter song) =

1956 song by Cole Porter

Single by Bing Crosby and Grace Kelly

from the album High Society
- B-side: "Well, Did You Evah!"
- Released: August 1956
- Recorded: February 22, 1956
- Genre: Traditional pop
- Length: 3:07
- Label: Capitol
- Songwriter: Cole Porter
- Producer: Johnny Green

"True Love"

Single by Richard Chamberlain

from the album Richard Chamberlain Sings
- B-side: "I Will Love You"
- Released: 1963
- Recorded: 1963
- Genre: Soul
- Length: 2:17
- Label: MGM
- Songwriter: Cole Porter

Richard Chamberlain singles chronology
"All I Have to Do Is Dream/Hi-Lili, Hi-Lo" (1963)	"True Love" (1963)	"Blue Guitar" (1963)

"True Love"

Single by George Harrison

from the album Thirty Three & 1/3
- B-side: "Pure Smokey"
- Released: February 18, 1977
- Length: 2:45
- Label: Dark Horse
- Songwriter: Cole Porter

George Harrison singles chronology
"Crackerbox Palace" (1977)	"True Love" (1977)	"It's What You Value" (1977)

"True Love"

Single by Elton John and Kiki Dee

from the album Duets
- B-side: "The Show Must Go On", "Runaway Train"
- Released: November 8, 1993
- Length: 3:33
- Label: Rocket
- Songwriter: Cole Porter
- Producer: Narada Michael Walden

Elton John singles chronology
"Simple Life" (1993)	"True Love" (1993)	"Don't Go Breaking My Heart" (1994)

Kiki Dee singles chronology
"Angel Eyes" (1987)	"True Love" (1993)

"True Love" is a popular song written by American songwriter Cole Porter, published in 1956. The song was introduced by Bing Crosby and Grace Kelly in the musical film High Society. "True Love" was nominated for the Academy Award for Best Original Song. Kelly's contribution on the record is relatively minor, duetting with Crosby on only the final chorus. Nonetheless, the single is co-credited to her.

== Background ==
The Crosby-Kelly version, accompanied by Johnny Green's MGM studio orchestra using a romantic arrangement by Conrad Salinger, was a hit single, peaking at number four in the United Kingdom, number three in Australia and number one in the Netherlands.

== Recordings that charted ==
- Richard Chamberlain released a cover of the song as a single in 1963; it peaked at number 30 in the United Kingdom and number 98 in the US.
- A version by Shakin' Stevens from his 1988 album A Whole Lotta Shaky reached number 23 in the UK.
- In 1993, British musicians Elton John and Kiki Dee recorded the song for John's album Duets; the single reached number two on the UK singles chart and Irish Singles Chart, number four in Belgium, number seven in Iceland, number 12 in Canada, and number 56 in the United States.

== Other recordings ==
Other versions to achieve success include:

- A version of the song by Jane Powell out at the same time as the Crosby–Kelly version was also popular.
- Elvis Presley cut a version of "True Love" that was featured on his successful album Loving You from 1957.
- Ricky Nelson included a version of the song on his 1957 debut album Ricky.
- Dean Martin recorded the song for his 1960 LP This Time I'm Swingin'!.
- In 1961 Patsy Cline covered the song on her second studio album, Patsy Cline Showcase.
- Shelley Fabares cut a version of the song on her album Shelley! released in 1962.
- Al Hirt released a version on his 1962 album, Trumpet and Strings.
- The Everly Brothers recorded a version for their 1962 album Instant Party without any commercial success.
- A version by Nancy Sinatra was released as a single in 1965.
- Jack Jones, 1965, as the closing tune for There's Love and There's Love and There's Love, an album of romance classics arranged by Nelson Riddle;
- The song has also featured on a number of albums cut by Connie Francis.
- A version of "True Love" is on the 1974 album I'm Leaving It All Up to You by Donny and Marie Osmond.
- A version by George Harrison done in a blues rock style, from his 1976 album Thirty Three & 1/3, was released as the album's third single in 1977.
- The short-lived 1980s band Oasis recorded a version on their one album, Oasis, in 1984.
- Anne Murray recorded a cover of the song for her album Croonin' (1993).
- Neil Diamond covered the song for his 1998 album The Movie Album: As Time Goes By.
- Deana Martin recorded "True Love" on her 2013 album Destination Moon as a duet with her father, Dean Martin, who originally recorded the song for his 1960 album This Time I'm Swingin'!.
- Benny Anderssons orkester on the live CD BAO på turné in 2006.
- Harry Connick Jr. recorded the song for his 2019 album True Love: A Celebration of Cole Porter.

== Charts ==
=== Weekly charts ===
Bing Crosby and Grace Kelly version

Chart (1956–1957)	Peak position
Australia (Kent Music Report)	3
Belgium (Ultratop 50 Flanders)	19
Belgium (Ultratip Bubbling Under Wallonia)	–
Netherlands (Single Top 100)	1
UK Singles (Official Charts)	4
US Billboard Most Played by Disc Jockeys	3

Richard Chamberlain version

Chart (1963)	Peak position
UK Singles (Official Charts)	30
US Billboard Hot 100	98

Shakin' Stevens version

Chart (1988)	Peak position
UK Singles (Official Charts)	23

Elton John and Kiki Dee version

Chart (1993–1994)	Peak position
Australia (ARIA)	34
Austria (Ö3 Austria Top 40)	22
Belgium (Ultratop 50 Flanders)	4
Canada Top Singles (RPM)	12
Canada Adult Contemporary (RPM)	8
Europe (Eurochart Hot 100)	4
France (SNEP)	19
Germany (GfK)	38
Iceland (Íslenski Listinn Topp 40)	7
Ireland (IRMA)	2
Netherlands (Dutch Top 40)	11
Netherlands (Single Top 100)	12
Portugal (AFP)	10
Switzerland (Schweizer Hitparade)	11
UK Singles (Official Charts)	2
US Billboard Hot 100	56
US Adult Contemporary (Billboard)	21
US Cash Box Top 100	58

=== Year-end charts ===
Bing Crosby and Grace Kelly version

Chart (1957)	Position
Australia (Kent Music Report)	8
Belgium (Ultratop 50 Flanders)	76

Elton John and Kiki Dee version

Chart (1993)	Position
UK Singles (OCC)	29

Chart (1994)	Position
Belgium (Ultratop)	63
Canada Top Singles (RPM)	90
Canada Adult Contemporary (RPM)	78
Europe (Eurochart Hot 100)	77

== Certifications ==
Region	Certification	Certified units/sales
United Kingdom (BPI) Elton John and Kiki Dee version	Silver	200,000^{^}
^{^} Shipments figures based on certification alone.

== In popular culture ==
- "True Love" is the name of a yacht on which two of the characters honeymoon in the play The Philadelphia Story, on which the musical is based. Bing Crosby later owned a 55-foot Constellation yacht which he named the "True Love".
- On the episode of The Muppet Show with special guest Cheryl Ladd, Miss Piggy and Link Hogthrob sing "True Love" as a duet in the opening number. In their performance, they are in the jungle surrounded by wild animals such as a monkey, an alligator, and many birds who also sing portions of the song.
