= Love Me Tender (song) =

1956 song by Elvis Presley

Single by Elvis Presley

from the EP Love Me Tender
- B-side: "Any Way You Want Me"
- Released: September 14, 1956
- Recorded: August 24, 1956
- Studio: 20th Century Fox Studios, Los Angeles, California
- Length: 2:41
- Label: RCA Victor
- Songwriters: Music: George R. Poulton; Lyrics: Ken Darby (uncredited, credited to "Elvis Presley & Vera Matson")
- Producers: Ernie Oehlrich; Thorne Norgar

Elvis Presley singles chronology
"Shake, Rattle And Roll" (1956)	"Love Me Tender" (1956)	"Too Much" (1957)

"Love Me Tender"

Single by Richard Chamberlain

from the album Richard Chamberlain Sings
- B-side: "All I Do Is Dream of You"
- Released: 1962
- Genre: Country
- Label: MGM
- Songwriters: Elvis Presley; Vera Matson

Richard Chamberlain singles chronology
"Theme From Dr. Kildare (Three Stars Will Shine Tonight)" (1962)	"Love Me Tender" (1962)	"All I Have to Do Is Dream" / "Hi-Lili, Hi-Lo" (1963)

"Love Me Tender" is a 1956 ballad song recorded by Elvis Presley and published by "Elvis Presley Music" from the 20th Century Fox film of the same name. Lyrics are credited to "Vera Matson" (though the actual lyricist was her husband, Ken Darby). The melody is the sentimental Civil War ballad "Aura Lea" (sometimes spelled "Aura Lee") by the Englishman George R. Poulton. The RCA Victor recording by Elvis Presley was No. 1 on both the Billboard and Cashbox charts in 1956.

== History ==
The 1956 song "Love Me Tender" puts new words to a new musical adaptation of the Civil War song "Aura Lea", published in 1861. "Aura Lea" had music by George R. Poulton and words by W. W. Fosdick. It later became popular with college glee clubs and barbershop quartets. It was also sung at the United States Military Academy at West Point, New York.

The principal writer of the lyrics was Ken Darby who also adapted Poulton's Civil War tune, which was in the public domain. The song was published by Elvis Presley Music. and credited to Presley and Darby's wife Vera Matson. Presley received co-songwriting credit due to his Hill & Range publishing deal which demanded songwriters concede 50 percent of the credit of their song if they wanted Presley to record it; Presley had songwriting input on only a very small number of the many songs he recorded. For "Love Me Tender" he wrote two lines but did not remember which ones. Darby was often asked about his decision to credit the song to his wife along with Presley, and his standard response was an acid, "because she didn't write it either". In actuality, Ken Darby wasn't credited because he was represented by another musicians association.

As with nearly all his early RCA recordings, Presley took control in the studio despite not being credited as producer. He would regularly change arrangements and self-produced years before other artists were known as producers. Ken Darby described Elvis Presley's role in the recording of the song:

He adjusted the music and the lyrics to his own particular presentation. Elvis has the most terrific ear of anyone I have ever met. He does not read music, but he does not need to. All I had to do was play the song for him once, and he made it his own! He has perfect judgment of what is right for him. He exercised that judgment when he chose 'Love Me Tender' as his theme song.

Elvis Presley performed "Love Me Tender" on The Ed Sullivan Show on September 9, 1956, shortly before the single's release and about a month before the movie, Love Me Tender, was released (for which the reworded song had been written). After that, RCA received more than a million advance orders, making it a gold record before it was even released. The studio, 20th Century Fox, originally wanted to call the movie The Reno Brothers, but instead re-titled it Love Me Tender to capitalize on the song's popularity.

Movie producer David Weisbart would not allow Presley's regular band (Scotty Moore, Bill Black, and D. J. Fontana) to play on the soundtrack. Instead, The Ken Darby Trio provided the musical backing with Red Robinson on drums, Charles Prescott on bass, Vita Mumolo on guitar, and Jon Dodson on background vocals, with Presley providing only lead vocals.

== Elvis Presley recording ==
Ken Darby and Elvis Presley in the studio.

The single debuted at No. 2 on the "Best Sellers in Stores" pop singles chart, the first time a single made its first appearance at the No. 2 position.

The song hit No. 1 on the Billboard charts the week ending November 3, 1956, remaining in the position for 5 weeks and reached no. 11 on the charts in the UK. "Love Me Tender" also reached number three for three weeks on the R&B chart. This version was ranked No. 437 on Rolling Stone's list of the 500 Greatest Songs of All Time. In 1968, Presley recorded a 52-second track entitled "Violet (Flower of N.Y.U.)" for the soundtrack of the film The Trouble with Girls. Unreleased until after Presley's death, the song was Presley's second adaptation of "Aura Lee".

Although Presley never re-recorded "Love Me Tender" in a studio setting, two live recordings of the song were released on the albums: NBC-TV Special and Elvis: As Recorded at Madison Square Garden, with additional performances from concert and television appearances being released after Presley's death. The song was also performed in the Golden Globe-winning concert film Elvis on Tour (1972). As seen in that film, and in other filmed and recorded accounts, Presley generally performed only a portion of the song's lyrics live, instead usually using the song as a device to interact with (usually) female members of the audience. "Love Me Tender" was also included in the four-song extended play (EP) album Love Me Tender of the songs from the film. The reprise of the song was not included on the EP. In 2010, a remixed version was released featuring singer Dea Norberg and makes a mashup with the snippet of 1965 song "In My Way" and was released on Viva Elvis: The Album . In 2015, another version was made accompanied by new orchestral arrangement by the Royal Philharmonic Orchestra and was released on album If I Can Dream.

== Versions ==
- Love Me Tender – 2:41 – Recorded Aug 24, 1956
- Love Me Tender (End title version) – 1:08 - Recorded Oct 01, 1956
- Love Me Tender (Stereo version) – 2:42 - Recorded Aug 24, 1956

The 1997 compact disc reissue with bonus tracks of the Jailhouse Rock EP contains these three versions.

== Other recordings ==
- Richard Chamberlain reached No. 21 on the Billboard Hot 100 singles chart with his version when it was released as a single in 1962 on MGM, No. 15 in the UK, and No. 31 in Canada. It was included on his 1962 album, Richard Chamberlain Sings.
- Percy Sledge had a hit with a cover version in 1967, going to No. 40 on the US Hot 100, No. 35 on the R&B chart, No. 9 on the Canadian R&B chart, and No. 35 on the Canadian pop chart.
- Roland Rat Superstar's version charted at No. 32 in the UK in 1984.

== Charts ==
=== Weekly charts ===
Chart (1956)	Peak position
Australia	6
Austria	10
Canada	1
UK Singles Chart	11
US Billboard Best Sellers in Stores	1
US Billboard Most Played by Jockeys	1
US Billboard Most Played in Jukeboxes	1
US Billboard Country	3
US Billboard R&B	3
US Cash Box Top 100	1

=== Year-end charts ===
Chart (1956)	Rank
US Cash Box	27

== Certifications ==
Region	Certification	Certified units/sales
United Kingdom (BPI)	Silver	200,000^{‡}
United States (RIAA)	3× Platinum	3,000,000^{^}
^{^} Shipments figures based on certification alone.^{‡} Sales+streaming figures based on certification alone.
