= Richard Chamberlain Sings =

Studio album by Richard Chamberlain
- Released: 1962
- Genre: Vocalist pop
- Label: MGM
- Producer: Jesse Kaye

Richard Chamberlain chronology
Richard Chamberlain Sings (1962)	Twilight of Honor (1963)

Singles from Richard Chamberlain Sings
- 1. "Theme from Dr. Kildare (Three Stars Will Shine Tonight)" Released: May 1962; 2. "Love Me Tender" Released: September 1962; 3. "All I Have to Do Is Dream / Hi-Lili, Hi-Lo" Released: January 1963; 4. "I Will Love You / True Love" Released: June 1963

Richard Chamberlain Sings is the first album released by actor Richard Chamberlain. It became his most popular album and spawned several hit singles.

== Charts ==
The album reached No. 8 on UK Albums Chart and No. 5 on the US Billboard Top LPs chart.

"Love Me Tender" was released as a single and reached No. 21 on the Billboard Hot 100 singles chart, No. 15 in the UK singles chart and No. 31 in Canada.

== Reception ==
Professional ratings
Review scores
Source	Rating
AllMusic	4.5/5 stars
Cashbox	Positive

Greg Adams on AllMusic says that "The 'golden throat' of celebrity vocalist Richard Chamberlain can actually sing. On his debut album, Richard Chamberlain Sings, he sounds a bit like Pat Boone and Joe Dowell while performing well-enunciated pop ballads in a gentle, orchestrated teen-idol style."

Cashbox magazine stated that "Chamberlain’s straight forward renditions of both ballads and uptempo items have earned him a significant niche in new crop of young thespian-chanters," adding that he displayed "his wide range and versatility by rendering a highly listenable program of pop favorites."

== Track listing ==
1. "Hi-Lili, Hi-Lo" (Bronisław Kaper, Helen Deutsch)
2. "All I Have to Do Is Dream" (Boudleaux Bryant)
3. "I Will Love You" (Barry De Vorzon, Shelby Flint)
4. "I Hadn't Anyone 'Til You" (Ray Noble)
5. "Theme from Dr. Kildare (Three Stars Will Shine Tonight)" (Hal Winn, Jerry Goldsmith, Pete Rugolo)
6. "It's a Lonesome Old Town (When You're Not Around)" (Charles Kisco, Harry Tobias)
7. "True Love" (Cole Porter)
8. "I'll Be Around" (Alec Wilder)
9. "Love Me Tender" (Vera Matson, Elvis Presley)
10. "All I Do Is Dream of You" (Arthur Freed, Nacio Herb Brown)
11. "A Quiet Kind of Love" (Sheldon Allman)

== Personnel ==
- Jimmie Haskell – arrangements, conductor
- David Rose – arranger, conductor on "Theme from Dr. Kildare"
- Val Valentin – director of engineering
- Gene Trindl – cover photography
