= Julia Dean (actress, born 1830) =

American actress

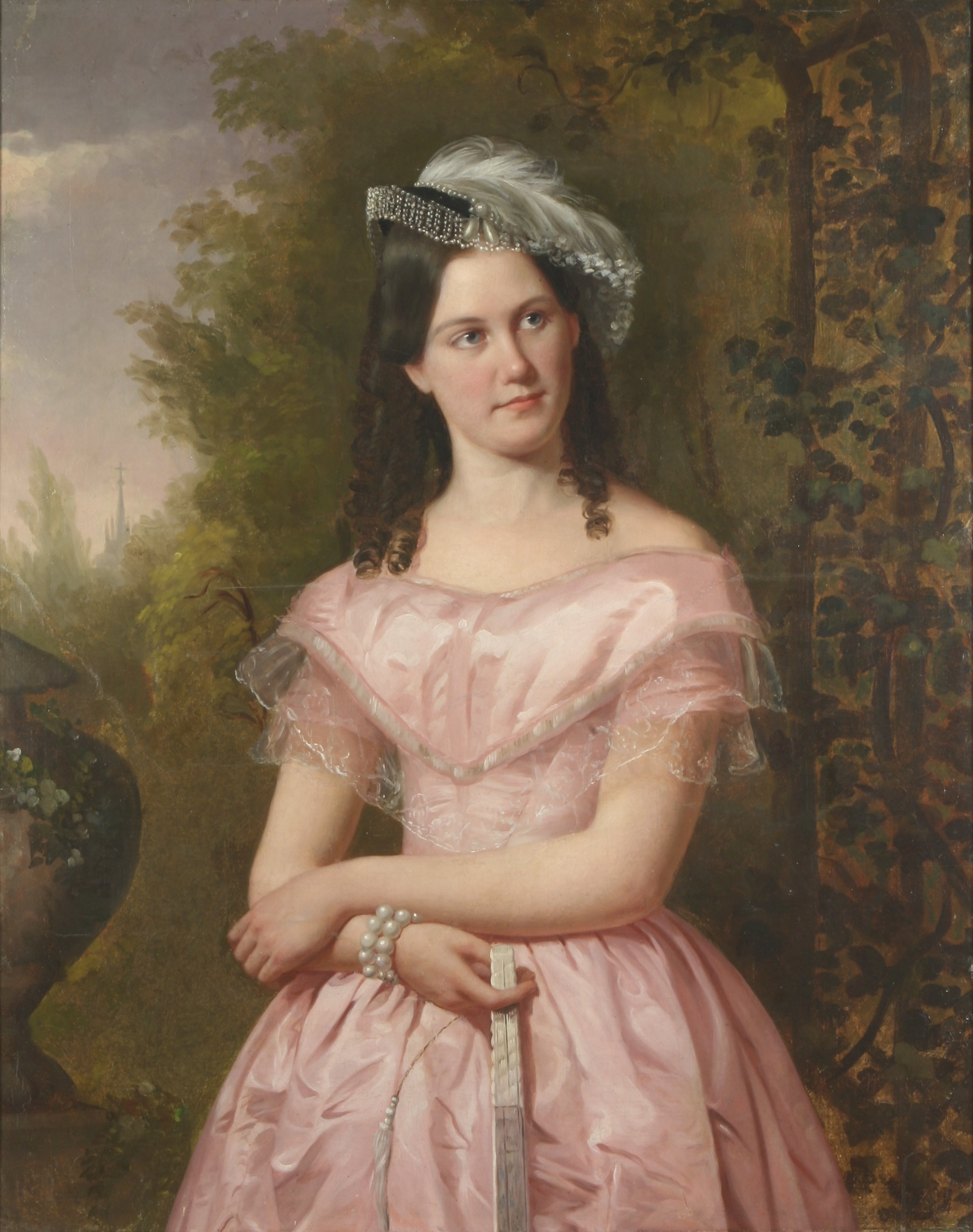
- Oil portrait by Joseph Oriel Eaton
- Born: July 22, 1830; Pleasant Valley, New York, US
- Died: March 6, 1868 (aged 37); New York City, US
- Resting place: Laurel Grove Cemetery, Port Jervis, New York
- Other names: Julia Dean Hayne; Julia Dean Cooper
- Occupation: Stage Actress
- Years active: 1846–1867
- Spouses: Arthur P. Hayne; James G. Cooper

Julia Dean (July 22, 1830 – March 6, 1868) was an American actress who made her New York debut at 16 in a starring role with the James Sheridan Knowles comedy, The Hunchback. Her performance was met with such praise that she continued to star in productions of The Hunchback over much of her twenty-year career. Although she began and ended her career on the East coast, Dean's greatest popularity was achieved in tours of the American South and the Far West. Dean was married twice; she was the mother of four children, but died in childbirth with a stillborn son at the age of 37.

== Early life ==
Dean was born in Pleasant Valley, New York, the daughter of Edwin Dean (1804–1876) and Julia Drake (1800–1832). Her father, an actor and theatre manager, was born in Poughkeepsie, the son of Quakers Her English-born mother was also an actor who achieved a degree of notoriety on the American stage. A half-brother, from Julia Drake's first marriage, was the poet William W. Fosdick and a niece, born some ten years after Dean's death, became the stage and film actress, Julia Dean. Her grandfather, Samuel Drake, came to America in 1810, and is thought to have been the first to bring a theatre troupe west of the Appalachians. According to Noah Miller Ludlow, his birth name may have been Samuel Drake Bryant, before adopting his stage name. Dean's mother died when her daughter was around two, leaving her to be raised by paternal grandparents until Edwin Dean remarried eight or nine years later.

For several years Dean did chores at a family-owned boardinghouse before going on the stage in 1844, as a $6 a-week bit player with Ludlow and Smith of Mobile, Alabama. She shared the stage with Joseph Jefferson, another bit player in the formative years of his career. With Ludlow and Smith, the young actress became a popular attraction prompting her father to bring her to New York City at the close of the 1844–45 season.

== Career ==
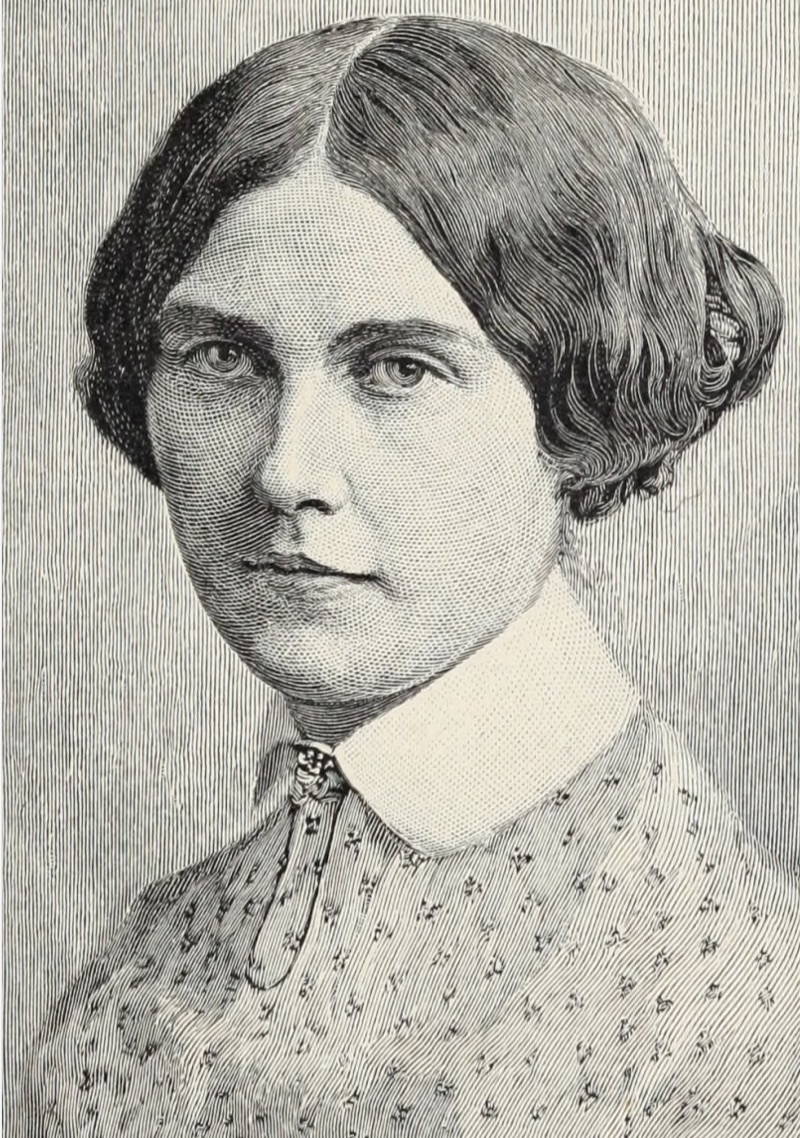

Her first stage appearance was at age 12 in a minor role in Last Days of Pompeii, presented in the theater managed by her father in Rochester, New York in the early 1840s.

On May 18, 1846, she made her New York debut at the Bowery Theatre in the principal role of Julia, in Knowles’ comedy The Hunchback, and on October 26, 1846, she reprised the role at Boston's National Theater. Dean subsequently played Julia in a successful Southern tour of The Hunchback. In the March 7, 1868 edition of The New York Times, the paper said of her debut performance:

[This was] a part that she almost monopolized on the American stage, for the immediately succeeding years. Speaking of this debut and of Julia Dean's early years, Ireland in his History of the New York Stage wrote: "Youthful, graceful, delicately pretty, with a slight Hibernian cast of features, she at once awakened the public interest, and her intelligence and graceful study lent a charm to her performance which soon carried her to a point of popularity rarely exceeded".

Leading roles which Dean played over her career would include Camille, Lady Macbeth, Lea in Leah the Forsaken, Parthenia in Ingomar the Barbarian, Lucretia Borgia, Medea, Marco in Charles Selby's The Marble Heart, Lady Teazle, Peg Woffington, Bianca in Fazio, Mary Stillworth in Mary's Birthday and Pauline Deschapelles in The Lady of Lyons. Dean was the original Norma in Epes Sargent's Priestess, and the first to play Leonor in George Henry Boker's tragedy about Eleanor de Guzmán.

Dean lived in the West for a number of years, primarily in San Francisco and Salt Lake City. There she became a popular attraction throughout the Western United States and British Columbia. She eventually returned east not long after the close of the American Civil War in tours that at times would find success elusive. Her final noteworthy roles were Ann Catherick and Laura Fairlie, in a dramatization of Wilkie Collins' novel The Woman in White. Of her forte, Appletons' Cyclopaedia of American Biography said in 1898, She excelled in juvenile tragedy and high comedy parts.

== Marriage ==
She married Dr. Arthur P. Hayne, a son of South Carolina Senator Robert Y. Hayne, on January 20, 1855, at Galveston, Texas. Two daughters and two sons were born to this union of which only Arthur lived to see adulthood, dying in 1883 at about the age of 27. Her marriage was widely reported as troubled. She eventually secured a divorce in the mid-1860s, and not long afterwards married, at Salt Lake City, James G. Cooper, a native of New York who served with the federal administration of the Utah Territory.

== Death ==
Over the last several years of her life, Dean began to struggle with health issues involving her throat and a possible nervous disorder. She died at her in-laws’ house in New York City on March 6, 1868, following the stillbirth of her fifth child. Dean's funeral services were held at Christ Church on the corner of 5th Avenue and 35th Street; her remains were laid to rest at Laurel Grove Cemetery, Port Jervis, New York. Some years later Dean's namesake niece found her unmarked gravestone and had it replaced with a more substantial marker.
