= Richard Chamberlain =

American actor and singer (1934–2025)

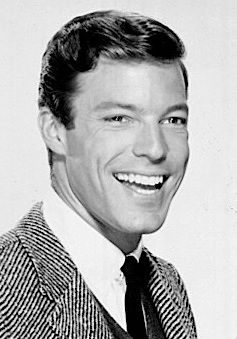
- Chamberlain in 1964
- Born: George Richard Chamberlain; March 31, 1934; Los Angeles, California, U.S.
- Died: March 29, 2025 (aged 90); Waimānalo, Hawaii, U.S.
- Education: Pomona College (BA, 1956)
- Occupations: Actor; singer
- Years active: 1958–2019
- Partners: Wesley Eure (1975–1976); Martin Rabbett (1977–2010)
- Military career
- Allegiance: US
- Branch: United States Army
- Service years: 1956–1958
- Rank: Sergeant
- Musical career
- Genres: pop; musical theatre
- Label: MGM

George Richard Chamberlain (March 31, 1934 – March 29, 2025) was an American actor and singer whose career on stage and in film and television spanned over 60 years. He was the recipient of many accolades, including three Golden Globe Awards (out of 6 total nominations), four Primetime Emmy Awards nominations, two Drama Desk Award nominations, and a Grammy Award nomination.

After early stage experiences, Chamberlain became a teen idol in the title role of the popular television show Dr. Kildare (1961–66). He subsequently earned the title "King of the Mini-Series" for his work in several high-profile TV miniseries, such as Centennial (1978), Shōgun (1980), and The Thorn Birds (1983). He also performed classical stage roles and worked in musical theater, and was twice nominated for the Drama Desk Award for Outstanding Actor in a Play.

In film, Chamberlain starred as Aramis in the film trilogy The Three Musketeers (1973), The Four Musketeers (1974), and The Return of the Musketeers (1989); portrayed Allan Quatermain in both King Solomon's Mines (1985) and Lost City of Gold (1986); and was the first actor to play Jason Bourne, starring in the 1988 television film The Bourne Identity. He starred in the Australian New Wave film The Last Wave (1977), directed by Peter Weir, earning him a AACTA Award nomination for Best Actor in a Leading Role. He also had a brief career as a pop singer in the 1960s.

== Early life ==
George Richard Chamberlain was born on March 31, 1934, at the now-closed Angelus Hospital on Washington Boulevard in Los Angeles, the second son of Elsa Winnifred (née von Benzon; later Matthews) and Charles Axion "Chuck" Chamberlain, who was a shop equipment salesman from Indiana. His mother was of part German descent. Charles worked in real estate and the supermarket business before running a refrigerator business from 1956 to 1970 and, later, authoring the book "A New Pair of Glasses". Chamberlain had a brother, William, who worked alongside their father in the family business. Chamberlain graduated from Beverly Hills High School in 1952 and in 1956 from Pomona College with a bachelor's degree in art history and painting. He was drafted into the United States Army and served from 1956 to 1958. He attained the rank of sergeant while stationed in post-war Korea.

== Career ==
Chamberlain co-founded a Los Angeles–based theater group Company of Angels, and began appearing on television in guest roles in the early 1960s. In 1961, he gained widespread fame as the young intern Dr. James Kildare in the NBC/MGM television series of the same name, co-starring with Raymond Massey. Chamberlain's singing ability also led to some hit singles in the early 1960s, including the "Theme from Dr. Kildare (Three Stars Will Shine Tonight)," which reached No. 10 on the Billboard Hot 100 Charts. Dr. Kildare ended in 1966, after which Chamberlain began performing on the theater circuit. In 1966, he was cast opposite Mary Tyler Moore in the ill-fated Broadway musical Breakfast at Tiffany's, co-starring Priscilla Lopez, which, after an out-of-town tryout period, closed after only four previews. Decades later, he returned to Broadway in revivals of My Fair Lady and The Sound of Music.

At the end of the 1960s, Chamberlain spent a period of time in England, where he played in repertory theater and in the BBC's Portrait of a Lady (1968), becoming recognized as a serious actor. The following year, he starred opposite Katharine Hepburn in the film The Madwoman of Chaillot (1969). While in England, he took vocal coaching and in 1969 performed the title role in Hamlet for the Birmingham Repertory Theatre, becoming the first American to play the role there since John Barrymore in 1925. He received excellent notices and reprised the role for television in 1970 for the Hallmark Hall of Fame. A recording of the presentation was released by RCA Red Seal Records and was nominated for a Grammy Award.

In the 1970s, Chamberlain appeared in The Music Lovers (1970), Lady Caroline Lamb (playing Lord Byron; 1973), The Three Musketeers (1973) and its sequel The Four Musketeers (1974) playing Aramis, The Lady's Not for Burning (made for television, 1974), The Towering Inferno (1974), (in a villainous turn as a dishonest engineer), and The Count of Monte Cristo (1975). In The Slipper and the Rose (1976), a musical version of the Cinderella story, co-starring Gemma Craven, he displayed his vocal talents. A television film, William Bast's The Man in the Iron Mask (1977), followed. The same year, he starred in Peter Weir's film The Last Wave (1977).

Chamberlain later appeared in several popular television mini-series (earning him a nickname of "King of the Mini-Series"), including Centennial (1978–79), Shōgun (1980), and The Thorn Birds (1983), as Father Ralph de Bricassart with Rachel Ward and Barbara Stanwyck co-starring. In the 1980s, he appeared as leading man, playing Allan Quatermain in King Solomon's Mines (1985) and its sequel Lost City of Gold (1986), and played Jason Bourne/David Webb in the television film version of The Bourne Identity (1988), and reprised the role of Aramis in the last of the trilogy The Return of the Musketeers (1989).

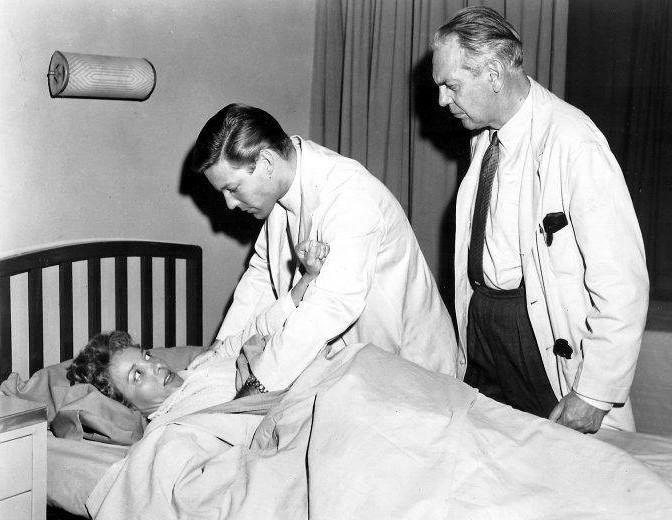
Beverly Garland, Richard Chamberlain and Raymond Massey in the first episode of Dr. Kildare (1961)

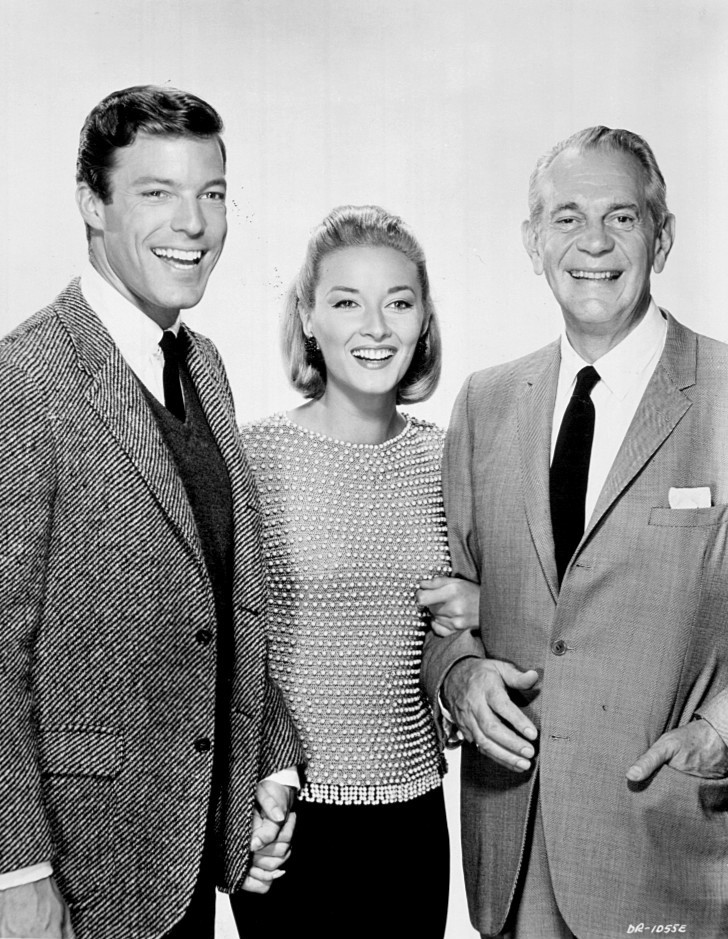
Richard Chamberlain (Dr. Kildare), Daniela Bianchi and Raymond Massey (Dr. Gillespie) from the television program Dr. Kildare in 1964

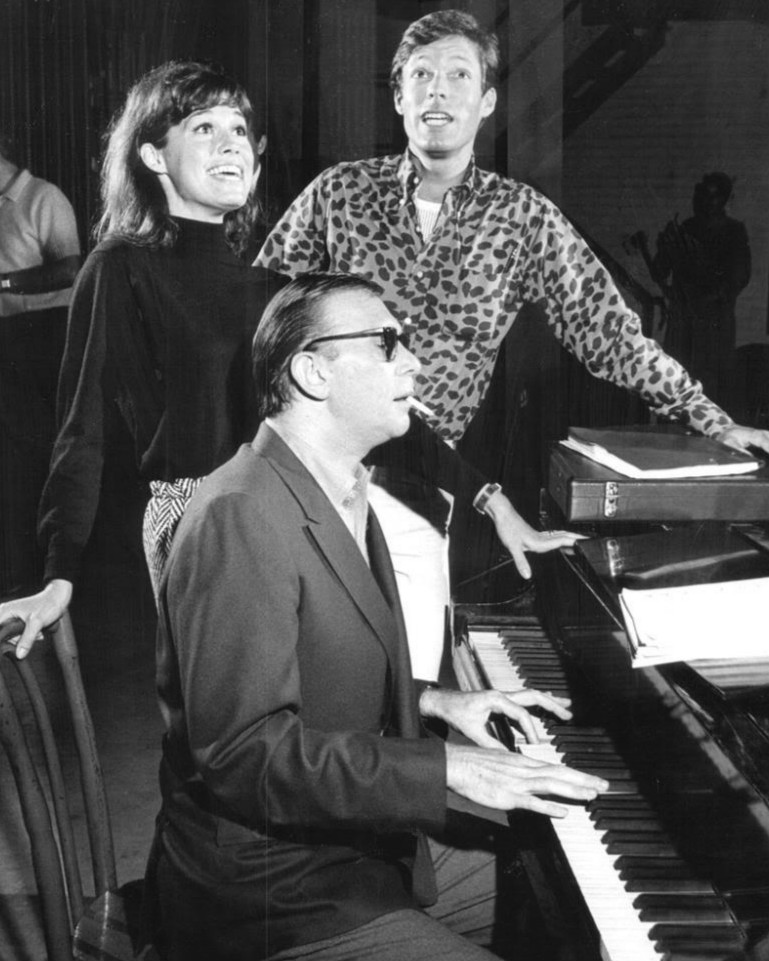
Chamberlain, Mary Tyler Moore, and Bob Merrill rehearsing Breakfast at Tiffany's in the mid-1960s

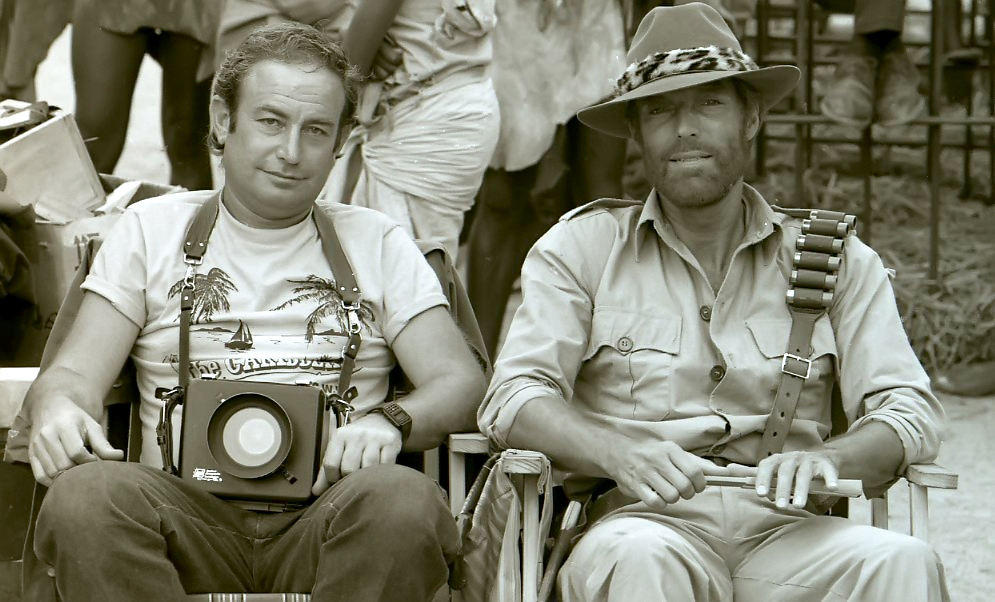
Chamberlain and photographer Yoni S. Hamenachem on the set of King Solomon's Mines in Zimbabwe

From the 1990s to his death in 2025, Chamberlain appeared mainly in television films, on stage, and as a guest star on such series as The Drew Carey Show and Will & Grace. in 1991, he appeared in a TV movie version of Davis Grubb's The Night of the Hunter that received mixed reviews. He starred as Henry Higgins in the 1993–94 Broadway revival of My Fair Lady. In 2005, Chamberlain appeared in the title role of Ebenezer Scrooge in the Broadway National Tour of Scrooge: The Musical. In 2006, he guest-starred in an episode of the British drama series Hustle, as well as season 4 of Nip/Tuck. In 2007, Chamberlain guest-starred as Glen Wingfield, Lynette Scavo's stepfather in episode 80 (Season 4, Episode 8, "Distant Past") of Desperate Housewives.

In 2008 and 2009, Chamberlain appeared as King Arthur in the national tour of Monty Python's Spamalot. In 2010 and 2012, he appeared as Archie Leach in season 3, episode 3 and season 4, episode 18 of the series Leverage, as well as two episodes of season 4 of Chuck where he played a villain known only as The Belgian. Chamberlain also appeared in several episodes of Brothers & Sisters, playing an old friend and love-interest of Saul's. He also appeared in the independent film We Are the Hartmans in 2011. In 2012, Chamberlain appeared on stage in the Pasadena Playhouse as Dr. Sloper in the play The Heiress.

In 2017, Chamberlain appeared in Twin Peaks: The Return as Bill Kennedy.

== Personal life and death ==
Chamberlain never married and had no children. To protect his privacy and his acting opportunities, he was not open about his homosexuality for most of his career. Chamberlain was outed as a gay man by the French women's magazine Nous Deux in 1989, but did not confirm he was gay until the publication of his 2003 autobiography Shattered Love: A Memoir.

Chamberlain was romantically involved with actor Wesley Eure in the 1970s.

In 1977, Chamberlain began a long-term relationship with actor and producer Martin Rabbett. Rabbett played the brother of Chamberlain's lead character in the 1986 film Allan Quatermain and the Lost City of Gold. They began living together in Hawaii in 1986 and had a private commitment ceremony. The couple separated amicably (but temporarily) in 2010, with Chamberlain moving to Los Angeles. In a 2014 interview, Chamberlain said that while he and Rabbett were not intimately involved, they remained close friends. According to Chamberlain's obituary in The New York Times, Rabbett and Chamberlain had resumed living together in Hawaii when he died. Rabbett was considered to be his "only immediate survivor".

Chamberlain died from a stroke on March 29, 2025, in Waimānalo, Hawaii, at the age of 90.

== Filmography ==
=== Film ===
| Year | Title | Role | Notes |
|---|---|---|---|
| 1960 | The Secret of the Purple Reef | Dean Christopher | |
| 1961 | A Thunder of Drums | Lieutenant Porter | |
| 1963 | Twilight of Honor | David Mitchell | |
| 1965 | Joy in the Morning | Carl Brown | |
| 1968 | Petulia | David Danner | |
| 1969 | The Madwoman of Chaillot | Roderick | |
| 1970 | Julius Caesar | Octavius | |
| 1971 | The Music Lovers | Pyotr Ilyich Tchaikovsky | |
| 1972 | Lady Caroline Lamb | Lord Byron | |
| 1973 | The Three Musketeers | Aramis | |
| 1974 | The Little Mermaid | Narrator (voice) | Short film |
| 1974 | The Towering Inferno | Roger Simmons | |
| 1974 | The Four Musketeers | Aramis | |
| 1975 | The Christmas Messenger | Christmas Messenger | Short film |
| 1975 | The Count of Monte Cristo | Edmond Dantès | |
| 1976 | The Slipper and the Rose | Prince Edward | |
| 1977 | The Last Wave | David Burton | |
| 1978 | The Swarm | Dr. Hubbard | |
| 1982 | Murder by Phone | Nat Bridger | |
| 1985 | King Solomon's Mines | Allan Quatermain | |
| 1986 | Allan Quatermain and the Lost City of Gold | Allan Quatermain | |
| 1989 | The Return of the Musketeers | Aramis | |
| 1995 | Bird of Prey | Jonathan Griffith | |
| 1997 | River Made to Drown In | Thaddeus MacKenzie | Direct-to-video |
| 1999 | The Pavilion | Huddlestone | Direct-to-video |
| 2007 | I Now Pronounce You Chuck & Larry | Councilman Banks | |
| 2007 | Strength and Honour | Denis O'Leary | |
| 2011 | The Perfect Family | Monsignor Murphy | |
| 2011 | We Are the Hartmans | Hartman | |
| 2015 | Justice League: Gods and Monsters | Highfather (voice) | Direct-to-video |
| 2018 | Nightmare Cinema | Dr. Mirari | |

=== Television ===
==== TV series ====
| Year | Title | Role | Notes |
|---|---|---|---|
| 1959 | Alfred Hitchcock Presents | Clay Pine | Episode: "Road Hog" |
| 1960 | Rescue 8 | —N/a | Episode: "High Explosive" |
| 1960 | Bourbon Street Beat | Dale Wellington | Episode: "Target of Hate" |
| 1960 | Gunsmoke | Pete | Episode: "The Bobsy Twins" |
| 1960 | Mr. Lucky | Alec | Episode: "Operation Fortuna" |
| 1960 | Thriller | Larry Carter | Episode: "The Watcher" |
| 1960 | Riverboat | Lieutenant Dave Winslow | Episode: "Chicota Landing" |
| 1961 | The Deputy | Jerry | Episode: "Edge of Doubt" |
| 1961 | Whispering Smith | Chris Harrington | Episode: "Stain of Justice" |
| 1961–66 | Dr. Kildare | Dr. James Kildare | Main cast |
| 1963 | The Eleventh Hour | Dr. James Kildare | Episode: "Four Feet in the Morning" |
| 1968 | The Portrait of a Lady | Ralph Touchett | Main cast |
| 1989–90 | Island Son | Dr. Daniel Kulani | Main cast |
| 2000 | Touched by an Angel | Everett / Jack Clay | Episode: "The Face on the Bar Room Floor" |
| 2002 | The Drew Carey Show | Maggie Wick | 2 episodes |
| 2005 | Will & Grace | Clyde | Episode: "Steams Like Old Times" |
| 2006 | Hustle | James Whittaker Wright III | Episode: "Whittaker Our Way Out" |
| 2006 | Nip/Tuck | Arthur Stiles | Episode: "Blu Mondae" |
| 2007 | Desperate Housewives | Glen Wingfield | Episode: "Distant Past" |
| 2010 | Chuck | Adelbert De Smet | 2 episodes |
| 2010–11 | Brothers & Sisters | Jonathan Byrold | Recurring role (season 5) |
| 2010–12 | Leverage | Archie Leach | 2 episodes |
| 2011 | ThunderCats | Zigg (voice) | Episode: "Forest of Magi Oar" |
| 2017 | Twin Peaks: The Return | Bill Kennedy | Episode: "Part Four" |

==== TV films and miniseries ====
| Year | Title | Role |
|---|---|---|
| 1972 | The Woman I Love | King Edward VIII |
| 1974 | The Lady's Not for Burning | Thomas Mendip |
| 1974 | F. Scott Fitzgerald and 'The Last of the Belles' | F. Scott Fitzgerald |
| 1978–79 | Centennial | Alexander McKeag |
| 1975 | The Count of Monte Cristo | Edmond Dantès |
| 1977 | The Man in the Iron Mask | Louis XIV / Philippe |
| 1978 | The Good Doctor | Anton Chekhov |
| 1980 | Shōgun | John Blackthorne |
| 1983 | Cook and Peary: The Race to the Pole | Frederick Cook |
| 1983 | The Thorn Birds | Ralph de Bricassart |
| 1985 | Wallenberg: A Hero's Story | Raoul Wallenberg |
| 1986 | Dream West | John C. Frémont |
| 1987 | Casanova | Giacomo Casanova |
| 1988 | The Bourne Identity | Jason Bourne |
| 1991 | Aftermath: A Test of Love | Ross Colburn |
| 1991 | Night of the Hunter | Harry Powell |
| 1993 | Ordeal in the Arctic | Captain John Couch |
| 1996 | The Thorn Birds: The Missing Years | Ralph de Bricassart |
| 1999 | Too Rich: The Secret Life of Doris Duke | Bernard Lafferty |
| 1997 | All the Winters That Have Been | Dane Corvin |
| 1997 | The Lost Daughter | Andrew McCracken |
| 2006 | Blackbeard | Governor Charles Eden |

== Stage credits (partial) ==
| Year | Title | Role | Venue | Notes | Ref. |
|---|---|---|---|---|---|
| 1966 | Breakfast at Tiffany's | Jeff Claypool | Majestic Theatre, New York | | |
| 1967 | West Side Story | Tony | US tour | | |
| 1969 | Hamlet | Prince Hamlet | Birmingham Repertory Theatre, Birmingham | | |
| 1971–72 | Richard II | Richard II of England | US tour | | |
| 1972 | The Lady's Not for Burning | Thomas Mendip | Chichester Festival Theatre, West Sussex | | |
| 1972 | The Fantasticks | El Gallo | Arlington Park Theater, Arlington Heights | | |
| 1973 | Cyrano de Bergerac | Cyrano de Bergerac | Ahmanson Theatre, Los Angeles | | |
| 1975–77 | The Night of the Iguana | The Reverend T. Lawrence Shannon | Ahmanson Theatre, Los Angeles | | |
| 1975–77 | The Night of the Iguana | The Reverend T. Lawrence Shannon | Circle in the Square Theatre, New York | | |
| 1978 | Father and Sons | Wild Bill Hickok | Public Theater, New York | | |
| 1980 | Arms and the Man | Sergius | Williamstown Theatre Festival, Williamstown | | |
| 1987 | Blithe Spirit | Charles Condomine | Morris A. Mechanic Theatre, Baltimore | | |
| 1987 | Blithe Spirit | Charles Condomine | Neil Simon Theatre, New York | | |
| 1993 | My Fair Lady | Professor Henry Higgins | US tour | | |
| 1993–94 | My Fair Lady | Professor Henry Higgins | Virginia Theatre, New York | | |
| 1999 | The Sound of Music | Georg von Trapp | Martin Beck Theater, New York | Replacement | |
| 1999–2000 | The Sound of Music | Georg von Trapp | US tour | | |
| 2000 | The Shadow of Greatness | Alan Perry | Berkshire Theatre Festival, Stockbridge | | |
| 2004–05 | Scrooge | Ebenezer Scrooge | US tour | | |
| 2009 | Spamalot | King Arthur | US tour | Replacement | |
| 2012 | The Heiress | Dr. Austin Sloper | Pasadena Playhouse, Pasadena | | |
| 2012 | The Exorcist | Father Lankester Merrin | Geffen Playhouse, Los Angeles | | |
| 2014 | Sticks and Bones | Father Donald | Pershing Square Signature Center, New York | | |

== Discography ==
From Richard Chamberlain Sings: UK No. 8, US No. 5
| Year | Title | Peak chart positions | | |
| Year | Title | US | UK | CAN |
|---|---|---|---|---|
| 1962 | "Theme from Dr. Kildare (Three Stars Will Shine Tonight)" | 10 | 12 | 4 |
| 1962 | "Love Me Tender" | 21 | 15 | 31 |
| 1963 | "All I Have to Do Is Dream" | 14 | — | 6 |
| 1963 | "Hi-Lili, Hi-Lo" | 64 | 20 | 6 |
| 1963 | "I Will Love You" | 65 | — | — |
| 1963 | "True Love" | 98 | 30 | — |

From Twilight of Honor
| Year | Title | US | UK | CAN |
|---|---|---|---|---|
| 1963 | "Blue Guitar" / "They Long to Be Close to You" | 42 | — | 30 |

From Richard Chamberlain (aka Joy in the Morning)
| Year | Title | US |
|---|---|---|
| 1964 | "Joy in the Morning" | — |
| 1964 | "Rome Will Never Leave You" | 99 |

Songs from The Slipper and the Rose (1976)
| Year | Title |
|---|---|
| 1976 | "Secret Kingdom" |
| 1976 | "He Danced With Me / She Danced with Me" |
| 1976 | "What a Comforting Thing to Know" |
| 1976 | "Why Can't I Be Two People?" |
| 1976 | "Bride-Finding Ball" |

From Haleakala: How Maui Snared The Sun/Clarinet Concerto

- "Haleakala: How Maui Snared The Sun (Tone Poem) (1991), composed by Dan Welcher, performed with the Honolulu Symphony"

== Awards and nominations ==
| Institution | Year | Category | Work | Results | Ref. |
|---|---|---|---|---|---|
| Aftonbladet TV Prize | 1985 | Best Foreign TV Personality – Male | —N/a | Won | |
| Australian Film Institute Awards | 1978 | Best Actor in a Leading Role | The Last Wave | Nominated | |
| Bravo Otto | 1985 | Best Male TV Star | —N/a | Won | |
| Drama Desk Awards | 1977 | Outstanding Actor in a Play | The Night of the Iguana | Nominated | |
| Drama Desk Awards | 1979 | Outstanding Actor in a Play | Fathers and Sons | Nominated | |
| Golden Apple Awards | 1962 | Most Cooperative Actor | —N/a | Won | |
| Golden Apple Awards | 1963 | Most Cooperative Actor | —N/a | Won | |
| Golden Apple Awards | 1980 | Male Star of the Year | —N/a | Won | |
| Golden Globe Awards | 1962 | Best Television Star – Male | Dr. Kildare | Won | |
| Golden Globe Awards | 1979 | Best Actor in a Television Series – Drama | Centennial | Nominated | |
| Golden Globe Awards | 1980 | Best Actor in a Television Series – Drama | Shōgun | Won | |
| Golden Globe Awards | 1983 | Best Actor in a Miniseries or Motion Picture Made for Television | The Thorn Birds | Won | |
| Golden Globe Awards | 1985 | Best Actor in a Miniseries or Motion Picture Made for Television | Wallenberg: A Hero's Story | Nominated | |
| Golden Globe Awards | 1988 | Best Actor in a Miniseries or Motion Picture Made for Television | The Bourne Identity | Nominated | |
| Grammy Awards | 1971 | Best Spoken Word Recording | Hamlet | Nominated | |
| Hawaii International Film Festival | 2012 | EuroCinema Hawai'i Lifetime Achievement Award | —N/a | Won | |
| Online Film & Television Association Awards | 2023 | Television Hall of Fame: Actors | —N/a | Inducted | |
| Primetime Emmy Awards | 1975 | Outstanding Lead Actor in a Special Program – Drama or Comedy | The Count of Monte Cristo | Nominated | |
| Primetime Emmy Awards | 1981 | Outstanding Lead Actor in a Limited Series or a Special | Shōgun | Nominated | |
| Primetime Emmy Awards | 1983 | Outstanding Lead Actor in a Limited Series or a Special | The Thorn Birds | Nominated | |
| Primetime Emmy Awards | 1985 | Outstanding Lead Actor in a Limited Series or a Special | Wallenberg: A Hero's Story | Nominated | |
| Sitges Film Festival | 1982 | Best Actor | The Last Wave | Won | |
| Steiger Awards | 2011 | Lifetime Achievement Award | —N/a | Won | |
| TV Land Awards | 2003 | Classic TV Doctor of the Year | Dr. Kildare | Nominated | |

== Published works ==
- Chamberlain, Richard (June 3, 2003). Shattered Love: A Memoir. New York: Regan Books. ISBN 0-06-008743-9. OCLC 52178565.
