= Theme from Dr. Kildare (Three Stars Will Shine Tonight) =

"Theme From Dr. Kildare (Three Stars Will Shine Tonight)"

Single by Richard Chamberlain

from the album Richard Chamberlain Sings
- B-side: "A Kiss to Build a Dream On"
- Released: 1962
- Length: 2:41
- Label: MGM
- Songwriter(s): Jerry Goldsmith, Pete Rugolo, Hal Winn

Richard Chamberlain singles chronology
"Theme From Dr. Kildare (Three Stars Will Shine Tonight)" (1962)	"Love Me Tender" (1962)

"Theme From Dr. Kildare (Three Stars Will Shine Tonight)" is a song written by Jerry Goldsmith and Pete Rugolo with lyrics by Hal Winn. The song was the theme for the television series Dr. Kildare. The series' lead actor, Richard Chamberlain, released it in 1962 as a single in his first venture into a singing career.

The single was a success in the charts, becoming a No. 10 hit on the Billboard Hot 100, and No. 12 on the UK Singles Chart.

== Charts ==
Chart (1962)	Peak position
Canada (CHUM Hit Parade)	4
UK Singles (OCC)	12
US Billboard Hot 100	10
US Easy Listening (Billboard)	4
US Cash Box Top 100	13

== Other versions ==
An instrumental version by Johnnie Spence reached No. 15 on the UK chart.
