= Aura Lea =

American Civil War song

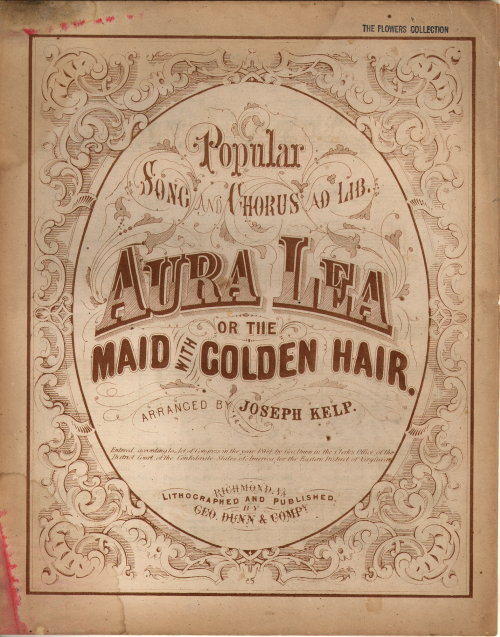
- Cover of Confederate version (1864)

Song
- Language: English
- Published: 1861 by John Church Company
- Genre: sentimental ballad
- Composer: George R. Poulton
- Lyricist: W. W. Fosdick

"Aura Lea" (sometimes spelled "Aura Lee") is an American Civil War song about a maiden. It was written by W. W. Fosdick (lyrics) and George R. Poulton (music). The melody was used in Elvis Presley's 1956 hit song "Love Me Tender".

== History ==
Aura Lea was published by Poulton, an Englishman who had come to the USA with his family as a boy in 1838, and Fosdick in 1861. It was a sentimental ballad at a time when upbeat and cheerful songs were more popular in the music halls. It became popular as a minstrel song, and the tune was also taken up by the U.S. Military Academy as a graduating class song, called "Army Blue"; new lyrics by L. W. Becklaw were sung to the original melody.

The Civil War began shortly after the song's release; "Aura Lea" was adopted by soldiers on both sides, and was often sung around campfires.

The tune is familiar to modern audiences from the 1956 Elvis Presley #1 hit "Love Me Tender" with new lyrics by Ken Darby, a derivative adaptation of the original. A later Presley recording for the film The Trouble with Girls entitled "Violet (Flower of N.Y.U.)" also used the melody of "Aura Lea".

== Lyrics ==
The lyrics as written by Fosdick:

When the blackbird in the Spring,
On the willow tree,
Sat and rock'd, I heard him sing,
Singing Aura Lea.
Aura Lea, Aura Lea,
Maid of golden hair;
Sunshine came along with thee,
And swallows in the air.
Chorus:
Aura Lea, Aura Lea,
Maid of golden hair;
Sunshine came along with thee,
And swallows in the air.

In thy blush the rose was born,
Music, when you spake,
Through thine azure eye the morn,
Sparkling seemed to break.
Aura Lea, Aura Lea,
Birds of crimson wing,
Never song have sung to me,
As in that sweet spring.
(Chorus)

Aura Lea! the bird may flee,
The willow's golden hair
Swing through winter fitfully,
On the stormy air.
Yet if thy blue eyes I see,
Gloom will soon depart;
For to me, sweet Aura Lea
Is sunshine through the heart.
(Chorus)

When the mistletoe was green,
Midst the winter's snows,
Sunshine in thy face was seen,
Kissing lips of rose.
Aura Lea, Aura Lea,
Take my golden ring;
Love and light return with thee,
And swallows with the spring.
(Chorus)

== In popular culture ==
- "Aura Lee" was sung by Frances Farmer and a male chorus in the 1936 film Come and Get It, based on Edna Ferber's novel.
- It is the running theme music in the background of the 1954 John Ford film The Long Gray Line.
- Satirist Tom Lehrer adapted Aura Lea's melody, frequently performed by college acapella groups such as The Whiffenpoofs, for his 1959 song Bright College Days.
