= All I Have to Do Is Dream =

1958 song by Felice and Boudleaux Bryant

Single by the Everly Brothers
- B-side: "Claudette"
- Published: April 21, 1958, Acuff-Rose Publications
- Released: April 1958
- Recorded: March 6, 1958
- Studio: RCA Studios, Nashville
- Genre: Jangle pop; rock and roll
- Length: 2:20
- Label: Cadence 1348
- Songwriter: Felice and Boudleaux Bryant
- Producer: Archie Bleyer

The Everly Brothers singles chronology
"This Little Girl of Mine" (1958)	"All I Have to Do Is Dream" (1958)	"Bird Dog" (1958)

"All I Have to Do Is Dream" is a 1958 song by husband-and-wife songwriting duo Felice and Boudleaux Bryant and made popular by the Everly Brothers. The song is ranked number 141 on the Rolling Stone magazine's list of the 500 Greatest Songs of All Time and is in AABA form.

== The Everly Brothers' original version ==
The best-known version was recorded by the Everly Brothers at RCA Studios Nashville and released as a single in April 1958. It was recorded by them in only two live takes on March 6, 1958, and features Chet Atkins on guitar. It was the only single to reach number one on all of the Billboard singles charts simultaneously. On May 12, 1958, it became number one on the "Best Sellers in Stores" chart, then it reached number one on the "Most played by Jockeys" and "Top 100" charts on May 19, 1958, and remained at the top on each chart for four, five, and three weeks, respectively. With the August 1958 introduction of the Billboard Hot 100 chart, the song ended the year at number two. "All I Have to Do Is Dream" also hit number one on the rhythm and blues chart, and became the Everly Brothers' third chart topper on the country chart. The Everly Brothers briefly returned to the Hot 100 in 1961 with this song.

Outside the United States, "All I Have to Do Is Dream" had massive success in various countries, most notably the United Kingdom, where it topped the UK's New Musical Express chart in June 1958 and remained there for seven weeks (including one week as a joint number one with Vic Damone's "On the Street Where You Live"), spending 21 weeks on the chart in Britain. The song has also featured on several notable lists of the best songs or singles of all time, including British music magazine Q's 1001 best songs ever in 2003.

It was named one of the "500 Songs that Shaped Rock and Roll" by the Rock and Roll Hall of Fame and received the Grammy Hall of Fame Award in 2004.

The B-side, "Claudette", was the first major song-writing success for Roy Orbison (who also recorded his own version of the song) and was named after his first wife. As a result of this success, Orbison terminated his contract with Sun Records and affiliated himself with the Everly's publisher, Acuff-Rose Music.

=== Personnel ===
- Don Everly – lead vocals and acoustic guitar
- Phil Everly – lead vocals and acoustic guitar
- Chet Atkins – electric guitar
- Floyd Chance – upright bass

== Certifications ==
Certification for "All I Have to Do Is Dream"
Region	Certification	Certified units/sales
New Zealand (RMNZ)	Gold	15,000^{‡}
United Kingdom (BPI)	Silver	200,000^{‡}
^{‡} Sales+streaming figures based on certification alone.

== Cover versions ==
"All I Have to Do Is Dream"

Single by Richard Chamberlain

from the album Richard Chamberlain Sings
- B-side: "Hi-Lili, Hi-Lo"
- Released: 1963
- Length: 2:30
- Label: MGM
- Songwriter: Felice Bryant and Boudleaux Bryant

Richard Chamberlain singles chronology
"Love Me Tender" (1962)	"All I Have to Do Is Dream" (1963)	"I Will Love You / True Love" (1963)

Richard Chamberlain covered the song on his 1962 album Richard Chamberlain Sings. Released as a single in 1963, it peaked at number 14 on the Billboard Hot 100 chart, and number six on Billboard's Middle-Road Singles chart. In Canada, it reached number six.

Roy Orbison covered the song on his 1963 album In Dreams.

French singer Sheila recorded a French cover version entitled "Pendant les vacances", a hit in France in 1963.

Bobbie Gentry and Glen Campbell released a duet version in 1969. Their version reached number 27 on the Billboard Hot 100, number six on Billboard's Hot Country Singles chart, number four on Billboard's Easy Listening chart, No. 3 on the UK Singles Chart, No. 6 in Sweden (Radio Sweden), and number three in South Africa (Springbok Radio). In Canada, their version was number two on the country charts, number three on the AC charts, and number 29 on the pop charts.

The Nitty Gritty Dirt Band's version, from their 1975 album Symphonion Dream, reached number 66 on the Billboard Hot 100, number 30 on Billboard's Easy Listening chart, and number 79 on Billboard's Hot Country Singles chart. In Canada on RPM, it reached number 81.

Andy Gibb and Victoria Principal peaked at number 51 on the Billboard Hot 100 in 1981 with their remake. In Canada, their version reached number eight on the AC chart and number 29 on the pop chart.

R.E.M. contributed their rendition titled "Dream (All I Have to Do)" to the Athens, GA: Inside/Out soundtrack in 1987.

British singer Cliff Richard, singing with Phil Everly, recorded a version of the song that peaked at number 14 on the UK singles chart in 1994.

Brandi Carlile performed the song at the 2021 Rock and Roll Hall of Fame induction ceremony.
