= Julia Drake Fosdick Dean =

- Born: 1800; England
- Died: November 1832 (aged 31–32); Dutchess County
- Occupation: Actor
- Spouse(s): Thomas R. Fosdick, Edwin Dean
- Children: Julia Dean, W. W. Fosdick
- Parent(s): Samuel Drake; Alexina Fisher Drake

Julia Drake Fosdick Dean (1800 – November 1832) was an early American actress.

She was born in 1800 in England, one of five children of Samuel Drake and Alexina Fisher Drake. The Drake family emigrated to the United States in 1810 and the entire family began appearing on stage in New York City and Boston. After Alexina's death in 1814, the Drake family formed an itinerant theater company, travelling by wagon and raft through the frontier areas between towns and cities along the Mississippi, Ohio, and Allegheny rivers. A member of the company, Noah Ludlow, later described Julia Drake as "the bright particular star of her family". She became known for roles including Lady Teazle in The School for Scandal by Richard Brinsley Sheridan, Lady Rackett in Three Weeks After Marriage by Arthur Murphy, and the Widow Cheerly in The Soldier's Daughter by Andrew Cherry.

Drake retired from the stage after she married Cincinnati merchant and banker Thomas Fosdick. They had two children, Mary Fosdick and William Fosdick, a lawyer, poet, and lyricist. After Thomas Fosdick's death in 1829, she returned to the stage and later married actor Edwin Dean. They had two children, Helen Dean and Julia Dean, who became an even more prominent actress herself.

Julia Drake Fosdick Dean died in November 1832 in Dutchess County, New York.
