= Hi-Lili, Hi-Lo =

Single by Richard Chamberlain

from the album Richard Chamberlain Sings
- B-side: "All I Have to Do Is Dream"
- Released: 1963
- Length: 2:41
- Label: MGM
- Songwriters: Helen Deutsch, Bronisław Kaper

Richard Chamberlain singles chronology
"Love Me Tender" (1962)	"All I Have to Do Is Dream" / "Hi-Lili, Hi-Lo" (1963)	"I Will Love You" / "True Love" (1963)

"Hi-Lili, Hi-Lo" is a popular song with music by Bronislaw Kaper, and lyrics by Helen Deutsch. The song was published in 1952. The song was featured in the 1953 film Lili, starring Leslie Caron.

== Recorded versions ==
- Dinah Shore with Frank De Vol's orchestra and chorus. Recorded in Hollywood on August 18, 1952. It was released by RCA Victor Records as catalog number 20-4992 (in USA) and by EMI on the His Master's Voice label as catalog number B 10385.
- Shari Lewis (1952)
- Eve Boswell (1953)
- Leslie Caron and Mel Ferrer (1953)
- Marilú in Spanish for Peerless Records (1953)
- Perry Como, live on his TV show (1953)
- pt:Trio Madrigal First recorded version in Portuguese on YouTube (written by pt:Haroldo Barbosa (November 1953)
- pt:Neide Fraga Second recorded version in Portuguese on YouTube (December 1953)
- Dick Hyman Trio (1956)
- Roger Williams (1956)
- Annunzio Paolo Mantovani - instrumental version on the album Film encores (1957)
- Linda Lawson on the album Introducing Linda Lawson (1960)
- The Everly Brothers (1961)
- Chet Atkins (1961)
- Shelley Fabares on the album Shelley! (1962)
- The Four Seasons (1962)
- Etta Jones on the album Love Shout (1962)
- John Williams piano arrangement on the album André Previn in Hollywood (1963)
- Slim Whitman (1963)
- Nat King Cole (1963)
- Johnny Mathis (1963)
- Eydie Gorme
- The Four Aces
- Richard Chamberlain (1963, number 20 UK, number 64 U.S., number 18 U.S. AC, number 6 CAN)
- Joni James
- Sergio Franchi on the album Women in My Life (1964)
- Teresa Brewer (1964)
- Bobby Goldsboro (1964)
- Ray Conniff (1965)
- The Lennon Sisters (1965)
- Paul Desmond on the album Glad to Be Unhappy (1965)
- Paul Horn on the album Cycle (1965)
- Manfred Mann on the album Mann Made (1965)
- Alan Price Set, on the album The Price to Play The Alan Price Set (1966)
- Shelby Flint (1966)
- Gene Vincent (1967)
- Shorty Long (1967)
- Jimmy Durante
- Tim Buckley on the album Dream Letter: Live in London 1968 (1968)
- Jim Nabors (1970)
- Bill Evans on the album Intuition (1974)
- John Farnham on the album Johnny Farnham Sings Hits from the Movies (1974)
- Anne Murray on the album There's a Hippo in My Tub (1977)
- Nalva Aguiar in Portuguese on the album Vala Pataedo
- Dream Express (1979)
- Gal Costa recorded live in Portuguese with the unique Brazilian touch on YouTube (1984)
- Rickie Lee Jones on the album Pop Pop (1991)
- Betty Buckley (1996)
