= I Will Love You =

Single by Richard Chamberlain

from the album Richard Chamberlain Sings
- B-side: "True Love"
- Released: 1963
- Label: MGM
- Songwriter(s): Shelby Flint, Barry DeVorzon

Richard Chamberlain singles chronology
"All I Have to Do Is Dream" / Hi-Lili, Hi-Lo" (1963)	"I Will Love You" / "True Love" (1963)	"Blue Guitar" (1963)

"I Will Love You" is a song written by Shelby Flint and Barry DeVorzon. Flint recorded it as a track for her eponymous debut album in 1961.

== Notable covers ==
In 1962, The Lettermen released their version of the song on their album Jim, Tony, and Bob.

In 1963, Richard Chamberlain released his version as a single from his 1962 album Richard Chamberlain Sings, reaching No. 65 on the Billboard Hot 100.
