= Come and Get It (novel) =

1935 novel by Edna Ferber

- First edition cover (Doubleday, Doran)
- Author: Edna Ferber
- Publisher: Doubleday, Doran
- Publication date: 1935

Come and Get It is a 1935 novel by American author Edna Ferber. A film version with the same title was produced in 1936.

In the novel, an ambitious lumberjack abandons his saloon girl lover so that he can marry into wealth, but years later becomes infatuated with the woman's daughter.

Come and Get It was a New York Times bestseller and was favorably reviewed in Kirkus Reviews.

The 1936 film adaptation, produced by Samuel Goldwyn, received two Academy Award nominations for Best Film Editing and Best Supporting Actor (Walter Brennan). Brennan won the latter award, becoming the first winner of that category.
