= Blue Guitar =

Single by Richard Chamberlain

from the album Twilight of Honor
- B-side: "(They Long to Be) Close to You"
- Released: 1963
- Length: 2:51
- Label: MGM
- Songwriter(s): Burt Bacharach, Hal David

Richard Chamberlain singles chronology
"I Will Love You" (1963)	"Blue Guitar" (1963)	"Rome Will Never Leave You" (1964)

"Blue Guitar" is a song written by Burt Bacharach and Hal David. In 1963, Richard Chamberlain released it as the lead single from his album Twilight of Honor. It was a No. 12 hit on the Easy Listening chart, No. 42 on the Billboard Hot 100, and No. 30 in Canada.

== Background ==
The B-side of Chamberlain's single is the first recording of the Bacharach-David composition "(They Long to Be) Close to You." The song later became a number-one hit for the Carpenters in 1970.
