= Wellington Guernsey =

Wellington Guernsey (correct name: William Greville Hudson Guernsey) (8 June 1817 – 13 November 1885) was an Irish composer, poet, and military man.

== Biography ==
Guernsey was born in Mullingar, Co. Westmeath, studied briefly as a boy with the well-known Italian opera composer Saverio Mercadante at Lisbon during 1827–8, returning to Ireland probably during the early 1830s to work in Cork and Dublin. Of his early career a newspaper correspondent wrote in 1858: "Mr Wellington Guernsey [...] was, I believe, born in Ireland, his father having been master of a military band, and was formerly in the employment of Messrs. Robinson and Bussell, music-sellers, Westmoreland Street. He had previously been employed in the shop of Mr. Boden, music-seller, Cork. Guernsey was dismissed from Messrs. Robinson and Bussell's under suspicious circumstances, and he then set up a music establishment for himself. His house in Nassau Street was unfortunately burned, and being insured, the company at first refused to pay the full amount of insurance, but a compromise for one-half the sum was accepted by Mr. Guernsey. The gentleman then proceeded to London, where he married an actress, and figured very speedily at the police-office, for maltreating his wife. He subsequently obtained, during the Crimean war, a majority in the Turkish Contingent, from which he was removed by General Vivian for gross misconduct. He has since been hanging about the theatres in London, gaining a livelihood composing waltzes, &c., which were very popular, and which were constantly performed by her Majesty's private band." From 1843 he lived mainly in England, but for a few years he appears to have returned to Ireland to organise concerts at the Rotunda. In 1847 he became musical director of the Olympic Theatre in London, but by the early 1850s he must have embarked on his military career which took him to Turkey in 1855, the Crimea in 1856 and to Paraguay and Brazil in 1857. In 1858 he was incriminated for stealing documents from the Colonial Office, which ended his military career.

Guernsey's worklist is divided into a time before and after his military time. His greatest successes were songs, piano quadrilles and marches written between 1845 and 1851. The best-known pieces were the songs She Gathers a Shamrock (1845), I'll Hang my Harp on a Willow Tree (1846) and Dinah Blake (1847). He also contributed the words to George Barker's song Mary Blane (1846). After his dismissal from the army he returned to music, and quickly drew on his earlier successes. An 1860 newspaper article noted: "A few months back Wellington Guernsey's celebrated song of 'I'll Hang my Harp on a Willow Tree,' was re-assigned to the publishers for £100; so that, who will say that old songs are not worth money, when, after so many years being published, they fetch the above fabulous prices." Similarly, another song for which he wrote the words only (and Joseph Ascher the music) called Alice, Where Art Thou? (1861) became extremely successful, which is recounted in an 1885 obituary: "Mr. Guernsey's most successful song 'Alice, where art thou?' had a curious career, the composer offered it without success to nearly all the leading publishers for a £5 note. At last Messrs Duncan, Davidson & Co. published it on sharing terms, when the sale reached nearly 300,000 copies, and it even now affords an income." Alice, where art thou? even made it into the Oxford Dictionary of Quotations. The music Guernsey composed after 1860 did not become as successful as his poetry. He stopped composing piano galops and waltzes by 1862, and some of his Ireland-inspired songs like The Boatman of Kinsale (1865) and The Green Moss (1869) did not fetch the same public attention as his pre-1850 music.

He also translated two books by François-Joseph Fétis into English, the Manuel des compositeurs (Paris, 1837) as A Manual for Composers (London, c.1850) and the Notice biographique sur Nicolò Paganini (Paris, 1851) as Biographical Notice of Nicolò Paganini (London, 1852). Guernsey died in London.

== Selected compositions ==
(all published in London by Prowse, Boosey, Duncan Davison, etc.)

Chamber music

- The Coral Cave Polka for cornet, flute, and piano (c.1860)

Piano music

- Casilda Quadrilles (1830)
- The Olympic Polka (1848)
- The Glasgow Quadrilles (c.1850)
- The Koh-i-noor Diamond, or Mountain of Light Quadrille (1851)
- Bouquet des mélodies anglaises (1854)
- The Lough Erne Waltzes (1859)
- The Gorilla Galop (1861)
- The Adelina Patti Galop (1862)

Songs

- Old Songs of Old Ireland, collection (1843)
- Dance Away, We'll be Gay (1845)
- She Gathers a Shamrock (1845)
- I'll Hang my Harp on a Willow Tree (1846)
- Dinah Blake (1847)
- I was Dreaming of Thee, Darling Katty (1849)
- The Songs of Ireland, collection (c.1860)
- The Boatman of Kinsale (1865)
- The Wearing of the Green (1866)
- The Green Moss (1869)
- The Hindoo Widow (1870)
- God Upon the Ocean (1874)
- Dear Land of my Fathers (1884)
- The Abbess of the Rhine (1885)
