= Francisco Cimadevilla González =

Spanish composer

- Born: 10 May 1861; Valladolid, Spain
- Died: 19 August 1931 (aged 70); Madrid, Spain
- Occupation(s): Guitarist, composer

Francisco Cimadevilla González (10 May 1861 Valladolid – 19 August 1931 Madrid (Note: The two sources authored by Domingo Prat and Daniel Fortea have the same date of death of Francisco Cimadevilla González, but his date of birth differs. Prat's source gives it as 10 May 1861, while Fortea's source gives it as 1 May 1861.)) was a Spanish guitarist and composer. He was a contemporary of Francisco Tárrega. Cimadevilla mainly transcribed and arranged several well-known guitar pieces, also composing a small number of lounge music and folk music.

== Legacy ==
- His prominent students were Felicidad Rodríguez Serrano, Miguel de la Mano, and Miguel Iruela.
- The flamenco works by him and Julián Arcas mildly influenced Manuel de Falla's compositional style.
