= Joseph Ascher =

Dutch-Jewish composer and pianist

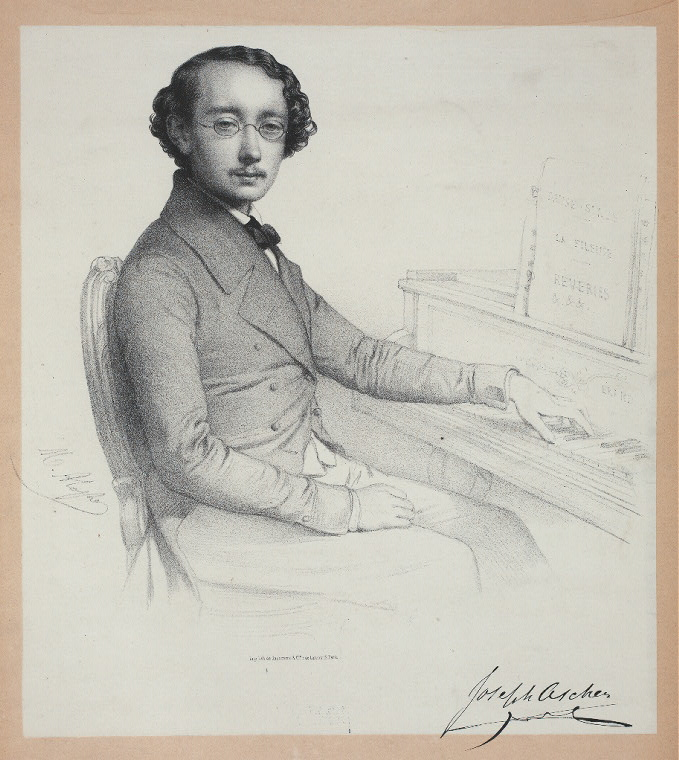
Portrait of Joseph Ascher

Joseph Simon Ascher (3 June 1829 – 20 June 1869) was a Dutch-Jewish composer and pianist. He lived in Paris and London for most of his life.

== Life ==
Ascher was born in Groningen, the son of the chazzan of the city, who went on to become a cantor in London. He started his musical studies in London and continued them at the Leipzig Conservatory with Ignaz Moscheles as his teacher, but did not graduate. He died at age 40.

His pianistic gifts were recognized by the Empress Eugénie of France, who asked him to become her court pianist in 1849. In 1865, Ascher moved back to London, while in Paris he was succeeded as court pianist by Émile Waldteufel. He died in London from the result of what some 19th-century sources call "a dissolute life". Brown (1886) regarded him as a "composer who, had he been more careful in his worldly relations, might have proved one of the greatest among recent musicians."

== Music ==
Ascher composed about 170 works for piano, piano four- and eight-hands, as well as ballads and display pieces for solo singers with piano accompaniment. Brown (1886) wrote: "his music is more than commonplace, and many of his single pieces evince genius of a decidedly original turn. The numerous pieces which he has produced for the Pf. [NB.: the piano] are in general brilliant and effective in character; while several of them show tokens of real genius inspiration."

== Selected works ==
Piano

- Les Hirondelles op. 15, 1852
- Thème russe op. 16, c. 1852
- L'Orgie op. 21, 1854
- Le Papillon op. 32, 1854
- Styrienne op. 35, 1854
- Fanfare militaire en forme de marche op. 40, 1854
- Prière op. 42, 1855
- Dans ma barque op. 47, 1856
- Les Clochettes op. 48, 1856
- La Sevillana op. 51, 1856
- La Sylphide op. 57, 1857
- Feuilles et fleurs op. 59, 1857
- La Zingara op. 73, 1858
- La Cascade de roses op. 80, 1858
- Mon Enfant dort. Berceuse op. 88, 1860
- Le Phalène op. 93, 1860
- La Ronde des elfes op. 104, 1862
- La Cloche du couvent op. 106, 1861
- I Lazzaroni op. 112, 1863
- Paraphrase de concert sur l'air irlandais 'The Last Rose of Summer' op. 114, 1863
- Les Sylphes des bois op. 119, 1865
- Vision op. 120, 1865

Songs

- Alice, Where Art Thou? (Wellington Guernsey), 1861
- I'll think of thee (Wellington Guernsey), 1862
- Thoughts of Home. An Alpine Song (Wellington Guernsey), 1864
- A Twilight Dream (George Linley), 1866
- Bygone Love (George Linley), 1866
- Mélanie (Maggioni), 1870

== Family ==
His elder sister, Gertrude Ascher (c.1822–1893), was the mother of Benjamin Fink (1847–1893), a Melbourne-based investor, financier, land and property speculator, and politician. Fink's ability as a pianist, gave him his start in business, first selling Schwechten pianos, then becoming a major furniture retailer.
