= Alice, Where Art Thou? =

1861 song

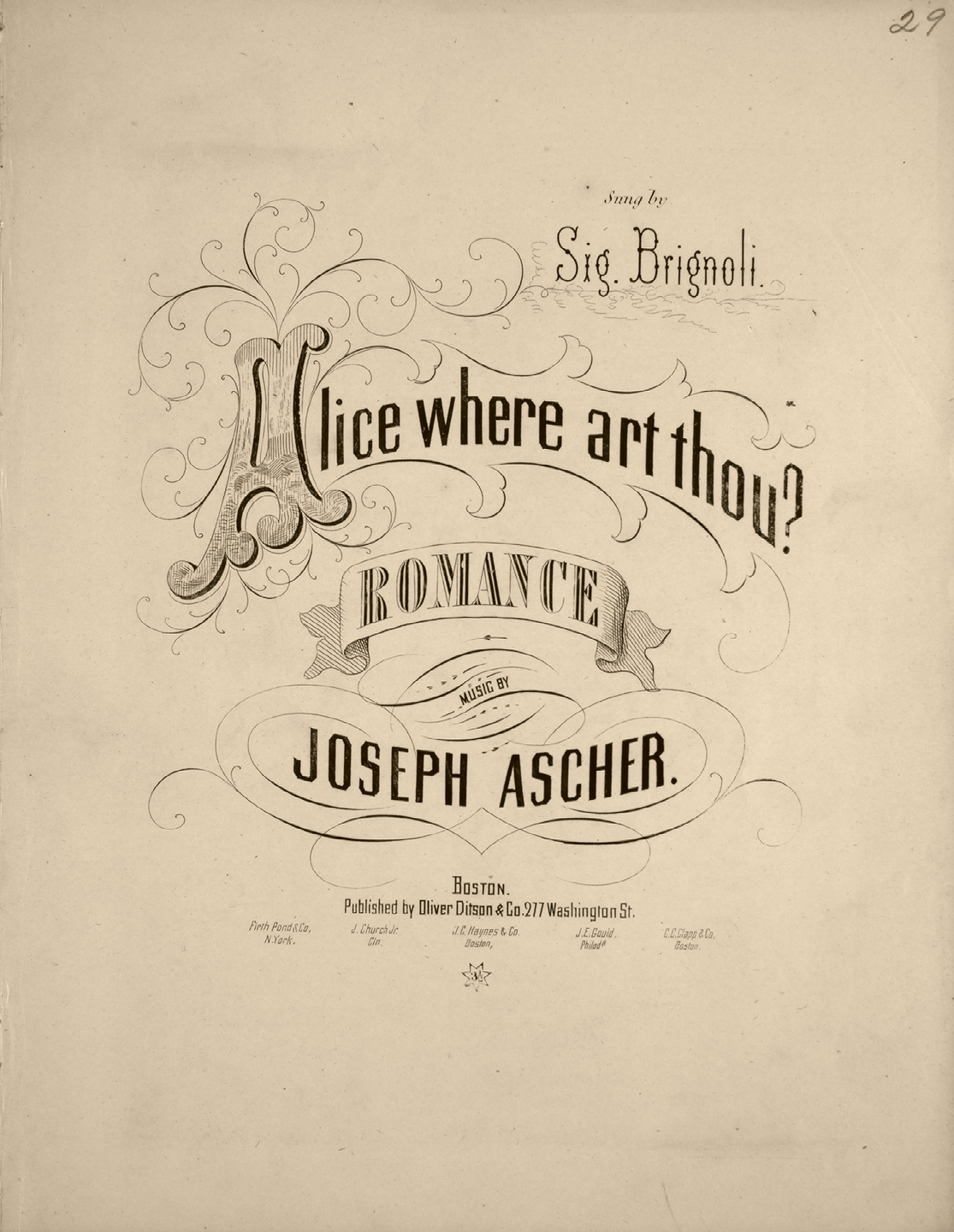

Song
- Released: 1861
- Songwriter: Wellington Guernsey
- Composer: Joseph Ascher

Alice, Where Art Thou? is a popular British parlour song of the Victorian era. It was composed by Joseph Ascher. The text was by Wellington Guernsey, although it is sometimes attributed to Alfred Bunn, who is best known for "I Dreamt I Dwelt in Marble Halls". It became a popular song, selling many copies of sheet music and featuring regularly as a standard in the music halls.

== Usage ==
Recording by the Victor String Quartet, 1908

The phrase passed into popular usage for many decades.

In the 1954 British film Svengali, it is heard several times as the song Trilby O'Ferrall sings badly before she is mesmerised by the title character into performing as a brilliant opera singer. The 1980s British television series Open All Hours features a brass band version of the tune as its title music.

A slightly different version of the song was sung by the main characters in the episode "Alice, Whose Art Thou?", of the television series Leave it to Charlie.

== Bibliography ==
- Roy Newsome: Brass Roots: A Hundred Years of Brass Bands and Their Music, 1836-1936 (London: Routledge, 2019).
- Eric Partridge: A Dictionary of Catch Phrases (London: Routledge, 2003).
