= Thomas Whitney Surette =

American musician, composer, and educator (1862–1941)

- Born: September 7, 1862; Concord, Massachusetts
- Died: May 19, 1941 (aged 78); Concord, Massachusetts

Thomas Whitney Surette (September 7, 1862 – May 19, 1941) was an American musician, composer and teacher.

== Early life ==
Born in Concord, Massachusetts, the son of Louis Athanase Surette, an Acadian commission merchant from Nova Scotia, and Frances Jane Shattuck.

== Career ==
Surette studied piano with Arthur Foote and composition with John Knowles Paine at Harvard University from 1889 to 1892, but failed to obtain a degree. In 1907, he was appointed music reader at Columbia University. In 1915, he founded Concord Summer School of Music, which operated until 1938. In 1921, he was appointed Director of Music at Bryn Mawr College.

Surette published the following: The Appreciation of Music (with D.G. Mason; 5 vols., of which vols. 2 and 5 were by Mason alone; N.Y., 1907; innumerable subsequent printings), and, on a more elevated plane, Course of Study on the Development of Symphonic Music (Chicago, 1915) and Music and Life (Boston, 1917); He wrote two light operas: "Priscilla, or The Pilgrim’s Proxy", after Longfellow (Concord, March 6, 1889; which had more than 1,000 subsequent performances in the US), and "The Eve of Saint Agnes" (1897), as well as a romantic opera, "Cascabel, or The Broken Tryst"(Pittsburgh, May 15, 1899).

Surette was also largely responsible for the vogue of music appreciation courses that swept the country and spilled over into the British Isles.

== Personal life ==
He married Ada Elizabeth Miles on June 20, 1899.
