= Hermann Berens =

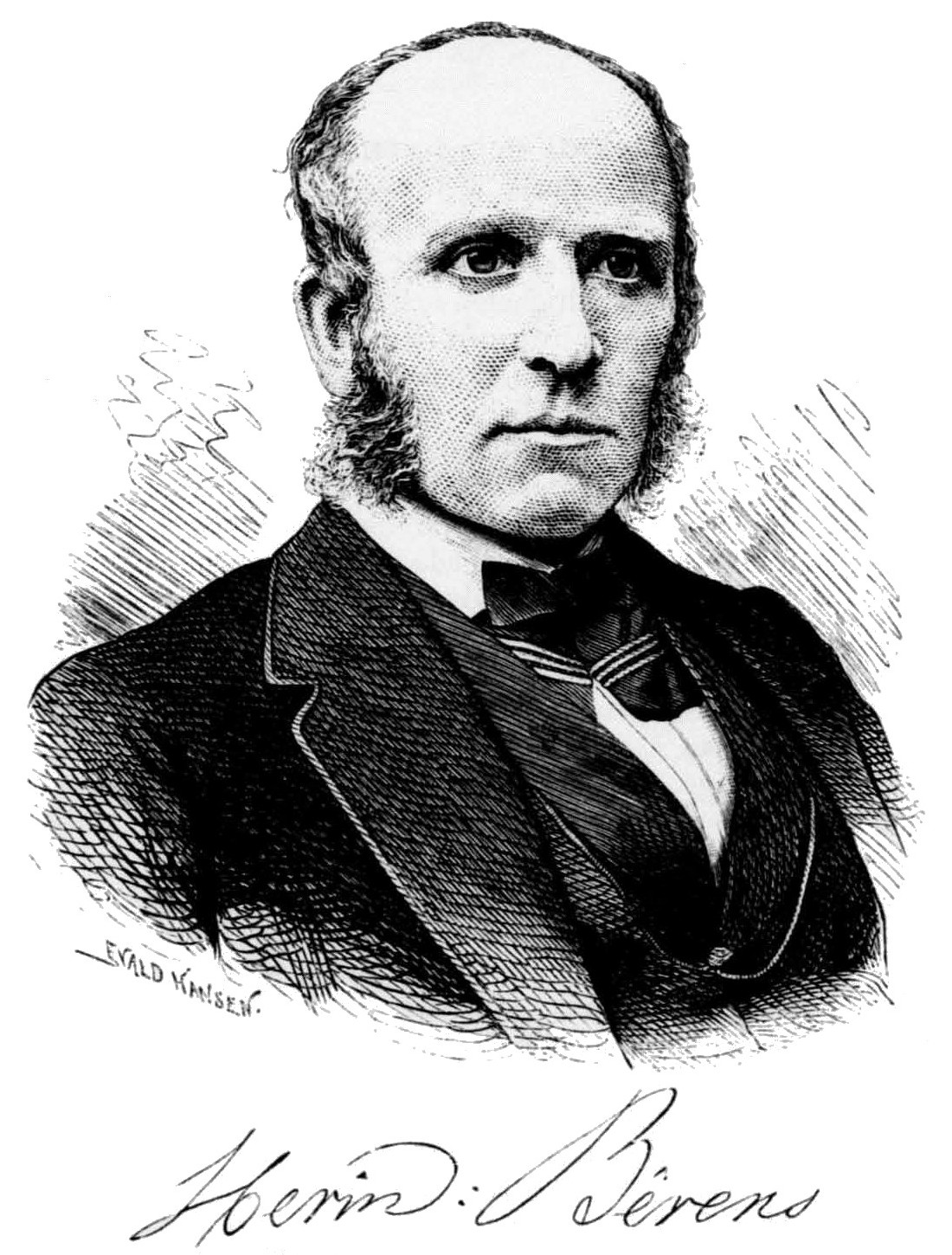
Hermann Berens

Hermann Berens (7 April 1826 – 9 May 1880) was a German-born Swedish Romantic composer famous mainly for his piano music.

He was born in Hamburg, the son of a flute player from Germany. He died in Stockholm, Sweden.

Berens' string trios have been recorded by Ars Amata Zurich in 1999 and Trio ZilliacusPerssonRaitinen in 2006.
