= Camille D'elmar =

American actress

Camille d'Elmar
- Born: Geraldine Lodge; 1860; Rochester, New York
- Died: September 25, 1902 (aged 41–42); Philadelphia, Pennsylvania
- Other names: Mrs. Richard Baker
- Occupation: Actress

Camille d'Elmar (born Geraldine Lodge) (1860 – September 26, 1902) was a stage actress and opera performer from Rochester, New York. Her father was Dr. Charles Lodge of Rochester. She appeared on stage as a youth. d'Elmar was the name she was known by to theater audiences in America and England. Her married name was Mrs. Richard Baker.

When she was six years old d'Elmar appeared with Joseph Jefferson in Rip Van Winkle at the Varieties Theater in New Orleans, Louisiana. She went to England as a child. As a teenager she became popular in London, England, as an actress of singing chambermaids. This was the term given soubrette roles at the time.

d'Elmar returned to America with Emily Soldene for a role in Genevieve de Brabant by Jacques Offenbach. She played other opera bouffes and toured in Frivolity. d'Elmar was with the Frank Daniels Company for a time. She was in a production of A Legal Wreck.

Camille D'elmar was part of the 1896 theater company performing at the Theatre Francis located in Montreal. On March 2, 1896, the company opened the play "The Black Flag" which was followed by more productions.

d'Elmar died in the Medico-Chirurgical Hospital in Philadelphia, Pennsylvania, following an operation for cancer in 1902. She was 41.

Her husband, Richard Baker, was the stage manager of the Grand Opera House in Philadelphia. He cast her for a role in a revival of The Great Ruby, a production which began the week d'Elmar died.
