= W. W. Fosdick =

American poet

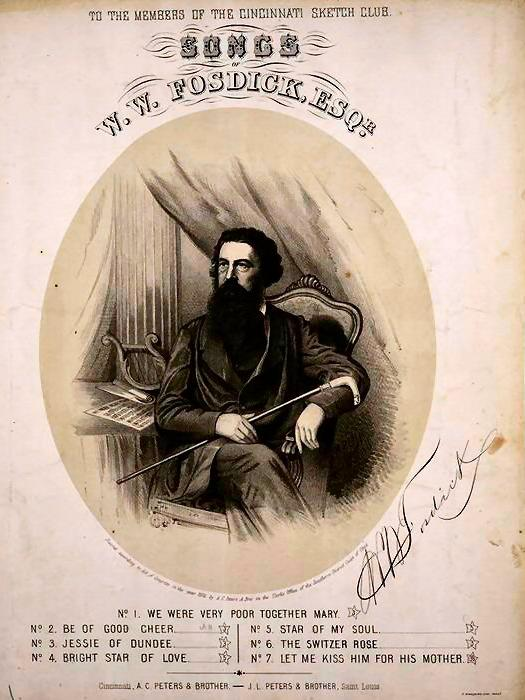
- New York Public Library
- Born: William Whiteman Fosdick; January 28, 1825; Cincinnati, Ohio
- Died: March 8, 1862 (aged 37); Cincinnati, Ohio
- Occupations: Author; poet; editor; lawyer

William Whiteman Fosdick (January 28, 1825 – March 8, 1862) was an American lawyer, poet, writer and song lyricist, primarily remembered today as the writer of original lyrics to the song "Aura Lea" (also known as "Aura Lee") to a melody composed by George R. Poulton.

== Biography ==
Fosdick was born in Cincinnati, Ohio, the son of Thomas K. Fosdick and Julia Drake (1800–1832). His father was a local merchant and banker, while his mother a noted stage actress who came from a British theatrical family. His grandfather, Samuel Drake (née Bryant?), came to America in 1810 and is thought to have been the first to bring a theatre troupe west of the Appalachians. Fosdick's half-sister, from a later marriage, was the popular stage actress, Julia Dean. Fosdick's father died in 1829 and his mother three years later.

After graduating from Transylvania University, Lexington, Kentucky he studied law under the jurist Garnett Duncan in Louisville and later a Judge Pryor. Fosdick first set up a law practice in Covington, Kentucky with a lawyer named James Southgate and a short while later returned to Cincinnati to enter into a law partnership with George C. Williamson. In the early 1850s Fosdick moved his law practice to New York City.

Fosdick's first serious work Malmiztic, the Toltec; and the Cavaliers of the Cross, published in 1851, drew its inspiration from his travels in Mexico over the late 1840s. In 1855, he published a compilation of poems entitled Ariel, and other Poems with illustrations from designs by Elmslie William Dallas.

Fosdick's lyrical poetry such as Ariel, The Maize, The Catawba, The Thrush, The Pawpaw, Light and Night, and Lute and Love often reflected his Mid-Western roots and at times were put to music by composers such as Poulton and Vincent Wallace.

After some seven years in New York Fosdick returned to Cincinnati where, by 1860, he was editor of The Sketch Club, an illustrated periodical supported by local artists and patrons. He died there in 1862 at the age of thirty-seven.

== Bibliography ==
- Appleton's Cyclopedia of American Biography (New York: D. Appleton and Company, 1887–1889), (James Grant Wilson & John Fiske eds.) (6 vols.)
- W. H. Venable, Beginnings of Literary Culture in the Ohio Valley: Historical and Biographical Sketches 114 (Cincinnati: Robert Clarke & Co., 1891)
