= George R. Poulton =

English-born American musician and composer

- Born: 1828; Cricklade, Wiltshire, England
- Died: 1867 (aged 38)
- Occupations: Composer, musician
- Notable work: "Aura Lea"

George Rodway Poulton (bapt. 16 October 1828 – 1867) was an English-born American musician and composer.

He was born in Cricklade, near Cirencester, Wiltshire, England in 1828 to Charles Poulton and Hannah Rodway Poulton. He was baptised in St. Mary's Church and was raised in the town until the age of seven when his parents, Charles and Hannah Poulton, emigrated to Lansingburgh, New York. George Poulton's descendants still have connections with Cricklade.

In 1861, George Poulton composed the melody for the song "Aura Lea", which was popular during the American Civil War, and later became popular with college glee clubs and barbershop quartets. It was also sung at the U.S. Military Academy at West Point, New York. In 1956, the tune (now in the public domain) was given new lyrics and released as the Elvis Presley song "Love Me Tender".

In 1864, he was tarred and feathered after having an affair with a young student. He died in 1867, aged thirty-eight.
