= A. V. Bramble =

English film actor and director (1884–1963)

- Born: Albert Victor Bramble; 1884; Portsmouth, Hampshire, England
- Died: 17 May 1963 (aged 78–79); Friern Barnet, London, England
- Years active: 1914–1952

Albert Victor Bramble (1884–1963) was an English actor and film director. He began his acting career on the stage. He started acting in films in 1914 and subsequently turned to directing and producing films. He died on 17 May 1963.

== Background and early life ==
Born at Portsmouth in May 1884, he was the second of three sons of James Bramble, a senior Royal Navy paymaster, and his wife Pollie Simonds. After education at Forest School, Walthamstow, and Portsmouth Grammar School, where he was a prizeman in drawing, he attended Portsmouth School of Art and displayed particular promise in his black-and-white studies from nature. When not developing his drawing skills he arranged tableaux vivants and acted in student theatrical productions. He subsequently performed with a number of amateur dramatic companies, by 1907 was regularly cast in London stage productions, and in 1910 performed as a professional for the Suffrage Atelier group alongside Maurice Elvey, with whom he was later associated in the silent films industry.

== Progress as an actor ==
In 1911 he appeared in several provincial touring productions, attracting comment on his “clever study” of character and his “histrionic power”, and in 1912 he was rewarded with the role of Sherlock Holmes in The Speckled Band at the London Palladium. He began 1914 in Ernest C. Rolls’s revue Full Inside at the Oxford Music Hall, and in May had the leading role in Hubert Henry Davies’s Mrs Gorringe’s Necklace at Croydon. Later that year he made his first silent film appearance playing Colonel Earl in Maurice Elvey’s production of a dramatisation of John Strange Winter’s 1891 novel Beautiful Jim. He was uncredited in the paperwork accompanying the film and, when his performance was favourably noticed in an edition of Kinematograph Weekly, Elvey intervened to ensure that Bramble was identified by name in the magazine’s next edition.

His debut in Beautiful Jim was quickly followed by appearances in a succession of film adaptations of Charles Darrell melodramas, produced by Elvey for British and Colonial Films. Although Bramble was essentially a character actor, he played the lead role opposite Elisabeth Risdon in some of these productions and, when the pair co-starred in The Sound of Her Voice, the advertisements celebrated their “intense and powerful acting”. However, when Picturegoer magazine invited its readers to select “the Greatest British Film Player”, while Risdon polled the highest number of votes for a female, Bramble did not feature among the favoured males. Nevertheless his cinematic career moved forward, and in early 1916 he both acted in and directed, jointly with Eliot Stannard, British and Colonial’s Jimmy, an adaptation of another John Strange Winter novel. With Stannard he then directed Fatal Fingers, a dramatisation of William le Queux’s novel of that name.

== Career as a director ==
=== Early period ===
In 1917 he joined Cecil Hepworth’s studio, for which he directed a succession of films, notably casting himself in the title role in The Laughing Cavalier. In 1918 his direction, for Master Films, of Bonnie Mary attracted particular praise; filmed in the Scottish Highlands, the quality of its scenic photography was complimented as “hardly ever equalled, certainly never surpassed”. By 1919 his previous six films had been based on scenarios created by Eliot Stannard, and early that year the two men worked together on the first production for British Lion Films, which had just obtained studios at Borehamwood.

This film, an adaptation of a novel by Roy Horniman, was favourably reviewed by the trade press. Described in Kinematograph Weekly as “a credit to the kinema industry of this country”, its success was declared in The Bioscope to be “almost wholly due” to Bramble “who shows that he possesses a quality that is very near genius. So strongly does one feel the producer’s guiding and creative influence throughout the film that the acting, as such, takes rather a second place”. Originally released as A Nonconformist Parson, the film was retitled Heart and Soul by Moss Empires when they acquired the distribution rights. It attracted little notice outside the trade press.

At this time Bramble's work for the production companies behind his films involved as much general project management as artistic direction, and his overall responsibility was frequently acknowledged by the formula "Production under the direction of A. V. Bramble". Until he later worked in association with Harry Bruce Woolfe, his films generally billed him as their producer, and he was commonly spoken of as such even though his direction was and remains his most visible legacy.

=== With Ideal Films ===
British Lion was in financial difficulties by mid-1919, resulting in the Borehamwood facility and Bramble’s services as a producer being taken over by Ideal Films.

Over the course of the next three years he made eleven films for Ideal including, in 1920, the first screen version of Emily Brontë’s Wuthering Heights. In this endeavour, again working to a Stannard scenario, he was judged to have captured the intensity of the novel, and praise for his achievement and his “unusual perception of scenic values” was not confined to the trade press. The Times’s critic pronounced it “one if the best pieces of work that has yet come out of a British studio”, and at least one cinema showing the film promoted it as "Produced by A. V. Bramble, England’s Greatest Producer".

In 1922 he returned to the Brontë Country for the making of Shirley. This was his last film for Ideal.

=== War films ===
In 1923 he joined with Harry Bruce Woolfe to produce, for British Instructional Films, a dramatic reconstruction of Viscount Allenby’s campaign in Palestine, released under the title Armageddon. In this he directed the live action sequences, as he did in the following year when with Woolf he produced Zeebrugge - a re-enactment of the 1918 raid on the U-boat base in the Bruges Canal. His younger brother, Commander Frank Bramble, DSO, had been on board the cruiser HMS Vindictive during the raid and was among the participants able to advise on the accuracy of the reconstruction.

=== Mid-career ===
In 1923 Bramble played Henry II in Becket, a screen adaptation of Alfred Tennyson’s play in which Sir Frank Benson made his first appearance on film. Bramble’s performance was described as “dynamic” and “vivid” and the interaction between him and Benson was said to be “staged with a real sense of dramatic value”. The film was produced by Stoll Pictures which Bramble joined in 1924.

In 1925 he resumed stage appearances, acting in a revival of Edward Knoblock’s Kismet at the New Oxford and in Barbara Cartland’s first play Blood Money (which had previously been banned by the Lord Chamberlain) at the Q Theatre. In 1926 he acted in Graham Cutts’s film The Rolling Road and in 1927 collaborated with Anthony Asquith in the making of Shooting Stars, a film essentially about the world of film. He was originally announced as the director of this drama devised and scripted by Asquith but later press coverage suggested the pair co-directed the film. In 1968 The Times’s obituary of Asquith referred to Bramble’s “supervision” of Asquith’s direction but this was subsequently corrected to state that Bramble was actually the director.

=== Final years as a director ===
In 1928 he directed Chick, the first in a series of adaptations of Edgar Wallace mystery novels, and he followed this with The Man Who Changed His Name, both productions for the reformed British Lion Films, now chaired by Wallace himself. These silent films enjoyed limited box-office success at a time when “talkies” were quickly taking over the cinematic world, and after directing The Veteran of Waterloo and Mrs Dane's Defence Bramble retired from directing in 1933.

== Later years ==
During the Second World War he was badly injured by a land mine explosion and was left completely deaf. He was, however, cast by Carol Reed to play the tribesman Badavi in the 1951 production of Outcast of the Islands.

In retirement he initially lived at Emsworth and, an accomplished artist, spent time painting and working in pastels. In 1955 he married Elizabeth Calkin who had worked as his assistant at Ideal Films. He died at Friern Barnet on 17 May 1963. The value of his estate for probate was a little under £388.

== Filmography ==
=== Director ===
- Jimmy (1916)
- Fatal Fingers (1916)
- When Paris Sleeps (1917)
- Profit and the Loss (1917)
- The Laughing Cavalier (1917)
- Bonnie Mary (1918)
- The Single Man (1918)
- Her Cross (1919)
- A Smart Set (1919)
- Heart and Soul (1919)
- Wuthering Heights (1920)
- Torn Sails (1920)
- Mr. Gilfil's Love Story (1920)
- Her Benny (1920)
- The Will (1921)
- The Prince and the Beggarmaid
- The Rotters (1921)
- The Old Country (1921)
- The Bachelor's Club (1921)
- The Little Mother (1922)
- Shirley (1922)
- The Card (1922)
- Zeebrugge (1924)
- Bodiam Castle and Eric the Slender (1926)
- The Man Who Changed His Name (1928)
- Shooting Stars (1928)
- Chick (1928)
- A Lucky Sweep (1932)
- The Veteran of Waterloo (1933, short)
- Mrs. Dane's Defence (1933)

=== Actor ===
- The Loss of the Birkenhead (1914)
- The Idol of Paris (1914)
- The Courage of a Coward (1914)
- Her Luck in London (1914)
- The Suicide Club (1914)
- Wild Oats (1915)
- The World's Desire (1915)
- There's Good in Everyone (1915)
- The Mystery of a Hansom Cab (1915)
- Shadows (1915)
- Motherhood (1915)
- Midshipman Easy (1915)
- Honeymoon for Three (1915)
- Home (1915)
- Her Nameless Child (1915)
- From Shopgirl to Duchess (1915)
- At the Torrent's Mercy (1915)
- Another Man's Wife (1915)
- The World's Desire (1915)
- Florence Nightingale (1915)
- Jimmy (1916)
- Fatal Fingers (1916)
- A Soldier and a Man (1916)
- When Paris Sleeps (1917)
- Nearer My God to Thee (1917)
- Broken Threads (1917)
- The Cost of a Kiss (1917)
- The Laughing Cavalier (1917)
- Towards the Light (1918)
- The Touch of a Child (1918)
- The Message (1918)
- The Hanging Judge (1918)
- Becket (1923)
- The Rolling Road (1928)
- Outcast of the Islands (1952)
