= Midshipman Easy (1915 film) =

1915 film by Maurice Elvey

Midshipman Easy is a 1915 British silent adventure film directed by Maurice Elvey and starring Elisabeth Risdon, Fred Groves and A. V. Bramble. It was based on the 1836 novel Mr Midshipman Easy by Frederick Marryat which was made into a sound film Midshipman Easy by Carol Reed in 1935.

== Cast ==
- Elisabeth Risdon - Don's Daughter
- Fred Groves - Don Sylvio
- A. V. Bramble - Mesty
- Compton Coutts - Easy
