= There's Good in Everyone =

1915 film by Maurice Elvey

There's Good in Everyone is a 1915 British silent romance film directed by Maurice Elvey and starring Elisabeth Risdon, Fred Groves and A.V. Bramble.

== Cast ==
- Elisabeth Risdon - Beatrice Maybrook
- Fred Groves - Hon. Reginald
- A.V. Bramble - Marquis
- M. Gray Murray - Mr. Maybrook
