= The World's Desire (film) =

- Directed by: Sidney Morgan
- Written by: Sidney Morgan
- Starring: Lilian Braithwaite; Fred Groves; A.V. Bramble
- Production company: British and Colonial
- Distributed by: Ideal Films
- Release date: March 1915
- Country: United Kingdom
- Languages: Silent; English intertitles

The World's Desire is a 1915 British silent drama film directed by Sidney Morgan and starring Lilian Braithwaite, Fred Groves and A.V. Bramble.

== Cast ==
- Lilian Braithwaite as Claire Bennett
- Fred Groves as Sir Richard Bennett
- A.V. Bramble as George Cleaver
- Joan Morgan as Betty
- M. Gray Murray as Dr. Frank Saxon
- Kathleen Warwick as Mrs. Cleaver

== Bibliography ==
- Palmer, Scott. British Film Actors' Credits, 1895-1987. McFarland, 1988.
