= Honeymoon for Three (1915 film) =

1915 film by Maurice Elvey

- Directed by: Maurice Elvey
- Screenplay by: Eliot Stannard
- Starring: Charles Hawtrey; Elisabeth Risdon; Fred Groves
- Production company: British & Colonial Kinematograph Company
- Distributed by: Kinematograph Trading Company
- Release date: January 1915
- Running time: 4 reels
- Country: United Kingdom
- Language: Silent

Honeymoon for Three is a 1915 British silent comedy film directed by Maurice Elvey.

== Plot summary ==
A disguised/incognito prince becomes involved in a romantic farce when he travels with a ballerina and swaps identities to evade detectives. The identity switch entangles him with a newlywed American millionaire and leads to comic misunderstandings before the mix-ups are resolved.

== Cast ==
- Charles Hawtrey as Prince Ferdinand
- Elisabeth Risdon as Molly Van Dam
- Fred Groves as Cornelius V. Van Dam
- A. V. Bramble as Duke of Monte Casa
- Ruth Mackay as Mme. Alova
- Compton Coutts as Detective
- M. Gray Murray
- Edith Evans
