= The Idol of Paris (1914 film) =

- Directed by: Maurice Elvey
- Written by: Charles Darrell (play); Eliot Stannard
- Starring: Elisabeth Risdon; Fred Groves; A. V. Bramble
- Production companies: British & Colonial Kinematograph Company
- Distributed by: Ideal Films
- Release date: 1914
- Country: United Kingdom
- Languages: Silent; English intertitles

The Idol of Paris is a 1914 British silent drama film directed by Maurice Elvey and starring Elisabeth Risdon, Fred Groves and A. V. Bramble. The film was based on a play of the same title by Charles Darrell.

== Cast ==
- Elisabeth Risdon as Flare-Flare
- Fred Groves as Philippe Castelle
- A. V. Bramble as Prince Serbius
- Gordon Dennis as Victor Sancterre
- Constance Walton as Madame

== Bibliography ==
- Goble, Alan. The Complete Index to Literary Sources in Film. Walter de Gruyter, 1999.
- Murphy, Robert. Directors in British and Irish Cinema: A Reference Companion. British Film Institute, 2006.
