= Chick (1928 film) =

1928 British film by A. V. Bramble

- Directed by: A. V. Bramble
- Written by: Edgar Wallace (novel and screenplay)
- Starring: Bramwell Fletcher; Trilby Clark; Chili Bouchier; Rex Maurice
- Production company: British Lion Film Corporation
- Distributed by: Ideal Films
- Release date: 28 August 1928
- Country: United Kingdom
- Languages: Silent; English intertitles

Chick is a 1928 British silent drama film directed by A. V. Bramble and starring Bramwell Fletcher, Trilby Clark and Chili Bouchier. The film was made at Islington Studios by British Lion. It was based on the 1923 novel of the same title by Edgar Wallace. It was remade in 1936 starring Sydney Howard in the title role.

== Cast ==
- Bramwell Fletcher as Chick Beane
- Trilby Clark as Gwenda Maynard
- Chili Bouchier as Minnie Jarvis
- Rex Maurice as Marquis of Mansar
- Edward O'Neill as Mr. Leither
- John Cromer as Mr. Jarvis

== Bibliography ==
- Low, Rachael. History of the British Film, 1918-1929. George Allen & Unwin, 1971. ISBN 0047910216.
- Wood, Linda. British Films 1927-1939. British Film Institute, 1986.
