= The Troubles of an Heiress =

1914 film directed by Sidney Northcote

The Troubles of an Heiress is a 1914 British silent comedy film directed by Sidney Northcote and starring Miss Normand, M. Gray Murray and Vera Northcote. It was produced by the British and Colonial Kinematograph Company.

== Cast ==
- Miss Normand - Diana Coney
- M. Gray Murray - Lord Painkurst
- Vera Northcote - The Kandy Kid
- Mr. Billington - Mark Coney
