= Shirley (novel) =

1849 social novel by Charlotte Brontë

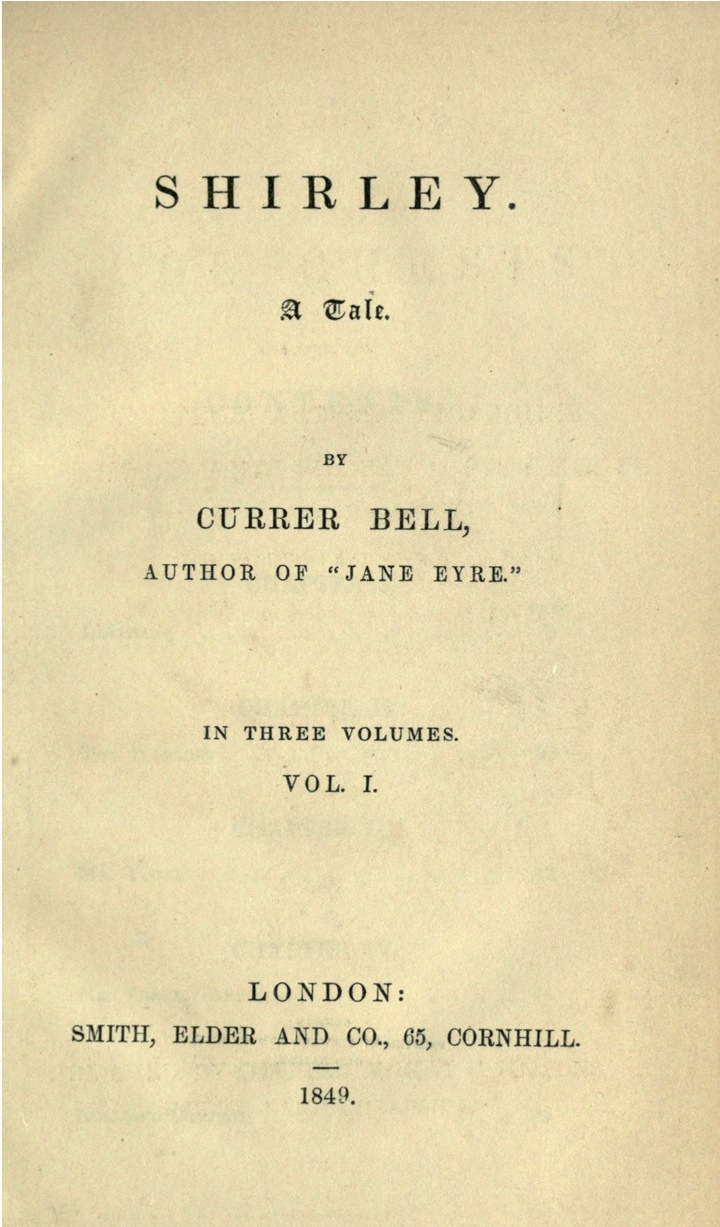
- Title page of the first edition, 1849
- Author: Charlotte Brontë
- Language: English
- Genre: Social novel
- Set in: Yorkshire, 1811–12
- Publisher: Smith, Elder & Co.
- Publication date: 26 October 1849
- Publication place: United Kingdom
- Media type: Print: hardback
- Pages: 572, in three volumes
- Dewey Decimal: 823.8
- LC Class: PR4167 .S4 1849
- Preceded by: Jane Eyre
- Followed by: Villette
- Text: Shirley at Wikisource

Shirley, A Tale is an 1849 social novel by the English novelist Charlotte Brontë. It was Brontë's second published novel after Jane Eyre (originally published under Brontë's pseudonym Currer Bell). The novel is set in Yorkshire in 1811–12, during the industrial depression resulting from the Napoleonic Wars and the War of 1812. The novel is set against the backdrop of the Luddite uprisings in the Yorkshire textile industry.

The novel's popularity led to the surname Shirley becoming popular as a first name for women. Brontë tells the reader it was a tradition in the family to only give this surname as a first name to male children. It wasn't commonly used as a first name in England before the book. It is now regarded as a female first name.

== Background ==
While Charlotte Brontë was writing Shirley, three of her siblings died. Her brother Branwell died in September 1848, and her sister Emily fell ill and died in December. Brontë resumed writing, but then her only remaining sibling, her sister Anne, became ill and died in May 1849.

Some critics believe that the character of Caroline Helstone was loosely based on Anne and it has been speculated that Brontë originally planned to let Caroline die but changed her mind because of her family tragedies. However, Ellen Nussey, Charlotte's lifelong friend, claimed that the character of Caroline was based on herself.

Charlotte Brontë told Elizabeth Gaskell that Shirley is what she believed her sister, Emily Brontë, would have been if she had been born into a wealthy family. Again, Ellen Nussey, who knew Emily as well as anyone outside the family, did not recognise Emily in Shirley.

The maiden name of Mrs Pryor is Agnes Grey, the name of the main character in Anne's first novel. She was based on Margaret Wooler, the principal of Roe Head School, which Brontë attended as both student and teacher.

== Locations ==
The novel is set in and around the Spen Valley in what is now called West Yorkshire (then the West Riding of Yorkshire). This area is now known as "Shirley country" to some locals. Briarmains, a house mentioned in the novel, is based on the Red House in Gomersal, where Mary Taylor, a friend of Charlotte, lived. The house is currently closed but previously open as a museum. Fieldhead, another house in the novel, is based on the Elizabethan manor house Oakwell Hall, which is also now a museum. The attack on Robert Moore's mill was based on the Luddite attack on Cartwright's Mill at Rawfolds, Liversedge, though it is believed that Charlotte also took some inspiration from Taylor's Mill at Hunsworth. Charlotte's father Patrick Bronte had lived in the Hightown area of Liversedge for a while, and Charlotte knew the area well.

== Synopsis ==
Robert Moore is a mill owner noted for apparent ruthlessness towards his employees. He has laid off many of them, and is apparently indifferent to their consequent impoverishment. In fact, he had no choice, since the mill is deeply in debt. He is determined to restore his family's honour and fortune.

As the novel opens, Robert awaits delivery of new labour-saving machinery for the mill, which will enable him to lay off additional employees. Together with some friends, he watches all night, but the machinery is destroyed by "frame-breakers" on the way to the mill. Robert's business difficulties continue, due in part to continuing labour unrest, but even more to the Napoleonic Wars and the accompanying Orders in Council, which forbid British merchants from trading in American markets.

Robert is very close to his cousin Caroline Helstone, who comes to his house to be taught French and arithmetic by his sister, Hortense. Caroline worships Robert. Caroline's father is dead and her mother has abandoned her, leaving her to be brought up by her uncle, Rev. Matthew Helstone. To keep himself from falling in love with her Robert keeps his distance, since he cannot afford to marry for pleasure or for love.

Caroline realises that Robert is growing increasingly distant and withdraws into herself. Her uncle does not sympathise with her "fancies". She has no money of her own, so she cannot leave, which is what she longs to do. She suggests that she might take up the role of governess, but her uncle dismisses the idea and assures her that she need not work for a living.

Caroline recovers somewhat when she meets Shirley, an independent heiress whose parents are dead and who lives with Mrs Pryor, her former governess. Shirley is lively, cheerful, full of ideas about how to use her money and how to help people, and very interested in business. Caroline and Shirley soon become close friends. Caroline becomes convinced that Shirley and Robert will marry. Shirley likes Robert, is very interested in his work, and is concerned about him and the threats he receives from laid-off millworkers. Both good and bad former employees are depicted. Some passages show the real suffering of those who were honest workers and can no longer find good employment; other passages show how some people use losing their jobs as an excuse to get drunk, fight with their previous employers, and incite other people to violence. Shirley uses her money to help the poorest, but she is also motivated by the desire to prevent any attack on Robert.

One night, Rev. Matthew Helstone asks Shirley to stay with Caroline while he is away. Caroline and Shirley realise that an attack on the mill is imminent. They hear the dog barking and realise that a group of rioters has come to a halt outside the rectory. They overhear the rioters talking about entering the house, but are relieved when they decide to go on. The women go to the mill together to warn Robert, but they are too late. They witness the ensuing battle from their hiding place.

The whole neighbourhood becomes convinced that Robert and Shirley will marry. The anticipation of this event causes Caroline to fall ill. Mrs Pryor comes to look after her and learns the cause of Caroline's sorrow. She continues her vigil even as Caroline worsens daily. Mrs Pryor then reveals to Caroline that she is Caroline's mother. She had abandoned her because Caroline looked exactly like her father, the husband who tortured Mrs Pryor and made her life miserable. She had little money, so when her brother-in-law offered to bring up the child, she accepted the offer, took up the name of Pryor and went off to become a governess. Caroline now has a reason to live, since she knows that she can go and live with her mother, and begins to recover.

Shirley's uncle and aunt come to visit her. They bring with them their daughters, their son, and their son's tutor, Louis Moore. He is Robert's younger brother and taught Shirley when she was younger. Caroline is puzzled by Shirley's haughty and formal behaviour towards Louis. Two men fall in love with Shirley and woo her, but she rejects both of them because she does not love them. The relationship between Shirley and Louis, meanwhile, remains ambivalent. There are days when Louis can ask Shirley to come to the schoolroom and recite the French pieces she learned from him when she was younger. On other days Shirley ignores Louis. However, when Shirley is upset the only person she can confide in is Louis. After a supposedly mad dog bites Shirley and makes her think that she is to die early, no one except Louis can make her reveal her fears.

Robert returns one dark night, first stopping at the market and then returning to his home with a friend. The friend asks him why he left when it seemed so certain that Shirley loved him and would have married him. Robert replies that he had assumed the same, and that he had proposed to Shirley before he left. Shirley had at first laughed, thinking that he was not serious, and then cried when she discovered that he was. She had told him that she knew that he did not love her, and that he asked for her hand not for her sake, but for her wealth. Robert had walked away filled with a sense of humiliation, even as he knew that she was right. This self-disgust had driven Robert away to London, where he realised that restoring the family name was not as important as maintaining his self-respect. He had returned home determined to close the mill if he had to, and go away to Canada to make his fortune. Just as Robert finishes his narration, his friend hears a gunshot and Robert falls from his horse.

The friend takes Robert to his own home and looks after him. After a turn for the worse, Robert slowly gets better. A visit from Caroline revives him, but she has to come secretly, hiding from her uncle and his friend and his family. Robert soon moves back to his own home and persuades his sister that the very thing their house needs to cheer it up is a visit from Caroline. Robert asks for Caroline's forgiveness.

Louis proposes to Shirley, despite the difference in their relative situations, and Shirley agrees to marry him. At first Caroline is to be Shirley's bridesmaid, but Robert proposes to her and she accepts. The novel ends with Caroline marrying Robert and Shirley marrying Louis.

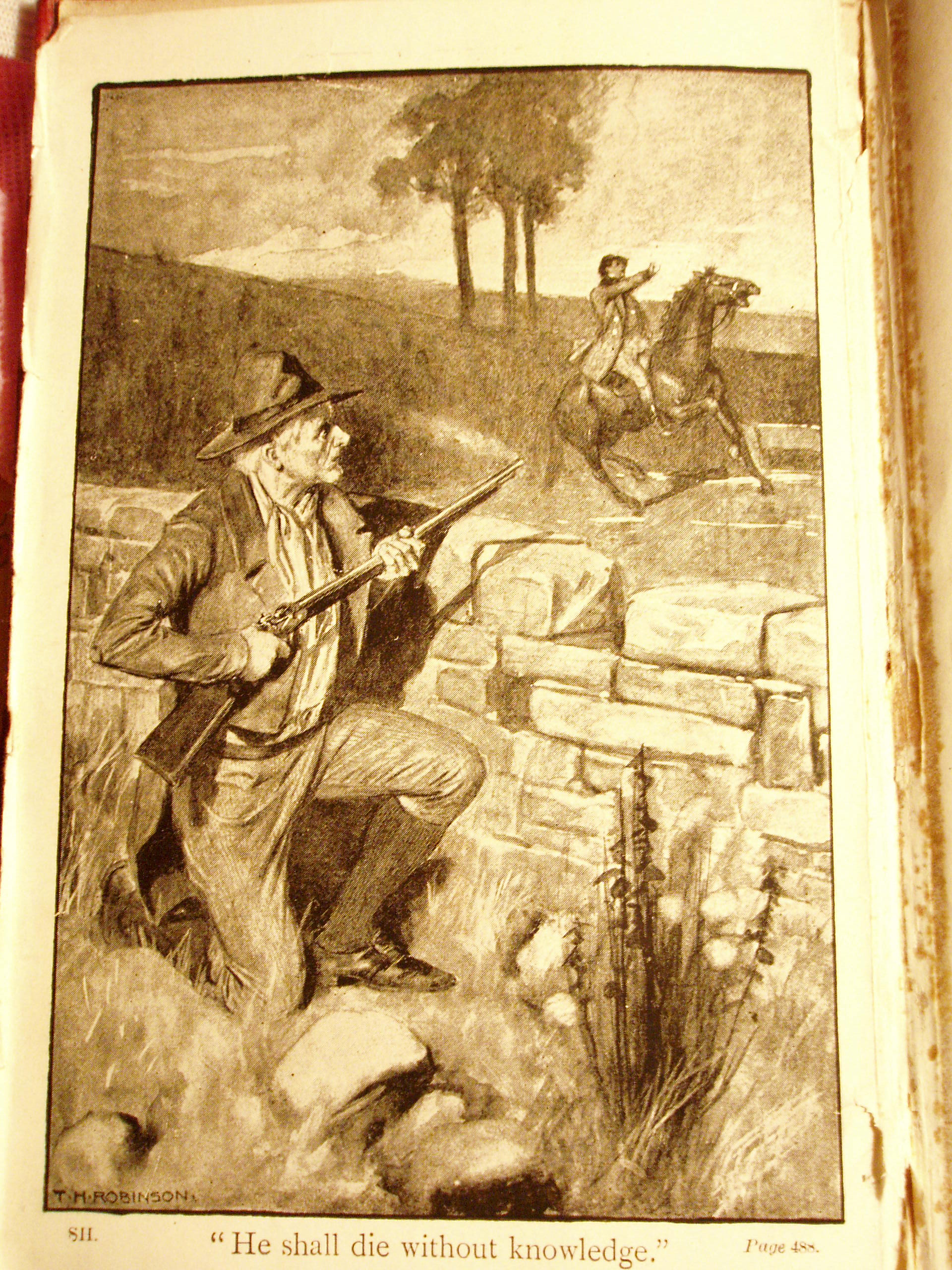
Illustration by Thomas Heath Robinson

== Characters ==
The four central characters are studies in contrast: the two friends Caroline Helstone and Shirley Keeldar, and their lovers, the brothers Robert and Louis Gérard Moore.

- Robert Gérard Moore – A 30-year-old industrialist whose textile mill is idle because of the war. Perceived as an outsider because he comes from Antwerp, even though he is a cousin of Caroline's. Robert Moore installs new labour-saving machinery in his mill and becomes the target of Luddite attacks.
- Louis Gérard Moore – Robert's brother, working as a tutor for Shirley's uncle.
- Caroline Helstone – An 18-year-old timid and uncertain, but also wise and capable young woman, the niece of Rev. Helstone and best friend of Shirley.
- Shirley Keeldar – A 21-year-old orphaned heiress to a fortune. A headstrong, independent and determined young woman.

Other characters in the novel include:

- Rev. Matthew Helstone – Caroline's uncle. A fierce man, who is not cruel, but still shows little affection for his niece. Marriage has made him distrustful of women in general.
- Hortense Gérard Moore – Robert and Louis's sister.
- Hiram Yorke – A local landowner.
- Joseph "Joe" Scott – Robert Moore's foreman at the mill.
- Mrs Pryor – Shirley's timid but wise governess, who moves to Fieldhead together with Shirley. She eventually turns out to be Caroline's long-lost mother, Mrs Agnes Helstone.
- The three curates of the three parishes – the Anglo-Irishman Peter Malone, the Cockney Joseph Donne, and the amiable Davy Sweeting.
- William Farren – a hardworking, patient worker. The book's example of the perfect working-class man.

== Style ==
Unlike Jane Eyre, which is written in the first person and narrated by the title character, Shirley is narrated by an unnamed female third-person narrator, a Yorkshirewoman and younger friend of the Yorke family, looking back from the perspective of the late 1840s. For her third novel Villette, Brontë returned to first-person narration.

== Adaptations ==
The novel has been adapted to the screen only once, in 1922. The silent adaptation was directed by A. V. Bramble and Carlotta Breese starred as the title character.

In March 2014, BBC Radio 4 broadcast a ten-episode dramatisation by Rachel Joyce in the station's 15 Minute Drama slot. Narrated by Lesley Sharp, the series starred Joanne Froggatt as Caroline and Jemima Rooper as Shirley.

== Critical reception ==
Coming soon after Jane Eyre, which was extremely successful, Shirley originally received a muted reception from critics.
