= Shirley (1922 film) =

1922 film

- Directed by: A. V. Bramble
- Written by: Charlotte Brontë (novel); Arthur Q. Walton
- Starring: Carlotta Breese; Clive Brook; Elizabeth Irving; Mabel Terry-Lewis
- Production company: Ideal Film Company
- Distributed by: Ideal Film Company
- Release date: 1922
- Country: United Kingdom
- Language: English

Shirley is a 1922 British silent drama film directed by A. V. Bramble and starring Carlotta Breese, Clive Brook, Elizabeth Irving and Mabel Terry-Lewis. It is based on the 1849 novel Shirley by Charlotte Brontë.

== Cast ==
- Carlotta Breese as Shirley
- Clive Brook as Robert Moore
- Elizabeth Irving as Caroline Helston
- Mabel Terry-Lewis as Mrs. Prior
- Harvey Braban as Nunnally
- Joe Nightingale
- David Miller
