= The Evolution of Katherine =

1914 play by E. Temple Thurston

The Evolution of Katherine is a 1914 play by the British writer E. Temple Thurston. In 1916 it was adapted into a film Driven directed by Maurice Elvey. It is one of a number of Thurston's works to be turned into films. The play is sometimes itself alternatively known as Driven.

== Bibliography ==
- Goble, Alan. The Complete Index to Literary Sources in Film. Walter de Gruyter, 1999.
