= The Gay Lord Quex (1917 film) =

1917 film

- Directed by: Maurice Elvey
- Written by: Arthur Wing Pinero; Eliot Stannard
- Starring: Ben Webster; Irene Vanbrugh; Lilian Braithwaite
- Production company: Ideal Film Company
- Distributed by: Ideal Film Company
- Release date: August 1917
- Country: United Kingdom
- Language: English

The Gay Lord Quex is a 1917 British silent comedy film directed by Maurice Elvey and starring Ben Webster, Irene Vanbrugh and Lilian Braithwaite. It is based on the 1899 play The Gay Lord Quex by Arthur Wing Pinero.

== Cast ==
- Ben Webster - Lord Quex
- Irene Vanbrugh - Sophie Fullgarney
- Lilian Braithwaite - Duchess of Strood
- Hayford Hobbs - Captain Bartling
- Margaret Bannerman - Muriel Eden
- Donald Calthrop - Valma
- Claire Pauncefort - Lady Owbridge
- Lyston Lyle - Frayn
