= Smith (1917 film) =

1917 silent film by Maurice Elvey

- Directed by: Maurice Elvey
- Starring: Elisabeth Risdon; Fred Groves; Manora Thew
- Release date: 1917

Smith is a 1917 English silent romance film directed by Maurice Elvey and starring Elisabeth Risdon, Fred Groves and Manora Thew. It was based on the 1909 play Smith by Somerset Maugham.

== Cast ==
- Elisabeth Risdon as Smith
- Fred Groves as Tom Freeman
- Manora Thew as Rose Baker
- Guy Newall as Algy Peppercorn
- Douglas Munro as Otto Rosenburg
- Lydia Bilbrook as Mrs. Rosenburg
