= The Laughing Cavalier (disambiguation) =

The Laughing Cavalier is a 1624 painting by Frans Hals in The Wallace Collection, London.

The Laughing Cavalier may also refer to:

- The Laughing Cavalier (novel), a 1913 prequel to The Scarlet Pimpernel series of novels by Baroness Orczy, about the supposed subject of the painting
  - The Laughing Cavalier (film), a 1917 British film adaptation of the novel
- The Laughing Cavalier, an album by the band Wallace Collection
