= Frederick Culley =

British actor (1879–1942)

- Born: 8 March 1879; Plymouth, Devon, United Kingdom
- Died: 3 November 1942 (aged 63); Berkshire, United Kingdom
- Other name: Frederick William Culley
- Occupation: Film actor
- Years active: 1914–1943

Frederick Culley (8 March 1879 – 3 November 1942) was a British film actor. He is best remembered as the kindly Dr. Sutton in The Four Feathers (1939). His father, Richard Palethorpe Culley, was an entrepreneur and philanthropist and his mother, Mary Widgery, came from a family of artists. Her father was a landscape painter, William Widgery, and her brother, Frederick Widgery, painted in the same genre. Frederick Culley began his career in the theater, where his talent was recognized by the good reviews he usually received in the London press. He appeared briefly in silent films before entering talkies but, by 1930, Culley was already 51 years old and his roles were primarily supporting ones. He was remarkably effective as Dr. Sutton, using a cane and convincing that he was in pain or discomfort because, in the book that inspired the movie, his character had suffered an accident with his leg. There was nothing wrong with the actor's own legs. Culley appeared in several other Alexander Korda productions. Frederick Culley was married to Mildred C. Thomas in 1920. They had no children. The actor died of lung cancer at the Three Swans Hotel, Hungerford, Berkshire, where he was staying.

== Filmography ==
Year	Title	Role	Notes
1914	The Suicide Club	Captain Geraldine	
1931	Madame Guillotine	Marquis	
1933	The Private Life of Henry VIII	Duke of Norfolk	Uncredited
1934	The Scarlet Pimpernel		Uncredited
1935	Once a Thief	Sir John Chirwin	
1935	Peg of Old Drury	Minor Role	Uncredited
1936	Men of Yesterday		
1936	Talk of the Devil	Mr. Alderson	
1936	Conquest of the Air	Roger Bacon	
1937	Our Fighting Navy	The Admiral	
1937	Knight Without Armour	Stanfield	
1937	Mr. Smith Carries On	Mr. Fane	
1937	Dinner at the Ritz		Uncredited
1937	The Rat	Judge	
1938	Special Edition	Dr. Pearson	
1938	The Drum	Dr.Murphy	
1938	The Rebel Son	Prince Zammitsky	
1939	Sword of Honour	Duke of Honiton	
1939	Annie Laurie	Robert Anderson	
1939	The Four Feathers	Dr. Sutton	
1942	Uncensored	Victor Lanvin	
1942	The Young Mr. Pitt	Sir Wm. Farquhar	
1943	The Bells Go Down	Vicar	(final film role)
