= Gilbert Gets Tiger-It is =

Gilbert Gets Tiger-Itis
- Directed by: Maurice Elvey
- Written by: Maurice Elvey
- Starring: Elisabeth Risdon; Fred Groves
- Production companies: British & Colonial Kinematograph Company
- Release date: January 1915
- Country: United Kingdom
- Languages: Silent; English intertitles

Gilbert Gets Tiger-Itis is a 1915 British silent short comedy film directed by Maurice Elvey and starring Fred Groves and Elisabeth Risdon. The title character has previously appeared in another film in the same year, Gilbert Dying to Die.

== Cast ==
- Fred Groves as Gilbert
- Elisabeth Risdon as Mrs. Gilbert

== Bibliography ==
- Murphy, Robert. Directors in British and Irish Cinema: A Reference Companion. British Film Institute, 2006.
