= Mr Midshipman Easy =

1836 novel by Frederick Marryat

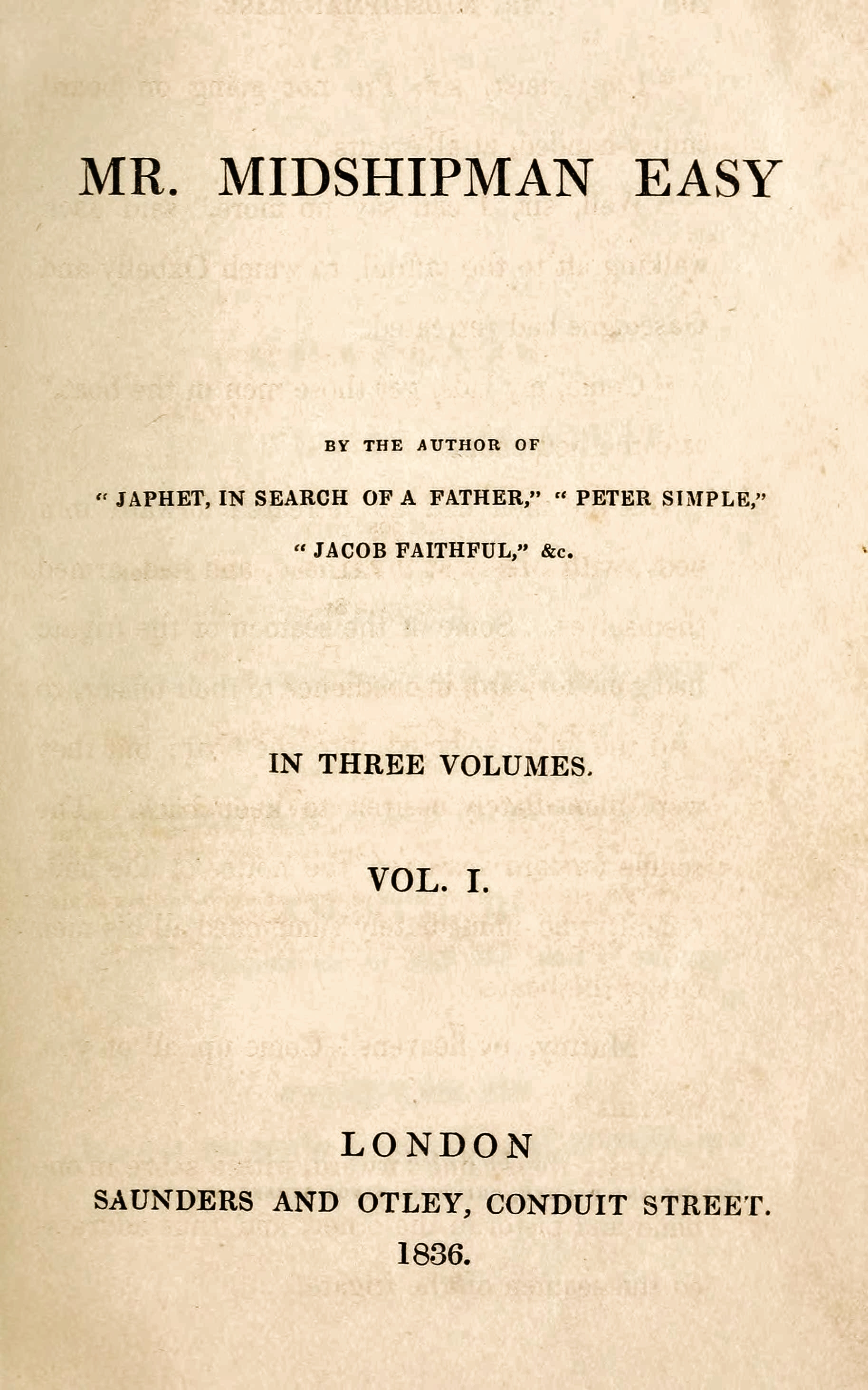
- First edition title page
- Author: Frederick Marryat
- Language: English
- Publication date: 1836

Mr Midshipman Easy is an 1836 novel by Frederick Marryat, a retired captain in the British Royal Navy. The novel is set during the Napoleonic Wars, in which Marryat himself served with distinction.

== Plot summary ==
Easy is the son of foolish parents, who spoiled him. His father regards himself as a philosopher, with a firm belief in the "rights of man, equality, and all that; how every person was born to inherit his share of the earth, a right at present only admitted to a certain length that is, about six feet, for we all inherit our graves, and are allowed to take possession without dispute." But no one would listen to Mr Easy's philosophy. The women would not acknowledge the rights of men, whom they declared always to be in the wrong; and, as the gentlemen who visited Mr Easy were all men of property, they could not perceive the advantages of sharing with those who had none. However, they allowed him to discuss the question, while they discussed his port wine. The wine was good, if the arguments were not, and we must take things as we find them in this world."

By the time he is a teenager, Easy has adopted his father's point of view, to the point where he no longer believes in private property.

Easy joins the navy, which his father believes to be the best example of an equal society, and Easy becomes friendly with a lower deck seaman named Mesty (Mephistopheles Faust), an escaped slave, who had been a prince in Africa. Mesty is sympathetic to Easy's philosophizing, which seems to offer him a way up from his lowly job of "boiling kettle for de young gentlemen"; but once Mesty is promoted to ship's corporal and put in charge of discipline, he changes his mind: "...now I tink a good deal lately, and by all de power, I tink equality all stuff." "All stuff, Mesty, why? you used to think otherwise." "Yes, Massa Easy, but den I boil de kettle for all young gentleman. Now dat I ship's corporal and hab cane, I tink so no longer."

In some way Mesty is the real hero of the novel, as he pulls Easy out of several scrapes the impulsive 17-year-old gets himself into as he cruises the Mediterranean on several British ships.

Easy becomes a competent officer, in spite of his notions. His mother dies, and he returns home to find his father is completely mad. Easy senior has developed an apparatus for reducing or enlarging phrenological bumps on the skull, but as he attempts to reduce his own bump which controls benevolence, the machine kills him. Easy throws out the criminal servants his father has employed and puts the estate to rights, demanding back rents from the tenants, and evicting those who will not pay. Using his new-found wealth, he formally quits the navy, rigs out his own privateering vessel, and returns to Sicily to claim his bride Agnes. As he is a wealthy gentleman now, no longer a junior midshipman, her family cannot refuse him, and he and Agnes live happily ever after.

== Film adaptations ==
The novel was adapted as an adventure film twice in the UK: in 1915 as a silent film, Midshipman Easy directed by Maurice Elvey, and in 1935 with sound, Midshipman Easy directed by Carol Reed.
