= The Loss of the Birkenhead =

- Directed by: Maurice Elvey
- Starring: Elisabeth Risdon; Fred Groves; A. V. Bramble
- Production companies: British & Colonial Kinematograph Company
- Distributed by: Ruffells Films
- Release date: July 1914
- Country: United Kingdom
- Languages: Silent; English intertitles

The Loss of the Birkenhead is a 1914 British silent historical drama film directed by Maurice Elvey and starring Elisabeth Risdon, Fred Groves and A. V. Bramble. The film is set against the backdrop of the sinking of the troopship HMS Birkenhead in 1852.

== Cast ==
- Elisabeth Risdon as Deborah
- Fred Groves as Seth
- A. V. Bramble
- M. Gray Murray
- Joyce Templeton
- Beatrix Templeton

== Bibliography ==
- Murphy, Robert. Directors in British and Irish Cinema: A Reference Companion. British Film Institute, 2006.
