= Mabel Terry-Lewis =

English actress (1872–1957)

Mabel Terry-Lewis photographed by Bassano in 1920

Mabel Gwynedd Terry-Lewis (born as Mabel Gwynedd Lewis) (28 October 1872 – 28 November 1957) was an English actress and a member of the Terry-Gielgud dynasty of actors of the 19th and 20th centuries.

After a successful career in her twenties and thirties she married and retired from the stage in 1904. Her husband died in 1917 and she returned to the theatre in 1920, continuing to act on stage and in films until the late 1940s. Among her celebrated roles was Lady Bracknell in The Importance of Being Earnest, which she played opposite her nephew John Gielgud in 1930.

== Life and career ==
=== Early years ===
Mabel Terry-Lewis was born in London, the youngest of the five children, four daughters, and one son, of Arthur James Lewis (1824–1901) and his wife, Kate (née) Terry. Lewis was a prosperous businessman, co-owner of the haberdashery firm of Lewis and Allenby, and an amateur painter, illustrator and musician. Before their marriage, Kate Terry had been a well-known actress; her younger siblings, Ellen, Marion, Florence and Fred all followed her into the acting profession. The Lewises had no wish for any of their daughters to act professionally, but amateur theatricals were encouraged when the children were young. The author Lewis Carroll was a friend of Arthur Lewis, and on 24 January 1883 he visited the family home, Moray Lodge, for a performance of a comedietta titled Lady Barbara's Birthday given by the Lewis children and those of Ellen Terry. Also present on that occasion was W. S. Gilbert. Carroll wrote of the event:

Edith [Craig] was clever (though not very articulate) and Katie [Terry-Lewis] distinctly good: then Teddie (Edward Gordon Craig) was very good, though a little given to rant: but Mabel was the gem of the whole thing. I never saw her equal among children, except Ellen Terry herself. She is a born actress.

It is perhaps little known that Mabel was also a painter of miniatures. Who's Who in 1935 recorded that she had exhibited miniatures at the Royal Academy, Grafton and New Galleries and at Liverpool, Glasgow and Manchester. One such miniature was of Minnie Terry aged 5 years, circa 1887, which can be seen at Smallhythe Place in Kent, now a National Trust property, but once the home of actress Ellen Terry who was briefly married to the painter George Frederic Watts. Two other examples are miniatures of the 'Silver King' George McCulloch and his wife who lived near Mabel's home in London; these were gifted to the Art Gallery of South Australia in Adelaide by McCulloch's widow in 1928.

Mabel was the only one of the four Terry-Lewis daughters to pursue a theatrical career. Her first appearance on the professional stage was at the Garrick Theatre, in January 1895, as Lucy Lorimer in "A Pair of Spectacles," with John Hare. The Times commented, "Miss Lewis ... is a tall, dark and graceful young lady, exhibiting few of the characteristics of the novice." The Manchester Guardian said that she "played the pretty little part with unaffected simplicity, and with more ease than might have been expected in a débutante".

At the Criterion in May 1897, she played Margaret Linfield in Threepenny Bits. In the same year she played Bianca in The Taming of the Shrew for the Oxford University Dramatic Society at Oxford. She was not seen again in London until April 1898, when she appeared at the Globe (now the Gielgud Theatre), in Hare's company, playing Mary Faber in The Master; the production attracted considerable attention because Kate Terry came briefly out of retirement to appear alongside her daughter. Although Kate had the lion's share of the press notices, Mabel was praised for a touching performance.

From then until 1904, Terry-Lewis had a successful stage career. She appeared at the Globe as Bella in School (January 1899), Blanche Haye in Ours (February 1899), Esther Eccles, Marie Wilton's old part, in a revival of Caste (March 1899), and created the role of Muriel Eden in The Gay Lord Quex (April 1899). In 1900 she toured in The Mistress of Craignairn and Gudgeons , and on her return to London she opened at the Strand in May 1900, as Gloria Clandon in You Never Can Tell, in which The Observer's reviewer considered her acting superior to Bernard Shaw's play. After playing in a succession of ephemeral costume dramas, ending with the role of Sylvia Fitzallen in My Lady of Rosedale, she retired from the stage on her marriage in 1904. Her only West End appearance during her marriage was in 1906, at her aunt Ellen Terry's jubilee celebration at Drury Lane, along with more than twenty other members of the Terry family.

Her marriage, to Captain (later Major) Ralph Cecil Batley, was a happy one, and she enjoyed her quiet life on his country estate in Dorset. Her young nephew, John Gielgud stayed there on occasions, and took part in the amateur dramatics she organised for the Women's Institute. Batley had to resign his commission in January 1917 because of ill health, and he died on 23 October 1917 aged 54. Writing in 1989 about his aunt, Gielgud was uncertain whether her return to the stage after being widowed was an outlet for her "boundless energies" or was for financial reasons.

=== Second stage career ===
Terry-Lewis made her reappearance on the stage at the Prince of Wales Theatre on 10 February 1920, when she played Lady Sarah Aldine in The Young Person in Pink, at a one-off charity matinée. Her return to the mainstream West End theatre was in April of the same year, in the role of Jane Stroud in " The Grain of Mustard Seed". The Times commented, "Miss Mabel Terry-Lewis, in the part of a grave, high-minded, somewhat désabusée patrician gives a performance of really exquisite beauty."

In 1923 she toured America with Cyril Maude and Lydia Bilbrook in If Winter Comes, playing at Chicago in April and New York in the autumn. During subsequent visits to the US she played for three seasons in such popular pieces as Aren't We All, Easy Virtue, and The Constant Wife. In the West End she appeared in new plays and revivals, including The Importance of Being Earnest as the formidable Lady Brackell to the John Worthing of Gielgud in 1930. The Times observed, "Mr Gielgud and Miss Terry-Lewis together are brilliant ... they have the supreme grace of always allowing Wilde to speak in his own voice." Gielgud thought her performance was superb, although she had no sense of humour and never understood why audiences found her Lady Bracknell funny.

Terry-Lewis's other plays included The Skin Game, Death Takes a Holiday, Dinner at Eight, The Admirable Crichton, Distinguished Gathering, Victoria Regina, They Came to a City and Lady Windermere's Fan. She also appeared in films, including The Scarlet Pimpernel (1934), The Third Clue (1934), Dishonour Bright (1936), The Squeaker (1937), Jamaica Inn (1939), The Adventures of Tartu (1943) and They Came to a City (1944).

She died in London in 1957, aged 85.

== Filmography ==
- Love Maggy (1921) - Lady Shelford
- Shirley (1922) - Mrs Prior
- Caste (1930) - Marquise
- The Third Clue (1934) - Mr. Fuller
- The Scarlet Pimpernel (1934) - Countess de Tournay
- Dishonour Bright (1936) - Lady Melbury
- The Squeaker (1937) - Mrs Stedman
- Stolen Life (1939) - Aunt Helen
- Jamaica Inn (1939) - Lady Beston
- The Adventures of Tartu (1943) - Mrs Stevenson
- They Came to a City (1944) - Lady Loxfield (final film role)

== See also ==
- Terry family
