= Her Nameless Child =

1915 film by A. V. Bramble, Fred Groves and M. Gray Murray

Her Nameless Child is a 1915 British silent drama film directed by A. V. Bramble, Fred Groves and M. Gray Murray. It was based on a play by Madge Duckworth.

== Cast ==
- A. V. Bramble as Lord Harry Woodville
- Fred Groves as Arthur Ford
- M. Gray Murray as Earl of Richborough
- Elisabeth Risdon as Phyllis / Alice Ford
