= From Shopgirl to Duchess =

1915 film by Maurice Elvey

From Shopgirl to Duchess is a 1915 British silent drama film directed by Maurice Elvey and starring A. V. Bramble, Gertrude Evans and Fred Groves.

== Cast ==
- A. V. Bramble - Gilbert Spate
- Gertrude Evans - Lady Delamere
- Fred Groves - Duke of St. Baynum
- M. Gray Murray - Lard Camperdown
- Pauline Peters - Girl
- Elisabeth Risdon - Sylvia Gray
- Hilda Sims - Gertrude Haynes
- Dolly Tree - Tilly
- Jack Webster
