= A Master of Craft =

1922 film directed by Thomas Bentley

- Directed by: Thomas Bentley
- Written by: Eliot Stannard
- Based on: A Master of Craft by W. W. Jacobs
- Starring: Fred Groves; Mercy Hatton; Judd Green; Arthur Cleave
- Production company: Ideal Film Company
- Distributed by: Ideal Film Company
- Release date: 1922
- Country: United Kingdom
- Language: English

A Master of Craft is a 1922 British silent comedy film directed by Thomas Bentley and starring Fred Groves, Mercy Hatton and Judd Green. It was based on a 1900 novel by W. W. Jacobs.

== Cast ==
- Fred Groves – Captain Flower
- Mercy Hatton – Matilda Tapping
- Judd Green – George
- Arthur Cleave – Joe
- John Kelt – Green
- Roy Byford – Pat
- F. Pope Stamper – Mate
- Lilian Douglas
- Jerrold Robertshaw
- Eva Westlake
- Ian Wilson
