= Don Quixote (1923 film) =

1923 British film by Maurice Elvey

- Directed by: Maurice Elvey
- Screenplay by: Sinclair Hill
- Based on: Don Quixote by Miguel de Cervantes
- Release date: December 1923
- Running time: 50 minutes
- Country: United Kingdom

Don Quixote is a 1923 British silent comedy film, directed by Maurice Elvey, based on the novel Don Quixote by Miguel de Cervantes. The film stars Jerrold Robertshaw, George Robey, Frank Arlton, and Marie Blanche.

== Cast ==
- Jerrold Robertshaw as Don Quixote
- George Robey as Sancho Panza
- Frank Arlton as Father Perez
- Marie Blanche as The Housekeeper
- Bertram Burleigh as Sanson Carrasc
- Adeline Hayden Coffin as The Duchess
- Sydney Fairbrother as Tereza
- Minna Leslie as Dulcinea
- Edward O'Neill as The Duke
