= Jobson's Luck =

1913 film

Jobson's Luck is a 1913 British comedy film, directed by H.O. Martinek and starring George Foley, Hal Charlton and M. Gray Murray.

== Cast ==
- George Foley - Jobson
- Hal Charlton - Gilbert Fanshawe
- M. Gray Murray - Mr. Fanshawe
- Violet Graham - Girl
- Lettie Paxton - Girl
