= Mother Love (1916 film) =

1916 film

- Directed by: Maurice Elvey
- Written by: Kenelm Foss
- Starring: Elisabeth Risdon; Fred Groves; Frank Stanmore
- Production company: London Film Company
- Distributed by: Jury Films
- Release date: 1916
- Running time: 50 minutes
- Country: United Kingdom
- Languages: Silent; English intertitles

Mother Love is a 1916 British silent drama film directed by Maurice Elvey starring Elisabeth Risdon, Fred Groves, and Frank Stanmore.

== Cast ==
- Elisabeth Risdon as Mary
- Fred Groves as Alfie
- Frank Stanmore
- Guy Newall
- Dolly Tree

== Bibliography ==
- Murphy, Robert. Directors in British and Irish Cinema: A Reference Companion. British Film Institute, 2006.
