= The Suicide Club (1914 film) =

1914 film

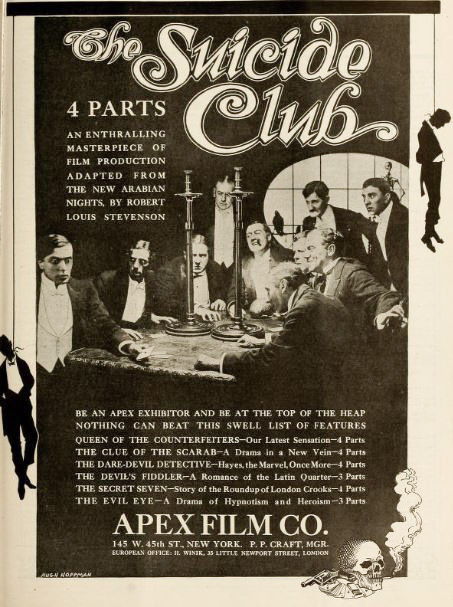

The Suicide Club is a 1914 British silent drama film directed by Maurice Elvey and starring Montagu Love, Elisabeth Risdon, and Fred Groves. It was based on the 1878 short story cycle of the same name by Robert Louis Stevenson.

== Partial cast ==
- Montagu Love as Prince Florizel
- Elisabeth Risdon as Zephyrine
- Fred Groves as President
- M. Gray Murray as Colonel Geraldine
- Frederick Culley as Captain Geraldine
