= Her Luck in London =

1914 film by Maurice Elvey

Her Luck in London is a 1914 British silent drama film directed by Maurice Elvey and starring A. V. Bramble, Fred Groves and M. Gray Murray. It was based on a play of the same name by Charles Darrell. The film follows a naive country girl as she heads to London, where she is corrupted.

== Cast ==
- A. V. Bramble - Honourable Gerald O'Connor
- Fred Groves - Richard Lenowen
- M. Gray Murray - Stephen Harbourne
- Elisabeth Risdon - Nellie Harbourne
