= Dombey and Son (film) =

1917 British film by Maurice Elvey

- Directed by: Maurice Elvey
- Written by: Charles Dickens (novel); Eliot Stannard
- Produced by: Fred Paul; Maurice Elvey
- Starring: Norman McKinnel; Lilian Braithwaite; Hayford Hobbs; Douglas Munro
- Production company: Ideal Film Company
- Distributed by: Ideal Film Company
- Release date: 1917
- Running time: 60 minutes
- Country: United Kingdom
- Language: English

Dombey and Son is a 1917 British silent drama film directed by Maurice Elvey and starring Norman McKinnel, Lilian Braithwaite and Hayford Hobbs. It is an adaptation of the 1848 novel Dombey and Son by Charles Dickens. A copy of the American release version is held by the George Eastman Museum.

== Plot ==
The dream of Paul Dombey, the wealthy owner of the shipping company, is to have a son to continue his business. Tragically, Dombey's wife dies shortly after giving birth to their son.

== Cast ==
- Norman McKinnel — Paul Dombey
- Lilian Braithwaite — Edith Dombey
- Hayford Hobbs — Walter Dombey
- Mary Odette — Florence Dombey
- Douglas Munro — Solomon Gillis
- Jerrold Robertshaw — Carker
- Fewlass Llewellyn — Bagstock
- Will Corrie — Captain Scuttle
- Evelyn Walsh Hall — Mrs. Skenton
