= When London Sleeps =

1932 film

- Directed by: Leslie S. Hiscott
- Written by: Charles Darrell; H. Fowler Mear; Bernard Merivale
- Starring: Harold French; Francis L. Sullivan; René Ray
- Cinematography: Basil Emmott
- Edited by: Jack Harris
- Distributed by: AP&D
- Release date: 13 July 1932
- Running time: 78 minutes
- Country: United Kingdom
- Language: English

When London Sleeps is a 1932 British crime film directed by Leslie S. Hiscott and starring Harold French, Francis L. Sullivan, Diana Beaumont and René Ray. It was filmed at Twickenham Studios in west London. It was written by H. Fowler Mear and Bernard Merivale based on the play of the same title by Charles Darrell.

== Premise ==
A well-born gambler comes to the rescue of a travelling circus in financial difficulties.

== Cast ==
- Harold French as Tommy Blythe
- Francis L. Sullivan as Rodney Haines
- René Ray as Mary
- A. Bromley Davenport as Colonel Grahame
- Alexander Field as Sam
- Diana Beaumont as Hilde
- Ben Field as Lamberti
- Barbara Everest as Mme Lamberti
- Herbert Lomas as Pollard
- James Knight as Garnett

== Reception ==
Kine Weekly wrote: "Harold French is good as Tommy and behaves as a hero should. Rene Ray is adequate as Mary; Francis L. Sullivan gives a clever performance as the unscrupulous Haines; while Alexander Field and Ben Field are responsible for two excellent character studies. Virtue triumphs over vice in this picture in the accepted manner, and the working out of the plot certainly leads to variety, if not to the unexpected. ... There are times when the action is on the slow side, but once the stage is set for the fire things warm up considerably, and the proceedings end on a hectic, thrilling and satisfying note."
