= Esther (1916 film) =

- Directed by: Maurice Elvey
- Written by: Maurice Elvey
- Starring: Elisabeth Risdon; Fred Groves; Charles Rock
- Production company: London Films
- Distributed by: Jury Films
- Release date: January 1916
- Country: United Kingdom
- Languages: Silent; English intertitles

Esther is a 1916 British silent historical film directed by Maurice Elvey and starring Elisabeth Risdon, Fred Groves and Charles Rock. The film portrays the biblical story of Esther.

== Cast ==
- Elisabeth Risdon as Esther
- Fred Groves as Haman
- Charles Rock as Mordecai
- Ruth Mackay as Vashti
- Franklin Dyall
- Guy Newall
- Beatrix Templeton

== Bibliography ==
- Murphy, Robert. Directors in British and Irish Cinema: A Reference Companion. British Film Institute, 2006.
