= Home (1915 film) =

- Directed by: Maurice Elvey
- Written by: Maurice Elvey
- Starring: Elisabeth Risdon; Fred Groves; A. V. Bramble
- Production companies: British & Colonial Kinematograph Company
- Distributed by: Ashley Films
- Release date: September 1915
- Country: United Kingdom
- Languages: Silent; English intertitles

Home is a 1915 British silent drama film directed by Maurice Elvey and starring Elisabeth Risdon, Fred Groves and A. V. Bramble. A poor girl discovers she is really a Duke's daughter, but eventually returns to her own family of fishermen.

== Cast ==
- Elisabeth Risdon as Joan Bicester
- Fred Groves as Steven Armitage
- A. V. Bramble as Dan
- M. Gray Murray as Duke
- Compton Coutts
- Clarence Derwent
- Pauline Peters
- Joyce Templeton

== Bibliography ==
- Murphy, Robert. Directors in British and Irish Cinema: A Reference Companion. British Film Institute, 2006.
