= Sidney Northcote =

British actor and director (1884–1952)

Sidney Webber Northcote (26 October 1884 – 1952) was an English actor and film director.

== Personal life ==
He was born in Seaforth, Liverpool, Lancashire (now Seaforth, Merseyside) on 26 October 1884. He married Kathleen Kerr in Manchester in 1921; they had 3 sons. He died in London in 1952.

== Career ==
He was the director of 14 silent films, made between 1912 and 1914. He also appeared as an actor in 7 short films shot on location in Wales and Cornwall that he directed in 1912 for the British and Colonial Kinematograph Company. All of them were scripted by Harold Brett and featured Dorothy Foster in the starring role. None is known to have survived.

1912

- The Witch of the Welsh Mountains (Plot: "A wounded widow recovers in time to save the 'wrong girl' from being burned at the stake"}
- The Smuggler's Daughter of Anglesea
- The Belle of Bettwys-y Coed
- The Pedlar of Penmaenmawr
- The Fishergirl of Cornwall
- A Cornish Romance
- A Tragedy on the Cornish Coast
- Through Death's Valley
- Saved by Fire

1913

- Adventures of Pimple

1914

- The Troubles of an Heiress (Vera Northcote as "The Kandy Kid")
- The King of Crime
- Detective Daring and the Thames Coiners
- Mary the Fishergirl

1915

- The Monkey's Paw

From a story by W.W. Jacobs, starring John Lawson as John White. White is shown a strange monkey's paw that will grant three wishes. He steals it from his friend, and learns that you must be careful what you wish for.

1927

- In July 1927, Northcote appeared as Amiens and as Jacques in a production of Shakespeare's 'As You Like It' in Cardiff, Wales.

1932

- In 1932, he produced what appears to have been his final film, Verdict of the Sea (Plot: "A ship's captain plans on delivering some gems to their rightful owner; a gang of malcontents plots to grab the diamonds for themselves. Thanks to the help of a former doctor, the plot is foiled.")

== Sources ==
- A Critical History of British Cinema. Roy Armes. Oxford University Press, New York, (1978)
- Directors and Their Films 1895 - 1990. Brooks Bushnell. McFarland and Co. Jefferson NC & London (1993)
- The Illustrated Who's Who in British Films. Dennis Gifford. Anchor Press, London (1978)
- Matthew Sweet, The Guardian, 8 April 2011
