= Flames (1917 film) =

1917 film by Maurice Elvey

Flames is a 1917 British silent drama film directed by Maurice Elvey and starring Margaret Bannerman, Owen Nares and Edward O'Neill. It is based on an 1897 novel by Robert Hichens. It follows the experiments of a strange occultist.

== Cast ==
- Margaret Bannerman - Cuckoo
- Owen Nares - Valentine Creswell
- Edward O'Neill - Richard Marr
- Douglas Munro - Doctor Levetier
- Clifford Cobbe - Julian Addison
