= The Victory Leaders =

- Directed by: Maurice Elvey
- Release date: 1919
- Country: United Kingdom
- Languages: Silent; English intertitles

The Victory Leaders is a 1919 British silent documentary film directed by Maurice Elvey. The film portrayed the events surrounding the Allied victory in the First World War.

== Bibliography ==
- Low, Rachael; Manvell, Roger (1971). The History of the British Film: 1918-1929. Allen & Unwin. ISBN 978-0-04-791021-0.
