= A Will of Her Own =

- Directed by: Maurice Elvey
- Written by: Maurice Elvey
- Starring: Elisabeth Risdon; Fred Groves; Hilda Sims
- Production company: London Films
- Distributed by: Jury Films
- Release date: November 1915
- Country: United Kingdom
- Languages: Silent; English intertitles

A Will of Her Own is a 1915 British silent drama film directed by Maurice Elvey and starring Elisabeth Risdon, Fred Groves and Hilda Sims.

== Premise ==
A woman marries a doctor, but leaves him to pursue a career on the stage. Eventually they are reunited.

== Cast ==
- Elisabeth Risdon as Isabel Stanton
- Fred Groves as Dr. Blake
- Hilda Sims
- Ernest A. Cox
- Dolly Tree

== Bibliography ==
- Murphy, Robert. Directors in British and Irish Cinema: A Reference Companion. British Film Institute, 2006.
