= The Swindler (film) =

1919 film by Maurice Elvey

The Swindler is a 1919 British silent drama film directed by Maurice Elvey and starring Cecil Humphreys, Marjorie Hume and Neville Percy. It was based on a short story by Ethel M. Dell.

== Cast ==
- Cecil Humphreys - Nat Verney
- Marjorie Hume - Cynthia Mortimer
- Neville Percy - Archie Mortimer
- Teddy Arundell - Inspector West
- Allan Hunter - Lord Babbacombe
