= The Veteran of Waterloo =

1933 film

- Directed by: A. V. Bramble
- Based on: A Story of Waterloo by Arthur Conan Doyle
- Produced by: Harry Rowson
- Starring: Jerrold Robertshaw; Roger Livesey; Joan Kemp-Welch
- Production company: National Talkies
- Distributed by: Paramount British Pictures
- Release date: 1933
- Running time: 48 minutes
- Country: United Kingdom
- Language: English

The Veteran of Waterloo is a 1933 British short drama film directed by A. V. Bramble and starring Jerrold Robertshaw, Roger Livesey and Joan Kemp-Welch. The screenplay concerns an old soldier who recounts his participation in the 1815 Battle of Waterloo. It is based on the 1894 play A Story of Waterloo by Arthur Conan Doyle. It was produced as a quota quickie for distribution by Paramount Pictures.

== Cast ==
- Jerrold Robertshaw as Corporal Gregory Brewster
- Roger Livesey as Sergeant MacDonald
- Joan Kemp-Welch as Norah Brewster
- A. B. Imeson as Colonel
- Minnie Rayner as Neighbour

== Bibliography ==
- Chibnall, Steve. Quota Quickies: The Birth of the British 'B' Film. British Film Institute, 2007.
- Low, Rachael. Filmmaking in 1930s Britain. George Allen & Unwin, 1985.
- Wood, Linda. British Films, 1927-1939. British Film Institute, 1986.
