= Charity Ann =

1915 British film by Maurice Elvey

- Directed by: Maurice Elvey
- Written by: Chappell Dossett
- Starring: Elisabeth Risdon; Fred Groves; Chappell Dossett
- Production company: London Films
- Distributed by: Jury Films
- Release date: November 1915
- Country: United Kingdom
- Languages: Silent; English intertitles

Charity Ann is a 1915 British silent drama film directed by Maurice Elvey and starring Elisabeth Risdon, Fred Groves and Chappell Dossett.

== Cast ==
- Elisabeth Risdon as Ann Charity
- Fred Groves as Graham Trevor
- Chappell Dossett as Prof. Woolsey
- Winifred Sadler

== Bibliography ==
- Murphy, Robert. Directors in British and Irish Cinema: A Reference Companion. British Film Institute, 2006.
