= Love in a Wood =

1915 film by Maurice Elvey

- Directed by: Maurice Elvey
- Written by: William Shakespeare (play); Kenelm Foss
- Starring: Gerald Ames; Elisabeth Risdon; Kenelm Foss
- Production company: London Films
- Distributed by: Jury Films
- Release date: November 1915
- Country: United Kingdom
- Languages: Silent; English intertitles

Love in a Wood is a 1915 British silent comedy film directed by Maurice Elvey and starring Gerald Ames, Elisabeth Risdon and Kenelm Foss. The film is a contemporary-set version of William Shakespeare's play As You Like It. ”As its title suggests, this film is significant as one of the earliest modern-dress versions of screened Shakespeare.”

== Cast ==
- Gerald Ames as Orlando
- Vera Cuningham as Celia
- Kenelm Foss as Oliver
- Cyril Percival
- Elisabeth Risdon as Rosalind
- Frank Stanmore as Touchstone
- Dolly Tree

== Bibliography ==
- Murphy, Robert. Directors in British and Irish Cinema: A Reference Companion. British Film Institute, 2006.
