= Maria Marten, or the Mystery of the Red Barn =

1913 film

- Directed by: Maurice Elvey
- Written by: Maurice Elvey
- Produced by: Motograph Film Company
- Starring: Elisabeth Risdon; Fred Groves; Douglas Payne; Nessie Blackford; A. G. Ogden; Mary McKenzie; Maurice Elvey
- Distributed by: Motograph Film Company
- Release date: December 1913
- Running time: 3 reels; 869 feet
- Country: United Kingdom
- Language: Silent

Maria Marten, or the Mystery of the Red Barn is a 1913 British silent drama film directed by Maurice Elvey. It was based on the 1827 Red Barn Murder. The story of Maria Marten was a popular stage melodrama of the Victorian era, and five films based on the story were made between 1902 and 1935.

As of August 2010, the film is missing from the BFI National Archive, and is listed as one of the British Film Institute's "75 Most Wanted" lost films.

== Plot ==
A Suffolk squire murders a young pregnant woman who had demanded that he must marry her.

== Cast ==
- Elisabeth Risdon as Maria Marten
- Fred Groves as William Corder
- Douglas Payne as Roger Deaves
- Nessie Blackford as Mary Marten
- A. G. Ogden as Tom Marten
- Mary McKenzie as Mary Moore
- Maurice Elvey as Captain Matthews

== See also ==
- List of lost films
