= Bonnie Mary =

1918 British film by A. V. Bramble

Bonnie Mary is a 1918 British silent romance film directed by A. V. Bramble and starring Miriam Ferris, Lionel Belcher, and Arthur M. Cullin.

== Premise ==
Two feuding Scottish families are united when their children fall in love.

== Cast ==
- Miriam Ferris - Mary Douglas
- Lionel Belcher - Rob McAllister
- Arthur M. Cullin - Andrew Douglas
- Jeff Barlow - James McAllister
- Elaine Madison - Jeannie Douglas
