= The Third Clue =

1934 film

- Directed by: Albert Parker
- Written by: Michael Barringer; Lance Sieveking; Frank Atkinson
- Based on: novel The Shakespeare Murders by Neil Gordon
- Produced by: Ernest Gartside
- Starring: Molly Lamontn; Basil Sydney; Raymond Lovell
- Cinematography: Robert G. Martin; James Wilson
- Edited by: Reginald Beck
- Production company: Fox-British Pictures
- Distributed by: Fox Film Company
- Release date: 15 April 1935
- Running time: 72 minutes
- Country: United Kingdom
- Language: English

The Third Clue is a 1934 British crime film directed by Albert Parker and starring Basil Sydney, Molly Lamont and Raymond Lovell. It was written by Michael Barringer, Lance Sieveking and Frank Atkinson based on Neil Gordon's 1933 novel The Shakespeare Murders, which also inspired The Claydon Treasure Mystery (1938).

== Synopsis ==
Two criminals try to recover loot hidden in an isolated manor house.

== Cast ==
- Basil Sydney as Reinhardt Conway
- Molly Lamont as Rosemary Clayton
- Robert Cochran as Peter Kerrigan
- Alfred Sangster as Rupert Clayton
- C. M. Hallard as Gabriel Wells
- Raymond Lovell as Robinson, the butler
- Adela Mavis as Zeta
- Frank Atkinson as Lefty
- Ernest Sefton as Newman
- Ian Fleming as Mark Clayton
- Bruce Lester as Derek Clayton
- Mabel Terry-Lewis as Mrs. Fuller

== Production ==
The film was made at Wembley Studios as a quota quickie by the British subsidiary of 20th Century Fox.

== Reception ==
Kine Weekly wrote: "Production and acting are satisfactory, but cannot overcome a complicated and highly improbable story: defects which limit the picture strictly to quota value."

The Daily Film Renter wrote: "Lurid melodrama dealing with master crook's attempts to secure jewels stolen from Indian idol. Developed on lines of 'penny dreadful,' film resolves into hotch potch of confusing episodes reminiscent of old-time chapter play. Conviction is swept by the board, sliding doors, blackjacking, man in packing case, and other trappings of highly coloured nature being characteristic ingredients. Quota supporting feature for indulgent patrons."
