= Driven (1916 film) =

1916 British film by Maurice Elvey

- Directed by: Maurice Elvey
- Written by: E. Temple Thurston (play); Maurice Elvey
- Starring: Elisabeth Risdon; Fred Groves; Guy Newall
- Production company: London Films
- Distributed by: Jury Films
- Release date: 1916
- Country: United Kingdom
- Languages: Silent; English intertitles

Driven is a 1916 British silent drama film directed by Maurice Elvey and starring Elisabeth Risdon, Fred Groves and Guy Newall. The film is based on the play The Evolution of Katherine by E. Temple Thurston. After learning she hasn't long to live, a woman begins an affair.

== Cast ==
- Elisabeth Risdon as Katherine Crichton
- Fred Groves as John Staffurth
- Guy Newall as Richard Furness
- Henrietta Watson as Lady Crichton
- Hugh Croise as Mr. Crichton

== Bibliography ==
- Murphy, Robert. Directors in British and Irish Cinema: A Reference Companion. British Film Institute, 2006.
