= Jean Aylwin =

Scottish actress and singer (1885–1964)

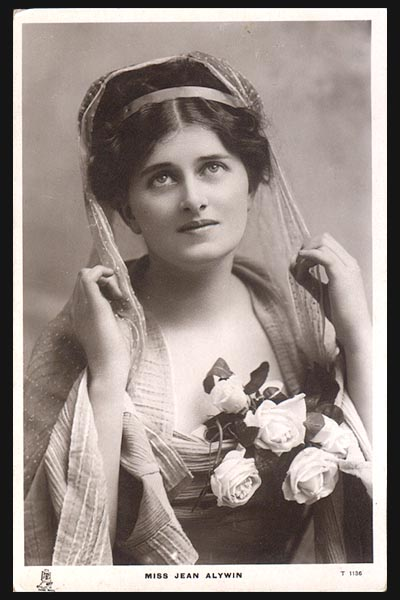
Jean Aylwin in Havana

Jean Aylwin (10 October 1885 – 1964), also known as Jean Isabella Griffin Aitkin, was a Scottish actress and singer, often billed as "The Lady Harry Lauder".

Aylwin was best known for creating character roles in successful Edwardian musical comedies early in the 20th century. She turned to roles in non-musical plays by World War I, continued to act into the 1920s and was later a radio broadcaster. Her divorce in 1924 from a colonel in the Intelligence Corps involved allegations of infidelity.

== Early life and career ==
Aylwin was born in Hawick and was educated at George Watsons College, Edinburgh.

She began her professional stage career in 1904 with a touring company playing character roles in smaller towns in the British provinces in such melodramas as The Red Coat and No Cross, No Crown. She later toured with a company managed by George Dance as a shop assistant in the Edwardian musical comedy The Girl from Kays, and next was engaged at the Gaiety Theatre, in the chorus. She soon became an understudy there and made her London principal debut in the same theatre, as Sylvana in the long-running musical comedy The Spring Chicken in 1906. George Grossmith, Jr. also appeared in the piece, and over the next four years, Aylwin would play in a series of successful musicals co-written by, and starring, Grossmith. Later the same year, she played Jennie, a maid in the original cast of the first of these, The New Aladdin. A reviewer from The Daily Mail wrote that if she fulfilled her early promise, she "has a future before her as character actress that can best be described as a particularly bright one." In 1907, she took the role of Minna in the original run of the hit musical The Girls of Gottenberg. The following year, she performed as Anita in Havana, and in 1909 appeared in Our Miss Gibbs. When Our Miss Gibbs transferred to the Knickerbocker Theatre, New York, in 1910, Aylwin went with it, joining a mostly American cast.

By 1912, she was back in England starring in A Scrape O' the Pen, by Graham Moffat, at the Comedy Theatre. One reviewer opined, "Jean Aylwin has joined the company, and she was far more at home in the part of Jean Lowther than in a musical comedy role." The following year, she starred in Who's the Lady at the Garrick Theatre. A reviewer commented: "Jean Aylwin, who was altogether charming as Gobette, had no difficulty in showing what an accomplished actress this most outrageous of flirts was. Her delicate art, indeed, all but transmuted base metal into pure gold." The show's success was later described by another critic as "in no small degree due to the brilliant acting of Miss Jean Aylwin".

In 1913–14, she appeared in Scotland and northern England as the title character in a show with a Scottish theme, A Careless Lassie. The Dundee Courier praised the story of a girl from a rigidly righteous (unco guid) family, who runs away to the music hall stage and then returns, but the Manchester Courier's review lamented that the show's own music hall format gave limited scope to 'clever players' from the 'legitimate' theatre, such as Aylwin. In 1914 she received press coverage for inspiring a style of dress "in crepe and lace". In 1915, she starred in a second Scottish-themed show, All Scotch. The show was described as a "tartan revue" and culminated in a sequence in which Aylwin appeared as Bonnie Prince Charlie. The Manchester Courier described the revue as "probably one of the best which has been to Manchester" and commended the wit and humour, observing that Aylwin "sings and dances charmingly". Later that year, she supported the comedian Dan Rolyat in his revue She's a Daisy, at the Manchester Hippodrome, and performed in benefit concerts to support the war effort. In February 1916, All Scotch was revived at Her Majesty's Theatre, Dundee, where Aylwin's part was again praised as "charming" by the press.

== Later years ==
In 1918, Aylwin appeared in the silent film The Greatest Wish in the World as the Mother Superior. In the same year, she starred in a sketch called Something to his Advantage, written for her by Dion Titheradge, at the Euston Theatre and the Coventry Hippodrome. A reviewer remarked that "There may not be much of a 'plot', but there is sufficient to bring out the remarkably fine qualities of Miss Aylwin". In 1920, she appeared in Just Like a Woman at the Glasgow Empire.

In 1923 she returned to the stage in one of two competing London versions of Polly at the Chelsea Theatre, London. Her role as a Scottish maid was newly introduced for the Chelsea production and does not appear in the original. At the end of that year she announced her permanent retirement from the stage. She stated that she intended to travel to India and other parts of the East, to work with the Wesleyan Missionary Society to improve conditions in leper settlements. She subsequently returned to England, and in 1926 was an early radio broadcaster on the BBC with a programme of "Scotch Tales and Songs".

== Personal life ==
On 13 December 1913, Aylwin married Lieutenant-Colonel Alfred Rawlinson, son of Sir Henry Rawlinson, the famed Assyriologist. They were divorced in 1924; the composer Hubert Bath was named as co-respondent in the case. The court heard that while she had been appearing in Polly, she had asked her husband to rent a flat for her opposite the theatre. When he went to visit her there, he encountered Mr Bath. On learning that his wife was too ill to come out, Rawlinson invited Bath out to lunch, who declined, claiming a prior engagement. Rawlinson returned to the flat later, where he again met Bath. When Bath went to ask Aylwin if she was well enough to receive her husband, Rawlinson heard her ask "Has he gone?" which aroused his suspicions about Bath's presence. Aylwin wrote to her husband afterwards, saying he was "quite wrong", and that Bath had been "a good friend". However, the housekeeper testified that Aylwin and Bath had often been alone together at the flat. The court found for Colonel Rawlinson and granted the divorce.
