= The Greatest Wish in the World =

1918 film by Maurice Elvey

The Greatest Wish in the World is a 1918 British silent romance film directed by Maurice Elvey and starring Bransby Williams, Mary Odette and Edward Combermere. It was adapted from a novel by E. Temple Thurston.

== Cast ==
- Bransby Williams - Father O'Leary
- Mary Odette - Peggy
- Edward Combermere - Stephen Gale
- Ada King - Mrs. Parfitt
- Douglas Munro - Pinches
- Gwynne Herbert - Mrs. Gooseberry
- Jean Aylwin - Mother Superior
- Teddy Arundell
- Will Corrie
