= The Princess of Happy Chance =

1917 film by Maurice Elvey

The Princess of Happy Chance is a 1917 British silent romance film directed by Maurice Elvey and starring Elisabeth Risdon, Gerald Ames and Hayford Hobbs. The screenplay concerns a Princess who tries to avoid an upcoming marriage. It was based on the 1915 novel by Tom Gallon.

== Premise ==
To avoid an upcoming marriage she is unhappy with a Princess swaps places with a woman who looks identical to her.

== Cast ==
- Elisabeth Risdon as Princess Felicia / Lucidora Eden
- Gerald Ames as Harvey Royle
- Hayford Hobbs as Michael Berland
- Dallas Cairns as Prince Jocelyn
- Douglas Munro as Josiah Buckworthy
- Gwynne Herbert
- Edna Maude
- Cyril Percival
- Janet Ross
- Beatrix Templeton
