= Gilbert Dying to Die =

- Directed by: Maurice Elvey
- Written by: Maurice Elvey
- Starring: Fred Groves
- Production companies: British & Colonial Kinematograph Company
- Release date: February 1915
- Country: United Kingdom
- Languages: Silent; English intertitles

Gilbert Dying to Die is a 1915 British silent short comedy film directed by Maurice Elvey and starring Fred Groves. A drunken man named Gilbert attempts to commit suicide and fails. He then discovers that he has inherited a fortune. Another film portraying the same character Gilbert Gets Tiger-It is was also released the same year.

== Cast ==
- Fred Groves as Gilbert

== Bibliography ==
- Murphy, Robert. Directors in British and Irish Cinema: A Reference Companion. British Film Institute, 2006.
