= Jerrold Robertshaw =

British actor (1903–1991)

- Born: 28 March 1866; Allerton, West Riding of Yorkshire, England
- Died: 14 February 1941 (aged 74); London, England
- Occupation: Actor

Jerrold Robertshaw (28 March 1866, in Allerton, West Riding of Yorkshire – 14 February 1941, in London) was a British stage and film actor of the silent era.

== Selected filmography ==
- Dombey and Son (1917)
- Build Thy House (1920)
- The Bonnie Brier Bush (1921)
- A Master of Craft (1922)
- The Wandering Jew (1923)
- Should a Doctor Tell? (1923)
- A Royal Divorce (1923)
- Guy Fawkes (1923)
- Don Quixote (1923)
- The Arab (1924)
- The Sins Ye Do (1924)
- She (1925)
- The Apache (1925)
- A Royal Divorce (1926)
- Huntingtower (1927)
- Tommy Atkins (1928)
- Bolibar (1928)
- You Know What Sailors Are (1928)
- Palais de danse (1928)
- Glorious Youth (1929)
- Power Over Men (1929)
- The Inseparables (1929)
- The Shadow Between (1931)
- The Veteran of Waterloo (1933)
