= Charles Darrell =

English playwright (1859–1932)

Charles Darrell (29 June 1859 – 25 March 1932) was an English playwright who specialized in melodrama.

== Early life ==
Darrell was born in London, England.

== Selected works ==
His plays include:

- When London Sleeps: Charles Holloway's production at Theatre Royal, Melbourne in 1898; basis of the 1932 film When London Sleeps
- The Power and the Glory (1898); first Australian performance in 1899
- Defender of the Faith; first Australian production 1900
- Her Luck in London (1905); first Australian production 1906; basis of the 1914 film Her Luck in London
- What a Man Made Her (1909)
- A Girl's Good Luck (1912)
- In A Man's Grip (1913)
- The Millionaire and the Woman (1916)
- Should a Wife Refuse? (1917)
- Tommy's French Wife (1918)
- A Girl in the Web (1919)
- From Shopgirl to Duchess; first Australian production 1909; basis of the 1917 film From Shopgirl to Duchess
- The Girl Who Knew a Bit; Australian rights purchased by William Anderson 1911.
- The Idol of Paris, basis of the 1914 film The Idol of Paris, was also the English title of Sarah Bernhardt's autobiography.
- White as a Lily?; first Australian production 1913
- When Paris Sleeps (1913), first Australia production 1920; basis of the 1917 film When Paris Sleeps
