= Fine Feathers (1915 film) =

1915 film by Maurice Elvey

Fine Feathers is a 1915 British silent drama film directed by Maurice Elvey and starring Elisabeth Risdon, Fred Groves and Douglas Payne.

== Plot ==
After a blind man recovers his sight his average-looking wife undergoes a makeover in order to make herself more attractive to him.

== Cast ==
- Elisabeth Risdon - Meg Roberts
- Fred Groves - Richard Dean
- Douglas Payne - Dr. Beverley
- Daisy Cordell - Mrs. Beverley
- Kenelm Foss - Saxton
- Dolly Tree
