= Lilian Braithwaite =

English actress (1873–1948)

Dame Lilian Braithwaite DBE
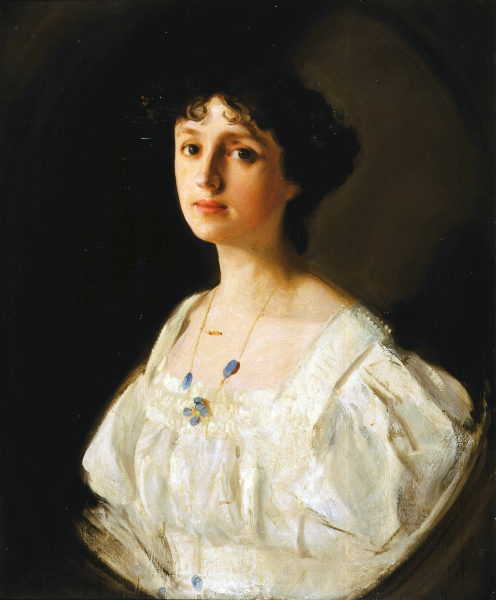
- by Charles Sims
- Born: Florence Lilian Braithwaite; 9 March 1873; Ramsgate, Kent, England
- Died: 17 September 1948 (aged 75); London, England
- Education: Croydon High School
- Occupation: Actress
- Years active: 1897–1948
- Spouse(s): Gerald Lawrence (m. 1897; div. 1905)
- Children: Joyce Carey

Dame Florence Lilian Braithwaite (9 March 1873 – 17 September 1948) was an English actress, primarily of the stage, although she appeared in both silent and talkie films.

== Early life ==
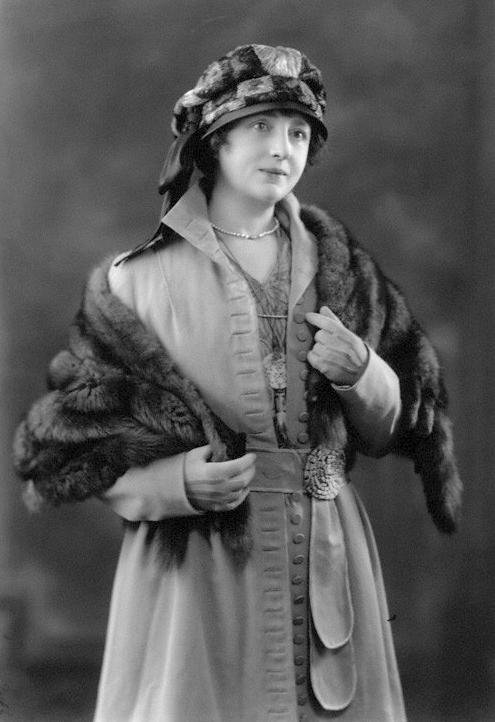
Lilian Braithwaite in 1921

Born 9 March 1873 in Ramsgate, Kent, the daughter of the Revd John Masterman Braithwaite (1846–1889), then a curate and later vicar of Croydon, and his wife, Elizabeth Jane, daughter of Colonel Thomas Sidney Powell, CB. Educated at Croydon High School, she was the eldest of seven children, having five brothers, two of whom—Colonel Francis Powell Braithwaite and Vice-Admiral Lawrence Walter Braithwaite—served with distinction in the military. Her sister Dorothy Louisa married Philip Maud.

Braithwaite first acted with amateur companies, including the Strolling Players and the Oxford University Dramatic Society, but her decision to turn professional was met with strong opposition from her parents. However, in 1897 at the age of 24, she joined the William Haviland and Gerald Lawrence Shakespearean company, making her first professional appearances in minor roles during a tour of South Africa in 1897. She had married Lawrence on 2 June 1897 at the church of St Stephen in Kensington in London, and their daughter, the actress Joyce Carey (1898–1993) was born on their return to London from South Africa. The couple divorced in 1905 following his adultery and desertion.

== Career ==
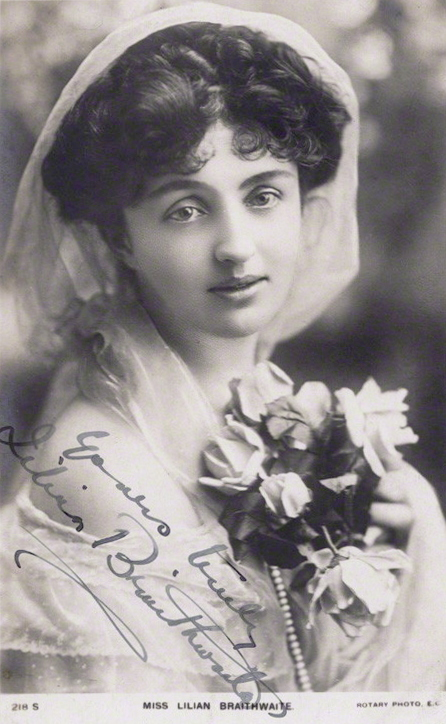
Braithwaite in early 1900s

Braithwaite made her first professional London appearance as Celia in As You Like It in 1900. Next, she appeared in Paul Kester's Sweet Nell of Old Drury at the Theatre Royal Haymarket. In 1901, she joined the company of Frank Benson and with him appeared in a season of the works of Shakespeare at the Comedy Theatre. She then toured with George Alexander and appeared under his management at the St James's Theatre from 1901 to 1904. In 1912, she appeared as the Madonna in C. B. Cochran's production of the mystery play The Miracle at Olympia while in 1913 she played Mrs Gregory in Mr. Wu. In 1921 she was Margaret Fairfield in A Bill of Divorcement by Clemence Dane.

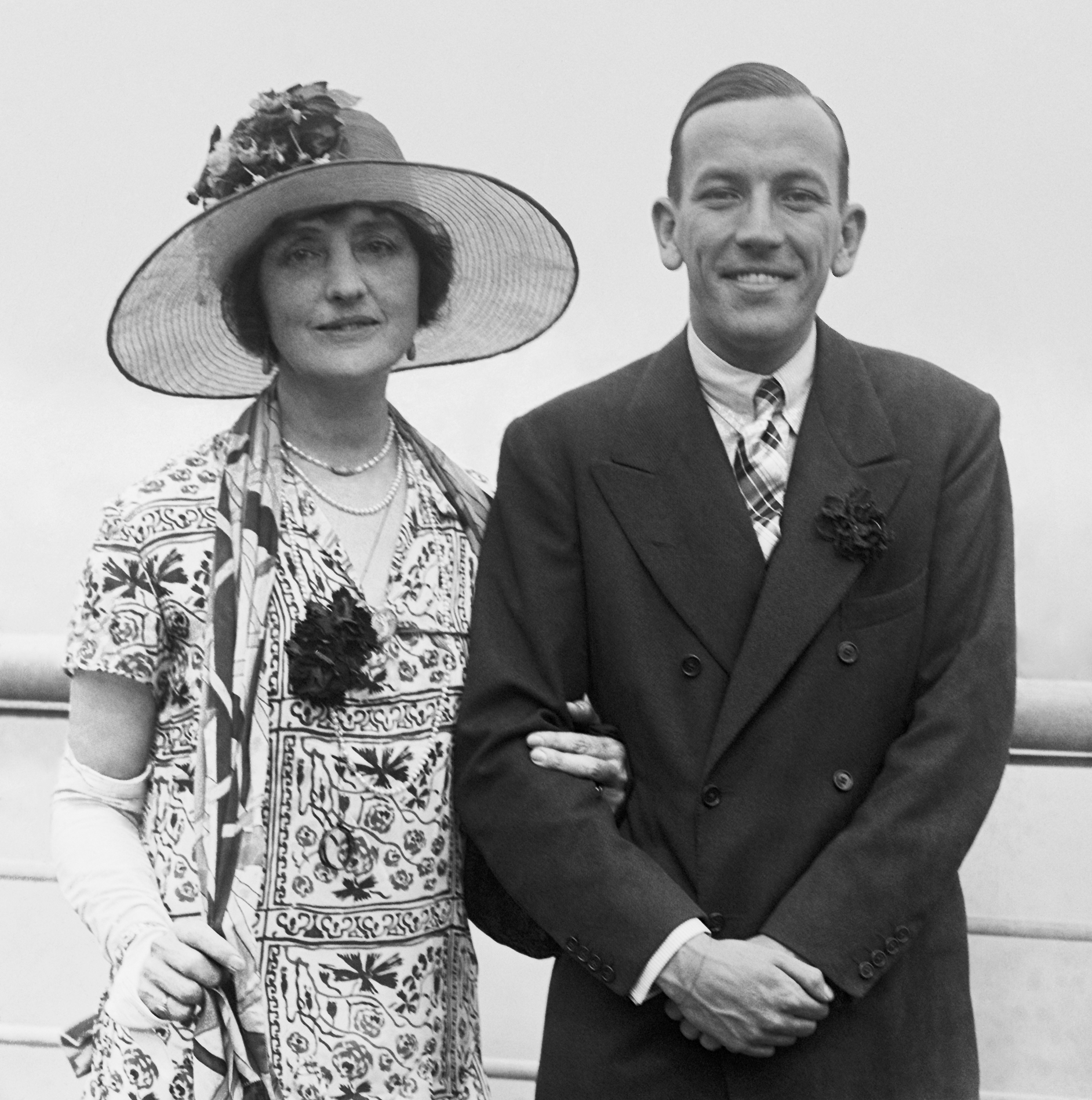
Braithwaite with Noël Coward, her co-star in The Vortex

Her greatest triumph was as the alcoholic mother in Noël Coward's ground-breaking drama The Vortex in 1924. She appeared in the 1927 Alfred Hitchcock film Downhill. Until then associated with tragic heroines, she proved that comedy was her greatest asset in a succession of drawing-room dramas and light comedies. In 1928, Braithwaite demonstrated her talent as a light comedienne when she played a 'ten per cent lady' in Ivor Novello's The Truth Game at the Globe Theatre. She went on to play in a succession of successful comedies, including Flat to Let, Fresh Fields (1933), Family Affairs, Full House, The Lady of La Paz and Bats in the Belfry. However, she did not turn her back on more serious roles when she played the title role in Elizabeth, la femme sans homme at the Haymarket Theatre (1938) and Lady Mountstephan in A House in the Square (1940) at St Martin's Theatre.

In 1940, during World War II, Braithwaite served as chairman and chief organiser of the hospital division of Entertainments National Service Association (ENSA) and in 1943 she was appointed a Dame Commander of the Order of the British Empire (DBE), for services to the stage. She returned to comedy in Arsenic and Old Lace in December 1942 which played for three years. Her last known notable performance was as Mrs. Armitage in the film A Man About the House (1947).

Braithwaite responded to the assertion of critic James Agate that she was "the second most beautiful woman in London" by replying, "I shall long cherish that, coming from our second-best theatre critic."

Dame Lilian Braithwaite died in London on 17 September 1948, in the belief that her illness was temporary and that soon she would be rehearsing a new play.

== Selected filmography ==
- The World's Desire (1915)
- Justice (1917)
- Dombey and Son (1917)
- The Gay Lord Quex (1917)
- Because (1918)
- Castles in Spain (1920)
- Mary Find the Gold (1921)
- A Man of Mayfair (1931)
- The Chinese Puzzle (1932)
- Moscow Nights (1935)
- A Man About the House (1947)
