= The Scarlet Pimpernel (1934 film) =

1934 British adventure film directed by Harold Young

- theatrical release lobby card
- Directed by: Harold Young
- Written by: Scenario, continuity & dialogue: Lajos Bíró; S. N. Behrman; Robert E. Sherwood; Arthur Wimperis; Baroness Emmuska Orczy (uncredited); Alexander Korda; Rowland Brown (contributing writers, uncredited)
- Based on: The Scarlet Pimpernel 1905 play by Baroness Orczy and Montagu Barstow; The Scarlet Pimpernel 1905 novel by Baroness Orczy
- Produced by: Alexander Korda
- Starring: Leslie Howard; Merle Oberon; Raymond Massey
- Cinematography: Harold Rosson
- Edited by: William Hornbeck
- Music by: Arthur Benjamin
- Production company: London Films
- Distributed by: United Artists
- Release dates: 23 December 1934 (UK); 7 February 1935 (U.S.)
- Running time: 94 minutes
- Country: United Kingdom
- Language: English
- Budget: £81,000
- Box office: £420,000

The Scarlet Pimpernel is a 1934 British adventure film starring Leslie Howard, Merle Oberon, and Raymond Massey. It was directed by Harold Young and produced by Alexander Korda. Based on the 1905 play by Baroness Orczy and Montagu Barstow and the 1905 adventure novel by Orczy, the film is about an 18th-century English aristocrat (Howard) who leads a double life, passing himself off as an effete aristocrat while engaged in a secret effort to rescue French nobles from Robespierre's Reign of Terror. Howard's portrayal of the title character is often considered the definitive portrayal of the role. In 1941, he played a similar role in "Pimpernel" Smith but this time set in pre-WWII Germany.

== Plot ==
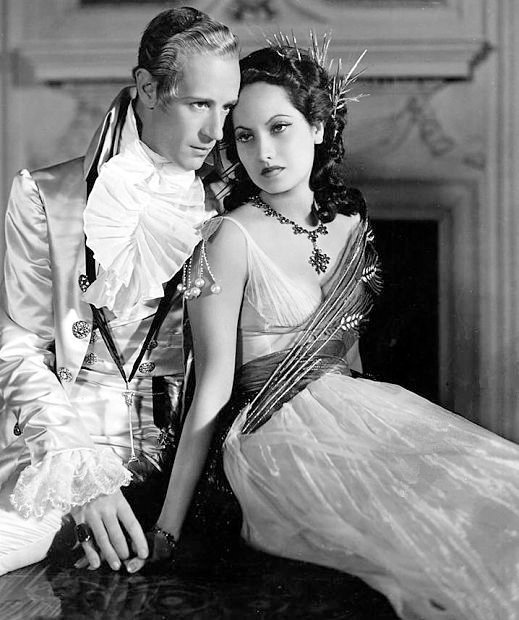
Leslie Howard and Merle Oberon in The Scarlet Pimpernel

In 1792, shortly before the Reign of Terror, select French aristocrats are being saved from death by a secret band of English noblemen. The Scarlet Pimpernel, their mysterious leader, is Sir Percy Blakeney, a wealthy English baronet and friend of the Prince of Wales. Sir Percy cultivates the image of a fop to conceal his identity. Not even his wife Marguerite, a former noted French actress, suspects the truth.

Citizen Chauvelin, the newly appointed French ambassador to England, discovers that Armand St. Just, Marguerite's brother, is one of the Scarlet Pimpernel's agents. Chauvelin orders Armand's arrest and uses the threat of his execution to force Marguerite into helping him discover the identity of the Pimpernel. He has learned that his quarry will be at a forthcoming ball. At the ball, Marguerite intercepts a message stating that the Pimpernel will be in the library at midnight. She passes the information along to Chauvelin, who goes to the library to find Blakeney, apparently asleep. While waiting, Chauvelin falls asleep. When he wakes up, Blakeney still feigning being asleep, Chauvelin finds a message from the Pimpernel mocking him.

The next morning, the Blakeneys travel to their country house. Marguerite breaks down and tells her husband of Armand's arrest and her deal with Chauvelin. Sir Percy, though still deeply in love with his wife, had cooled to her because he learned that she had denounced a French marquis, which had led to the executions of the marquis and his family. She reveals that the marquis had had her imprisoned for consorting with his son. After being freed by the French Revolution, she told her friend Chauvelin, who was the one who denounced them. Promising to help, Percy leaves for London. Afterward, Marguerite notices a detail on a portrait of the 1st baronet: a ring decorated with a scarlet pimpernel. Realising that she has betrayed her own husband, she rushes out of the room, only to be presented a letter from Chauvelin announcing that he has discovered the Pimpernel's true identity as well. Racing back to London, she warns Ffoulkes that Percy's life is in danger. Ffoulkes mobilises the band to warn Percy.

To lure Percy into his trap, Chauvelin has both Armand and the Count de Tournay transferred to Boulogne-sur-Mer. Despite the vigilance of Chauvelin's men, the Pimpernel frees the two men through bribery. However, one of the prison guards tells Chauvelin that the Pimpernel will be at a certain tavern that evening. Marguerite rushes there to warn Percy, only to be arrested by Chauvelin. Percy arrives at the appointed time and is met by a gloating Chauvelin. Percy distracts him long enough for Armand and the count to board the ship, but when Chauvelin informs him that he has Marguerite in custody, Percy surrenders on the condition that she be freed. He is taken away to be shot by a firing squad. Chauvelin exults at the sound of the guns, but Percy returns very much alive; the "soldiers" are in fact his men. Leaving Chauvelin unharmed, Percy and his wife sail back to England.

== Cast ==
- Leslie Howard as Sir Percy Blakeney
- Merle Oberon as Lady Blakeney
- Raymond Massey as Chauvelin
- Nigel Bruce as The Prince of Wales
- Bramwell Fletcher as The Priest
- Anthony Bushell as Sir Andrew Ffoulkes
- Joan Gardner as Suzanne de Tournay
- Walter Rilla as Armand St. Just
- Mabel Terry-Lewis as Countess de Tournay
- O. B. Clarence as Count de Tournay
- Ernest Milton as Robespierre
- Edmund Breon as Colonel Winterbottom
- Melville Cooper as Romney
- Gibb McLaughlin as The Barber
- Morland Graham as Treadle (credited as Moreland Graham)
- John Turnbull as Jellyband
- Gertrude Musgrove as Sally, Jellyband's daughter
- Allan Jeayes as Lord Grenville
- A. Bromley Davenport as French Innkeeper (Brogard) (as Bromley Davenport)
- William Freshman as Lord Hastings
- Hindle Edgar as Lord Wilmot

== Production ==
By 1934, Alexander Korda was attempting to elevate the British film industry to the perceived level of the American film industry. To do so, he decided to import American directors to work on his films, inviting (among others) image-oriented writer-director Rowland Brown to direct The Scarlet Pimpernel—a huge opportunity for the young director.

Korda, a Hungarian born in a town not far from Pimpernel authoress Baroness Orczy's farm, had recently had great success with the actor Charles Laughton in the film The Private Life of Henry VIII, so he asked Laughton to play the role of Sir Percy. When the announcement went out to the press, the reaction from the Pimpernel's many fans was negative; the pug-nosed Laughton was thought a poor choice to play the suave Sir Percy. Korda thus gave the role to Leslie Howard.

Not long after filming began, Korda arrived on the set to observe Brown at work. He told Brown that he was directing the classic like a gangster film. Raymond Massey, who witnessed the scene, wrote "Brown announced he would direct the way he liked or walk out. Alex said very sweetly, 'Please walk.'" Korda replaced Brown with another American already being employed by him, editor-director Harold Young; in the event, Brown was left unemployed and stranded in England.

== Reception ==
When it premiered at the Radio City Music Hall, Andre Sennwald wrote in a contemporary The New York Times that "'The Scarlet Pimpernel' is stirring to the pulse and beautiful to the eye, and it weaves the richly textured background of those tingling months of the French Revolution into an enormously satisfying photoplay. ... Did the narrative seem a trifle leisurely in places? No matter. It was a leisurely age and here is a succulent and captivating entertainment." He also praised Leslie Howard's performance.

=== Box office ===
The Scarlet Pimpernel was the sixth most popular film at the British box office during 1935–36.
