= The Laughing Cavalier (film) =

1917 film

The Laughing Cavalier is a 1917 British silent adventure film directed by A. V. Bramble and Eliot Stannard and starring Mercy Hatton, Edward O'Neill and George Bellamy. It is an adaptation of the 1913 novel The Laughing Cavalier by Baroness Emmuska Orczy.

== Cast ==
- Mercy Hatton - Gilda Beresteyn
- George Bellamy - Lord Stoutenberg
- Edward O'Neill - Governor Beresteyn
- A.V. Bramble - Diogenes
- Frederick Sargent - Nicholas Beresteyn
- Eva Westlake - Lady Stoutenberg
