= Fred Groves (actor) =

British actor (1880–1955)

- Born: 8 August 1880; London, England
- Died: 4 June 1955 (aged 74); London, England
- Occupation: Actor
- Years active: 1896–1950

Fred Groves (8 August 1880 – 4 June 1955) was a British actor of the celebrated Groves acting family. On stage from 1896, he appeared in the original West End production of Noël Coward's Cavalcade (1931–2); and was a leading man in silent films, latterly becoming a character player in movies. He appeared in the 1925 play Number 17 in the West End.

He was a son of Charles Groves (1843–1909), a well-known Victorian and Edwardian comedic actor who made appearances on Broadway and in London's West End. He was also a nephew of the Fred Karno comedian Walter Groves (1856–1906), and a half-brother to the film and stage actor Charles Groves (1875–1955).

Among his feature film appearances was the comedy Sally In Our Alley. It marked the screen debut of Gracie Fields, an established music hall star. Gracie's husband, the screenwriter Archie Pitt was set to play the leading role of Alf Cope, but during the first week of filming, as Fields and Pitt were travelling back from shooting, their car crashed. Though Fields escaped injury, Pitt was forced to withdraw from the cast in order to recuperate. Due to his experience and availability, the role was quickly recast with Groves taking Pitt's place.

== Selected filmography ==
- Maria Marten (1913, Short) - William Corder
- Popsy Wopsy (1913)
- The Suicide Club (1914) - The President
- The Loss of the Birkenhead (1914) - Seth
- Her Luck in London (1914) - Richard Lenowen
- The Idol of Paris (1914) - Philippe Castelle
- Honeymoon for Three (1915) - Cornelius V. Van Dam
- Gilbert Gets Tiger-It is (1915, Short) - Gilbert
- Gilbert Dying to Die (1915, Short) - Gilbert
- Florence Nightingale (1915) - Doctor
- From Shopgirl to Duchess (1915) - Duke of St. Baynum
- The World's Desire (1915) - Sir Richard Bennett
- Her Nameless Child (1915) - Arthur Ford
- Home (1915) - Steven Armitage
- Mr. Lyndon at Liberty (1915) - Tom Morrison
- Fine Feathers (1915) - Richard Dean
- Charity Ann (1915) - Graham Trevor
- A Will of Her Own (1915) - Dr. Blake
- The Firm of Girdlestone (1915) - Ezra Girdlestone
- Meg the Lady (1916) - Giles Curwen
- Esther (1916, Short) - Haman
- Driven (1916) - John Staffurth
- The Two Roads (1916) - Reverend Basil Egerton
- The Manxman (1916) - Pete Quillian - A fisherman
- Mother Love (1916) - Alfie
- Smith (1917) - Tom Freeman
- Drink (1917) - Coupeau
- The Grit of a Jew (1917) - Russell
- The Labour Leader (1917) - John Webster
- Castle of Dreams (1919) - John Morton
- London Pride (1920) - Cuthbert Tunks
- Garryowen (1920) - Michael French
- Judge Not (1920) - Burke
- Squibs (1921) - PC Charlie Lee
- The Mayor of Casterbridge (1921) - Michael Henchard
- A Master of Craft (1922) - Captain Flower
- The Crimson Circle (1922) - Inspector Parr
- Squibs Wins the Calcutta Sweep (1922) - P. C. Lee
- Rogues of the Turf (1923) - Bill Higgins
- Squibs M.P. (1923) - PC Charlie Lee
- Squibs' Honeymoon (1923) - PC Charlie Lee
- Memories (1925, Short) - The Husband
- Suspense (1930) - Pvt. Lomax
- Escape (1930) - Shopkeeper
- Sally in Our Alley (1931) - Alf Cope
- Out of the Blue (1931) - Bannister Blair
- The World, the Flesh, the Devil (1932) - Dick Morgan
- The Ghost Camera (1933) - Innkeeper
- Puppets of Fate (1933) - Arthur Brandon
- A Glimpse of Paradise (1934) - Joshua Ware
- The Old Curiosity Shop (1934) - Showman (uncredited)
- Dance Band (1935) - Pantomime Act
- Beloved Imposter (1936) - Jack Harding
- Royal Cavalcade (1936) - Sam Waldock
- Second Bureau (1936) - Sgt. Colleret
- The Squeaker (1937) - Martin (uncredited)
- Vessel of Wrath (1938) - Dutch Sea Captain (uncredited)
- The Viper (1938) - Inspector Bradlaw
- The Challenge (1938) - Favre
- Strange Boarders (1938) - (uncredited)
- No Parking (1938) - Walsh
- Climbing High (1938) - Doorman (uncredited)
- 21 Days (1940) - Barnes
- An Ideal Husband (1947) - Phipps, Goring's Butler
- Night Beat (1947) - PC Kendall
- My Brother Jonathan (1948) - Lisha Hodgkiss
- My Brother's Keeper (1948) - Landlord
- Old Mother Riley's New Venture (1949) - Grigsby
- Your Witness (1950) - Dart Player #6 (uncredited)
- The Girl Who Couldn't Quite (1950) - Manservant
- Up for the Cup (1950) - Hardcastle (final film role)
