= Midshipman Easy =

- Original trade ad
- Directed by: Carol Reed
- Written by: Frederick Marryat (novel); Anthony Kimmins; Peggy Thompson
- Produced by: Basil Dean
- Starring: Hughie Green; Margaret Lockwood; Harry Tate; Robert Adams; Roger Livesey
- Cinematography: John W. Boyle
- Edited by: Sidney Cole
- Music by: Frederic Austin; Ernest Irving
- Production company: Associated Talking Pictures
- Distributed by: ABFD
- Release date: November 1935
- Running time: 70 minutes
- Country: United Kingdom
- Language: English

Midshipman Easy is a 1935 British adventure film directed by Carol Reed and starring Hughie Green, Margaret Lockwood, Harry Tate and Robert Adams. The screenplay concerns a young man who runs away from home, joins the navy and goes to sea in the 1790s. He rescues a captive woman from a Spanish ship and battles pirates and smugglers. The film was based on the novel Mr Midshipman Easy (1836) by Frederick Marryat.

== Cast ==
- Hughie Green as Midshipman Easy
- Margaret Lockwood as Donna Agnes
- Harry Tate as Mr Biggs
- Robert Adams as Mesty
- Roger Livesey as Captain Wilson
- Dennis Wyndham as Don Silvio
- Lewis Casson as Mr Easy
- Tom Gill as Gascoine
- Frederick Burtwell as Mr. Easthupp
- Desmond Tester as Gossett
- Dorothy Holmes-Gore as Mrs Easy

== Production ==
The film was made at Ealing Studios by Basil Dean's Associated Talking Pictures. The film was a moderate success on its initial release in Britain. It was first released in the United States in 1951 by Astor Pictures.

The cliff top action sequences and rocky shore scenes of the film were shot on the Isle of Portland.

It was an early role for Margaret Lockwood and the first of several collaborations between her and Carol Reed.

== Critical reception ==
Writing for The Spectator in 1936, Graham Greene praised Carol Reed on his directorial debut, noting that he had "more sense of the cinema than most veteran British directors". Greene described the film as "simply and dramatically cut", and commented that it contained "the best fight [he could] remember on the screen". Greene "unreservedly recommended [the film] to children".

Allmovie noted "a ripping yarn"; and Britmovie noted, "a great work of popular entertainment in its own era, Captain Marryat’s novel is a logical subject for the mass audience that attends films," but concluded, "the film’s budget was as limited as other British movies of the period, and most of it was shot at the Ealing Studios in London. A minor financial and critical success in England, Midshipman Easy did not even strike the British as more than a spirited bit of ephemera and there is very little about the picture to change anyone’s mind today" and NitrateVille wrote, "a rather remarkable little British film, a sort of boy's view of going to sea, that boasts several excellent performances and one that is downright astonishing...a remarkable performance by Robert Adams, a black actor, who plays Mesty. Mesty's job onboard the ship is rather vague, but he becomes Early's [sic] protector and right-hand man. He's promoted to the rank of corporal and later saves Early's [sic] life by fighting the Italian desperado and throwing him over a cliff. The class and bravery of this black character in a 1935 British film outpaces anything I can think of in an American film of the era."
