= Florence Nightingale (1915 film) =

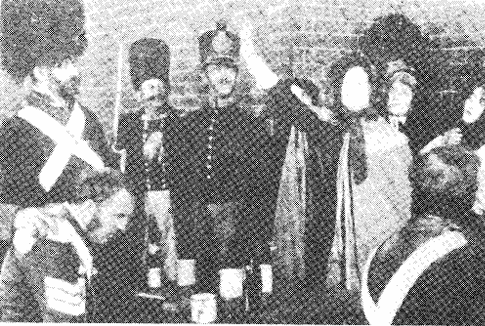
- Still showing Nightingale, played by Elizabeth Risdon, reprimanding a group of women and soldiers
- Directed by: Maurice Elvey
- Starring: Elizabeth Risdon
- Production company: British and Colonial Films
- Release date: 1915
- Country: United Kingdom
- Languages: Silent; English intertitles

Florence Nightingale (1915) is a British biographical film about the nurse of the same name. It tells the story of her life with a focus on her efforts to improve the care of wounded British soldiers during the Crimean War. It was based on a biography of Nightingale by Edward Cook.

The film was marketed as patriotic and relevant to the political context of an ongoing war. It was well reviewed in contemporary newspapers. It is now lost.

== Plot ==
The film has been lost. A synopsis was published in the Kinematograph Weekly, a trade magazine, in 1915. A girl is born in Florence, Italy in 1820 into an English family and named Florence Nightingale after her birthplace. As a child, she plays at being a nurse and bandages a broken doll. She grows into a young woman who helps others; assisting the poor and treating a sick dog. Nightingale has a comfortable lifestyle but, unlike her friends, is troubled by the suffering of other people. She rejects offers of marriage and convinces her parents to allow her to train as a nurse with the Sisters of Mercy in Paris. She returns to London after her training and explains her desire to become a nurse to the Secretary of State for War. He initially disapproves but is persuaded to find Nightingale a job managing a hospital in Harley Street.

Following the outbreak of the Crimean War, wounded British soldiers suffer from poor medical treatment. Nightingale convinces the sceptical War Office to allow her to travel with a group of nurses to Scutari to improve conditions in the British military hospital there. She finds that the hospital is poorly furnished and overcrowded. The surgeons are reluctant to accept women's presence in the hospital, but Nightingale persuades them to take her advice. She and her nurses work quickly to improve conditions in the hospital. She gains the affection of the wounded men but enforces a rule against sexual relationships between nurses and soldiers. Nightingale travels to another hospital in Crimea where she discovers a nurse has a lover among the patients. She dismisses the woman and takes on her work. Nightingale falls ill with "Crimean flu" and is helped by the soldiers and nurses; she survives but never fully recovers.

After returning home, Nightingale persuades the government to conduct a Royal Commission into the conditions of soldiers. She is regularly visited by admirers and continues charity work. In her old age she receives an Order of Merit from Edward VII. The film ends with her death.

== Background, production and marketing ==
Florence Nightingale was a biographical film about the nurse of the same name. Nightingale was an English nurse who became famous during the Crimean War for improving conditions in British military hospitals. Her fame continued throughout her lifetime and after her death in 1910.

The film was based on a biography of Florence Nightingale by Edward Cook. It was a silent, feature-length production made in the United Kingdom by British and Colonial Films. It starred Elisabeth Risdon as the titular character and was directed by Maurice Elvey.

Florence Nightingale was released in 1915. It was marketed as factual and promotional materials linked Nightingale's activities to the context of the First World War. The government was not using film for domestic propaganda purposes in the early part of the war, but the film industry's magazines were strongly supportive of the war effort. An advertisement in the Kinematograph Weekly, intended to persuade cinemas to order the film, described the film as telling an exciting, patriotic story which would receive an enthusiastic response from the audience.

Advertisements for the film in English and Welsh newspapers often described it as an account of "a noble Englishwoman". Scottish press advertisements often used similar language with the term "British". An advertisement in the Galway Express, an Irish local newspaper, described it as the story of "a Noble Woman" which would remind the audience of the contribution women could make in wartime. An advertisement in the Morpeth Herald marketed the film to a young audience; noting that each child viewer would be given a free orange and that competitions where children could win prizes would be held.

== Reaction and analysis ==
A positive review of Florence Nightingale appeared in the trade magazine The Bioscope. It began by emphasising that the film was timely and beneficial to Britain's war effort. It also praised the film's technical merits noting that the costumes were historically accurate and that certain scenes "show very striking effects of light and shade." The reviewer praised the performance of the lead actor, Elizabeth Risdon, but felt that her acting could have been better in some of the earlier scenes. It concluded that the film was of "undeniable interest and cannot fail to be received with universal favour". The Fife Free Press was also complimentary describing the film as exciting, contemporary and likely to be popular. A review in an American trade magazine, Variety, praised the film, describing it as "beautiful" and about a good subject. However, it criticised the film for not mentioning the Red Cross, or Nightingale's pet parrot which had died when she was separated from it.

The film was discussed in a 1983 academic paper on depictions of Florence Nightingale in the media. The article comments that the film depicted Nightingale as a heroic figure and focused on her desire to help others. It suggests that the film reinforced Nightingale's prominence in collective memory and may have helped to persuade certain young women to volunteer to care for wounded British soldiers on behalf of the British Red Cross. A 2006 biography of Maurice Elvey commented that Florence Nightingale was one of a group of biographical films he made at around the same time which "reveal a Janus-faced director, working firmly in a tradition of Victorian hagiography, but clearly searching for contemporary relevance. They show some startlingly modern touches of associative editing and a facility for location and crowd scenes."

== Bibliography ==
- Bates, Richard; Greenwood, Anna (28 February 2022). "Could Nightingale get cancelled? The rise, endurance, and possible fall of Florence Nightingale in British historical culture since 1854". Women's History Review. 31 (7): 1080–1106. doi:10.1080/09612025.2022.2045110. ISSN 0961-2025.
- Hunger, R.F (1 April 1915). "Florence Nightingale: The Story of a Noble English Woman". Kinematograph Weekly. pp. 113–134.
- Jolo (April 1915). "Film Reviews: Florence Nightingale". Variety. Vol. 38, no. 6. p. 20. ISSN 0042-2738. ProQuest 1529102481.
- Kalisch, Beatrice J (June 1983). "Heroine out of focus: media images of Florence Nightingale. Part II. Film, radio, and television dramatizations". Nursing & Health Care. 4 (6): 270–278. PMID 6343930 – via National Library of Medicine.
- Murphy, Robert (2006). Directors in British and Irish Cinema: A Reference Companion. London: BFI Publishing. ISBN 978-1-83871-533-5.
- Reeves, Nicholas (July 1983). "Film Propaganda and its Audience: The Example of Britain's Official Films during the First World War". Journal of Contemporary History. 18 (3): 463–494. doi:10.1177/002200948301800306. ISSN 0022-0094.
