= Elisabeth Risdon =

English film actress (1887–1958)

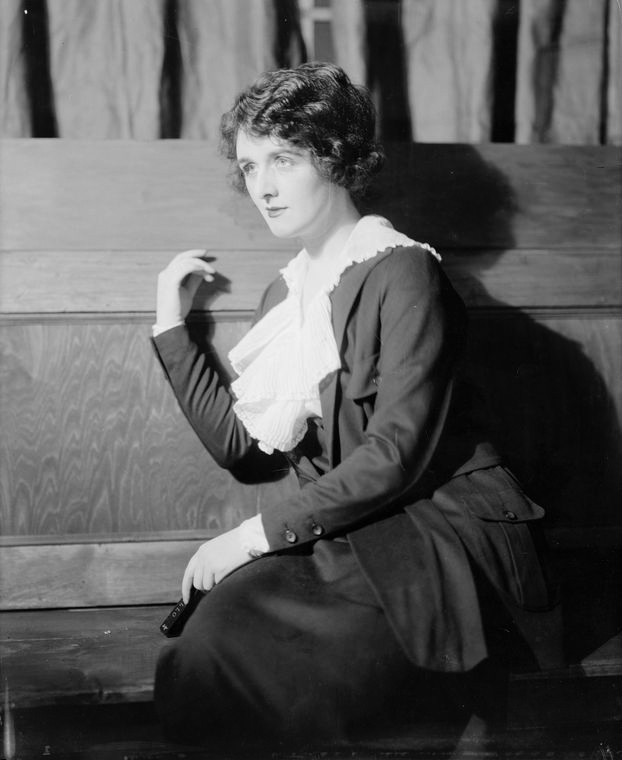
- Risdon in G. B. Shaw's Heartbreak House (1920)
- Born: Daisy Cartwright Risdon; 26 April 1887; London, England
- Died: 20 December 1958 (aged 71); Santa Monica, California, U.S.
- Occupation: Actress
- Years active: 1913–1956
- Spouses: George Loane Tucker (m. 1916; died 1921) Brandon Evans (m. 1938; died 1958)

Elisabeth Risdon (born Daisy Cartwright Risdon; 26 April 1887 – 20 December 1958) was an English film actress. She appeared in more than 140 films from 1913 to 1952. A beauty in her youth, she usually played in society parts. In later years in films she switched to playing character parts.

== Early life ==
Risdon was born in London as Daisy Cartwright Risdon, the daughter of John Jenkins Risdon and Martha Harrop Risdon. She graduated from the Royal Academy of Arts in 1918 with high honours.

== Career ==
She attracted the attention of George Bernard Shaw and was cast as the lead in his biggest plays. Besides her performances for Shaw, she was leading lady for actors including George Arliss, Otis Skinner, and William Faversham. She was also under contract with the Theatre Guild for many years.

Risdon's film debut came in England, where she made 13 silent films. She came to the United States in 1912, and her first film with sound was Guard That Girl (1935).

Her Broadway credits include Laburnum Grove (1935), Big Hearted Herbert (1934), Uncle Tom's Cabin (1933), For Services Rendered (1933), We Never Learn (1928), The Springboard (1927), Right You Are If You Think You Are (1927), The Silver Cord (1926), A Proud Woman (1926), Lovely Lady (1925), The Enchanted April (1925), Thrills (1925), Artistic Temperament (1924), Cock O' the Roost (1924), The Lady (1923), The Nightcap (1921), Heartbreak House (1920), Footloose (1920), Dear Brutus (1918), Humpty Dumpty (1918), Muggins (1918), Seven Days' Leave (1918), Misalliance (1917), The Morris Dance (1917), The Poetasters of Ispahan (1912), Beauty and the Jacobin (1912), and Fanny's First Play (1912).

== Personal life ==
In 1916, she married silent film director George Loane Tucker, who died in 1921. In 1938, she married actor Brandon Evans, who died in April 1958.

== Death ==
Risdon died in December 1958 in St. John's Hospital in Santa Monica, California, from a cerebral hemorrhage.

== Partial filmography ==
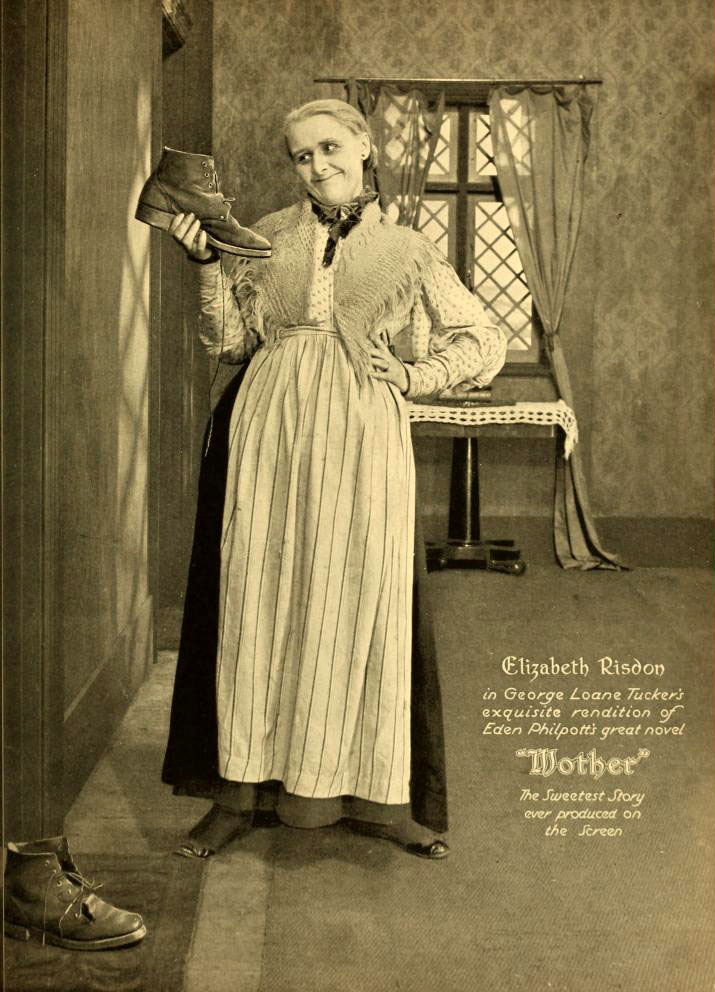
Mother (1917)

- Maria Marten (1913 short) - Maria Marten
- The Suicide Club (1914) - Zephyrine
- The Loss of the Birkenhead (1914) - Deborah
- Her Luck in London (1914) - Nellie Harbourne
- The Idol of Paris (1914) - Flare-Flare
- Honeymoon for Three (1915) - Molly Van Dam
- Gilbert Gets Tiger-It is (1915 short) - Mrs. Gilbert
- From Shopgirl to Duchess (1915) - Sylvia Gray
- Florence Nightingale (1915) - Florence Nightingale
- Her Nameless Child (1915) - Phyllis / Alice Ford
- Home (1915) - Joan Bicester
- The Christian (1915) - Gloria Quayle
- Love in a Wood (1915) - Rosiland
- Fine Feathers (1915) - Meg Roberts
- Charity Ann (1915) - Ann Charity
- A Will of Her Own (1915) - Isabel Stanton
- Meg the Lady (1916) - Lady Brisby
- Esther (1916 short) - Esther
- Driven (1916) - Katherine Crichton
- The Hypocrites (1916) - Rachel Neve
- The Princess of Happy Chance (1916) - Princess Felicia / Lucidora Eden
- The Manxman (1916) - Kate Gregeen
- Mother Love (1916) - Mary
- Smith (1917) - Smith
- The Mother of Dartmoor (1917) - Avesa Pomeroy
- Guard That Girl (1935) - Aunt Catherine
- Crime and Punishment (1935) - Mrs. Raskolnikov
- Lady of Secrets (1936) - Mrs. Emily Whittaker
- Don't Gamble with Love (1936) - Grace
- The King Steps Out (1936) - Grand Duchess Sofia
- The Final Hour (1936) - Fortune Teller
- Craig's Wife (1936) - Mrs. Landreth
- Theodora Goes Wild (1936) - Aunt Mary
- The Woman I Love (1937) - Mme. Herbillion
- Mountain Justice (1937) - Meg Harkins
- Make Way for Tomorrow (1937) - Cora Payne
- They Won't Forget (1937) - Mrs. Hale
- Dead End (1937) - Mrs. Connell
- Mannequin (1937) - Mrs.Cassidy
- Mad About Music (1938) - Annette Fusenot
- My Bill (1938) - Aunt Caroline
- Cowboy from Brooklyn (1938) - Mrs. Jordan
- The Affairs of Annabel (1938) - Mrs. Fletcher
- Girls on Probation (1938) - Kate Heath
- Tom Sawyer, Detective (1938) - Aunt Sally
- The Great Man Votes (1939) - Phoebe Ainslee
- The Adventures of Huckleberry Finn (1939) - Widow Douglass
- The Man Who Dared (1939) - Jessie Carter
- Sorority House (1939) - Mrs. Scott
- The Girl from Mexico (1939) - Aunt Della Lindsay
- Five Came Back (1939) - Martha Spengler
- The Forgotten Woman (1939) - Margaret Burke
- Full Confession (1939) - Norah O'Keefe
- Disputed Passage (1939) - Mrs. Cunningham
- The Roaring Twenties (1939) - Mrs. Sherman
- Mexican Spitfire (1940) - Aunt Della Lindsay
- The Man Who Wouldn't Talk (1940) - Jury Member
- Abe Lincoln in Illinois (1940) - Sarah Lincoln
- Honeymoon Deferred (1940) - Sarah Frome
- Ma! He's Making Eyes at Me (film) (1940) - Minerva
- Saturday's Children (1940) - Mrs. Halevy
- Sing, Dance, Plenty Hot (1940) - Agatha
- The Howards of Virginia (1940) - Aunt Clarissa
- Slightly Tempted (1940) - Ethelreda Knox
- Let's Make Music (1941) - Malvina Adams
- High Sierra (1941) - Ma
- Nice Girl? (1941) - Martha Peasley
- Mr. Dynamite (1941) - Achilles
- Footlight Fever (1941) - Aunt Hattie Drake
- The Mexican Spitfire's Baby (1941) - Aunt Della
- Paris Calling (1941) - Madame Jennetier
- Jail House Blues (1942) - Mrs. Alyosius McGonigle McGann
- The Man Who Returned to Life (1942) - Minerva Sunday
- The Lady Is Willing (1942) - Mrs. Cummings
- Mexican Spitfire at Sea (1942) - Aunt Della Lindsay
- Reap the Wild Wind (1942) - Mrs. Claiborne
- Are Husbands Necessary? (1942) - Mrs. Westwood
- I Live on Danger (1942) - Mrs. Morrell
- Mexican Spitfire Sees a Ghost (1942) - Aunt Della Lindsay
- Mexican Spitfire's Elephant (1942) - Aunt Della Lindsay
- Journey for Margaret (1942) - Mrs. Bailey
- Random Harvest (1942) - Mrs. Lloyd
- The Amazing Mrs. Holliday (1943) - Louise Holliday
- Mexican Spitfire's Blessed Event (1943) - Aunt Della Lindsay
- Never a Dull Moment (1943) - Mrs. Schuyler Manning III
- Higher and Higher (1943) - Mrs. Georgia Keating
- Weird Woman (1944) - Grace Gunnison
- The Canterville Ghost (1944) - Mrs. Polverdine
- In the Meantime, Darling (1944) - Mrs. Helen Corkery
- Tall in the Saddle (1944) - Miss Elizabeth Martin
- Blonde Fever (1944) - Mrs. Talford
- Grissly's Millions (1945) - Leona Palmor
- A Song for Miss Julie (1945) - Mrs. Ambrose Charteris
- The Unseen (1945) - Mrs. Norris
- Mama Loves Papa (1945) - Jessie Todd
- The Fighting Guardsman (1946) - Mme. de Montrevel (uncredited)
- They Made Me a Killer (1946) - 'Ma' Conley
- The Walls Came Tumbling Down (1946) - Catherine Walsh
- Lover Come Back (1946) - 'Ma' Williams
- Roll on Texas Moon (1946) - Cactus Kate Taylor
- The Shocking Miss Pilgrim (1947) - Mrs. Prichard
- The Egg and I (1947) - Birdie's Mother
- The Romance of Rosy Ridge (1947) - Emily Baggett
- Life with Father (1947) - Mrs. Whitehead
- Mourning Becomes Electra (1947) - Mrs. Hills
- High Wall (1947) - Mrs. Kenet
- The Bride Goes Wild (1948) - Mrs. Carruthers
- Bodyguard (1948) - Gene Dysen
- Sealed Verdict (1948) - Mrs. Hockland
- Every Girl Should Be Married (1948) - Mary Nolan
- Down Dakota Way (1949) - Dolly Paxton
- Guilty of Treason (1950) - Mother Mindszenty
- The Secret Fury (1950) - Dr. Twining
- Sierra (1950) - Aunt Susan
- Hills of Oklahoma (1950) - Kate Carney
- Bunco Squad (1950) - Jessica Royce
- The Milkman (1950) - Mrs. Laura Carter
- My True Story (1951) - Mme. Rousseau
- In Old Amarillo (1951) - Granny Adams
- Bannerline (1951) - Mrs. Margaret Trimble
- It's a Big Country (1951) - Diner on Train (uncredited)
- Scaramouche (1952) - Isabelle de Valmorin
