= M. Gray Murray =

British actor

- Postcard
- Born: Milton Gray Buist; 1871; Hampstead, London, England
- Died: 10 February 1937 (aged 65–66); Wokingham, England
- Occupation: Actor

M. Gray Murray (1871 – 10 February 1937) was a British actor of the silent era.

== Selected filmography ==
- Jobson's Luck (1913)
- The Lure of London (1914)
- The Troubles of an Heiress (1914)
- The Loss of the Birkenhead (1914)
- The Life of Shakespeare (1914)
- Her Luck in London (1914)
- Florence Nightingale (1915)
- Home (1915)
- The World's Desire (1915)
- The Four Feathers (1921)
- A Woman of No Importance (1921)
- Sonia (1921)
- The Place of Honour (1921)
- Married Life (1921)
- The Taming of the Shrew (1923)
