= Maurice Elvey =

British film director (1887–1967)

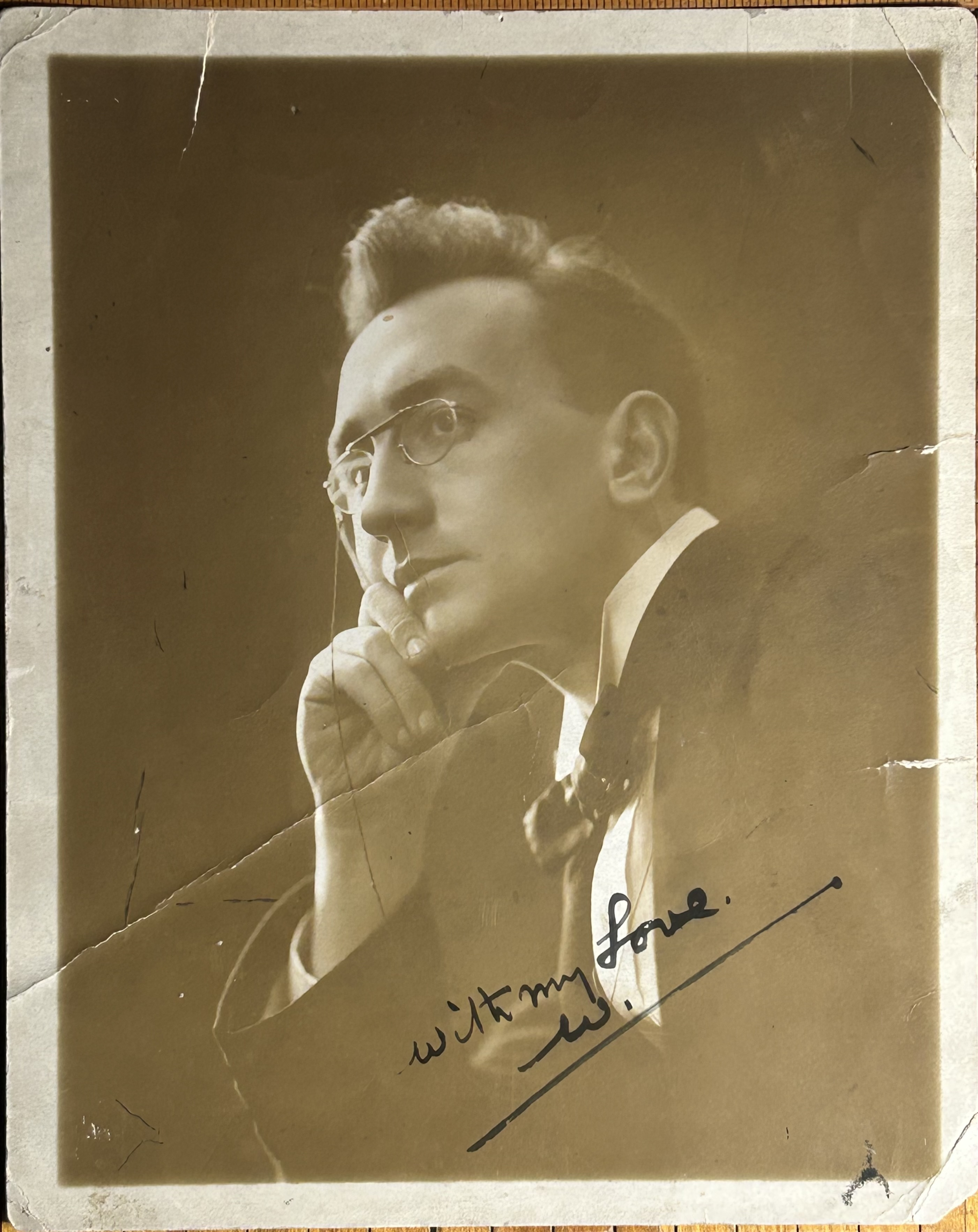
- Initialed "W" For "William" (1915)
- Born: William Seward Folkard; 11 November 1887; Stockton-on-Tees, England
- Died: 28 August 1967 (aged 79); Brighton, England
- Occupations: Film director Film producer
- Years active: 1913–1958
- Spouse(s): Philippa Preston (m. 191?; div. 191?); Florence Hill Clarke (m. 1916; div. 19??); Isobel Elsom (m. 1923; div. 19??)

Maurice Elvey (11 November 1887 – 28 August 1967) was one of the most prolific film directors in British history. He directed nearly 200 films between 1913 and 1957. During the silent film era he directed as many as twenty films per year. He also produced more than fifty films – his own as well as films directed by others.

== Biography ==
Born William Seward Folkard in Stockton-on-Tees, he ran away from home at the age of nine, seeking his fortune in London. There he worked variously as a kitchen hand and hotel pageboy, before ending up as stagehand and actor at the age of 17. He quickly rose to directing and producing plays and established his own theatrical company before switching to films with The Great Gold Robbery in 1913. He directed a wide array of popular features in a variety of genres, including comedy, drama, literary adaptations – including Robert Louis Stevenson's The Suicide Club (1914) and a version of William Shakespeare's As You Like It entitled Love in a Wood (1916) – and biographical profiles of figures including Florence Nightingale and Lord Nelson. The Life Story of David Lloyd George (originally titled The Man Who Saved The Empire), suppressed for political reasons just prior to its release in 1918, had its world premiere in Cardiff in May 1996 and was hailed by critics and film historians as one of the best silent films produced in the UK.

Between 1921 and 1923, Elvey directed 45 two-reel short films in three series: The Adventures of Sherlock Holmes (1921), The Further Adventures of Sherlock Holmes (1922) and The Last Adventures of Sherlock Holmes (1923), and two feature films, The Hound of the Baskervilles and The Sign of Four) with Eille Norwood as Sherlock Holmes. The actor was Arthur Conan Doyle's favourite among those who portrayed his literary sleuth.

Elvey was employed by the Fox Film Corporation in 1924 and made 5 films for them in America before returning to Europe the following year.

Elvey worked with such performers as Leslie Howard, Ivor Novello, Ida Lupino, Benita Hume, Gracie Fields, Claude Rains, Alastair Sim, Leslie Banks, and Fay Wray, and mentored future directors Carol Reed, David Lean, and Ronald Neame. In 1944, he was charmed by Petula Clark when he saw her perform at the Royal Albert Hall, and he launched her film career by casting her as a precocious waif in his wartime drama Medal for the General. The two collaborated on three additional films.

Elvey was married three times, to actress Philippa Preston, sculptor Florence Hill Clarke, and actress Isobel Elsom, whom he met on the set of The Wandering Jew in 1923. The couple went on to make eight films together.

The loss of an eye and failing health prompted Elvey's retirement at the age of 70. Ten years later he died in Brighton.

== Filmography ==
Director

- Popsy Wopsy (1913)
- Maria Marten (1913)
- The White Feather (1914)
- Her Luck in London (1914)
- The Loss of the Birkenhead (1914)
- The Idol of Paris (1914)
- The Suicide Club (1914)
- Honeymoon for Three (1915)
- There's Good in Everyone (1915)
- Gilbert Dying to Die (1915)
- Home (1915)
- Her Nameless Child (1915)
- Love in a Wood (1915)
- From Shopgirl to Duchess (1915)
- Gilbert Gets Tiger-Itis (1915)
- Midshipman Easy (1915)
- Fine Feathers (1915)
- Florence Nightingale (1915)
- A Will of Her Own (1915)
- Charity Ann (1915)
- When Knights Were Bold (1916)
- Driven (1916)
- Mother Love (1916)
- Meg the Lady (1916)
- Esther (1916)
- Trouble for Nothing (1916)
- Vice Versa (1916)
- The Princess of Happy Chance (1916)
- The King's Daughter (1916)
- The Woman Who Was Nothing (1917)
- The Grit of a Jew (1917)
- Smith (1917)
- Justice (1917)
- The Gay Lord Quex (1917)
- Flames (1917)
- Mary Girl (1917)
- Dombey and Son (1917)
- The Man Who Saved The Empire (1918)
- Hindle Wakes (1918)
- Nelson (1918)
- The Greatest Wish in the World (1918)
- The Swindler (1918)
- Goodbye (1918)
- Adam Bede (1918)
- Comradeship (1919)
- God's Good Man (1919)
- Mr. Wu (1919)
- The Elusive Pimpernel (1919)
- Quinneys (1919)
- The Rocks of Valpre (1919)
- Keeper of the Door (1919)
- The Swindler (1919)
- The Tavern Knight (1920)
- The Victory Leaders (1920)
- A Question of Trust (1920)
- At the Villa Rose (1920)
- The Hundredth Chance (1920)
- The Amateur Gentleman (1920)
- Bleak House (1920)
- Innocent (1921)
- The Adventures of Sherlock Holmes (1921)
- A Gentleman of France (1921)
- A Romance of Wastdale (1921)
- The Fruitful Vine (1921)
- Dick Turpin's Ride to York (1922)
- A Debt of Honour (1922)
- Running Water (1922)
- Man and His Kingdom (1922)
- The Hound of the Baskervilles (1922)
- The Passionate Friends (1922)
- Don Quixote (1923)
- Guy Fawkes (1923)
- The Royal Oak (1923)
- The Wandering Jew (1923)
- The Sign of Four (1923)
- Sally Bishop (1924)
- Henry, King of Navarre (1924)
- Slaves of Destiny (1924)
- The Love Story of Aliette Brunton (1924)
- My Husband's Wives (1924)
- Folly of Vanity (1924)
- Curlytop (1924)
- She Wolves (1925)
- Every Man's Wife (1925)
- The Woman Tempted (1926)
- The Flag Lieutenant (1926)
- Mademoiselle from Armentieres (1926)
- Human Law (1927)
- Roses of Picardy (1927)
- Hindle Wakes (1927)
- The Flight Commander (1927)
- Quinneys (1927)
- The Glad Eye (1927)
- Mademoiselle Parley Voo (1928)
- Balaclava (1928)
- Palais de danse (1928)
- You Know What Sailors Are (1928)
- High Treason (1929)
- The School for Scandal (1930)
- Potiphar's Wife (1931)
- Sally in Our Alley (1931)
- A Honeymoon Adventure (1931)
- Frail Women (1932)
- The Marriage Bond (1932)
- The Water Gipsies (1932)
- Diamond Cut Diamond (1932)
- The Lodger (1932)
- In a Monastery Garden (1932)
- The Lost Chord (1933)
- I Lived with You (1933)
- This Week of Grace (1933)
- The Wandering Jew (1933)
- Lily of Killarney (1934)
- Love, Life and Laughter (1934)
- Princess Charming (1934)
- Soldiers of the King (1934)
- My Song for You (1934)
- Road House (1934)
- Heat Wave (1935)
- The Clairvoyant (1935)
- The Tunnel (1935)
- Spy of Napoleon (1936)
- The Man in the Mirror (1936)
- A Romance in Flanders (1937)
- Change for a Sovereign (1937)
- Who Killed John Savage? (1937)
- Melody and Romance (1937)
- Lightning Conductor (1938)
- Who Goes Next? (1938)
- The Return of the Frog (1938)
- A People Eternal (1939)
- Sword of Honour (1939)
- Sons of the Sea (1939)
- Under Your Hat (1940)
- The Spider (1940)
- For Freedom (1940)
- Room for Two (1940)
- Salute John Citizen (1942)
- The Lamp Still Burns (1943)
- Medal for the General (1944)
- Strawberry Roan (1945)
- Beware of Pity (1946)
- The Third Visitor (1951)
- The Late Edwina Black (1951)
- My Wife's Lodger (1952)
- The Great Game (1953)
- Is Your Honeymoon Really Necessary? (1953)
- House of Blackmail (1953)
- The Harassed Hero (1954)
- The Happiness of Three Women (1954)
- What Every Woman Wants (1954)
- The Gay Dog (1954)
- You Lucky People (1955)
- Room in the House (1955)
- Fun at St. Fanny's (1956)
- Dry Rot (1956)
- Stars in Your Eyes (1956)
- Second Fiddle (1957)

Producer (selection)

- Beautiful Jim (1914)
- Her Luck in London (1914)
- Honeymoon for Three (1915)
- It's a Long Way to Tipperary (1915)
- Her Nameless Child (1915)
- Grip (1915)
- Flames (1917)
- The Grit of a Jew (1917)
- The Greatest Wish in the World (1918)
- Goodbye (1918)
- Adam Bede (1918)
- Hindle Wakes (1918)
- Comradeship (1919)
- Dombey and Son (1918)
- The Man Who Saved The Empire (1918)
- Comradeship (1919)
- A Woman in Pawn (1927)
