= Ideal Film Company =

British film production and distribution company

- Company type: Production company Distribution company
- Industry: Film production Film distribution
- Founded: 1911
- Founder: Harry Moses Rowson; Simon Rowson
- Defunct: 1934
- Headquarters: London, United Kingdom
- Number of locations: London; Borehamwood
- Parent: Gaumont British (1927-1934)

The Ideal Film Company (often known as Ideal Films or simply Ideal) was a British film production and distribution company that operated between 1911 and 1934.

== History ==
The company, based in Soho, London, was started by the two Jewish brothers Harry Moses (1875 – 17 August 1951) and Simon (1877 – 26 June 1950) Rowson (born Rosenbaum). They were born in Manchester, where their father, an immigrant from Suwałki in Congress Poland, worked as a butcher.

After having begun as a pure distribution company in 1911, Ideal also began producing films in 1916. In 1917, the company acquired the first of the Elstree Studios in Borehamwood from the Neptune Film Company. During the silent era, the Ideal Film Company became one of the leading British production companies, benefiting from the post-First World War boom in films. However the company was badly hit by the Slump of 1924, and stopped its production, while the distribution arm continued. In 1927 the company was merged into the Gaumont British empire, where it continued to distribute under its own name until 1934.

During its 23 years, the company distributed almost 400 films and produced more than 80. Most of the films produced by the company are now considered lost, but a number still survive. Perhaps the company's best known film is The Life Story of David Lloyd George, a 1918 biopic of the British prime minister David Lloyd George, directed by Maurice Elvey.

Simon Rowson went on to become an adviser to the government on British film, and was the first president of the British Kinematograph Society (1931–1938). His son, Leslie Rowson, became a renowned British cinematographer.

== Selected list of films produced ==
- Lady Windermere's Fan (1916)
- Justice (1917)
- Tom Jones (1917)
- Red Pottage (1918)
- The Life Story of David Lloyd George (1918)
- Dombey and Son (1919)
- The Chinese Puzzle (1919)
- Bleak House (1920)
- Lady Audley's Secret (1920)
- Wuthering Heights (1920)
- Ernest Maltravers (1920)
- Shirley (1921)
- A Woman of No Importance (1921)
- Sybil (1921)
- Bentley's Conscience (1922)
- A Master of Craft (1922)
- The Card (1922)
- The Loves of Mary, Queen of Scots (1923)
- Hutch Stirs 'em Up (1923)
- Hurricane Hutch in Many Adventures (1924)
- Wedding Rehearsal (1932)

== Bibliography ==
- Gledhill, Christine. Reframing British Cinema 1918-1928: Between Restraint and Passion. British Film Institute, 2003.
- Low, Rachael. The History of the British Film, 1918-1929. George Allen & Unwin, 1971.
