= British and Colonial Films =

British and Colonial Films was a British film production company making predominantly silent films in London between 1908 and 1924. It was also known by the abbreviation B & C.

== History ==
The British and Colonial Kinematograph Company was formed in 1908 by Albert Henry ("Bert") Bloomfield (c.1882–1933) and John Benjamin ("Mac") McDowell (1878–1954). At first it operated from a rented basement in central London, using a single camera and developing the negatives in McDowell's house, but soon moved to studios at Newstead House in East Finchley, London.

It developed a reputation for both documentaries and feature films, notably the Lieutenant Daring series, featuring Percy Morgan, and the Dick Turpin and Don Q films. By 1912 it had begun making longer films, such as Robin Hood Outlawed, and using location footage, some shot by Fred Burlingham. It also covered important news stories such as the funeral of Edward VII and the Coronation of George V, as well as major sporting fixtures. In 1910 the company made a film of the Canadian Pacific Railway and, in 1912, filmed the F.A. Cup Final and the Derby, as well as in Jamaica.

In 1913, after Bloomfield had left the company, the studio made what has been cited as "the first British epic film", The Battle of Waterloo. This was filmed by director Charles Weston at Irthlingborough in Northamptonshire. It was made "less as a drama and rather more as a recreation of historic actuality" and contained "elaborately recreated scenes... from the point of view of an ordinary soldier in the thick of the battle". It was nearly an hour and a half long – much longer than most others of the period – and was filmed using hundreds of extras, in five days, at a cost of £1,800, most of which McDowell raised by remortgaging the company. McDowell sold the British rights for £5,000, and raised even more from overseas rights. Two reels and a further fragment, representing roughly half of the film, are now preserved in the BFI National Archive. A parody of the film, The Adventures of Pimple: The Battle of Waterloo, written and produced by Fred and Joe Evans, was produced and released within a month of the original film. In 1919, the director of The Battle of Waterloo, Charles Weston, jumped to his death from the 18th floor of the Aeolian Building in New York City.

The company moved to new studios in a converted ice skating rink in Walthamstow in 1913. For a time, it employed the exiled American director James Young Deer. In 1915, the company was one of several to take over British filming on the Western Front, later releasing footage as The Battle of the Somme.

The company was wound up in 1924.

== Films ==
The company filmed The Life of Shakespeare (1914), and two versions of The Taming of the Shrew, in 1915 and 1923. The first version is of historical interest for its use of a primitive sound process called Voxograph, which required offstage actors to dub the voices at the same time that the performers were filmed. The second version in 1923 is the earliest surviving British film, visualising the play in about 22 minutes, and retaining many of Shakespeare's lines as intertitles.
