= Lady Jennifer =

1908 novel by John Strange Winter

- Author: John Strange Winter
- Language: English
- Genre: Drama
- Publication date: 1908
- Publication place: United Kingdom
- Media type: Print

Lady Jennifer is a 1908 novel by British writer Henrietta Stannard, published under her pseudonym John Strange Winter. The story follows Nancy Trevor, who marries an old and wealthy baronet rather than the poor artist she loves. The baronet's malicious half-brother Hudson colludes with the baronet's butler; they threaten to expose Nancy's love letters with the artist, Dick Harrington, and cause Dick to be jailed. Eventually, Dick gets his revenge on Hudson and is able to marry Nancy. Reviews of the novel compared it favourably to Stannard's previous works, praising the engaging plot. In 1915, it was adapted into a silent film featuring Harry Royston as the butler.

== Synopsis ==
Nancy Trevor, from a humble background, falls in love with the impoverished painter Dick Harrington, but she is already engaged to the older, wealthy baronet Sir William Jennifer. She marries him out of a sense of duty and attempts to be a good wife, but not before she has exchanged incriminatingly flirtatious letters with Dick. William fires his mean-spirited valet, Reeves, for dishonesty, and Reeves acquires one of the letters. Reeves meets William's illegitimate elder half-brother Hudson, who also has a grudge against William, and the two scheme together. Reeves begins working for Dick in a ploy to gather more evidence. After an attempt to retrieve the incriminating letters, Dick is imprisoned. He remains in jail for a substantial length of time, during which William dies of natural causes. Ultimately, Dick gets his own revenge on Hudson, and he and Nancy are happily reunited.

== Publication and promotion ==
The novel was published in 1908. In England, it was sold by C.H. White for six shillings. In Australia, it was sold by George Bell & Sons. In 1910, the story was serialized in the Australian magazine The Woman's Budget. Stannard's advertisements called the book "a study in marriage", emphasizing Nancy's moral dilemma in deciding between love and duty.

To promote the book, Stannard offered signed copies by mail order, advertised with both her real name and her pen name. With the novel, she included free copies of Comely Woman, a book of advice promoting her line of cosmetics products, John Strange Winter Toilet Preparations.

== Reception ==
Stannard was known as a prolific author, and The Daily Telegraph commented that her books were "not all on the same level". Reviews compared the novel favourably to her prior works, with The Queenslander saying that "From 'Bootles' Baby' to 'Lady Jennifer' is a long call" and The Daily Telegraph concluding that "Lady Jennifer is a distinct advance on many of her books, and will not only fully satisfy her faithful readers, but revive the fidelity of any waverers". The North Mail commented that the book had come after a notable pause in activity, but the particular quality of the book would cause her fans to forgive her for the wait since "she has done nothing better than this."

Reviewers particularly praised Stannard's sympathetic character development and the book's engaging plot. According to the North Mail, "It has a plot which is quite lively, and is marked by its author's happy gift for the rapid delineation of character." The Daily Telegraph and the Tewkesbury Register emphasized the story's gripping developments, with the Telegraph calling the reading experience "thrilling" and the Register saying "the reader will not want to leave it until he has finished it." The Telegraph also commented that "she has lost none of her vivacity nor invention. Indeed [...] she is more full of ideas than ever". The Evening Standard was less glowing but still positive, saying that the novel "has an amusing, rather melodramatic plot, skilfully constructed and worked out with much easy dialogue and some fairly shaky grammar." They criticized the revenge of William's half-brother as "rather machine-made".

Several reviews also commented on the novel's ending. The Evening Standard says, "regarded as a humorous bit of poetic justice, it makes the frivolous reader's heart rejoice". The Western Morning News called the novel "[a] pleasant little story written with the author's usual fluent ease, but containing nothing original, save the very effective punishment devised for Hudson." The Tewkesbury Register called the ending "a strange act of justice".

== Film adaptation ==
Lady Jennifer was adapted into a British silent film of the same title, released in August 1915. It was directed by James Warry Vickers and starred Barbara Rutland (as Lady Jennifer) and Harry Royston (as Reeves). The International Cine Corporation produced and distributed it. The film was four reels long. It was well received, and continued to be screened through at least 1917.

The film opens with Nancy and Dick falling in love at first sight. Dick is a poor artist and Nancy's family is in financial need, so she accepts the suit of Sir William Jennifer instead. At their wedding, William's half-brother Hudson swears revenge on Nancy for cutting him out as Williams next of kin. Hudson allies with the butler Reeves, who informs him that Nancy has incriminating love letters from Dick. Reeves steals the letters for Hudson, who attempts to blackmail Nancy; she informs Dick, who breaks into Hudson's apartment and destroys the letters. Hudson has Dick jailed for housebreaking, then surprises William on his sickbed with an accusation that Nancy has been unfaithful. William dies of shock. Hudson pursues further malicious schemes. Dick is released after two years in jail and inherits an unexpected fortune. Hudson and Reeves turn against each other, allowing Dick to complete his own revenge and end the film happily with Nancy.

Contemporary film notices praised the filmmaking, with the Evening Telegraph praising its "truly artistic style" and the North Star calling it "a splendid story, graphically told." The Lincolnshire Echo praised the dramatic interest of the story, calling it "well produced, and with a plot which lends itself to the screen." They also say, "credit is due to the artistes concerned, who succeed in making the most of many powerful situations, giving the whole piece a human and realistic touch." Two years after the film's release, The Perthshire Advertiser called it "one of the best of its kind".

== Bibliography ==
- Goble, Alan. The Complete Index to Literary Sources in Film. Walter de Gruyter, 1999.
