= Harry Roberts =

Harry Roberts may refer to:

- Harry Roberts (inventor), Swedish inventor
- Rags Roberts (Harry Hamlet Roberts, 1895–1963), American Negro leagues baseball player
- Harry R. Roberts (died 1924), Australian stage actor
- Harry Roberts (doctor) (1871-1946), English doctor, author and philanthropist
- Harry Roberts (footballer, born 1904) (1904–1968), English football defender
- Harry Roberts (footballer, born 1907) (1907–1984), England international football forward
- Harry V. Roberts (1923–2004), statistician
- Harry Roberts (cricketer) (1924–1995), English cricketer
- Harry Roberts (criminal) (1936–2025), English criminal convicted of the Shepherd's Bush murders
- Harry Roberts (rugby union, born 1939), Australian international rugby union player
- Brian Roberts (English footballer) aka Harry Roberts (born 1955), Coventry and Birmingham defender
- Harry Roberts (rugby union, born 1960), South African international rugby union player

== See also ==
- Henry Roberts (disambiguation)
- Harold Roberts (disambiguation)
