= The Heart of Midlothian (film) =

- Directed by: Frank Wilson
- Written by: Sir Walter Scott (novel); Blanche McIntosh
- Starring: Flora Morris; Violet Hopson; Alma Taylor
- Production company: Hepworth Pictures
- Distributed by: Hepworth Pictures
- Release date: April 1914
- Country: United Kingdom
- Languages: Silent; English intertitles

The Heart of Midlothian is a 1914 British silent historical film directed by Frank Wilson and starring Flora Morris, Violet Hopson and Alma Taylor. It is an adaptation of Sir Walter Scott's 1818 novel The Heart of Midlothian.

The American company Famous Players released a rival film in May 1914 on the same subject called A Woman's Triumph.

== Cast ==
- Flora Morris as Effie Deans
- Violet Hopson as Jeanie Deans
- Alma Taylor as Madge Wildfire
- Stewart Rome as The Outlaw
- Cecil Mannering as George Staunton
- Cyril Morton as Reuben Butler
- Harry Gilbey as Duke of Argyll
- Warwick Buckland as Davie Deans
- Marie de Solla as Old Margery
- Harry Royston as Bartoline Saddletree
- Harry Buss as The Officer
- Hay Plumb as Fiscal Sharpitlaw
- John MacAndrews as The Gaoler

== Bibliography ==
- Palmer, Scott. British Film Actors' Credits, 1895-1987. McFarland, 1988.
