= Adrift on Life's Tide =

1913 British silent film by Warwick Buckland

- Directed by: Warwick Buckland
- Written by: Warwick Buckland
- Starring: Alma Taylor; Flora Morris; Harry Royston
- Production company: Hepworth Company
- Distributed by: Hepworth Company
- Release date: July 1913
- Country: United Kingdom
- Languages: Silent; English intertitles

Adrift on Life's Tide is a 1913 British silent drama film directed by Warwick Buckland and starring Alma Taylor, Flora Morris and Harry Royston.

== Plot summary ==
A drunkard's daughter is adopted, rejected, becomes a dancer, and spurns wealth for love.

== Cast ==
- Alma Taylor as Edna Wilson
- Flora Morris as Mrs. Wilson
- Harry Royston as Mr. Wilson
- Harry Gilbey as The Rich Man

== Bibliography ==
- Palmer, Scott. British Film Actors' Credits, 1895-1987. McFarland, 1988.
