= The Shadows of a Great City =

The Shadows of a Great City may refer to:

- The Shadows of a Great City (play), an 1884 play by Herbert Blaché and Aaron Hoffman
- Shadows of a Great City, a 1913 British film adaptation
- The Shadows of a Great City (film), a 1915 American film adaptation
