= Henry Roberts =

Henry Roberts may refer to:

- Henry Roberts (fl. 1606), English writer
- Henry Roberts (Royal Navy officer) (1756–1796), served with Captain Cook
- Henry Roberts (architect) (1803–1876), architect of Fish Hall
- Henry Roberts (cricketer) (1888–1963), English first class cricketer
- Henry Roberts (engraver), English engraver in the 18th-century
- Henry Roberts (governor) (1853–1929), American politician and Governor of Connecticut
- Henry Roberts (rugby union) (1862–1949), New Zealand rugby player
- Henry B. Roberts, American politician
- Henry Gee Roberts (1800–1860), major general and political agent in India
- Harry R. Roberts (Henry Richard Roberts, died 1924), Australian stage actor
- Harry Roberts (footballer, born 1907) (Henry Roberts, 1907–1984), English footballer
- B. H. Roberts (1857–1933), English-born Mormon leader
- Ed Roberts (computer engineer) (Henry Edward Roberts, 1941–2010), American computer pioneer

== See also ==
- Harry Roberts (disambiguation)
