= A Park Lane Scandal =

- Directed by: Warwick Buckland
- Written by: Warwick Buckland
- Starring: Flora Morris; Joseph R. Tozer; Harry Gilbey
- Production companies: Michaelson Productions; Venus Films Productions
- Distributed by: Gerrard Film Company
- Release date: August 1915
- Country: United Kingdom
- Languages: Silent; English intertitles

A Park Lane Scandal is a 1915 British silent drama film directed by Warwick Buckland and starring Flora Morris, Joseph R. Tozer and Harry Gilbey.

== Cast ==
- Flora Morris as The Woman
- Joseph R. Tozer as The Man
- Austin Camp
- Harry Gilbey
- Sybil Wollaston
- J.H. Lewis

== Bibliography ==
- Palmer, Scott. British Film Actors' Credits, 1895-1987. McFarland, 1988.
