= After Dark (Boucicault play) =

1868 melodramatic play with copyright controversy

After Dark or After Dark: A Tale of London Life is an 1868 melodramatic play by the Irish writer Dion Boucicault. It includes a scene where a character is tied up on railroad tracks as a train approaches. Boucicault was successfully sued for copyright infringement by Augustin Daly, whose play Under the Gaslight featured a similar scene the year before.

== Film adaptations ==
The play was turned into two films in 1915. An American film After Dark starring Eric Maxon and the British After Dark directed by Warwick Buckland.

== Bibliography ==
- Goble, Alan (1999). The Complete Index to Literary Sources in Film. Walter de Gruyter. ISBN 1-85739-229-9.
- Strand, Ginger (2005). "Daily, [John] Augustin". In Serafin, Steven R.; Bendixen, Alfred (eds.). The Continuum Encyclopedia of American Literature. Continuum. ISBN 0-8264-1517-2.
