= Lady Jennifer (film) =

- Directed by: James Warry Vickers
- Written by: John Strange Winter (novel)
- Starring: Barbara Rutland; Harry Royston
- Production company: International Cine Corporation
- Distributed by: International Cine Corporation
- Release date: August 1915
- Country: United Kingdom
- Languages: Silent; English intertitles

Lady Jennifer is a 1915 British silent drama film directed by James Warry Vickers and starring Barbara Rutland and Harry Royston. The film was an adaptation of the 1908 novel of the same title by John Strange Winter.

Lady Jennifer was four reels long. It was well received, and continued to be screened through at least 1917.

== Cast ==
- Barbara Rutland as Lady Jennifer
- Harry Royston as Reeves

== Plot ==
The film opens with Nancy and Dick falling in love at first sight. Dick is a poor artist and Nancy's family is in financial need, so she accepts the suit of Sir William Jennifer instead. At their wedding, William's half-brother Hudson swears revenge on Nancy for cutting him out as Williams next of kin. Hudson allies with the butler Reeves, who informs him that Nancy's has incriminating love letters from Dick. Reeves steals the letters for Hudson, who attempts to blackmail Nancy; she informs Dick, who breaks into Hudson's apartment and destroys the letters. Hudson has Dick jailed for housebreaking, then surprises William on his sickbed with an accusation that Nancy has been unfaithful. William dies of shock. Hudson pursues further malicious schemes. Dick is released after two years in jail and inherits an unexpected fortune. Hudson and Reeves turn against each other, allowing Dick to complete his own revenge and end the film happily with Nancy.

== Reception ==
Contemporary film notices praised the filmmaking, with the Evening Telegraph praising its "truly artistic style" and the North Star calling it "a splendid story, graphically told." The Lincolnshire Echo praised the dramatic interest of the story, calling it "well produced, and with a plot which lends itself to the screen." They also say, "credit is due to the artistes concerned, who succeed in making the most of many powerful situations, giving the whole piece a human and realistic touch." Two years after the film's release, The Perthshire Advertiser called it "one of the best of its kind".

== Bibliography ==
- Goble, Alan. The Complete Index to Literary Sources in Film. Walter de Gruyter, 1999.
