= Kissing Cup's Race =

Kissing Cup's Race may refer to:

- Kissing Cup's Race (poem), a poem by Campbell Rae Brown
- Kissing Cup's Race (1920 film), British silent film directed by Walter West
- Kissing Cup's Race (1930 film), British sound film directed by Castleton Knight

== See also ==
- Kissing Cup, a 1913 film
- Son of Kissing Cup, a 1922 film
