= Eugene Aram (1924 film) =

1924 film

- Directed by: Arthur Rooke
- Written by: Kinchen Wood
- Based on: Eugene Aram by Edward George Bulwer-Lytton
- Produced by: I.B. Davidson
- Starring: Arthur Wontner; Barbara Hoffe; Mary Odette
- Production company: I.B. Davidson Productions
- Distributed by: Granger
- Release date: 28 February 1924
- Country: United Kingdom
- Languages: Silent; English intertitles

Eugene Aram is a 1924 British silent drama film directed by Arthur Rooke and starring Arthur Wontner, Barbara Hoffe, and Mary Odette. It was based on the 1832 novel Eugene Aram by Edward Bulwer-Lytton, which depicts the life of the 18th-century criminal Eugene Aram.

== Cast ==
- Arthur Wontner as Eugene Aram
- Barbara Hoffe as Madeleine Lester
- Mary Odette as Elinor Lester
- James Carew as Richard Houseman
- C. V. France as Squire Lester
- Walter Tennyson as Walter Lester
- Lionel d'Aragon as Daniel Clarke
- A. Bromley Davenport as Cpl. Bunting
- William Matthews as John Courtland
