= Maggie Moore =

Australian actress

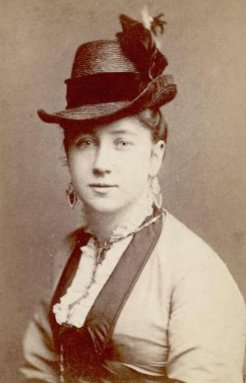
- Maggie Moore in the 1870s
- Born: Margaret Virginia Sullivan; April 10, 1851; San Francisco, California, U.S.
- Died: March 15, 1926 (aged 74); San Francisco, California, U.S.
- Occupations: Actress, opera singer
- Years active: 1873-1925
- Spouse(s): J. C. Williamson (married 1873 – divorced 1899); Harry R. Roberts (married 1902–1924 husband's death)

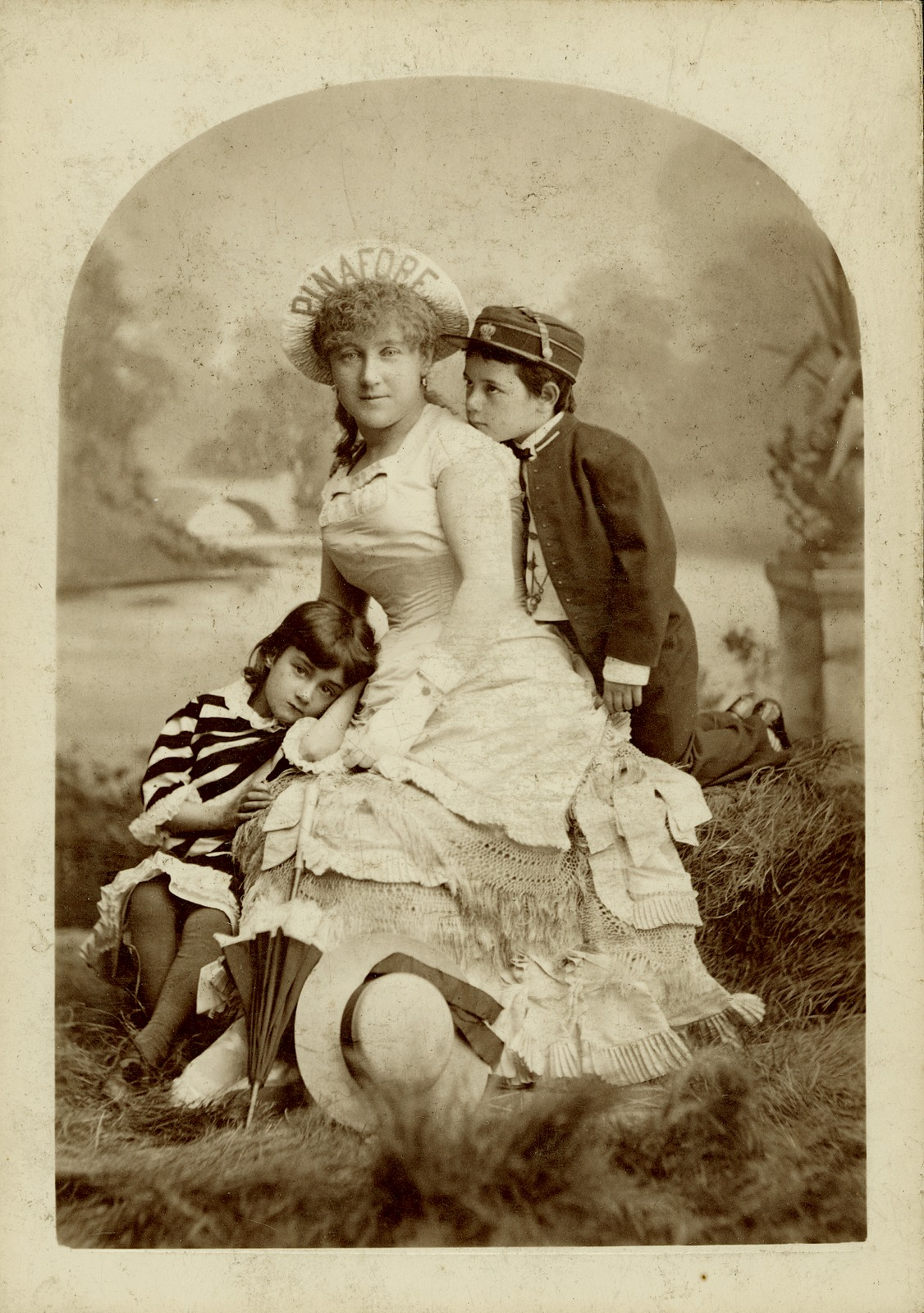
Moore in costume with child actors in H.M.S. Pinafore, c. 1879

Maggie Moore (April 10, 1851 – March 15, 1926) was an American-Australian actress born as Margaret Virginia Sullivan.

Moore met and married theatre impresario J. C. Williamson in the U.S. and became popular as an actress in their production of Struck Oil, which premiered in 1873 and was revived many times. Soon after their marriage, they took the play on a tour of Australia. It was such a success that they stayed there, where he founded the most successful theatrical company in Australia, and she became a leading actress.

Moore was also successful in Williamson's Gilbert and Sullivan operas, other operetta productions, and a range of other stage pieces. Over the next fifty years, she continued a busy acting career in Australia and on tour worldwide, ending her marriage with Williamson and later marrying actor Harry R. Roberts. She retired to her native San Francisco in 1925.

== Early life and career ==
Moore was born in San Francisco, California, in 1851 to Irish parents; her father, who died when she was eight years old, was from Dublin, and her mother was from Galway. She began performing as a child. She had seven siblings, six sisters and one brother, some of whom also appeared on the stage.

Moore married J. C. Williamson in 1872, and the pair married at St. Mary's Cathedral in San Francisco on 2 February 1873. Later that month, they starred together in a melodrama called Struck Oil in Salt Lake City, Utah. The couple travelled to Australia in 1874 and opened a season at the Theatre Royal, Melbourne, on 1 August, in Struck Oil and were immediately successful. Its run of 43 nights was the longest yet known in the colonial theatre. It proved equally popular around the rest of the country. What was meant to be a 12-week tour of Australia ended up lasting a profitable fifteen months (including Struck Oil and other pieces). Williamson used the proceeds to launch his career as a theatre manager, and Moore became one of the most popular performers on the Australian stage. They played seasons in Australia and toured extensively with several pieces, including Struck Oil and Arrah-na-Pogue, to India, the US, Europe, Britain and elsewhere through the 1870s.

In 1879, Williamson acquired the exclusive right to perform H.M.S. Pinafore in Australia and New Zealand, and subsequently the other Gilbert and Sullivan operas. He and Moore began their 1879–80 Australian season with Struck Oil and staged the first legitimate Australian production of Pinafore at the Theatre Royal Sydney in November. Moore played Josephine opposite her husband as Sir Joseph. Praising the production, Williamson and Moore, the Sydney Morning Herald commented that the production, though "abounding in fun", was dignified and precise, especially compared with a previous "boisterous" unauthorised production, and that the laughter and applause from the "immense audience ... was liberally bestowed". In ensuing years, Moore sometimes played Buttercup in Pinafore; the role of either Mabel or Ruth in The Pirates of Penzance on different occasions; Lady Jane in Patience and Bettina (the title role) in La mascotte. Later, she also played in dramas.

By the late 1880s, she was playing such roles as Biddy Roonan in The Shadows of a Great City (1886) and the title role in Meg the Castaway (1890). She left her husband in the early 1890s, and they divorced by the end of the decade. On a visit to San Francisco, she performed at a benefit in Nan the Good-for-Nothing by J. B. Buckstone; she continued to revive Struck Oil in Australia. The divorce was bitter, and Williamson tried unsuccessfully to stop her from appearing in Struck Oil, which she continued to revive throughout her career; she starred in the 1919 film version in her late 60s.

== 20th century ==
Shortly after she married for the second time in 1902, to Harry R. Roberts, she toured Australia (July 1902 to July 1903), New Zealand (July to November 1903) and then Australia again (December 1903 to July 1904), with a repertoire of comedies and comedic melodramas, including Struck Oil. Over the next several years, she travelled in the United States and Great Britain. In London she appeared with George Graves and Billie Burke, among others. From 1908 to 1912, in Australia, she and Roberts played seasons of Struck Oil, among other appearances; they released a film adaptation in 1919.

Beginning in 1915, rejoining Williamson's Royal Comic Opera Company, she played character roles including Mrs Karl Pfeiffer in Friendly Enemies (1918), earning warm reviews. When not touring, her home was a cottage called "Francisco" in Rose Bay, Sydney, where she kept a number of animals. In 1920 she played in the "mystery musical comedy" F.F.F., which toured in Australia. In 1920–21, she played Mahbubah in the first Australian production of Chu Chin Chow alongside C. H. Workman. She played Lizzie Stofel in Struck Oil as her last stage performance in 1924.

Moore retired to California in 1925, residing with her sister, Mrs Comstock. In her more than fifty years on the Australian and other stages, her roles ranged from comic opera to melodrama, comedy, drama and the dame characters in pantomime, and she was skilled at step-dancing She died in San Francisco, after having an operation to remove her leg, following a cable car accident on March 15, 1926, aged 74. Her second husband predeceased her. She was interred at Holy Cross Cemetery in Colma, California.

== Sources ==
- Serle, Percival (1949). "Moore, Maggie". Dictionary of Australian Biography. Sydney: Angus & Robertson.
