= Hoffe =

Hoffe (also spelled Höffe) may refer to:

== Surname ==
- Barbara Hoffe, British stage actress
- Esther Hoffe (1906-2007), Israeli secretary of Max Brod
- Monckton Hoffe (1880-1951), Irish playwright and screenwriter
- Otfried Höffe (born 1943), German philosopher and professor

== Place ==
- Hoffe (Nordenham), German farming community
