= Eric Maxon =

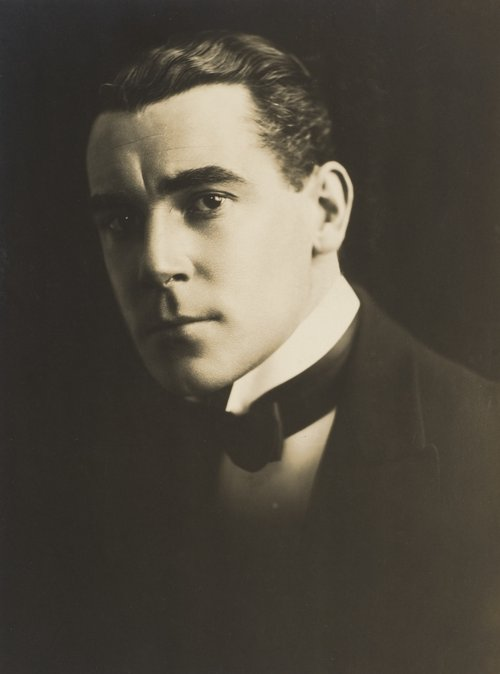
Eric Maxon in 1912

Eric Maxon (22 May 1882 – 1963) was an English stage and early film actor and member of the Royal Shakespeare Company for whom, for a period, he also designed the costumes.

He was born as Eric MacKay in Balham in London in 1882, the son of stockbroker Charles Stewart MacKay. As Eric Maxon he joined the company of H.B. Irving in 1907 and with whom he toured Britain in The Lyons Mail, The Bells and Charles I, plays made memorable by Irving's father Henry Irving. From 1909 to 1910 Maxon appeared with the company of actor-manager Frank Benson in The School for Scandal. In 1912 he appeared in the stage play Ben-Hur in Australia.

Maxon joined the Royal Shakespeare Company for their 1910–11 season, appearing in The Taming of the Shrew, Hamlet, The School for Scandal, The Winter's Tale, Macbeth, Julius Caesar, As You Like It, Hamlet, The Merry Wives of Windsor, The Merchant of Venice, among other plays. He appeared in the silent films Richard III (1911) as Henry, Earl of Richmond and played Capt. Gordon Chadley in After Dark (1915).

His appearances on Broadway included The White Feather (Comedy Theatre, 1915), Romeo and Juliet (44th Street Theatre, 1915). In a 1916 season at the (New Amsterdam Theatre he appeared in Henry VIII, The Merchant of Venice and The Merry Wives of Windsor. Further appearances included The Lost Leader (Greenwich Village Theatre, 1919), The Purple Mask (Booth Theatre, 1920), and The Skylark (Belmont Theatre, 1921).

He rejoined the Royal Shakespeare Company for their 1924 season, and remained with that company for the next twenty years, both as actor, and in the early 1930s, as costume designer. Among other plays during that period Maxon appeared in Othello, Macbeth, The Merchant of Venice, Coriolanus, Antony and Cleopatra, All's Well That Ends Well, Romeo and Juliet, and Cymbeline. Maxon appeared in the title role in Julius Caesar (1934), and, in the 1943 season at the Shakespeare Memorial Theatre in Stratford-upon-Avon he played Antonio in Twelfth Night, Montano in Othello, Theseus in A Midsummer Night's Dream, the Duke of Exeter in Henry V, Shallow in The Merry Wives of Windsor, the Earl of Gloucester in King Lear, Antigonus in The Winter's Tale, and the Earl of Leicester in The Critic. In 1947 Maxon opened on Broadway at the New Century Theatre, playing the Earl of Gloucester in King Lear, Corbaccio in Volpone, and Polonius in Hamlet, in a production which transferred from the 1943–44 season at the Scala Theatre in London. In 1951 he played Andrew MacKeith in the J. C. Williamson production of Brigadoon.

In 1939 he was living in Paddington in London.

Eric Maxon died in Finsbury in London in 1963. He never married.

== Media ==
Maxon appears on the DVD Silent Shakespeare (2013), consisting of seven tinted short films which were the first attempts to bring the works of Shakespeare to the cinema screen, taken from the National Film and Television Archive Collection.
