= With All Her Heart =

1920 film directed by Frank Wilson

- Directed by: Frank Wilson
- Starring: Milton Rosmer; Mary Odette; Jack Vincent; Harry Gilbey
- Production company: I.B. Davidson
- Distributed by: Ruffells Films
- Release date: June 1920
- Running time: 5,000 feet
- Country: United Kingdom
- Languages: Silent; English intertitles

With All Her Heart is a 1920 British silent drama film directed by Frank Wilson and starring Milton Rosmer, Mary Odette and Jack Vincent. It was based on the 1901 novel by the popular writer Charles Garvice. Many reviewers recommended the film on the strength of the original book.

== Cast ==
- Milton Rosmer as Geoffrey Bell
- Mary Odette as Cottie
- Jack Vincent as Sidney Bassington
- J. Hastings Batson as Earl of Stanborough
- Harry Gilbey as Solicitor

== Bibliography ==
- Bamford, Kenton. Distorted Images: British National Identity and Film in the 1920s. I.B. Tauris, 1999.
- Low, Rachael. History of the British Film, 1918-1929. George Allen & Unwin, 1971.
