= Jealousy (1929 film) =

1929 film

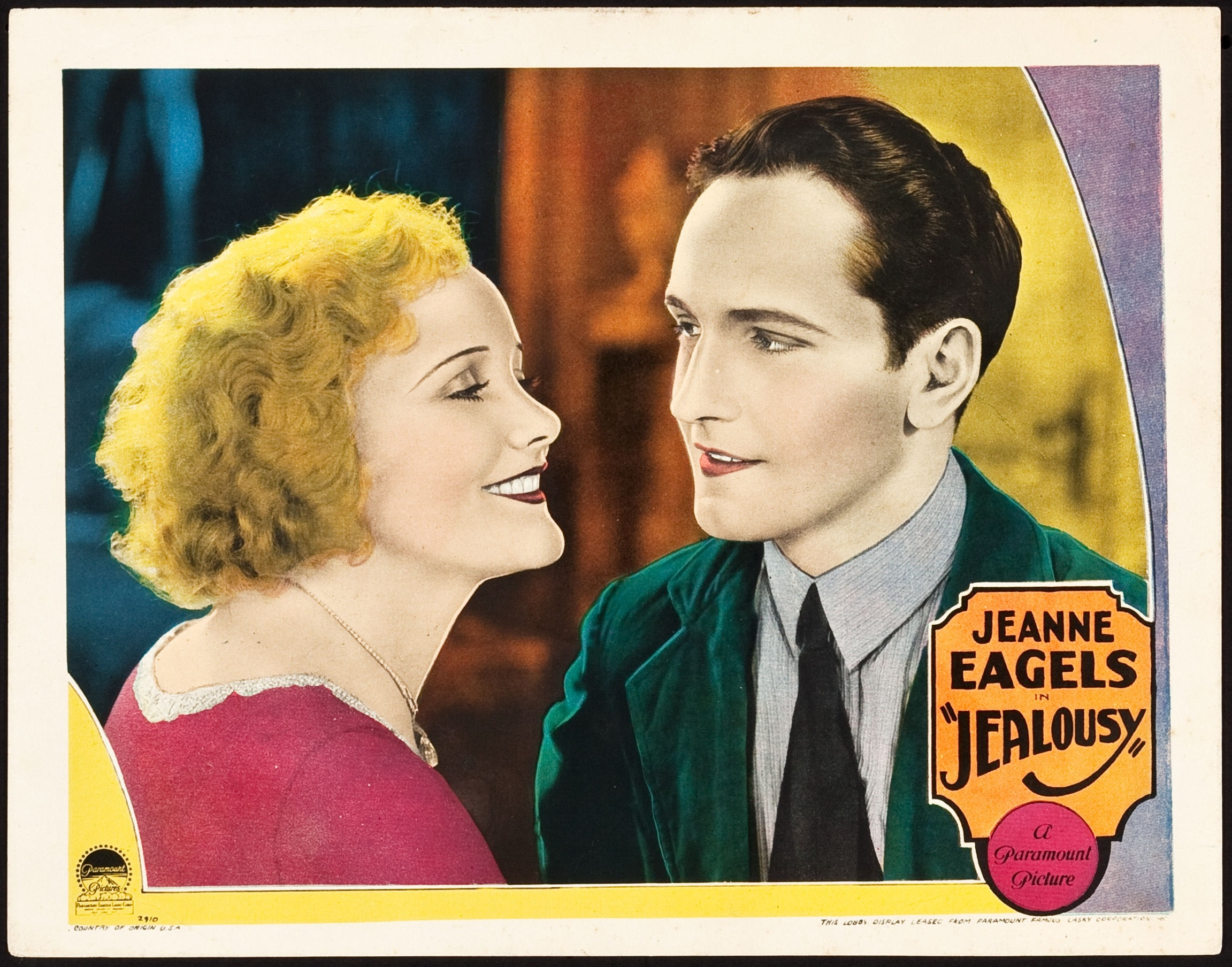
- Lobby card
- Directed by: Jean de Limur
- Written by: Garrett Fort (adaptation); Eugene Walter; John D. Williams
- Based on: Monsieur Lamberthier by Louis Verneuil
- Starring: Jeanne Eagels; Fredric March
- Cinematography: Alfred Gilks
- Distributed by: Paramount Pictures
- Release date: September 13, 1929
- Running time: 66 minutes
- Country: United States
- Language: English

Jealousy is a 1929 American pre-Code drama film directed by Jean de Limur and released by Paramount Pictures. It is based on the French play Monsieur Lamberthier, by Louis Verneuil. The play was translated by Eugene Walter and ran on Broadway under the title Jealousy in 1928. The film version starred Jeanne Eagels and Fredric March, and is the second sound film and final motion picture featuring Eagels.

The film was initially shot with British actor Anthony Bushell as Pierre, but he was replaced by March at Eagels' insistence. Supporting actress Hilda Moore died before Jealousy was released, while the film's star, Jeanne Eagels, died of an overdose of chloral hydrate one month after the film was released.

== Plot ==
Yvonne (Eagels), a Paris gown shop owner, who marries a struggling artist named Pierre (March). However, she keeps a secret from him: an earlier affair with Rigaud (Hobbes), an older, wealthy man who financed her business. Later, facing financial difficulties, Yvonne seeks help from Rigaud only to find him murdered. Pierre confesses to the murder to protect Clement (Daniell), an innocent man who is suspected, and whose girlfriend Rigaud has wronged. Pierre is arrested, expecting a lenient sentence.

== Cast ==
- Jeanne Eagels as Yvonne
- Fredric March as Pierre
- Halliwell Hobbes as Rigaud
- Blanche Le Clair as Renee
- Henry Daniell as Clement
- Hilda Moore as Charlotte
- Carlotta Coerr as Louise
- Granville Bates as Lawyer
- Virginia Chauvenet as Maid

== Preservation status ==
No prints of Jealousy are known to exist and it is now considered lost.

== See also ==
- List of early sound feature films (1926–1929)
