= A Dead Certainty =

1920 British film by George Dewhurst

- Directed by: George Dewhurst
- Written by: Nat Gould; P.L. Mannock
- Produced by: Walter West
- Starring: Gregory Scott; Poppy Wyndham; Cameron Carr; Harry Royston
- Release date: 1920
- Country: United Kingdom

A Dead Certainty is a 1920 British silent sports drama film directed by George Dewhurst and starring Gregory Scott, Poppy Wyndham and Cameron Carr. It was based on a novel by Nathaniel Gould. A jockey comes under pressure from his girlfriend's relations to fix a horse race.

== Cast ==
- Gregory Scott as Arthur Dunbar
- Poppy Wyndham as Pat Stone
- Cameron Carr as Henry Stone
- Harry Royston as Martin Mills
- Mary Masters as Mrs. Woodruff
- Wallace Bosco

== See also ==
- List of films about horses
- List of films about horse racing

== Bibliography ==
- Low, Rachael. The History of British Film, Volume 4 1918-1929. Routledge, 1997.
