= Flora Morris =

British actress

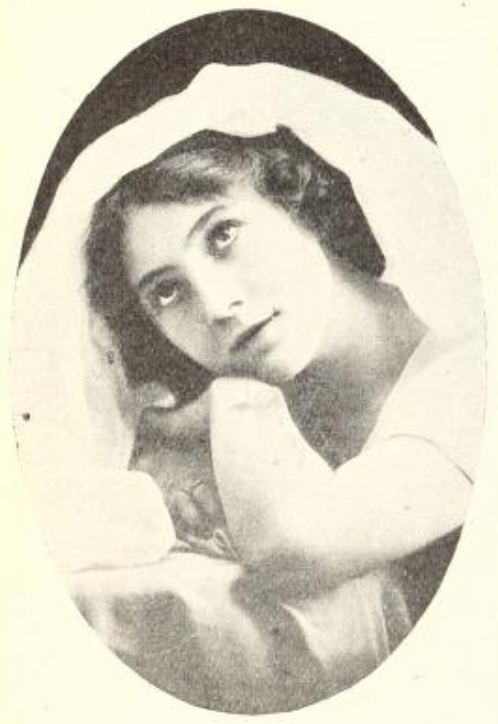
- Flora Morris, from a 1913 publication
- Occupation: Actress
- Years active: 1910 - 1916 (film)

Flora Morris was a British stage and film actress. She played the lead in the 1915 crime film After Dark.

== Selected filmography ==
- Oliver Twist (1912)
- Adrift on Life's Tide (1913)
- Kissing Cup (1913)
- The Heart of Midlothian (1914)
- Mysteries of London (1915)
- After Dark (1915)
- A Park Lane Scandal (1915)
- Whoso Is Without Sin (1916)

== Bibliography ==
- Goble, Alan. The Complete Index to Literary Sources in Film. Walter de Gruyter, 1999.
