= Hay Fever (play) =

Comic play by Noël Coward

Marie Tempest as Judith with Robert Andrews and Helen Spencer as her children, 1925

Hay Fever is a comic play written by Noël Coward in 1924. Its first production was in the West End in 1925 with Marie Tempest as Judith Bliss. A cross between high farce and a comedy of manners, the play is set in an English country house in the 1920s, and deals with the four eccentric members of the Bliss family and their outlandish behaviour when they each invite a guest to spend the weekend. The self-centred behaviour of the hosts finally drives their guests to flee while the Blisses are so engaged in a family row that they do not notice their guests' furtive departure.

The play's original production opened in London in 1925 and ran for 337 performances. Coward wrote the piece with Tempest in mind for the central role of Judith. In later productions the part has been played by such actresses as Constance Collier, Edith Evans, Constance Cummings, Rosemary Harris, Judi Dench, Geraldine McEwan and Felicity Kendal. Hay Fever has been continually revived in Britain, the US and elsewhere, and has been adapted frequently for radio and television.

== Background ==
In 1921 Coward first visited New York, hoping to interest American producers in his plays. During that summer he became a friend of the playwright Hartley Manners and his wife, the eccentric actress Laurette Taylor. Coward wrote, "It was inevitable that someone should eventually utilise portions of this eccentricity in a play, and I am only grateful to Fate that no guest of the Hartley Manners thought of writing Hay Fever before I did". Coward's biographer Philip Hoare and others also note elements of Evangeline Astley Cooper – an English eccentric of whom the young Coward was a protégé – in the central character, Judith Bliss. (Note: Evangeline Julia Marshall, eccentric society hostess (1854–1944), married Clement Paston Astley Cooper, grandson of Sir Astley Paston Cooper, on 10 July 1877. She inherited Hambleton Hall from her brother Walter Marshall on his death in 1899, and there she entertained rising talents in the artistic world, including, in addition to Coward, the painter Philip Streatfeild, the conductor Malcolm Sargent, and the writer Charles Scott Moncrieff, who dedicated his translation of Proust's Swann's Way to her. When staying with the Astley Coopers, Coward kept careful notes of what his hostess said and how she said it, and much of the dialogue for Hay Fever (and other early Coward plays) appears to be derived directly from these notes. She said she went to his plays "because it amuses me to hear my remarks put into the mouths of actors".) The two women reacted very differently to Coward's caricature of them. Taylor was offended (either by Coward's Judith or the overplaying of the role in the Broadway production, or both), and Cooper was much amused.

Coward wrote the play in three days in 1924, at first giving it the title Still Life before adopting Hay Fever prior to the first production. (Note: Coward retained a liking for the earlier title and used it for one of the plays – a serious one – in his cycle Tonight at 8.30 in 1936.) He intended the star role, Judith, for the actress Marie Tempest, "whom I revered and adored". Though she found it amusing, she thought it not substantial enough for a whole evening, but changed her mind after the success of Coward's The Vortex later in 1924.

Coward introduces one of his signature theatrical devices at the end of the play, where the four guests tiptoe out as the curtain falls, leaving disorder behind them – a device that he also used in various forms in Present Laughter, Private Lives and Blithe Spirit.

== Original productions ==
Hay Fever opened at the Ambassadors Theatre on 8 June 1925, directed by Coward, and transferred to the larger Criterion Theatre on 7 September 1925; it ran for 337 performances. Coward remembered in 1964 that the notices "were amiable and well-disposed although far from effusive. It was noted, as indeed it has been today, that the play had no plot and that there were few if any 'witty' lines." Hay Fever opened the same year at the Maxine Elliott Theatre in New York; the star, Laura Hope Crews, was accused of over-acting, (Note: Alexander Woollcott wrote, "Laura Hope Crews was permitted to give one of the most disastrous performances I have ever seen in all my life".) not all the supporting cast were competent, and the production closed after 49 performances.

The original casts in London and New York were:

Coward in 1925

Roles	Ambassadors Theatre, London	Maxine Elliott Theatre, New York
Sorel Bliss	Helen Spencer	Frieda Inescort
Simon Bliss	Robert Andrews	Gavin Muir
Clara	Minnie Rayner	Alice Belmore Cliffe
Judith Bliss	Marie Tempest	Laura Hope Crews
David Bliss	W. Graham Brown	Harry Davenport
Richard Greatham	Athole Stewart	George Thorpe
Sandy Tyrell	Patrick Susands	Reginald Sheffield
Myra Arundel	Hilda Moore	Phyllis Joyce
Jackie Coryton	Ann Trevor	Margot Lester

== Plot ==
The action is set in the Hall of David Bliss's house at Cookham, Berkshire, by the River Thames.

=== Act I ===
A Saturday afternoon in June

Judith Bliss (Marie Tempest) strikes a pose, 1925

Sorel and Simon Bliss, a brother and sister, exchange artistic and bohemian dialogue. Judith, their mother, displays the absent-minded theatricality of a retired star actress, and David, their father, a novelist, is concentrating on finishing his latest book. Each of the four members of the Bliss family, without consulting the others, has invited a guest for the weekend. Judith announces that she has decided to return to the stage in one of her old hits, Love's Whirlwind. She and Sorel and Simon amuse themselves acting out a melodramatic passage from the play beginning, "Is this a game?" "Yes, and a game that must be played to the finish!" They are interrupted by the ringing of the doorbell.

Clara, Judith's former dresser and now her housekeeper, opens the door to the first of the four guests, Sandy Tyrell, a sporty fan of Judith's. The next arrival is the vampish Myra Arundel, whom Simon has invited. The other two guests arrive together: Richard Greatham, a diplomat, and Jackie Coryton, a brainless but good-hearted young flapper. Tea is served. Conversation is stilted and eventually grinds to a halt. The scene ends in total and awkward silence.

=== Act II ===
After dinner that night

The family insists that everyone should join in a parlour game, a variety of charades in which one person must guess the adverb being acted out by the others. The Blisses are in their element, but the guests flounder and the game breaks up. Simon and Jackie exit to the garden, Sorel drags Sandy into the library, and David takes Myra outside.

Left alone with Richard, Judith flirts with him, and when he chastely kisses her she theatrically over-reacts as though they were conducting a serious affair. She nonplusses Richard by talking of breaking the news to David. She in turn is nonplussed to discover Sandy and Sorel kissing in the library. That too has been mere flirtation, but both Judith and Sorel enjoy themselves by exaggerating it. Judith gives a performance nobly renouncing her claim on Sandy, and exits. Sorel explains to Sandy that she was just playing the theatrical game for Judith's benefit, as "one always plays up to Mother in this house; it's a sort of unwritten law." They leave.

David and Myra enter. They too indulge in a little light flirtation, at the height of which Judith enters and finds them kissing. She makes a theatrical scene, with which David dutifully plays along. Simon rushes in violently, announcing that he and Jackie are engaged. Sorel and Sandy enter from the library, Judith goes into yet another bout of over-theatrical emoting. In the ensuing uproar, Richard asks "Is this a game?" Judith, Sorel and Simon seize on this cue from Love's Whirlwind and trot out the melodramatic dialogue as they had in Act I. David is overcome with laughter and the uncomprehending guests are dazed and aghast as Judith ends the scene by falling to the floor as if in a faint.

=== Act III ===
The next morning

Act III: the guests make their escape, 1925 production

A breakfast table has been laid in the hall. Sandy enters and begins eating nervously. At the sound of someone approaching he escapes into the library. Jackie enters, helps herself to some breakfast and bursts into tears. Sandy comes out and they discuss how uncomfortable they were the night before and how mad the Bliss family are. When they hear people approaching, they both retreat to the library. Myra and Richard now enter and begin breakfast. Their conversation mirrors that of Sandy and Jackie, who emerge from the library to join them. All four decide that they are going to return to London without delay. Sandy agrees to drive them in his motor car. They go upstairs to collect their things.

Judith comes down, asks Clara for the Sunday papers and begins reading aloud what the gossip columns say about her. The rest of her family enter. David proposes to read them the final chapter of his novel. Immediately, a minor detail about the geography of Paris is blown into a full-scale family row, with everyone talking at once about whether the Rue Saint-Honoré does or does not connect with the Place de la Concorde and hurling insults at each other. They are so wrapped up in their private row that they do not notice when the four visitors tiptoe down the stairs and out of the house. The Blisses are only momentarily distracted when the slam of the door alerts them to the flight of their guests. Judith comments, "How very rude!" and David adds, "People really do behave in the most extraordinary manner these days." Then, with no further thought of their four tormented guests, they happily return to David's manuscript and to what passes for their normal family life.

== Revivals ==
=== West End ===
The first London revival was in 1933 at the Shaftesbury Theatre with Constance Collier as Judith. In 1941 the piece was revived at the Vaudeville Theatre in a repertory series of English comedies.

A 1964 production at The Old Vic was the National Theatre Company's first production by a living author. It was directed by Coward, and starred Edith Evans as Judith. The rest of the cast comprised Derek Jacobi as Simon, Maggie Smith as Myra, Barbara Hicks as Clara, Anthony Nicholls as David, Robert Stephens as Sandy, Robert Lang as Richard, and Lynn Redgrave as Jackie. After being invited to direct the production, Coward wrote, "I am thrilled and flattered and frankly a little flabbergasted that the National Theatre should have had the curious perceptiveness to choose a very early play of mine and to give it a cast that could play the Albanian telephone directory." The last London revival in Coward's lifetime was at the Duke of York's Theatre in 1968, with Celia Johnson as Judith and a cast including Roland Culver, Simon Williams, Richard Vernon and Prunella Scales.

A revival at the Queen's Theatre in 1983 starred Penelope Keith as Judith, with a cast including Moray Watson, Donald Pickering and Abigail McKern. A 1992 revival at the Albery Theatre starred Maria Aitken as Judith, with a cast including Abigail Cruttenden, Maria Charles, John Standing, Carmen du Sautoy, Christopher Godwin and Sara Crowe. A 1999 Savoy Theatre cast starred Geraldine McEwan as Judith, with Monica Dolan, Stephen Mangan, Peter Blythe, Sylvestra Le Touzel, Malcolm Sinclair, and Cathryn Bradshaw. The 2006 Haymarket Theatre cast included Kim Medcalf as Sorel, Dan Stevens as Simon, Judi Dench as Judith, Peter Bowles as David, Charles Edwards as Sandy, and Belinda Lang as Myra. The following UK tour, in 2007, cast Stephanie Beacham as Judith, Christopher Timothy as David, William Ellis as Simon, Christopher Naylor as Sandy, and Andrew Hall as Richard.

A 2012 revival at the Noël Coward Theatre included in the cast Lindsay Duncan as Judith, Jeremy Northam as Richard, Kevin McNally as David, Olivia Colman as Myra, Sam Callis as Sandy, Freddie Fox as Simon, Amy Morgan as Jackie, Phoebe Waller-Bridge as Sorrel, and Jenny Galloway as Clara. The 2014 touring production transferred to the Duke of York's Theatre in 2015.

A revival at Wyndham's Theatre, directed by Emily Burns, began in September 2026, starring Christine Baranski (in her West End debut) as Judith and Richard E. Grant as David. The production also stars Nancy Carroll as Myra, Will Close as Simon, Charles Edwards as Richard, Ophelia Lovibond as Sorel, Ash Hunter as Sandy, Lucy Karczewski as Jackie, and Jo McInnes as Clara. It is expected to close in December 2026. A live film of the production is expected to be released in cinemas by National Theatre Live from 14 January 2027.

=== Other UK productions ===
While the play continued its first West End run, Eva Moore headed the cast in a touring production, which played to what The Stage called "phenomenal business" around Britain. Phyllis Calvert headed the cast in a UK tour of Hay Fever in 1975. A production directed by Michael Blakemore opened at the Lyric Theatre, Hammersmith in 1980 starring Constance Cummings as Judith. In 1988 Googie Withers starred in a revival at the Chichester Festival Theatre. Dora Bryan played Judith in a UK tour in 1989. A production by Alan Strachan opened at the Theatr Clwyd in October 1992 and transferred to the West End the following month (see above). In 2010, Celia Imrie played Judith at the Rose Theatre, Kingston, succeeded later in the run by Nichola McAuliffe. In 2014 Felicity Kendal starred as Judith in a UK tour with Simon Shepherd as David, Sara Stewart as Myra, Celeste Dodwell as Jackie, and Alice Orr-Ewing as Sorrel.

=== North America ===
Collier played Judith in a 1931 revival at Avon Theatre in New York. In 1937 John Craven starred in the play at Harold Lloyd's Beverly Hills Little Theatre for Professionals. In a 1970 revival at the Helen Hayes Theatre, New York, the cast included Roberta Maxwell as Sorel, Sam Waterston as Simon, Sudie Bond as Clara, Shirley Booth as Judith, John Williams as David, John Tillinger as Sandy, Marian Mercer as Myra, and Carole Shelley as Jackie.

At the Stratford Festival in Canada, Maggie Smith starred in 1977 as Judith in a production directed by Robin Phillips. A 1985 production at the Music Box Theatre in New York had a cast including Mia Dillon as Sorel, Robert Joy as Simon, Barbara Bryne as Clara, Rosemary Harris as Judith, Roy Dotrice as David, Campbell Scott as Sandy, Carolyn Seymour as Myra, Charles Kimbrough as Richard, and Deborah Rush as Jackie. 2014 revivals included one at the Stratford Festival, with Lucy Peacock as Judith, Cynthia Dale as Myra, and Tyrone Savage as Sandy.

=== Other ===
The play was translated into French with the title "Week End", and given at the Théâtre de la Potinière, Paris in 1928. It was well received by audiences and critics; one of the latter wrote that there was "a suggestion of Molière" about it. The French version was revived in 1963 at the Comédie de Paris.

The first professional production of the play in Australia was given by the Allan Wilkie and Hunter-Watts company at the Tivoli Theatre, Melbourne in February 1931, with Wilkie and Hunter-Watts as David and Judith. The Melbourne Argus commented, "The situations are handled deliciously, and the dialogue, highly polished and clever, is at times brutally cynical ... we leave the theatre wondering between our chuckles whether we have any genuine emotions left". A 1989 revival in Sydney starred Carol Raye as Judith. For a 1991 production in Melbourne Patricia Conolly starred as Judith.

== Critical reception ==
Hilda Moore as Myra, 1925

The initial notices in the British press were moderately favourable. Coward told a theatre colleague, Basil Dean, "I'm very surprised it hasn't irritated the Press more – some of them actually seem to have been amused by it." Herbert Farjeon in The Sphere said "Hay Fever begins admirably, tails off, picks up, is disappointing because it is not better, and yet is pleasing because it is so bright". The critic in The Tatler thought that on the whole Hay Fever was "most amusing ... there is no real plot ... but it is very funny". The Illustrated Sporting and Dramatic News found the play "the best of fun ... Let us hope Mr Coward will supply more goods of this quality". The Times said the play was "all, as usual, Mr Coward's fun. All the better fun, be it added, for being punctuated, as usual, with Mr Coward's wit", but thought it was essentially a vehicle for Marie Tempest's "brilliantly comic acting". The Daily Telegraph thought the first act promised more than the two later acts could deliver, and that although Coward's touch had not deserted him, "this particular jest does not quite come off", but it was a "very amusing comedy ... so light and airy". Reviewers in The Daily News and The Tatler both commented that Coward's choice of title seemed inexplicable. (Note: An American critic, Burns Mantle, wrote, "why it is called Hay Fever I have not the slightest notion, unless it is because it may give you a headache". He predicted that the play would have little appeal to audiences "beyond the Vanity Fair crowd that has taken up the fascinating Mr Coward with such enthusiasm".) In 2010 The Times's theatre critic, though offering no firm explanation, commented, "In some productions one's eyes can stream, though only with laughter".

After the first Broadway production The New York Times observed, "If Mr Coward had packed his play with half the humor the actors bring to their parts, Hay Fever might be steadily amusing; at present it has many colorless moments". In Vogue David Carb described the play as "tremendously funny in places" and with the potential to be "a capital 'one-acter'", but with "much too much of the same thing".

Six years later, after the first New York revival, The New York Times said that the play was "theatrical satire, and infernally delicate and accomplished. It is dry, subtle, mettlesome comedy, and it is enormously entertaining". After the 1985 revival opened, the paper said:

In the unlikely event that you stop laughing and start thinking at the sparkling new Broadway revival of Hay Fever you may notice that Noël Coward's comedy has skin-deep characters, little plot, no emotional weight or redeeming social value and very few lines that sound funny ouf of context. All of which goes to show that some plays defy the laws of theatrical gravity. In this now 60-year-old jape Coward demonstrates that pure fluff rises.

Coward was aware that the play lacked obvious witticisms. He commented:

To me the essence of good comedy writing is that perfectly ordinary phrases such as "Just fancy!" should, by virtue of their context, achieve greater laughs than the most literate epigrams. Some of the biggest laughs in Hay Fever occur on such lines as "Go on", "No there isn't, is there?" and "This haddock's disgusting". There are many other glittering examples of my sophistication in the same vein, but I shall refrain from quoting them ...

In a study of Coward's plays, published in 1982, John Lahr called Hay Fever "the first and the finest of his major plays". In 2014 Michael Billington wrote of a new production: "I found myself wondering why, 90 years after it was written, Noël Coward's comedy still proves so astonishingly durable. I suspect it is because it combines astute observation with ironclad technique".

== Adaptations ==
The play was broadcast on radio in 1937 in both the US (CBS Radio) and Britain (BBC radio, with Marie Tempest in her original stage role.) In later BBC radio adaptations, Judith has been played by Athene Seyler (1952), Peggy Ashcroft (1971), and Judi Dench (1993).

Hay Fever was the first of Coward's plays to be televised: an NBC production in 1939 starred Isobel Elsom as Judith. A UK television production in 1960 in ITV's Play of the Week series featured Edith Evans as Judith Bliss and Maggie Smith as Jackie Coryton. This version is not known to have survived. The Times reviewed this broadcast, calling Hay Fever "Mr Noel Coward's best play ... one of the most perfectly engineered comedies of the century." Other members of the television cast were Pamela Brown, George Devine, Paul Eddington and Richard Wattis. Evans and Smith later played in the stage production of Hay Fever under the author's direction in the National Theatre Company's revival in 1964 with Smith switching from the ingénue role of Jackie to that of the vampish Myra. Another lost production of the play in the BBC's Play of the Month series was transmitted in 1968. This featured Lucy Fleming as Sorel, Ian McKellen as Simon, Celia Johnson as Judith, Dennis Price as David, Richard Briers as Sandy, Anna Massey as Myra, Charles Gray as Richard, and Vickery Turner as Jackie.

The BBC recorded another television production, which was first shown in the UK during Christmas 1984. This version stars Penelope Keith as Judith, Eddington as David, Patricia Hodge as Myra, Michael Siberry as Simon, Phoebe Nicholls as Sorel and Benjamin Whitrow as Richard.

== Publication ==
Hay Fever was first published in 1925 in the "Contemporary British Dramatists" series issued by the publisher Ernest Benn, and reissued in 1965 by Heinemann with a three-page introduction by Coward, marking the National Theatre's revival of the piece. Unlike some of Coward's other plays it originally had no dedicatee, but the first American edition (also 1925) is dedicated to Coward's long-time secretary, Lorn Lorraine, as is the 1965 edition.

== Awards and nominations ==
=== 1970 Broadway revival ===
Year	Award	Category	Nominee	Result
1971	Tony Award	Best Costume Design	Jane Greenwood	Nominated

=== 1985 Broadway revival ===
Year	Award	Category	Nominee	Result
1986	Tony Award	Best Revival		Nominated
1986	Tony Award	Best Actress in a Play	Rosemary Harris	Nominated

=== 1992 West End revival ===
Year	Award	Category	Nominee	Result
1993	Laurence Olivier Awards	Best Comedy Performance	Sara Crowe	Nominated
1993	Laurence Olivier Awards	Best Costume Design	Anthony Powell	Nominated

== Notes, references and sources ==
=== Sources ===
- Anderson, Donald (Spring 2011). "A Hasty Kind of Genius: Noël Coward's Hay Fever". Modern Drama. 54 (1): 45–61. doi:10.1353/mdr.2011.0002. (subscription required)
- Billington, Michael (2023). "Introduction". Hay Fever. London: Methuen. ISBN 978-1-35-035411-1.
- Coward, Noël (1925). Hay Fever. New York: Harper and Brothers. OCLC 1553574910.
- Coward, Noël (1965) [1925]. Hay Fever. London: Heinemann. ISBN 978-0-435-20196-8.
- Coward, Noël (2004) [1937]. Present Indicative. London: Methuen. ISBN 978-0-413-77413-2.
- Day, Barry, ed. (2007). The Letters of Noël Coward. London: Methuen. ISBN 978-1-4081-0675-4.
- Findlay, Jean (2015). Chasing Lost Time: The Life of C. K. Scott Moncrieff. London: Vintage. ISBN 978-0-09-950708-6.
- Gaye, Freda, ed. (1967). Who's Who in the Theatre (fourteenth ed.). London: Sir Isaac Pitman and Sons. OCLC 5997224.
- Hoare, Philip (1995). Noël Coward, A Biography. London: Sinclair-Stevenson. ISBN 978-1-85619-265-1.
- Lahr, John (1982). Coward the Playwright. London: Methuen. ISBN 978-0-413-48050-7.
- Magill, Frank, ed. (June 1997). Magill's Literary Annual, 1997. Vol. 2. Pasadena: Salem Press. ISBN 978-0-89356-297-7.
- Mander, Raymond; Joe Mitchenson (2000) [1957]. Theatrical Companion to Coward. Barry Day and Sheridan Morley (2000 edition, ed.) (second ed.). London: Oberon Books. ISBN 978-1-84002-054-0.
- Morley, Sheridan (1974) [1969]. A Talent to Amuse. London: Penguin. ISBN 978-0-14-003863-7. *Reid, Charles (1968). Malcolm Sargent: A Biography. London: Hamish Hamilton. ISBN 978-0-24-191316-1.
