= Justice (play) =

1910 play by John Galsworthy

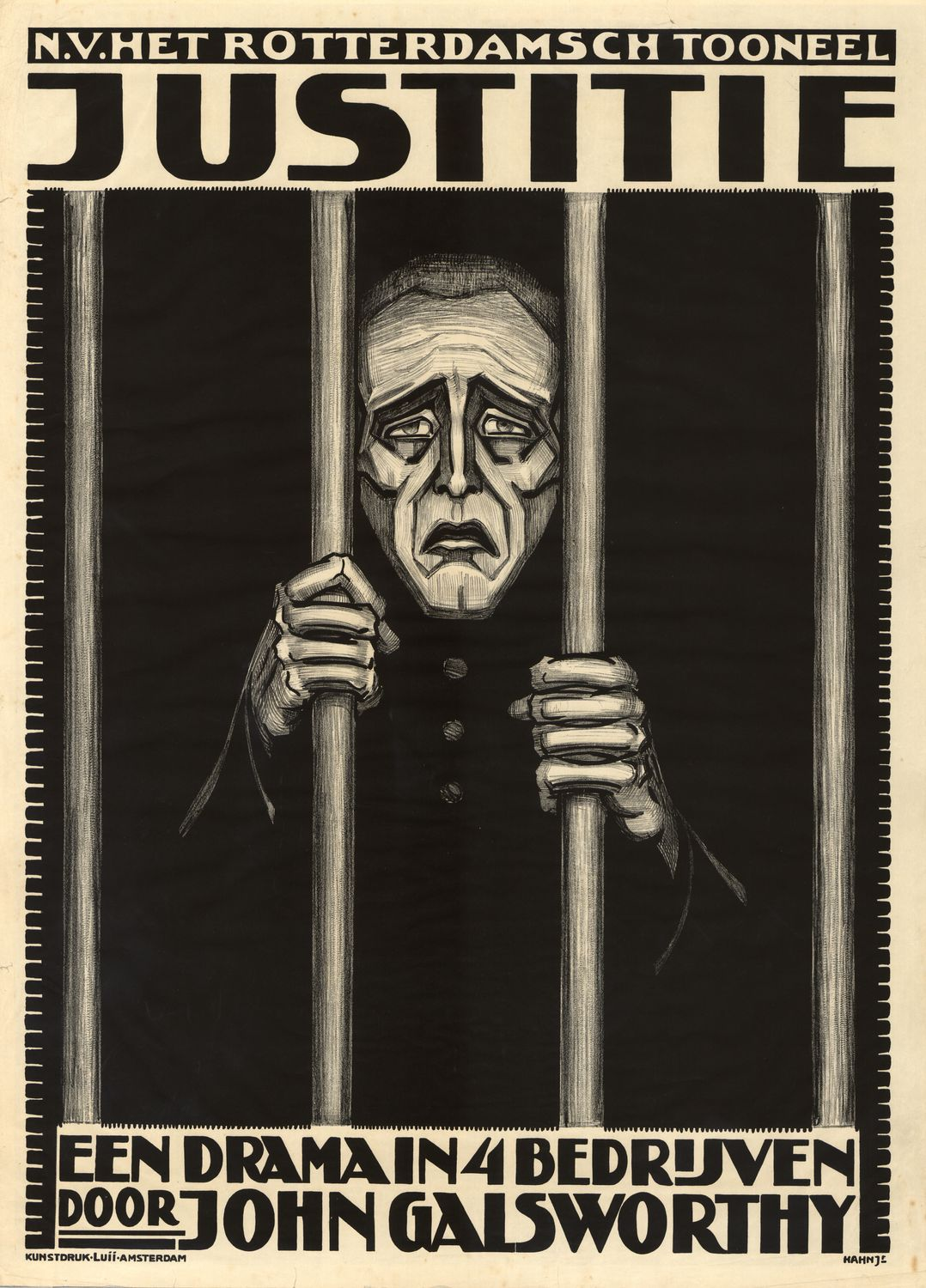
Poster of the Dutch adaptation, designed by Abert Hahn Jr.

Justice is a 1910 play by the British writer John Galsworthy. It was part of a campaign to improve conditions in British prisons.

Winston Churchill attended an early performance of the play at the Duke of York's Theatre in London.

== Plot ==
The play opens in the offices of James How & Sons, solicitors. A young woman appears at the door, with children in tow, asking to see the junior clerk, William Falder, on a personal matter. She is Ruth Honeywill, Falder’s married sweetheart with whom he is planning to elope to save her from brutality and possible death at the hands of her drunken husband. After Robert Cokeson, the senior clerk, discovers that a cheque he had issued for nine pounds has been altered to read ninety, Falder confesses to the forgery, pleading a moment of madness. Realising that he must be in some sort of predicament in connection with the young woman, Cokeson shows considerable sympathy, as does the firm’s junior partner, Walter How. But the senior partner James How does not, and turns Falder over to the police.

The opening of the second act takes place in court, at Falder’s trial. He is defended by a young advocate, Hector Frome, who — while not attempting to deny that his client did indeed alter the cheque — pleads temporary aberration and argues that Falder was attempting to deal with a situation in which the woman he loved could obtain no protection from the law: either she had to stay with her husband, in terror of her life, or she could seek a separation (mere brutality not being a legal ground for divorce) in which case she would end up in the workhouse or on the streets selling her body in order to support her children. He pleads with the jury not to ruin the young man’s life by condemning him to prison. Falder is convicted and is sentenced to three years’ penal servitude.

Cokeson visits Falder’s prison asking if Ruth might be allowed to see the prisoner, but receives no sympathy. Ruth tells Cokeson that she has left her husband and that she is destitute and unable to support herself or her children.

Falder adapts to incarceration poorly, and at the end of his sentence leaves prison a broken man. Ruth and he appear at the solicitors’ offices, and Ruth pleads with the partners to give Falder a chance and to take him back. The partners express their willingness reluctantly, but on condition that he give up Ruth entirely. At this point Falder, horrified, realises that she has managed to survive in his absence only by selling herself.

A policeman arrives to arrest Falder for failing to report to the authorities as a ticket-of-leave man. Overcome by the inexorability of his fate, Falder throws himself out of an upstairs window, falling to his death. The play ends with the words of the senior clerk who has tried so hard to help him, "No one'll touch him now! Never again! He's safe with gentle Jesus!"

== Principal characters ==
- James How, solicitor
- Walter How, solicitor
- Robert Cokeson, their managing clerk
- William Falder, their junior clerk
- Sweedle, their office-boy
- Wister, a detective
- Cowley, a cashier
- Mr Justice Floyd, a judge
- Harold Cleaver, an old advocate
- Hector Frome, a young advocate
- Captain Danson, VC, a prison governor
- The Rev Hugh Miller, a prison chaplain
- Edward Clement, a prison doctor
- Wooder, a chief warder
- Moaney, convict
- Clifton, convict
- O'Cleary, convict
- Ruth Honeywill, a woman

== Adaptation ==
- P.G. Wodehouse wrote a comic piece entitled “The Dramatic Fixer” about Justice for The Passing Show magazine’s August 26, 1916 issue.
- In 1917 the play was adapted into a silent film Justice directed by Maurice Elvey. It was adapted into Hindi as Nyaya by Premchand.
- The 31 October 1948 broadcast of the NBC University Theater, which adapted literary works for radio as part of a collegiate home-study course in partnership with the University of Louisville, presented a radio adaptation of the play which starred Nigel Bruce.

== Bibliography ==
- Havighurst, Alfred F. Radical journalist: H. W. Massingham (1860-1924). Alden and Mowbray, 1974
