= After Dark (1915 film) =

1915 silent British film by Warwick Buckland

- Directed by: Warwick Buckland
- Written by: Dion Boucicault (play)
- Starring: Flora Morris; Harry Royston; Harry Gilbey
- Production company: Buckland Films
- Distributed by: A1 Films
- Release date: December 1915
- Country: United Kingdom
- Languages: Silent; English intertitles

After Dark is a 1915 British silent crime film directed by Warwick Buckland and starring Flora Morris, Harry Royston and Harry Gilbey. It is an adaptation of the 1868 play of the same name by Dion Boucicault.

== Plot ==
A baronet's son marries a barmaid in order to qualify under the inheritance terms of a will.

== Cast ==
- Flora Morris as Eliza Medhurst
- Harry Royston as Charles Dalton
- Harry Gilbey as Gordon Chumley
- Beatrice Read as Rose Egerton
- B.C. Robinson as Chandos Bellingham

== Bibliography ==
- Goble, Alan. The Complete Index to Literary Sources in Film. Walter de Gruyter, 1999.
