= Eugene Aram (novel) =

1832 novel

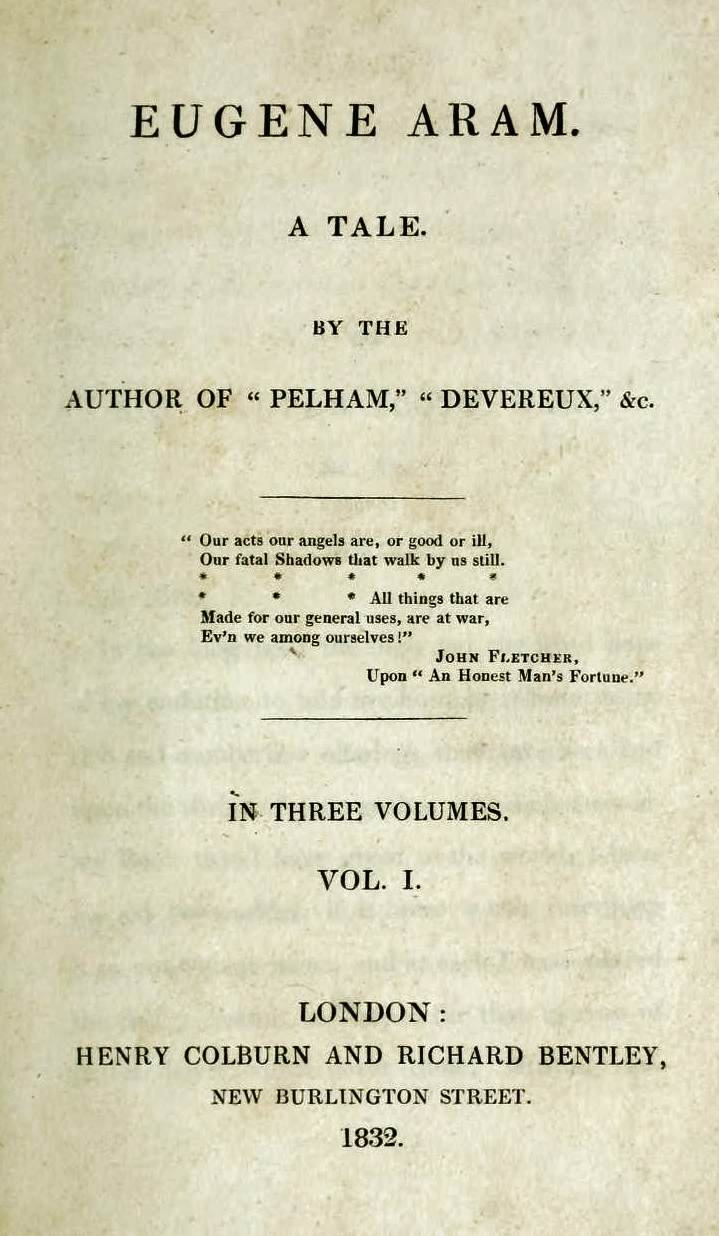
First edition title page

Eugene Aram is a melodramatic novel by the British writer Edward Bulwer-Lytton first published in 1832. It depicts the events leading up to the execution of Eugene Aram in 1759 for murdering his business partner.

== Adaptations ==
Lytton started the novel after having completed the first act of a play on the same subject, then dropping it in favour of what he considered the higher art form. This first act was then extended into a five-act play, giving proper credit to Lytton, by New Orleans poet Espy William Henricks Williams (30 January 1852 – 28 August 1908), and published 1873, shortly after publication by W. G. Wills of The Fate of Eugene Aram, which has been performed (as Eugene Aram) in England and Australia.

The novel was adapted three times for silent films, in 1914, 1915 and 1924.
