= Alec Worcester =

British actor (1887–1952)

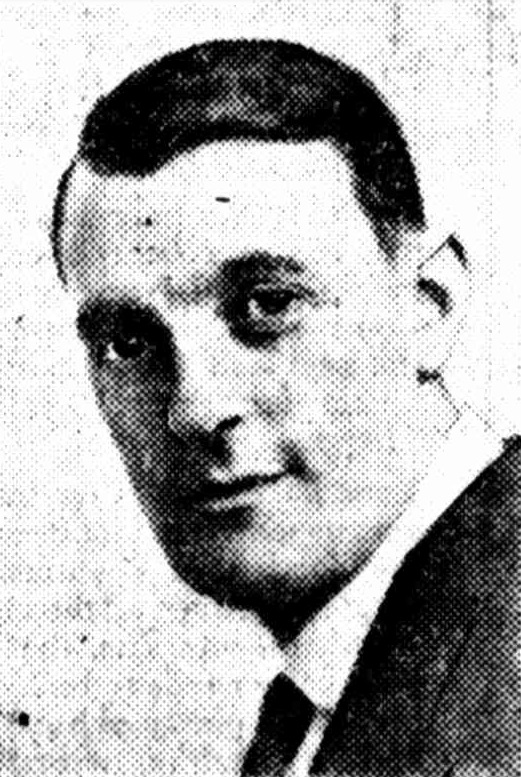
- Born: 1887; Brockley, London; United Kingdom
- Died: 1952 (aged 64–65); Isles of Scilly, Cornwall; United Kingdom
- Occupation: Actor
- Years active: 1912–1914 (film)

Alec Worcester (1887–1952) was a British stage and silent film actor. He played the lead role opposite Alma Taylor in The Cloister and the Hearth and was the lead in fifty shorts. He was married to the actress Violet Hopson until their divorce in 1919.

== Selected filmography ==
- Shadows of a Great City (1913)
- Kissing Cup (1913)
- The Cloister and the Hearth (1913)
- Justice (1914)

== Bibliography ==
- Goble, Alan. The Complete Index to Literary Sources in Film. Walter de Gruyter, 1999.
