= Hilda Moore =

British actress (1886–1929)

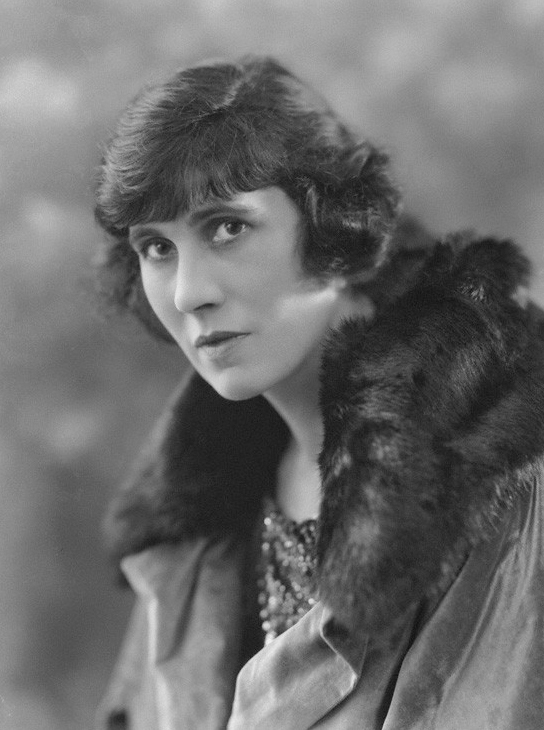
Hilda Moore in 1921

Hilda Mary Moore (born 1886 in London – 18 May 1929 in New York City) was a British stage and film actress. Hilda Moore served in France in WW1 with the FANY British Convoy (First Aid Nursing Yeomanry). The FANY were the first women to drive officially for the British Army. They also worked for the Belgian and French Armies.

Her stage work included the part of Myra in the original production of Noël Coward's Hay Fever at the Ambassadors Theatre in London, in 1925.

== Selected filmography ==
- Whoso Is Without Sin (1916)
- The Broken Melody (1916)
- The Second Mrs. Tanqueray (1916)
- Justice (1917)
- Palais de danse (1928)
- Jealousy (1929; died before film was completed)
