= It's Always the Woman =

- Directed by: Wilfred Noy
- Written by: Bryant Adair (play)
- Produced by: Clarendon Film Company
- Starring: Hayden Coffin; Daisy Burrell; Barbara Hoffe
- Release date: 1916
- Country: United Kingdom
- Language: English

It's Always the Woman is a British silent motion picture of 1916 directed by Wilfred Noy (1883–1948) and produced by the Clarendon Film Company. It stars Hayden Coffin and Daisy Burrell.

The story was adapted from a play by "Riada" (Bryant Adair).

== Outline ==
The British Film Catalogue says: "Vamp breaks major’s marriage, weds him, and sends his daughter to convent where her 'dead' mother is a nun."

== Cast ==
- Hayden Coffin — Major Sterrington
- Daisy Burrell — Mrs Sterrington
- Barbara Hoffe — Esmeralda Chetwynde
