= Justice (1914 film) =

- Directed by: Frank Wilson
- Starring: Alec Worcester; Alma Taylor; Stewart Rome
- Production company: Hepworth Pictures
- Release date: January 1914
- Country: United Kingdom
- Languages: Silent; English intertitles

Justice is a 1914 British silent crime film directed by Frank Wilson and starring Alec Worcester, Alma Taylor and Stewart Rome.

== Cast ==
- Alec Worcester as Jack Raynor
- Alma Taylor as Nan Prescott
- Stewart Rome as Paul Meredith
- Harry Royston as Joe Prescott
- Ruby Belasco as Mrs. Prescott
- Jamie Darling as John Meredith
- Marie de Solla as Mrs. Meredith

== Bibliography ==
- Palmer, Scott. British Film Actors' Credits, 1895-1987. McFarland, 1988.
