= The Marriage Lines (film) =

1921 film

- Directed by: Wilfred Noy
- Written by: J.S. Fletcher; Wilfred Noy
- Produced by: H.B. Parkinson
- Starring: Barbara Hoffe; Lewis Dayton; Sam Livesey
- Production company: Master Films
- Distributed by: Butcher's Film Service
- Release date: November 1921
- Country: United Kingdom
- Languages: Silent; English intertitles

The Marriage Lines is a 1921 British silent drama film directed by Wilfred Noy and starring Barbara Hoffe, Lewis Dayton and Sam Livesey.

== Cast ==
- Barbara Hoffe as Judith
- Lewis Dayton as Michael Muscroft
- Sam Livesey as Martin Muscroft
- Charles Tilson-Chowne as Parkhill
- Enid Sass as Sherratt
- Arthur Walcott as Stephen

== Bibliography ==
- Palmer, Scott. British Film Actors' Credits, 1895-1987. McFarland, 1998.
