= Harold Roberts =

Harold Roberts may refer to:

- Harold W. Roberts (1899–1918), United States Army soldier and recipient of the Medal of Honor
- Harold Roberts (footballer) (1920–2007), English professional footballer
- Harold Roberts (politician) (1884–1950), British Conservative Member of Parliament for Birmingham Handsworth 1945–1950
- Harold C. Roberts (1898–1945), United States Marine Corps officer

== See also ==
- Harry Roberts (disambiguation)
