= Eugene Aram (1914 film) =

1914 film by Edwin J. Collins

- Directed by: Edwin J. Collins
- Based on: Eugene Aram by Edward Bulwer-Lytton
- Release date: 1914
- Country: United Kingdom
- Language: Silent

Eugene Aram is a 1914 British silent drama film directed by Edwin J. Collins and starring Jack Leigh, Mary Manners and John Sargent. It was adapted from the 1832 novel Eugene Aram by Edward Bulwer-Lytton.

== Cast ==
- Jack Leigh - Eugene Aram
- Mary Manners - Madeleine Lester
- John Sargent - Richard Houseman
- Stewart Patterson - Walter Lester
- Wingold Lawrence - Geoffrey Lester
- Antonia Reith - Elinor Lester
- Frank Melrose - Rowland Lester
- Lionel d'Aragon - The Judge
- Henry Foster - Cpl. Bunting
- Harold Saxon-Snell - Mr. Courtland
- Fred Southern - Peter Dealtry
