= Mysteries of London =

- Directed by: A. E. Coleby
- Written by: A. E. Coleby
- Starring: Wingold Lawrence; Flora Morris
- Production company: Martin's Exclusives
- Distributed by: Martin's Exclusives
- Release date: March 1915
- Country: United Kingdom
- Languages: Silent; English intertitles

Mysteries of London is a 1915 British silent crime film directed by A. E. Coleby and starring Wingold Lawrence and Flora Morris. The film may have taken its inspiration from the Victorian penny dreadful The Mysteries of London.

== Synopsis ==
A clerk is framed for a crime, but is freed in time to save his daughter from being murder for her inheritance.

== Cast ==
- Wingold Lawrence as Bob Willis
- Flora Morris as Louise Willis

== Bibliography ==
- Palmer, Scott. British Film Actors' Credits, 1895-1987. McFarland, 1988.
