= Whoso Is Without Sin =

1916 film

- Directed by: Fred Paul
- Written by: Fred Paul; Benedict James; May Sherman
- Starring: Hilda Moore; Milton Rosmer; Flora Morris; Ronald Squire
- Production company: Ideal Film Company
- Distributed by: Ideal Film Company
- Release date: January 1916
- Country: United Kingdom
- Language: English

Whoso Is Without Sin is a 1916 British silent drama film directed by Fred Paul and starring Hilda Moore, Milton Rosmer and Flora Morris. The screenplay concerns a woman who offers shelter to a prostitute.

== Premise ==
An extravagant woman has a change of heart after her husband commits suicide. She offers shelter to a prostitute and protects her from an angry mob.

== Cast ==
- Hilda Moore - Mary Linton
- Milton Rosmer - The Vicar
- Flora Morris - Alice Repton
- Ronald Squire - Roger Markham
- Arthur M. Cullin - John Linton
- Laurence Leyton - James
