= Justice (1917 film) =

1917 film

- Directed by: Maurice Elvey
- Written by: Eliot Stannard
- Based on: Justice by John Galsworthy
- Starring: Gerald du Maurier; Hilda Moore; Lilian Braithwaite; James Carew
- Production company: Ideal Film Company
- Distributed by: Ideal Film Company
- Release date: July 1917
- Running time: 6 reels
- Country: United Kingdom
- Language: Silent (English intertitles)

Justice is a 1917 British silent crime film directed by Maurice Elvey and starring Gerald du Maurier, Hilda Moore, and Lilian Braithwaite. It was based on the 1910 play Justice by John Galsworthy. It is not known whether the film currently survives, which suggests that it is a lost film.

== Cast ==
- Gerald du Maurier as Falder
- Hilda Moore as Ruth Honeywell
- Lilian Braithwaite as Falder's Sister
- James Carew as Wister
- E. Vivian Reynolds as James How
- Douglas Munro as Cokeson
- Hayford Hobbs as Walter How
- Margaret Bannerman as Miss Cokeson
- Teddy Arundell as Honeywell
- Bert Wynne as Davis
- Hubert Willis as Brother-in-Law
- Frank Dane as Frome
- Edward O'Neill as Governor

== Reception ==
Like many American films of the time, the British film Justice was subject to cuts and restrictions by American city and state film censorship boards. For example, the Chicago Board of Censors cut, in Reel 2, the man stealing from a safe and, in Reel 3, the entire scene of the prisoner attacking guard, taking keys, changing clothes, etc., to where the prisoner leaves the cell.
