= Hay Plumb =

English actor and film director (1883–1960)

Edward Hay-Plumb (1883 in Norwich, Norfolk – 1960 in Uxbridge, Middlesex) was an English actor and film director.

He served as a lieutenant in the West Yorkshire Regiment during World War I.

== Selected filmography ==
=== Director ===
- Hamlet (1913)
- A Son of David (1920)

=== Actor ===
- The Cloister and the Hearth (1913)
- The Heart of Midlothian (1914)
- The Professional Guest (1931)
- The Midshipmaid (1932)
- The House of Trent (1933)
- Channel Crossing (1933)
- Orders Is Orders (1934)
- Widow's Might (1935)
- Things Are Looking Up (1935)
- Car of Dreams (1935)
- Song of the Forge (1937)
- Cheer Boys Cheer (1939)
- Let's Be Famous (1939)
