= Shadows of a Great City =

- Directed by: Frank Wilson
- Written by: Herbert Blaché (play); Aaron Hoffman (play)
- Starring: Alec Worcester; Chrissie White; Harry Royston
- Production company: Hepworth Pictures
- Distributed by: Hepworth Pictures
- Release date: November 1913
- Running time: 3,700 feet
- Country: United Kingdom
- Languages: Silent; English intertitles

Shadows of a Great City is a 1913 British silent crime film directed by Frank Wilson and starring Alec Worcester, Chrissie White and Harry Royston. It is an adaptation of the 1884 play The Shadows of a Great City by Herbert Blaché and Aaron Hoffman. An American film adaptation was made two years later.

== Cast ==
- Alec Worcester as Tom Cooper
- Chrissie White as Nellie Standish
- Harry Royston as Jim Malone
- William Felton as Abe Nathan
- Harry Gilbey as George Benton
- John MacAndrews as Insp. Arkwright
- Ruby Belasco as Biddy Malone

== Bibliography ==
- Goble, Alan. The Complete Index to Literary Sources in Film. Walter de Gruyter, 1999.
