= The Second Mrs Tanqueray (1916 film) =

- Directed by: Fred Paul
- Written by: Arthur Wing Pinero (play); Benedict James
- Starring: Hilda Moore; George Alexander; Norman Forbes; James Lindsay
- Production company: Ideal Film Company
- Distributed by: Ideal Film Company
- Release date: March 1916
- Running time: 5 reels
- Country: United Kingdom
- Language: English

The Second Mrs Tanqueray is a 1916 British silent film directed by Fred Paul and starring George Alexander, Hilda Moore and Norman Forbes. It is an adaptation of the 1893 play The Second Mrs Tanqueray by Arthur Wing Pinero.

== Cast ==
- George Alexander - Aubrey Tanqueray
- Hilda Moore - Paula
- Norman Forbes - Caley Drummle
- Marie Hemingway - Ellean Tanqueray
- James Lindsay - Sir George Orreyd
- May Leslie Stuart - Lady Orreyd
- Nelson Ramsey - Misquith
- Mary Rorke - Mrs. Cortellion
- Minna Grey - Mrs. Tanqueray
- Roland Pertwee - Capotain Hugh Ardale
- Bernard Vaughan - Gordon Jayne
