= The Cloister and the Hearth (film) =

1913 British film by Cecil M. Hepworth

- Directed by: Cecil M. Hepworth
- Written by: Charles Reade (novel)
- Starring: Alec Worcester; Alma Taylor; Hay Plumb
- Production company: Hepworth Company
- Distributed by: Hepworth Company
- Release date: November 1913
- Country: United Kingdom
- Languages: Silent; English intertitles

The Cloister and the Hearth is a 1913 British silent historical film directed by Cecil M. Hepworth and starring Alec Worcester, Alma Taylor and Hay Plumb. It is an adaptation of Charles Reade's 1861 novel The Cloister and the Hearth.

== Cast ==
- Alec Worcester as Gerard Eliasson
- Alma Taylor as Margaret
- Hay Plumb as Denys
- Jamie Darling as Elias Eliasson
- Ruby Belasco as Mrs. Eliasson
- Harry Buss as Hans
- Ivy Millais as Mate

== Bibliography ==
- Goble, Alan. The Complete Index to Literary Sources in Film. Walter de Gruyter, 1999.
