= Wingold Lawrence =

British actor (1874–1938)

- Born: 1874; London, England; United Kingdom
- Died: 13 March 1938 (aged 63–64); London, England; United Kingdom
- Occupation: Actor
- Years active: 1912–1923 (film)

Wingold Lawrence (1874–1938) was a British actor. Lawrence emerged as a prominent stage actor of the London theatre. He also enjoyed a brief film career, with leading roles in films such as Eugene Aram (1914) and Mysteries of London (1915).

== Selected filmography ==
- Eugene Aram (1914)
- Mysteries of London (1915)

== Bibliography ==
- Palmer, Scott. British Film Actors' Credits, 1895-1987. McFarland, 1988. ISBN 978-0-89950-316-5.
