= Harry Roberts (cricketer) =

English cricketer

Personal information
- Full name: Harry Edmund Roberts
- Born: 5 June 1924; Earlsdon, Warwickshire, England
- Died: 3 October 1995 (aged 71); Coventry, Warwickshire, England
- Batting: Left-handed
- Bowling: Right-arm medium

Domestic team information
- Years: Team
- 1949–1950: Warwickshire

Career statistics
Competition	First-class
Matches	5
Runs scored	52
Batting average	6.50
100s/50s	–/–
Top score	30
Balls bowled	–
Wickets	–
Bowling average	–
5 wickets in innings	–
10 wickets in match	–
Best bowling	–
Catches/stumpings	3/–
- Source: Cricinfo, 5 October 2015

Harry Edmund Roberts (5 June 1924 – 3 October 1995) was an English cricketer active in the late 1940s and early 1950s, playing in five first-class cricket matches.

Born at Earlsdon in Coventry, Warwickshire, Roberts was educated locally in Coventry. A left-handed opening batsman, he played for several top local league sides, including Coventry and North Warwickshire. He made his debut in first-class cricket when he was selected to play for Warwickshire against Cambridge University at Fenner's in 1949. He made four further appearances in first-class cricket for Warwickshire to 1950, with his final appearance coming against Oxford University at University Parks, Oxford. He scored a total of 52 runs in his five matches, averaging 6.50, with a high score of 30 which he made on debut.

He died of suicide at Coventry on 3 October 1995, jumping in front of a train.
