= Kissing Cup =

- Directed by: Jack Hulcup
- Starring: Harry Gilbey; Chrissie White; Cecil Mannering
- Production company: Hepworth Pictures
- Distributed by: Kinematograph Trading Company
- Release date: August 1913
- Country: United Kingdom
- Languages: Silent; English intertitles

Kissing Cup is a 1913 British silent sports film directed by Jack Hulcup and starring Harry Gilbey, Chrissie White and Cecil Mannering. The film's title is an allusion to the poem Kissing Cup's Race by Campbell Rae Brown. A jockey manages to escape a gang of kidnappers and makes it to Sandown in time to win his race.

The story was filmed again as the silent Kissing Cup's Race (1920) and as the talkie Kissing Cup's Race (1930).

== Cast ==
- Harry Gilbey as Squire Heatherington
- Chrissie White as Chrissie Heatherington
- Cecil Mannering as Jack Heatherington
- Alec Worcester as Richard Cardew
- John MacAndrews as Ingham - the Trainer
- Flora Morris as Daisy Ingham
- Bobby Ingham as Arthur - the Boy Jockey

== See also ==
- List of films about horses
- List of films about horse racing

== Bibliography ==
- Palmer, Scott. British Film Actors' Credits, 1895-1987. McFarland, 1988.
