= Barbara Hoffe =

British actress

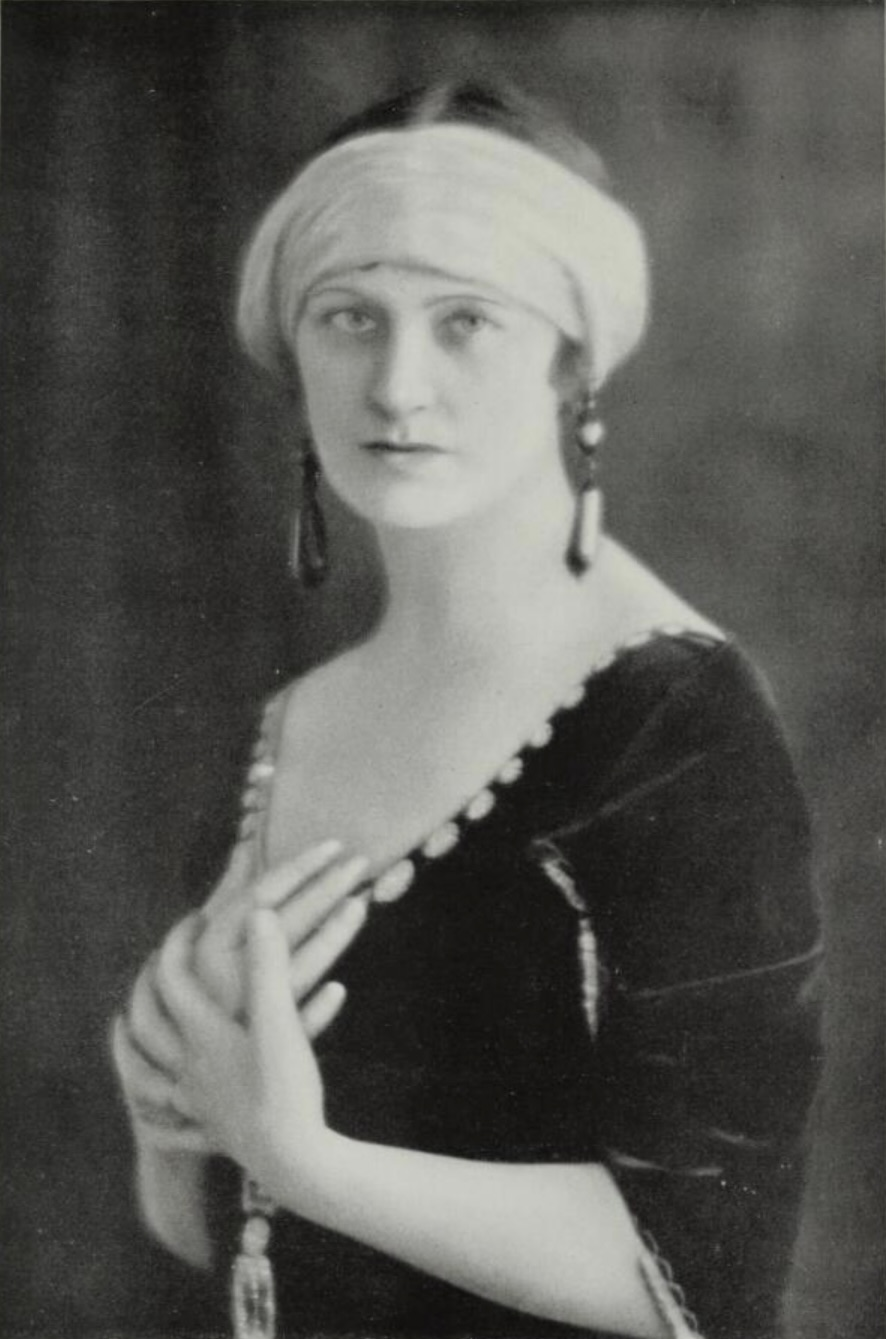
- Hoffe in 1924
- Occupation: Actress
- Years active: 1916–1931 (film)

Barbara Hoffe was a British stage actress. She also appeared in six silent films and one early sound film.

== Filmography ==
- It's Always the Woman (1916)
- Five Pounds Reward (1920)
- The Marriage Lines (1921)
- Belonging (1922)
- Lieutenant Daring RN and the Water Rats (1924)
- Eugene Aram (1924)
- The Woman Between (1931)

== Bibliography ==
- J. P. Wearing. The London Stage 1920-1929: A Calendar of Productions, Performers, and Personnel. Rowman & Littlefield, 2014.
