= Bootles' Baby =

1885 novel by John Strange Winter

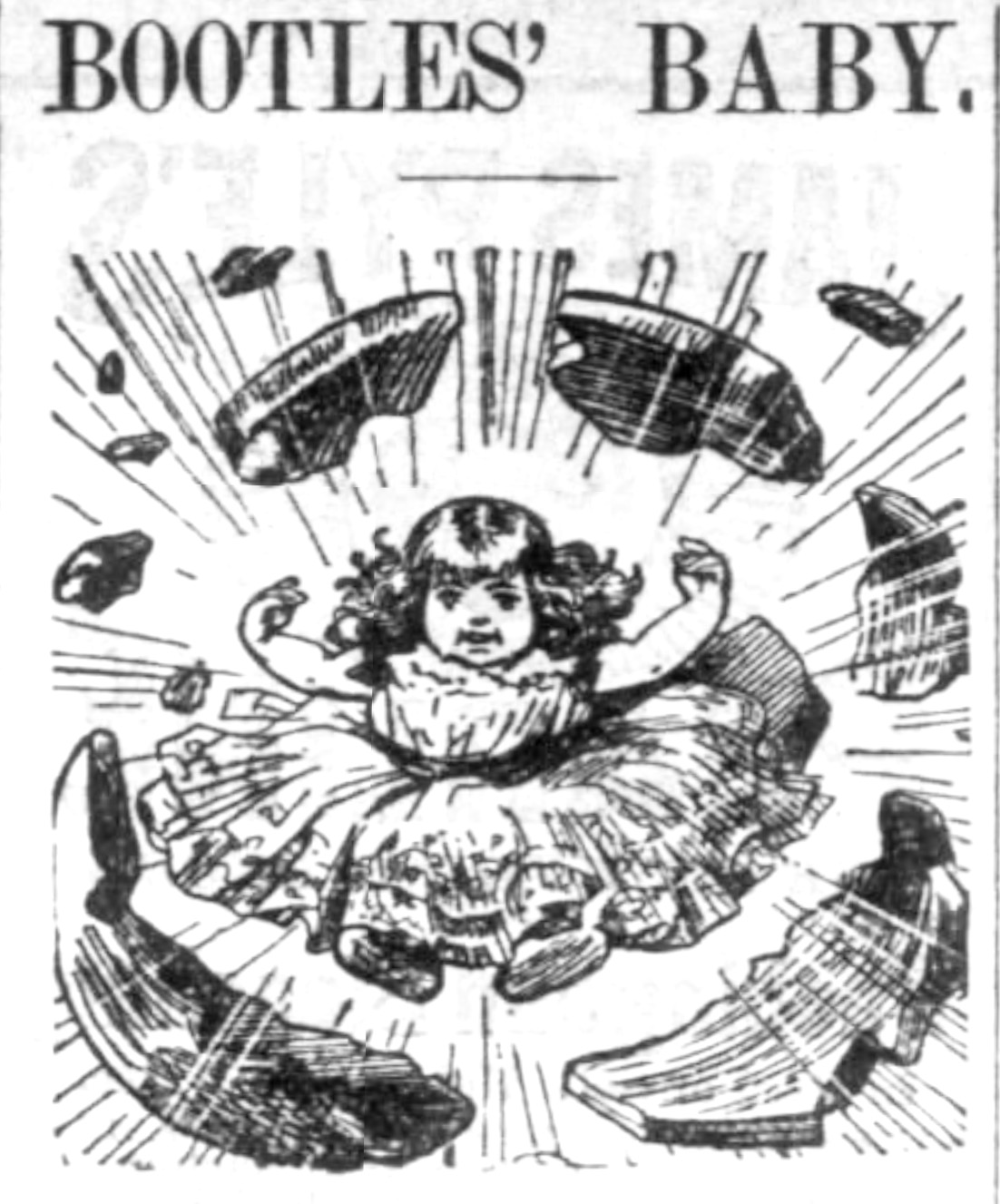
1886 newspaper illustration for chapter one

Bootles' Baby: A Story of the Scarlet Lancers, also published under the title Mignon, is a novel by Henrietta Stannard under the pen name John Strange Winter. It is a lighthearted story about a cavalry officer in The Scarlet Lancers nicknamed "Bootles", who finds a baby in his barracks and adopts her. It was first serialised in The Graphic in 1885, followed by a standalone novel which became the best-selling of Stannard's works.

== Synopsis ==
Algernon Ferrers ("Bootles") is a blundering but kind-hearted captain in The Scarlet Lancers cavalry regiment. In the barracks, he discovers a baby girl in his bed with a letter claiming she is his child from a secret marriage. This flummoxes Bootles and his fellow officers. When the colonel suggests sending her to a workhouse, Bootles resolves to adopt her and hires a nurse. The child, nicknamed "Miss Mignon", becomes the regiment's darling. Only officer Gilchrist dislikes her; the feeling is mutual.

At Christmas, Bootles takes Mignon to his estate, where he hosts a Russian widow, Madame Gourbolska, and her companion, Miss Grace. Bootles falls in love with Miss Grace, who is in turn highly affected by Mignon. After a month, he asks her to be his wife and Mignon's mother. She refuses, calling it "impossible", and leaves him heartbroken.

During the regimental steeplechases, Gilchrist falls off his horse. He confesses that he is Mignon's father, wills everything to her with Bootles as guardian, and dies. The girl's mother Helen Gilchrist requests to see Mignon, and Bootles discovers she is Miss Grace. She was Gilchrist's wife, whom he married secretly and abandoned; now she is free to marry Bootles and reunite with her daughter.

== Publication ==
Stannard wrote Bootles' Baby in September 1883, but it was rejected by several magazines before The Graphic accepted it in August 1884.‍ The story was serialised in The Graphic in the spring of 1885 with the title Mignon,‍ soon followed by a volume sold for one shilling (equivalent to £6 in 2025‍).‍ In the United States, it was serialised in Harper's Bazaar.‍ The book ultimately sold over two million copies, the best-selling of Stannard's novels. Stannard remained known for the novel for the rest of her life, and her son Eliot Stannard was also known as "Bootles".‍

It was followed by two sequels, Mignon's Secret and Mignon's Husband (1887).‍

== Adaptations ==
=== Stage play ===
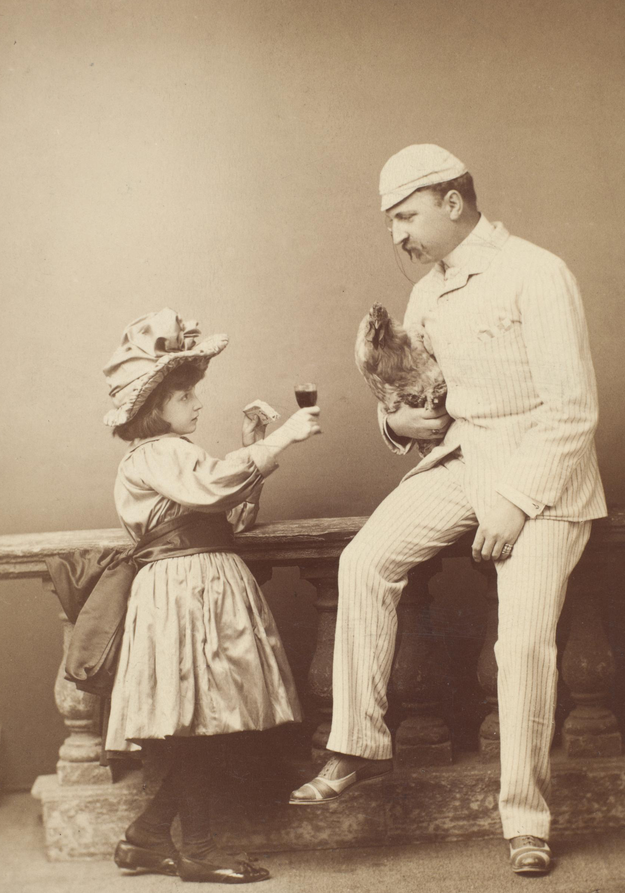
1888 theatrical cabinet card of Mignon (Minnie Terry) and Captain Lucy (C.W. Garthorne)

The novel was adapted into a play around 1888, with a script by Hugh Moss.‍‍ After its debut at the Globe Theatre in London, the production toured England.‍ In 1890, it was also performed in the United States.‍ The theatrical version opens with Gilchrist rejecting his wife and daughter, with Helen placing the baby in what she believes to be her husband's bed. When she meets Bootles and discovers that he has taken in her child, this revives a prior attachment between them.‍‍

An 1889 review of a performance in York praised the staging and acting.‍ A review of a Nottingham performance criticised the adaptation, saying that the dialogue was less charming than in the novel, and the plot was insufficient for a four-act play.‍ In the reviewer's opinion, the primary appeal of the play was its depiction of convivial military life: "the smart uniforms, the barrack gossip, the tittle-tattle of mess, and the savoir faire of military life, largely sustain the interest of the piece."‍ The novel also inspired a march, composed by A. E. Brett, performed as part of the play.‍

=== Short films ===
It also formed the basis of a 1910 American short film and a 1914 British one.‍ The American short film was released by Edison Studios on 21 June 1910, a one-reel short directed by Ashley Miller and starring Robert Conness as Lieutenant Bootle.‍ After the release of the British film, Edison re-issued their film in an "improved" and extended two-reel version, now thirty-five minutes long.‍

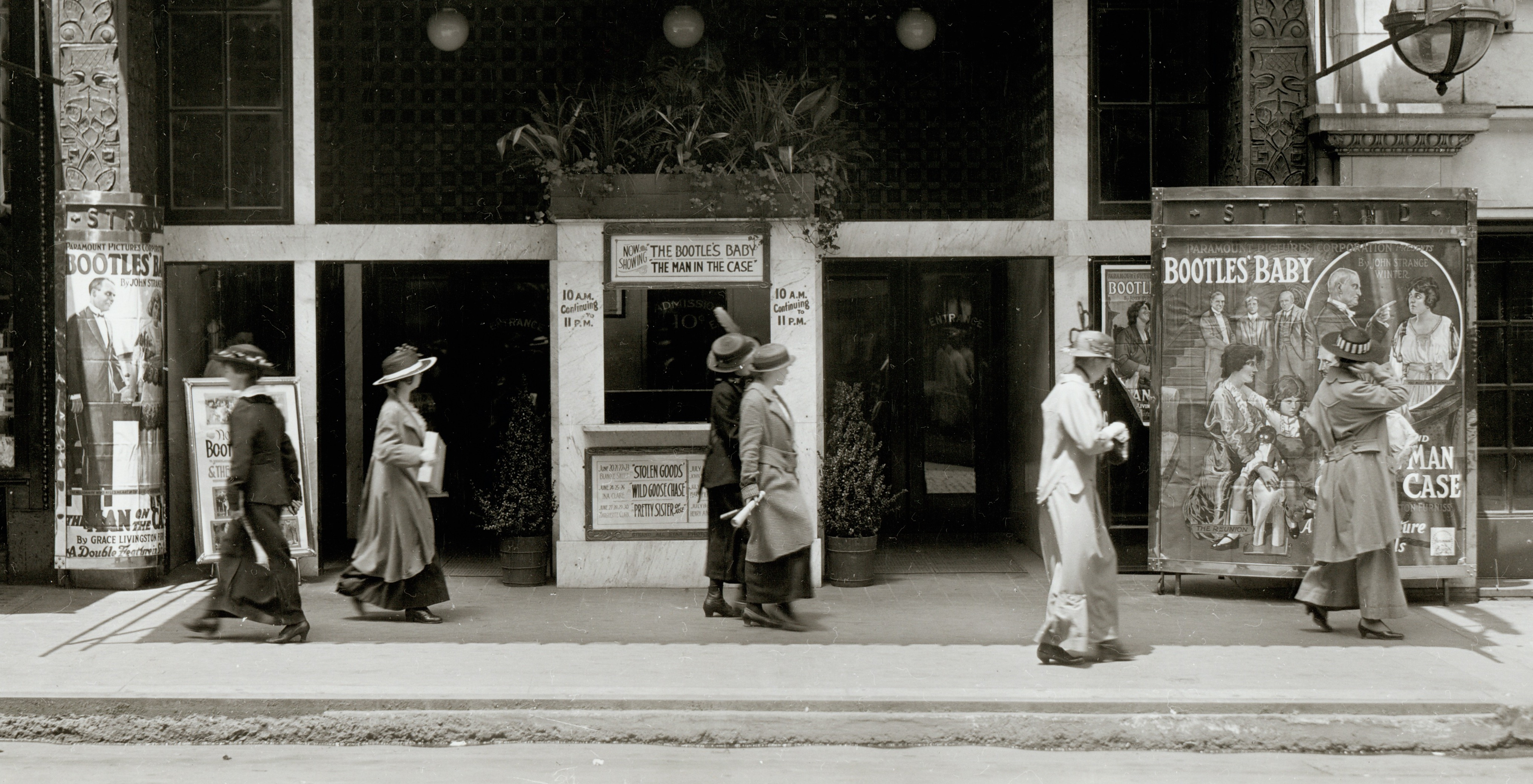
Advertisements for Bootles' Baby outside a St. Louis movie theater in 1915

A review in Moving Picture World of the 1910 version described it as "[a]n entertaining picture admirably adapted from an entertaining story", particularly praising its technical artistry.‍ In 1914, Louis Reeves Harrison in the same magazine declared the film "clean, wholesome and well worth while".‍ Of the skill of the actors, Harrison comments: "Characterization is confined to the leading roles and is strongest in the portrayals of Bootle and Gilchrist, Robert Conness and Herbert Prior carrying off the honors of interpretation. This is not in disparagement of other members of the company. They perform without blemish, especially little Margaret O'Meara, the baby. She does her tiny best and is most amusing when she looks toward the director or casts side-glances at the cameraman. The fact that she is not camera-wise does not detract from her charm of naturalness".‍
