= Harry R. Roberts =

Australian actor (died 1924)

Henry Richard Roberts
- Died: 5 June 1924
- Occupation: Actor
- Spouse: Maggie Moore

Henry Richard Roberts (died 5 June 1924), generally known as Harry Roberts, was an Australian actor remembered as husband of actress Maggie Moore following her divorce from J. C. Williamson.

== History ==
Roberts was the son of actors Richard W. "Dick" Roberts (died c. 1877) and his wife, whose stage name was "Miss Polly Leake" (died 1881). "Dick" Roberts made his first Australian appearance at the Theatre Royal, Melbourne as Asa Trenshard in Our American Cousin on 3 June 1871. He was at one stage lessee and manager of the Haymarket Theatre, Melbourne. Laura Roberts, an actor with a long and successful career, was a sister. Roberts is reported as being born in Dunedin, as Henry Robertson, and his father a cousin of Sir Forbes Robertson.

Roberts gained stage experience from an early age, joking that not only had he played "Little Willie" in East Lynne but also "Little Eva" in Uncle Tom's Cabin. He later appeared in Shakespeare with such companies as George Miln and Essie Jenyns. He played for George Rignold at Her Majesty's Theatre, Sydney, Bland Holt at Drury Lane, Robert Brough at the Criterion, Sydney and J. J. Kennedy at the Gaiety Theatre, Brisbane.

He left Australia for America in 1890 and did not return until 1908. In San Francisco he stage-managed The Silver King for Daniel Frawley's Comedy Company. He played

- Napoleon opposite Mary Van Buren in Madame Sans-Gêne
- Jack Jura, in Henry Hamilton's Moths
- Francis, in Zangwill's Children of the Ghetto
- Jaikes, to Wilton Lackaye's Wilfred Denver in The Silver King
- Petronius to Mary Keane's Eunice and Mary Van Buren's Poppaea in Quo Vadis
- The Dean of Westminster in Cecil Raleigh's The Price of Peace

David Belasco is said to have seen him in Quo Vadis or Peace, and invited him to Boston, where he played

- John Alden, in The Wooing of Priscilla with Eweretta Lawrence as Priscilla Sefton
- The papal nuncio in Belasco's Madame Du Barry

Belasco then engaged Roberts on a five-year contract to support Mrs. Leslie Carter in a wide variety of character parts. He played for two years at the New York Criterion and at the Belasco Theatre. He made for himself a reputation for versatility. He was accordingly chosen by Edward Peple, to create the lead role of

- William Peyton, a young sculptor, in his play The Prince Chap, which part he reprised in June 1906 at the London Criterion, garnering praise for his attitude of affectionate respect towards the child hero of the story. He also starred in
- Sir Horace Welby in Forget-me-Not with Rose Coghlan.
- Charles Courtley in the New York revival of London Assurance with Arthur Lawrence.

When Allan Hamilton, general manager of the Brough Company, secured The Prince Chap for Australia, he also contracted Roberts, and the play opened at the Palace Theatre, Melbourne.

- In 1895 he played Svengali to Moore in the Trilby name part at the Theatre Royal, Melbourne.
- In 1910 he played Du Barry opposite Nellie Stewart at the Theatre Royal, Melbourne for George Musgrove.
- He next starred opposite Maggie Moore at the Palace Theatre in The Shadows of a Great City and The Gambler's Sweetheart.

He made a few appearances after the 1914–18 war, but chiefly for J. C. Williamson's — as the lawyer disguised as a waiter in Pollock's The Sign on the Door at the Criterion with Maud Hannaford and Frank Harvey, and as Pelham Franklin in Cosmo Hamilton's Scandal.

== Last days ==
Roberts suffered from a heart complaint resulting in a long period of intermittent invalidism. When the disease became acute he left his wife at her home "San Francisco" on Wilberforce Avenue, Rose Bay, for professional care at a private hospital in Woollahra, where he died a little before midday on 5 June 1924. Notice of his death was announced by Moore in a telegram to the Greenroom Club, Theatre Royal Buildings, Bourke Street, Melbourne.

== Personal ==
Roberts was tall and lightly built, but had a deep and melodious voice. He was adept at recitation, and was known for projecting emotions in a restrained and unaffected manner.

Moore (born Margaret Virginia Sullivan on 10 April 1851) married Williamson on 2 February 1873; she left him around 1890 and they divorced 29 May 1899. Roberts married her in New York on 12 April 1902.

No reference has been found to Roberts having married previously, or having any children. He and Moore jointly owned a property at Cottesloe, Western Australia.
