= Eugene Aram =

English philologist and murderer

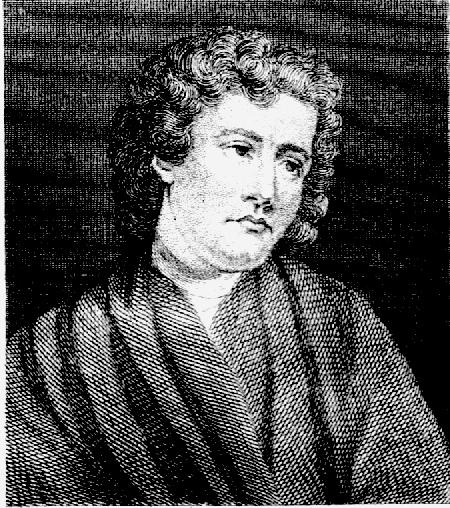
Portrait of Eugene Aram, from The Newgate Calendar

Eugene Aram (c. September 1704 – 6 August 1759) was an English philologist, but also infamous as the murderer celebrated by Thomas Hood in his ballad The Dream of Eugene Aram, and by Edward Bulwer-Lytton in his 1832 novel Eugene Aram.

== Early life ==
Aram was born in September 1704 in Ramsgill, Yorkshire, England, to labourer parents.

He had a "fair school education": reading and arithmetic. At 13 he started working with his father Peter on the Newby estate. Peter's employer, Sir Edward Blackett, allowed him to make use of his library and he taught himself Greek and Latin. In 1720 he went to work as a book-keeper in a counting house in London run by Christopher Blackett, a relative of Sir Edward. He contracted smallpox in London, and became very ill. He decided to return to Yorkshire and found a post as a school teacher in the small village of Netherdale.

While still young, he married "unfortunately" (a term then used for impregnating a woman before marriage) and settled as a schoolmaster at Netherdale; during his years there he taught himself Hebrew.

In 1734 he moved to Knaresborough, and was a schoolmaster by 1745. In that year Daniel Clark, an intimate friend of Aram in Knaresborough, came into ownership of a significant number of goods from tradesmen. The goods included jewelry and silver plates, and were of quite high value. (Note: A contemporary account cites among the valuables, "Three Silver Tankards; Four Silver Pints; One Silver Milk-Pot; One Ring, set with an Emerald and two brilliant Diamonds; another with three Rose Diamonds; a third with an Amethyst in the shape of a Hart...")

Then, Clark suddenly disappeared in 1745. It was first thought he had run off to escape his debts or to sell the goods. Soon after, Aram began clearing all his own debts; suspicion that Aram was involved with Clark's transactions grew. Some of the goods from these tradesmen were found in Aram's garden when it was searched, but due to a lack of sufficient evidence he was discharged and not convicted of any crime. Neighbors commented on his new-found wealth and on the temporary absence from town of Richard Houseman, a flax-dresser, at whose house some of the goods were also found. Aram left Knaresborough, his friends assuming that he had left with a number of valuable, illegally acquired, goods.

== Travels ==
For several years Aram traveled to various parts of England, working as an usher in several schools; in London he found employment as an usher in a school at Piccadilly and learned the Syriac language, Chaldee (Aramaic) and Arabic. During his travels he amassed considerable materials for a work he had projected on etymology, which was a comparative lexicon of the English, Latin, Greek, Hebrew and Celtic languages.

He eventually settled at the Grammar School at King's Lynn, in Norfolk. He became a self-taught pioneer of comparative philology, writing that there was a relation between the Celtic language and other languages in Europe (a proposal that was at the time not agreed by other scholars), and disputing the idea that Latin was derived from Greek (a generally accepted idea at the time). Aram's writings show that he had grasped the right idea on the subject of the Indo-European character of the Celtic languages, which was not established until James Cowles Prichard published his book, Eastern Origin of the Celtic Traditions, in 1831.

In December 1757, Aram settled in King's Lynn.

== Discovery of skeletons and arrest ==
In February 1758, thirteen years after Daniel Clark had disappeared and Aram had left Knaresborough, a skeleton was found in the town, at Thistle Hill while men were digging to find stone for building. Suspicion arose that it might be Clark's body. Aram's wife was interviewed and said she thought it was Clark and heavily implied that her husband may have been involved, having spent much time with Clark. She had also frequently hinted that Aram and Houseman knew how Clark had disappeared. Speculation arose that Houseman and Aram had conspired to kill Clark and take his possessions.

Houseman was quickly found, arrested, and confronted with the discovered bones. He protested his innocence and, taking up one of the bones, said, "This is no more Dan Clark's bone than it is mine." His manner in saying this roused suspicion that he knew more of Clark's disappearance. When questioned, he contested that he had been present at the murder of Clark by him and another man, Terry, of whom nothing further is heard. Houseman's answers however indicated that the reason he knew the skeleton was not Daniel Clark was because he knew where Clark was in fact buried. After multiple denials, Houseman eventually turned King's Evidence, stating that he himself had been present at the murder, but testifying that Aram had murdered Clark, alongside a man named Terry of whom nothing else was heard. Houseman spoke of the place where the body had been buried; St Robert's Cave, a well-known spot near Knaresborough. A collection of bones were in fact found in the cave.

Aram had made no attempt to change his name and was tracked down in the school at King's Lynn and arrested on 21 August 1758, immediately after the discovery of the bones.

== Trial and execution ==
Aram was sent to York for trial, and held at Tyburn Prison. Houseman's testimony was admitted as evidence against him. After spending nearly a year in custody, Aram was tried on 3 August 1759 at York.

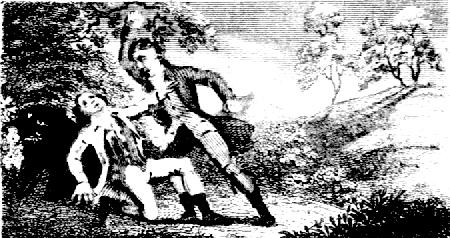
Illustration of Aram's alleged murder of Daniel Clarke, from The Newgate Calendar

Aram conducted his own defence at his August 1759 trial, firstly questioning the identification of the bones. He brought forward several instances where bones had been found in caves, and tried to show that the bones found at St Robert's Cave were probably those of some hermit who had taken up his abode there. He pointed out that another skeleton had been misidentified as Clark's, so the second body might equally be anybody. He stated that Clark had given him several items for safekeeping. However, Houseman claimed to have witnessed Aram kill Clark as they walked to the cave, and that they had split Clark's goods. Houseman had buried the items in his garden. Mrs Aram said she found her husband burning clothes in the garden on the day after Clark's disappearance. Aram additionally asserted his own good character, but did not challenge the evidence given by Houseman which Sarah Tarlow has stated was "shaky, inconsistent and unreliable". There was a lack of conclusive evidence for Aram's part in the murder.

Aram was convicted and sentenced to death, and additionally to be hung in chains close to the scene of the murder, on the wooded banks of the Nidd Gorge at Knaresborough, after death. His execution was scheduled to take place on 6 August 1759, three days after his trial, at York.

While in his cell Aram confessed his guilt, stating that he had discovered an affair between Clark and his own wife. On the night before his execution he made an attempt at suicide by opening the veins in his left arm. (Note: Accounts variously give the weapon as a razor and a steel pen.) This was unsuccessful. Aram's biographer Norrison Scatcherd wrote of Houseman being subject to threats and riots upon his return to Knaresborough.

Aram was hanged at York's Tyburn in an area of the Knavesmire on 6 August 1759.

== After death ==
=== Gibbeting ===
Aram was gibbeted after his death at Knaresborough in 1759, overlooking the River Nidd. His body gradually decomposed, remaining on the gibbet for at least 25 to 30 years. One account, however, claims that Aram's wife collected his bones as they fell from the gibbet; this is unlikely as she had been instrumental in his arrest after he had abandoned her.

Likely prior to the end of the 18th century, one Hutchinson, a doctor practising in Knaresborough, took Aram's skull from the gibbet to add to his cabinet of curiosities, most likely simply due to its association with a significant local event. An 1832 writing by a pseudonymous correspondent of a literary journal describes its retrieval:

"on a dark and stormy night, agitated by conflicting feelings, like a bride-groom on the eve of marriage, the doctor sallied forth, from the town of Knaresborough, with a ladder on his shoulder, and with the firm purpose of mounting the gibbet and detaching from the iron hoop which bound it the skull of Eugene Aram. The gibbet clung to its own property with wonderful tenacity; but the ardor of the doctor became a furor, and he succeeded in extricating another neck, almost at risk of his own"

— 'Civis', The Literary Gazette (14 January 1832), p. 25.

One Scatcherd wrote in the Phrenological Journal of 1839 that he had seen the skull in possession of Hutchinson forty years prior. As a result, this retrieval was likely not motivated by a want for phrenological study, as the pseudoscience did not become popular until the early 19th century.

The gibbet post that had been used to suspend Aram was later removed and installed as a beam for a nearby inn, the Windmill, which was later known as the Brewer's Arms.

=== Use of skull in phrenological study ===
A few decades after its retrieval, Aram's skull became best known for its part in the then-new pseudoscientific study of phrenology. It resided in Hutchinson's personal museum until his death, after which it passed to Hutchinson's widow's second husband who had also been his former assistant, one Mr Richardson who was a surgeon from Harrogate. Dr James Inglis likely found out about the skull from Richardson, and then presented it to the Newcastle meeting of the British Association for the Advancement of Science in 1838. Here, though there was significant skepticism of the pseudoscience of phrenology at this meeting, the presentation and analysis of Aram's skull was instrumental in encouraging the respectability of phrenology. In hindsight, Aram's character itself was in dispute, meaning analysis of his skull could not prove or disprove the validity of the method.

The skull then passed from Richardson to John Walker, his step-grandson, and remained in Walker's private collection at Malton in Yorkshire, and after Walker moved house at Great Yarmouth in Norfolk. An Anglican minister, Walker grew embarrassed of his possession of the skull and in 1869 presented it to the Royal College of Surgeons. The skull appears in Sir William Flower's catalogues of the Royal College collections in 1879 and 1907, and remained in its collections until 1993 when it was given to King's Lynn Borough Council; it was exhibited in the town's Old Gaol House museum and remained on display as of 2017.

== In popular culture ==
Aram became a celebrity criminal. The association between the seemingly gentle nature of the scholarly Aram with the violent murder for material gain, as well as the instability of the evidence for his conviction, led to a widespread belief that the wrong person had been executed. This led to great public interest in the murder. Eventually, many works were produced based on Aram's story, including many literary works, a stage play and at least three films. Almost all depictions of Aram portray him as intelligent and reflective.

=== In literature and theatre ===
Thomas Hood's ballad The Dream of Eugene Aram (1829) is a narrative poem about Aram. It centres on Aram's activity as a schoolteacher, contrasting his scholarship with his hidden murderous urges. The poem was recited by generations of schoolchildren.

The Edward Bulwer-Lytton novel Eugene Aram (1831) romanticised Aram's story, giving him a beautiful lover, portraying him as a man who became involved in the death of Clark as a victim of circumstance, rather than intentional murder. This novel was later adapted for the stage by W. G. Wills, enjoying a successful run with Henry Irving in the title role.

In Frances Hodgson Burnett's memoir The One I Knew the Best of All, Burnett mentions Aram while describing her own guilty feeling after hiding a parkin (cake) in the cupboard as a child. She says, "[I] was an infant Eugene Aram, and the body of [my] victim was mouldering in the very house with [me]."

There is a reference to the case in Mary Elizabeth Braddon's 1879 novel The Cloven Foot, when the character Celia claims that John Treverton's gloomy moods must mean he committed a murder in his early youth:

"'Just like Eugene Aram,' she had said; 'now positively, Laura, he is like Eugene Aram; and I feel convinced that somebody's bones are bleaching in a cave ready to be put together like the pieces of a puzzle, and to appear against him at the predestined moment. Don't marry him, Laura, I'm sure there is some dreadful burden on his conscience.'"

Aram is also referenced in George Orwell's 1935 poem "A Happy Vicar I Might Have Been":

I am the worm who never turned,

The eunuch without a harem;
Between the priest and the commissar

I walk like Eugene Aram.

P. G. Wodehouse references Aram in several of his fictional works and often quotes from the last two lines of Hood's poem: "And Eugene Aram walk'd between, / With gyves upon his wrist."

- In Chapter 21 of his 1905 novel The Head of Kay's, when the hero Fenn loses his school cap in a possibly incriminating situation, he relates, upon its reappearance, that:
  He had been expecting the cap to turn up, like the corpse of Eugene Aram's victim, at some inconvenient moment.
- In Wodehouse's story Jeeves Takes Charge (1916), again quotes The Dream of Eugene Aram; Bertie Wooster, who has stolen his uncle's manuscript memoir and is worried about hiding it, recalls the poem, though the phrase 'I slew him', does not occur in the original:

I remember, as a kid, having to learn by heart a poem about a bird by the name of Eugene Aram, who had the deuce of a job in this respect. All I can recall of the actual poetry is the bit that goes:

Tum-tum, tum-tum, tum-tumty-tum, I slew him, tum-tum tum!

But I recollect that the poor blighter spent much of his valuable time dumping the corpse into ponds and burying it, and what not, only to have it pop out at him again. It was about an hour after I had shoved the parcel into the drawer when I realized that I had let myself in for just the same sort of thing.

- Bill the Conqueror, published in 1924, contains the reference "It was with all the depression of a Eugene Aram that he strode from the pond and buried himself in a quiet, leafy by-way."
- In 1929's Summer Lightning, Ronnie Fish is compared to Aram:

A morning spent in solitary wrestling with a guilty conscience had left Ronnie Fish thoroughly unstrung. By the time the clock over the stable struck the hour of one, his mental condition had begun to resemble that of the late Eugene Aram.

- In Chapter 8 of his 1946 novel Joy in the Morning, Bertie recalls:
  I had begun to feel like Eugene Aram just before they put the gyves on his wrists. I don't know if you remember the passage? "Ti-tum-ti-tum ti-tumty tum, ti-tumty tumty mist (I think it's mist), and Eugene Aram walked between, with gyves upon his wrist."
- In Chapter 6 of the 1954 novel Jeeves and the Feudal Spirit (American title: Bertie Wooster Sees it Through) after being hauled before the Vinton Street Magistrate, Bertie tells his valet:

'A little trouble last night with the minions of the Law, Jeeves,' I said. 'Quite a bit of that Eugene-Aram-walked-between-with-gyves-upon-his-wrists stuff.' 'Indeed, sir? Most vexing.'

Aram is referenced in the eighth chapter of E. Phillips Oppenheim's novel, The Great Impersonation:

'Roger Unthank was a lunatic,' Dominey pronounced deliberately. 'His behaviour from the first was the behaviour of a madman.' 'The Eugene Aram type of village schoolmaster gradually drifting into positive insanity,' Mangan acquiesced.

Aram is mentioned by Dr. Thorndyke in Chapter 11 of the R. Austin Freeman 1911 novel The Eye of Osiris, where Thorndyke expounds on the difficulty of disposing of the human body:

The essential permanence of the human body is well shown in the classical case of Eugene Aram; but a still more striking instance is that of Sekenen-Ra the Third, one of the last kings of the seventeenth Egyptian dynasty.

Aram is referenced in Chapter 6 of the 1947 novel Love Among the Ruins by Angela Thirkell: "at which Mr. Marling went so purple in the face that his wife and son, closing in on him, walked him away like Eugene Aram."

== See also ==
- Edward H. Rulloff, another philologist-murderer
- William Chester Minor, paranoid murderer and self-mutilator, prolific contributor to the Oxford English Dictionary

== Bibliography ==
- Bristow, William (1759). The Genuine Account of the Trial of Eugene Aram, For the Murder of Daniel Clark, Late of Knaresbrough, in the County of York. York: A. Ward for C. Etherington.
- Watson, Eric R. (1913). Eugene Aram: His Life and Trial (PDF). Edinburgh; London: William Hodge.
