= Henry Roberts (fl. 1606) =

English writer and poet

- Occupations: Poet, author
- Writing career
- Years active: fl. 1606
- Literary movement: Elizabethan

Henry Roberts (fl. 1606) was an English writer and poet. His works are all of extreme rarity, may be identical with the "Henrie Roberts, one of the sworne esquires" of Queen Elizabeth and envoy from her highness to "Mully Hamet, emperour of Marocco and king of Fes", in 1585, whose embassy is recounted in Richard Hakluyt's Voyages (1589, pp. 237–9). He was subsequently attached to the court of James I, and was present at the festivities upon the occasion of the visit of Christian IV of Denmark to England in 1606.

== Works ==
- A most friendly farewell, Giuen by a welwiller to the right worshipful Sir Frauncis Drake, Knight, Generall of her Maiesties Nauy, which be appointed for this his honorable voiage, and the rest of the fleete bound to the Southward, and to all the Gentlemen his followers and captaines in this exploite, who set sale from Wolwich the xv. day of Iuly, 1585 …, imprinted at London by Walter Mantell and Thomas Lawe, 8 leaves; the only copy known is at Britwell.
- Robertes his Welcomme of Good Will to Capt. Candishe [?Cavendish]; licensed to John Wolfe 3 December 1588; no copy known (Arber, Stationers' Regist. ii. 238).
- An Epitaphe vpon ye Death of the Erle of Leicester, by Hen. Robertes licensed to John Charlwood 5 December 1589 (Ames, ed. Herbert, ii. 1105; Arber, Regist. ii. 251 b). This is the only work by Roberts to which Joseph Ritson alludes; no copy exists.
- Fames Trumpet Soundinge, or Commemorations of the Famous Liues and Deathes of the two Right Honourable Knights of England: the Right Honourable Sir Walter Mildmay and Sir Martin Calthrop, Lord Mayor … who deceased this year, 1589. … At London printed by I. C. for Thomas Hackett, 1589 (Arber, Regist. ii. 246 b); inscribed to ‘Ma. Anthony Mildmay’; the only copy known is in the Grenville Library, British Museum; reprinted in Huth's Fugitive Tracts, 1st series 1875.
- A Defiance to Fortune. Proclaimed by Andrugio, noble Duke of Saxony, declaring his miseries, and continually crossed with vnconstant Fortune, the banishment of himselfe, his wife and children. Whereunto is adioyned the honorable Warres of Galastino, Duke of Millaine, in reuenge of his wrongs vpon the trayterous Saxons, London, 1590. Copies are in the Malone collection at the Bodleian Library, and at Britwell; a second part was licensed to Abel Jeffes in 1592.
- Our Ladys Retorne to England, accompanied with saint Frances and the good Iesus of Viana in Portugall, who comming from Brasell, ariued at Clauelly in Deuonshire, the third of Iune 1592, a pæan upon the capture of a Spanish ship, London, 1592. The only copy known is in the Britwell Library.
- Newes from the Leuane Seas, describing the many perrilous events of the most worthy deseruing gentleman, Edward Glenham, Esquire … with a Relation of his Troubles and Indirect Dealings of the King Argere in Barbarie, London, 1594 (British Museum).
- The Trumpet of Fame: or Sir Fraunces Drakes and Sir Iohn Hawkins Farewell, London, 1595. The only copy known is in the Britwell Library. It was reprinted at the Lee Priory Press, with a preface by Park, 1818; it celebrates in homely decasyllabic verse the departure of Drake and Hawkins on their unsuccessful Porto Rico expedition.
- Pheander, the Mayden Knight; describing his honourable Trauailes and hautie attempts in Armes, with his successe in loue. Enterlaced with many pleasant discourses …, printed by Thomas Creede, London, 1595; an imperfect copy is at Britwell; a ‘fourth’ edition, with a slightly modified title, 1617, is also at Britwell; and another edition, 1661, is at Bridgewater House.
- Honovrs Conquest, wherin is conteined the Famous Hystorie of Edward of Lancaster, recounting his Honourable Travailes to Jerusalem …; printed by Thos. Creede, 1598; in the Douce collection in the Bodleian.
- Haigh for Deuonshire. A pleasant Discourse of sixe gallant Marchants of Deuonshire, London, 1600, 4to; this is a shameless plagiarism from the ‘Six Worthy Yeomen of the West’ of Thomas Deloney. The only copy known is in the Britwell Library (see an article by W. B. Pye in the Western Antiquary, February 1885).
- The Most Royall and Honourable Entertainement of the Famous and Renowmed King, Christein the Fourth, King of Denmark … who with a Fleete of Gallant Ships arrived on Thursday the 16 day of Iuly 1606 at Tylbery Hope …, London, 1606, 4to (Huth Library; reprinted in Harleian Miscellany, ix. 431, and in John Nichols's Progresses of James I, vol. ii.).
- England's Farewell to Christian the Fourth, Famous King of Denmark, London, 1606, 4to; dedicated to Sir John Jolles, sheriff of London (British Museum and Huth Library; reprinted in Harleian Miscellany, ix. 440, and in Nichols's Progresses of James I, vol. ii.).
- A True Relation of a most worthy and notable Fight, performed … by two small Shippes of the Citie of London: the Vineyard and the Vnicorne … against Sixe great Gallies of Tunes, London [1616]. The only copy known is at Britwell.
