= John Strange Winter =

British novelist (1856–1911)

Henrietta Eliza Vaughan Stannard
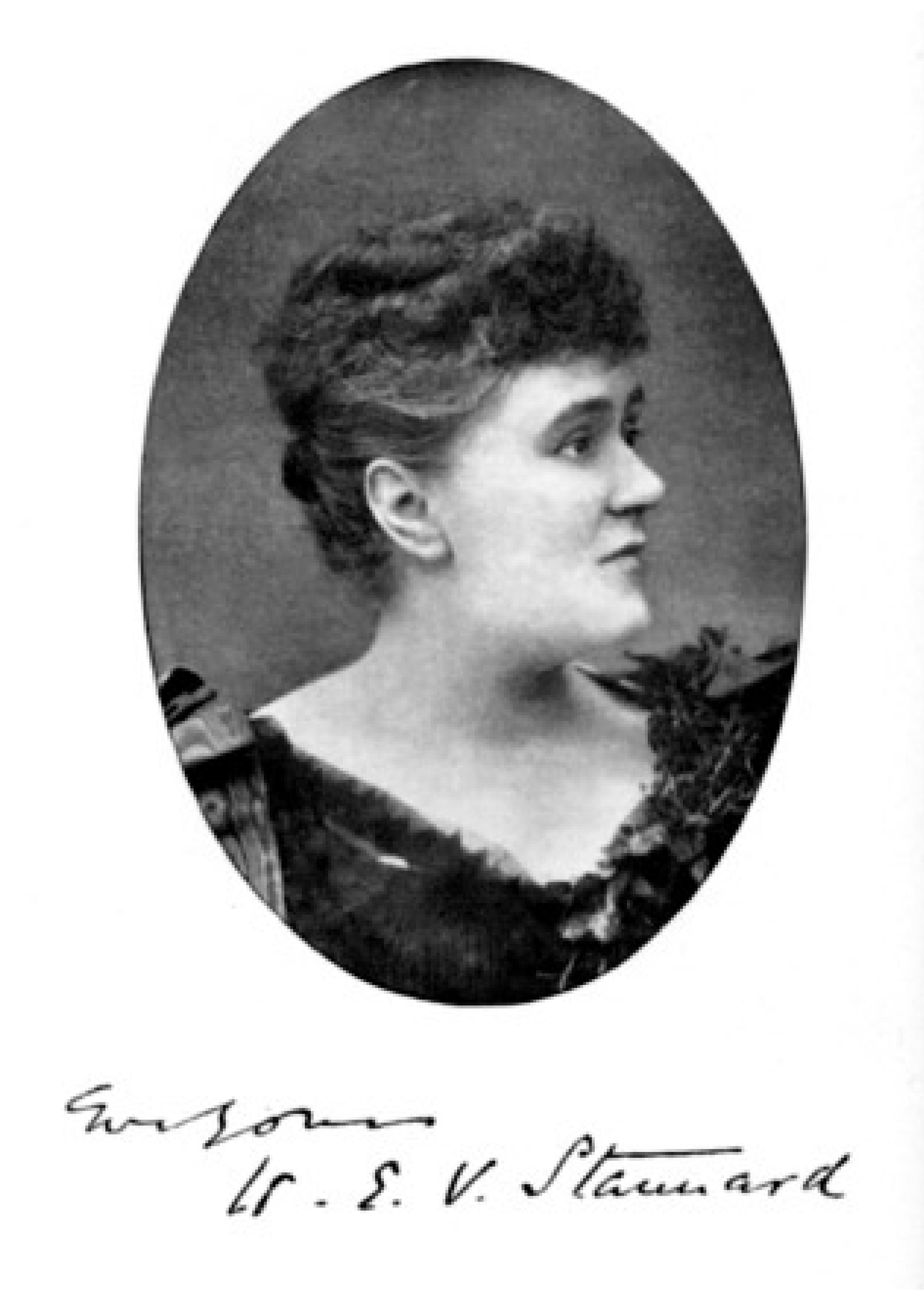
- Stannard in 1893
- Born: Henrietta Eliza Vaughan Palmer; 13 January 1856; York, North Yorkshire, United Kingdom
- Died: 13 December 1911 (aged 55); Hurlingham, Putney, London, United Kingdom
- Resting place: Woking Crematorium
- Other name: Violet Whyte
- Education: Bootham House School
- Occupation: Writer
- Spouse: Arthur Stannard (m. 1884 - 1911)
- Children: 4, including Eliot
- Family: Hannah Pritchard (great-great-great grandmother)

Henrietta Eliza Vaughan Stannard (née Palmer; 13 July 1856 – 13 December 1911), writing under the pseudonym of John Strange Winter, was a British novelist. She was founding president of the Writers' Club in 1892, and president of the Society of Women Journalists in 1901 to 1903.

== Early life and education ==
She was born on 13 January 1856 in Trinity Lane, York, the only daughter of Henry Vaughan Palmer, rector of St. Margaret's, York, and his wife Emily Catherine Cowling. Her father had been an officer in the Royal Artillery before taking religious orders, and was descended from several generations of soldiers. Her great-great-great-grandmother was the actress Hannah Pritchard. Henrietta was educated at Bootham House School, York.

== Career ==
In 1874, she began her career as a novelist by writing under the pseudonym of 'Violet Whyte' for the Family Herald. Her connection with that journal lasted for ten years, and she contributed to it 42 short stories issued as supplements, besides many long serials. In 1881, appeared Cavalry Life, a collection of regimental sketches, and in 1883 Regimental Legends. Both bore the name of 'John Strange Winter,' a character in one of the tales in the former volume. The publisher refused to bring out the books under a feminine pseudonym. The public assumed the author to be a cavalry officer. She retained the name for literary and business purposes through life.

Henrietta Palmer was married at Fulford, York, on 26 February 1884, to Arthur Stannard and they had a son, scriptwriter Eliot Stannard, and three daughters.

The couple settled in London at a house known as 'The Cedars' on the River Thames at Putney, where Henrietta continued her literary endeavours. In 1885, Bootles' Baby: A Story of the Scarlet Lancers, the tale that assured her popularity, appeared in the Graphic. Two million copies were sold within ten years of its first publication. Tales of a similar character, with military life for their setting, followed in rapid succession until her death. There are 112 entries to her name in the British Museum Catalogue. She found an admirer of her work in leading art critic John Ruskin and in 1888 visited at his home in Sandgate. Ruskin wrote of 'John Strange Winter' as "the author to whom we owe the most finished and faithful rendering ever yet given of the character of the British soldier". For some time Ruskin and John Strange Winter constantly corresponded.

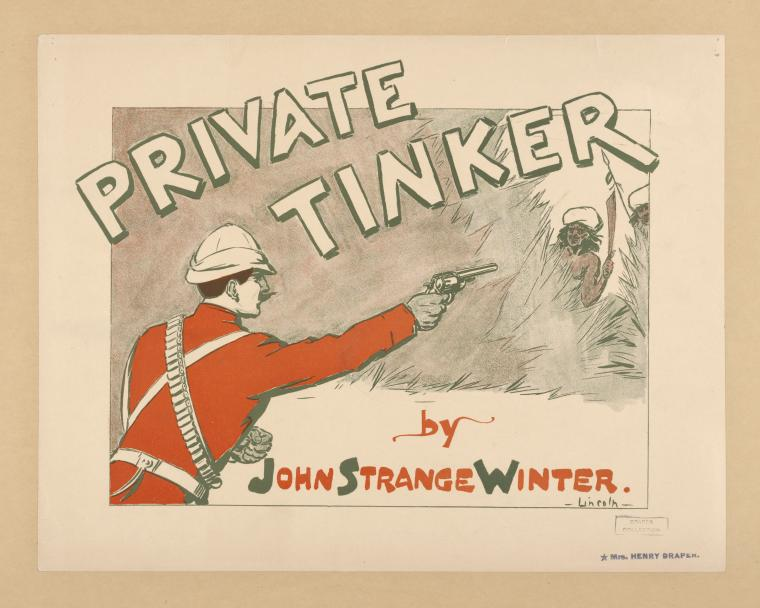
Promotional poster for Private Tinker.

In 1891, she started a penny weekly magazine, Golden Gates; in 1892 the title was altered to Winter's Weekly, and in its first issues it launched the career of Nora Vynne. The magazine continued until 1895, but in 1896, the health of her husband and of her youngest daughter made residence at the seaside imperative, and Dieppe became her home until 1901, when she returned to London, retaining a house at Dieppe for summer residence until 1909. She wrote enthusiastic articles about Dieppe which greatly increased its popularity. The municipality presented her with a diamond ring in recognition of her services to the town.

Well known in journalistic circles, she was first president of the Writers' Club (1892), and was president of the Society of Women Journalists (1901–03).

In 1903, she started a cosmetics business selling goods including face powders and paper marquise, under the name J. S. W. Preparations. She promoted this cosmetics line with the book Comely Woman.

Mrs. Stannard died, from complications following an accident, on 13 December 1911 at York House, Hurlingham, Putney. She was cremated and the ashes interred at Woking Crematorium. Notwithstanding her many activities, she left only £547. She was the subject of a biography, John Strange Winter: a volume of personal record (1916) by Oliver Bainbridge, with a foreword by General Sir Alfred Turner.
