= Warwick Buckland =

British actor

- Born: 1863; United Kingdom
- Died: 1945 (aged 81–82); United Kingdom
- Occupations: Actor, Director
- Years active: 1911 - 1920 (film)

Warwick Buckland (1863–1945) was a British stage actor. He later became a film actor and director. He directed the 1915 crime film After Dark. Buckland also worked as an art director, designing the sets for the epic Barnaby Rudge made by Hepworth Pictures.

== Selected filmography ==
=== Director ===
- After Dark (1915)

=== Actor ===
- The Vicar of Wakefield (1913)
- The Old Curiosity Shop (1913)
- The Heart of Midlothian (1914)
- Trelawny of the Wells (1916)
- The Grip of Iron (1920)

== Bibliography ==
- Goble, Alan. The Complete Index to Literary Sources in Film. Walter de Gruyter, 1999.
