= The Shadows of a Great City (play) =

The Shadows of a Great City is an 1884 American play by Herbert Blaché and Aaron Hoffman.

== Adaptations ==
The film was turned into a 1913 British silent film Shadows of a Great City directed by Frank Wilson. In 1915 an American silent version The Shadows of a Great City was made, directed by Blaché himself.

== Bibliography ==
- Goble, Alan. The Complete Index to Literary Sources in Film. Walter de Gruyter, 1999.
