= Harry Royston =

British actor (1864–1941)

- Born: 7 September 1864; Bradford, Yorkshire, England, United Kingdom
- Died: 7 March 1941 (aged 76); Bradford, Yorkshire, England, United Kingdom
- Occupation: Actor
- Years active: 1911 - 1920 (film)

Harry Royston (1864–1941) was a British stage and film actor. He appeared in more than sixty short and feature films during the silent era including Lady Jennifer.

== Selected filmography ==
- Oliver Twist (1912)
- Adrift on Life's Tide (1913)
- The Vicar of Wakefield (1913)
- Shadows of a Great City (1913)
- Justice (1914)
- Barnaby Rudge (1915)
- Lady Jennifer (1915)
- Diana and Destiny (1916)
- A Dead Certainty (1920)

== Bibliography ==
- Goble, Alan. The Complete Index to Literary Sources in Film. Walter de Gruyter, 1999.
