= Harry Gilbey =

British actor

- Occupation: Actor
- Years active: 1908 – 1921 (film)

Harry Gilbey was a British actor who appeared in more than fifty films during the silent era including After Dark (1915).

== Selected filmography ==
- The Vicar of Wakefield (1913)
- Kissing Cup (1913)
- After Dark (1915)
- Barnaby Rudge (1915)
- The House of Fortescue (1916)
- The Man Behind 'The Times' (1917)
- The Eternal Triangle (1917)
- Broken Threads (1917)
- With All Her Heart (1920)
- The Adventures of Mr. Pickwick (1921)
- Sybil (1921)

== Bibliography ==
- Goble, Alan. The Complete Index to Literary Sources in Film. Walter de Gruyter, 1999.
