= The Clue of the New Pin =

The Clue of the New Pin may refer to:

- The Clue of the New Pin (novel), a 1923 novel by Edgar Wallace
- The Clue of the New Pin (1929 film), a 1929 British film adaptation
- The Clue of the New Pin (1961 film), a 1961 British film adaptation
