= The Street of Adventure =

The Street of Adventure may refer to:

- The Street of Adventure (novel), a 1919 novel by Philip Gibbs
- The Street of Adventure (film), a 1921 film adaptation by Kenelm Foss
- A popular name for London's Fleet Street, once the centre of British journalism
