= Headmaster (disambiguation) =

A headmaster is a head teacher.

Headmaster or The Headmaster may also refer to:

- The Headmaster (play), a 1913 stage farce
- The Headmaster (film), a 1921 British silent film
- The Headmaster (book), a 1966 biography book of Frank Boyden by John McPhee
- Headmaster (TV series), a 1970 American TV series starring Andy Griffith
- Headmaster (Transformers)

== See also ==
- Sōke
