= Renée Mayer =

British actress (1900–1969)

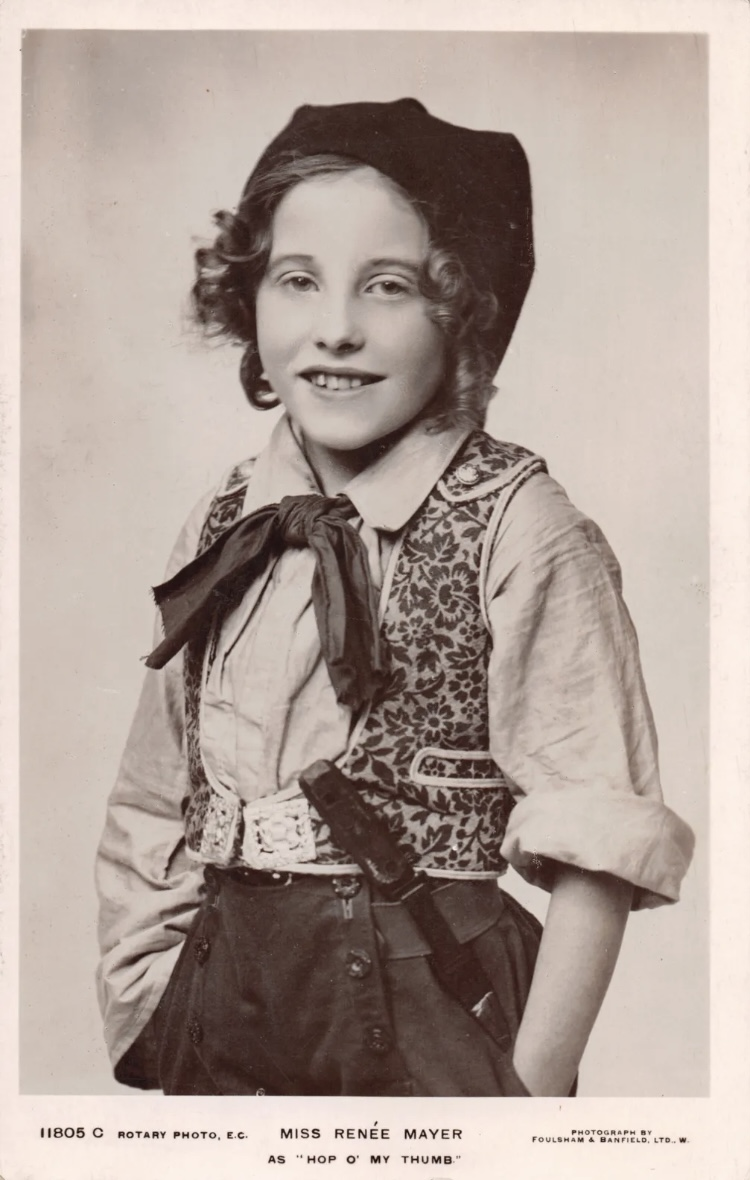
Renée Mayer as Hop in Hop O' My Thumb (1911)

Renée Gladys Mayer (9 December 1900–14 November 1969) was a British child actress, singer and dancer of stage and film.

She was born as Irene Gladys Mayer in Chiswick in London in 1900, the youngest of four children of Mary (1854-) and William Mayer (1854-), a picture dealer. She made her stage début in 1910 as the Pearl Fairy in The Goldfish. She played Hop opposite Barry Lupino as Smilo in Hop O' My Thumb (1911) and Little Peter in Passers By (1911) by C. Haddon Chambers at Wyndham's Theatre opposite Gerald du Maurier. Today she is most remembered for her performances as Puck in three revivals of Sleeping Beauty (1912, 1913 and 1914) at the Theatre Royal, Drury Lane. Mayer appeared in pantomimes throughout her teenage years, including Puss in Puss in Boots (1916),

She appeared in the silent films Masks and Faces (1917) as one of Triplet's children, as Jenny Banks in Victory and Peace (1918) opposite Ellen Terry and Edith Craig, and as Marie Celeste in A Bachelor Husband (1920) opposite Gordon Craig.

She married the actor David Horne (1898-1970) at Kensington in London in 1924. After their divorce she married radio announcer Leslie Allan Rose (1903-1973) in Marylebone in London in 1939. The 1939 Register lists her as a housewife.

Renée Mayer died in Marylebone in London in 1969.
