= Bransby Williams =

British actor and comedian (1870–1961)

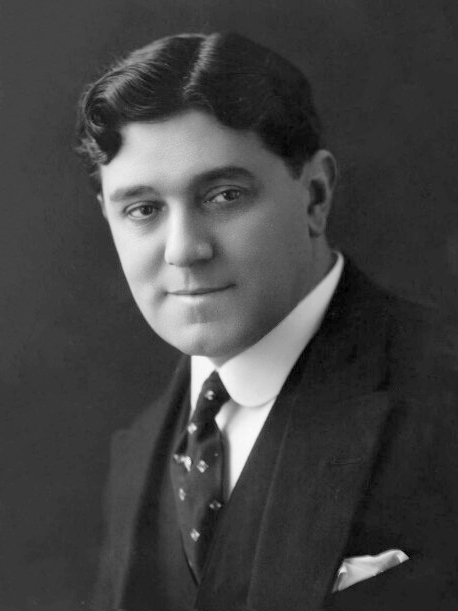
- Williams in 1920
- Born: Bransby William Pharez; 14 August 1870; Hackney, London, England, U.K.
- Died: 3 December 1961 (aged 91); London, England, U.K.
- Other name: The Irving of the music halls
- Occupations: Actor, comedian, monologist
- Years active: 1918–1958
- Spouse: Emilie Margaret Dent (m. 1892)
- Children: 5, including Eric Bransby Williams

Bransby Williams (born Bransby William Pharez; 14 August 1870 – 3 December 1961) was a British actor, comedian and monologist. He became known as "The Irving of the music halls".

== Early years ==
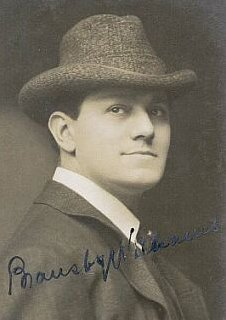
Williams in about 1909

Born in Hackney, London, the son of William Meshech Pharez and Margaret Giles (née Booth), Bransby Williams began his working life as a tea taster in Mincing Lane before working in the design department of a wallpaper manufacturer. He appeared as an amateur actor before turning professional doing impersonations of Dan Leno, Gus Elen, Joe Elvin, Albert Chevalier and other music hall stars in working men's clubs. His first appearance in a music hall was at The London Music Hall in Shoreditch on 26 August 1896, during which he gave impersonations of the leading actors of that time, including Henry Irving in The Bells, Herbert Beerbohm Tree as Svengali from the popular play Trilby, adapted from the 1894 George du Maurier novel of the same name.

In 1897, Williams first created a variety of characters, including many from the works of Dickens such as Mr Micawber, Uriah Heep, Bill Sikes and Fagin. In 1898, he appeared as Sydney Carton in The Noble Deed, based on A Tale of Two Cities at the Oxford Theatre. He performed in monologues, recitations and sketches, including the Lounger and The Green Eye of the Yellow God.

== Actor-manager ==
Williams became a great success, and he appeared before King Edward VII at Sandringham House in a Royal Command Performance on 3 December 1903, when he performed the characters from Dickens as well as his impersonations of famous actors and comedians of the day. In 1905 and 1907, he toured in the United States. On 7 January 1914, in King's Hall, Covent Garden, Williams played Anthony Durdles in the mock trial of John Jasper for the murder of Edwin Drood. At this all-star event G.K. Chesterton was Judge and George Bernard Shaw was foreman of the jury. In 1922, Williams toured the UK with his own company as actor-manager, performing in a series of plays based on Dickens, including David Copperfield, Oliver Twist and Barnaby Rudge. In 1923, he purchased the stock of the late Sir Henry Irving, which he used in his tour of The Lyons Mail and in March of that year he played Hamlet for the first time at the Prince of Wales Theatre in Birmingham. Later he also bought the stock of Laurence and H.B. Irving. In June 1923, he appeared at the Lyceum as both Micawber and Peggotty in David Copperfield, after which he and his company toured Canada.

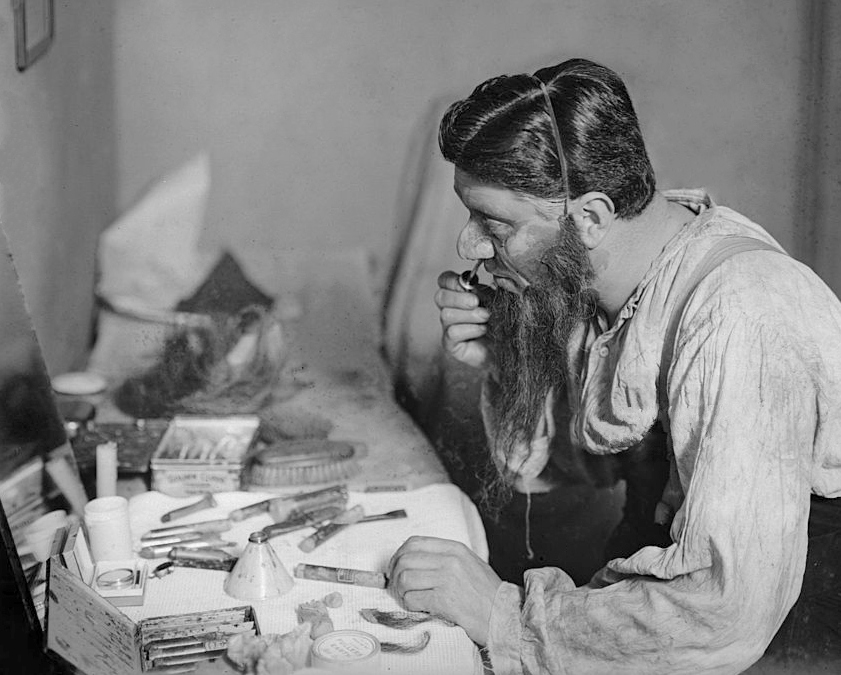
Williams in 1909, preparing for the role of Fagin in Oliver Twist

Williams as Barnaby Rudge

In 1924, Williams was engaged by J.C. Williamson to tour Australia, during which he performed his characters from Dickens and his impersonations of famous actors and comedians of that and former days, including Sir Henry Irving, Sir Herbert Beerbohm Tree, Sir George Alexander, Dan Leno, Cyril Maude and Sir Charles Wyndham. The tour then moved on to New Zealand and South Africa.

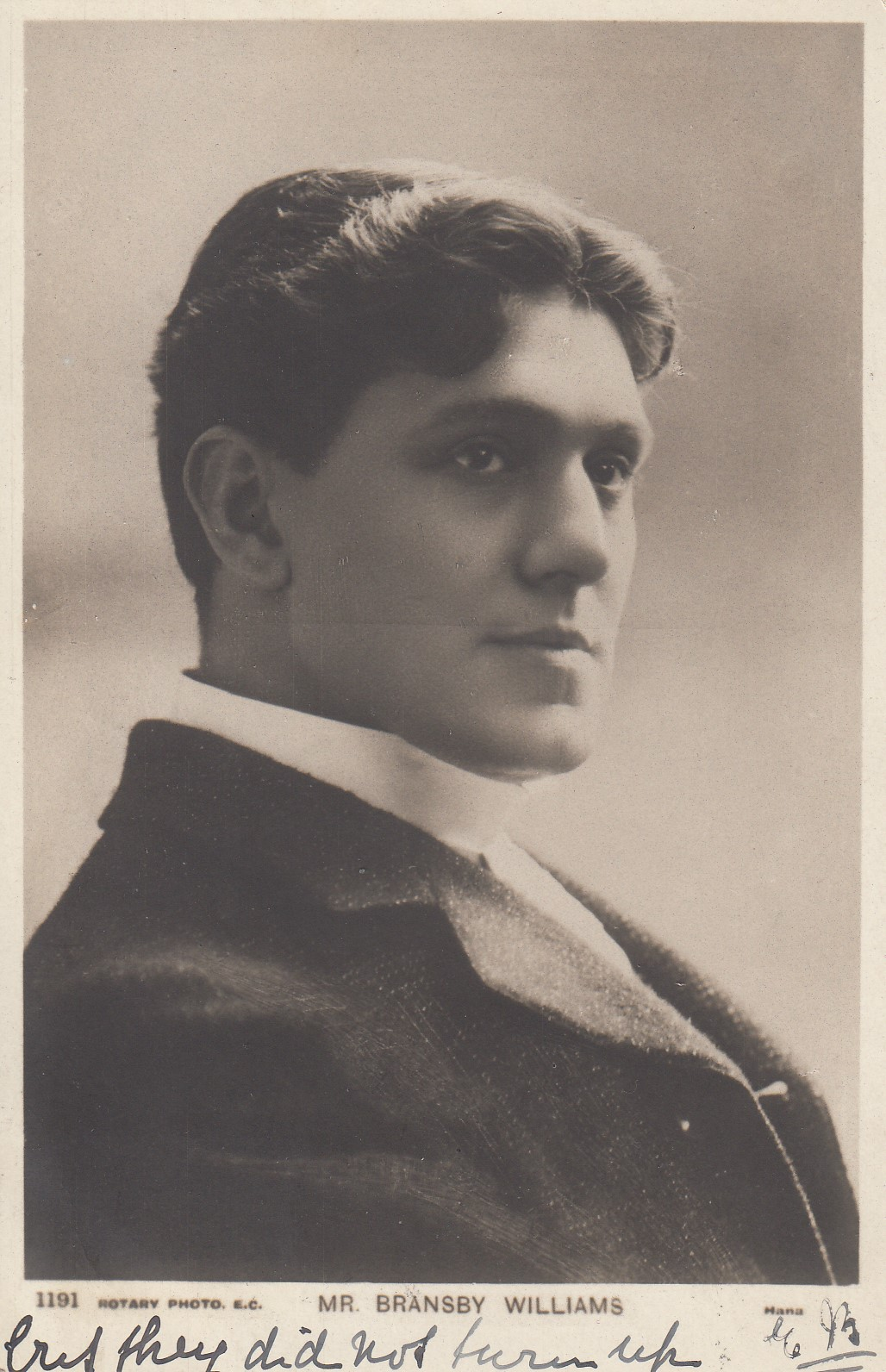
Portrait of actor Bransby Williams.

Williams regularly appeared in pantomime, making his first appearance in that medium playing the Baron in Babes in the Wood at the Shakespeare Theatre in Liverpool in 1906, and appearing at the London Palladium as 'Abanazer' in Aladdin in 1926. He appeared in a Royal Variety Performance before King George V and Queen Mary on 27 May 1926. Another tour of Canada in 1928 was a financial failure, and Williams returned to Great Britain in 1929 to appear in variety.

== Later years ==
Later in his career Williams was a regular on radio and television. In 1946 he toured in an adaptation of Edward Percy's The Shop at Sly Corner. In 1950 he played Ebenezer Scrooge in a BBC television version of A Christmas Carol. Also in 1950, aged 80, he toured as Maddoc Thomas in The Light of the Heart. For the BBC, he played the role of Mathias, made famous by Henry Irving, in a live television production of The Bells on 14 March 1950. He had first played the role on stage over fifty years before while on tour. He also was a guest on the BBC radio show Desert Island Discs on 4 November 1957 and appeared on BBC Television's This is Your Life in 1958, when he was surprised by Eamonn Andrews at the BBC Television Theatre.

He appeared in a number of films, including Royal England, a Story of an Empire's Throne (1911); Hard Times (1915) as Gradgrind; the title role in Adam Bede (1918); The Adventures of Mr Pickwick (1921); Scrooge (1928), made in the DeForest Phonofilm sound-on-film process; The Common Touch (1941); Those Kids from Town (1942); Tomorrow We Live (1943); The Agitator (1945) and Judgment Deferred (1952). He also made a number of audio recordings for Edison, including The Awakening of Scrooge and The Street Watchman's Christmas, both in 1913.

Following his death, a plaque was unveiled to his memory in the actors' church St Paul's in Covent Garden by Sir Michael Redgrave.

== Personal life ==
Williams married Emilie Margaret Dent in London on 20 February 1892. He died in London in 1961 aged 91 and was survived by his daughters, Winnie, Ida and Betty, and by his son, the actor Eric Bransby Williams. His eldest son, Captain William George Bransby Williams, MC, RFC (6 January 1898 – 12 May 1917) (known as "Sonny") was killed during World War I. His body was never found.

Bransby Williams's youngest daughter, Betty (1909–2001) had a son Eric Paul Corin (born 1948), who runs Magnificent Music Machines, near Liskeard in Cornwall. Here, as well as hearing Player Pianos and the 1929 Wurlitzer Theatre Organ from the Regent Cinema, Brighton, one can hear recordings of Bransby Williams, on phonograph cylinders and 78 r.p.m. records.

== Selected filmography ==
- Hard Times (1915)
- Adam Bede (1918)
- Soldiers of the King (1933)
- Hearts of Humanity (1936)
- The Song of the Road (1937)
- The Trojan Brothers (1946)

== Publications ==
- Williams, Bransby An Actor's Story, Chapman & Hall, London (1909)
- Williams, Bransby My Sketches From Dickens, Chapman & Hall, London (1913)
- Williams, Bransby Bransby Williams, by Himself, Hutchinson, London (1954)
