= What Have You Done to Solange? =

- Italian theatrical release poster
- Italian: Cosa avete fatto a Solange?
- Directed by: Massimo Dallamano
- Screenplay by: Bruno Di Geronimo; Massimo Dallamano
- Produced by: Fulvio Lucisano; Leo Pescarolo; Horst Wendlandt
- Starring: Fabio Testi; Karin Baal; Joachim Fuchsberger; Cristina Galbó; Camille Keaton; Günther Stoll; Claudia Butenuth
- Cinematography: Aristide Massaccesi
- Edited by: Clarissa Ambach; Antonio Siciliano
- Music by: Ennio Morricone
- Production companies: Italian International Films S.r.l.; Clodio Cinematografica; Rialto Film
- Distributed by: Italian International Film (Italy); Constantin Film (West Germany)
- Release date: 9 March 1972
- Running time: 103 minutes
- Countries: Italy; West Germany
- Language: English
- Box office: 846 million Italian lire (Italy)

What Have You Done to Solange? (Italian: Cosa avete fatto a Solange?) is a 1972 giallo film directed by Massimo Dallamano and starring Fabio Testi, Karin Baal, Joachim Fuchsberger, Cristina Galbó, and Camille Keaton. The plot follows a series of violent murders occurring at a Catholic girls' school in London, where a young student has gone missing.

The film is a co-production between Italian production companies Italian International Films S.r.l., Clodio Cinematografica and West German studio Rialto Film. It was released in Germany as Das Geheimnis der grünen Stecknadel ("The Clue of the New Pin"), where it was promoted an Edgar Wallace krimi film.

== Plot ==
While in a boat making out with her Italian college professor, Enrico Rosseni, Elizabeth Seccles witnesses a man with a knife stabbing another woman in the woods on the nearby shore. Rosseni convinces Elizabeth to keep silent about what she saw, especially after it turns out that the dead victim was one of her classmates and was killed by having a long knife pushed deep into her vagina. Another girl, a student at the same college, is killed later by the same attacker.

Shortly afterwards, Elizabeth is murdered in her bathroom. Police suspect Rosseni, who admits his affair to his sexually repressed wife Herta in hopes of getting her assistance in order to clear his name. Rosseni is cleared when a common denominator is determined by the later killings. The victims all had seen a local priest and were friends with a young woman named Solange, who began attending the school the previous semester but had mysteriously vanished.

Rosseni's investigation ultimately leads to the existence of a hedonistic secret club of college girls that Elizabeth and the other murder victims had belonged to. The police further learn that the priest that several of the victims had spoken to was not a real priest, but was instead Solange's father Professor Bascombe, a wealthy tenured teacher at the same school.

Ruth Holden (aka "Tata") is the elderly maid of Brenda, one of Solange's classmates who was also involved in the sex parties. Ruth is found alongside her dog, viciously murdered by having a sickle rammed into her vagina. Rosseni, Herta, and the police confront the father, who at first denies any wrongdoing until his daughter Solange appears. Mute and appearing emotionally disturbed, she leads Herta to the place where the final sex club member was kidnapped.

Bascombe then confesses to why he murdered his victims. His daughter Solange had befriended the members of the sex club and was granted membership. However, after her first orgy, she became pregnant. The other girls insisted Solange take care of the situation by meeting with Ruth Holden, who also functions as a back-alley abortionist. This event traumatized Solange physically, mentally and emotionally. She is henceforth in a very dull mental state where she functions as a baby would, is no longer able to speak and unable to become pregnant.

After confessing to the murders, Bascombe then takes his own life by shooting himself at his desk. At some point, he realized that an abortion was what led to Solange becoming an invalid and symbolically performed a similar deed on the girls once they'd given him details of what trauma really befell Solange.

== Cast ==
- Fabio Testi as Enrico Rosseni
- Karin Baal as Herta Rosseni
- Joachim Fuchsberger as Inspector Barth
- Cristina Galbó as Elizabeth Seccles
- Günther Stoll as Professor Bascombe
- Claudia Butenuth as Brenda Pilchard
- Camille Keaton as Solange Beauregard
- Pilar Castel as Janet Bryant
- Giovanna Di Bernardo as Helen Edmonds
- Maria Monti as Mrs. Erickson
- Giancarlo Badessi as Mr. Erickson
- Antonio Casale as Mr. Newton
- Vittorio Fanfoni as Billings
- Marco Mariani as Father Webber
- Emilia Wolkowicz as Ruth Holden
- Daniele Micheletti as Mr. Bryant
- Antonio Anelli as Father Herbert
- Rainer Penkert as Mr. Leach
- Carla Mancini as Susan Mills
- John Gayford as Joseph Kane
- Maria Michi as Mrs. Pilchard
- Joe D'Amato as CID Man

== Production ==
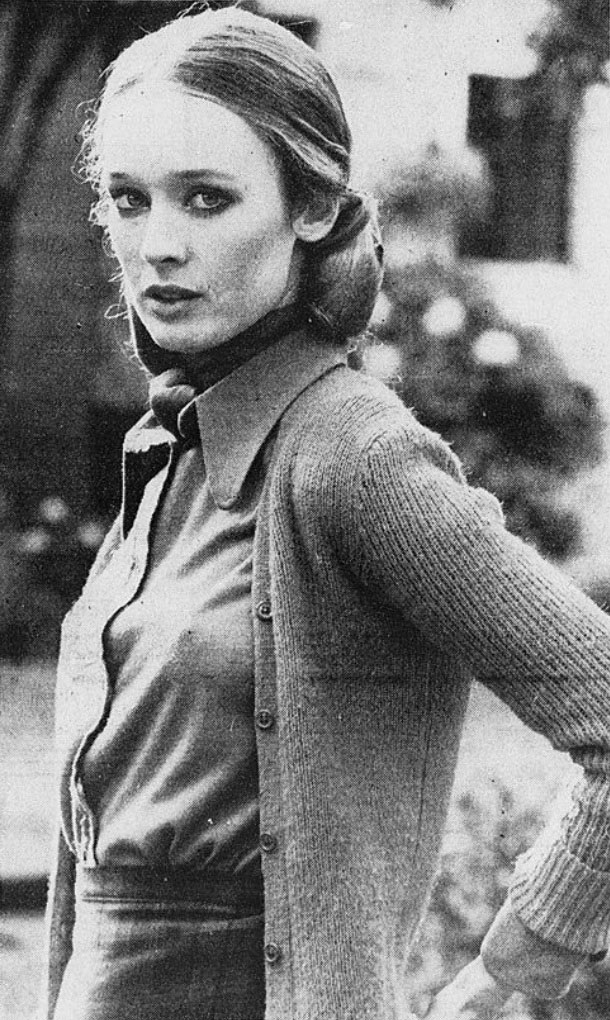
Camille Keaton in 1972, the year What Have You Done to Solange? was released

What Have You Done to Solange? was an Italian and West German co-production, and credits itself as being based on The Clue of the New Pin by Edgar Wallace. The film bears very little relationship to the novel, with authors and film historians Kim Newman and Michael Mackenzie believing that it was marketed this way to sell the film to a German audience as part of the krimi film genre. The relationship to the genre is enhanced by the appearance of cast members Joachim Fuchsberger and Karin Baal who appeared in several Edgar Wallace adaptations produced by Rialto Film in the 1960s. American actress Camille Keaton was cast in the film—her debut role—as Solange. Keaton had originally sent in photos for a casting call for a Franco Zeffirelli film. She was not cast in his film, but received a call from director Massimo Dallamano later to invite her in for the role. Keaton described working with Dallamano as challenging, as she had only recently begun learning to speak Italian, while he spoke very little English. For her role, Dallamano told her that she was looking for someone who looked frail and ordered her not to tan while filming.

== Release ==
What Have You Done to Solange? was released in both Italy and West Germany on March 9, 1972. Fulvio Lucisano stated that the film was the first giallo film to be shown at the Adriano Theater in Rome, which normally did not show films of the genre. The film was one of the highest grossing gialli in the 1971-1972 season, grossing 846 million Italian lire.

A US release renamed it as The Rah Rah Girls and the trailer presented it as a sex comedy.

In West Germany, it was released under the title Das Geheimnis der grünen Stecknadel where it was distributed by Constantin. The film has been released under various English-language titles, including The Secret of the Green Pin, The School That Couldn't Scream, and Who's Next?. It is most commonly known under the title What Have You Done to Solange?. In 2005, the Venice Film Festival had a day in honour of Fulvio Lucisano Day as part of its "Secret History of Italian Cinema" screenings, which included a screening of a restored version of What Have You Done to Solange?.

What Have You Done to Solange? was first released on DVD by Shriek Show on July 30, 2002. It was released by Arrow Video on Blu-ray and DVD in the United Kingdom on December 14, 2015 and in the United States on December 15, 2015. Film Comment placed Arrow Video's release of What Have You Done to Solange? at 15th on their list of top Blu-ray releases of 2015.

== Reception ==
In contemporary reviews, the German newspaper Hamburger Abendblatt found the film to be "too broad" but stated that quality acting from Karin Baal, Fabio Testi, Joachim Fuchsberger and Günther Stoll enhance the film. Italian newspaper La Stampa praised the acting of Fabio Testi, Joachim Fuchsberger and Karin Baal while stating the director developed the mystery in the story well.

From retrospective reviews, Robert Firsching of AllMovie called the film a "first-rate thriller," a "creepy mystery", and noted "Massimo Dallamano's direction is assured." Video Librarian stated that the film is "considered a classic of the Italian horror genre known as giallo" but "For all the characteristic sloppiness of the screenplay, this film remains unusual and surprising, with some well-directed murder scenes and startling imagery." and it was "shamelessly salacious in its exploitation of girls as sexual objects and unsavory in that these minors are assaulted in a vicious, sadistic, and hateful manner" and that ultimately "the extreme violence against young women makes it hard to enjoy". Danny Shipka, author of a book on European exploitation films found the film to be "One of the most satisfying gialli of its day" and that it had "the right amount of sleaze and story to carry the audience through all the twists and turns with an emotionally satisfying ending." The review commented that Dallamano took a "serious approach to the subgenre, creating situations that will stay long after you've finished the film." The Herald proclaimed the film as "a prime example of "giallo"" and that the film was "better than it sounds" and described it as an influence on Peter Strickand's film The Duke of Burgundy (2014).

== Aftermath and influence ==
What Have You Done to Solange? is the first entry in a loosely linked series of film called the Schoolgirls in Peril trilogy, a series of films based on the sexual exploits of young girls and their reaction to the adults. By 1974, audiences began to grow tired of the giallo genre and began having interest in other European genres such as the poliziotteschi, urban cop thrillers that were influenced by American films such as Dirty Harry (1971) and The French Connection (1971). Dallamano's next film in the Schoolgirls in Peril trilogy was What Have They Done to Your Daughters? (1974), a film with similar themes to What Have You Done to Solange?. The final part of the series was Red Rings of Fear (1978). Dallamano is credited as a screenwriter on the film. He had intended to direct it, but died before the film began production.

Director Nicolas Winding Refn announced in 2016 that he was seeking a director and screenwriter for a remake of What Have You Done to Solange?. The film will be produced by Refn's Space Rocket Nation banner along with producer Fulvio Lucisano.

== See also ==
- List of German films of the 1970s
- List of Italian films of 1972
- List of giallo films

== Sources ==
- "What Have You Done to Solange? (1972) - Releases". AllMovie. Archived from the original on November 25, 2015.
- "What Have You Done To Solange? Dual Format DVD and Blu-Ray". Arrow Films. Archived from the original on September 14, 2015.
- "Top 20 Blu-Ray". Film Comment. Vol. 51, no. 6. Film Society of Lincoln Center. November 2015. pp. 74–75. ISSN 0015-119X.
- "Das Geheimnis der grünen Stecknadel". Filmportal.de. Archived from the original on December 7, 2024.
- "Delitto al college" [Murder at College]. La Stampa (in Italian). March 24, 1972. Archived from the original on January 7, 2017.
- Axmaker, S. (2016). "What Have You Done to Solange?". Video Librarian. Vol. 31, no. 2. p. 48. ISSN 0887-6851.
- Bergfelder, Tim (2005). International Adventures: German Popular Cinema and European Co-productions in the 1960s. Berghahn Books. ISBN 1571815384.
- Bericht, Eigener (10 June 1972). "Das gibt es selbst in Chikago nicht" [You Won't Even find That in Chicago] (PDF). Hamburger Abendblatt (in German). Archived from the original (PDF) on January 1, 2015.
- Curti, Roberto (2022). Italian Giallo in Film and Television. McFarland & Company. ISBN 978-1-4766-8248-8.
- Didcock, Barry (December 23, 2015). "DVD reviews:The Bridge Trilogy (15); What Have You Done To Solange? (18); The Cobbler (12)". The Herald. Glasgow, Scotland. Archived from the original on December 21, 2024.
- Ettinger, Art (2015). Camille Keaton: Solange and Beyond (booklet). Arrow Films. FCD1198.
- Firsching, Robert. "What Have You Done to Solange? (1972) - Trailers, Reviews, Synopsis, Showtimes and Cast - AllMovie". AllMovie. Archived from the original on April 14, 2012.
- Hanley, Ken W. (May 23, 2016). "Nicolas Winding Refn Announces 'Remake Trilogy' with Vincent Price, Giallo Classics!". Fangoria. Archived from the original on September 23, 2016.
- Mackenzie, Michael (2015). Innocence Lost (Blu ray). Arrow Films. FCD1198.
- Schneider, Steven Jay (2007). 100 European Horror Films. British Film Institute. ISBN 978-1-844-57164-2.
- Shipka, Danny (2011). Perverse Titillation: The Exploitation Cinema of Italy, Spain and France, 1960–1980. McFarland & Company. ISBN 978-0786448883.
- Vivarelli, Nick (May 13, 2008). "Fulvio Lucisano Still Going Strong". Variety. Archived from the original on October 22, 2016.
