= Uncle Dick's Darling =

1920 film directed by Fred Paul

- Directed by: Fred Paul
- Written by: R. Byron Webber
- Produced by: John Robyns
- Production company: British Standard
- Distributed by: Anchor
- Release date: December 1920
- Country: United Kingdom
- Languages: Silent; English intertitles

Uncle Dick's Darling is a 1920 British silent comedy film directed by Fred Paul and starring George Bellamy, Athalie Davis and Humberston Wright. It is based on a play of the same name by H. J. Byron.

== Cast ==
- George Bellamy as Uncle Dick
- Athalie Davis as Mary
- Humberston Wright as Chevenix
- Ronald Power as Mr. Lorimer
- Sydney Folker
- Frank Dane
- Gordon Craig

== Bibliography ==
- Low, Rachael. History of the British Film, 1918-1929. George Allen & Unwin, 1971.
