= Irene Rooke =

English actress (1874–1958)

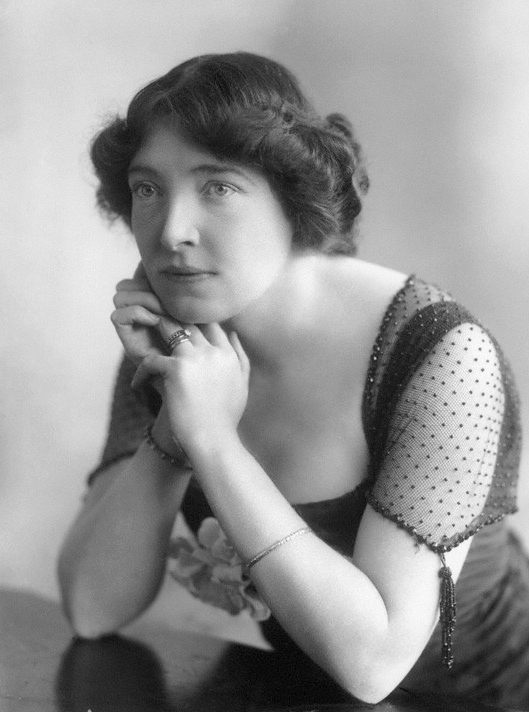
- Rooke in 1913
- Born: Irene Bessie Ingaretha Rooke; 30 May 1874; Bridport, Dorset, England, U.K.
- Died: 14 June 1958 (aged 84); Chesham, Buckinghamshire, England, U.K.
- Occupation: Actress
- Years active: 1896–1938
- Spouse: Milton Rosmer (m. 1919)

Irene Rooke (born Irene Bessie Ingaretha Rooke; 30 May 1874 – 14 June 1958) was an English theatre and film actress from Bridport, Dorset, England.

== Stage career ==
She was the daughter of a prominent London journalist. Rooke left boarding school in 1896 and went directly on the stage. Unlike many novices, she achieved quick success as an actress.

In 1897 she performed the role of Ophelia in Hamlet. Edward Gordon Craig appeared in the title role. Rooke played the part of the Christian maiden, Mercia, in The Sign of the Cross. The play was adapted from the historical drama written by Wilson Barrett. The production was staged at the Fourteenth Street Theatre in New York in October 1898. The entire company was composed of actors from London's Lyric Theatre.

Rooke was in an original production of Quality Street prior to creating the character of the charwoman in The Silver Box. The latter was the first John Galsworthy play to be produced. It was staged in 1906. Rooke is remembered for depicting characters who were "quiet but valiant, misunderstood but uncomplaining".

She acted the part of Kate Hardcastle in the Ben Greet production of She Stoops To Conquer. Rooke's performance was well received as was the character played by Julia Reynolds. They performed together on the Oberlin, Ohio stage in March 1908. The Greet Company presented A Midsummer Night's Dream by William Shakespeare to audiences in La Crosse, Wisconsin, in 1909. Rooke trained under and toured with Greet. She also appeared in support of E. H. Sothern.

Her acting range was broad. She demonstrated this in 1913 while touring Canada with the company of Annie Horniman. On this trip Rooke played parts including the title roles in The Second Mrs. Tanqueray, Major Barbara, and Alice Sit-by-the-Fire.

In the latter stages of her stage career she impressed critics most vividly with her rendition of the mother in Oliver Cromwell. The theatrical production was adapted from the writing of John Drinkwater. Rooke played an old woman who relished the cause of freedom, yet who loved poetry even more.

== Films ==
Rooke was in films beginning with her role opposite Nigel Playfair in Lady Windermere's Fan (1916). In the drama The Street of Adventure (1921), she was cast with Lionelle Howard and Margot Drake. Rooke appeared as Catherine de' Medici in The Loves of Mary, Queen of Scots (1923). The 16th century historical drama featured Fay Compton and Jack Cardiff. She also featured in the 1927 film version of the popular stage play Hindle Wakes, directed by Maurice Elvey and starring Estelle Brody and John Stuart.

Her final films were released in 1932, both of them British titles produced by G. B. Samuelson. Rooke depicted Lady Grathers in Threads and Mrs. Maynard in Collision.

== Death ==
Rooke died in Chesham, Buckinghamshire, England, in 1958. She retired from the theatre more than twenty years prior to her death. She was married to Milton Rosmer.

== Selected filmography ==
- Lady Windermere's Fan (1916)
- Westward Ho! (1919)
- Pillars of Society (1920)
- A Bachelor Husband (1920)
- The Street of Adventure (1921)
- Half a Truth (1922)
- Running Water (1922)
- The Loves of Mary, Queen of Scots (1923)
- Hindle Wakes (1927)
- Collision (1932)
- Threads (1932)
