= The Street of Adventure (novel) =

1909 novel by Philip Gibbs

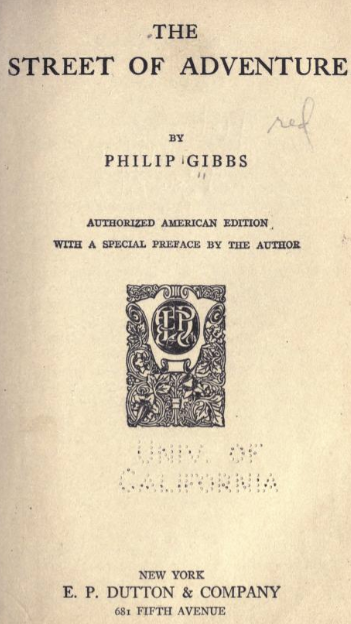
- Title page for The Street of Adventure (1919 edition)
- Author: Philip Gibbs
- Language: English
- Genre: Drama
- Publication date: 1909
- Publication place: United Kingdom
- Media type: Print

The Street of Adventure is a 1909 novel by the British writer Philip Gibbs. A newspaper reporter attempts to save a young woman from prostitution. The title refers to the hero's profession of journalism, as it was an alternative name used for Fleet Street. It has been described as "the first best-selling novel about newspaper reporters".

In 1921 the novel was adapted into a film The Street of Adventure directed by Kenelm Foss.

== Bibliography ==
- Goble, Alan. The Complete Index to Literary Sources in Film. Walter de Gruyter, 1999.
- Rankin, Nicholas. A Genius for Deception: How Cunning Helped the British Win Two World Wars. Oxford University Press, 2009.
