= Consequences (1918 film) =

1918 British film by Arthur Rooke

- Directed by: Arthur Rooke
- Written by: Kenelm Foss (screenplay)
- Starring: Gordon Craig, Joyce Templeton, J. Hastings Batson
- Release date: 1918
- Country: United Kingdom
- Language: Silent

Consequences is a 1918 British silent comedy film directed by Arthur Rooke and starring Gordon Craig, Joyce Templeton and J. Hastings Batson. The screenplay was written by Kenelm Foss.

== Partial cast ==
- Gordon Craig as Bobbie
- Joyce Templeton as Joyce
- J. Hastings Batson as Guardian
