= Dawn (1928 film) =

1928 British film by Herbert Wilcox

- Movie poster
- Directed by: Herbert Wilcox
- Written by: Reginald Berkeley (play); Robert Cullen; Herbert Wilcox
- Produced by: Herbert Wilcox
- Starring: Sybil Thorndike; Ada Bodart; Gordon Craig; Marie Ault
- Cinematography: Bernard Knowles
- Production company: British & Dominions Film Corporation
- Distributed by: Woolf & Freedman Film Service
- Release date: 1 March 1928
- Running time: 90 minutes
- Country: United Kingdom
- Language: English

Dawn is a 1928 British silent war film directed by Herbert Wilcox and starring Sybil Thorndike, Gordon Craig, and Marie Ault. It was produced by Wilcox for his British & Dominions Film Corporation. The film was made at Cricklewood Studios in London with sets designed by the art director Clifford Pember.

Based on a play by Reginald Berkeley, this film tells the story of World War I martyr Edith Cavell. Sybil Thorndike stars as Cavell, a nurse who risked her own life by rescuing British prisoners of war from the Germans. When Cavell was captured and sentenced to be executed, it sparked international outrage, even from neutral nations.

== Production ==
Herbert Wilcox had just made Mumsie (1927), starring Pauline Frederick. Wilcox wanted to make another film with Frederick and suggested Noël Coward's The Vortex but Frederick disliked the role. Wilcox then saw the statue of Edith Cavell in London and decided to make a film of her life.

Frederick was enthusiastic at first but dropped out. Some claimed it was because there was an outcry at the thought of an American playing Cavell. Wilcox claims Frederick was scared off after the German ambassador said that Germany would boycott her films. She was replaced with Sybil Thorndike. Filming proved difficult.

== Censorship ==
One of the most controversial British films of the 1920s, Dawn was censored because of what objectors considered its brutal depiction of warfare and anti-German sentiment. Pressure was exerted by both the German Ambassador and the British Foreign Secretary Austen Chamberlain to prevent the film being passed for exhibition.

Edith Cavell's sister criticised the film saying it would promote hate. However, George Bernard Shaw praised the film. When eventually released, the film was a big success.

Wilcox returned to the subject in 1939 with Nurse Edith Cavell starring Anna Neagle.

== Cast ==
- Sybil Thorndike as Nurse Edith Cavell
- Ada Bodart as Herself
- Gordon Craig as Philippe Bodart
- Marie Ault as Mme. Rappard
- Mickey Brantford as Jacques Rappard
- Mary Brough as Mme. Pitou
- Richard Worth as Jean Pitou – Bargekeeper
- Colin Bell as Widow Deveaux
- Dacia Deane as Mme. Deveaux's Daughter
- Cecil Barry as Col. Schultz
- Frank Perfitt as Gen. von Zauberzweig
- Haddon Mason as German A.P.M.
- Maurice Braddell as British Airman
- Edward O'Neill as Lutheran Priest
- Griffith Humphreys as President of the Court Martial
- Edward Sorley as German Soldier

== Bibliography ==
- Low, Rachael. History of the British Film, 1918–1929. George Allen & Unwin, 1971.
