= Will Corrie =

British actor

Will Corrie (14 January 1867 - 1950) was a British actor of the silent era.

== Selected filmography ==
- Hard Times (1915)
- The Laughing Cavalier (1917)
- The Manxman (1917)
- Tom Jones (1917)
- Dombey and Son (1917)
- The Romance of Lady Hamilton (1919)
- The March Hare (1919)
- I Will (1919)
- Fancy Dress (1919)
- The Breed of the Treshams (1920)
- A Bachelor Husband (1920)
- The Amateur Gentleman (1920)
- The Headmaster (1921)
- Cherry Ripe (1921)
- The Street of Adventure (1921)
