= Maudie Edwards =

Welsh actress (1906–1991)

- Born: Elizabeth Maud Edwards; 16 October 1906; Neath, Glamorgan, Wales
- Died: 24 March 1991 (aged 84); London, England
- Occupations: Actress; broadcaster; singer; dancer; comedienne
- Years active: 1910-1972
- Spouses: Walter Nicholas-Marcy (m. 1954; div. 1958) William Fooks (m. 1958)

Elizabeth Maud Edwards (16 October 1906 – 24 March 1991), professionally known as Maudie Edwards, was a Welsh actress, radio broadcaster, comedian, dancer and singer, best remembered for having spoken the first line of dialogue in soap opera Coronation Street, and playing Elsie Lappin in the first two episodes. She was previously best known to listeners of the radio programme Welsh Rarebit, which attracted weekly audiences of 10 million.

== Early life ==
Born in 16 Florence Street, Neath, Glamorgan, Wales, to semi-professional comedian and singer Ned Edwards, she appeared on stage at the age of four, with her sister May, as Ned Edwards' Two Little Queenies.

== Career ==
Edwards would go on to play the principal boy in many pantomimes.

She presented her signature tune before radio broadcasts of Welsh Rarebit with the lyrics:

I bring you the voice of the people from over the hills and dales

and the voice of the people is brought to you by a voice that comes from Wales

Edwards had a talent for comedy, and formed her own repertory company, The Maudie Edwards Players, who performed in the Palace Theatre, Swansea. In films of the 1940s, she provided a singing voice for film stars Diana Dors, Margaret Lockwood and Gene Tierney. Edwards wrote some of her own material.

She made her first screen appearance in 1936 and her last in 1972. In 1950, she appeared on stage with Frank Sinatra at the London Palladium. She played Elsie Lappin in the first two episodes of British soap opera Coronation Street in 1960 and was the first performer to speak during the first scene in the show's history: "Now the next thing you've got to do is to get a signwriter in - that thing above the door'll have to be changed."

== Personal life and death ==
In 1954, Edwards married Walter Nicholas-Marcy, a businessman, in Westminster. Four years later, she married Colonel William Fooks in St Pancras.

Edwards spent her final years living in Putney, southwest London. She died in London, aged 84, in 1991, predeceasing Fooks. Edwards bequeathed her archive material to the Victoria and Albert Museum.

== Filmography ==
- The Flying Doctor (1936)
- My Learned Friend (1943)
- The Shipbuilders (1943)
- I'll Be Your Sweetheart (1945) (singing voice of Margaret Lockwood)
- Query (1945)
- Pink String and Sealing Wax (1945)
- Murder in Reverse? (1945)
- Walking on Air (1946)
- School for Randle (1949)
- Girdle of Gold (1952)
- Diamond City (1949) dubbed singing voice of Diana Dors
- Night and the City as dubbed singing voice of Gene Tierney
- Take a Powder (1953)
- The Strange World of Planet X (TV series, 1956)
- The Errol Flynn Theatre (TV series, 1956)
- Life at Stake (1957)
- The Ugly Duckling (1959)
- Coronation Street (TV series, 1960)
- The Edgar Wallace Mystery Theatre (TV series, 1961)
- The Clue of the New Pin (1961)
- Only Two Can Play (1962)
- Dixon of Dock Green (TV series, 1962)
- Band of Thieves (1962)
- Under Milk Wood (1972)
- Burke & Hare (1972)
