= Take a Powder =

1953 British film

- Directed by: Lionel Tomlinson; Julian Vedey
- Written by: Rex Diamond; Julian Vedey
- Produced by: Lionel Tomlinson; Derrick Wynne
- Starring: Julian Vedey; Max Bacon; Isabel George
- Cinematography: Ernest Palmer
- Edited by: Oscar Burn
- Production company: RLT Productions
- Distributed by: Apex Film Distributors
- Release date: 1953
- Running time: 58 minutes
- Country: United Kingdom
- Language: English

Take a Powder is a 1953 British second feature ('B') comedy film directed by Lionel Tomlinson and Julian Vedey and starring Vedey, Max Bacon and Isabel George. It was written by Rex Diamond and Vedey, and made at Brighton Studios. The plot is set against the backdrop of the developing Cold War.

== Plot ==
Atomic scientist Professor Schultz is a hospital doctor and is kidnapped by a foreign power interested in his research. Meanwhile, Maxie, a market trader quack seeing selling his "Cure-All Atomic Powder" is mistaken for Schultz and put in charge of the hospital. With the help of a Scotland Yard detective, Schultz's niece Betty rescues the Professor.

== Cast ==
- Julian Vedey as Professor Schultz
- Max Bacon as Maxie
- Isabel George as Betty
- Maudie Edwards as Matron
- Neville Gates as Bill
- Fred Kitchen Jr. as Dr. Fowler
- Alexis Chesnakov as Dr. Stroganoff
- Larry Taylor as Spike
- Bobby Beaumont
- Gordon Craig
- Joe Cunningham
- Mark Singleton
- Muriel White
- Diana Wynne

== Reception ==
The Monthly Film Bulletin wrote: "There is a germ of fun in this artless little film, but its crazy comedy develops at too slow a pace. Max Bacon, as the quack medicine man, over-works his effects and rarely raises a laugh; the rest of the playing is adequate."

Kine Weekly wrote: "The picture is little more than an inflated music-hall sketch and there is more than enough of Max Bacon, who overworks solecisms, as Maxie, but Maudie Edwards, amusing as the matron, Fred Kitchen, jun., an effective foil as an inhibited medico, and Isabel George and Neville Gates, adequate as Betty and Bill, make the most of the by-play. Patchy, yet disarmingly iingenuous, it has its moments."

Picturegoer wrote: "You should take that title literally. Featuring Max Bacon, this film attempts to parody conventional atomic spy melodrama, but soon gets trapped in a county hospital and endlessly walks the white corridors in a vain search for laughs and thrills. Max Bacon, cast as a travelling medicine man mistaken for a well-known scientist, bores with the laboured wisecracks the script has given him. Old-timers Maudie Edwards and Fred Kitchen improvise effectively, but fail to achieve the impossible and carry both the star and the script."

Picture Show wrote: "Comedy and melodrama are somewhat mixed in this story of a marketplace "atomic powder" seller who is mistaken for an eminent research worker ... Max Bacon does his best to carry the film along with his lively personality and extraordinary English."

TV Gude wrote; "Stupefyingly unfunny from beginning to end."

In British Sound Films: The Studio Years 1928–1959 David Quinlan rated the film as "poor", writing: "Artless comedy lurches slowly along in vain search for laughs or thrills."
