= Hard Times (1915 film) =

- Directed by: Thomas Bentley
- Written by: Charles Dickens (novel); Thomas Bentley
- Starring: Bransby Williams; Leon M. Lion; Dorothy Bellew
- Production company: Transatlantic Films
- Distributed by: Transatlantic Films
- Release date: September 1915
- Country: United Kingdom
- Language: English

Hard Times is a 1915 British silent drama film directed by Thomas Bentley and starring Bransby Williams, Leon M. Lion and Dorothy Bellew. It is based on the 1854 novel Hard Times by Charles Dickens.

== Cast ==
- Bransby Williams as Gradgrind
- Leon M. Lion as Tom Gradgrind
- Dorothy Bellew as Louisa
- Madge Tree as Rachael
- Mr. Forrest as Stephen Blackpool
- F. Lymons as Josiah Bounderby
- Will Corrie as Sleary
- Clara Cooper as Cissie Jupe
- J. Wynn Slater as James Harthouse

== Bibliography ==
- Giddings, Robert & Sheen, Erica. From Page to Screen: Adaptations of the Classic Novel. Manchester University Press, 5 May 2000
- Mee, John. The Cambridge Introduction to Charles Dickens. Cambridge University Press, 2010.
