= Girdle of Gold =

1952 British film by Montgomery Tully

- Theatrical release poster
- Directed by: Montgomery Tully
- Written by: Jack Dawe
- Produced by: Darcy Conyers; Audrey Hirst
- Starring: Esmond Knight; Maudie Edwards; Meredith Edwards
- Cinematography: Jack Asher
- Edited by: James Needs
- Music by: Philip Green
- Production company: London Screenplays
- Distributed by: Eros Films
- Release date: 1952
- Running time: 66 minutes
- Country: United Kingdom
- Language: English

Girdle of Gold is a 1952 British second feature comedy film directed by Montgomery Tully and starring Esmond Knight, Maudie Edwards and Meredith Edwards. It was written by Jack Dawe.

== Plot ==
In a small Welsh town, Griffiths the Hearse, a crafty undertaker, hides £150 that he has kept from his wife in the lining of her girdle. Unknown to him she is about to elope with Evans the Milk, the local milkman. Shortly before she does, she sells the girdle and buys a new one. The old one is sold on to newlywed Mary Rees who leaves for her honeymoon in London. This results in a frantic effort to recover it both by Griffiths, still after the stashed money, and Evans who wants to clear his name of accusations of theft.

== Cast ==
- Esmond Knight as Evans the Milk
- Maudie Edwards as Mrs. Griffiths
- Meredith Edwards as Griffiths the Hearse
- Petra Davies as Mary Rees
- Glyn Houston as Dai Thomas
- Tonie MacMillan as Mrs. Macey
- Kenneth Evans as Sergt. Mortimer
- Roger Maxwell as Chairman of Bench
- Humphrey Morton as hotel manager
- Ivan Craig as Hotel Detective
- Rigby Foster as Mr. Morgan
- Isabel George as hotel receptionist
- Mark Singleton as waiter
- Denis Shaw as choirmaster
- Arthur Mullard as Court Police Officer
- Jim O'Brady as Hotel Doorman
- Pat Ryan as juror
- Bill Shine as juror

== Production ==
The film was shot at Walton Studios near London with location shooting taking place in the capital. The film's sets were designed by the art director Don Russell.

== Critical reception ==
The Monthly Film Bulletin wrote: "Here is an idea which in French hands might be light, gay and funny. As it is, it moves ponderously and sadly, with good lines poorly rendered and situations amateurishly acted, though it is obvious that immense efforts are being made to be slick and polished. Esmond Knight will never make a good 'Milk,' but the 'Hearse' is realistically the unsuccessful undertaker."

Kine Weekly wrote: "Lively, if unpretentious, small-town farcical comedy, with a Welsh accent. ... The majority of the players are equal to story demands, but both the direction and the staging are a trifle rough. Its foolproof central idea should, however, get it over with the industrial and provincial masses. ... The picture has quite a piquant tale and one that lends itself logically to striptease, but the fun is restricted by meagre production. Cheap presentation also makes it a doubtful proposition for first-class halls, but the majority of the gags are certain to raise chuckles in most other situations."

In British Sound Films: The Studio Years 1928–1959 David Quinlan rated the film as "mediocre", writing: "Good comedy idea ploddingly handled."
