= Lady Windermere's Fan (1916 film) =

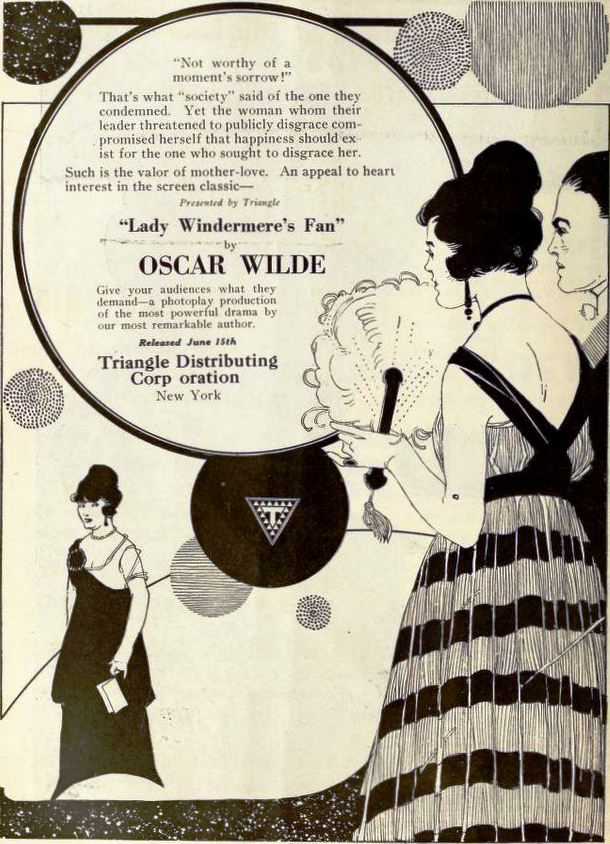
- Ad for 1919 American release of film
- Directed by: Fred Paul
- Written by: Oscar Wilde (play); Benedict James
- Starring: Milton Rosmer; Netta Westcott; Nigel Playfair; Arthur Wontner
- Production company: Ideal Film Company
- Distributed by: Ideal Film Company
- Release date: July 1916
- Running time: 66 minutes
- Country: United Kingdom
- Language: Silent (English intertitles)

Lady Windermere's Fan is a 1916 British silent comedy film directed by Fred Paul and starring Milton Rosmer, Netta Westcott and Nigel Playfair. It was the first film adaptation of Oscar Wilde's 1892 play Lady Windermere's Fan. A print of the film still exists and it has been released on DVD by the British Film Institute.

== Cast ==
- Milton Rosmer - Lord Windermere
- Netta Westcott - Lady Windermere
- Nigel Playfair - Lord Augustus Lorton
- Irene Rooke - Mrs Erlynne
- Arthur Wontner - Lord Darlington
- Alice De Winton - Duchess of Berwick
- E. Vivian Reynolds - Mr Dumby
- Joyce Kerr - Agatha
- Evan Thomas - Cecil Graham
- Sydney Vautier - Hopper
