= A Bachelor Husband =

1920 film by Kenelm Foss

- Directed by: Kenelm Foss
- Written by: Ruby M. Ayres; Kenelm Foss
- Produced by: H.W. Thompson; Frank E. Spring
- Starring: Lyn Harding; Renee Mayer; Hayford Hobbs
- Production company: Astra Films
- Distributed by: Astra Films
- Release date: October 1920
- Country: United Kingdom
- Languages: Silent; English intertitles

A Bachelor Husband is a 1920 British silent romance film directed by Kenelm Foss and starring Lyn Harding, Renee Mayer and Hayford Hobbs. It was based on a story by Ruby M. Ayres, originally published in the Daily Mirror.

== Plot ==
Inheritor weds stepsister who elopes with cad.

== Cast ==
- Lyn Harding as Feather Dakers
- Renée Mayer as Marie Celeste
- Hayford Hobbs as Chris Lawless
- Irene Rooke as Aunt Madge
- Lionelle Howard as Atkins
- Gordon Craig as Chris, as a child
- Margot Drake as Mrs. Chester
- Will Corrie as George Chester
- R. Heaton Grey as Aston Knight
- Phyllis Joyce as Mrs. Heriot

== Bibliography ==
- Low, Rachael. History of the British Film, 1918-1929. George Allen & Unwin, 1971.
