= The Wonderful Year (film) =

1921 film

- Directed by: Kenelm Foss
- Written by: William John Locke (novel); Kenelm Foss
- Produced by: H.W. Thompson
- Starring: Randle Ayrton; Mary Odette; Margot Drake
- Cinematography: Frank Canham
- Edited by: John Miller
- Production company: Astra Films
- Distributed by: Astra Films
- Release date: September 1921
- Country: United Kingdom
- Languages: Silent; English intertitles

The Wonderful Year is a 1921 British silent drama film directed by Kenelm Foss and starring Randle Ayrton, Mary Odette and Margot Drake.

== Cast ==
- Randle Ayrton as The Happiness Dispenser
- Hubert Carter as Bigourdin
- Margot Drake as Corinna Hastings
- Lionelle Howard as Martin Openshaw
- Mary Odette as Felise
- Frank Stanmore as Polydor
- Gwen Williams as Lucilla

== Bibliography ==
- Low, Rachael. History of the British Film, 1918-1929. George Allen & Unwin, 1971.
