= David Horne (actor) =

English actor (1898–1970)

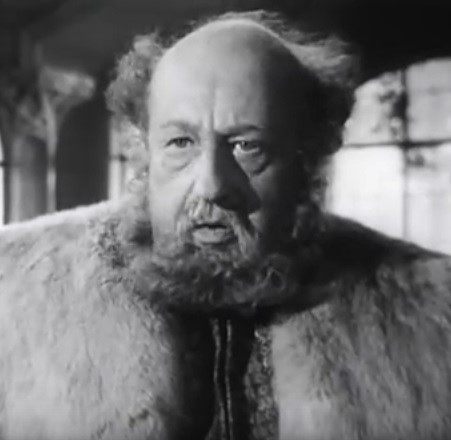
- Horne in Martin Luther (1953)
- Born: David Edgar Alderson Horne; 14 July 1898; Balcombe, Sussex, England
- Died: 15 March 1970 (aged 71); Marylebone, London, England
- Occupation: Actor
- Years active: 1933–1968
- Spouse: Renée Mayer (m. 1924, divorced)

David Edgar Alderson Horne (14 July 1898 in Balcombe, Sussex – 15 March 1970 in Marylebone, London) was an English film and stage actor.

== Biography ==
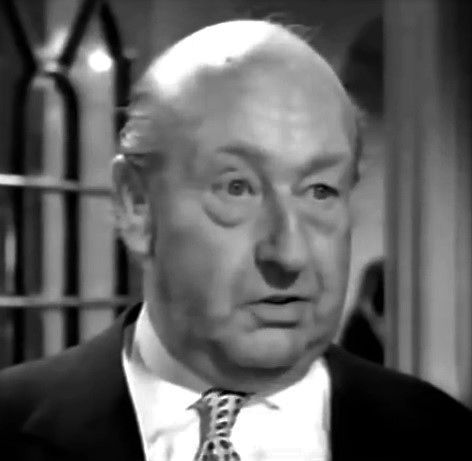
David Horne in the TV series One Step Beyond, episode The Villa, 1961

Horne began his film career in the 1930s, after a distinguished early career in the theatre. He was generally seen portraying pompous, self-satisfied characters. He never managed to rise to the "star" level in his silver screen acting career, but he was an indispensable character actor, and played many utility parts such as desk clerks, newspaper editors, police officials, lawyers and doctors. He continued his theatre work until his death in 1970.

In 1924 he married the former actress Renée Mayer. The marriage was later dissolved.

== Filmography ==
=== Film ===
- Lord of the Manor (1933) as General Sir George Fleeter (film debut)
- General John Regan (1933) as Maj. Kent
- Badger's Green (1934) as Major Forrester
- The Case for the Crown (1934) as James Rainsford
- That's My Uncle (1935) as Col. Marlowe
- The Village Squire (1935) as Squire Hollis
- Late Extra (1935) - Williams as Newspaper Editor
- Hyde Park Corner (1935)
- Gentlemen's Agreement (1935) as Sir Charles Lysle
- Under Proof (1936) as Dr. Walton
- The Cardinal (1936) as English Abbot
- Debt of Honour (1936) as Colonel Mayhew
- It's Love Again (1936) as Durland
- A Touch of the Moon (1936) as Colonel Plattner
- The Interrupted Honeymoon (1936) as Colonel Craddock
- Seven Sinners (1936) as Hotel Manager
- The House of the Spaniard (1936) as 2nd Captain
- Conquest of the Air (1936) as Nero (uncredited)
- The Mill on the Floss (1936) as Mr. Deane (uncredited)
- Farewell Again (1937) as John Carlisle
- The Green Cockatoo (1937) (uncredited)
- Blind Folly (1940) as Mr. Steel
- 21 Days (1940) as Beavis
- The Stars Look Down (1940) as Mr. Wilkins
- Crimes at the Dark House (1940) as Frederick Fairlie
- Return to Yesterday (1940) as Morrison
- Night Train to Munich (1940) as Official at Prague Steel Works (uncredited)
- The Door with Seven Locks (1940) as Edward Havelock
- Inspector Hornleigh Goes to It (1941) as Commissioner
- Breach of Promise (1942) as Sir Hamar
- The Day Will Dawn (1942) as Evans, Foreign Editor
- They Flew Alone (1942) as Solicitor
- The First of the Few (1942) as Mr. Higgins
- The Young Mr. Pitt (1942) as Mayor (uncredited)
- Yellow Canary (1943) as Admiral (uncredited)
- San Demetrio London (1943)
- The Hundred Pound Window (1944) as Baldwin
- Don't Take It to Heart (1944) as Sir Henry Wade, Prosecuting Counsel
- The Man from Morocco (1945) as Dr. Duboste
- I Live in Grosvenor Square (1945) as War Office Major
- They Were Sisters (1945) as Mr. Field
- The Seventh Veil (1945) as Dr. Kendall
- The Wicked Lady (1945) as Martin Worth
- The Rake's Progress (1945) as Sir John Brockley
- Gaiety George (1946) as Lord Mountsbury
- Caravan (1946) as Charles Camperdene
- The Magic Bow (1946) as Rizzi
- Men of Two Worlds (1946) as Concert Agent
- Spring Song (1946) as Sir Anthony
- The Man Within (1947) as Dr. Stanton
- Easy Money (1948) as Mr. Hessian (voice, uncredited)
- Saraband for Dead Lovers (1948) as Duke George William
- It's Hard to Be Good (1948) as Edward Beckett
- Once Upon a Dream (1949) as Registrar
- The History of Mr. Polly (1949) as Mr. Garvace
- Madeleine (1950) as Lord Justice-Clerk
- Appointment with Venus (1951) as Magistrate
- Street Corner (1953) as Judge (uncredited)
- Martin Luther (1953) as Duke Frederick
- Spaceways (1953) as Minister
- The Intruder (1953) as General
- Beau Brummell (1954) as Thurlow
- Three Cases of Murder (1955) as Sir James (segment "Lord Mountdrago")
- The Last Man to Hang? (1956) as Antony Harcombe, Q.C.
- Lust for Life (1956) as Rev. Peeters
- The Prince and the Showgirl (1957) as The Foreign Office
- The Safecracker (1958) as Herbert Fenwright
- The Sheriff of Fractured Jaw (1958) as James, His Butler
- The Devil's Disciple (1959) as Uncle William
- The Clue of the New Pin (1961) as John Tredmere
- Goodbye Again (1961) as Queen's Counsel
- Dentist on the Job (1961) as Admiral Southbound
- Nurse on Wheels (1963) as Dr. Golfrey Senior
- The Big Job (1965) as Judge
- A Flea in Her Ear (1968) as The Prosecutor
- Diamonds for Breakfast (1968) as Duke of Windemere (final film)

=== Stage ===
- Suspect (1937) as Sir Hugo Const
- Witness for the Prosecution (1953) as Sir Wilfrid Robarts QC
