= A. Hamilton Gibbs =

English-American novelist (1888–1964)

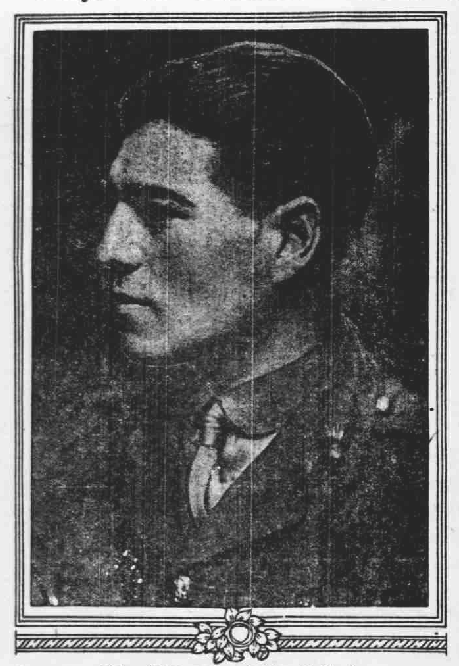
- Portrait from The Sun, 1919
- Born: 9 March 1888; London, England, UK
- Died: 24 May 1964 (aged 76); Boston. U.S.
- Occupation: Novelist

Arthur Hamilton Gibbs (9 March 1888 – 24 May 1964) was an English-American novelist. He was the brother of Cosmo Hamilton and Sir Philip Gibbs.

Born in London, Gibbs wrote 16 novels and two books of poetry. His novels include The Persistent Lovers (1915) (which was adapted into a 1922 film of the same name), Soundings (1925) (the best-selling book in the United States that year), and Chances (1930) adapted into the film Chances (1931).

Gibbs became a United States citizen in 1931, and thereafter lived primarily in Lakeville, Massachusetts. He died in Boston in 1964, survived by his wife Jeanette (Philips), a writer and lawyer.

== Works (may be incomplete) ==
- Rowlandson's Oxford (1911)
- The Compleat Oxford Man (1911)
- Cheadle and Son (1912)
- The Hour of Conflict (1914)
- The Persistent Lovers (1915)
- Gun fodder; the diary of four years of war (1919)
- The Grey Wave (1920)
- Bluebottles (1920)
- Soundings (1925)
- Labels (1926)
- Harness (1928)
- Chances (1930) (adapted for 1931 film)
- Undertow (1932)
- Rivers Glide On (1934)
- The Young Prince (1937, 60 pp.)
- A Half Inch of Candle (1939)
- Way of Life (1947)
- One Touch of France (1953) (free verse)
- Obedience to the Moon (1956)
