= Margot Drake =

English actress (1899–1948)

- Born: 11 December 1899; Deptford, London; United Kingdom
- Died: 15 May 1948 (aged 48); England
- Other name: Marjorie Alexa Thomson
- Occupation: Actress

Margot Drake (11 December 1899 – 15 May 1948) was an English stage and film actress. During the silent era she appeared in eight British films including The Wonderful Year.

== Selected filmography ==
- A Bachelor Husband (1920)
- The Breed of the Treshams (1920)
- The Headmaster (1921)
- The Wonderful Year (1921)
- The Street of Adventure (1921)

== Bibliography ==
- Low, Rachael. History of the British Film, 1918-1929. George Allen & Unwin, 1971.
