= Chances (film) =

1931 film

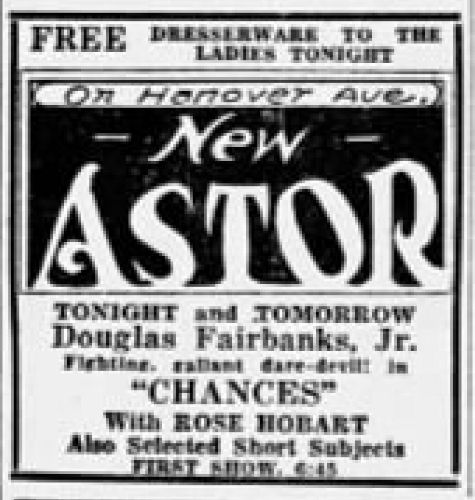
- Newspaper advertisement
- Directed by: Allan Dwan
- Written by: Waldemar Young (adaptation)
- Screenplay by: A. Hamilton Gibbs
- Based on: Chances; 1930 novel by A. Hamilton Gibbs
- Starring: Douglas Fairbanks, Jr. Rose Hobart
- Cinematography: Ernest Haller
- Edited by: Ray Curtiss
- Music by: David Mendoza; Oscar Potoker
- Production company: First National Pictures
- Distributed by: First National Pictures; Warner Bros. Pictures
- Release date: July 18, 1931
- Running time: 72 minutes
- Country: United States
- Language: English

Chances is a 1931 American pre-Code war drama film directed by Allan Dwan and starring Douglas Fairbanks, Jr. It is based on the 1930 novel by A. Hamilton Gibbs.

According to Fairbanks, the film was a hit, although in his autobiography he says it was "good, but not good enough."

== Plot ==
In 1914, brother officers Jack and Tom Ingleside are in London, headed home on furlough. In the dense fog, Jack bumps into a young woman and tries to pick her up. She laughs at him, promises they will meet again, and rides off in a cab. When the brothers arrive at the family home, their mother is having tea with Molly Prescott, a childhood neighbor who has grown to be a lovely young woman—the woman in the fog. Tom tells his mother that he has always loved Molly. Jack, who is known as a ladies' man, is smitten.

Mrs. Ingleside is holding a benefit ball for the Red Cross, and Archie, Ruth and Sylvia, friends of the boys, spend the weekend. Sylvia is Jack's old flame. Jack and Molly step away from the dance. He tries to tell her how he feels and she laughingly replies, "How many girls have you said that to?" but they kiss. She returns to the dance where Tom is waiting.

When their mother tells Jack of her joy at the love between Tom and Molly, he is shocked as he had thought that Tom was not interested in girls. Heartbroken, he has sex with Sylvia in Molly's presence. Wounded, Molly turns away. Meanwhile, they have been called to France and their artillery unit. Tom asks Molly to wait for him. Ecstatic, he tells Jack of the engagement, and Jack congratulates him.

At the front, bodies and debris fill a gun emplacement and the communicating trench. Lieutenant Taylor brings the news and dies. Jack is assigned to take a crew of volunteers to put the gun back in order, returning over the same terrain that killed Taylor. The mission is a success, but four men die.

The major sends Jack on leave. Tom gives him a letter for Molly, who does not write to him. In a French town, Jack sees Molly, who is driving for the army. She confesses she agreed to marry Tom out of anger, and she cannot write to him because she doesn't love him. She asks for one day of Jack's leave. He agrees to come back early. She promises to write to Tom and tell him the truth.

They meet as planned and visit the shore. She did not write to Tom. Jack says "Saying goodbye is to die a little." He puts a ring on her left hand. She gives him a picture. They have an hour left, perhaps their last, and she cannot bear to let him go. She curls up on the grass, weeping. They embrace passionately.

Back at the front, Jack tells Tom it was impossible to talk to their mother as there was a stone wall between them. Tom observes that the letters they send home are lies, because they can't talk to her about what is really happening at the front.

Tom takes Jack's coat by mistake and finds Molly's picture. He assumes Jack forgot to give it to him, but when he teases Jack about it, the truth emerges. Tom, furious and betrayed, refuses to listen.

Major Bradford is ordered to withdraw his artillery group. Men, teams of horses and wagons race to a new position under a constant barrage. They fire on the advancing German infantry, then remove the breech blocks and fall back to their trenches, still under constant fire. Tom lingers by the guns, apparently in despair and seemingly waiting and wanting to be killed. Calling Tom, Jack returns through barbed wire and across shattered ground to reach his brother, now wounded. He drags Tom back.

In the final scene, Jack has lost his left arm and walks with a cane. Molly steps out to meet him and they kiss. Tom has died, but Jack finds consolation in the fact that his brother said they were pals at the end. Jack and Moly walk together into the fog, after a neat little scene with the bobby telling them to put out the match Molly lit for Jack's cigarette, mirroring the opening scene where the bobby says the same thing to a newspaper seller.

== Cast ==
- Douglas Fairbanks, Jr. as Jack Ingleside
- Rose Hobart as Molly Prescott
- Anthony Bushell as Tom Ingleside
- Holmes Herbert as Major Bradford
- Mary Forbes as Mrs. Ingleside
- Edmund Breon as The General

Uncredited:

- Billy Bevan as Cuthbert, Pub Waiter
- Florence Britton as Sylvia
- David Cavendish as Bit
- Tyrell Davis as Archie
- Ethel Griffies as Drunk Flower Vendor
- Ruth Hall as Girl at Party
- Forrester Harvey as Joe, News Vendor
- Mae Madison as Ruth
- Edward Morgan as Lt. Wickham
- Jameson Thomas as Lt. Taylor

== Reception ==
In a contemporary review for The New York Times, critic Mordaunt Hall wrote: "It is a thoroughly human story of war and love, taken from A. Hamilton Gibbs's novel. It rings true in every episode, nothing being overdone, for which Alan Dwan, the director, deserves much credit. The fighting scenes are vividly produced and the romance is etched splendidly. ... This picture is a glowing example of the value of adhering to an author's story. The fact that it has not been tampered with unduly is the reason for its compelling quality, for no silly scenario tricks are permitted to interrupt the flow of events. Mr. Dwan unfurls his tale with commendable restraint, giving through the turning of railroad coach wheels, those of an automobile or those of a motorcycle, a definite conception of the passage of time."

== Preservation status ==
The film has been preserved at the Library of Congress.
