= Philip Gibbs =

English journalist and novelist (1877–1962)

Sir Philip Gibbs KBE
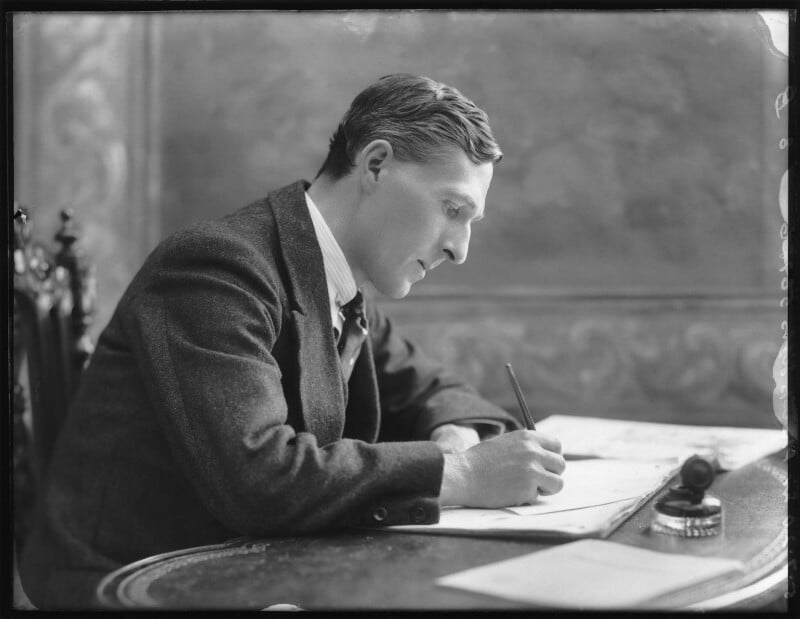
- Gibbs (1920)
- Born: Philip Armand Thomas Hamilton Gibbs; 1 May 1877; London, England, UK
- Died: 10 March 1962 (aged 84); Godalming, Surrey, UK
- Occupations: Journalist, novelist, memoirist
- Relatives: A. Hamilton Gibbs (brother); Cosmo Hamilton (brother)
- Writing career
- Period: 1899–1957

Sir Philip Armand Thomas Hamilton Gibbs KBE, Chevalier of the Legion of Honour (1 May 1877 – 10 March 1962) was an English journalist and author who served as one of five official British war correspondents during the First World War.

== Early life ==
The son of a civil servant, Gibbs was born in Kensington, London. He received a home education and determined at an early age to become a writer. Four of his siblings were also writers: A. Hamilton Gibbs, Francis Hamilton Gibbs, Helen Hamilton Gibbs and Cosmo Hamilton, as was his father Henry James Gibbs and his son, Anthony. Gibbs was a Roman Catholic.

== Career ==
His first article was published in 1894 in the Daily Chronicle; five years later he published the first of many books, Founders of the Empire. He was given the post of literary editor at Alfred Harmsworth's leading (and growing) tabloid format newspaper the Daily Mail. He subsequently worked on other prominent newspapers including the Daily Express.

The Times, in 1940 referring to 1909, credited Gibbs with "bursting the bubble with one cable to the London newspaper he was representing". The bubble in question was the September 1909 claim by American explorer Frederick Cook to have reached the North Pole in April 1908. Gibbs didn't trust Cook's "romantic" impressions of his journey into the ice.

His first attempt at semi-fiction was published in 1909 as The Street of Adventure, which recounted the story of the official Liberal Party newspaper Tribune, founded in 1906 and failing spectacularly in 1908. The paper was founded at vast expense by Franklin Thomasson, MP for Leicester from 1906 to 1910. A man of decidedly liberal views, Gibbs took an interest in popular movements of the time, including the suffragettes, publishing a book on the British women's suffrage movement in 1910. With tensions growing in Europe in the years immediately preceding 1914, Gibbs repeatedly expressed a belief that war could be avoided between the Entente and Central Powers.

As one of five official war correspondents, Gibbs wrote about the Mines in the Battle of Messines (1917):

Suddenly at dawn, as a signal for all of our guns to open fire, there rose out of the dark ridge of Messines and 'Whitesheet' and that ill-famed Hill 60, enormous volumes of scarlet flame from nineteen separate mines throwing up high towers of earth and smoke all lighted by the flame, spilling over into fountains of fierce colour, so that many of our soldiers waiting for the assault were thrown to the ground. The German troops were stunned, dazed and horror-stricken if they were not killed outright. Many of them lay dead in the great craters opened by the mines.

— Philip Gibbs

Gibbs' work appeared in the Daily Telegraph and Daily Chronicle. The price he had to pay for accreditation was to submit to effective censorship: all of his work was to be vetted by C. E. Montague, formerly of the Manchester Guardian. He agreed, although unhappy with the arrangement. Gibbs' wartime output was prodigious. He produced a stream of newspaper articles and a series of books: The Soul of the War (1915), The Battle of the Somme (1917), From Bapaume to Passchendaele (1918) and The Realities of War (UK title, 1920; "Now it Can Be Told", United States title, 1920). Gibbs' work in the immediate post-war period was focused on a fear of societal unrest created by brutalised ‘ape-men’ and wartime-employed women who 'were clinging onto their jobs, would not let go of the pocket-money which they had spent on frocks’. He was appointed KBE in the 1920 civilian war honours. The same year he was made a Chevalier of the Legion of Honour by the French government.

In The Realities of War Gibbs exacted a form of revenge for the frustration he suffered in submitting to wartime censorship; published after the armistice, the book gave an account of his personal experiences in war-torn Europe, painting a most unflattering portrait of Sir Douglas Haig, British Commander-in-Chief in France and Flanders, and his General Headquarters.

Working as a freelance journalist, having resigned from the Daily Chronicle over its support for the Lloyd George government's Irish policy, he published a series of books and articles. These included the introduction to Ireland in Insurrection about recent English atrocities in that country and an autobiography, Adventures in Journalism (1923).

Gibbs' 1937 book Ordeal In England was a study of poverty and also an anti-socialist critique of English Journey by J. B. Priestley and The Road to Wigan Pier by George Orwell. Ordeal In England was later republished by the conservative Right Book Club.

The outbreak of the Second World War in 1939 brought Gibbs a renewed appointment as a war correspondent, this time for the Daily Sketch. This proved a brief stint, however, and he spent part of the war employed by the Ministry of Information, the department responsible for publicity and propaganda, which the British government re-established in September 1939. In 1946 he published a second volume of memoirs, The Pageant of the Years. Two further volumes followed in 1949 and 1957, Crowded Company and Life's Adventure.

== Death ==
Gibbs died in Godalming, Surrey, on 10 March 1962.

== Works ==
A list of books by Gibbs.

- Across the Frontiers. 1937.
- Adventures In Journalism. 1923.
- America Speaks
- An Historical Account Of Compendious and Swift Writing
- Back To Life. 1920.
- Australasia: The Britains of the South, 1903.
- Beauty and Nick, 1921.
- Behind the Curtain
- Blood Relations, 1935.
- Both Your Houses
- Bridging the Atlantic.
- Broken Pledges, 1938.
- Called Back
- Cities Of Refuge
- Crowded Company
- Darkened Rooms, 1930.
- England Speaks, 1935.
- European Journey
- Facts and Ideas: Short Studies Of Life and Literature, 1905.
- Founders Of the Empire
- From Bapaume To Passchendaele On the Western Front 1917. 1918.
- Great Argument
- Heirs Apparent, 1924
- How Now England
- Knowledge Is Power
- Lady Of the Yellow River
- Life's Adventure
- Men and Women Of the French Revolution. 1906.
- More That Must Be Told.
- No Price For Freedom
- Now It Can Be Told. 1920.
- Oil Lamps and Candlelight
- Oliver's Kind Women, 1929.
- Ordeal In England
- People Of Destiny, 1920.
- Realities Of War. 1920.
- Since Then, 1930.
- Sons Of the Others
- Ten Years After: A Reminder, 1925.
- The Age Of Reason, 1930.
- The Anxious Days
- The Balkan War. 1913.
- The Battle Within
- The Battles Of the Somme. 1917.
- The Cloud Above the Green
- The Cross Of Peace
- The Curtains Of Yesterday
- The Custody of the Child
- The Day After To-Morrow
- The Eighth Year: A Vital Problem of Married Life, 1913.
- The Germans On the Somme
- The Golden Years
- The Healing Touch
- The Hidden City, 1930.
- The Hope Of Europe
- The Hopeful Heart
- The Individualist
- The Interpreter
- The Journalist's London
- The Law-Breakers
- The Life and Times Of King George V: George the Faithful
- The Long Alert
- The Middle Of the Road. 1923.
- The Pageant Of the Years, 1946.
- The Pilgrim's Progress To Culture
- The Reckless Duke
- The Reckless Lady, 1925.
- The Riddle Of a Changing World
- The Romance Of Empire
- The Romance Of George Villiers. 1908.
- The Soul Of the War. 1916.
- The Spoils Of Time
- The Street Of Adventure. 1920.
- The Struggle In Flanders On the Western Front 1917. New York, George H. Doran Company. 1919.
- The Troubadour. 1900.
- The Way To Victory. New York, George H. Doran company. 1919.
- The Winding Lane
- The Wonders of the World
- Thine Enemy
- This Nettle Danger
- Through the Storm
- Unchanging Quest, 1926.
- Venetian Lovers and Other Stories, 1930.
- Wounded Souls
- Young Anarchy, 1926.

== Film adaptations ==
Several of his books were adapted as movies.

- 1921, The Street of Adventure
- 1925, Venetian Lovers
- 1925, The City of Temptation
- 1926, High Steppers, based on the novel Heirs Apparent
- 1926, The Reckless Lady
- 1928, Paradise, based on The Crossword Puzzle
- 1928, Out of the Ruins
- 1929, Darkened Rooms
- 1933, Captured!, based on the story "Fellow Prisoners"
