= The Clue of the New Pin (1961 film) =

British film by Allan Davis

- Directed by: Allan Davis
- Written by: Philip Mackie
- Based on: the novel by Edgar Wallace
- Produced by: Jack Greenwood
- Starring: Paul Daneman; Bernard Archard; James Villiers
- Cinematography: Bert Mason
- Edited by: Anne Barker
- Music by: Ron Goodwin (uncredited)
- Production company: Merton Park Studios
- Distributed by: Anglo-Amalgamated Film Distributors (UK)
- Release date: 1961
- Running time: 58 mins
- Country: United Kingdom
- Language: English

The Clue of the New Pin is a 1961 British second feature ('B') crime film directed by Allan Davis and starring Paul Daneman, Bernard Archard and James Villiers. The screenplay was by Philip Mackie, based on the 1923 Edgar Wallace novel of the same title which was previously filmed in 1929. It is part of the series of Edgar Wallace Mysteries films made at Merton Park Studios from 1960 to 1965.

== Plot ==
TV journalist Tab Holland assists Scotland yard with the murder of a reclusive millionaire whose corpse is discovered locked in a vault. The key to the vault is mysteriously found on the table beside the corpse.

== Partial cast ==
- Paul Daneman as Rex Lander
- Bernard Archard as Superintendent Carver
- James Villiers as Tab Holland
- Katherine Woodville as Jane Ardfern
- Clive Morton as Ramsey Brown
- Leslie Sands as Sergeant Harris
- David Horne as John Trasmere
- Ruth Kettlewell as Mrs Rushby
- Wolfe Morris as Yeh Ling
- Maudie Edwards as barmaid

== Critical reception ==
The Monthly Film Bulletin wrote: "A listless attempt is made to bring this old-fashioned Edgar Wallace thriller up-to-date by introducing a television announcer, contemporary furniture and nylon thread. Played in period, the heavy-handed melodrama might have seemed more convincing. As it is, with its Chinese manservant, vaulted treasure and fortune made "out East" (to say nothing of the footling trick with key and pin on which the plot revolves), it is merely an unlikely oddity among second feature thrillers."

TV Guide called it "slightly better than most of the 47 Edgar Wallace second features that producer Greenwood put out between 1960 and 1963."
