= The Clue of the New Pin (novel) =

Book by Edgar Wallace

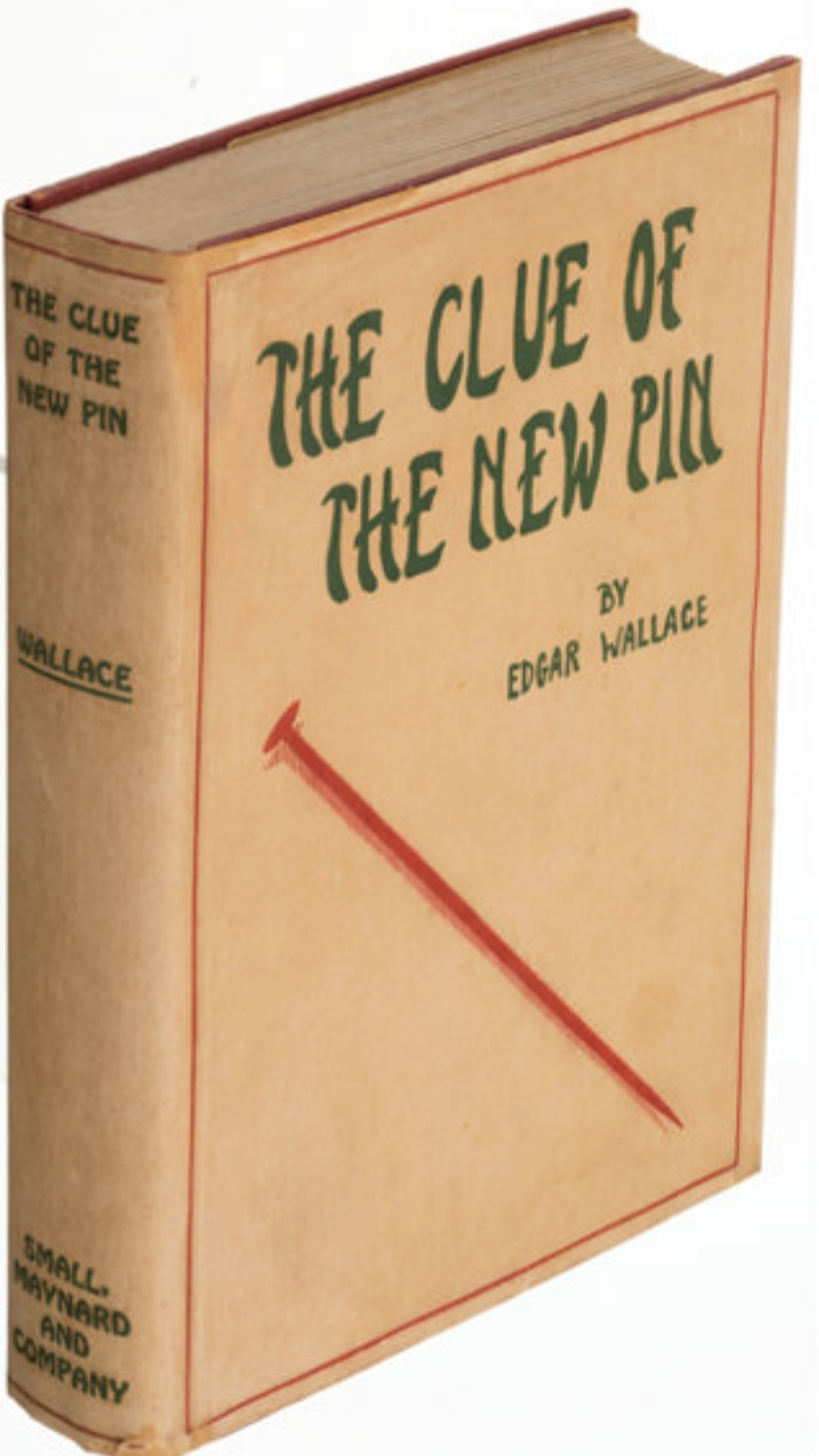
U.S. first edition, Small, Maynard and Company, 1923

The Clue of the New Pin is a 1923 crime novel by the British writer Edgar Wallace. it was first published by Hodder & Stoughton in London, 1923.

== Adaptations ==
The novel has been adapted for the cinema three times:

- The Clue of the New Pin (1929) directed by Arthur Maude. This film was filmed in British Phototone, a sound-on-disc system using 12-inch discs. In March 1929, Pin was trade-shown with The Crimson Circle made in the Phonofilm sound-on-film process.
- The Clue of the New Pin (1961) directed by Allan Davis.
- What Have You Done to Solange? (1972) directed by Massimo Dallamano, is an Italian Giallo thriller loosely based on the novel.

== Plot ==
Jesse Trasmere is a penny-pincher who doesn't trust banks, therefore he keeps his money in his house. His nephew Rex Lander received an allowance from his uncle, which he finds too short to keep his extravagant life style. Trasmere decided to go out of town to avoid an unwanted situation, but his body was suspiciously found days later in a locked vault.
