= Gordon Craig (actor) =

British actor

Gordon Craig was a British actor.

== Selected filmography ==
- Consequences (1918)
- The Double Life of Mr. Alfred Burton (1919)
- The Breed of the Treshams (1920)
- Uncle Dick's Darling (1920)
- A Bachelor Husband (1920)
- Christie Johnstone (1921)
- The Door That Has No Key (1921)
- The Headmaster (1921)
- The Glorious Adventure (1922)
- Miriam Rozella (1924)
- Dawn (1928)
- Take a Powder (1953)
