= The Clue of the New Pin (1929 film) =

1929 film by Arthur Maude

- Directed by: Arthur Maude
- Written by: Edgar Wallace (novel); Kathleen Hayden
- Produced by: S.W. Smith
- Starring: Benita Hume; Kim Peacock; Donald Calthrop; John Gielgud
- Cinematography: Horace Wheddon
- Production company: British Lion Film Corporation
- Distributed by: Producers Distributing Corporation
- Release date: March 1929
- Running time: 7,292 feet
- Country: United Kingdom
- Languages: Sound (All-Talking); English

The Clue of the New Pin is a 1929 all-talking sound British crime film directed by Arthur Maude and starring Benita Hume, Kim Peacock, and Donald Calthrop. The soundtrack was recorded using the British Phototone sound-on-disc system. It was made at Beaconsfield Studios. This film is important historically as being Britain's first all-talking feature film produced entirely in Britain. The first all-talking British feature production, a film entitled Black Waters, had been produced in the United States due to a lack of sound recording equipment in Britain.

The film was one of only 10 filmed in British Phototone, a sound-on-disc system which used 12-inch discs. All of the other nine films made in this process were short films. In March 1929, this film and The Crimson Circle, filmed in the De Forest Phonofilm sound-on-film system, were 'trade-shown' to cinema exhibitors.

This film is an adaptation of the 1923 novel The Clue of the New Pin by Edgar Wallace. It was later remade in 1961.

== Plot ==
A wealthy recluse is murdered in an absolutely sealed room.

== Cast ==
- Benita Hume as Ursula Ardfern
- Kim Peacock as Tab Holland
- Donald Calthrop as Yeh Ling
- John Gielgud as Rex Trasmere
- Harold Saxon-Snell as Walters
- Johnny Butt as Wellington Briggs
- Colin Kenny as Inspector Carver

== See also ==
- List of early sound feature films (1926–1929)

== Bibliography ==
- Low, Rachael. History of the British Film, 1918-1929. George Allen & Unwin, 1971.
