= Hard Times (novel) =

1854 novel by Charles Dickens

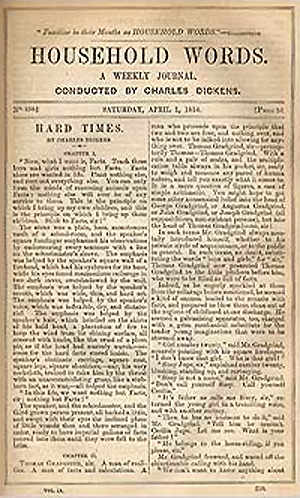
- Title page of the serial in Household Words, April 1854
- Author: Charles Dickens
- Original title: Hard Times: For These Times
- Language: English
- Genre: Novel
- Published: Serialised April 1854 – 12 August 1854; book format 1854
- Publisher: Bradbury & Evans
- Publication place: England
- Media type: Print
- Preceded by: A Child's History of England
- Followed by: Little Dorrit

Hard Times: For These Times (commonly known as Hard Times) is the tenth novel by English author Charles Dickens, first published in 1854. The book surveys English society and satirises its social and economic conditions.

Hard Times is unusual in several ways. It is by far the shortest of Dickens's novels, barely a quarter of the length of those written immediately before and after it. Also, unlike all but one of his other novels, Hard Times has neither a preface nor illustrations. Moreover, it is his only novel without scenes set in London. Instead, the story is set in the fictitious Victorian industrial town of Coketown, a generic Northern English mill town, in some ways similar to Manchester, though smaller. Coketown may be partially based on 19th-century Preston.

One of Dickens's reasons for writing Hard Times was that sales of his weekly periodical Household Words were low, and it was hoped the novel's publication in installments would boost circulation – as indeed proved to be the case. Since its publication, it has received a mixed response from critics. Critics such as George Bernard Shaw and Thomas Macaulay have mainly focused on Dickens's treatment of trade unions and his post-Industrial Revolution pessimism regarding the divide between capitalist mill owners and undervalued workers during the Victorian era. F. R. Leavis, a great admirer of the book, included it – but not Dickens's work as a whole – as part of his Great Tradition of English novels.

== Publication ==
The novel was published as a serial in Dickens's weekly publication, Household Words. Sales were highly responsive and encouraging for Dickens, who remarked that he was "Three parts mad, and the fourth delirious, with perpetual rushing at Hard Times". The novel was serialised, in twenty weekly parts, between 1 April and 12 August 1854. It sold well, and a complete volume was published in August, totalling 110,000 words. Another related novel, North and South by Elizabeth Gaskell, was also published in this magazine.

Date of publication	Chapters	Book (from the novelisation)
1 April 1854	1–3	Book I
8 April 1854	4–5
15 April 1854	6
22 April 1854	7–8
29 April 1854	9–10
6 May 1854	11–12
13 May 1854	13–14
20 May 1854	15–16
27 May 1854	17	Book II
3 June 1854	18–19
10 June 1854	20–21
17 June 1854	22
24 June 1854	23
1 July 1854	24
8 July 1854	25–26
15 July 1854	27–28
22 July 1854	29–30	Book III
29 July 1854	31–32
5 August 1854	33–34
12 August 1854	35–37

== Synopsis ==
The novel follows a classical tripartite structure, and the titles of each book are related to Galatians 6:7, "For whatsoever a man soweth, that shall he also reap." Book I is entitled "Sowing", Book II is entitled "Reaping", and Book III is "Garnering."

=== Book 1: Sowing ===
Superintendent Mr. Thomas Gradgrind opens the novel at his school in Coketown, stating, "Now, what I want is Facts. Teach these boys and girls nothing but Facts", and interrogates one of his pupils, Cecilia (nicknamed Sissy), whose father works at a circus. Because her father works with horses, Gradgrind demands the definition of a horse. When she is scolded for her inability to define a horse factually, her classmate Bitzer gives a zoological profile, and Sissy is censured for suggesting that she would carpet a floor with pictures of flowers or horses.

Louisa and Thomas, two of Mr. Gradgrind's children, go after school to see the touring circus run by Mr. Sleary, only to meet their father, who orders them home. Mr. Gradgrind has three younger children: Adam Smith (after the famous theorist of laissez-faire policy), Malthus (after Rev. Thomas Malthus, who wrote An Essay on the Principle of Population, warning of the dangers of future overpopulation), and Jane.

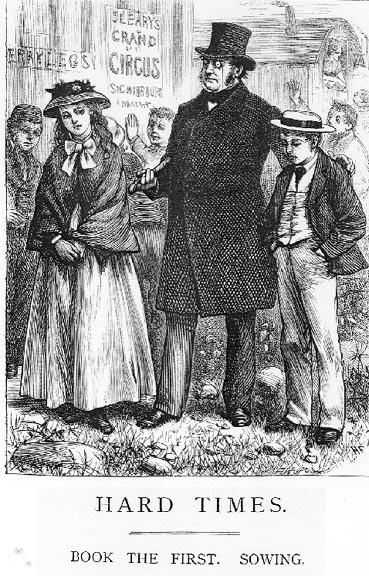
Gradgrind apprehends Louisa and Tom, his two eldest children, caught peeping at the circus.

Josiah Bounderby, "a man perfectly devoid of sentiment", is revealed as Gradgrind's close friend. Bounderby is a manufacturer and mill owner who is affluent as a result of his entrepreneurial activities and capital. He often gives dramatic, fabricated accounts of his childhood.

As they consider her a bad influence on the other children, Gradgrind and Bounderby prepare to dismiss Sissy from the school, but the two soon discover her father has abandoned her there, in the hope that she will lead a better life without him. Mr. Gradgrind gives Sissy a choice: to return to the circus and its kindly manager, Mr. Sleary, and forfeit her education, or to continue her education and work for Mrs. Gradgrind, never returning to the circus. Sissy accepts the latter, hoping to be reunited with her father. At the Gradgrind house, Tom and Louisa befriend Sissy, but they are all discontent with their strict upbringing.

Amongst the mill workers, known as "the Hands", is a gloomy man named Stephen Blackpool (nicknamed "Old Stephen"): another of the story's protagonists. When introduced, he ended his day's work and met his close friend Rachael. On entering his house, he finds that his drunken wife, who has been living away from him, has made an unwelcome return. Stephen is greatly perturbed and visits Bounderby to ask how he can legally end his marriage and marry Rachael. Mrs. Sparsit, Mr. Bounderby's housekeeper, disapproves of Stephen's query, and Bounderby explains that ending a marriage would be complex and prohibitively costly. When Stephen points out the injustice of this, Bounderby accuses him of having ideas above his station. Leaving the house, Stephen meets an older woman who seems interested in Bounderby and says she visits Coketown once a year. Upon returning, he finds Rachael caring for his wife, and stays until three o'clock. When Rachael falls asleep, Mrs. Blackpool wakes up and mistakes a bottle of medicine for alcohol. Despite knowing that she will die if she drinks the entire bottle, Stephen does not move to stop her. Rachael wakes and prevents Mrs. Blackpool from poisoning herself, and Stephen, horrified by his lack of action, finds strength and resolve to bear his suffering.

Several years pass. Sissy becomes Gradgrind's housekeeper, caring for his younger children. Gradgrind tells Louisa that Josiah Bounderby, 30 years her senior, has proposed marriage to her, and quotes statistics to prove that an age difference does not make a marriage unhappy or short. Louisa passively accepts the offer, and the newlyweds set out to Lyons (Lyon), where Bounderby wants to observe how labour is used in the factories there. Tom, her brother, bids her a joyful farewell.

=== Book 2: Reaping ===
Book Two opens on Bounderby's bank in Coketown, over which the "light porter", Sissy's old classmate Bitzer, and the austere Mrs. Sparsit keep watch in the afternoon. A well-dressed gentleman asks for directions to Bounderby's house, as Gradgrind has sent him from London with a letter of introduction. It is James Harthouse, who has tried several occupations and been bored by all of them.

Harthouse is introduced to Bounderby, who accepts him and then regales him with brief, improbable mentions of his childhood. Harthouse is utterly bored by him, but enamoured of the now-melancholy Louisa. Louisa's brother Tom works for Bounderby and has become reckless and wayward in his conduct. Tom admires Harthouse, who holds him in some contempt, and Tom discloses contempt for Bounderby in the presence of Harthouse, who notes Louisa's affection for Tom and later learns that Tom has money problems – and that Tom persuaded Louisa to marry Bounderby to make his own life easier.

At a crowded union meeting, the agitator Slackbridge accuses Stephen Blackpool of treachery because he will not join the union, and Stephen learns he is to be 'sent to Coventry' – shunned by all his fellow workers. Summoned by Bounderby, he is asked what the men are complaining of, and when Stephen tries to explain, Bounderby accuses Stephen of being a troublemaker and sacks him. Later, Louisa and Tom visit Stephen, expressing regret, and Louisa gives him some money. Privately, Tom tells him to wait outside the bank after work.

When a robbery takes place at the bank, Stephen is suspected of the crime; even more so as he had left the town the next day. Mrs. Sparsit observes the advancing relationship between James Harthouse and Louisa and suspects an adulterous liaison. Unable to hear their dialogue, she assumes the affair is progressing. When Harthouse confesses his love for Louisa, Louisa refuses him. They leave separately, and Mrs. Sparsit follows Louisa to the station, where Louisa boards a train to her father's house; Mrs. Sparsit loses her. When Louisa arrives, she is in an extreme state of distress. Having argued that her rigorous education has stifled her ability to express her emotions, Louisa collapses at her father's feet in a dead faint.

=== Book 3: Garnering ===
At Bounderby's London hotel, Mrs. Sparsit gives him the news her surveillance has brought. Bounderby takes her back to Coketown and to Stone Lodge, where Louisa is resting. Gradgrind tells Bounderby that Louisa resisted Harthouse's advances, but has experienced a crisis and needs time to recover. Bounderby is immensely indignant and ill-mannered, especially towards Mrs. Sparsit for misleading him. Ignoring Gradgrind's pleas, he announces that unless Louisa returns to him the next day, the marriage will end. She does not come back.

Harthouse leaves Coketown after Sissy tells him never to return. As Slackbridge increasingly blackens Stephen Blackpool's name, Rachael goes to the bank to tell them she knows where he is and that she will write to him, asking him to return to Coketown to clear his name. Bounderby is suspicious when she tells him Stephen was visited by Louisa and Tom the night he was dismissed, and brings her to Gradgrind's house, where Louisa confirms Rachael's account.

Mrs. Sparsit eventually tracks down Mrs. Pegler, the older woman who makes a mysterious annual visit to see Bounderby's house, and brings her to the house where she is revealed as Bounderby's mother. Far from having abandoned him to a life of hardship, she gave him a good upbringing and, when he became successful, allowed herself to be persuaded never to visit him. Bounderby is now publicly exposed as a ridiculous humbug 'bully of humility'.

On a Sunday outing, Rachael and Sissy find Stephen, who has fallen down an abandoned pit shaft while walking back to Coketown. Villagers rescue him, but after professing his innocence and speaking to Rachael for the last time, he dies. Louisa and Sissy now suspect that Tom has committed the bank robbery, and they simply told Stephen to loiter outside the bank to incriminate him. Sissy has already helped Tom escape by sending him to join Mr. Sleary's circus. Louisa and Sissy find Tom there, disguised in blackface. Gradgrind arrives and despairs, and a plan is hatched with Sleary's co-operation to get Tom to Liverpool, where he can escape abroad. The plan is temporarily foiled by Bitzer's arrival, who hopes to secure promotion from Bounderby by bringing Tom to justice. However, Sleary arranges an ambush, and Tom is taken to Liverpool, where he boards a ship.

Bounderby punishes Mrs. Sparsit for his humiliation by turning her out. Five years later, he will die of a fit in the street, while Mr. Gradgrind, having abandoned his Utilitarian ideas and trying to make Facts "subservient to Faith, Hope and Charity", will suffer the contempt of his fellow MPs. Rachael will continue her life of honest, hard work, while Mr. Gradgrind will pardon Stephen Blackpool. Tom will die from fever near Coketown, having expressed penitence in a tear-stained letter. Louisa herself will grow old, but will never remarry and have children of her own. Louisa, showing kindness to the less fortunate and being loved by Sissy's children, will spend her life encouraging imagination and fancy in all she encounters.

== Characters ==
=== Mr. Gradgrind ===
Thomas Gradgrind is the notorious school board Superintendent, who is dedicated to the pursuit of profitable enterprise. His name is now used generically to refer to someone hard and only concerned with cold facts and numbers, a follower of Utilitarian ideas who neglects the imagination. He sees the error of these beliefs, however, when his children's lives fall into disarray.

=== Mr. Bounderby ===
Josiah Bounderby is a business associate of Mr. Gradgrind. Given to boasting about being a self-made man, he employs many of the novel's other central characters. He has risen to a position of power and wealth from humble origins (though not as humble as he claims). He marries Mr. Gradgrind's daughter, Louisa, some 30 years his junior, in what turns out to be a loveless marriage. They have no children. Bounderby is callous, self-centred, and ultimately revealed to be a liar and a fraud.

=== Louisa ===
Louisa (Loo) Gradgrind (later Louisa Bounderby) is the eldest child of the Gradgrind family. She has been taught to suppress her feelings and finds it hard to express herself clearly, saying as a child that she has "unmanageable thoughts." After her unhappy marriage, she is tempted to adultery by James Harthouse, but resists him and returns to her father. Her rejection of Harthouse leads to a new understanding of life and of the value of emotions and the imagination. She reproaches her father for his dry and fact-based approach to the world and convinces him of the error of his ways.

=== Sissy Jupe ===
Cecilia (Sissy) Jupe is a circus girl of Sleary's circus, as well as a student of Gradgrind's. Sissy has her own set of values and beliefs, which make her seem unintelligent in the Gradgrind household. At the end of the novel, when the Gradgrinds' philosophy of religiously adhering solely to facts breaks down, Sissy is the character who teaches them how to live.

She struggles to keep up with Gradgrind's extreme reliance on the recitation of facts and is therefore seen as unworthy of the school. Sissy is also representative of creativity and wonderment because of her circus background, which the Gradgrind children were not allowed to engage in. At Josiah Bounderby's urging, Mr. Gradgrind goes to inform Sissy's father that she can no longer attend his school.

While Sissy and her father were once very close, Mr. Jupe abandoned his daughter. In a moment of compassion, Mr. Gradgrind takes Sissy into his home and gives her a second chance at the school. Sissy continues to fall behind in school, so Mr. Gradgrind keeps her at home to tend to his invalid wife.

While Sissy is the device of imagination and fantasy in the novel, she also serves as the voice of reason. She cannot grasp the philosophy of Gradgrind's classroom because she has a more realistic view of how the world should be perceived. After Louisa and Mr. Gradgrind come to terms with the fact that their way of life is not working, Sissy is the one they come to; she takes care of Louisa and helps her live a new, happy life.

=== Tom ===
Thomas (Tom) Gradgrind, Junior is the oldest son and second child of the Gradgrinds. Initially sullen and resentful of his father's Utilitarian education, Tom has a strong relationship with his sister, Louisa. He works in Bounderby's bank (which he later robs), and turns to gambling and drinking. Louisa never ceases to adore Tom, and she helps Sissy and Mr. Gradgrind save her brother from arrest.

=== Stephen Blackpool ===
Stephen Blackpool is a worker at one of Bounderby's mills. He has a drunken wife who no longer lives with him but who appears from time to time. He forms a close bond with Rachael, a coworker, whom he wishes to marry. After a dispute with Bounderby, he is dismissed from his job at the Coketown mills and, shunned by his former coworkers, is forced to look for work elsewhere. While absent from Coketown, he is wrongly accused of robbing Bounderby's bank. On his way back to vindicate himself, he falls down a mine-shaft. He is rescued but dies of his injuries.

=== Other characters ===
Bitzer
A very pale classmate of Sissy's who is brought up on facts and taught to operate according to self-interest. He takes a job at Bounderby's bank and later tries to arrest Tom.
Rachael
A friend of Stephen Blackpool who attests to Stephen's innocence when Tom accuses him of robbing Bounderby's bank. She is a factory worker, childhood friend of Blackpool's drunken and often absent wife, and becomes the literary tool for bringing the two parallel story lines together at the brink of Hell's Shaft in the final book.
Mrs. Sparsit
A widow who has fallen on hard times. She is employed by Bounderby and is jealous when he marries Louisa, delighting in the belief that Louisa is about to elope with James Harthouse. Her machinations are unsuccessful, and Bounderby ultimately sacks her.
James Harthouse
An indolent, languid, upper-class gentleman, who attempts to woo Louisa.
Mrs Gradgrind
The wife of Mr Gradgrind, an invalid who constantly complains. Tom Sr.'s apparent attraction to her stems from her total lack of 'fancy', though she also appears unintelligent and without empathy for her children.
Mr Sleary
The owner of the circus which employs Sissy's father. He speaks with a lisp. A kind man, he helps both Sissy and young Tom when they are in trouble.
Mrs Pegler
An old woman who sometimes visits Coketown to observe the Bounderby estate. She is later revealed to be Bounderby's mother, proving his "rags-to-riches" story to be fraudulent.
Jane Gradgrind
A younger sister of Tom and Louisa Gradgrind who spends a lot of time with Sissy Jupe. She is cheerful, affectionate, and, despite looking similar to Louisa, in personality, she is the opposite.

== Major themes ==
Dickens wished to educate readers about the working conditions in some factories in the industrial towns of Manchester and Preston, to "strike the heaviest blow in my power", and to dispute the assumption that prosperity runs parallel to morality. This notion he systematically deconstructed through his portrayal of the moral monsters Mr. Bounderby and James Harthouse. Dickens also believed in the importance of the imagination and that people's lives should not be reduced to a collection of material facts and statistics. The description of the circus, which he describes as caring so "little for Plain Fact", is an example of this.

=== Utilitarianism ===
The Utilitarians were one of the targets of Dickens's satire. Utilitarianism was a prevalent school of thought during this period, its founders being Jeremy Bentham and James Mill, father to political theorist John Stuart Mill. Bentham's former secretary, Edwin Chadwick, helped design the Poor Law of 1834, which deliberately made workhouse life as uncomfortable as possible. In the novel, this attitude is conveyed in Bitzer's response to Gradgrind's appeal for compassion.

Dickens was appalled by what he saw as a selfish philosophy, combined with materialist laissez-faire capitalism, in the education of some children at the time, as well as in industrial practices. In Dickens's interpretation, the prevalence of utilitarian values in educational institutions fostered contempt between mill owners and workers, leaving young adults whose imaginations had been neglected due to an overemphasis on facts at the expense of more imaginative pursuits.

Dickens wished to satirise radical Utilitarians whom he described in a letter to Charles Knight as "see[ing] figures and averages, and nothing else." He also wished to campaign for reform of working conditions. Dickens had visited factories in Manchester as early as 1839, and was appalled by the environment in which workers toiled. Drawing upon his own childhood experiences, Dickens resolved to "strike the heaviest blow in my power" for those who laboured in horrific conditions.

John Stuart Mill had a rigorous education similar to that of Louisa Gradgrind, consisting of analytical, logical, mathematical, and statistical exercises. In his twenties, Mill had a nervous breakdown, believing his capacity for emotion had been undermined by his father's stringent emphasis on analysis and mathematics in his education. In the book, Louisa herself follows a parallel course, being unable to express herself and falling into a temporary depression as a result of her anti-sentimental education.

=== Fact vs. Fancy ===
The bastion of fact is the eminently practical Mr. Gradgrind, and his model school, which teaches nothing but "Facts". Any imaginative or aesthetic subjects are absent from the curriculum, and analysis, deduction, and mathematics are emphasised. Fancy, the opposite of Fact, is epitomised by Sleary's circus. Sleary is reckoned a fool by Gradgrind and Bounderby, but it is Sleary who understands that people must be amused. Sissy, the circus performer's daughter, does badly at school, failing to remember the many facts she is taught, but is genuinely virtuous and fulfilled. Gradgrind's own son, Tom, revolts against his upbringing and becomes a gambler and a thief, while Louisa becomes emotionally stunted, virtually soulless both as a young child and as an unhappily married woman. Bitzer, who adheres to Gradgrind's teachings, becomes an uncompassionate egotist.

=== Officiousness and spying ===
Mr. Bounderby spends his whole time fabricating stories about his childhood, covering up the real nature of his upbringing, which is revealed at the end of the novel. While not a snooper himself, he is undone when Sparsit, unwittingly, reveals the mysterious older woman to be his own mother, and she unravels Josiah's secrets about his upbringing and fictitious stories. Mr. Bounderby himself superintends affairs through calculating tabular statements and statistics, and is always secretly rebuking the people of Coketown for indulging in conceit. This gives Bounderby a sense of superiority, as it does with Mrs. Sparsit, who prides herself on her salacious knowledge gained from spying on others. Bounderby's grasp for superiority is seen in his comments to Blackpool about divorce proceedings and a union movement at his factory, accusing him of wanting 'to feast on turtle soup and venison, served with a golden spoon.' All "superintendents" of the novel are undone in one way or another.

=== Morality ===
Dickens portrays the wealthy in this novel as morally corrupt. Bounderby has no moral scruples, and, for example, fires Blackpool "for a novelty". He also conducts himself without any shred of decency, frequently losing his temper. He is cynically false about his childhood. Harthouse, a leisured gentleman, is compared to an "iceberg" who will cause a wreck unwittingly, due to being "not a moral sort of fellow", as he states himself. In contrast, Stephen Blackpool, a destitute worker, is utterly moral, always abiding by his promises, and always thoughtful and considerate of others, as is Sissy Jupe.

==== The role of status on morality ====
Dickens is concerned throughout Hard Times with the effects of social class on individuals' morality. Some contrasting characters relating to this theme are Stephen and Rachael, and Tom and Mr. Bounderby. Stephen's honesty and Rachael's compassion are qualities not found among people of a higher class, but only among hard-working individuals browbeaten by the uncaring factory owners such as Bounderby. These qualities recur as Stephen works hard every day until he decides to leave town to save the names of his fellow workers, and Rachael supports Stephen through this while struggling to provide for herself. In contrast, Mr. Bounderby refuses to recognise the difficulties faced by those in lower classes, completely denying Stephen's request for help and denigrating it. Other aristocratic characters carry out blatantly immoral actions, such as Tom throwing away his sister's money, falling into debt, then robbing a bank and framing someone else for it. He admits his crimes only when evidence points clearly toward him. On the contrary, when the rumor comes out that Stephen robbed the bank, Stephen immediately heads back to Coketown to clear his name. The stark difference in morality between characters of dissimilar social status suggests Dickens's idea that there is an innate natural law that may remain unhampered in those leading less titled lives. Stephen's concept of right and wrong is untainted by the manufactured values of utilitarianism instilled into Tom and Bounderby.

== Literary significance and criticism ==
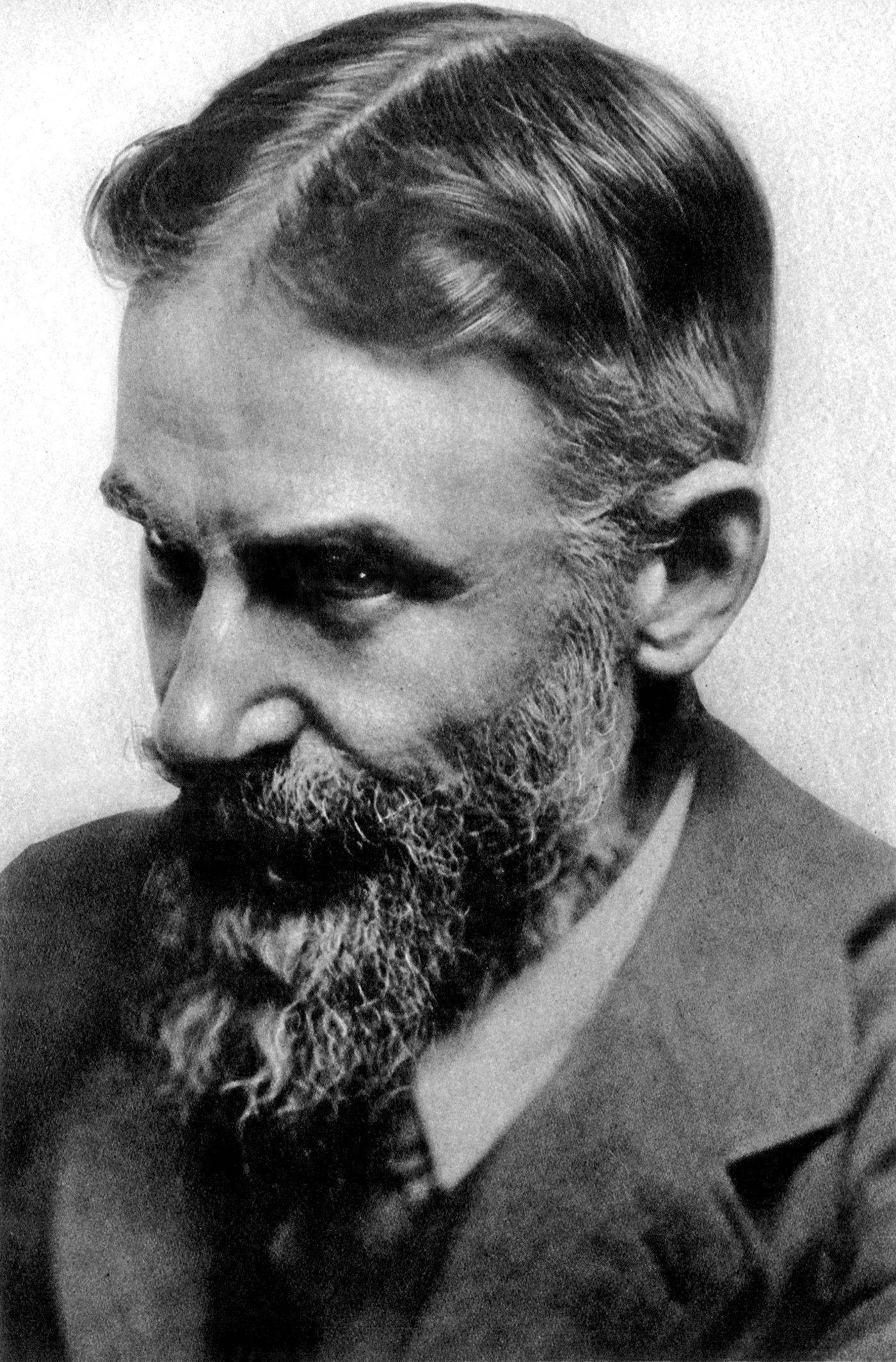
George Bernard Shaw was critical of the book's message.

Critics have had diverse opinions on the novel. John Ruskin declared Hard Times to be his favourite Dickens work due to its exploration of important social questions. However, Thomas Macaulay branded it "sullen socialism", because Dickens did not fully comprehend the politics of the time. Edwin Percy Whipple criticized the novel in Scribner's Magazine by saying, "'Hard Times' is a satire on political economy, of which Dickens knew little, and the little he did know offended his benevolent feelings..." as he believed Dickens' criticisms of a utilitarian education were misguided. George Bernard Shaw argued Hard Times to be a novel of "passionate revolt against the whole industrial order of the modern world". But he criticized the novel for failing to provide an accurate account of trade unionism of the time, arguing that Slackbridge, the poisonous orator, was "a mere figment of middle-class imagination". Believing that it was very different from Dickens's other novels, Shaw also said: "Many readers find the change disappointing. Others find Dickens worth reading almost for the first time."

F. R. Leavis, in The Great Tradition, described the book as essentially a moral fable, and that 'of all Dickens's works (it is) the one that has all the strengths of his genius – that of a completely serious work of art'. This, however, was a view which he later revised in Dickens the Novelist, which recognised that Dickens's strengths and artistry appeared fully in other works.

Walter Allen characterised Hard Times as being an unsurpassed "critique of industrial society", which was later superseded by works of D. H. Lawrence. G. K. Chesterton said that it was "the harshest of his stories"; whereas George Orwell praised the novel (and Dickens himself) for "generous anger".

== Adaptations ==
The novel was adapted into the 1915 silent film Hard Times, directed by Thomas Bentley.

In 1988, Portuguese director João Botelho adapted the novel to the big screen in Hard Times (shot entirely in black & white), transferring the action to an unspecified industrial Portuguese city of the 1980s.

Hard Times has been adapted three times for BBC Radio. The first version, in 1998, starred John Woodvine as Gradgrind, Tom Baker as Josiah Bounderby, and Anna Massey as Mrs. Sparsit. The second, in 2003, starred Kenneth Cranham as Gradgrind, Philip Jackson as Bounderby, Alan Williams as Stephen, Becky Hindley as Rachael, Helen Longworth as Louisa, Nick Roud as Tom and Eleanor Bron as Mrs. Sparsit. A new adaptation, first broadcast on Radio 4 in September 2024, starred David Morrissey as Gradgrind, Shaun Dooley as Bounderby, Arthur Hughes as Stephen and Jan Ravens as Mrs. Sparsit.

In the theatre, Hard Times was adapted for the stage by Stephen Jeffreys and presented in 1988 as a four actor play at the Ensemble Theatre, directed by Mike O'Brien. It was later adapted for the stage by Michael O'Brien and directed by Marti Maraden at Canada's National Arts Centre in 2000. In 2018 Northern Broadsides toured an adaptation written by Deb McAndrew and directed by Conrad Nelson.

The novel has also been adapted twice as a mini-series for British television, once in 1977 by ITV with Patrick Allen as Gradgrind, Timothy West as Bounderby, Rosalie Crutchley as Mrs. Sparsit and Edward Fox as Harthouse, and again in 1994 by the BBC with Bob Peck as Gradgrind, Alan Bates as Bounderby, Dilys Laye as Mrs. Sparsit, Bill Paterson as Stephen, Harriet Walter as Rachael and Richard E. Grant as Harthouse. This adaptation was aired as a serial on the BBC Schools programme English File, and as a single programme on Christmas Day 1994 on BBC2.

== Sources ==
- Ackroyd, Peter (1991), Dickens: A Biography, HarperCollins, ISBN 0-06-016602-9.
- Allen, Walter (1965), Introduction, Hard Times, by Dickens, Charles, Harper & Row, OCLC 1010817880, archived from the original on 5 November 2004.
- Burton, John (9 September 2001), "Hard Times Summary", GradeSaver.
- Chesterton, G. K. (1911), "Hard Times", Appreciations and Criticisms of the Works of Charles Dickens, pp. 169–177.
- Collins, Phil (1992), Introduction, Hard Times, by Dickens, Charles, Knopf Doubleday Publishing, ISBN 9780679413233.
- French, Henry (25 December 2019) [c. 1870s], Allingham, Philip V. (ed.), "Twenty Plates for Dickens's Hard Times for These Times in the British Household Edition", Victorian Web.
- Gardner, Lyn (22 February 2018), "Hard Times review – Northern Broadsides make Dickens a laugh factory", The Guardian, London
- House, Madeline; Storey, Graham; Tillotson, Kathleen, eds. (1993), The Letters of Charles Dickens, vol. VIII, Oxford University Press, ISBN 0-19-812617-4.
- Leavis, F. R. (1963), The Great Tradition, New York University Press, OCLC 1175447
- Shaw, George Bernard (2 November 1911), Introduction, Hard Times, by Dickens, Charles, The Waverley Edition of the Works of Charles Dickens, vol. 17, Waverley Book Company, pp. v–xvi, hdl:2027/coo.31924064974011.
- "Sissy Jupe in Hard Times", Shmoop.
- Thorold, Dinny (1995), Introduction, Hard Times, by Dickens, Charles, Wordsworth Classics, pp. ix–xxiv, ISBN 9781853262326.
