= The Headmaster (film) =

1921 film

- Directed by: Kenelm Foss
- Written by: Kenelm Foss
- Based on: The Headmaster by Edward Knoblock and Wilfred Coleby
- Produced by: H.W. Thompson
- Starring: Cyril Maude; Margot Drake; Miles Malleson
- Production company: Astra Films
- Distributed by: Astra Films
- Release date: January 1921
- Country: United Kingdom
- Languages: Silent; English intertitles

The Headmaster is a 1921 British silent comedy-drama film directed by Kenelm Foss and starring Cyril Maude, Margot Drake and Miles Malleson. It is based on the 1913 play The Headmaster by Edward Knoblock and Wilfred Coleby. The film can be summarized as a clergyman working as the headmaster of a school tries to persuade his daughter to marry the idiotic son of an influential figure in the hope of being promoted to bishop.

== Cast ==
- Cyril Maude as Rev. Cuthbert Sanctuary
- Margot Drake as Portia Sanctuary
- Miles Malleson as Palliser Grantley
- Marie Illington as Cornelia Grantley
- Lionelle Howard as Jack Strahan
- Simeon Stuart as Dean of Carchester
- Ann Trevor as Antigone Sanctuary
- Louie Freear as Bella
- Will Corrie as Sgt. Munton
- Alan Selby as Richards
- Gordon Craig as Stuart Minor

== Bibliography ==
- Low, Rachael. History of the British Film, 1918-1929. George Allen & Unwin, 1971.
