= The Headmaster (play) =

1913 play

The Headmaster is a British comedy play by Edward Knoblock and Wilfred Coleby which was first staged in 1913. A farce, it involves a clergyman working as the headmaster of a school who tries to persuade his daughter to marry the idiotic son of an influential figure in the hope of being promoted to bishop.

== Adaptation ==
In 1921 the play was turned into a silent film The Headmaster directed by Kenelm Foss.

== Bibliography ==
- Low, Rachael. History of the British Film, 1918-1929. George Allen & Unwin, 1971.
