= The Street of Adventure (film) =

1921 film

- Directed by: Kenelm Foss
- Written by: Philip Gibbs (novel); Kenelm Foss
- Produced by: H.W. Thompson
- Starring: Lionelle Howard; Margot Drake; Irene Rooke
- Production company: Astra Films
- Distributed by: Astra Films
- Release date: August 1921
- Country: United Kingdom
- Languages: Silent; English intertitles

The Street of Adventure is a 1921 British silent drama film directed by Kenelm Foss and starring Lionelle Howard, Margot Drake and Irene Rooke. It was based on the 1919 novel of the same title by Philip Gibbs. The title is a reference to Fleet Street in London.

== Premise ==
A journalist attempts to save a woman from prostitution, but nearly loses his fiancée to another man in the process.

== Technical Information ==
The silent film was shot on 1,733 metres of film, in a printed film format of 35mm, using a spherical cinematographic process.

== Cast ==
- Lionelle Howard as Frank Luttrell
- Margot Drake as Katherine Halstead
- Irene Rooke as Margaret Hubbard
- Peggy Bayfield as Peg
- Roy Travers as Will Brandon
- Will Corrie as Edmund Grattan
- H.V. Tollemach

== Bibliography ==
- Low, Rachael. History of the British Film, 1918-1929. George Allen & Unwin, 1971.
