= Diamond Necklace =

Diamond Necklace may refer to:

- "The Necklace" or "The Diamond Necklace", an 1884 short story by Guy de Maupassant
- The Diamond Necklace (film), a 1921 British silent film directed by Denison Clift
- Kanthahaar or Diamond Necklace, a 1930 Indian silent film starring Durgadas Bannerjee and B. S. Rajhans
- Diamond Necklace (film), a 2012 Indian film directed by Lal Jose

== See also ==
- Necklace of Diamonds, an Indian strategy to partner with China's neighbors
- Affair of the Diamond Necklace, a mysterious incident in the 1780s at the court of Louis XVI of France involving his wife, Queen Marie Antoinette
  - The Affair of the Necklace, a 2001 film based on above incident
