= Lady Constance Malleson =

British writer and actress (1895–1975)

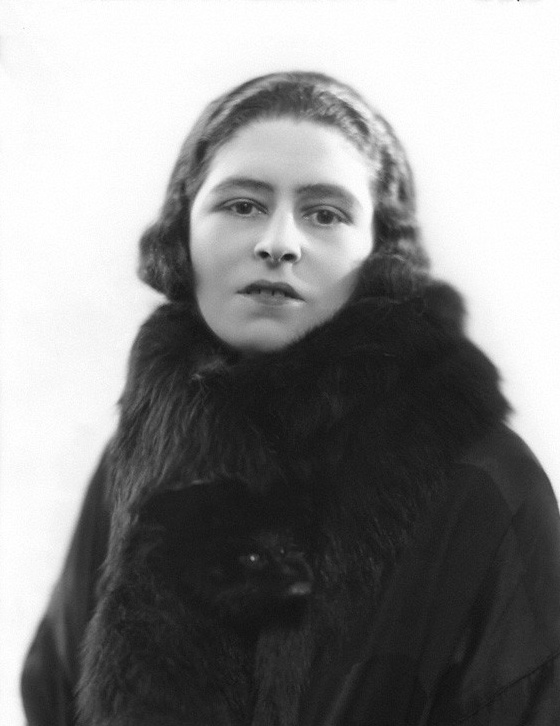
- Lady Constance Malleson in 1922
- Born: Constance Mary Annesley; 24 October 1895; Castlewellan Castle, Northern Ireland
- Died: 5 October 1975 (aged 79); Bury St Edmunds, Suffolk, England
- Other names: Colette O'Niel
- Occupations: writer and actress
- Years active: 1915–1936

Lady Constance Malleson (24 October 1895 – 5 October 1975) was a British writer and actress (appearing as Colette O'Niel). The daughter of Hugh Annesley, 5th Earl Annesley, Malleson studied at the Royal Academy of Drama Art and was a popular theatre performer.

During her twenty-year acting career she appeared in numerous productions across the United Kingdom including several productions at prominent theaters in London's West End and in Maurice Elvey's 1918 silent film Hindle Wakes. Before retiring from acting Malleson wrote and produced The Way a three act starring Una O'Connor, Charles Carson, and Moyna Macgill.

Active in pacifist and social reform efforts, Malleson spent the remainder of her career traveling and writing. She released several novels and autobiographical accounts, including In the north : autobiographical fragments in Norway, Sweden, Finland, 1936-1946 about her experiences in Scandinavia administering relief efforts in response to the Russo-Finnish War. Among her most notable releases is the 1933 novel The Coming Back. Though she denied the suggestion, it is understood as a roman à clef regarding Malleson's relationship with philosopher and political activist Bertrand Russell, with whom she shared an interest in pacifism. Friends until Russell's death, the pair were romantically involved from 1916 to 1920, during Malleson's mutually open marriage to actor Miles Malleson.

== Biography ==
=== Early life ===
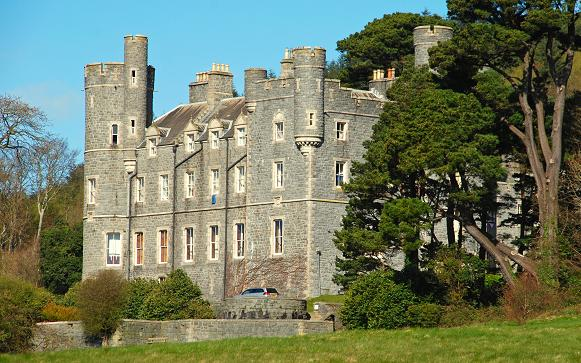
Castlewellan Castle (2009)

Malleson was born Constance Mary Annesley on 24 October 1895 at Castlewellan Castle in Castlewellan, Northern Ireland. She was the youngest child of Hugh Annesley, 5th Earl Annesley, and his second wife Priscilla Cecilia Armytage-Moore. Annesley's sister, Lady Clare Annesley, was a feminist and pacifist who stood as a Labour Party parliamentary candidate in the 1920s and 1930s. She also had two half siblings, Lady Mabel Annesley and Francis Annesley, 6th Earl Annesley, from her father's first marriage to Mabel Wilhelmina Frances Markham. Malleson was home schooled by tutors until her father's death in 1908, at which time she was sent to Down House in Kent. Unimpressed with the school, she referred to it in her 1931 autobiography, After Ten, as "Damned Hell", demonstrating an early contempt for aristocratic decorum.

=== Career ===
Annesley enrolled at the Royal Academy of Dramatic Art in 1913 after attending finishing school in Dresden and studying French in Paris. While there she met Miles Malleson, whom she married on 12 April 1915 at the age of 19. The couple divorced in December 1922 after Miles failed to comply with a decree for restitution of conjugal rights obtained by Constance on 15 May the same year. After graduating she spent the 1922 season with the Plymouth Repertory Theatre as lead actress. Malleson took up acting because she believed "that every woman ought to be able to earn a living." She was concerned with fair wages for all actors, going on to speak publicly about the importance of securing the minimum wage of 3 pounds a week and payment for rehearsal for everyone, not just lead actors.

Malleson appeared in many West End productions, including The Orphans at the Lyceum Theatre, and at least one film, Hindle Wakes. She joined the Hull Repertory Theatre Company for the 1925 season appearing in several productions including Peter and Paul and Advertising April, alongside actor Colin Clive, and a C. K. Munro production of At Mrs. Beam's. Malleson believed that the short run plays that define repertory theatre were important for the development of young dramatists because they provided an opportunity to see how an audience reacts to one's work. In March 1928, Malleson produced a stage version of her three-act play The Way at the Arts Theatre Club in London. The cast, which included Una O'Connor and Charles Carson, was headed by Moyna Macgill in the role of Rosaleen Moore, a part written for her by Malleson. The play, which debuted on 25 March, was performed twice and was reviewed by The Times as a "pretentious sham!"

During the First World War, her pacifist opinions brought her into contact with Bertrand Russell. The pair met in 1916 at a trial for Clifford Allen, then, chairman of the No-Conscription Fellowship. Having mutually agreed to an open marriage with her husband, Malleson and Russell carried on a relationship until 1920. During that time Russell struggled with how seriously Malleson took her career and her continued involvement with other men. Their affair eventually ended because she did not want children. The pair remained friends and corresponded until Russell's death in 1970. He didn't feel that acting made sufficient use of her talents and encouraged a writing career after she rejected his suggestion to become more politically active. It was Russell who submitted Malleson's first published short story, "The End", which was released in the September 1919 edition of the English Review under the pseudonym Christine Harte. Malleson eventually sold her letters from Russell and other mementos to McMaster University for inclusion in the Bertrand Russell Archives.

=== Writing and travel ===
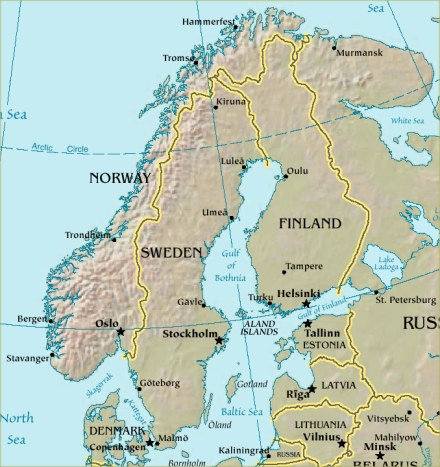
Map of Nordic countries

After retiring from acting Malleson moved to the country, traveled and authored several books. Her autobiography was published in 1931 followed by her first novel, The Coming Back in 1933. Despite claiming it as fiction the work is considered a roman à clef regarding her relationship with Russell. Described by John G. Slater as a "thinly disguised account", the novel features Russell as an astronomer from Cambridge, named Don Gregorio del Orellano, with other characters acting as stand ins for prominent people in Malleson's relationship with Russell, including Dora Russell, Clifford Allen, T.S. Eliot and Maurice Elvey. Malleson would later disown the work claiming it to be a "feeble first effort."

Malleson traveled extensively throughout her life including visits to the Middle East and Africa, in addition to frequent trips to the Nordic countries. She carried out lecture tours in the Nordic countries during the 1930s and 1940s, speaking on social reform topics including mental health and blood supply. In 1941, while working in Finland assist with relief efforts in response to the Russo-Finnish War, Malleson found herself stranded in a remote area of the country when the Germans took control of the country to fight Russian forces. She escaped by rowing 25 miles to Helsinki in a boat, where she was held for several days, before securing passage to Stockholm aboard a Swedish warship. Her time in the Nordic countries resulted in the publication of In the North: Autobiographical Fragments in Norway, Sweden, Finland in 1946.

=== Death ===
Malleson died in a nursing home near Bury St Edmunds on 5 October 1975.

== Stage roles ==
Title	Year(s)	Role	Theatre	Notes	Ref(s)
The World of Boredom	1915	Suzanne	Queen's Theatre	July	
L'Enfant Prodique	1916	Phrynette			
Fishpingle	1916	Lady Margaret Maltravers	Haymarket Theatre	May	
Phyl	1918	Maybel Ponsonby	Gaiety Theatre	May	
The King and Queen	1919	Ila	The Comedy Theatre	February	
The Trojan Women	1919	Helen	Royal Victoria Hall	October	
Sakuntala	1919	Anasuya	Winter Garden	November	
Abraham Lincoln	1921	Mrs. Otherley	Lyceum Theatre	July	
Deburau	1921	Mme. Rébard	Ambassadors Theatre	3–26 November 1921	
The Rise of Silas Lapham	1922	Nan Corey	Lyric Theatre	20–24 February 1922	
The Orphans	1923	Henriette	Lyceum Theatre	28 February – 7 April	
The Country Wife	1924	Squeamish	Regent Theatre	17–18 February	
John Gabriel Borkman	1925	Mrs. Wilton	Hull Repertory Theatre Company	September	
Peter and Paul	1925	Eva	Hull Repertory Theatre Company	September	
Young Heaven	1925	[Lead actress]	Hull Repertory Theatre Company	October	
Advertising April	1925	Rachel Shaw	Hull Repertory Theatre Company	November	
At Mrs. Beam's	1925	Miss Cheezle			
From Morn to Midnight	1926	Lady	Regent Theatre	9–20 March	
The Cradle Song	1927	The Vicaress	Hull Repertory Theatre Company	October	
Belinda	Unknown	Unknown	Unknown		

== Works ==
=== Publications ===
- After ten. London: Cape. 1931. OCLC 847145287.
- The coming back. A novel. London, Toronto: Cape. 1933. OCLC 7061516.
- Fear in the Heart. A novel. London: Collins. 1936. OCLC 561597819.
- In the north: autobiographical fragments in Norway, Sweden, Finland, 1936-1946. London. 1946. OCLC 614608702.
- As the Sight is Bent (1964) (edited by Constance Malleson, an unfinished autobiography of her half-sister Mabel Marguerite Annesley with 35 of her wood engravings)

=== Stage plays ===
- The Way (1928)

=== Short stories and articles ===
- "The End". English Review: 235–238. September 1919.
- "Letters Posted and Unposted". English Review: 261–266. September 1920.
- "Letters Posted and Unposted (ii)". English Review: 320–326. October 1920.
- "Letters Posted and Unposted (iii)". English Review: 425–430. November 1920.
- "Letters Posted and Unposted (iv)". English Review: 500–505. December 1920.
- "Letters Posted and Unposted (v)". English Review: 26–30. January 1921.
- "Letters Posted and Unposted (vi)". English Review: 142–146. February 1921.
- "Letters Posted and Unposted (viI)". English Review: 244–247. March 1921.
