= String of pearls =

String of pearls may refer to:

- A necklace made of pearls

== Arts and entertainment ==
- A String of Pearls (film), a 1912 film directed by D. W. Griffith
- A Pearl Necklace or A String of Pearls, a 1926 Chinese silent film
- The String of Pearls, an 1846 serial novel that introduced the character Sweeney Todd
- String of Pearls (album), a 1991 album by Deborah Conway, or the title song
- String of Pearls: A Greatest Hits Collection, a 2000 album by Prairie Oyster
- String of Pearls, a 2021 album by Annabelle Chvostek
- A String of Pearls, a 1997 album by Ib Glindemann
- "A String of Pearls" (song), a 1941 jazz standard written by Jerry Gray and Eddie DeLange, popularized by Glenn Miller
- Octatonic scale, known as "string of pearls" in traditional Persian music

== Other uses ==
- String of Pearls (Indian Ocean), a geopolitical theory
- Curio rowleyanus, or string-of-pearls, a flowering plant
- Pearl circle, or string of pearls, a design element on some coins

== See also ==
- Pearl necklace (disambiguation)
- "A String of Pearls Twined with Golden Flowers", a Romanian fairy-tale
