= Pearl necklace =

Pearl necklace may refer to:

- A necklace made of pearls

== Music ==
- "Pearl Necklace" (song), a song by ZZ Top
- "Pearl Necklace", a song by MorissonPoe featured on Perfect Dark Zero

== Other uses ==
- Pearl Necklace (horse), an American Thoroughbred racehorse
- Pearl necklace (sexual act)
- A Pearl Necklace, a 1926 Chinese silent film

== See also ==
- String of pearls (disambiguation)
