= The Will (1921 film) =

1921 film

- Directed by: A. V. Bramble
- Written by: J. M. Barrie (play); Eliot Stannard
- Starring: Milton Rosmer; Evangeline Hilliard; Anthony Holles; Mary Brough
- Production company: Ideal Film Company
- Distributed by: Ideal Film Company
- Release date: 1921
- Country: United Kingdom
- Language: English

The Will is a 1921 British silent drama film directed by A. V. Bramble and starring Milton Rosmer, Evangeline Hilliard and Anthony Holles. It was based on the 1914 play The Will by J. M. Barrie. The plot revolves around the widow of a rich woman whose daughter falls in love with the family chauffeur.

In terms of screen adaptations of Barrie's plays "during the 1920s in Britain only the plays The Twelve-Pound Look and The Will, both starring Milton Rosmer were filmed. "

== Cast ==
- Milton Rosmer - Philip Ross
- Evangeline Hilliard - Emily Ross
- Anthony Holles - Charles Ross
- J. Fisher White - Mr. Devises
- Alec Fraser - Robert Devises
- Reginald Bach - Lord Chelsea
- Mary Brough - Bessie
