= The Necklace =

1884 short story by Guy de Maupassant

- Short story by Guy de Maupassant
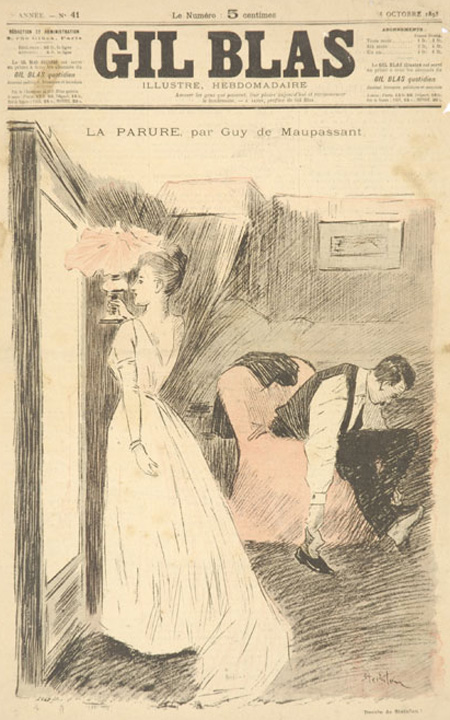
- Title page of Gil Blas which featured the story on 8 October 1893
- Original title: La Parure
- Country: France
- Genre: Short story

Publication
- Publication date: 1884
- Published in English: 1896

"The Necklace", or sometimes "The Diamond Necklace", (French: La Parure) is a short story by Guy de Maupassant, first published on 17 February 1884 in the French newspaper Le Gaulois. It is known for its twist ending, a hallmark of Maupassant's style.

== Plot ==
Madame Mathilde Loisel is a beautiful but discontented woman born into a modest family who dreams of wealth, glamour and social prestige, a life she believes she was meant for but cannot afford on the salary of her husband, a clerk at the Ministry of Education.

One day, her husband surprises her by bringing home an invitation to a grand ball hosted by the minister. While he is excited about the chance to attend such a prestigious event, she frets that she has nothing suitable to wear. Her husband sacrifices his savings of 400 francs, intended for a hunting rifle, to buy her a beautiful new dress. Mathilde remains dissatisfied, however, as she has no jewels to wear with it. She rejects her husband's idea of wearing fresh flowers, but takes up his suggestion of borrowing jewellery from her wealthy friend, Mme Forestier. Mme Forestier is happy to help, and offers Mathilde many fine pieces to choose from. She selects a diamond necklace.

At the ball, Mathilde enjoys dancing with influential men, and revels in the attention. However, upon returning home, Mathilde discovers that the necklace is missing. Panicked, she and her husband search extensively but unsuccessfully. Afraid to admit the loss to Mme Forestier, the Loisels decide they will have to replace the necklace. They visit numerous jewellers until they find an almost identical model, for which they have to pay 36,000 francs. Mr Loisel uses an inheritance from his father to cover half the cost and borrows the rest at high interest. Mathilde gives the necklace to Mme Forestier, who does not notice the substitution.

To repay the debt, the Loisels dismiss their maid, move into a small, shabby apartment, and take on long hours of gruelling work. It takes ten years for the Loisels to repay their debts and accumulated interest, by which time Mathilde has lost her youthful beauty and become prematurely aged from her years of poverty and toil.

Debt-free at last, Mathilde encounters Mme Forestier by chance in the street. Having not seen her former friend for ten years, Mme Forestier barely recognises her. Feeling confident enough now to confess, Mathilde tells Mme Forestier the truth about losing the necklace, replacing it, and about the hard times she has endured. A horrified Mme Forestier reveals that the necklace she had lent to Mathilde was not made of real diamonds, and was worth no more than five hundred francs.

== Adaptations and other influences ==
- The Necklace (1909), an American silent film directed by D. W. Griffith.
- The Diamond Necklace (1921), a British silent film directed by Denison Clift and starring Milton Rosmer, Jessie Winter, and Warwick Ward
- The Pearl Necklace (Chinese: 一串珍珠) (1926), also known as A String of Pearls, a Chinese film directed by Li Zeyuan
- The Necklace (1949), the first episode of the NBC-TV series Your Show Time (producer Stanley Rubin won the first-ever Emmy Award for this episode)
- "The Diamond Necklace" (1975), episode #276 of the CBS Radio Mystery Theater radio show series adapted by George Lowther.
- Mathilde (2008), a stage musical by the Irish composer Conor Mitchell
- "දියමන්ති මාලය" (Diyamanthi Maalaya), a Sinhala translation by K. G. Karunathilake of Sri Lanka

The following works were inspired in part by "The Necklace":

- "Paste" (1899), a short story by Henry James in which the twist ending is reversed
- "Mr. Know-All" (1925) and "A String of Beads" (1943), short stories by Somerset Maugham that both revolve around the price of a necklace
- "The Diamond Pendant" in Impact #1, E.C. Comics, March/April 1955; adaptation by Carl Wessler, illustrated by Graham Ingels
- Doctor Innocentanu (2012), a Malayalam family drama film is inspired by The Necklace.
- Vennila Veedu (2014), a Tamil family drama uses a similar story as its main theme.
- In Vladimir Nabokov's novel Ada or Ardor (1969), one of the characters, a writer, claims she has written a short story entitled "La Rivière du diamants", which mimics Maupassant's "The Necklace".
