= Hull Repertory Theatre Company =

Theatre company in Kingston upon Hull, England

The Hull Repertory Theatre Company was a theatre company in Kingston upon Hull, East Riding of Yorkshire, England. It was founded in 1924 by Arthur Whatmore. In the 1930s it was managed by Pepino Santangelo who developed it and it became the Hull New Theatre in 1939.

== History ==
=== 1924–1933 ===
Arthur Whatmore visited Hull in December 1923 to produce a play for the Amateur Operatic Society. Finding there was local support for a repertory theatre, he returned the following year and founded the Hull Repertory Theatre Company. Whatmore then booked the Lecture Hall, part of the Assembly Rooms in Kingston Square. The proprietors, Morton's Limited, headed by William Morton, the 'Grand Old Man of Hull', also owned and managed the Alexandra Theatre and four Hull cinemas. (The lecture hall itself was on the site of the former Central Fire Station.) The Hull Amateur Operatic Society and the newly formed Hull Playgoers' Society gave their support to the scheme. Whatmore opened on 13 September 1924 for a four-week season of modern plays with a core of professional actors supplemented by local amateurs. The experiment was successful and led to regular bookings. The rooms became known as the Little Theatre.

From time to time, negotiations took place with Morton's about purchasing the property. Finally, in 1928 decisions were made about price and also about the purchase of a neighbouring house. The company became the Hull Repertory Theatre Company Limited. Another company, to be known as the Little Theatre (Hull) Limited, was formed to buy the hall. Contracts were exchanged on 15 January 1929 and shares in the company were offered to the public at £5. The whole scheme, which included the purchasing of two adjoining houses, taking back and re-building of the stage, creating dressing rooms and offices, and the redecorating of the whole theatre, cost £17,000. It reopened on 14 September 1929. A fire broke out backstage overnight on 21 January 1930 and the theatre was closed for repairs for 2 months.

By June 1930 (when Whatmore moved to London) he had produced eighty-one plays in Hull. Carl Bernard, who had recently joined the company, was appointed in his place. Two years later, Bernard resigned after policy disputes with the management. The theatre was temporarily closed.

=== 1933–1939 ===
After a series of negotiations, the two companies were amalgamated in 1933. Peppino Santangelo was appointed as the next manager. In 1934, he reported that his theatre had been more profitable than any of the other 15 theatres in the Repertory Theatres Association. The early part of that 1934 continued profitably, but by August, attendances had dropped. Santangelo was a pragmatist, willing to adjust his programme to suit his clients. The theatre survived and sometimes flourished.

In 1939 the company raised funds, sold the Little Theatre and acquired the neighbouring Assembly Rooms, which were then converted into the Hull New Theatre.

== Talented actors ==
From its inception the company fostered talented young actors, many of whom went on to greater fame on the London stage or in film. Examples have been:

- Sebastian Shaw, 1924
- Roland Culver, debut performance, 1924, as Paul in Peter and Paul
- Colin Clive, 1925
- Colette O'Niel, 1925
- Edith Sharpe, 1927–1928
- Margaretta Scott, August 1928, as Catherine m The Lilies of the Field
- Margaret Vines, from September 1928 – June 1929, played juvenile leads in Caste, On Approval, If Four Walls Told, Dear Brutus, Magic, etc.
- André van Gyseghem, juvenile leads, September 1928 – July 1930,
- Alan Wheatley, 1929–1930
- Hilary Eaves, debut performance, 1932, in The Admirable Crichton
- Ernest Hare, 1932
- Gerald Savory, 1932–1933
- Michael Mac Owan, producer, 1933–1934
- Cathleen Cordell, playing juvenile leads, 1934
- Maurice Denham, Hubert in The Marquise, 1934.
- Noel Howlett, producer, 1935
- Jack Minster, producer, 1935–1938
- Stewart Granger, debut, August 1935, as Andrea Strozzi in The Cardinal. He remained at Hull, where he eventually played leading parts, 1935–1936
- Ambrosine Phillpotts, playing leads, 1935–1937
- William Mervyn, stage manager and actor, 1934–1937
