= The Grass Orphan =

1922 film by Frank Hall Crane

- Directed by: Frank Hall Crane
- Written by: I.A.R. Wylie (novel)
- Starring: Margaret Bannerman; Reginald Owen; Douglas Munro
- Production company: Ideal Film Company
- Distributed by: Ideal Film Company
- Release date: December 1922
- Country: United Kingdom
- Language: English

The Grass Orphan is a 1922 British silent drama film directed by Frank Hall Crane and starring Margaret Bannerman, Reginald Owen and Douglas Munro. It was based on the 1913 novel The Paupers of Portman Square by I.A.R. Wylie.

== Cast ==
- Margaret Bannerman
- Reginald Owen
- Douglas Munro
- Lawford Davidson

== Bibliography ==
- Low, Rachael. The History of British Film, Volume 4 1918-1929. Routledge, 1997. ISBN 978-0047910210
