= The Mystery of a Hansom Cab (1915 film) =

1915 film

- Directed by: Harold Weston
- Written by: Fergus Hume (novel); Eliot Stannard
- Starring: Milton Rosmer; Fay Temple; A.V. Bramble
- Production companies: British & Colonial Kinematograph Company
- Distributed by: Ideal Films
- Release date: September 1915
- Country: United Kingdom
- Languages: Silent; English intertitles

The Mystery of a Hansom Cab is a 1915 British silent crime film directed by Harold Weston and starring Milton Rosmer, Fay Temple and A.V. Bramble. It is an adaptation of Fergus Hume's 1886 novel of the same name.

== Cast ==
- Milton Rosmer as Mark Frettleby
- Fay Temple as Madge Frettleby
- A.V. Bramble as Moreland
- Arthur Walcott as Oliver White
- James L. Dale as Brian Fitzgerald

== Bibliography ==
- Low, Rachael. History of the British Film, 1914-1918. Routledge, 2005.
