= Mabel Annesley =

English painter (1881–1959)

Lady Mabel Annesley HRUA
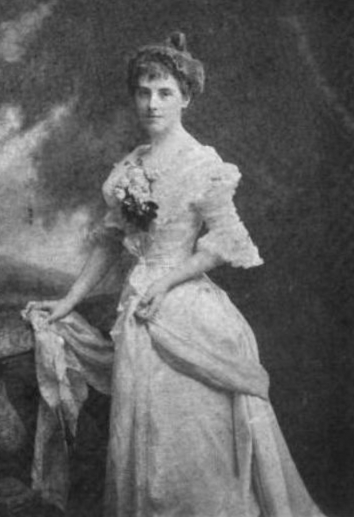
- In The Sketch, 18 April 1900
- Born: Mabel Marquerite Annesley; 25 February 1881; Annesley Lodge, Regent's Park, London, England
- Died: 19 June 1959 (aged 78); Clare, Suffolk, England
- Resting place: Long Melford, Suffolk, England
- Known for: Wood engraving, watercolour painting
- Elected: Ulster Academy of Arts

Lady Mabel Marguerite Annesley HRUA (25 February 1881 – 19 June 1959) was a wood-engraver and watercolour painter. Her work is in many collections, including the British Museum, the Victoria and Albert Museum, the National Gallery of Canada and the Museum of New Zealand. She exhibited in the Festival of Britain in 1952.

== Early life and family ==
She was born on 25 February 1881, at Annesley Lodge, Regent's Park, London, the daughter of Hugh Annesley, 5th Earl Annesley (1831–1908), lieutenant-colonel in the Scots Fusilier Guards and landowner, and his first wife, Mabel Wilhelmina Frances Markham, Countess Annesley (1858–1891). Her mother was the greatgranddaughter of Sir Francis Grant, eminent Victorian portrait painter and president of the Royal Academy. Her half-sister, Lady Constance Malleson was a writer, actress, and mistress of Bertrand Russell.

She was initially taught at home, then in 1895, at fourteen, she began study at the Frank Calderon School of Animal Painting in London. At eighteen she was elected a member of the Belfast Art Society and exhibited with the Society for many years, from 1899 to 1926.

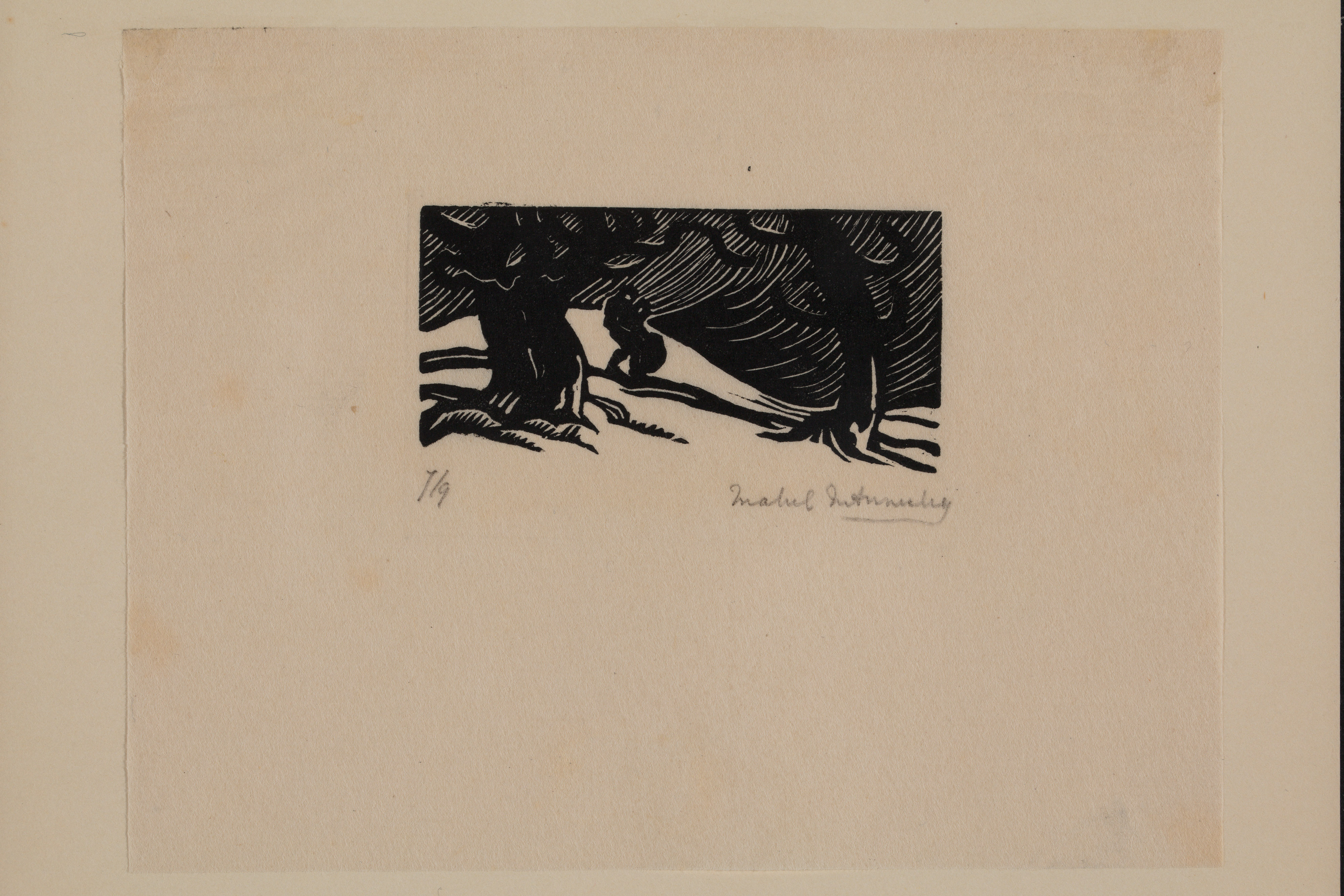
Winter, by Mabel Annesley

She married Gerald Sowerby (1878–1913) in 1904. Sowerby was flag lieutenant to Admiral Prince Louis of Battenberg and flag commander to the commander-in-chief, Portsmouth. The couple had one son, Gerald Francis Sowerby (later Annesley). Her husband died in 1913, and a year later she inherited Castlewellan Castle after the death of her brother Francis. She moved back to the Castle in 1914, and reverted to her maiden name. The Castle was home to a world-famous arboretum, with Annesley working hard to recover from losses incurred due to death duties.

Gerald Francis Sowerby (5 November 1904 – April 1992) married firstly Lady Elizabeth Jocelyn, daughter of the Earl of Roden, secondly Mary Macdonald, and thirdly Elizabeth Cromwell.

== Artistic career ==
At the age of about forty she learnt the technique of wood engraving at the Central School in London under the tutelage of Noel Rooke from 1920 to 1921. She was soon regarded as one of its three or four leading exponents in Britain along with artists like Gwen Raverat and Robert Gibbings. She exhibited 27 prints with the Society of Wood Engravers between 1922 and 1939, being elected a member in 1925. She also exhibited at her studio 12 Lombard Street, Belfast in 1925, lecturing on wood-engraving. Annesley illustrated a number of volumes for the Golden Cockerel Press, including Songs from Robert Burns (1925), and for Duckworths County Down Songs (1924) and Apollo in Mourne (1926) by the Ulsterman Richard Rowley. When she developed arthritis in later life, employing lino in place of boxwood to continue working.

She exhibited with the Watercolour Society of Ireland in 1926, with the Dublin Painters in 1938, and was included in a 1930 exhibition of Irish art held in Brussels. Annesley designed pageant costumes with William Conor for the 1500th anniversary of the landing of St Patrick at Saul, County Down held in 1932 at Castle Ward, Strangford. Circa 1933 a selection of her work, watercolours, wood-engravings, and silverpoints was exhibited at the Batsford Gallery, London. The Ulster Unit exhibition showed her work in 1934, the same year she was elected an honorary member of the Royal Ulster Academy. Her collection of contemporary wood-engravings, alongside 20 of her works, where donated at the Belfast Museum and Art Gallery in 1939.

She moved home several times, living also in Belfast, Connemara and in Rathfriland. During the Second World War she emigrated to New Zealand but returned to England in 1953, settling in Suffolk. Annesley was a trustee of the Bishop Suter Art Gallery in Nelson whilst living in New Zealand, purchasing for the board when she visited England.

== Later life and recognition ==
Lady Mabel Annesley died of myelomatosis on 19 June 1959 in Clare, Suffolk, and was buried in Long Melford, Suffolk. She left an unfinished autobiography called As the Sight Is Bent, which was published by the Museum Press in 1964. In it she says that Paul Nash and David Jones were particular influences. A memorial show of her work was held at the Whitworth Art Gallery in 1960.

She is commemorated by an Ulster History Circle blue plaque at the Arboretum, Castlewellan Forest Park, County Down.

== Arms ==
Coat of arms of Mabel Annesley

Notes
Confirmed 6 October 1915 by George James Burtchaell, Deputy Ulster King of Arms. Arms alone for Mabel herself, crest and motto to her male-line descendants.
Crest
A Moor's head couped at the shoulders Proper wreathed about the temples Argent and Azure.
Torse
Of the colours.
Escutcheon
Paly of six Argent and Azure over all a bend Gules.
Motto
Virtutis Amore
