= Goodbye (1918 film) =

1918 film

Goodbye is a 1918 British drama film directed by Maurice Elvey and starring Margaret Bannerman, Jessie Winter and Donald Calthrop. It was based on a novel by John Strange Winter. It is about a woman who pushes another couple towards divorce then marries the husband.

== Cast ==
- Margaret Bannerman as Florence Tempest
- Jessie Winter as Hope Adair
- Donald Calthrop as Captain Richard Adair
- Douglas Munro as Bates
- Ruth Mackay as Rosalie
- Edward O'Neill as Frith
- Frank Dane as Doctor
- Fewlass Llewellyn as Lawyer
