= Hindle Wakes (1918 film) =

- Directed by: Maurice Elvey
- Written by: Eliot Stannard; Stanley Houghton (play)
- Produced by: William Baker
- Starring: Colette O'Niel; Hayford Hobbs
- Production company: Diamond / Super
- Release date: January 1918
- Country: United Kingdom
- Languages: Silent film English intertitles

Hindle Wakes is a 1918 British silent drama film, directed by Maurice Elvey and starring Colette O'Niel and Hayford Hobbs. It is the first of four screen versions of the celebrated and controversial 1912 play by Stanley Houghton. It which was a sensation in its time for its daring assertions that a woman could enjoy a sexual fling just as much as a man, without feeling any guilt or obligation to explain herself, and that she was perfectly capable of making her own life decisions without interference from family or the need to bow to social pressures.

Elvey was reported to be unsatisfied with the way the film turned out and, believing he could do better, directed a remake in 1927, producing what is now regarded as a classic of British silent cinema.

== Cast ==
- Colette O'Niel as Fanny Hawthorne
- Hayford Hobbs as Alan Jeffcote
- Norman McKinnel as Nat Jeffcote
- Edward O'Neill as Chris Hawthorne
- Ada King as Mrs. Hawthorne
- Margaret Bannerman as Beatrice Farrar
- Frank Dane as Sir Timothy Farrar
- Dolly Tree as Mary Hollins

== Production ==
Filming began in September of 1917, with shooting taking place on location in Blackpool at several resorts. Locations included Pleasure Beach and the Tower Ballroom.
