= Hull New Theatre =

Theatre in Kingston upon Hull, England

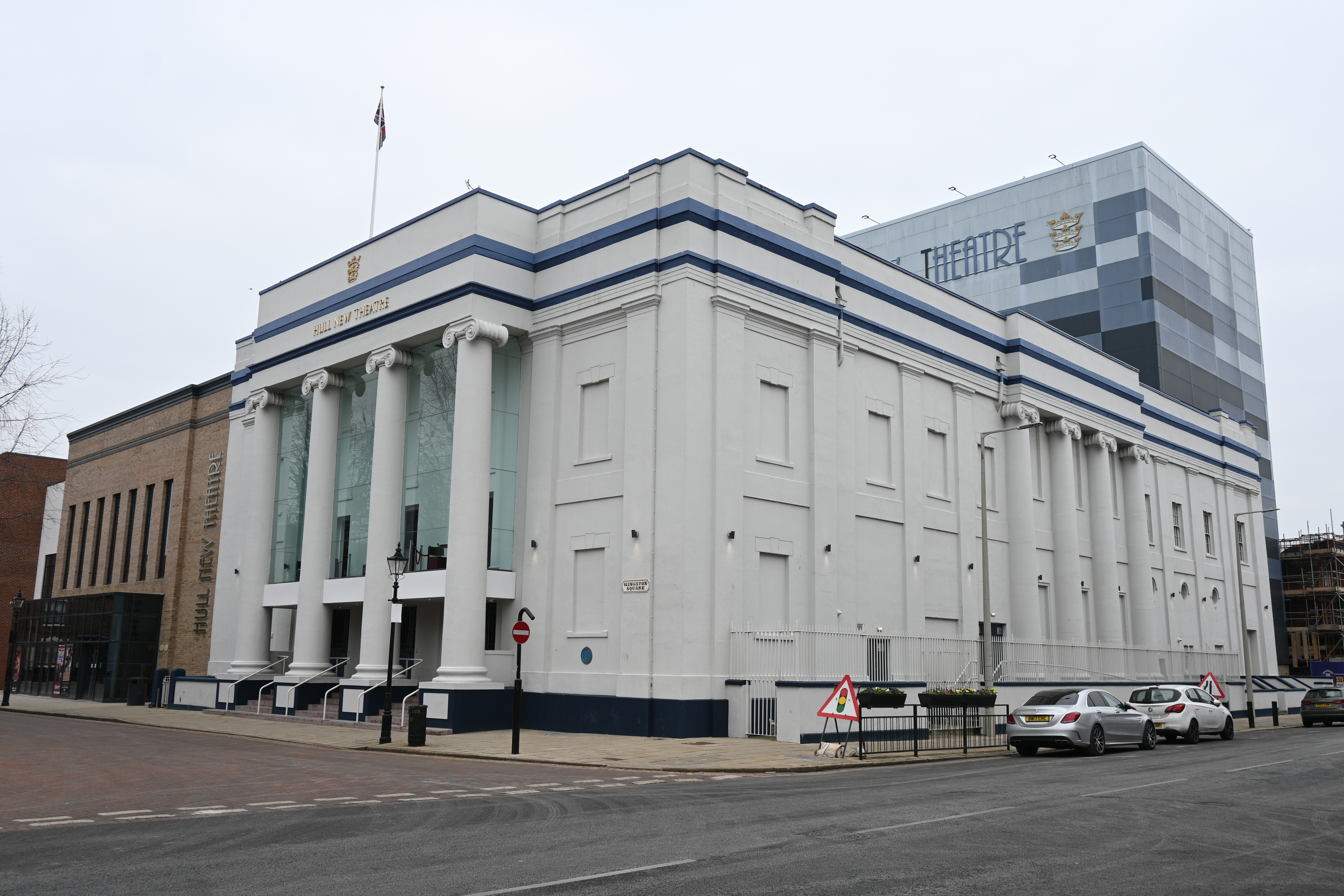
- Interactive map of Hull New Theatre
- Address: Kingston Square; Hull, East Riding of Yorkshire; England
- Coordinates: 53.747000°N 0.336000°W
- Owner: Hull City Council
- Capacity: 1,351

Construction
- Opened: 1939

The Hull New Theatre is a theatre in Kingston upon Hull, East Riding of Yorkshire, England. It opened in 1939 as a successor to the Hull Repertory Theatre Company. The Hull New Theatre features musicals, opera, ballet, drama, children's shows and one-night performances, with a highlight of the year being the annual Christmas pantomime.

The Hull New Theatre is now a Grade II listed building.

The theatre closed on 4 January 2016, after the December 2015 pantomime season, for a major refit in preparation of Hull being the UK City of Culture in 2017. Though £5 million of funding from the Arts Council was not granted Hull City Council intended to press ahead with the £11.7 million project. In the 2016 Budget George Osborne indicated that £13 million would be made available towards the City of Culture work in the city, which the council indicated would be used to cover the shortfall in funding for the theatre refurbishments. In March 2016 the Council announced a delay in the project and that reopening would not take place until summer 2017. In early 2017, it was announced that a one-off performance by The Royal Ballet, on 16 September, would officially reopen the theatre. The theatre opened on 16 September 2017, with an increased capacity, to a sell-out one-off performance by The Royal Ballet which was streamed live to Queen's Gardens to an additional audience of around 5,000.
