= Mary Girl =

1917 film by Maurice Elvey

Mary Girl is a 1917 British silent drama film directed by Maurice Elvey and starring Norman McKinnel, Jessie Winter and Margaret Bannerman.

== Cast ==
- Norman McKinnel as Ezra
- Jessie Winter as Mary
- Margaret Bannerman as Countess Folkington
- Edward O'Neill as George Latimer
- Marsh Allen
