= Margaret Bannerman =

Canadian actress (1896–1976)

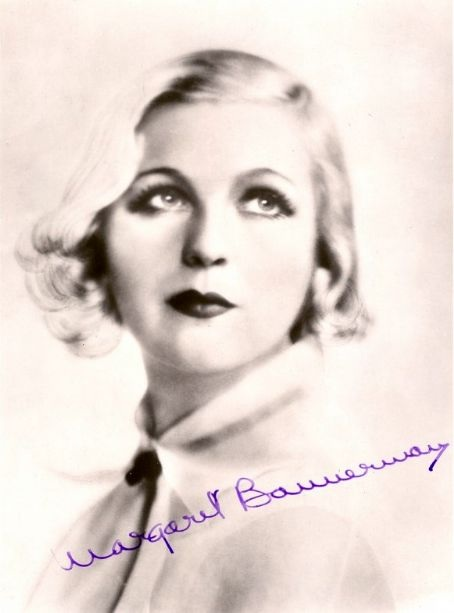
- Born: Marguerite Grand; December 15, 1896; Toronto, Ontario, Canada
- Died: June 14, 1976 (aged 79); Englewood, New Jersey, U.S.
- Occupation: Actress
- Years active: 1917-1947
- Spouse(s): Anthony Prinsep (1919-1921, divorced); Pat Somerset (divorced)

Margaret Bannerman (born Marguerite Grand; December 15, 1896 – June 14, 1976) was a Canadian actress. She is known for her work in the British films The Gay Lord Quex, Lady Audley's Secret and Hindle Wakes. She had a successful career on stage, appearing in revues and light comedy.

== Early life ==
Bannerman was born in Toronto, Ontario on December 15, 1896 to parents Charles Grand and Margaret Hurst. She attended Bishop Strachan School in Toronto, then the Mount Saint Vincent Academy in Halifax, Nova Scotia. The family moved to England at the outbreak of World War I.

== Theatre ==
Grand began her career in English theatre in 1915 in Charlotte's Revue starring Gertrude Lawrence. During the silent age she appeared in several English comedy films. A high point of her acting career was the part of Lady George Graystone in Somerset Maugham's Our Betters, which ran for 548 performances at the Globe Theatre in London, England. A nervous breakdown in 1925 interrupted her acting career. After a year of touring Australia and New Zealand in 1928, she returned to London theatre before moving to the United States in the 1930s. She returned to acting in film in the 1930s, attempting to break into American films. She appeared in films until 1947 and continued in theatre until 1963.

Bannerman performed professionally twice in her hometown, firstly in 1940 in Our Betters at the Royal Alexandra Theatre. She made one final performance in her hometown in November 1963, as Mrs. Higgins in the touring company of My Fair Lady. She then retired to an actor's home in Englewood, New Jersey where she continued her life-long interests in furniture and antiques.

== Personal life ==
Bannerman was married twice, to London producer Anthony Prinsep and actor Pat Somerset. In March 1929, Bannerman was in Melbourne where the Australian and English cricket teams where playing the fifth Test match for The Ashes. England's Jack Hobbs became the oldest player to score a Test century, at the age of 46 years and 82 days, with Bannerman congratulating Hobbs with a kiss.

== Selected filmography ==
- Justice (1917) - Miss Cokeson
- The Gay Lord Quex (1917) - Muriel Eden
- Flames (1917) - Cuckoo
- Mary Girl (1917) - Countess Folkington
- Hindle Wakes (1918) - Beatrice Farrar
- Goodbye (1918) - Florence Tempest
- Her Secret (1919) - Margaret Henderson
- Lady Audley's Secret (1920) - Lady Audley
- The Grass Orphan (1922) - Mrs. St. John
- Two White Arms (1932) - Lydie Charrington
- Lily Christine (1932) - Mrs. Abbey
- Over the Garden Wall (1934) - Diana
- The Great Defender (1934) - Laura Locke
- Royal Cavalcade (1935) - Undetermined Minor Role (uncredited)
- I Give My Heart (1935) - Marechale
- Cluny Brown (1946) - Lady Alice Carmel
- The Shocking Miss Pilgrim (1947) - (scenes deleted)
- The Homestretch (1947) - Ellamae Scott
