= Lady Audley's Secret (1920 film) =

1920 film

- Directed by: Jack Denton
- Written by: Eliot Stannard
- Based on: Lady Audley's Secret by Mary Elizabeth Braddon
- Starring: Margaret Bannerman; Manning Haynes; Betty Farquhar; Wallace Bosco
- Production company: Ideal Film Company
- Distributed by: Ideal Film Company
- Release date: October 1920
- Country: United Kingdom
- Language: English

Lady Audley's Secret is a 1920 British silent drama film directed by Jack Denton and starring Margaret Bannerman, Manning Haynes and Betty Farquhar. It was an adaptation of the 1862 novel Lady Audley's Secret by Mary Elizabeth Braddon.

== Plot ==
Sir Michael Audley marries a younger woman. She throws her first husband down a well, is blackmailed by a gardener who knows her secret, and tries to burn him to death. But something goes wrong.

== Cast ==
- Margaret Bannerman - Lady Audley
- Manning Haynes - Robert Audley
- Betty Farquhar - Alysia Audley
- Randolph McLeod - Captain George Talboys
- Wallace Bosco - Luke Marks
- Berenice Melford - Phoebe
- Hubert Willis - Sir Michael Audley
- William Burchill - Captain Malden
- Ida Millais - Mrs Plowson
