= The Diamond Necklace (film) =

1921 British film by Denison Clift

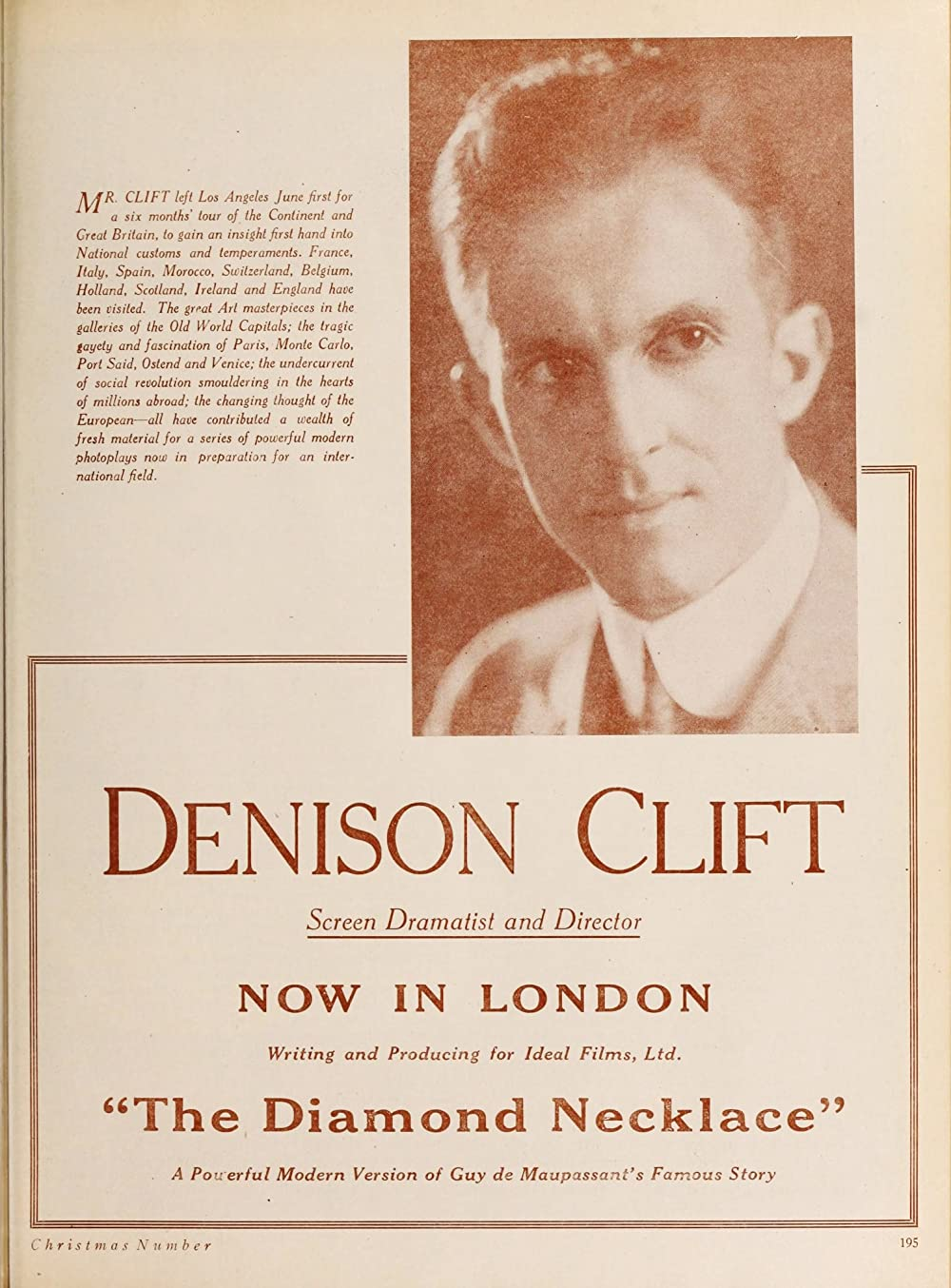
- Directed by: Denison Clift
- Written by: Guy de Maupassant (story)
- Starring: Milton Rosmer; Jessie Winter; Warwick Ward; Mary Brough
- Production company: Ideal Film Company
- Distributed by: Ideal Film Company
- Release date: 1921
- Country: United Kingdom
- Language: English

The Diamond Necklace is a 1921 British silent historical drama film directed by Denison Clift and starring Milton Rosmer, Jessie Winter and Sara Sample. It is based on the short story "The Necklace" by Guy de Maupassant.

== Cast ==
- Milton Rosmer as Charles Furness
- Jessie Winter as Lily Faraday
- Sara Sample as Margaret Bayliss
- Warwick Ward as Ford
- Mary Brough as Mrs. Tudsberry
- Johnny Butt as Maurice Pollard
- F.E. Montague-Thacker as Basil Mortimer
- John Peachey as Mr. Bainbridge
- Madeline Fordyce as Mrs. Faraday
