= The Twelve Pound Look (1920 film) =

1920 film

- Directed by: Jack Denton
- Written by: J.M Barrie (play); Eliot Stannard
- Starring: Milton Rosmer; Jessie Winter; Ann Elliott; Nelson Ramsey
- Cinematography: William Shenton
- Production company: Ideal Film Company
- Distributed by: Ideal Film Company
- Release date: 1920
- Country: United Kingdom
- Language: English

The Twelve Pound Look is a 1920 British silent drama film directed by Jack Denton and starring Milton Rosmer, Jessie Winter and Ann Elliott.

== Plot ==
A woman marries a cold, wealthy businessmen in order to be able to financially support her younger brothers and sisters. She later saves up enough money to buy a typewriter and leaves her husband to work independently as a writer.

== Main cast ==
- Milton Rosmer - Harry Sims
- Jessie Winter - Kate Sims
- Ann Elliott - Emma Sims
- Nelson Ramsey - Jack Lamb
- Athalie Davis - Anne
- Alfred Wellesley - Bernard Roche
- E. Story Gofton - The Rector
- Roy Byford - Sir William Crackley
- Leonard Robson - Mr. Moon
- Eric Hardin - Charles
- Jose Shannon - Mabel

== Production ==
The film was made by the Ideal Film Company, one of the leading British studios of the silent era. It is based on the play The Twelve Pound Look by J.M. Barrie. It received its trade show on 20 September 1920.

== Bibliography ==
- Low, Rachael. The History of British Film, Volume 4 1918-1929. Routledge, 1997.
