= Milton Rosmer =

British actor, director and screenwriter (1881–1971)

- portrait by Bassano Ltd., 1907
- Born: Arthur Milton Lunt; 4 November 1881; Southport, Lancashire, England
- Died: 7 December 1971 (aged 90); Chesham, Buckinghamshire, England
- Occupations: Actor, director, screenwriter
- Spouse: Irene Rooke (m. 1919; died 1958)

Milton Rosmer (4 November 1881 – 7 December 1971) was a British actor, film director and screenwriter. He made his screen debut in The Mystery of a Hansom Cab (1915) and continued to act in theatre, film and television until 1956. In 1926 he directed his first film The Woman Juror and went on to direct another 16 films between 1926 and 1938.

He began his acting career as a stage actor and appeared as Francis Tresham in "The Breed of the Treshams" (1903) opposite John Martin-Harvey.

Milton Rosmer died in Chesham, Buckinghamshire in 1971.

== Partial filmography ==
=== Actor ===
- The Mystery of a Hansom Cab (1915) – Mark Frettleby
- Whoso Is Without Sin (1916) – The Vicar
- Still Waters Run Deep (1916) – John Mildmay
- Cynthia in the Wilderness (1916) – Harvey Elwes
- The Man Without a Soul (1916) – Stephen Ferrier
- Lady Windermere's Fan (1916) – Lord Windermere
- The Greater Need (1916) – Bob Leroy
- Little Women (1917) – Theodore Lawrence
- The Chinese Puzzle (1919) – Sir Roger de la Haye
- The Odds Against Her (1919) – Leo Strathmore
- With All Her Heart (1920) – Geoffrey Bell
- Wuthering Heights (1920) – Heathcliff
- Colonel Newcombe, the Perfect Gentleman (1920) – B. Newcombe
- The Twelve Pound Look (1920) – Harry Sims
- The Golden Web (1920) – Sterling Deans
- Torn Sails (1920) – Hugh Morgan
- Demos (1921) – Richard Mortimer
- The Will (1921) – Philip Ross
- The Diamond Necklace (1921) – Charles Furness
- Belphegor the Mountebank (1921) – Belphegor
- The Amazing Partnership (1921) – Pryde
- A Woman of No Importance (1921) – Lord Illingworth
- General John Regan (1921) – Dr. O'Grady
- A Romance of Wastdale (1921) – David Gordon
- The Passionate Friends (1922) – Steven Stratton
- David Garrick (1922, Short) – David Garrick
- The Pointing Finger (1922) – Lord Rollestone / Earl Edensore
- Tense Moments with Great Authors (1922) – David Garrick (segment "David Garrick")
- La donna e l'uomo (1923)
- A Gamble with Hearts (1923) – Dallas Chalfont
- Shadow of Egypt (1924) – Harold Westcott
- High Treason (1929) – Ernest Stratton (uncredited)
- The W Plan (1930) – President of Court Martial
- Grand Prix (1934)
- The Phantom Light (1935) – Dr. Carey
- South Riding (1938) – Alderman Snaith
- Let's Be Famous (1939) – Albert Pinbright
- Goodbye, Mr. Chips (1939) – Chatteris
- The Lion Has Wings (1939) – Head of Observer Corps
- The Stars Look Down (1940) – Harry Nugent, MP
- Return to Yesterday (1940) – Sambourne
- Atlantic Ferry (1941) – George Burns
- Frieda (1947) – Merrick
- Fame Is the Spur (1947) – Magistrate
- The End of the River (1947) – The Judge
- Who Killed Van Loon? (1948) – Simmonds
- Daybreak (1948) – Governor
- The Monkey's Paw (1948) – Mr. Trelawne
- The Small Back Room (1949) – Prof. Mair
- John Wesley (1954) – Trustee of Georgia

=== Screenwriter ===
- Balaclava (1928)

=== Director ===
- The Perfect Lady (1931)
- P.C. Josser (1931)
- Many Waters (1931)
- After the Ball (1932)
- Channel Crossing (1933)
- The Secret of the Loch (1934)
- What Happened to Harkness? (1934)
- Emil and the Detectives (1935)
- Everything Is Thunder (1936)
- The Great Barrier (1937)
- The Challenge (1938)
