= Castlewellan Forest Park =

Park in County Down, Northern Ireland

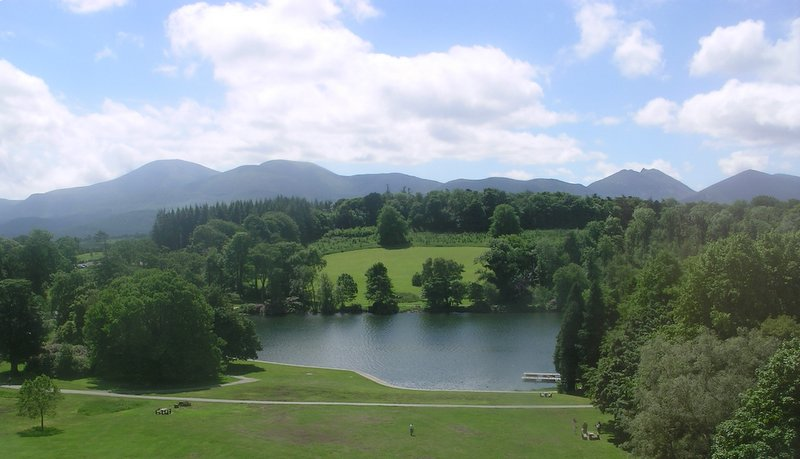
- Castlewellan Lake, Castlewellan Forest Park, with the Mourne Mountains in the background

- Location within Northern Ireland

Geography
- Location: Down, Northern Ireland, United Kingdom
- Coordinates: 54°15′54″N 5°57′22″W
- Area: 450 hectares (1,100 acres)

Administration
- Authority: Forest Service Northern Ireland

Castlewellan Forest Park is located in the town of Castlewellan in County Down, Northern Ireland.

The park covers some 460 hectares, including woodland and a 40 hectare lake. It was opened to the public in 1967 after the Forest Service of the Department of Agriculture purchased the land from the Annesley family. Features of the park include the Castlewellan Arboretum & Annesley Garden, the Peace Maze and Castlewellan Castle.

== Castlewellan Arboretum & Anneseley Garden ==
The forest park is home to the Castlewellan Arboretum & Annesley Garden which was established in 1740 and now contains "One of the most remarkable tree collections not only in Ireland but in the whole of Europe.". The arboretum originally focused on the 12 1/2 acre walled garden and now extends to a total of 120 acres. Giant sequoia were planted in the 1850s. They are used by treecreepers, who burrow into its bark and make nests. The gardens originally contained over 1800 species of trees and shrubs, planted by Hugh Annesley, 5th Earl Annesley and his head gardener. Over 700 taxa still exist in the arboretum, including at least 30 champion trees.

The gardens suffered from a decline in maintenance in the late 1990s due to a shortage of resources. Work to restore and conserve a number of areas, including the greenhouses and the Moorish Tower, was carried out between 2012 and 2014. Comprehensive plans for restoration of the whole park have been agreed between the Forest Service and the local Council. In 2021 a project to further restore the arboretum and the courtyard was announced. The park received £5.5 million, with half coming from the National Lottery Heritage Fund and half from Newry, Mourne and Down District Council.

The five-hectare (12 1/2 acre) walled garden is the centre of the arboretum. It features formal paths, ornamental fountains, and a number of rare trees and shrubs. Notable specimens include the original 'Castlewellan Gold' Leylandii, Ginkgo biloba, and the handkerchief tree (Davidia involucrata). The garden also contains magnolias, rhododendrons, and conifers.

== Peace Maze ==
The peace maze located in the park was constructed between 2000 and 2001. It contains 6000 yew trees planted by volunteers from Northern Ireland. It was the longest permanent hedge maze in the world until July 2007, when the Pineapple Garden Maze in Wahiawa, Hawaii was extended.

== Castlewellan Castle ==
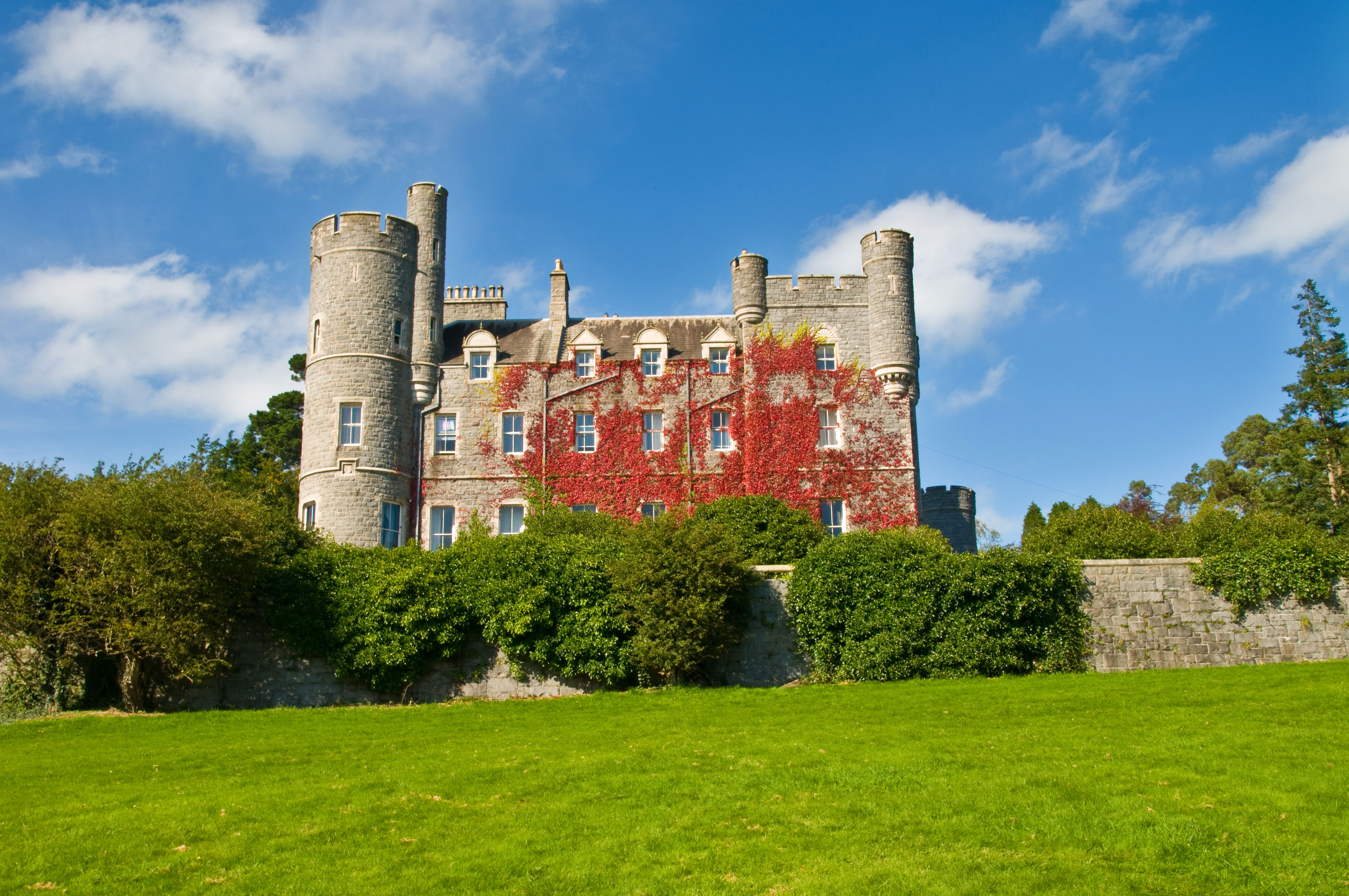
Castlewellan Castle

Castlewellan Castle is a Scottish baronial castle built by the Annesley family between 1856 and 1858. It stands close to the entrance of the arboretum overlooking Castlewellan Lake and was built on the site of an old church.

The castle was built by The 4th Earl Annesley, who commissioned the Scottish architect William Burn to design it. It was built of locally quarried granite by the Parker partnership of Liverpool.

On the death of the unmarried 4th Earl in 1874, the original estate, much larger than the present park, passed to his brother Hugh, 5th Earl Annesley, who considerably enhanced the arboretum. His son, Francis, 6th Earl Annesley, inherited in 1908 but was killed in the First World War in 1914, after which the earldom passed to his cousin Walter and the Castlewellan Estate to his sister, Lady Mabel Annesley. She left it to her son Gerald Francis Annesley (born Gerald Sowerby), who sold it to the government.

Since 1974, after standing empty for ten years, the castle has been used as a Christian conference centre.

== Flora ==
The Castlewellan Gold Leyland cypress was developed in the park from a mutant tree. It was selected by the park director, John Keown, and named Cupressus macrocarpa 'Keownii' in 1963. The original specimen is located in the ornamental gardens.

The national Arboretum of Northern Ireland is located in the park. It was first started in 1740 and contains trees from Asia, Australasia, and North and South America, including Athrotaxis, Japanese Maple and Giant sequoia planted in the 1850s. In May 2018 the arboretum was awarded a plaque by the International Dendrology Society for having a "dendrological collection of exceptional merit." The society encourages the conservation of rare and endangered plants and trees.

The Giant sequoia were planted as saplings in 1856. They were from a group of seed collected in California by renowned plant collector William Lobb and grown in a nursery from 1853. One of the trees has developed 19 separate trunks, a form rarely seen in cultivated specimens of this plant. The tree was voted Northern Ireland's Tree of the Year for 2018.

== Gallery ==
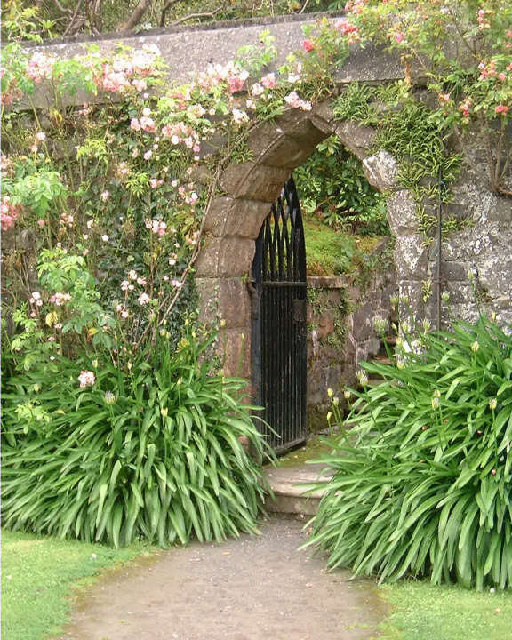
Gateway at Castlewellan Arboretum

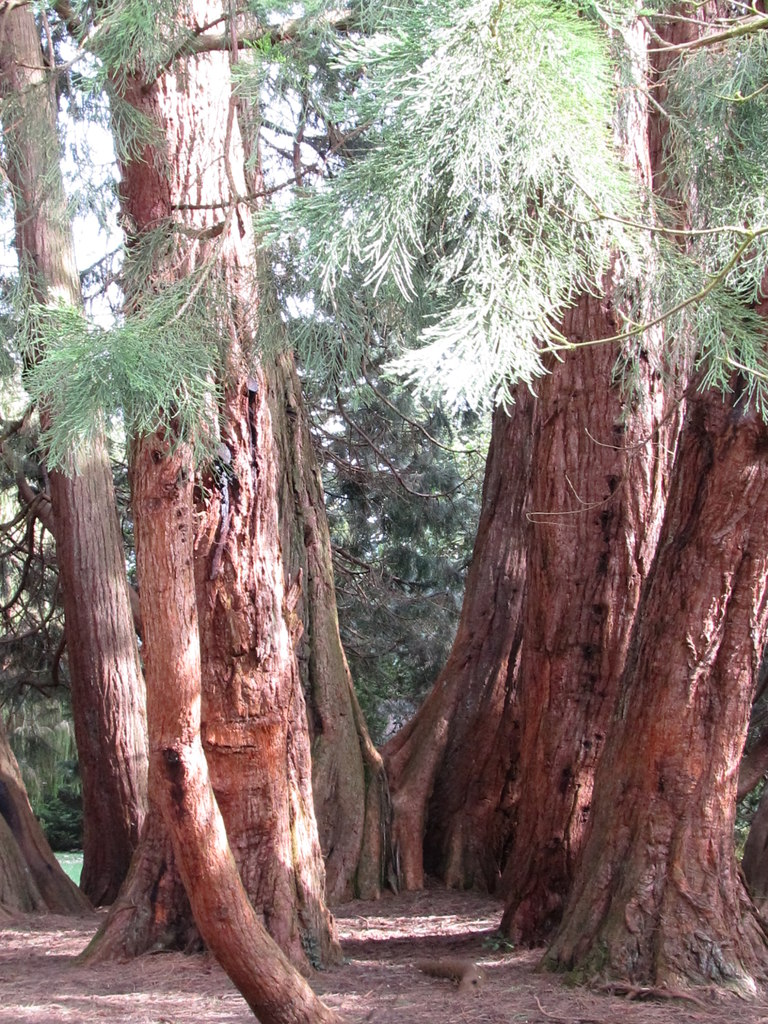
Giant sequoia

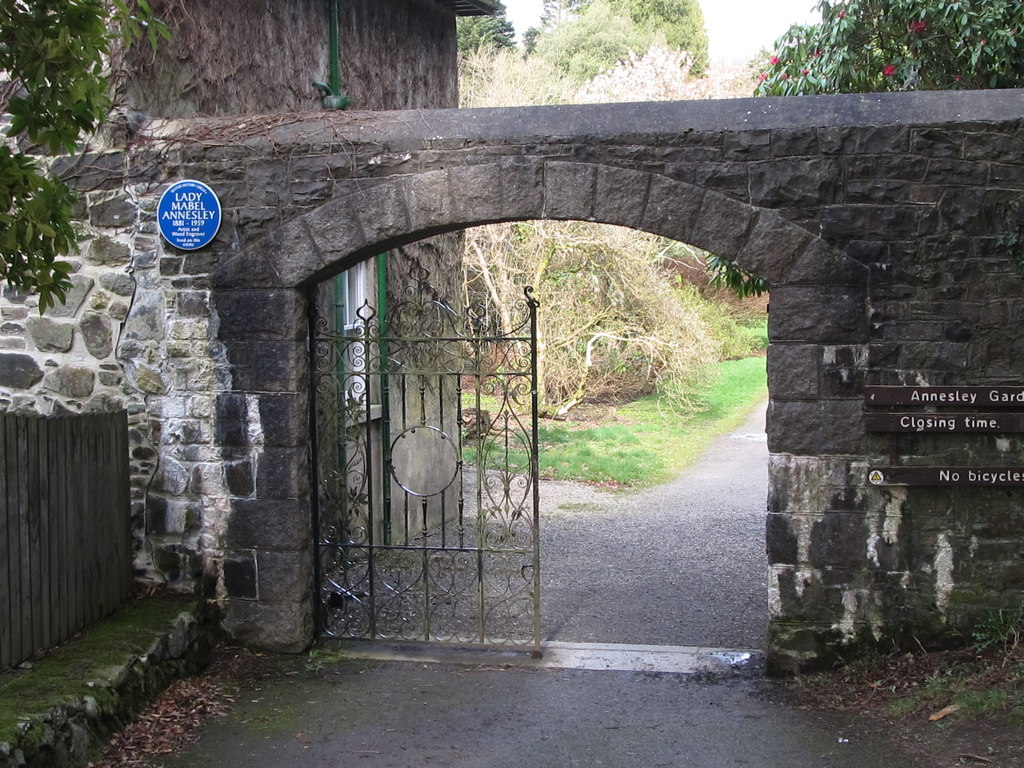
The entrance to the
Annesely Walled Garden

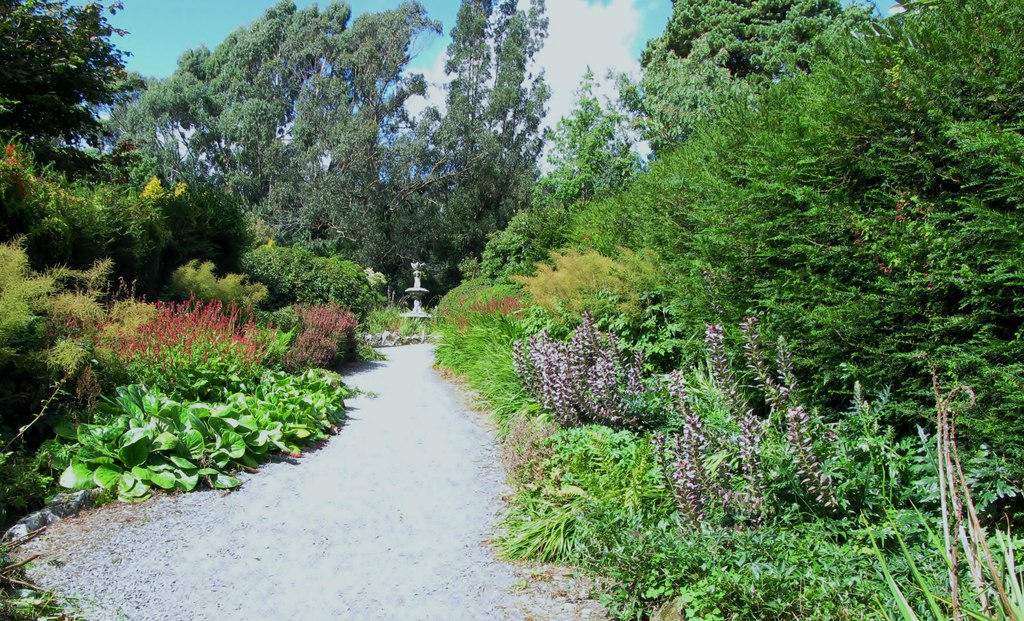
Annesley Garden

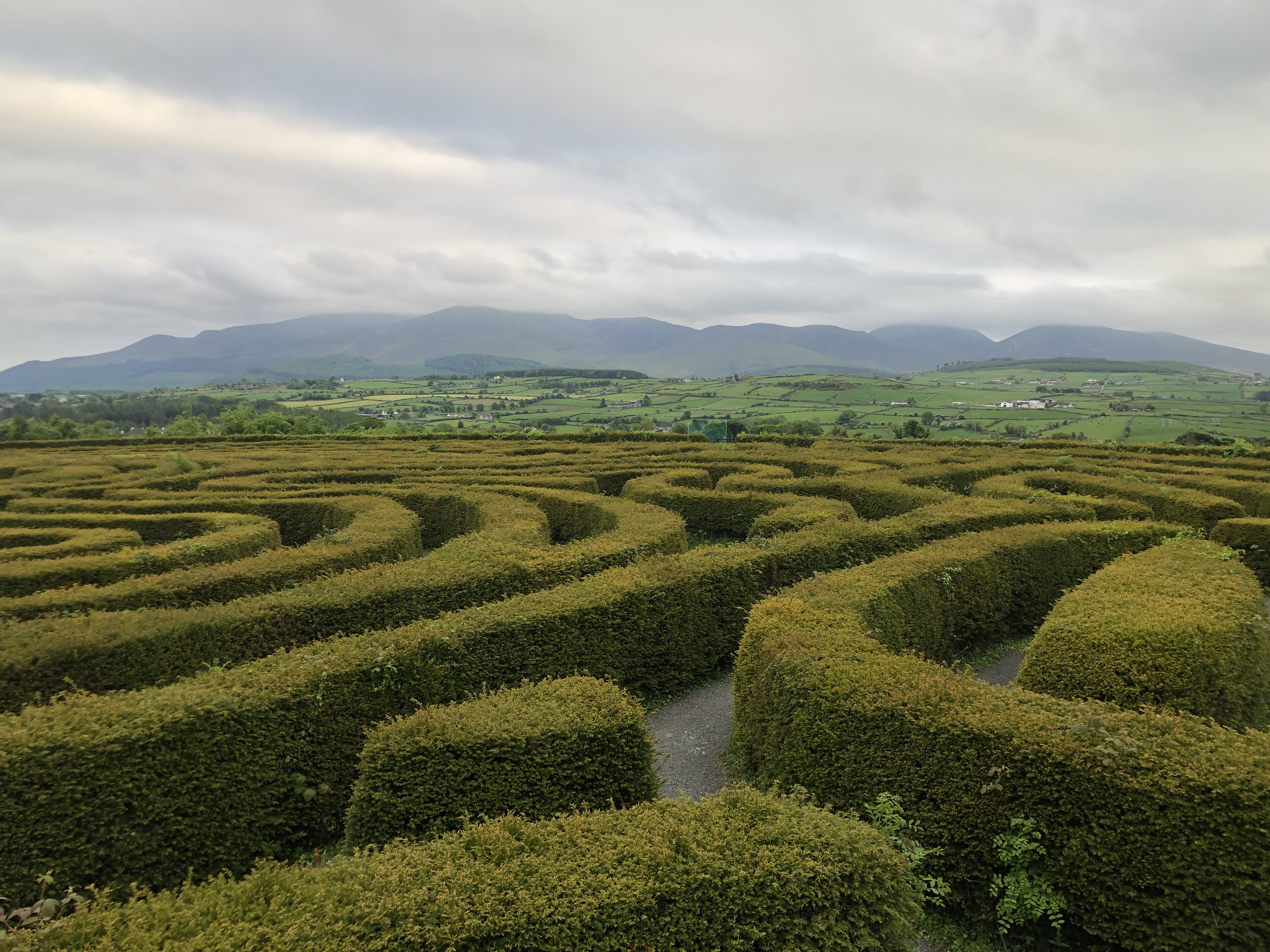
Peace maze

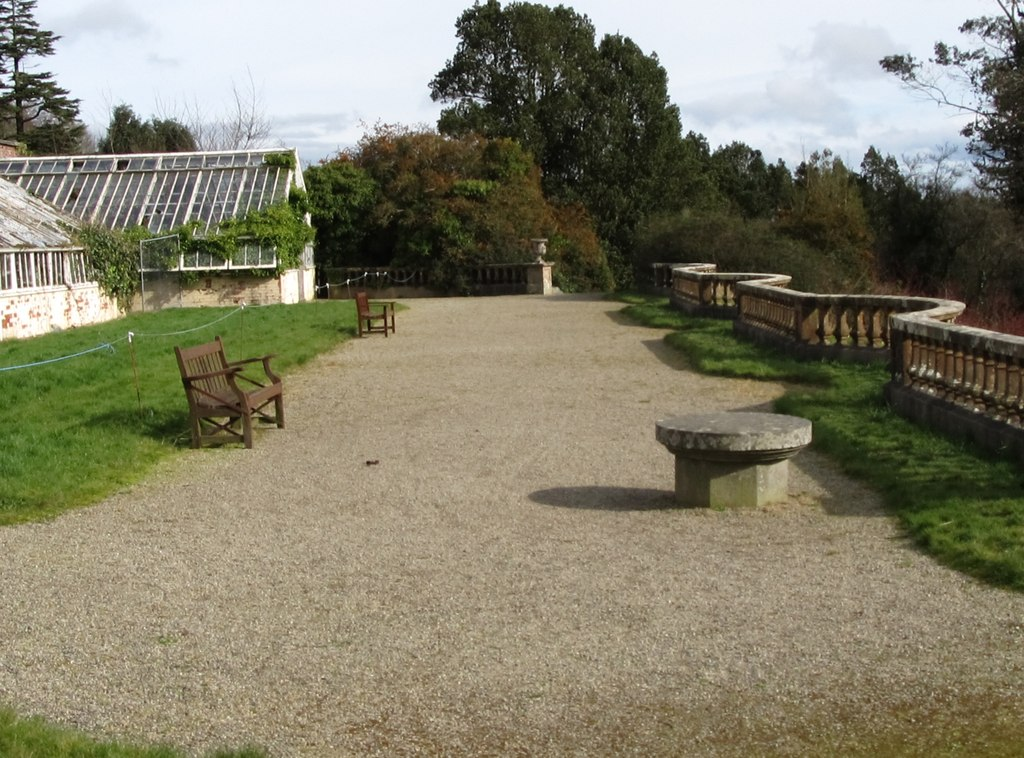
The greenhouse terrace

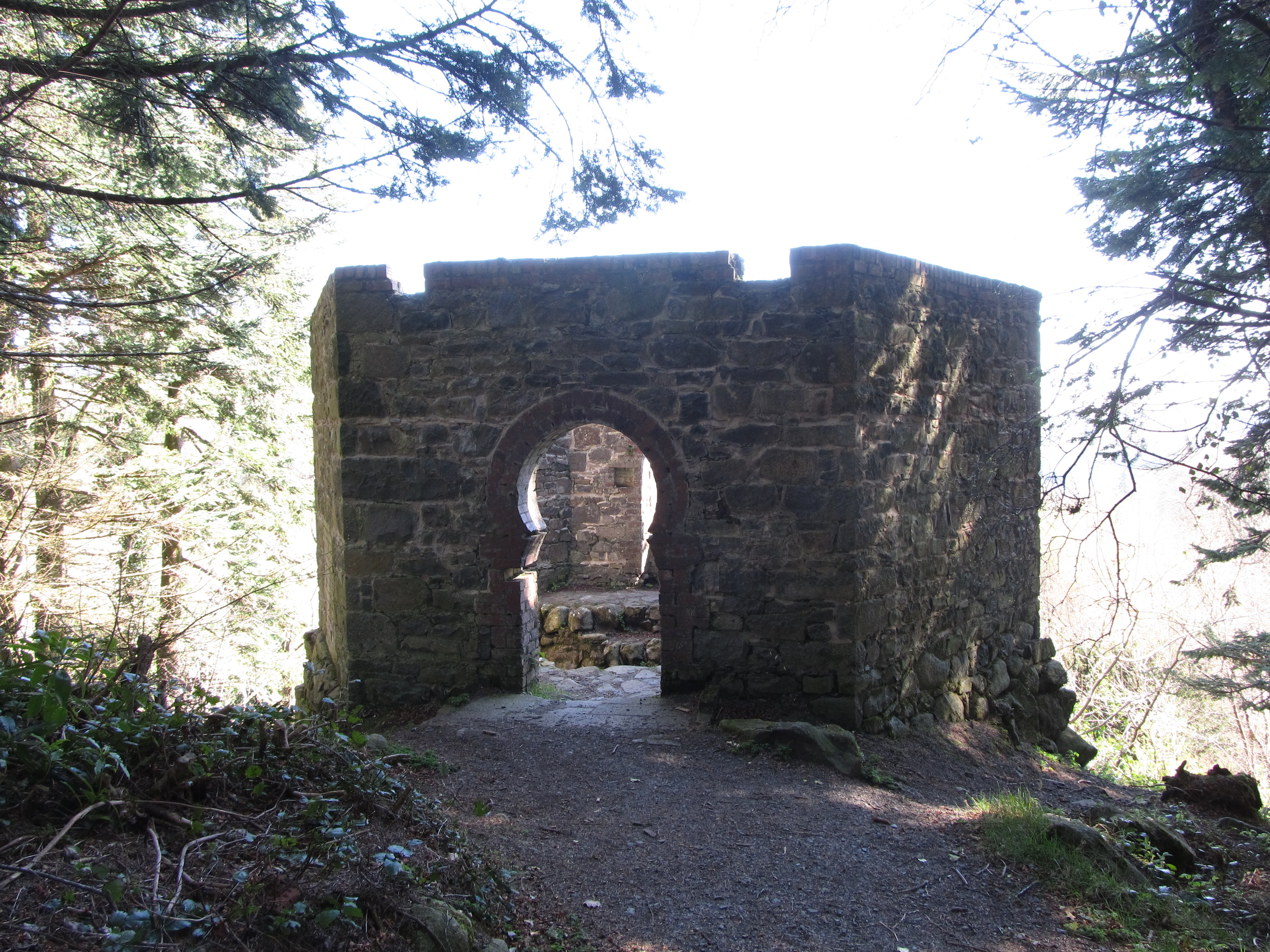
The ruined Moorish Tower Tea House

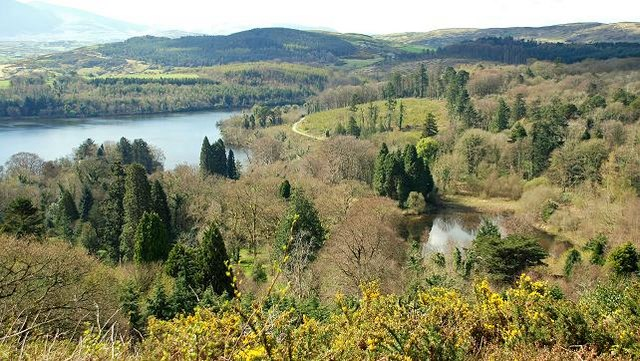
Lake and path
Castlewellan Forest Park

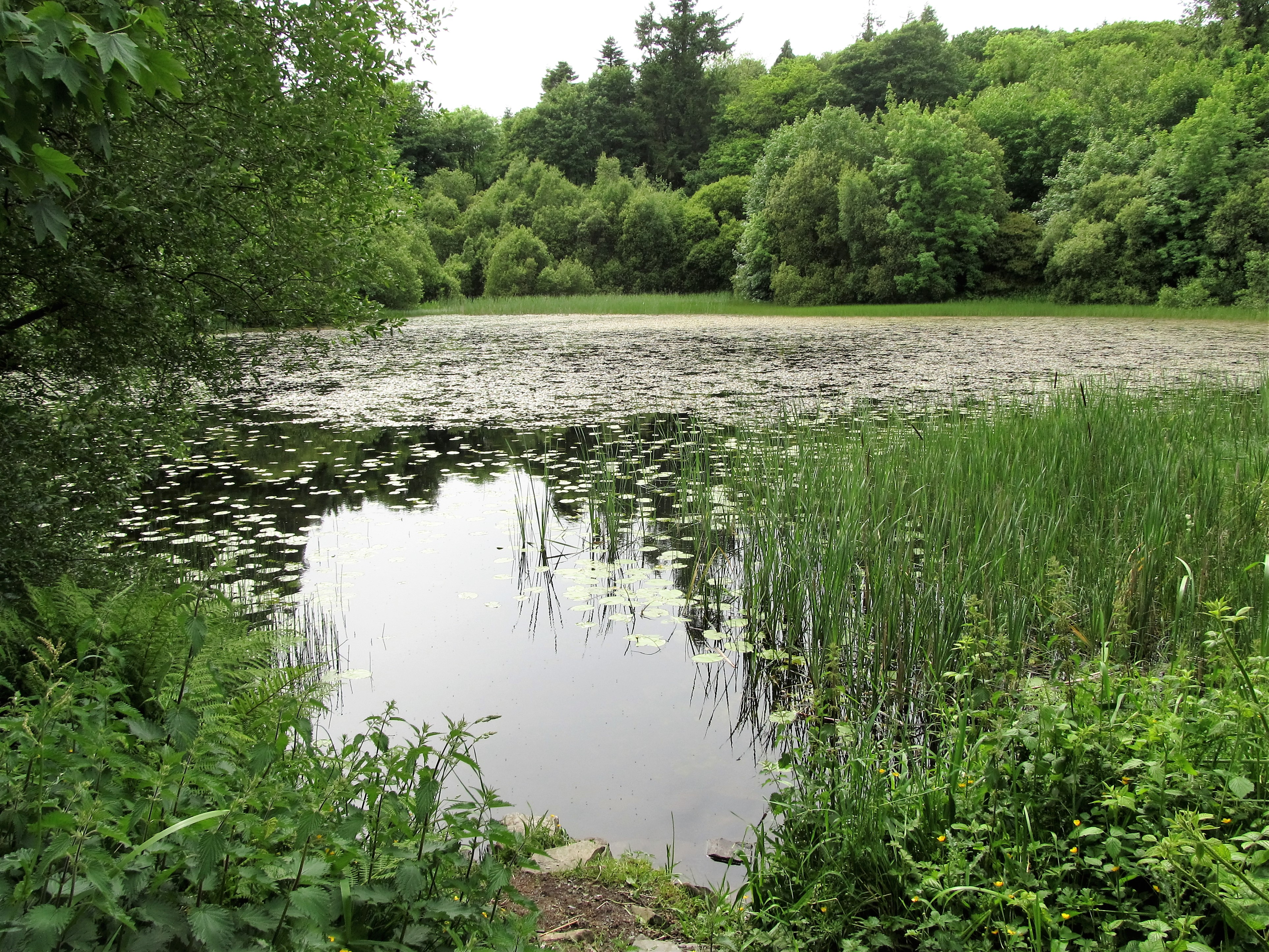
The Cypress Pond
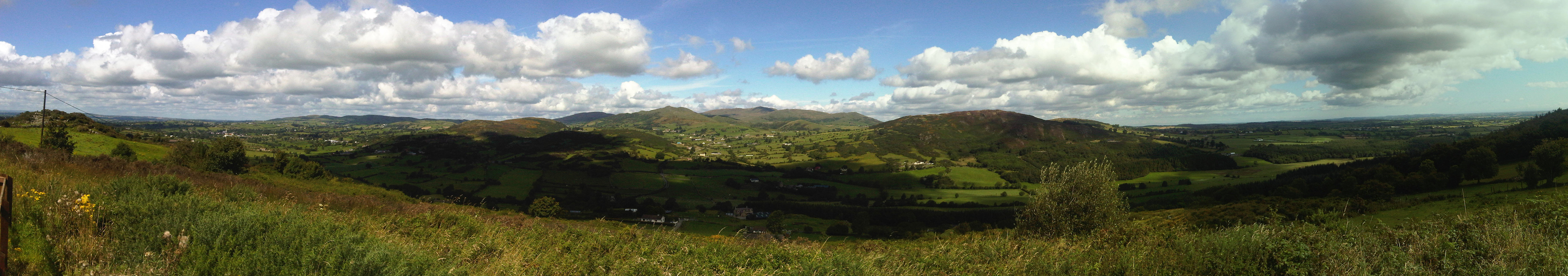
Panorama of Castlewellan Forest Park and the Mourne
