= Jessie Winter =

British stage actress (1886–1971)

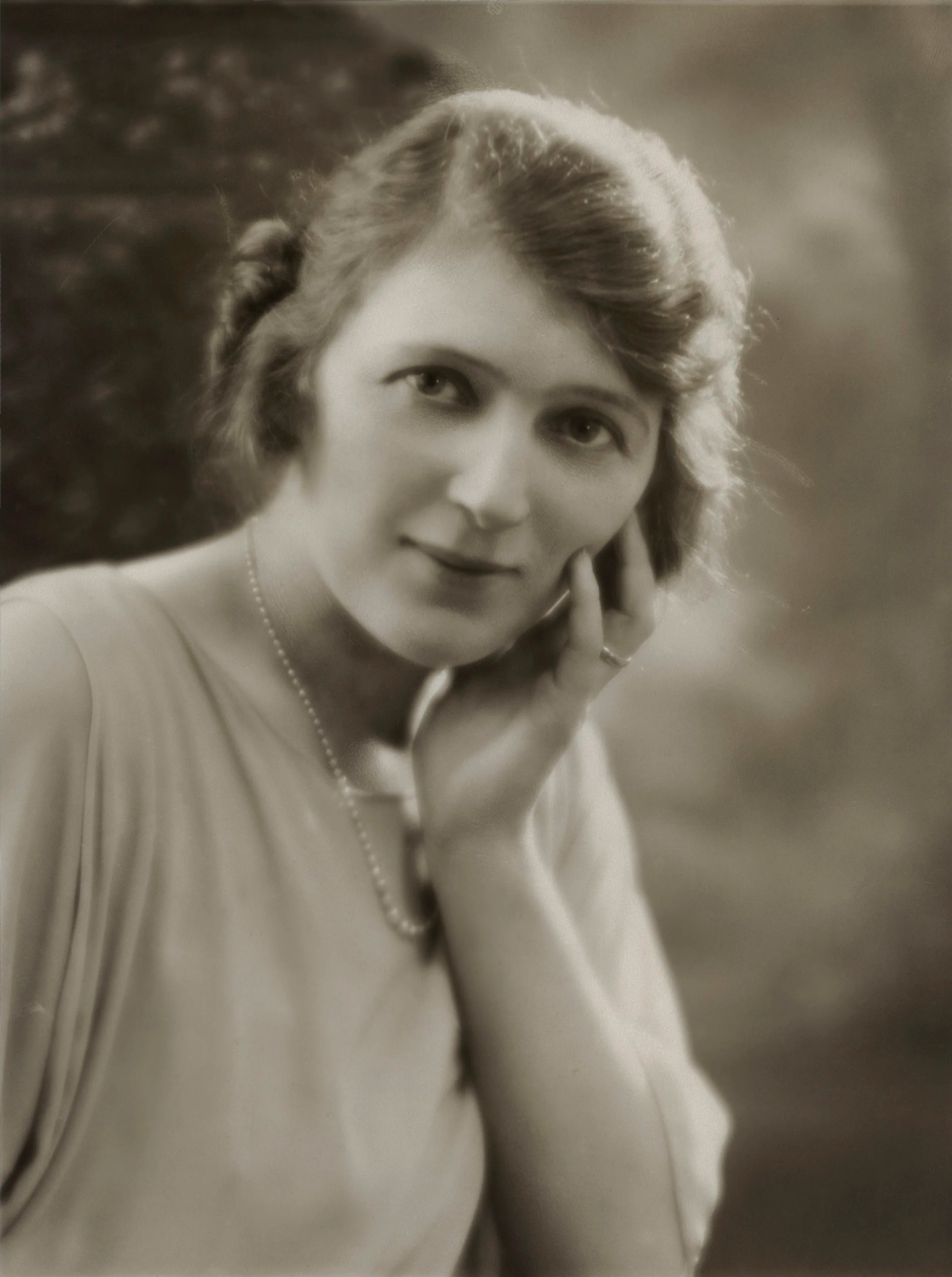
- Winter in 1922
- Born: 11 August 1886; Lambeth, London, United Kingdom
- Died: 8 August 1971 (aged 84); Denville Hall, Northwood, London, United Kingdom
- Occupation: Actress
- Years active: 1917–1938 (film)

Jessie Winter (1886–1971) was a British stage actress, known for her roles in the West End. She also appeared in six films between 1917 and 1938. She was married to Austin Melford.

== Filmography ==
- Mary Girl (1917)
- Goodbye (1918)
- The Twelve Pound Look (1920)
- The Diamond Necklace (1921)
- His Lordship (1936)
- Murder in the Family (1938)

== Selected stage roles ==
- The River (1925, by Patrick Hastings)

== Bibliography ==
- Fells, Robert M. George Arliss: The Man who Played God. Scarecrow Press, 2004.
- Goble, Alan. The Complete Index to Literary Sources in Film. Walter de Gruyter, 1999.
