= A Pearl Necklace =

1926 Chinese silent film

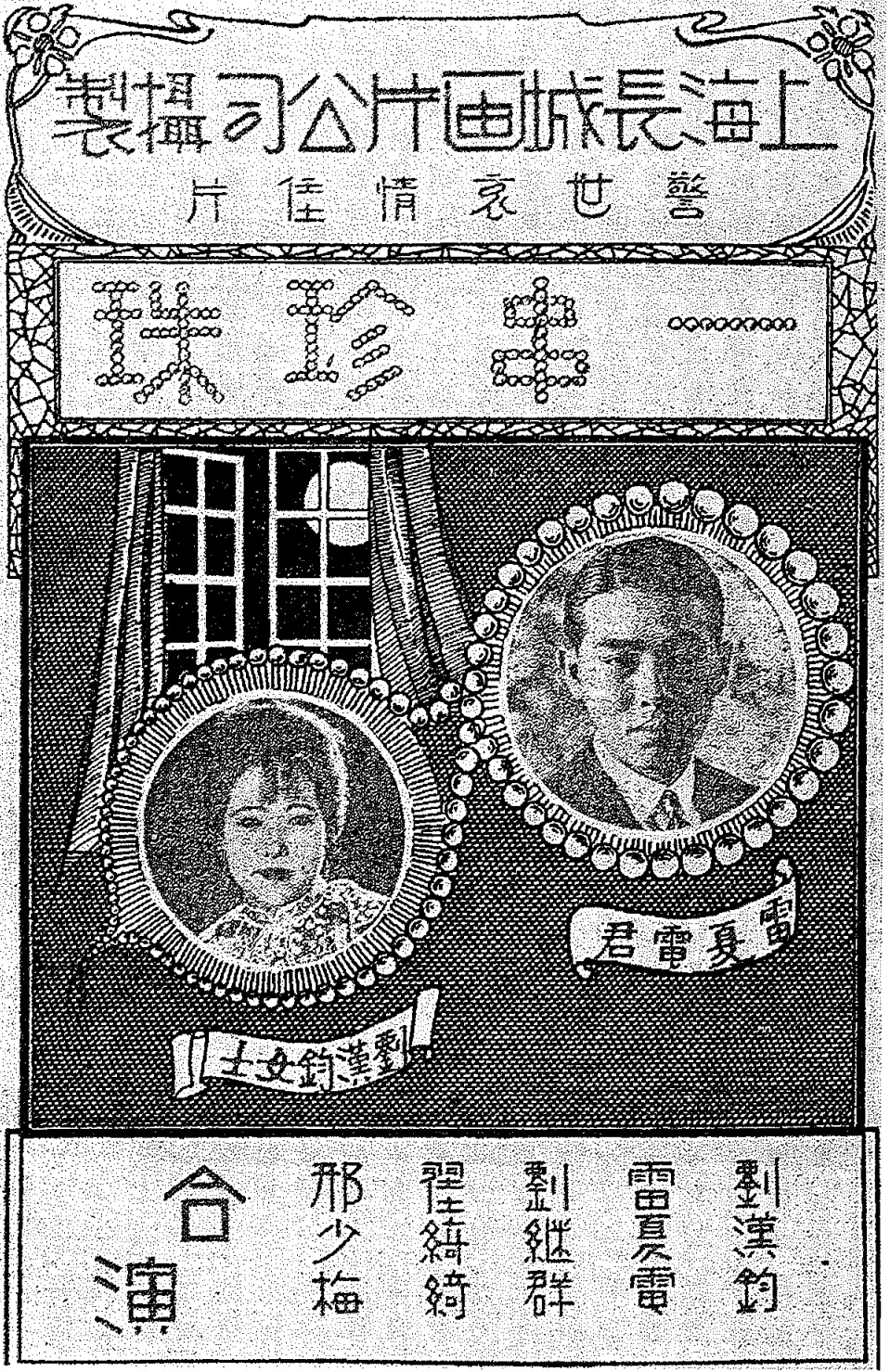
- An advertisement for the film
- Chinese: 一串珍珠
Transcriptions
Standard Mandarin
- Hanyu Pinyin: Yichuan zhenzhu
- Directed by: Li Zeyuan
- Screenplay by: Hou Yao
- Based on: "The Necklace" by Guy de Maupassant
- Production company: Great Wall Film Company
- Release date: 1926
- Running time: 102 minutes
- Country: Republic of China
- Language: Silent

A Pearl Necklace (Chinese: 一串珍珠; pinyin: Yichuan zhenzhu), also translated as A String of Pearls, is a Chinese silent film shot in 1925 and released in 1926. It is adapted from Guy de Maupassant’s short story "The Necklace". The screenplay was written by Hou Yao and directed by Li Zeyuan (referred to as Lee C. Y. in the film), produced by Great Wall Film Company.

== Synopsis ==
The full film

The movie begins with an introduction to a white collar Chinese family. They are living in a modern style house, and the husband, Yusheng, is sitting in his living room reading a newspaper. He is accompanied by his wife, Xiuzhen, and their infant son. Yusheng is an accountant and Xiuzhen does not work.

To celebrate a holiday with their friends, Yusheng and Xiuzhen borrowed a pearl necklace as an accessory, which drew great admiration from their friends. Xiuzhen lies to another guest at a party she is attending and states that her husband gave her the necklace. After hearing this, the guest has a thief to break into their home and steal the necklace. The next morning, Yusheng and Xiuzhen woke up to find the necklace had disappeared. With no other options, Yusheng embezzled company funds to buy an identical necklace to return. Unexpectedly, he was caught and imprisoned for embezzlement, and what had once been a happy little family was ruined by a moment of vanity.

One day after his release, Wang found a note at his doorstep that read: “Bring 1,000 yuan to Little Stone Bridge at 4 o’clock tomorrow, or your secret will be revealed.” Driven by curiosity, Wang went to the bridge at the appointed time and saw the husband of his wife’s friend arguing with a scoundrel and getting injured. It turns out that the man at the party was another accountant from the factory where Yusheng used to work. He was being blackmailed by the thief. To his shock, that man turned out to be the true culprit who had stolen the necklace.

After all is revealed, the man uses his connections to get Yusheng an accounting job and they live happily ever after.

== Cast ==
- Lei Xiadian (雷夏電)
- Liu Hanjun (劉漢鈞)
- Zhai Qiqi (翟綺綺)
- Xing Shaomei (邢少梅)
- Liu Jiqun (劉繼群)

== Ideology ==
Screenwriter Hou Yao said the film aims to criticize vanity and encourage people to repent. He believes that there are no absolute standards for thoughts, and they should be judged based on the needs of a specific era and whether they can bring benefits to society.The Palace Theatre introduction notes that the film is set in a prosperous but unequal Shanghai, where residents indulge in luxurious pleasures. In 1925, the May 30th Movement challenged the image of Shanghai as a modern affluent city. The film links modernization with modern couples and the rise of bourgeois women, while also warning women to be careful about the temptation brought by newfound freedom and luxury. The Great Wall Film Company, to convey this kind of vanity and warning, produced this film titled "A Pearl Necklace" and used this necklace as a symbol for the love issues between spouses.This concept runs through the entire film. The opening subtitles also reiterated this warning, linking the pearl necklace to vanity, sadness, and the husband's victimization.

== Sources ==
- Ye, Tan; Zhu, Yun (2012). Historical Dictionary of Chinese Cinema. Rowman & Littlefield. ISBN 978-0-8108-6779-6.
